= Adaptations of Sherlock Holmes =

Adaptations of stories by Arthur Conan Doyle

The stories of Sherlock Holmes by Sir Arthur Conan Doyle have been very popular as adaptations for the stage, and later film, and still later television. The four volumes of the Universal Sherlock Holmes (1995) compiled by Ronald B. De Waal lists over 25,000 Holmes-related productions and products. They include the original writings, "together with the translations of these tales into sixty-three languages, plus Braille and shorthand, the writings about the Writings or higher criticism, writings about Sherlockians and their societies, memorials and memorabilia, games, puzzles and quizzes, phonograph records, audio and video tapes, compact discs, laser discs, ballets, films, musicals, operettas, oratorios, plays, radio and television programs, parodies and pastiches, children's books, cartoons, comics, and a multitude of other items—from advertisements to wine—that have accumulated throughout the world on the two most famous characters in literature."

== Board games ==
The board game 221B Baker Street (Gibsons Games) was first developed in 1975, and the book-based game Sherlock Holmes: Consulting Detective (Sleuth Publications) was published in 1981. Multiple expansions have since been published for both games. The board game A Study in Emerald, released in 2013, was based on the Sherlock Holmes pastiche "A Study in Emerald" by Neil Gaiman. Other Sherlock Holmes board games include Watson & Holmes (Ludonova, 2015), Beyond Baker Street (Z-Man Games, 2016), Sherlock Holmes and Moriarty's Web (2016), and Exit: The Game – The Disappearance of Sherlock Holmes (Thames & Kosmos, 2022) Card games based on Sherlock Holmes include I Say, Holmes! (2007, updated 2014), Holmes: Sherlock & Mycroft (Devir Games, 2015), and Clash of Minds: Holmes vs Moriarty (2019).

== Comics ==
=== Comic strips ===
Three Sherlock Holmes adaptations have appeared in American newspapers. The first, titled Sherlock Holmes, ran from 1930 to 1931. Sherlock Holmes was drawn by Leo O'Mealia (who later drew covers for Action Comics) and distributed by the Bell Syndicate. A short-lived half-page Sherlock Holmes comic strip appeared daily and Sunday in the 1950s, written by radio scriptwriter Edith Meiser and drawn by Frank Giacoia. The third adaptation "Mr. Holmes of Baker Street" by Bill Barry appeared in 1976–1977. This adaptation of the famous detective was not very popular in the south, but experienced a series of faithful followers in northern states.

=== Comic books ===
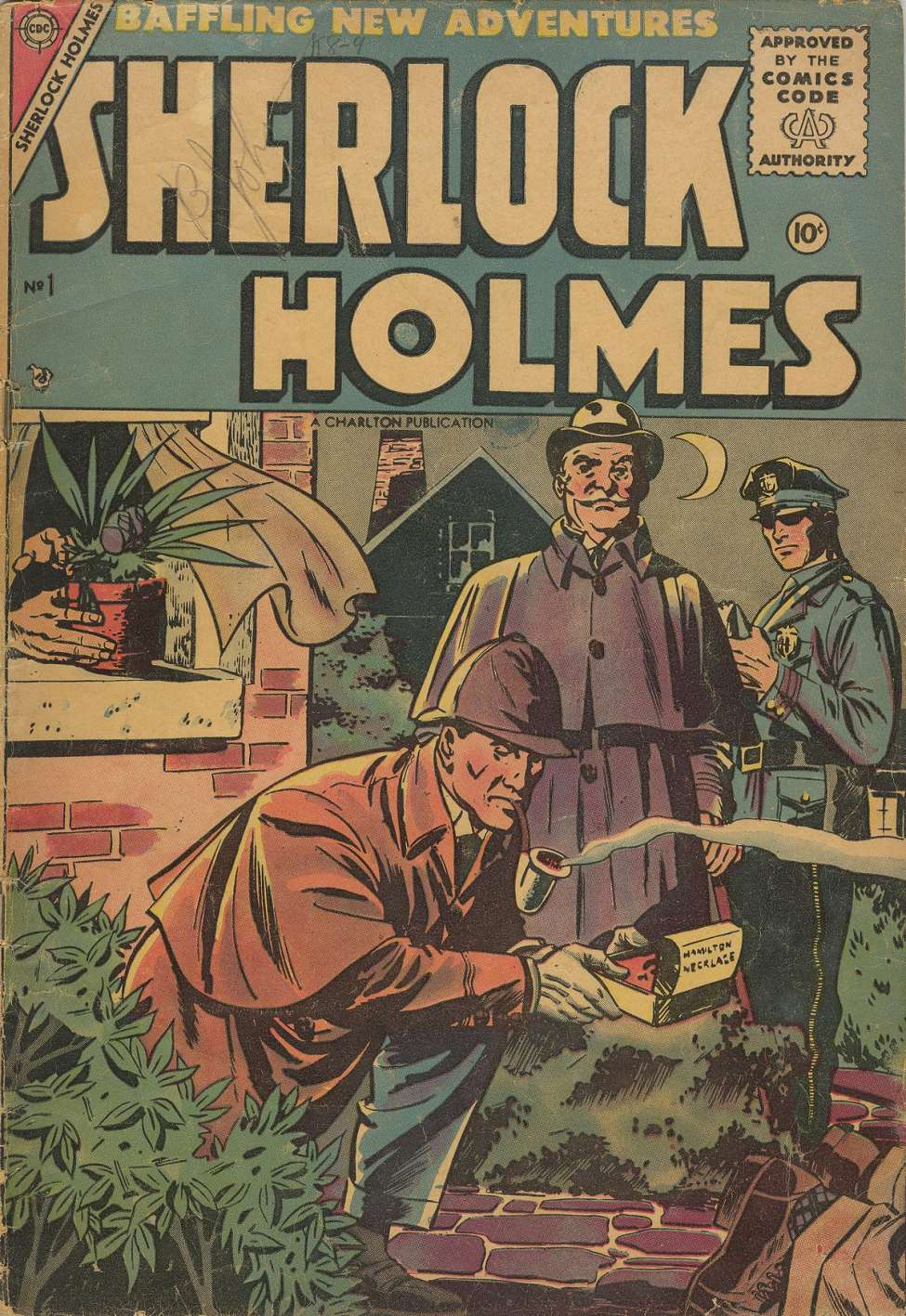
Front cover of issue #1 of Sherlock Holmes published by Charlton Comics in October 1955

Despite the character's near-ubiquitous presence in other media and household recognition, in comic books Sherlock Holmes has been limited to the occasional miniseries or guest appearance. Sherlock Holmes cover artist Walt Simonson has speculated that this may be because the period setting is so difficult to draw.

SelfMadeHero published "Hound of the Baskervilles", adapted by Ian Edginton and illustrated by Ian Culbard, in May 2009.

In The League of Extraordinary Gentlemen, Holmes appears in a flashback sequence depicting the climactic scene of "The Final Problem" and is still believed by the public to be deceased, although it is revealed in the second volume that Mina later meets with him.

In the 1990s, Caliber Comics issued a four-part Sherlock Holmes Reader which features quotes from Holmes, a map of 221-B Baker Street, and canon story adaptations as well as individual stories such as Dr. Jekyll and Mr. Holmes and The Sussex Vampire.

2009 brought the Black House Comics series The Dark Detective: Sherlock Holmes. The series is written by Christopher Sequeira with covers by Academy Award winning artist Dave Elsey.

In 2010, Boom! Studios published a four-part series entitled Muppet Sherlock Holmes which featured Gonzo as Holmes, Fozzie Bear as Dr. Watson, and Kermit the Frog as Inspector Lestrade.

In 2013, New Paradigm Studios began publishing a monthly, ongoing series entitled Watson and Holmes. The series re-imagines Sherlock Holmes and Dr. Watson as living in the 21st century and living in Harlem.

The BBC series Sherlock (see: Television series in this article) has a manga adaptation published in Japan by Kadokawa Shoten. The English translation of this series is being released by Titan Comics in the UK and US.

There is also a loosely adapted manga adaptation titled Moriarty the Patriot that follows William Moriarty as the hero and protagonist.

In 2024, IDW Publishing announced Godzilla's Monsterpiece Theater, a three-part miniseries where Sherlock Homes will team up with Great Gatsby, Dracula and the Time Traveller from H.G. Wells' The Time Machine to battle the Godzilla.

==== DC Comics ====
DC Comics' Sherlock Holmes one-shot (cover-dated September–October 1975) adapts "The Final Problem" and "The Adventure of the Empty House". The one-shot's creative team of Dennis O'Neil (writer) and E. R. Cruz (artist) had coincidentally just come off of adapting another pulp crimefighter for DC, The Shadow.

O'Neil and Cruz would each shortly take an additional turn at the character: The Joker #6, written by O'Neil, pitted Holmes (actually an actor suffering a head injury) against the title character, and the 50th anniversary issue of Detective Comics, drawn by Cruz, additionally commemorated the 100th anniversary of Sherlock Holmes, featuring an elderly Holmes meet Batman.

==== Marvel Comics ====
In the Marvel Universe, the immortal shapeshifter Mystique is depicted as having lived in a male guise as a "consulting detective" who first established her romantic relationship with her later wife Destiny (Irene Adler) in the 1800s. Biographical details implied Mystique to have been Sherlock Holmes, an implication confirmed in the text by 2022. Mystique, in her male guise of Holmes, conceived Nightcrawler with Destiny, who bore him.

The character of Clive Reston in the Marvel Comics universe is a relative of Sherlock Holmes mentioned the former hero to be his great uncle.

Separately, a different version of Holmes from the "Ideaverse" appears as the main protagonist of Deadpool Killustrated.

== Books ==
=== Novels/Novellas ===
There are many novels, novellas, and short stories featuring Sherlock Holmes that were written by authors other than Arthur Conan Doyle.

== Film ==
Sherlock Holmes Baffled, the first screen portrayal of Holmes in 1900.

It has been estimated that Sherlock Holmes is the most prolific screen character in the history of cinema. The first known film featuring Holmes is Sherlock Holmes Baffled, a one-reel film running less than a minute, made by the American Mutoscope and Biograph Company in 1900. This was followed by a 1905 Vitagraph film Adventures of Sherlock Holmes; or, Held for Ransom, with H. Kyrle Bellew and J. Barney Sherry in unlisted roles. It was long believed that the film starred Maurice Costello as Sherlock Holmes, but Leslie S. Klinger has written that the identification of Costello in the role is flawed. Klinger states that the first identification of Costello with the role was in Michael Pointer's Public Life of Sherlock Holmes published in 1975 but that Pointer later realized his error and wrote to Klinger stating

I am now aware that Maurice Costello could not have been in that film, as he had not joined the Vitagraph company by that date. I'm sorry that my book has been misleading, but I doubt that I shall have the opportunity for an amended reprint, and should not have the time to prepare one anyway.

Many similar films were made in the early years of the twentieth century, most notably the 13 one- and two-reel silent films produced by the Danish Nordisk Film Company between 1908 and 1911. The only non-lost film is Sherlock Holmes i Bondefangerkløer, produced in 1910. Holmes was originally played by Viggo Larsen. Other actors who played Holmes in those films were Otto Lagoni, Einar Zangenberg, Lauritz Olsen, and Alwin Neuss. In 1911 the American Biograph company produced a series of 11 short comedies based on the Holmes character with Mack Sennett (later of Keystone Cops fame) in the title role.

In 1914, Universal released A Study in Scarlet, starring Francis Ford as Holmes with a script by Grace Cunard. It is believed that Ford's younger brother, John Ford, credited as "Jack Ford", portrayed Dr. Watson.

By 1916, Harry Arthur Saintsbury, who had played Holmes on stage hundreds of times in Gillette's play, reprised the role in the 1916 film The Valley of Fear.

The next significant cycle of Holmes films were produced by the Stoll Pictures company in Britain. Between 1921 and 1923 they produced a total of 47 two-reelers, all featuring noted West End actor Eille Norwood in the lead with Hubert Willis as Watson.

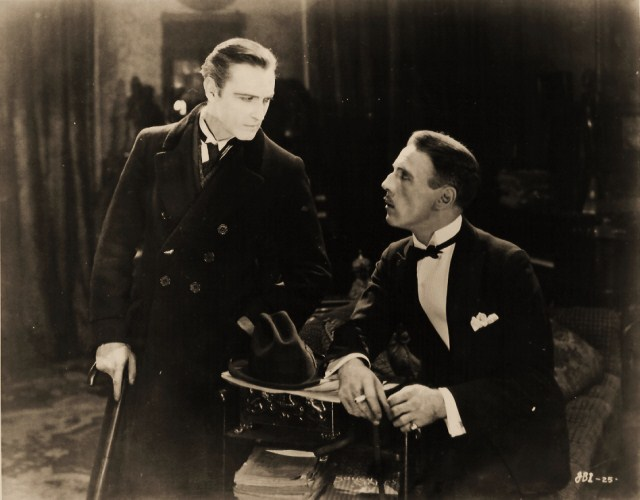
John Barrymore and Roland Young as Holmes and Watson in Sherlock Holmes (1922)

John Barrymore played the role in a 1922 movie entitled Sherlock Holmes, with Roland Young as Watson and William Powell in his first screen appearance. This Goldwyn film is the first Holmes movie made with high production values and a major star.

Clive Brook played Sherlock Holmes three times: The Return of Sherlock Holmes (1929), as part of the anthology film Paramount on Parade (1930), and Sherlock Holmes (1932). Reginald Owen, who played Dr. Watson in the latter film, would portray Holmes the following year in A Study in Scarlet.

In 1931, Raymond Massey played Sherlock Holmes in his screen debut, The Speckled Band, while Arthur Wontner played Holmes in five British films from 1931 to 1937.

Sherlock Holmes and the Secret Weapon (1943), starring Basil Rathbone and Nigel Bruce

Basil Rathbone and Nigel Bruce played Holmes and Watson in The Hound of the Baskervilles, which launched a 14-film series. Rathbone is regarded as the Holmes of his generation.

Peter Cushing played Sherlock Holmes in the 1959 film The Hound of the Baskervilles as part of Hammer Horror. This was the first depiction of Holmes in colour. He later portrayed Holmes alongside Nigel Stock as Dr Watson in a 16 part BBC television series in 1968.

A Study in Terror is a 1965 British thriller film directed by James Hill and starring John Neville as Sherlock Holmes and Donald Houston as Dr. Watson. It is the first film in which the sleuth investigates the Jack the Ripper murders.

In the 1970 film The Private Life of Sherlock Holmes, Holmes is portrayed by Robert Stephens, Dr. John H. Watson by Colin Blakely and Mycroft Holmes by Christopher Lee. Lee had previously played Sherlock in the 1962 film, Sherlock Holmes and the Deadly Necklace.

The 1971 film They Might Be Giants explores the premise of a deranged man who believes himself to be Sherlock Holmes, with a psychiatrist becoming his Watson.

In 1975, Gene Wilder made his directorial debut with the comedy The Adventure of Sherlock Holmes' Smarter Brother, which he also wrote and starred in. Wilder played the bumbling jealous younger brother of Holmes (played by Douglas Wilmer) trying to solve a case in which a young dance hall girl (Madeline Kahn) is being blackmailed. The cast also included Marty Feldman and Dom DeLuise.

In 1976, The Seven-Per-Cent Solution was released, adapted from the novel of the same name which was written as a pastiche by the American writer Nicholas Meyer. The film sees Sherlock Holmes being treated for a cocaine addiction with the help of Sigmund Freud.

In the 1979 film Murder by Decree, Holmes is embroiled in the investigation surrounding the real-life 1888 Whitechapel murders committed by Jack the Ripper. Christopher Plummer plays Holmes and James Mason plays Watson.

Young Sherlock Holmes, a film about Sherlock Holmes's early adventures as a teenager, was produced by Amblin Entertainment and released by Paramount Pictures in 1985.

In 1986, Walt Disney Animation Studios released The Great Mouse Detective, an animated animal film based on the tradition of Sherlock Holmes.

In 1988, Michael Caine starred as Sherlock Holmes, with Ben Kingsley as Doctor Watson, in Without a Clue.

Robert Downey Jr. and Jude Law portray Sherlock Holmes and Dr. John Watson, respectively, in the film Sherlock Holmes, directed by Guy Ritchie and released in 2009, and its sequel, Sherlock Holmes: A Game of Shadows, released in 2011.

In 2015, Ian McKellen played a 93-year-old Sherlock Holmes in the film Mr. Holmes.

A parody of the Sherlock Holmes franchise, titled Holmes & Watson, was released in late 2018, featuring Will Ferrell and John C. Reilly in the titular roles respectively. The film was a critical and commercial failure, having been cited by critics as one of the worst comedy films of all time.

There is a 2019 animated Hong Kong film Sherlock Holmes and the Great Escape. The characters are depicted here as anthropomorphic animals.

Henry Cavill portrays Sherlock Holmes in all 3 films in the Enola Holmes series. The films follow the adventures of Enola Holmes (Millie Bobby Brown), who is portrayed as the younger sister of Sherlock and Mycroft Holmes (Sam Claflin).

In 2025, Les Best portrayed Sherlock Holmes in Sherlock Holmes: Mare of the Night.

== Internet ==
In January 2004, the BBC posted five new Sherlock Holmes short stories on their "Cult" website, along with RealAudio files of the stories, as read by Andrew Sachs and Hannah Gordon. The audio productions were done in association with BBC 7, but are no longer available. The texts of all five short stories are still posted, with accompanying illustrations and illustration galleries, as well as an edited transcript of an interview with Bert Coules. The short story texts can also be downloaded as eBooks in three different formats.

In October 2023, Sherlock & Co., a UK weekly audio drama podcast featuring Dr. John Watson as a modern-day podcaster, recounting classic Sherlock Holmes mysteries with a contemporary twist was released. Created by Joel Emery, the podcast features Paul Waggott as Watson and Harry Attwell as Holmes, focusing on canonical stories and produced by Holy Smokes Audio.

In December 2024, a weekly Noiser podcast began called "Sherlock Holmes Short Stories", starting with an adaptation of "The Adventure of the Speckled Band". Dr. Watson's role as narrator is played by Hugh Bonneville.

== Music ==
Composer Jon Deak wrote a work for solo double bass based on The Hound of the Baskervilles, complete with narration and sound effects to mimic radio plays of the 1920s.

Progressive rock musicians Clive Nolan and Oliver Wakeman released a concept album titled The Hound Of The Baskervilles about the story of the same name in 2002.

"Scarlet Story", the opening theme of the NHK puppetry Sherlock Holmes is titled after "A Study in Scarlet". And a song titled "Agra Treasure" that is made for the show is sung in "The Adventure of the Cheerful Four", one of the episodes of the series based on "The Sign of the Four". In the episode, some of the characters are modeled after the members of the Beatles.

== Radio ==
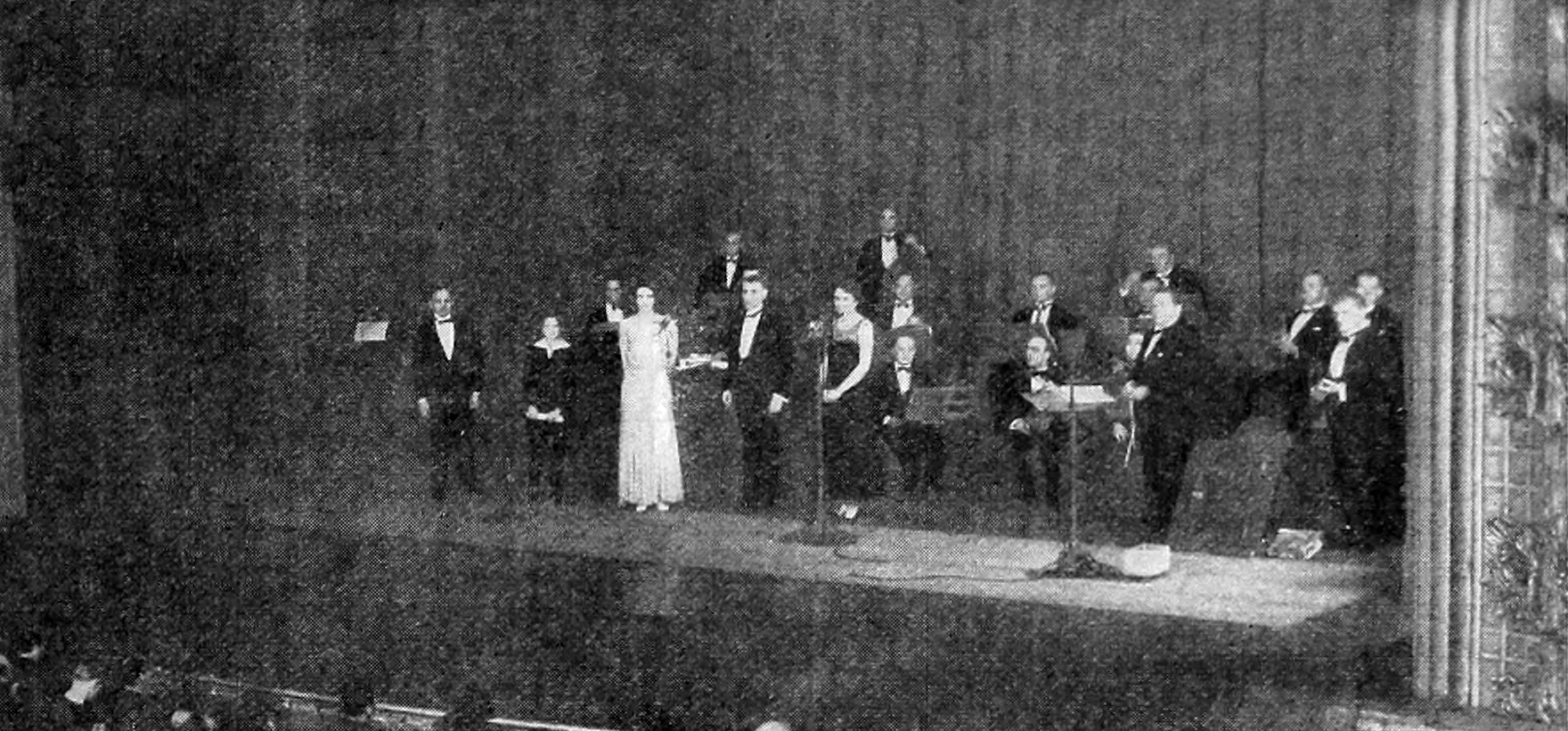
Photograph of the debut broadcast of the radio series The Adventures of Sherlock Holmes, at NBC's Times Square studio on October 20, 1930. The episode, "The Adventure of the Speckled Band", starred special guest William Gillette as Sherlock Holmes.

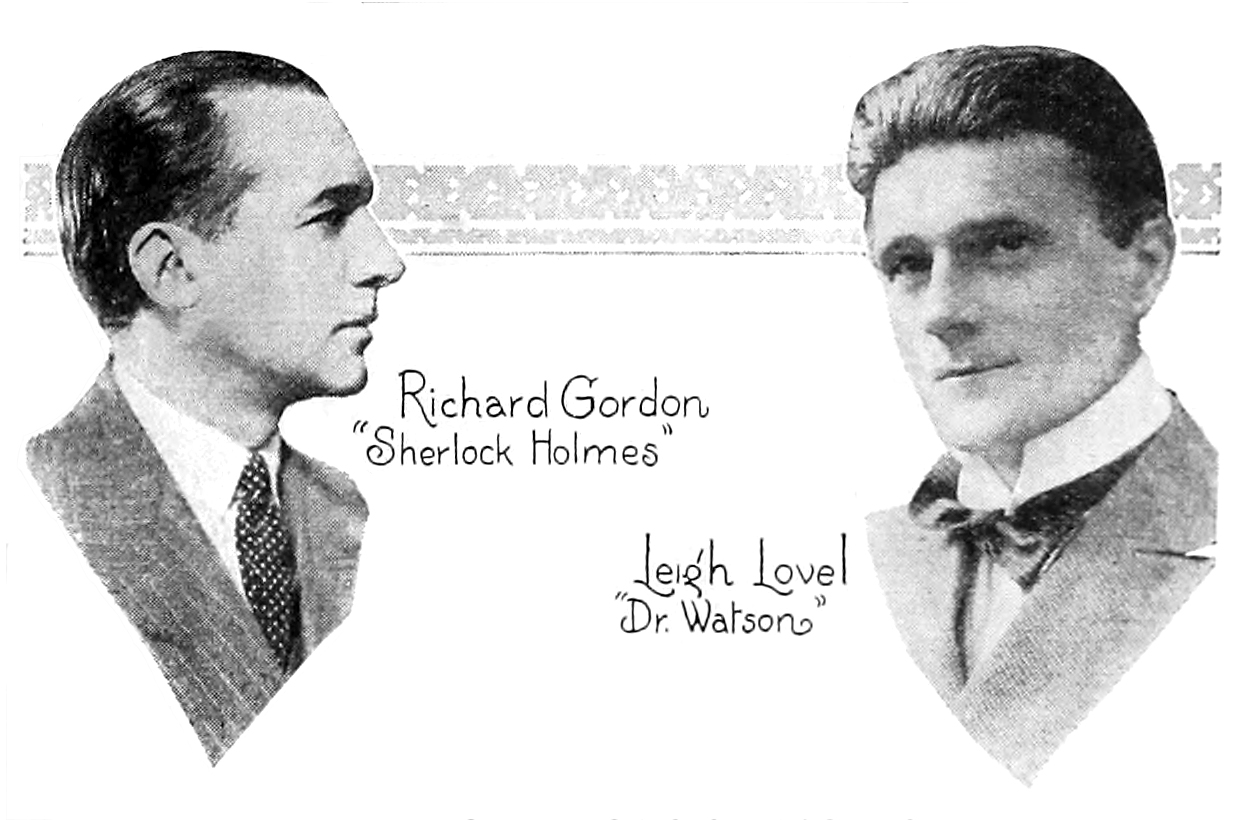
Richard Gordon and Leigh Lovel portrayed Holmes and Watson on the NBC radio series The Adventures of Sherlock Holmes

In the 1930s, writer, actress, and producer Edith Meiser was largely responsible for first bringing Holmes to American radio listeners. Meiser loved the Holmes stories, helped sell the show to the NBC radio network and found a sponsor. She wrote for the 1930–1936 radio series The Adventures of Sherlock Holmes, both adapting Doyle's classic tales and writing new adventures in the Holmesian style. The first show she adapted was "The Adventure of the Speckled Band." It was broadcast on October 20, 1930, and featured William Gillette in the lead role. For most of the series, Richard Gordon played Holmes and Leigh Lovel played Watson.

One famous radio appearance starred Orson Welles as Sherlock Holmes in an adaptation of one of William Gillette's plays. This was broadcast in September 1938 as part of The Mercury Theater on the Air series on CBS Radio.

Meiser also wrote for the radio series The New Adventures of Sherlock Holmes. Basil Rathbone and Nigel Bruce were cast after appearing in the 1939 film The Hound of the Baskervilles. NBC's Red and Blue networks carried the series until 1942. After that the shows were then written by the team of Dennis Green and Anthony Boucher. Then the Mutual Broadcasting System picked up the series, which it ran until 1947. Rathbone left in 1946 and was replaced by Tom Conway; Nigel Bruce remained for another season, with the proviso that Meiser continue to contribute “new adventures”. Meiser's adaptations and original stories won praise from Conan Doyle's family for their faithful adherence to the original characterization. After a change of networks, there were two more pairings: John Stanley as Holmes and Alfred Shirley as Watson in 1947–48 and Stanley and "George Spelvin" (a pseudonym used by Wendell Holmes so he wouldn't be confused with the Sherlock Holmes character) in these roles in 1948–49. Both Stanley and Conway emulated Rathbone when performing Holmes to aid in continuity for the audience.

John Gielgud played Holmes for BBC radio in the 1950s, with Ralph Richardson as Watson. Gielgud's brother, Val Gielgud, appeared in "The Bruce-Partington Plans", perhaps inevitably as Mycroft Holmes. As this series was co-produced by the American Broadcasting Company, known American actors also appeared, such as Orson Welles as Professor Moriarty in "The Adventure of the Final Problem".

Carleton Hobbs portrayed Holmes in BBC broadcasts in a 1952–1969 radio series, with Norman Shelley playing Watson. Many of these were broadcast on Children's Hour. Of the many actors who have portrayed Holmes and Watson for the BBC, the Hobbs and Shelley duo is the longest running.

There have been many other radio adaptations (over 750 in English), including a more recent BBC Radio 4 run featuring Clive Merrison as Holmes and Michael Williams as Watson. Together, the two actors completed adaptations of every story in the canon in a 1989–1998 radio series. The Further Adventures of Sherlock Holmes, a new series consisting of original stories written exclusively by Bert Coules, was then commissioned, but following Williams's death from cancer in 2001, he was replaced by Andrew Sachs. The episodes of The Further Adventures were based on throwaway references in Doyle's short stories and novels. The complete canonical run is available on CD and audio tape. The Further Adventures of Sherlock Holmes is also available on CD as four box sets, each containing four episodes.

BBC Radio 5 broadcast six new stories by John Taylor as The Unopened Casebook of Sherlock Holmes in 1993 with Simon Callow as Holmes and Nicky Henson as Watson. Taylor also wrote four stories as The Rediscovered Railway Mysteries, which was broadcast on BBC radio and narrated by Benedict Cumberbatch.

BBC Radio 2 also broadcast in 1999 a more ribald six-episode spoof series featuring Holmes and Watson entitled The Newly Discovered Casebook of Sherlock Holmes starring Roy Hudd as Holmes ("England's greatest detective, master of disguise and toffee-nosed ponce"), Chris Emmett as Watson ("contributor to the British Medical Journal, Which Stethescope Magazine and inventor of the self-raising thermometer") and June Whitfield as Mrs. Hudson. Titles in this series included "The Case of the Clockwork Fiend", "The Mystery of the Obese Escapologist", "The Case of the Deranged Botanist", "Sherlock Holmes and the Glorious Doppelganger", "Holmes Strikes a Happy Medium" and "The Demon Cobbler of Greek Street"; they usually turned out to have Holmes's mortal enemy Moriarty (Geoffrey Whitehead) behind each mystery. This series has since been rebroadcast on BBC Radio 7.

Starting in 1998, U.S. radio producer Jim French was given permission from the Conan Doyle estate to produce new, original Sherlock Holmes stories for radio in North America. These are presented within the Imagination Theatre program on radio stations and XM satellite radio. The new stories are also broadcast under the banner The Further Adventures of Sherlock Holmes. Holmes was played by John Gilbert until 2000, and subsequently by John Patrick Lowrie. Watson is played in all shows by Lawrence Albert. Scripts are by Jim French, M. J. Elliott, Matthew Booth, John Hall, Gareth Tilley, J R Campbell and Lawrence Albert. In 2005, with adaptations written by M. J. Elliott, French and his company began a new series based on Conan Doyle's original tales called The Classic Adventures of Sherlock Holmes. Many episodes are available on CD as well as downloadable from the Imagination Theatre website.

Several audio dramas have been produced by The Sherlock Holmes Society of London, starring Jim Crozier and Dave Hawkes as Holmes and Watson.

== Stage ==
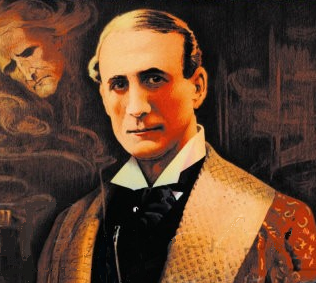
H. A. Saintsbury as Holmes, c. 1903

The first actor known to have played Holmes on stage is Charles Brookfield in November 1893, appearing at the Royal Court Theatre in Under the Clock, a musical parody of Holmes and Watson written with Seymour Hicks, who played Watson. However, the actor most associated with Holmes on stage is William Gillette, who wrote, directed, and starred in a popular play entitled Sherlock Holmes in seven different productions on Broadway from 1899 (filmed in 1916), while the stories were still being published, to 1930. His version of Holmes, dressed in deerstalker hat and Inverness cape and smoking a large curved calabash pipe, contributed much to the popular image of the character. The deerstalker hat appears occasionally in Paget's original illustrations for The Strand, but it is by no means a part of Holmes' regular clothing. Doyle's text is even vaguer, referring only to a travelling cap with earflaps in the passages with the relevant illustrations. He is also described as smoking several different types of pipes, varying them with his mood. The calabash pipe is associated with Sherlock Holmes because early portrayers, particularly Gillette and Basil Rathbone, made an artistic decision to use something large and easily recognized as a pipe. A calabash pipe has a large air chamber beneath the bowl that provides a cooling and mellowing effect. Holmes preferred harsh and strong tobaccos and therefore would eschew such a pipe. In fact, most stories, particularly "The Adventure of the Copper Beeches," described him as preferring a long-stemmed cherry-wood or a clay pipe.

In the first twenty years of the 20th century, Harry Arthur Saintsbury played Holmes on stage in Gillette's play more than 1,400 times. In subsequent revivals of this production, Holmes was played by John Wood, John Neville, Patrick Horgan, Robert Stephens and Leonard Nimoy. Frank Langella played Holmes in a 1981 production for HBO.

Holmes is tangentially referred to in an unfinished play by L. Frank Baum and Emerson Hough called The King of Gee-Whiz (1905).

In Langdon McCormick's 1905 play, The Burglar and the Lady, Holmes is pitted against the fictional criminal A. J. Raffles, created by E. W. Hornung. McCormick did not secure permission from either Doyle or Hornung to use their characters.

The Speckled Band is a 1910 play in three acts authored by Doyle himself adapted from "The Adventure of the Speckled Band" 1892 short story. Doyle cast H. A. Saintsbury, already known for portraying Holmes in Gillette's play and the play premiered on 4 June 1910 at the Adelphi Theatre.

In 1923, the play The Return of Sherlock Holmes ran for 130 performances at the Princes Theatre, London. It was written by Arthur Rose and J. E. Harold Terry, and starred Eille Norwood as Holmes and H. G. Stoker as Watson. One of the performances was attended by Conan Doyle.

A 1953 play written by Ouida Bergère (adapted from five of Conan Doyle's stories) and starring Basil Rathbone played on Broadway.

Sherlock's Last Case by Charles Marowitz ran on Broadway in 1987, starring Frank Langella.

The Secret of Sherlock Holmes by Jeremy Paul was staged in London's West End in 1988, with Jeremy Brett and Edward Hardwicke reprising their television roles as Holmes and Watson. It was revived in the summer of 2010 at the Duchess Theatre, this time starring television actors Peter Egan as Holmes and Robert Daws as Watson.

Two musicals – Baker Street in 1965, and Sherlock Holmes: The Musical in 1988 – have been written around Holmes.

Sherlock & Watson: Behind Closed Doors, a short play by Darren Stewart-Jones premiered at the Gay Play Day LGBTQ theatre festival in Toronto in 2013 and also played both the Hamilton Fringe Festival and the London One Act Festival in Ontario, Canada in 2014. The play imagines a romantic involvement between the two characters.

In 2007, Peepolykus Theatre Company premiered a new adaptation of The Hound of the Baskervilles at West Yorkshire Playhouse in Leeds. Adapted by John Nicholson and Steven Canny, directed by Orla O'Loughlin with Javier Marzan as Sherlock Holmes, the production involves only three actors. Following a UK tour, it transferred to the Duchess Theatre in London's West End. This adaptation continues to be presented by both amateur and professional companies around the world.

An abridged version of Peepolykus's adaptation was recorded in front of a live audience with the original cast for BBC Radio 4 (directed by Alison Hindell) and broadcast in 2012. A DVD of the stage version and CD of the radio version is available via the Peepolykus website.

In 2015, the Arena Stage in Southwest, Washington, D.C. premiered a comedic adaptation of The Hound of the Baskervilles authored by playwright Ken Ludwig entitled Baskerville: A Sherlock Holmes Mystery.

In 2021, Japanese all-female theater troupe Takarazuka Revue staged the musical based on Sherlock Holmes under the title "Sherlock Holmes -The Game Is Afoot!-". With the script and direction by Hirokazu Ikuta, the production featured Cosmos Troupe's Suzuho Makaze as Sherlock Holmes, Hana Jun as Irene Adler and Toa Serika as James Moriarty. DVD and Blu-Ray were released in September 2021. The story centered around Holmes trying to find the criminal mastermind in the figure of James Moriarty, this time through the connection they both have with an-American born opera singer Irene Adler.

In November 2025, a new comedy play called Sherlock Holmes and The 12 Days of Christmas by David Reed and Humphrey Ker, with original songs by Tim Rice and Andrew Lloyd Webber will premiere at the Birmingham Repertory Theatre.

== Television ==
There have been many television incarnations of Sherlock Holmes, varying in faithfulness to the source material from direct adaptations of Holmes stories, most notably The Hound of the Baskervilles, to new stories set in the present day and even the future.

=== Television series ===
Possibly the earliest television appearance was the 1951 British pilot episode, The Man Who Disappeared, based in part on the short story "The Man with the Twisted Lip"; the series was not sold. It starred John Longden as Holmes and Campbell Singer as Watson. It was shot on film and does survive today. The same year also saw the six-episode BBC miniseries Sherlock Holmes starring Alan Wheatley as Holmes and Raymond Francis as Watson. Unfortunately this series was broadcast live without recordings being made.

Three years later, the first American adaptation of Holmes and Watson, Sherlock Holmes was produced by Sheldon Reynolds in 1954, and starred Ronald Howard as Holmes and Howard Marion-Crawford as Doctor Watson, produced in Paris, France.

In the 1960s, there was a BBC TV series entitled Sherlock Holmes with Douglas Wilmer and Nigel Stock. Peter Cushing, who had earlier played the detective in the Hammer version of The Hound of the Baskervilles, later took over from Wilmer in the lead role.

The 24-part series Sherlock Holmes and Doctor Watson (1979–1980) starred Geoffrey Whitehead as Holmes and Donald Pickering as Watson.

In 1982, Granada Television aired an eight-part series entitled Young Sherlock: The Mystery of the Manor House which told the story of Holmes' youth. The show starred Guy Henry as Sherlock Holmes.

Also in 1982, the BBC produced an adaptation of The Hound of the Baskervilles, starring Tom Baker as the detective.

Jeremy Brett starred as Holmes in a Granada Television adaptation screened from 1984 to 1994, The Adventures of Sherlock Holmes, with David Burke and subsequently Edward Hardwicke as Watson. All but 18 of the Conan Doyle stories were filmed before Brett's death from a heart attack in 1995. Between 1984 and 1994, 36 episodes and five films were produced over six series. Brett and Hardwicke reprised their roles as Holmes and Watson in 1988–89 in a West End stage play, The Secret of Sherlock Holmes, written by Jeremy Paul.

An animated series, Sherlock Holmes in the 22nd Century, brings Holmes (voiced by Jason Gray-Stanford) into the future through the marvels of science.

There is also a Japanese animated series called Sherlock Hound, featuring anthropomorphic canine characters with the titular character voiced by Larry Moss in the English dub. Several of its episodes were directed by Hayao Miyazaki.

A second Japanese anime known as Case File nº221: Kabukicho serves as modern re-telling of the stories set in Japan where Sherlock Holmes (voiced by Katsuyuki Konishi) leads a team of detectives to solve a long string of serial murders committed by Jack the Ripper.

Another Japanese anime series called Case Closed, based on the manga of the same name, features a main character by the name of Conan who is heavily influenced by Sherlock Holmes.

The children's television series The Adventures of Shirley Holmes, which ran from 1996 to 1999, features a main young, modern-day female character (portrayed by Meredith Henderson) who claims to be a distant descendant of Sherlock Holmes himself and has inherited his intellect in solving crimes.

In 2007, the BBC released Sherlock Holmes and the Baker Street Irregulars, a children's series focusing on the Baker Street Irregulars and starring Jonathan Pryce as Holmes.

In 2009, the BBC began making Sherlock, created by Steven Moffat and Mark Gatiss, which updates the setting to 21st-century London. Four seasons of three 90-minute episodes each were broadcast in 2010, 2012, 2014 and 2017, starring Benedict Cumberbatch as Sherlock and Martin Freeman as John. Moriarty appears as a recurring villain. A special episode, "The Abominable Bride", was broadcast in January 2016, with a limited cinematic release worldwide. The fourth series aired January 1, 2017, with regards to it being potentially the final season – due to Cumberbatch and Freeman's busy schedules. The series also inspired a manga published in Japan, translated and published in US and UK by Titan Comics.

In fall 2012, CBS premiered the series Elementary, a contemporary remake set in the United States, starring Jonny Lee Miller as Holmes and Lucy Liu as a female version of Watson.

Sherlock Holmes has also been a prolific screen character in foreign language films, such as the Russian 2013 miniseries broadcast in November 2013.

Sherlok Kholms premiered in November 2013 on Russia-1. The eight episodes were filmed in Saint Petersburg, Russia, and starred Igor Petrenko as Holmes and Andrey Panin as Watson.

In 2014, NHK produced a puppetry Sherlock Holmes written by Kōki Mitani. It is set in Beeton School, a fictional boarding school and Holmes is a fifteen-year-old pupil who lives in the room 221B of Baker House and resolves the troubles in the school but there's no murder. In the show, John H. Watson is his roommate, Mrs Hudson is a housemother of Baker House and James Moriarty is deputy headmaster of the school.

Miss Sherlock premiered in 2018 and starred Yūko Takeuchi as Sara "Sherlock" Shelly Futaba and Shihori Kanjiya as Dr. Wato. Set in Tokyo, Japan, it is a co-production between HBO Asia and Hulu Japan.

The Scooby-Doo and Guess Who? episode "Elementary, My Dear Shaggy" has Mystery Inc. working with a man who claims to be Sherlock Holmes (voiced by Ian James Corlett) when it came to the mystery involving the screaming skulls. It was never confirmed in the episode if the man was the actual Sherlock Holmes or not.

In 2022, it was announced that Aaron Kaplan's Kapital Entertainment and former Elementary writer Craig Sweeny are developing Watson for CBS Studios. It is a medical drama series with detective elements, that focuses on Watson as the lead protagonist. Morris Chestnut is an executive producer in the series, and also stars as the title character. A plot focuses on Watson who, a year after Holmes's death at Moriarty's hands, resumes his medical career as the head of a clinic dedicated to treating rare disorders. Robert Carlyle portrays Holmes in a recurring capacity.

David Thewlis plays Holmes in the series Sherlock & Daughter, which focuses on him meeting Amelia Rojas, a young American claiming to be his daughter, as they take on a criminal syndicate known as the Red Thread.

Hero Fiennes Tiffin star in the Prime Video series Young Sherlock, which premiered in 2026. The series focuses on a 19 year old Holmes as he befriends a young James Moriarty and uncovers a deadly conspiracy linked to his own family.

The 2027 series The Death of Sherlock Holmes will depict the aftermath of the fight at the Reichenbach Falls, as Holmes (Rafe Spall) solves a case at the Swiss Alps.

=== Television movies ===
In the 1976 The Return of the World's Greatest Detective policemen Sherman Holmes suffers from a blow to the head resulting in him thinking he is Sherlock Holmes.

Also in 1976, Sherlock Holmes in New York, Sherlock Holmes (Roger Moore) and Dr. John Watson (Patrick McNee) travel to New York City to investigate a recent threat made by Professor Moriarty (John Huston). During their investigation, Holmes and Watson are reunited with their old acquaintance Irene Adler (Charlotte Rampling), now a popular music-hall singer, who reveals that Moriarty has kidnapped her son. Moriarty has also left a note for Holmes informing him that he will be approached by the police soon for aid in a crime, and should he not refuse – Moriarty also informing him that he should provide no reason for his refusal – the boy will die.

John Cleese starred as Holmes' grandson – Arthur Sherlock Holmes – in the comic TV special The Strange Case of the End of Civilization as We Know It (1977). Arthur Lowe played Dr. William Watson, the original doctor's grandson.

Between 1979 and 1986, Soviet television produced a series of five television films at the Lenfilm movie studio, The Adventures of Sherlock Holmes and Dr. Watson. The series were split into eleven episodes and starred Vasily Livanov as Holmes and Vitaly Solomin as Watson. Livanov earned honorary membership Order of the British Empire for a performance ambassador Anthony Brenton described as "one of the best I've ever seen".

In 1983, Ian Richardson portrayed Sherlock Holmes in The Sign of Four with David Healy as Dr. John H. Watson. Later that same year, Richardson again played Holmes in a version of The Hound of the Baskervilles with Donald Churchill as his Watson.

Also in 1983 Australian production company Burbank Films (later Burbank Animation Studios) released a series of animated TV specials based on the four full-length novels, starring Peter O'Toole as Holmes and Earle Cross as Watson. The films were entitled Sherlock Holmes and a Study in Scarlet, Sherlock Holmes and the Sign of Four, Sherlock Holmes and the Baskerville Curse, and Sherlock Holmes and the Valley of Fear.

In 1986, a TV movie called My Tenderly Loved Detective was made in Soviet Union about the adventures of the female Sherlock Holmes, called Shirley Holmes here, and female Dr.Watson, called Jane Watson here.

The contemporarily-set 1987 television movie The Return of Sherlock Holmes starred Michael Pennington as the detective and Margaret Colin as Dr. Watson's granddaughter, Jane. Jane, after following directions written by her grandfather years ago, finds out that she has thawed Holmes who had been cryogenically frozen by Dr. Watson for 88 years due to Bubonic plague. They become a team – the essential Victorian gentleman and a post-feminist young woman – to solve a case that combines elements of "The Sign of the Four" with elements from the celebrated news story of a plane hijacked for ransom by D. B. Cooper.

Edward Woodward appeared as Holmes in the 1990 TV movie Hands of a Murderer, alongside John Hillerman as Watson, and Anthony Andrews as Moriarty.

The 1991–92 series Sherlock Holmes the Golden Years consisted of two TV films, in which Sherlock Holmes (played again by Christopher Lee) and Dr. Watson (played by Patrick Macnee) are older adults who continue investigating cases. The two films were Incident at Victoria Falls and Sherlock Holmes and the Leading Lady.

In 1991, Charlton Heston played Holmes in the Turner Network Television production of Paul Giovanni's play The Crucifer of Blood.

In 1993, television movie titled 1994 Baker Street: Sherlock Holmes Returns and starring Anthony Higgins as Holmes and Debrah Farentino as Amy Winslow. Holmes is awakened from suspended animation in the future following an earthquake and must face off against the descendants of Moriarty.

From 2000 to 2002, Muse Entertainment Enterprises produced four television films for the Hallmark Channel, starring Matt Frewer as Holmes and Kenneth Welsh as Dr Watson, in The Hound of the Baskervilles (2000), The Royal Scandal (2001), The Sign of Four (2001) and The Case of the Whitechapel Vampire (2002).

2002 saw a new version of The Hound of the Baskervilles featuring Richard Roxburgh. Ian Hart played Dr. Watson then and also in the 2004 BBC airing of Sherlock Holmes and the Case of the Silk Stocking, alternatively billed as The Return of Sherlock Holmes. An original screenplay "based on the character created by Sir Arthur Conan Doyle", this film takes place in 1902, with Dr. Watson "saving a dear friend from narcotics and boredom", this friend being an opium-addicted and increasingly weak Sherlock Holmes. Rupert Everett plays the Great Detective.

2002 also saw the made for television cable movie, Case of Evil, about a 20-something Sherlock Holmes (James D'Arcy) and a Doctor Watson who worked as an early practitioner of autopsies, on the trail of Holmes' archenemy, Professor Moriarty (Vincent D'Onofrio).

=== Episodes of unrelated series ===
An adaptation of The Speckled Band aired on the 1949 TV anthology series Your Show Time, and starred Alan Napier as Holmes and Melville Cooper as Watson.

John Cleese played Holmes in a 1973 episode of "Comedy Playhouse": Elementary My Dear Watson. William Rushton played Watson.

Also in 1988, in the animated series BraveStarr, the two-part episode "Sherlock Holmes in the 23rd Century" had Holmes transported from Reichenbach Falls in 1893, to London in 2249, gaining the power to shoot electricity form his hands in the process. Holmes is joined by an alien, Dr. W't'sn (the 23rd century counterpart of Watson) and Inspector Mycroft Holmes of Scotland Yard (a direct descendant and namesake of Holmes' brother Mycroft); the trio are recruited by the eponymous hero, Marshal BraveStarr, to investigate the hijackings of ore freighters. They discover Professor Moriarty is behind the hijackings and a nefarious plot to brainwash and enslave the population of Earth through hypnotism; after Holmes' presumed death in 1893, Moriarty built and used a stasis device to sleep until Holmes reappeared in 2249. Holmes and his friends foil Moriarty's plot, and Moriarty is arrested.

The android Lt. Commander Data (Brent Spiner) from Star Trek: The Next Generation had a personal interest of visiting the holodeck and playing Sherlock Holmes with his friend Geordi La Forge (LeVar Burton) as Dr John H. Watson, as can be seen in two episodes of the series: "Elementary, Dear Data", and "Ship in a Bottle". On these occasions, Data would replay and try to solve some of his favourite Holmes stories, or let the computer improvise a new mystery in the style of Doyle's stories. On most of these occasions, these exercises would result in a quick solution, since his android brain would immediately pick up all available clues, and his superior deductive skills would quickly solve the problem. Attempting to let the computer create a more difficult mystery for him however, resulted in the computer creating a holographic Professor James Moriarty which was imbued with a measure of consciousness, and who formed the basis for a story arc for said two episodes. The holographic Moriarty quickly caused problems when he realised he was a holodeck creation, and demanded a 'full' life, with the possibility to leave the holodeck.

The children's television series Wishbone featured Holmes and Watson in two episodes: "The Slobbery Hound" (based on The Hound of the Baskervilles) and "A Dogged Exposé" (A Scandal in Bohemia).

Holmes and Watson appear in the Batman: The Brave and the Bold episode "Trials of the Demon!", respectively voiced by Ian Buchanan and Jim Piddock. In the episode, Batman is transported back in time to help them and Etrigan the Demon fight Gentleman Ghost.

== Video games ==
Sherlock Holmes and his world are also used in video game universe as computer games and video games. The great majority of his appearances are pastiches.

- In the mobile game Fate/Grand Order (2015), Sherlock Holmes is capable of being summoned as a 5-star Ruler Class Servant.
- In the MMORPG Wizard101 (2008), there is a character based on Holmes, named "Sherlock Bones".
- Sherlock Holmes is one of the main characters in the duology The Great Ace Attorney: Adventures (2015) and The Great Ace Attorney 2: Resolve (2017). His portrayal in the games, although more comical than usual, is heavily based in almost all of his known habits and skills, with his deductions being one of the main gimmicks of the games. Due to copyright concerns, Holmes is named "Herlock Sholmes" in international releases of the games.
- In the 2020 mobile video game Sherlock: Hidden Match-3 Cases, developed by G5 Entertainment, Sherlock Holmes appears as one of the central characters.

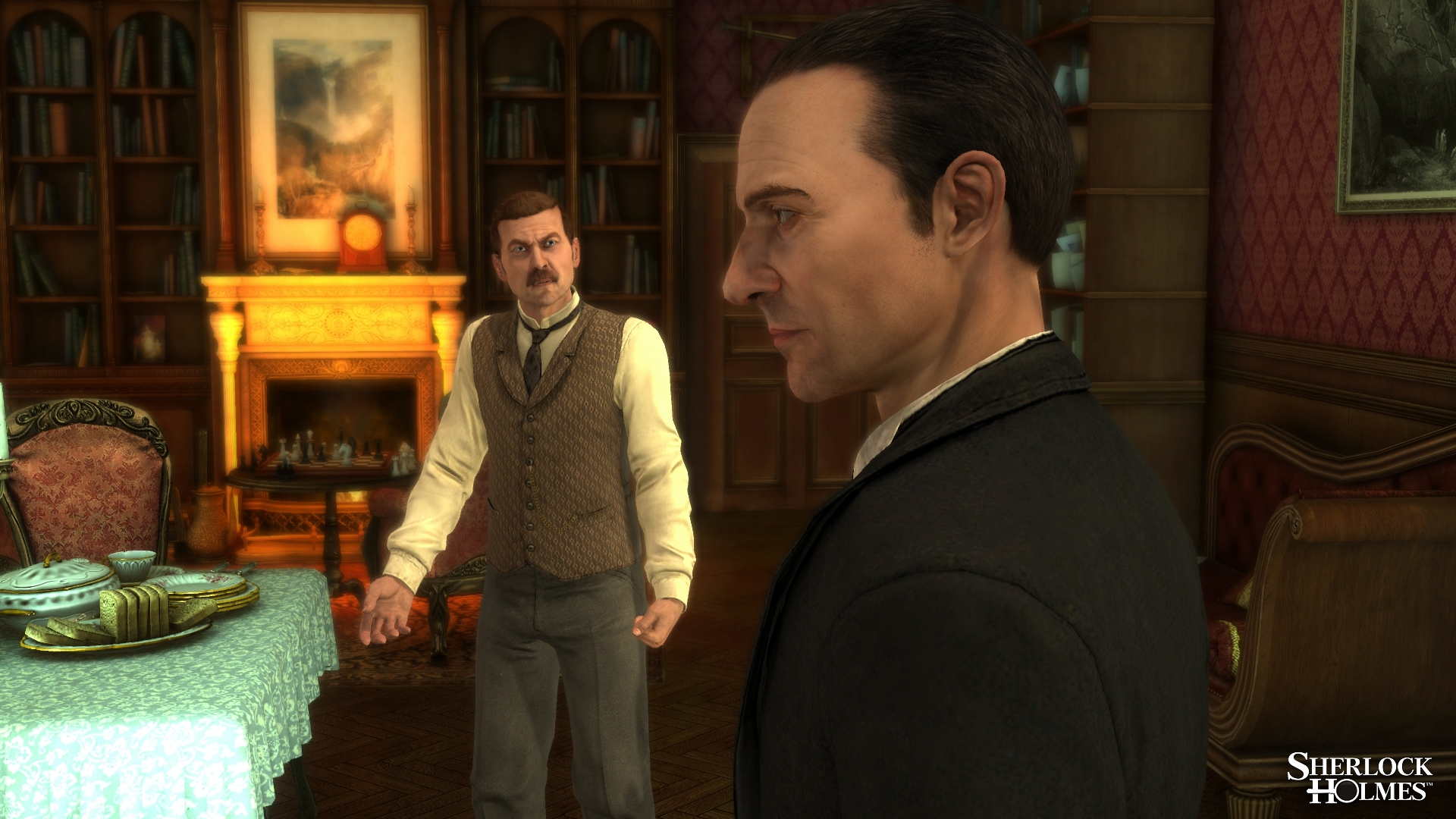
Holmes and Watson in Frogwares' The Testament of Sherlock Holmes (2012)

The vast majority of Holmes games have been, and continue to be, published by the games company Frogwares. The company has produced 13 Sherlock Holmes games, most of which fall under the adventure, puzzle, or hidden object genera. Most of these games are pastiches, however a few are (or contain) adaptations of the original stories. Frogwares' Holmes products are:

- Sherlock Holmes: The Mystery of the Mummy (2002) for Windows PC and Nintendo DS.
- Sherlock Holmes: The Case of the Silver Earring (2004) for Windows PC and Nintendo Wii.
- Sherlock Holmes: The Awakened (2007) for Windows PC.
- Sherlock Holmes vs. Arsène Lupin (2007) for Windows PC.
- The Adventures of Sherlock Holmes: The Mystery of the Persian Carpet (2008).
- Sherlock Holmes vs. Jack the Ripper (2009) for Windows PC and Xbox 360.
- Sherlock Holmes and the Mystery of Osborne House (2011).
- Sherlock Holmes and the Hound of the Baskervilles (2011).
- The Testament of Sherlock Holmes (2012) for Windows PC, Xbox 360, and PS3.
- Sherlock Holmes and the Mystery of the Frozen City (2013) for Nintendo 3DS.
- Sherlock Holmes: Crime & Punishments (2014) for Windows PC, Xbox 360, Xbox One, PS3, and PS4.
- Sherlock Holmes: The Devil's Daughter (2016) for Windows PC, Xbox One, and PS4.
- Sherlock Holmes Chapter One (2021) for Windows PC as well as 8th Gen and 9th Gen home consoles.
- Sherlock Holmes: The Awakened (2023) for Windows PC as well as 8th Gen and 9th Gen home consoles.

Mythos Software developed two adventure games based on Doyle's writings. They are not parodies but try to be faithful to the original material, even though the story in both games is an original creation. In both, Holmes is the player character. They are The Lost Files of Sherlock Holmes: The Case of the Serrated Scalpel (1992) and The Lost Files of Sherlock Holmes: The Case of the Rose Tattoo (1996). Both games were designed by R. J. Berg and published by Electronic Arts. Both were released for MS-DOS, and the first game was also ported in 1994 to the 3DO.

March 2025 saw the release of the indie game The Beekeeper's Picnic, a cozy point-and-click adventure game. The plot follows a retired Holmes, now a beekeeper in Sussex, trying to set up a picnic for Watson, only for several mysteries to interrupt his goal.

== See also ==
- List of actors who have played Sherlock Holmes
- Popular culture references to Sherlock Holmes

== Literature ==
- Peter Haining, The Television Sherlock Holmes, W.H. Allen, London, 1986. ISBN 0-491-03055-X.
