= List of actors who have played Sherlock Holmes =

Sherlock Holmes is the most portrayed literary human character in film and television history, having appeared on screen 254 times as of 2012. Additionally, many actors have portrayed Sherlock Holmes in audio dramas and stage productions.

== Radio and audio dramas ==
Name	Title	Date	Type
Edward H. Smith	The Sign of the Four	1922	Radio (WGY)
William Gillette	The Adventures of Sherlock Holmes – "The Adventure of the Speckled Band"	1930	Radio (NBC Blue Network)
William Gillette	Lux Radio Theatre – "Sherlock Holmes"	1935	Radio adaptation of the play (NBC)
Clive Brook	The Adventures of Sherlock Holmes – "A Scandal in Bohemia", "The Red-Headed League"	1930	Radio (NBC)
Richard Gordon	The Adventures of Sherlock Holmes	1930–1933, 1936	Radio (Mutual, NBC)
Louis Hector	The Adventures of Sherlock Holmes	1934–1935	Radio (NBC)
Orson Welles	The Mercury Theatre on the Air – "Sherlock Holmes"	1938	Radio adaptation of the play (CBS)
Basil Rathbone	The New Adventures of Sherlock Holmes	1939–1946	Radio (Blue Network, Mutual)
Arthur Wontner	The Boscombe Valley Mystery	1943	BBC Home Service
John Cheatle	My Dear Watson	1943	BBC Home Service
Cedric Hardwicke	The Adventure of the Speckled Band	1945	BBC Home Service
Laidman Browne	Silver Blaze	1945	BBC Home Service
Tom Conway	The New Adventures of Sherlock Holmes	1946–1947	Radio (ABC)
John Stanley	The New Adventures of Sherlock Holmes	1947–1949	Radio (Mutual)
Howard Marion-Crawford	The Adventure of the Speckled Band	1948	BBC Home Service
Ben Wright	The New Adventures of Sherlock Holmes	1949–1950	Radio (ABC)
Carleton Hobbs	Sherlock Holmes	1952–1969	Radio (BBC series)
John Gielgud	The Adventures of Sherlock Holmes	1954	Radio series (BBC Light Programme)
Richard Hurndall	The Sign of Four Parts 1–5	1959	BBC Light Programme
Robert Langford	Sherlock Holmes	1967	South African Broadcasting Corporation
Robert Hardy	Sherlock Holmes	1970–1971	LP record series
Robert Powell	A Study in Scarlet	1974	BBC Radio 4
Kevin McCarthy	CBS Radio Mystery Theater	1977	Radio (CBS)
Barry Foster	Sherlock Holmes	1978	Radio series (BBC Radio 4)
Graham Armitage	The Stories of Sherlock Holmes	1979–1985	Radio series (Springbok Radio)
John Beal	CBS Radio Mystery Theater – "The Vanishing Herd"	1981	Radio (CBS)
Gordon Gould	CBS Radio Mystery Theater	1981–1982	Radio (CBS)
John Moffatt	Sherlock Holmes vs. Dracula	1981	BBC radio dramatisation of the novel
Mark Wing-Davey	The Mystery of the Reluctant Storyteller	1986	BBC Radio 4
Tim Pigott-Smith	The Valley of Fear	1986	BBC Radio 4
Roger Rees	The Hound of the Baskervilles	1988	BBC Radio 4
Ronald Pickup	The Singular Case of Sherlock H. and Sigmund F.	1988	BBC Radio 3
Clive Merrison	BBC Radio Sherlock Holmes (the entire canon – the first actor to do so)	1989–1998	BBC Radio 4
Clive Merrison	The Further Adventures of Sherlock Holmes (British series)	2002–2010	BBC Radio 4
William Chubb	The Adventure of the Pimlico Poisoner	1990	BBC Radio 4
Simon Callow	The Seven-Per-Cent Solution	1993	BBC radio dramatisation of the novel
Simon Callow	The Unopened Casebook of Sherlock Holmes	1993	Radio series (BBC Radio 5)
John Gilbert	The Further Adventures of Sherlock Holmes (American series)	1998–2000	Radio series (Imagination Theatre)
Roy Hudd	The Newly Discovered Casebook of Sherlock Holmes	1999	BBC Radio 2
James Fox	The Beekeeper's Apprentice	2000	BBC Radio 4
Robert Bathurst	A Capital Case: Karl Marx Meets Sherlock Holmes	2001	BBC Radio 4
John Patrick Lowrie	The Further Adventures of Sherlock Holmes (American series)	2001–present	Radio series (Imagination Theatre)
John Patrick Lowrie	The Classic Adventures of Sherlock Holmes (the entire canon)	2005–2016	Radio series (Imagination Theatre)
Martin Jarvis	Sherlock Holmes Theatre	2006	Hollywood Theatre of the Ear
Roger Llewellyn	Sherlock Holmes – The Death and Life, Sherlock Holmes – The Last Act	2009	Audio dramas (Big Finish Productions)
Nicholas Briggs	Sherlock Holmes	2010–present	Audio dramas (Big Finish Productions)
David Warner	Sherlock Holmes	2011	California Artists Radio Theatre
Mir Afsar Ali	Sunday Suspense	2012–present	Radio Mirchi / Goppo Mir-er Thek
Seamus Dever	The Hound of the Baskervilles	2014	Audio drama (L.A. Theatre Works)
Derek Jacobi	The Hound of the Baskervilles	2017	Audio play (Bleak December Inc.)
Orlando Wells	Mrs Hudson's Radio Show	2018	BBC Radio 4
James Loye	Genius	2019–2020	Scripted podcast
Nicholas Boulton	Sherlock Holmes: The Voice of Treason	2020	Audio drama (Audible Original)
Albert Garnica	Madison on the Air	2021–present	Scripted podcast
Jonathan Le Billon	The Blue Carbuncle	2021	Scripted reading
Colin Salmon	The Hound of the Baskervilles	2021	Audio drama (Audible Original)
Phil LaMarr	Moriarty	2022–2026	Audio drama (Audible Original)
Mark Gatiss	Drama on 3 - "The Hound of the Baskervilles"	2023	BBC Radio 3
Paterson Joseph	Baker Street Four	2023	Audible Original
Harry Attwell	Sherlock & Co.	2023–present	Scripted podcast (Goalhanger Podcasts)
Simon Jones	Sherlock Holmes & the Nefarious Baron	2026	Live radio play (American)
Tom Baker	Sir Sherlock	2026–	Audio drama (British)

== Stage plays ==
Name	Title	Date	Type and location
C.H.E. Brookfield	Under the Clock	1893	Stage (Royal Court Theatre)
John Webb	Sherlock Holmes	1894	Stage (Royalty Theatre, Glasgow)
William Gillette	Sherlock Holmes	1899	Stage (Broadway)
William Gillette	The Painful Predicament of Sherlock Holmes	1905	Stage (Metropolitan Opera House)
John F. Preston	The Bank of England: An Adventure in the Life of Sherlock Holmes	1900	Stage (Clapham)
Clarence Blakiston	Sheerluck Jones, or Why D'Gillette Him Off	1901–1902	Stage (Terry's Theatre)
Walter Edwards	The Sign of the Four	1903	Stage (West End Theater)
Herbert Kelcey	Sherlock Holmes	1903	Stage (Broadway Theatre, Butte, Montana); Stage (Spokane Theatre, Spokane, Washington)
Harry Arthur Saintsbury	Sherlock Holmes	1903–1910	Stage (London)
Harry Arthur Saintsbury	The Speckled Band	1910	Stage (London)
Kenneth Rivington	Sherlock Holmes	1904–1905	Stage (UK tour)
H. Lawrence Leyton	Sherlock Holmes	1905–1906	Stage (UK tour)
Károly Baumann	Sherlock Hohmec, the King of Detectives	1905	Stage (Hungary)
Arthur V. Johnson	The Burglar and the Lady	1905–1906	Stage (US)
H. Hamilton Stewart	Sherlock Holmes	1906–1918	Stage (England)
Ferdinand Bonn	Sherlock Holmes	1906	Stage (Berliner Theatre)
Ferdinand Bonn	Der Hund Von Baskerville	1907	Stage (Berliner Theatre)
Dennis Neilson-Terry	The Crown Diamond	1921	Stage (London)
Eille Norwood	The Return of Sherlock Holmes	1923	Stage (UK)
Hamilton Deane	Sherlock Holmes	1923–1932	Stage (UK)
Tod Slaughter	The Return of Sherlock Holmes	1928	Stage (England)
Felix Aylmer	The Holmeses of Baker Street	1933	Stage (Lyceum Theatre)
Tod Slaughter	Sherlock Holmes	1930 (~)	Stage
Basil Rathbone	"Sherlock Holmes" by Ouida Bergère	1953	Stage play
Fritz Weaver	Baker Street	1965	Stage musical (Broadway Theatre, NYC)
John Neville	Sherlock Holmes	1973 (~)	Stage (Royal Shakespeare Company)
John Wood	Sherlock Holmes	1974–1976	Stage (Broadway)
Leonard Nimoy	Sherlock Holmes	1976	Stage (Royal Shakespeare Company)
Frank Langella	Sherlock Holmes	1977, 1981	Stage (Williamstown Theatre Festival), filmed for TV in 1981
Frank Langella	Sherlock's Last Case	1987	Stage (Nederlander Theatre)
Paxton Whitehead	The Crucifer of Blood	1978	Stage (Broadway)
Keith Michell	The Crucifer of Blood	1979	Stage (London)
Valentīns Skulme	Šerloks Holmss	1979	Stage (Latvia)
Keith Baxter	The Penultimate Problem of Sherlock Holmes	1980	Stage (Off-Broadway)
Keith Baxter	Murder Dear Watson	1983	Stage (UK)
Paul Singleton	Grit in a Sensitive Instrument	1980, 1982, 1994	Stage (regional theatre, Off-Broadway), cable TV, FSU/Asolo Conservatory
Paul Singleton	The Blue Carbuncle	2007–2008 2022	Stage (Off Broadway, Los Angeles)
Paul Singleton	A Requiem for Sherlock Holmes	2013	Stage (Off Broadway)
Paul Singleton	The Lost Document	1991	Stage (regional theater)
Charlton Heston	The Crucifer of Blood	1981	Stage (Los Angeles)
Charlton Heston	Sherlock's Last Case	1990	Stage (Broadway)
Tom Baker	The Mask of Moriarty	1985	Stage (Dublin)
Alec Baldwin	A Study in Scarlet	1987	Stage (The Free Theatre, Williamstown Theatre Festival)
Jeremy Brett	The Secret of Sherlock Holmes	1988–1989	Stage (touring, British)
Time Winters	Sherlock Holmes and the Hands of Othello	1987	Stage (Off-Off Broadway, NY)
Ron Moody	Sherlock Holmes: The Musical	1989	Stage
Christopher Lloyd	Sherlock Holmes	1990	Stage (The Weston Playhouse)
Javier Marzan	The Hound of the Baskervilles	2007	Stage (West Yorkshire Playhouse)
Jay Baruchel	Sherlock Holmes	2013	Play by Greg Kramer (Canada)
Julien Masdoua	Le Cabaret Sherlock Holmes	2013	Stage (France)
Benjamin Lawlor	The Hound of the Baskervilles	2013	Stage (UK)
Simon Michael Morgan	Sherlock Holmes and the Case of the Christmas Carol	2013	Stage (Britain)
Peter Land	To Kill a Canary	2014	Stage (Britain)
Gregory Wooddell	Baskerville: A Sherlock Holmes Mystery	2015	Arena Stage in Southwest (Washington, D.C.)
Euan Morton	Baskerville: A Sherlock Holmes Mystery	2015	Old Globe Theatre in San Diego, California
Paul Andrew Goldsmith	Sherlock Holmes & the Case of the Christmas Carol	2015–2016	UK theatre tour
David Arquette	Sherlock Holmes	2015	Play by Greg Kramer
Jay Taylor	Baskerville: A Sherlock Holmes Mystery	2017–2018	Liverpool Playhouse
Luke Barton	Sherlock Holmes – The Sign of Four	2018–2019	UK theatre tour
Alan Tudyk	Mysterious Circumstances	2019	Geffen Playhouse (America)
Collin Conway	The Hound of the Baskervilles	2022	Stage (Encore Center Theatre, Southern Pines, North Carolina, USA)
Danny Richter	Sherlock Holmes und der Hund der Baskervilles	2023–2025	European theatre tour
Colin Baker	The Hound of the Baskervilles	2022–2025	Live radio play reading, UK tour
Colin Baker	The Sign of Four	2025–2026	Live radio play reading, UK tour
Ed Hawkins	Sherlock Holmes and the Sign of Four	2024	Opera (UK)
Dave Hearn	The Hound of the Baskervilles	2024	Stage (Britain)
Humphrey Ker	Sherlock Holmes and The 12 Days of Christmas	2025–2026	Stage (Britain)

== Television and DTV films ==
Name	Title	Date	Type
Louis Hector	The Three Garridebs	1937	Television play for NBC (American)
John Longden	The Man Who Disappeared	1951	Television pilot (British)
Andrew Osborn	The Mazarin Stone	1951	Television film for BBC (British)
Stewart Granger	The Hound of the Baskervilles	1972	Television film (American)
John Cleese	Comedy Playhouse series 13 – "Elementary, My Dear Watson"	1973	Television film (British)
Roger Moore	Sherlock Holmes in New York	1976	Television film (American)
Christopher Plummer	Silver Blaze	1977	Television film (Canadian)
John Cleese	The Strange Case of the End of Civilisation as We Know It	1977	Television film (British)
Algimantas Masiulis	Blue Carbuncle	1980	Television film (Belarusfilm)
Frank Langella	Standing Room Only – Sherlock Holmes	1981	Television play for HBO (American)
Tom Baker	The Hound of the Baskervilles	1982	Television serial in four parts (British)
Peter O'Toole	Sherlock Holmes and the Valley of Fear	1983	Animated television film (Australian)
Peter O'Toole	Sherlock Holmes and the Sign of Four	1983	Animated television film (Australian)
Peter O'Toole	Sherlock Holmes and the Baskerville Curse	1983	Animated television film (Australian)
Peter O'Toole	Sherlock Holmes and a Study in Scarlet	1983	Animated television film (Australian)
Ian Richardson	The Sign of Four	1983	Television films (British-American)
Ian Richardson	The Hound of the Baskervilles	1983	Television films (British-American)
Peter Cushing	The Masks of Death	1984	Television film (British)
Guy Rolfe	The Case of Marcel Duchamp	1984	Television film (British)
Michael Pennington	The Return of Sherlock Holmes	1987	Television film (American)
Edward Woodward	Hands of a Murderer	1990	Television film (American)
Charlton Heston	The Crucifer of Blood	1991	Television film adaptation of the play (American)
Christopher Lee	Sherlock Holmes and the Leading Lady	1991	Television films
Christopher Lee	Incident at Victoria Falls	1992	Television films
Patrick Macnee	The Hound of London	1993	Television film (Luxembourgian/Canadian)
Anthony Higgins	Sherlock Holmes Returns	1993	Television film (American)
Matt Frewer	The Case of the Whitechapel Vampire	2002	Television films (Canadian)
Matt Frewer	The Sign of Four	2001	Television films (Canadian)
Matt Frewer	The Royal Scandal	2001	Television films (Canadian)
Matt Frewer	The Hound of the Baskervilles	2000	Television films (Canadian)
James D'Arcy	Sherlock: Case of Evil	2002	Television film (American)
Richard Roxburgh	The Hound of the Baskervilles	2002	Television film (British)
Rupert Everett	Sherlock Holmes and the Case of the Silk Stocking	2004	Television film (British)
Jonathan Pryce	Sherlock Holmes and the Baker Street Irregulars	2007	Television film (British)
Ben Syder	Sherlock Holmes	2010	DTV film (American)
Michael York	Tom and Jerry Meet Sherlock Holmes	2010	Animated DTV film; voice only (American)
Anthony D.P. Mann	Sherlock Holmes and the Shadow Watchers	2011	DTV film (Canadian)
Ivan Kaye	Sherlock Holmes Confidential	2013	Online short film (British)
Edward Cartwright	How Sherlock Changed the World	2013	Documentary (American)
Vernon Dobtcheff	L'hypothèse de la reine rouge	2018	Online short film (French)
Daniel Jagusz-Holley	Mr Sherlock Holmes	2025	Short film
Jack Chambers	Holmes: The Myth of Whitechapel	2025	Short film/television pilot
Adam Fergus	Public Domain	2025	Animated pilot
Ford Leland	Moriarty Rising: A Sherlock Holmes Tale	2027	Microdrama/feature film dual release (American-Italian)

== Television series ==
Name	Title	Date	Type
Milton Berle	Texaco Star Theatre – "Sherlock Holmes in the Mystery of the Sen Sen Murder"	1949	TV episode (American)
Alan Napier	Your Show Time – "The Speckled Band"	1949	TV episode (American)
Alan Wheatley	Sherlock Holmes	1951	TV series (British)
Basil Rathbone	Suspense – "The Adventure of the Black Baronet"	1953	TV episode (American)
Ronald Howard	Sherlock Holmes	1954–1955	TV series (American)
Boris Karloff	The Elgin Hour – "Sting of Death"	1955	Based on the novel A Taste for Honey (American)
Graham Crowden	Endless Adventure – "Episode dated 7 December 1959"	1959	TV episode (British)
Douglas Wilmer	Detective – "The Speckled Band"	1964	Backdoor pilot for the 1965 series (British)
Douglas Wilmer	Sherlock Holmes	1965	TV series (British)
Erich Schellow	Sherlock Holmes	1967–1968	TV series (German)
Peter Cushing	Sir Arthur Conan Doyle's Sherlock Holmes	1968	TV series (British)
Nando Gazzolo	Sherlock Holmes	1968	TV series (Italian)
Vasily Livanov	The Adventures of Sherlock Holmes and Dr. Watson	1979–1986	TV film series (USSR)
Geoffrey Whitehead	Sherlock Holmes and Doctor Watson	1979	TV series (American-Polish)
Dudley Stevens/David Simeon	End of Part One – "The Adventures of Sherlock Holmes"	1979	TV sketch (British)
Peter Lawford	Fantasy Island – "Save Sherlock Holmes"	1982	TV episode (American)
Guy Henry	Young Sherlock: The Mystery of the Manor House	1982	TV series (British)
Roger Ostime	The Baker Street Boys	1983	TV series (British)
Jeremy Brett	Sherlock Holmes	1984–1994	TV series (British)
Taichirō Hirokawa	Sherlock Hound	1984–1985	TV animated series (Italian-Japanese) (Japanese version)
Larry Moss	Sherlock Hound	1984–1985	TV animated series (Italian-Japanese) (English dub)
Elio Pandolfi	Sherlock Hound	1984–1985	TV animated series (Italian-Japanese) (Italian dub)
Pat Fraley	BraveStarr – "Sherlock Holmes in the 23rd Century" Parts 1 and 2	1988	Animated TV episodes (American)
Ross Bagdasarian, Jr.	Alvin and the Chipmunks – "Elementary, My Dear Simon"	1988	Animated TV episodes (American)
Brian Bedford	Alfred Hitchcock Presents – "My Dear Watson"	1989	TV episode (American)
Alan Shearman	The Real Ghostbusters – "Elementary My Dear Wintson"	1989	Animated TV episode (American)
Kenneth Mars	Garfield and Friends – "Hound of the Arbuckles/U.S. Acres: Read Alert/Urban Arbuckle"	1990	Animated TV episode (American)
Peter Renaday	Teenage Mutant Ninja Turtles – "Elementary, My Dear Turtle"	1990	Animated TV episode (American)
Jeremy Irons	Saturday Night Live – "Sherlock Holmes' Birthday Party"	1991	TV sketch (American)
Neil Patrick Harris	Doogie Howser, M.D. – "The Adventures of Sherlock Howser"	1993	TV episode (American)
Peter Capaldi	The All New Alexei Sayle Show – "Sherlock Holmes & Watson"	1994	TV sketch (British)
Jason Gray-Stanford	Sherlock Holmes in the 22nd Century	1999–2001	Animated TV series (American-British)
Robert Webb	That Mitchell and Webb Look – "Holmes and Watson"	2007	TV sketch (British)
Ian Buchanan	Batman: The Brave and the Bold – "Trials of the Demon!"	2009	Animated TV episode (American)
David Mitchell	That Mitchell and Webb Look – "Old Sherlock Holmes"	2010	TV sketch (British)
Benedict Cumberbatch	Sherlock	2010–2017	TV series (British)
Alexander Armstrong	The Armstrong & Miller Show	2010	TV sketch (British)
Jonny Lee Miller	Elementary	2012–2019	TV series (American)
Zach Sherwin	Epic Rap Battles of History – "Batman vs. Sherlock Holmes"	2012	Online series episode (American)
Igor Petrenko	Sherlock Holmes	2013	TV series (Russian)
Louis Oliver Moffat	Sherlock – Flashbacks of Holmes as a child	2013	TV series (British)
Kōichi Yamadera	Sherlock Holmes	2014–2015	TV series (Japanese)
Ewan Bremner	Houdini & Doyle – "Bedlam"	2016	TV episode (American)
Mark Caven	Houdini & Doyle – "The Pall of LaPier"	2016	TV episode (American)
Yūji Oda	IQ246: The Cases of a Royal Genius	2016	TV series (Japanese)
Yūko Takeuchi	Miss Sherlock	2018	TV series (Japanese)
Dean Fujioka	Sherlock: Untold Stories	2019	TV series (Japanese)
Katsuyuki Konishi	Case File no. 221: Kabukicho	2019–2020	TV anime series (Japanese)
Ian Sinclair	Case File no. 221: Kabukicho	2019–2020	TV anime series (English dub)
Camilla Arfwedson	Ghostwriter – "The Case of The Missing Ghost"	2020	TV series (American-Canadian)
Maksim Matveyev	Sherlock in Russia	2020	TV series (Russian)
Makoto Furukawa	Moriarty the Patriot	2020–2021	TV anime series (Japanese)
Theo Devaney	Moriarty the Patriot	2021	TV anime series (English dub)
Henry Lloyd-Hughes	The Irregulars	2021	TV series (British-American)
Masato Obara	Lupin the 3rd Part 6	2021–2022	TV anime series (Japanese)
Yong Yea	Lupin the 3rd Part 6	2022	TV anime series (English dub)
Shin-ichiro Miki	Undead Girl Murder Farce	2023	TV anime series (Japanese)
Mark Gatiss	Inside Classical - "The Hound of the Baskervilles"	2023	Televised concert (British)
Kay Kay Menon	Shekhar Home	2024	TV series (Indian)
Matt Berry	Watson - "Teeth Marks"	2025	TV series (American)
David Thewlis	Sherlock & Daughter	2025–present	TV series (American-British)
Robert Carlyle	Watson	2025–2026	TV series (American)
Hero Fiennes Tiffin	Young Sherlock	2026–present	TV series (British)
José Coronado	The Final Problem	2026	TV miniseries (Spanish)
Rafe Spall	The Death of Sherlock Holmes	2027	TV series (Swiss-German-Belgian)

== Theatrical films ==
Name	Title	Date	Type
Broncho Billy Anderson	Adventures of Sherlock Holmes; or, Held for Ransom	1905	Silent films (American)
Broncho Billy Anderson	Sherlock Holmes in the Great Murder Mystery	1908	Silent films (American)
Alwin Neuß	Sherlock Holmes	1908	Silent films (German)
Alwin Neuß	The Stolen Legacy (Den stjaalne millionobligation)	1911	Silent films (German)
Alwin Neuß	Detektiv Braun	1914	Silent films (German)
Alwin Neuß	Der Hund von Baskerville	1914	Silent films (German)
Viggo Larsen	Sherlock Holmes in Deathly Danger	1908	One-reel short films (Danish)
Viggo Larsen	Raffles Escapes From Prison	1908	One-reel short films (Danish)
Viggo Larsen	The Secret Document	1908	One-reel short films (Danish)
Viggo Larsen	Arsène Lupin contra Sherlock Holmes	1910	Silent film (German)
Otto Lagoni	Sherlock Holmes i Bondefangerklør	1910	Silent short films (Danish)
Otto Lagoni	The Bogus Governess (Den forklædte barnepige)	1911	Silent short films (Danish)
Otto Lagoni	The Black Hand (Den sorte Haand)	1911	Silent short films (Danish)
Otto Lagoni	A Confidence Trick	1911	Silent short films (Danish)
Einar Zangenberg	Hotel Thieves	1911	Silent short film (Danish)
Lauritz Olsen	Den sorte hætte	1911	Silent film (Danish)
Mack Sennett	The $500 Reward	1911	Silent short film (American)
Georges Tréville	The Speckled Band	1912	Éclair series short films (British-French)
Georges Tréville	Silver Blaze	1912	Éclair series short films (British-French)
Georges Tréville	The Beryl Coronet	1912	Éclair series short films (British-French)
Georges Tréville	The Musgrave Ritual	1912	Éclair series short films (British-French)
Georges Tréville	The Reigate Squares	1912	Éclair series short films (British-French)
Georges Tréville	The Stolen Papers	1912	Éclair series short films (British-French)
Georges Tréville	The Mystery of Boscombe Valley	1912	Éclair series short films (British-French)
Georges Tréville	The Copper Beeches	1912	Éclair series short films (British-French)
Harry Benham	Sherlock Holmes Solves The Sign of the Four	1913	Silent two-reel film (American)
James Bragington	A Study in Scarlet	1914	Silent film (British)
Francis Ford	A Study in Scarlet	1914	Silent film (American)
William Gillette	Sherlock Holmes	1916	Silent adaptation of the play (American)
Harry Arthur Saintsbury	The Valley of Fear	1916	Silent film (British)
Hugo Flink	Der Erdstrommotor	1917	Silent films (German)
Hugo Flink	Der Schlangenring	1917	Silent films (German)
Hugo Flink	Die Kassette	1917	Silent films (German)
Eille Norwood	45 short silent films	1921–1923	Stoll film series (British)
Eille Norwood	The Hound of the Baskervilles	1921	Stoll film series (British)
Eille Norwood	The Sign of the Four	1923	Stoll film series (British)
John Barrymore	Sherlock Holmes	1922	Silent adaptation of the play (American)
Carlyle Blackwell	Der Hund von Baskerville	1929	Silent film (German)
Clive Brook	The Return of Sherlock Holmes	1929	American film
Clive Brook	Paramount on Parade: "Murder Will Out"	1930	Anthology film sequence (American)
Clive Brook	Sherlock Holmes	1932	American film
Arthur Wontner	The Sleeping Cardinal	1931	1931–1937 film series (British)
Arthur Wontner	The Missing Rembrandt	1932	1931–1937 film series (British)
Arthur Wontner	The Sign of Four	1932	1931–1937 film series (British)
Arthur Wontner	The Triumph of Sherlock Holmes	1935	1931–1937 film series (British)
Arthur Wontner	Silver Blaze	1937	1931–1937 film series (British)
Raymond Massey	The Speckled Band	1931	British film
Robert Rendel	The Hound of the Baskervilles	1932	British film
Reginald Owen	A Study in Scarlet	1933	American film
Bruno Güttner	The Hound of the Baskervilles (Der Hund von Baskerville)	1937	German film
Hermann Speelmans	The Grey Lady (Die graue Dame)	1937	German film
Hans Albers	The Man Who Was Sherlock Holmes (Der Mann, der Sherlock Holmes war)	1937	German film
Basil Rathbone	The Hound of the Baskervilles	1939	1939–1946 film series (USA)
Basil Rathbone	The Adventures of Sherlock Holmes	1939	1939–1946 film series (USA)
Basil Rathbone	Sherlock Holmes and the Voice of Terror	1942	1939–1946 film series (USA)
Basil Rathbone	Sherlock Holmes and the Secret Weapon	1942	1939–1946 film series (USA)
Basil Rathbone	Sherlock Holmes in Washington	1943	1939–1946 film series (USA)
Basil Rathbone	Sherlock Holmes Faces Death	1943	1939–1946 film series (USA)
Basil Rathbone	Crazy House (short cameo)	1943	1939–1946 film series (USA)
Basil Rathbone	The Spider Woman	1944	1939–1946 film series (USA)
Basil Rathbone	The Scarlet Claw	1944	1939–1946 film series (USA)
Basil Rathbone	The Pearl of Death	1944	1939–1946 film series (USA)
Basil Rathbone	The House of Fear	1945	1939–1946 film series (USA)
Basil Rathbone	The Woman in Green	1945	1939–1946 film series (USA)
Basil Rathbone	Pursuit to Algiers	1945	1939–1946 film series (USA)
Basil Rathbone	Terror by Night	1946	1939–1946 film series (USA)
Basil Rathbone	Dressed to Kill	1946	1939–1946 film series (USA)
Basil Rathbone	The Great Mouse Detective	1986	Animated film (archive; voice only) (American)
Peter Cushing	The Hound of the Baskervilles	1959	British film
Christopher Lee	Sherlock Holmes and the Deadly Necklace	1962	West German-French-Italian film
John Neville	A Study in Terror	1965	British film
Peter Jeffrey	The Best House in London (short cameo)	1969	British film
Robert Stephens	The Private Life of Sherlock Holmes	1970	American film
George C. Scott	They Might Be Giants	1971	American film
Douglas Wilmer	The Adventure of Sherlock Holmes' Smarter Brother	1975	American film
Nicol Williamson	The Seven-Per-Cent Solution	1976	American film
Peter Cook	The Hound of the Baskervilles	1978	British film
Christopher Plummer	Murder by Decree	1979	British-Canadian film
Nicholas Rowe	Young Sherlock Holmes	1985	American film
Nicholas Rowe	Mr. Holmes	2015	British-American film (cameo in a film-within-the-film)
Michael Caine	Without a Clue	1988	British film
Juan Manuel Montesinos	Sherlock Holmes en Caracas	1992	Venezuelan film
Joaquim de Almeida	A Samba for Sherlock	2001	Brazilian-Portuguese film
Robert Downey Jr.	Sherlock Holmes	2009	American-British films
Robert Downey Jr.	Sherlock Holmes: A Game of Shadows	2011	American-British films
Gary Piquer	Holmes & Watson. Madrid Days	2012	Spanish film
Ian McKellen	Mr. Holmes	2015	American film
Yoshimitsu Takasugi	The Empire of Corpses	2015	Voice role; anime film (Japanese)
Chuck Huber	The Empire of Corpses	2016	Voice role; anime film (English dub)
Johnny Depp	Sherlock Gnomes	2018	Voice role; computer-animated film (American)
Naoki Tanaka	Kaitou Sentai Lupinranger VS Keisatsu Sentai Patranger en Film	2018	Japanese film
Will Ferrell	Holmes & Watson	2018	American film
Henry Cavill	Enola Holmes	2020	American-British film
Henry Cavill	Enola Holmes 2	2022	American-British film
Henry Cavill	Enola Holmes 3	2026	American-British film
Les Best	Sherlock Holmes: Mare of the Night	2025	American film
Les Best	Sherlock Holmes: The Fall of Watson	TBA	American film
Andrew Charles Stokes	Detective Chinatown 1900	2025	Chinese film
Dave Baumberger	Sherlock Holmes and the Angels of Vengeance	2025	American film
Ford Leland	Moriarty Rising: A Sherlock Holmes Tale	TBA	Italian production

== Video games ==
Name	Title	Date	Type
Peter Farley	Sherlock Holmes: Consulting Detective	1991	Consulting Detective series; live-action cutscenes
Peter Farley	Sherlock Holmes: Consulting Detective Vol. II	1992	Consulting Detective series; live-action cutscenes
Peter Farley	Sherlock Holmes: Consulting Detective Vol. III	1993	Consulting Detective series; live-action cutscenes
David Ian Davies	The Lost Files of Sherlock Holmes: The Case of the Serrated Scalpel	1992, 1994	Voice role (1992 release); live-action video clips (1994 release)
Jarion Monroe	The Lost Files of Sherlock Holmes: The Case of the Rose Tattoo	1996	Voice only; digitized sprites based on a different actor
George Gregg	The Lost Files of Sherlock Holmes: The Case of the Rose Tattoo	1996	Digitized-sprite actor
John Bell	Sherlock Holmes: The Mystery of the Mummy	2002	Sherlock Holmes series; voice role
Rick Simmonds	Sherlock Holmes: The Case of the Silver Earring	2004	Sherlock Holmes series; voice role
Rick Simmonds	Sherlock Holmes: The Awakened	2007	Sherlock Holmes series; voice role
Rick Simmonds	Sherlock Holmes Versus Arsène Lupin	2007	Sherlock Holmes series; voice role
Rick Simmonds	Sherlock Holmes Versus Jack the Ripper	2009	Sherlock Holmes series; voice role
Rick Simmonds	Sherlock Holmes and the Hound of the Baskervilles	2011	Sherlock Holmes series; voice role
Kerry Shale	The Testament of Sherlock Holmes	2012	Sherlock Holmes series; voice role
Kerry Shale	Sherlock Holmes: Crimes & Punishments	2014	Sherlock Holmes series; voice role
Alex Jordan	Sherlock Holmes: The Devil's Daughter	2016	Sherlock Holmes series; voice role
Alex Jordan	Sherlock Holmes Chapter One	2021	Sherlock Holmes series; voice role
Alex Jordan	Sherlock Holmes: The Awakened	2023	Sherlock Holmes series; voice role
Shinji Kawada	The Great Ace Attorney: Adventures	2015	The Great Ace Attorney series; voice role (Japanese)
Shinji Kawada	The Great Ace Attorney 2: Resolve	2017	The Great Ace Attorney series; voice role (Japanese)
Takahiro Mizushima	Fate/Grand Order (Limited event character)	2017	Mobile game; voice role (Japanese)
Robert Paterson	There Is No Game: Wrong Dimension	2020	Voice Role (English)
Robert Paterson	Crushed in Time	2026	Voice Role (English)
Bradley Clarkson	The Great Ace Attorney: Adventures	2021	The Great Ace Attorney series; voice role (English, as Herlock Sholmes)
Bradley Clarkson	The Great Ace Attorney 2: Resolve	2021	The Great Ace Attorney series; voice role (English, as Herlock Sholmes)
James Quinn	The Beekeeper's Picnic	2025	Point-and-click adventure game; voice role

== Actors who have played both Sherlock Holmes and Dr. Watson ==
A small number of actors have played both Holmes and Watson, including Reginald Owen who played Watson in Sherlock Holmes (1932) and Holmes in A Study in Scarlet (1933); Jeremy Brett, who played Watson on stage in the United States prior to adopting the mantle of Holmes on British television; Howard Marion-Crawford, who played Holmes on British radio and Watson on American television; Carleton Hobbs, who played both roles in British radio adaptations; Patrick Macnee, who played both roles in American television movies; and Anthony D.P. Mann who played Holmes in Sherlock Holmes and the Shadow Watchers (2011) and Watson in the 2017 Bleak December audio adaptation of The Hound of the Baskervilles.

== See also ==
- Adaptations of Sherlock Holmes
- List of actors who have played Dr. Watson
- List of actors who have played Inspector Lestrade
- List of actors who have played Irene Adler
- List of actors who have played Mycroft Holmes
- List of actors who have played Mrs. Hudson
- List of actors who have played Professor Moriarty
