= Muse Entertainment =

Canadian film and television production company

Muse Entertainment Enterprises
- Company type: Production company
- Industry: Film; Television
- Founded: May 1998; 28 years ago
- Founder: Michael Prupas
- Headquarters: Montreal, Quebec, Canada
- Number of locations: 4; Montreal; Los Angeles; Toronto; Vancouver
- Key people: Michael Prupas (Executive Chairman); Aren Prupas (President and CEO)
- Website: http://www.muse.ca/

Muse Entertainment, commonly referred to as Muse, is a Canadian film and television production company founded by Michael Prupas in 1998.

== Background ==
Muse's production arm, Muse Entertainment Enterprises, produces films and television series for a wide variety of audiences. Its distribution arm, Muse Distribution International, delivers films and television series to broadcasters, cable networks, streaming services, and other distributors globally.

Muse is one of the most active film and television production companies in the world for internationally co-produced projects.

Under Canada's official film production treaties, Muse has co-produced projects in many countries, including France, the United Kingdom, Ireland, Spain, Germany, Switzerland, Romania, Hungary, Morocco, Australia, and South Africa.

The company garnered attention in 2011 for its production of the multi-Emmy-winning and nominated miniseries The Kennedys, in association with Asylum Entertainment.

In 2026 the company signed a first-look deal with The Walrus, allowing the magazine's content to be considered for possible development into documentary film or television projects.

== Productions ==
=== Films ===
- Flood
- I'm Not There
- The Deal
- Blades of Glory
- The Fountain (2006)
- Niagara Motel
- The Guilty
- The Tracker
- Savage Messiah (2002)

=== Television films ===
- Rise of the Gargoyles
- Hellhounds
- Taking a Chance on Love
- Sand Serpents
- Carny
- High Plains Invaders
- Unstable
- Swamp Devil (2008)
- The Christmas Choir (2008)
- The Watch (2008)
- An Old Fashioned Thanksgiving
- Accidental Friendship
- Black Swarm
- Dr. Jekyll and Mr.Hyde (2008)
- Infected
- Girl's Best Friend
- I Me Wed
- Too Young To Marry
- The Wind in the Willows (2006)
- The House Sitter
- The House Next Door
- Tipping Point
- Proof of Lies
- Answered by Fire (2006)
- Recipe for a Perfect Christmas
- Black Widower
- Mind Over Murder
- Murder in the Hamptons
- Plain Truth (film) (2004)
- Icebound (2003)
- Silent Night (2002)
- Deadly Friends
- Infected (2008)
- Cyberbully (2011)
- Picking Up & Dropping Off
- The Many Trials of One Jane Doe (2002)
- The Clinic (2004)
- The Stork Derby (2002)
- The Investigation (2002)
- Chasing Cain: Face (2002)
- The Hound of the Baskervilles (2000)
- The Royal Scandal (2001)
- The Sign of Four (1984)
- The Case of the Whitechapel Vampire (2002)
- The Legend of Sleepy Hollow (1999)
- The Death and Life of Nancy Eaton (2003)
- Icebound (2003)
- Ricky Nelson: Original Teen Idol (1999)
- Class Warfare
- The Stalking of Laurie Show
- Daydream Believers: The Monkees' Story (2000)
- The Wool Cap (2004)

=== Television series ===
Title	Years	Network	Notes
The Mysteries of Alfred Hedgehog	2010	TVO, TFO, Knowledge Kids & Radio-Canada Television; France 5 (France)	co-production with Gaumont Alphanim, Prickly Entertainment, Europool and Jiang Toon Animation
The Pillars of the Earth	2010	The Movie Network	co-production with Tandem Communications and Scott Free Productions
Helen's Little School	2017	Knowledge Kids; France 5 (France)	co-production with Superprod Animation
The Truth About the Harry Quebert Affair	2018	Epix	co-production with MGM Television, Eagle Pictures, Barbary Films, Old Friends Productions and Repērage
Coroner	2019–2022	CBC	co-production with Cineflix Studios and Back Alley Film Productions
For Heaven's Sake	2021	CBC Gem; Paramount+ (United States)	co-production with CBS Studios and Funny or Die

- Bellevue (2017)
- Collision Course (2016–2017)
- Twice in a Lifetime (1999–2001)
- Bomb Girls
- Being Human
- Bounty Hunters
- Crusoe
- Durham County (2007–2010)
- Family Biz
- Gawayn
- Hubworld
- Largo Winch
- See Robin Jones
- Tales from the Neverending Story
- This Is Wonderland (2004–2006)
- Doc (2001–2004)
- The Tournament (2005–2006)

=== Miniseries ===
- The Kennedys: After Camelot (2017)
- 10.5: Apocalypse
- Answered by Fire
- Ben Hur
- Cat. 8
- Exploding Sun
- Flood
- Human Trafficking (2005)
- Impact (2009)
- Killer Wave
- The Kennedys
- The Last Templar
- The Pillars of the Earth
- The Phantom
- Tut
- University (2001)

=== Non-fiction ===
- For Heaven's Sake
- Human Nature
- March to the Top
- Rocksteady: The Roots of Reggae
- Rudy: The Rudy Giuliani Story (2003)
- Trump Unauthorized (2005)
- I'm Not There (2007)

== Awards and nominations ==
- This Is Wonderland

Won four Gemini Awards for actors Michael Murphy, Cara Pifko, and Michael Riley
Won WCC Award for Best Dramatic Series, George F. Walker, Dani Romain
Nominated for 38 Gemini Awards over three seasons
Nominated for three DGC Craft Awards
Nominated for Golden Nymph Award for best dramatic series at Monte Carlo Television Festival

- The Legend of Sleepy Hollow

Nominated for three Gemini Awards
Nominated for CSC Award for Best Cinematography

- The Wind in the Willows

Won Leo Award for Best Direction in Youth or Children's Program or Series, Rachel Talalay
Nominated for Satellite Award, Best Motion Picture Made for Television
Nominated for Gemini Award – Best Direction

- The Royal Scandal

Nominated for Gemini Award for Best Costume Design
Nominated for CSC Award for Best Cinematography

- The Case of the Whitechapel Vampire

Nominated for CSC Award and ASC Awards for Best Cinematography

- Twice in a Lifetime

Won Gold Plaque Special Achievement in Direction, David Winning at Chicago International Film Festival
Won Gold Plaque, Best Direction Variety/Entertainment, David Winning at Chicago International Film Festival
Won DGC Award for Outstanding Achievement in a Television Series for Drama
Nominated for five Gemini Awards, including Best Dramatic Television Series
Nominated for DGC Craft Award for Direction
Nominated for three Young Artist Awards

- Tales from the Neverending Story

Won Grand Prize for Best Program Award of Excellence 2003 from Alliance for Children and Television
Won Award of Excellence, Ages 9-12 Category from Alliance for Children and Television
Won Gemini Award for Best Costume Design
Nominated for four Gemini Awards
Nominated for Young Artist Award

- The Stork Derby

Nominated for Gemini Award for Best Supporting Actress for Pascale Montpetit
Nominated for two Golden Reel Awards

- The Many Trials of One Jane Doe

Won four Gemini Awards, including best actress Wendy Crewson, director Jerry Ciccoritti, screenwriter Karen Walton, and picture editor George Roulston
Won DGC Craft Award for Picture Editing
Nominated for five Gemini Awards, including Best TV Movie
Nominated for DGC Craft Award for Best Direction for Jerry Ciccoritti

- Chasing Cain: Face (2002)

Nominated for five Gemini Awards, including Best TV Movie

- Silent Night

Nominated for four Gemini Awards, including Best Direction, Rodney Gibbons

- The Hound of the Baskervilles

Nominated for Gemini Award for Best Costume Design

- The Royal Scandal

Nominated for Gemini Award for Best Costume Design
Nominated for CSC Award for Best Cinematography

- Savage Messiah

Won three Genie Awards, Best Actor for Luc Picard, Best Screenwriter for Sharon Riis and Best Supporting Actress Pascale Montpetit
Nominated for seven Genie Awards and one DGC Award nomination for Best Direction- for Mario Azzopardi

- Plain Truth

Won DGC Award for Sound Editing
Nominated for three DGC Awards

- Icebound

Nominated for Golden Reel Award

- The Death and Life of Nancy Eaton

Won Gemini Award for Best Actor for Brendan Fletcher
Nominated for two Gemini Awards
Nominated for CSC Award, Best Cinematography in TV Drama

- The Investigation

Won WGC Award for Writer for Bruce M. Smith
Nominated for two Gemini Awards

- Answered by Fire

Won Silver Hugo, Television Drama Miniseries, from Chicago International Television Awards
Won 2006 "Reflect d'Or" (Best Collection & Long Drama) at Geneva International Film Festival Tous Ecrans
Won 2006 SPAA Award for Television Drama, from Screen Producers Association of Australia
Won 2006 Silver Prize, for Teleseries, Series and Miniseries Category, from Australian Cinematographers Society for Mark Wareham
Won 2006 Best Director (Television Category) from Australian Film Institute for Jessica Hobbs
Won 2006 Best Actor (Television Category) from Australian Film Institute for David Wenham
Won 2006 Best Miniseries Script (Best Script Across all Genres) and Gold AWGIE from Australian Writers' Guild for Barbara Samuels and Katherine Thomson
Won Best Editing, Gemini Award for Dominique Fortin
Nominations for Gemini Awards

- Human Trafficking

Won three Gemini Awards, including Best Dramatic Miniseries
Won three DGC Awards, including Outstanding Direction for Christian Duguay
Nominated for three Emmy Awards
Nominated for two Golden Globes, Best Actor for Donald Sutherland and Best Actress for Mira Sorvino
Nominated for five Gemini Awards

- University (2001)

Won WGC Award for Writer Bruce M. Smith

- The Tournament (2005–2006)

Won Gemini Award for Best Editing
Nominated for five Gemini Awards, including Best Ensemble

- Doc (2001–2004)

Nominated for four Gemini Awards
Nominated for nine Young Artist Awards

- The Fountain

Won DGC Craft Award for Sound Editing
Won CFCA for Best Music Score
Nominated for Golden Globe for Best Original Score
Nominated for Golden Lion for Darren Aronofsky at Venice Film Festival
Nominated for two Satellite Awards

- Rudy: The Rudy Giuliani Story

Won two Golden Satellite Awards, including Best Motion Picture Made for Television
Nominated for two Emmy Awards, including Best Actor for James Woods

- The Wool Cap (2004)

Nominated for Golden Globe Best Actor for William H. Macy
Nominated for four Emmy Awards, including Outstanding Made for Television Movie
Nominated for Critics Choice Award for Best Picture Made for Television
Nominated for two Screen Actors Guild Awards
Nominated for WGA Award for TV, William H. Macy and Steven Schachter

- Trump Unauthorized

Nominated for Golden Reel for Best Sound Editing

- I'm Not There

Won Golden Globe Best Supporting Actress for Cate Blanchett
Won Robert Altman Award, Independent Spirit Awards
Won CFCA Award Best Supporting Actress for Cate Blanchett
Won Volpi Cup Best Actress for Cate Blanchett at Venice Film Festival
Won CinemAwenire Award Best Film at Venice Film Festival
Won Special Jury Prize for Todd Haynes at Venice Film Festival
Nominated for Oscar Best Supporting Actress for Cate Blanchett
Nominated for five Independent Spirit Awards
Nominated for Golden Lion for Todd Haynes at Venice Film Festival
Nominated for Critics Choice Award Best Supporting Actress for Cate Blanchett
Nominated for Satellite Award
Nominated for Screen Actors Guild Award

- Accidental Friendship

Nominated for Emmy Award in the category of Outstanding Lead Actress In A Miniseries Or A Movie for Chandra Wilson

- Swamp Devil

Won the Best Feature Film award at Burbank International Film Festival.
Won Best Director for David Winning
Nominated Best Original Score at Burbank International Film Festival for composer James Gelfand
Won 2009 Television Programming Awards Gold World Medal for Best Direction at the New York Festival
Won 2008 Best Foreign Feature film award at Big Island Film Festival
Won the Platinum award for Directing at Houston International Film Festival
Won 2008 The Audience Favorite award at Philadelphia Terror Film Festival
Won 2008 Best Supporting Actor award for Bruce Dern at Philadelphia Terror Film Festival

- Impact

Nominated for four Leo Awards, including: Best Cinematography, Best Sound Editing, Best Musical Score, and Best Visual Effects

- The Christmas Choir

Won 2008 America's Epiphany Prize for the most inspiring television movie or mini series

- Durham County

Won five Gemini Awards, two DGC Awards, and the CFTPA Indie Award for Best Series
