= The Sign of Four (disambiguation) =

The Sign of Four may refer to:

- The Sign of the Four, a novel by Sir Arthur Conan Doyle featuring the fictional detective Sherlock Holmes
- The Sign of Four (1923 film), a silent film based on the novel, directed by Maurice Elvey
- The Sign of Four (1932 film), a film based on the novel, directed by Graham Cutts
- The Sign of Four (1983 film), one of a series of films based on the Sherlock Holmes novels made in the 1980s, starring Ian Richardson
- The Sign of Four, one of a series of television programs collectively titled Sherlock Holmes, based on the Holmes stories, starring Jeremy Brett
- The Sign of the Four (2001 film), a Hallmark Channel adaptation, starring Matt Frewer as Holmes
- The Sign of 4 (album), a collaborative free jazz album between guitarists Pat Metheny and Derek Bailey, and percussionists Gregg Bendian and Paul Wertico.
