= Tenderfoot (film) =

1988 Canadian short film

- French: Le Pied tendre
- Directed by: Roger Boire
- Written by: Roger Boire
- Produced by: Viateur Castonguay; Roger Boire
- Starring: Massimo Agostinelli; Mario Bertrand; Andréa Davidson
- Cinematography: Serge Ladouceur
- Edited by: François Valcour
- Music by: Jacques Blais; Bertrand Cormier; Michel Dupire
- Production companies: Les Films Tango; L'Oeil Fou
- Release date: 1988
- Running time: 14 minutes
- Country: Canada

Tenderfoot (French: Le Pied tendre) is a Canadian short dramatic dance film, directed by Roger Boire and released in 1988. The film stars Massimo Agostinelli as a window washer cleaning the windows at a dance school, who becomes fascinated by the dancers and begins to imagine himself participating in dance routines with them; eventually he is drawn in for real, when his bucket is stolen and he has to participate in a dance to recover it.

The film received a Genie Award nomination for Best Live Action Short Drama at the 10th Genie Awards in 1989.
