= Serge Ladouceur =

Canadian cinematographer

Serge Ladouceur (born June 16, 1952) is a Canadian film and television cinematographer and director from Quebec, best known for his work on the television series Supernatural.

He has also had occasional credits as a director and producer, including some episodes of Supernatural and the television film Behind & Above: The Wings of Fire (Les ailes du feu).

== Filmography ==
- A 20th Century Chocolate Cake - 1983
- Pale Face (Visage pâle) - 1985
- Rock et Belles Oreilles - 1987-1988
- Les enfants de la rue: Fernand - 1997
- Tenderfoot (Le pied tendre) - 1988
- Paroles d'échanges - 1991
- Montréal ville ouverte - 1992
- La misère des riches - 1992
- Maria des Eaux-Vives - 1993
- Les grands procès - 1993-1995, 16 episodes
- A Gift of Munsch - 1994
- Behind & Above: The Wings of Fire (Les ailes du feu) - 1995
- Night of the Flood (La nuit du déluge) - 1996
- Zie 37 Stagen - 1997
- Madame le consul - 1997
- More Tales of the City - 1998, six episodes
- Out of Mind: The Stories of H.P. Lovecraft - 1998
- Nothing to Declare - 1999
- Pin-Pon, le film - 1999
- Bonanno: A Godfather's Story - 1999
- L'Idée noire - 2000
- Further Tales of the City - 2001
- The Royal Scandal - 2001
- Snow in August - 2001
- Savage Messiah (Moïse, l'affaire Roch Thériault) - 2002
- The Case of the Whitechapel Vampire - 2002
- The Stork Derby - 2002
- Student Seduction - 2003
- See Jane Date - 2003
- The Favourite Game - 2003
- Mambo Italiano - 2003
- Rudy: The Rudy Giuliani Story - 2003
- Picking Up and Dropping Off - 2003
- Moving Sands - 2003
- I Do (But I Don't) - 2004
- Supernatural - 2005-2020, 319 episodes
- René Lévesque - 2006
- Bon Voyage - 2006
- The Spencer Sisters - 2023, 10 episodes

== Awards ==
Award	Ceremony	Category	Work	Result	Ref(s)
American Society of Cinematographers	2003	Outstanding Achievement in Cinematography in Motion Picture, Limited Series, or Pilot Made for Television	The Case of the Whitechapel Vampire	Nominated	
Canadian Society of Cinematographers	1997	Best Cinematography in a Theatrical Feature	Night of the Flood (La nuit du déluge)	Won	
Canadian Society of Cinematographers	2000	Best Cinematography in TV Drama	Bonanno: A Godfather's Story	Nominated	
Canadian Society of Cinematographers	2000	Best Cinematography in TV Drama	The Legend of Sleepy Hollow	Nominated	
Canadian Society of Cinematographers	2002	Best Cinematography in TV Drama	The Royal Scandal	Nominated	
Canadian Society of Cinematographers	2003	Best Cinematography in TV Drama	The Case of the Whitechapel Vampire	Nominated	
Canadian Society of Cinematographers	2004	Best Cinematography in a Theatrical Feature	The Favourite Game	Nominated	
Gémeaux Awards	1989	Best Cinematography - Variety, Performing Arts or Comedy	Rock et Belles Oreilles	Won	
Gémeaux Awards	1992	Best Cinematography - Video	Montréal ville ouverte	Nominated	
Gémeaux Awards	1994	Best Cinematography - Film	La femme Pitre	Nominated	
Gémeaux Awards	1994	Best Cinematography - Film	Fred Rose	Nominated	
Gémeaux Awards	1996	Best Cinematography - Film	L'Affaire Cordélia Viau	Nominated	
Gémeaux Awards	1996	Best Performing Arts Special	Behind & Above: The Wings of Fire (Les ailes du feu) with Sylvie Bourque, René Chénier	Nominated	
Gemini Awards	1997	Best Performing Arts Program or Series, or Arts Documentary Program	Behind & Above: The Wings of Fire with René Chénier	Won	
Genie Awards	1997	Best Cinematography	Night of the Flood (La nuit du déluge)	Nominated	
Genie Awards	2003	Best Cinematography	Savage Messiah (Moïse, l'affaire Roch Thériault)	Nominated	
Yorkton Film Festival	1997	Best Cinematography	Zie 37 Stagen	Won	
