= For Heaven's Sake (TV series) =

Canadian documentary television series

- Created by: Mike Mildon; Jackson Rowe
- Directed by: Tim Johnson
- Composer: Darien Shulman
- Country of origin: Canada
- Original language: English
- No. of seasons: 1
- No. of episodes: 8

Production
- Executive producers: Courtney Dobbins; Mike Mildon; Jonas Prupas; Fiona Isaacson; Joe Farrell; Jackson Rowe; Tony Yacenda
- Producer: Dean Perlmutter
- Running time: 31 minutes
- Production companies: CBS Studios; Muse Entertainment; Funny or Die

Original release
- Network: CBC Gem
- Release: March 4, 2021

For Heaven's Sake is a Canadian documentary television series, which premiered in 2021 on CBC Gem in Canada and Paramount+ in the United States. Created by Mike Mildon and Jackson Rowe, the series follows their attempts to solve the mystery of the 1934 disappearance of Harold Heaven, Mildon's great-great uncle, from his cabin in Minden, Ontario, even though their backgrounds are more in comedy than in detective work.

The series was produced by Muse Entertainment, in conjunction with Funny or Die and CBS Television Studios.

The series received three Canadian Screen Award nominations at the 10th Canadian Screen Awards in 2022, for Best Factual Program or Series, Best Sound in a Non-Fiction Program or Series (Eric Apps) and Best Writing in a Factual Program or Series (Mildon, Rowe, Jay Cheel).
