= Savage Messiah (2002 film) =

2002 Canadian film

- DVD cover
- French: Moïse, l’affaire Roch Thériault
- Directed by: Mario Azzopardi
- Written by: Sharon Riis
- Produced by: Bernard Zukerman; Michael Prupas
- Starring: Polly Walker; Luc Picard; Isabelle Blais; Louis Ferreira; Pascale Montpetit; Julie La Rochelle
- Cinematography: Serge Ladouceur
- Edited by: Mike Lee
- Music by: Frank Ilfman
- Production companies: Astral Films; Bernard Zukerman Productions
- Distributed by: Christal Films
- Release date: April 26, 2002
- Running time: 94 minutes
- Country: Canada
- Box office: $854,613

Savage Messiah (French: Moïse, l’affaire Roch Thériault) is a Canadian thriller-drama film, released in 2002. The film dramatizes the real-life story of Roch "Moïse" Thériault, a cult leader who was arrested in Burnt River, Ontario, in 1989.

The film stars Luc Picard as Thériault and Polly Walker as Paula Jackson, the social worker whose investigation revealed Thériault's crimes.

== Synopsis ==
Inspired by real-life events, Roch Thériault (Luc Picard), the head of a strange commune, lives with 2 men, his 10 wives, and his 23 children. While visiting Burnt River, Ontario, a social worker (Polly Walker) suspects that the women of Thériault's commune are being abused. Despite the indifference of her co-workers, she undertakes an investigation that leads to terrible discoveries; a dead child, bizarre rituals, and serious cases of physical and psychological torture. In doing so, she puts her career and her life on the line. However, she is ready to overcome all obstacles to free the members of the community from Thériault's grip. She must also confront Thériault, who manipulates people and the system with astonishing ease, including court-appointed investigators.
