= Matt Frewer =

Canadian-American actor (born 1958)

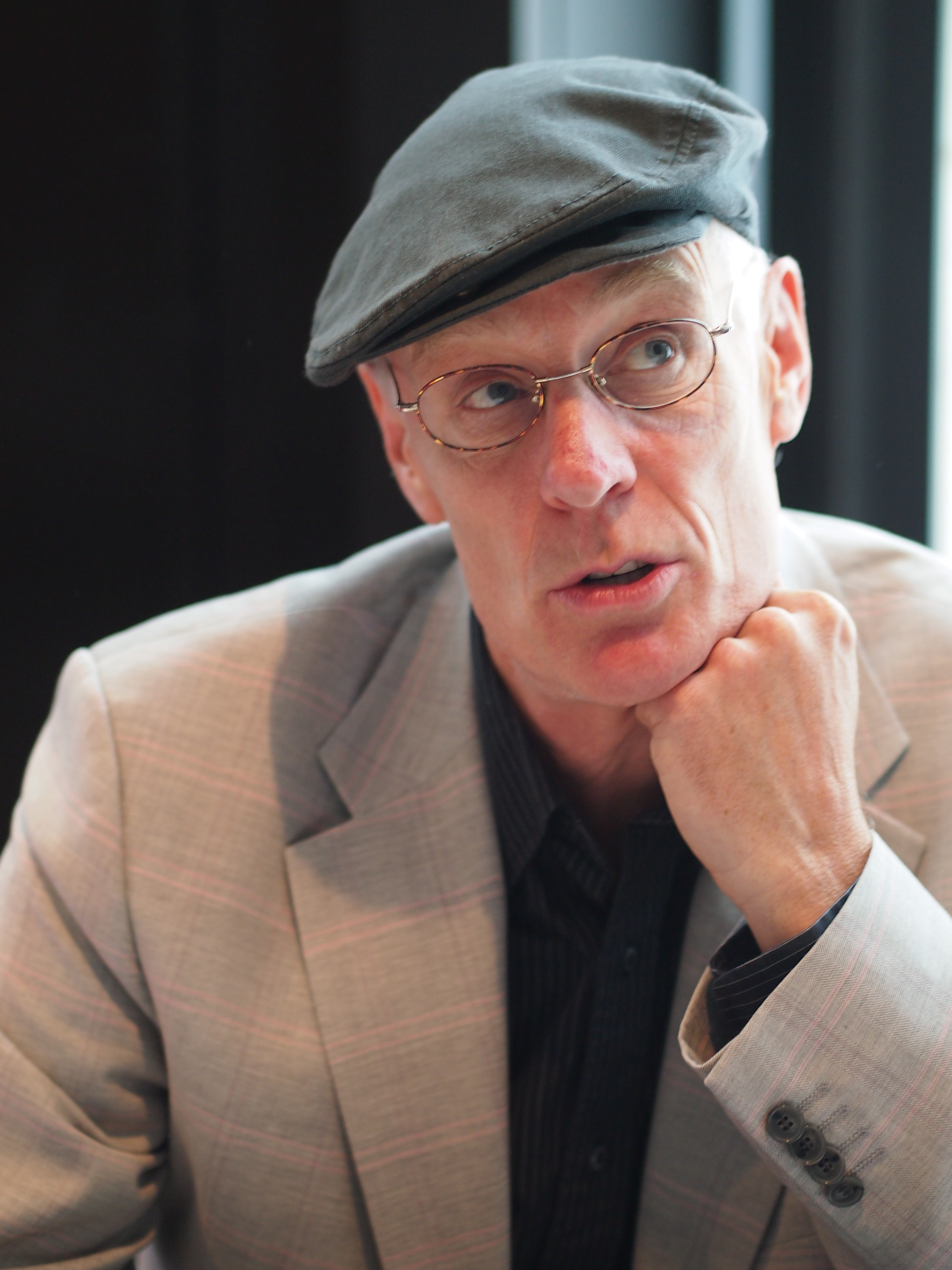
- Frewer at the 2013 FedCon
- Born: Matthew George Frewer; January 4, 1958 (age 68); Washington, D.C., U.S.
- Citizenship: Canada; United States
- Education: Bristol Old Vic Theatre School (1980)
- Occupations: Actor; comedian
- Years active: 1983–present
- Spouse: Amanda Hillwood (m. 1984)
- Children: 1

Matthew George Frewer (born January 4, 1958) is an American-Canadian actor and comedian. He portrayed the 1980s icon Max Headroom in the 1985 TV film and 1987 television series of the same name.

He became prominent when playing roles in films, like Russell Thompson Sr. in Honey, I Shrunk the Kids (1989), Jobe Smith in Lawnmower Man 2: Beyond Cyberspace (1996), Sherlock Holmes in a 2001 film adaptation of The Sign of Four, Frank in Dawn of the Dead (2004), Moloch in Watchmen (2009), Mitch in 50/50 (2011), and Archibald Stanley in Night at the Museum: Secret of the Tomb (2014).

His television credits include Dr. Mike Stratford in Doctor Doctor (1989–1991), Bob in Shaky Ground (1992–1993), Trashcan Man in The Stand (1994), Matt Prager in Psi Factor: Chronicles of the Paranormal (1997–1999), Dr. Jim Taggart in Eureka (2006–2012) and Doctor Leekie in the Canadian science fiction drama Orphan Black (2013–2017).

Frewer's more recent performances include a portrayal of "General #2" in the Steven Spielberg picture The BFG (2016), the character Carnage in the Netflix series Altered Carbon in 2018 and Logan in Fear the Walking Dead (2019). Also, he portrayed The Binder in three episodes of The Magicians and Peter Morton in eight episodes of The Order (2019−2020).

His voice roles include Panic in Hercules and its 1998 television series, Inspector 47 in The Magic School Bus, the Pink Panther in the 1993 television series of the same name, Lloyd Christmas in the Dumb and Dumber animated series, Jackal in Gargoyles and Dedgar Deadman in Toonsylvania.

== Early life ==
Frewer was born in Washington, D.C., to Canadian parents, one of five children born to Gillian Anne (née German) and Captain Frederick Charlesley Frewer, a Royal Canadian Navy officer. He was raised in Peterborough, Ontario, where he graduated from Lakefield College School. He went on to train at the Bristol Old Vic Theatre School, graduating from its three-year acting course in 1980.

== Career ==
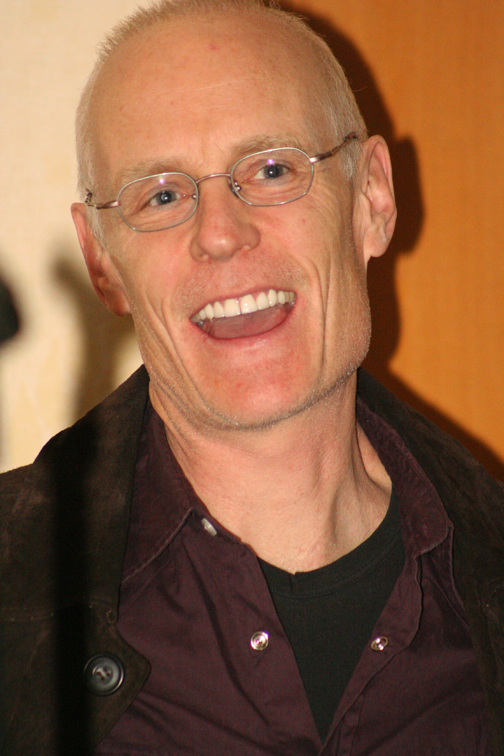
Frewer in 2007

Frewer portrayed the artificial intelligence character Max Headroom in the 1980s, starring in the 1985 eponymous science fiction television film; Frewer also played award-winning Network 23 journalist Edison Carter in the film. This led to a series on the UK Channel 4 network with the Max Headroom character as a video jockey and interviewer. This ran for two seasons, the second of which featured a studio audience with whom Max interacted. In 1987, an American series based upon the 1985 film aired, titled Max Headroom (1987–1988). From 1993 to 1995, Frewer voiced the Pink Panther for the television series. Frewer guest-starred in the fifth-season Star Trek: The Next Generation episode "A Matter of Time". He also portrayed Max Headroom in other media, including a series of television commercials for "New Coke" and "Radio Rentals", as well as the single and music video for "Paranoimia" by Art of Noise. He reprised this role in the science fiction comedy film Pixels (2015).

Frewer starred as Mike Stratford in Doctor Doctor (1989–1991). He also appeared as Trashcan Man in the television miniseries The Stand. Frewer has also appeared in such films as The Fourth Protocol (1987), Honey, I Shrunk the Kids (1989), National Lampoon's Senior Trip (1995), and the 2004 remake of Dawn of the Dead.

Frewer was nominated for two Gemini Awards in 2000, one for a guest appearance on Da Vinci's Inquest and another for his work on the series Mentors. He was a regular on Eureka during the series' first two seasons, playing Jim Taggart. He has done voice-over work on several animated projects, including Batman: The Animated Series (1993) and The Incredible Hulk (1996–1997). Frewer portrayed Matt Praeger in Psi Factor: Chronicles of the Paranormal from 1997 to 2000.

In 2009, Frewer portrayed the retired villain Moloch the Mystic in Watchmen and appeared as the White Knight in the December 2009 Syfy two-part miniseries Alice, based upon Alice's Adventures in Wonderland. He starred as Pestilence in two episodes of Season 5 of Supernatural. He has appeared in several adaptations of Stephen King stories, such as The Stand. Quicksilver Highway, Riding the Bullet, Desperation and Bag of Bones.

He played Dr. Aldous Leekie in the first two seasons of Orphan Black.

In 2018, Frewer portrayed Carnage in the Netflix series Altered Carbon. In the same year, Frewer was cast in the Netflix horror-drama series The Order.

== Personal life ==
Frewer has been married to Amanda Hillwood since 1984 and the couple have a daughter. In 1989, they bought a house in Marina del Rey, California.

== Filmography ==
=== Film ===
| Year | Title | Role | Notes |
|---|---|---|---|
| 1983 | The Lords of Discipline | Senior | |
| 1983 | The Crimson Permanent Assurance | Very Big Corporation of America Yuppie | Short film Segment: Monty Python's The Meaning of Life |
| 1984 | Supergirl | Eddie the Truck Driver | |
| 1985 | Spies Like Us | Soldier #2 | |
| 1987 | The Fourth Protocol | Tom McWhirter | |
| 1987 | Ishtar | CIA Agent #3 | |
| 1989 | Speed Zone | Alec Stewart | |
| 1989 | Honey, I Shrunk the Kids | Russell 'Russ' Thompson, Sr. | |
| 1989 | Far from Home | Charlie Cox | |
| 1990 | Short Time | Ernie Dills | |
| 1991 | The Taking of Beverly Hills | Ed Kelvin | |
| 1993 | Twenty Bucks | Receding Bingo Winner | |
| 1995 | Return to Two Moon Junction | Cleo, Leo | Uncredited |
| 1995 | Driving Mr. Pink | The Pink Panther (voice) | Short film |
| 1995 | National Lampoon's Senior Trip | Principal Todd Moss | |
| 1995 | BugHunt | Edward Schulze (voice) | |
| 1996 | Lawnmower Man 2: Beyond Cyberspace | Jobe Smith | |
| 1997 | Hercules | Panic (voice) | |
| 1998 | Heartwood | Frank Burris (voice) | Uncredited |
| 1999 | 6ix | Satan, Nathan, Lucy, Mother, Father | Short film |
| 1999 | Hercules: Zero to Hero | Panic (voice) | Direct-to-video |
| 2000 | Cyberworld | Frazzled (voice) | Short film |
| 2004 | Dawn of the Dead | Frank | |
| 2004 | A Home at the End of the World | Ned Glover | |
| 2004 | Going the Distance | Farmer Joseph | |
| 2004 | Intern Academy | Dr. Anton Keller | |
| 2004 | Geraldine's Fortune | Cameron Geary | |
| 2004 | Riding the Bullet | Mr. Clarkson | |
| 2007 | Weirdsville | Jason Taylor | |
| 2009 | Watchmen | Moloch | |
| 2009 | Rampage | Mr. Williamson | |
| 2009 | Darfur | Ted Duncan | |
| 2010 | Frankie and Alice | Dr. Strassfield | |
| 2011 | Wushu Warrior | Lord Edward Lindsey | |
| 2011 | 50/50 | Mitch | |
| 2011 | Foreverland | Mr. Steadman | |
| 2014 | Rampage: Capital Punishment | Mr. Williamson (voice) | Uncredited |
| 2014 | Night at the Museum: Secret of the Tomb | Archibald Stanley | Cameo |
| 2015 | Pixels | Max Headroom (voice) | |
| 2016 | The BFG | General #2 | |
| 2017 | Residue | Mr. Fairweather | |
| TBA | Casket Girls | TBA | Post-production |

=== Television ===
| Year | Title | Role | Notes |
|---|---|---|---|
| 1984 | The First Olympics: Athens 1896 | Francis Lane | Television miniseries |
| 1985 | Max Headroom: 20 Minutes Into The Future | Max Headroom, Edison Carter | Television film |
| 1986 | Robin of Sherwood | Roger de Carnac | Episode "The Betrayal" |
| 1987 | St. Elsewhere | Pee-Wee, Walter Sandler | Episode: "No Chemo, Sabe?" |
| 1987–1988 | Max Headroom | Max Headroom, Edison Carter | 14 episodes |
| 1988 | Miami Vice | Cliff King | Episodes: "Hostile Takeover" and "Redemption in Blood" |
| 1988 | Sesame Street | Max Headroom | 2 episodes |
| 1989–1991 | Doctor Doctor | Dr. Mike Stratford | Lead role, 40 episodes |
| 1991 | Star Trek: The Next Generation | Berlinghoff Rasmussen | Episode: "A Matter of Time" |
| 1992 | Tiny Toon Adventures | Mac Duff (voice) | 2 episodes |
| 1992 | Eerie, Indiana | Howard Paymer | Episode: "Tornado Days" |
| 1992–1993 | Shaky Ground | Bob Moody | 17 episodes |
| 1993 | Batman: The Animated Series | Sid the Squid / Sidney Debris (voice) | Episode: "The Man Who Killed Batman" |
| 1993 | Bonkers | Peter Blaine (voice) | Episode: "Trains, Toons, and Toon Trains" |
| 1993 | The Day My Parents Ran Away | Bob Miller | Television film |
| 1993–1995 | The Pink Panther | The Pink Panther (voice) | Main role |
| 1994 | In Search of Dr. Seuss | The Cat in the Hat | Television film |
| 1994 | American Playhouse | Ambassador Edwin Reischauer | Episode: "Long Shadows" |
| 1994 | The Stand | Trashcan Man | Miniseries, 4 episodes |
| 1994 | Aladdin | Chaos (voice) | Episode: "When Chaos Comes Calling" |
| 1994–1996 | Gargoyles | Jackal (voice) | 7 episodes |
| 1994–1996 | Itsy Bitsy Spider | The Exterminator (voice) | 26 episodes |
| 1995 | Captain Planet and the Planeteers | Adolf Hitler (voice) | Episode: "A Good Bomb Is Hard to Find" |
| 1995–1996 | Dumb and Dumber | Lloyd Christmas (voice) | 13 episodes |
| 1996 | Generation X | Russel Tresh | Television film |
| 1996 | Iron Man | Episode: "Hulk Buster" | |
| 1996 | Bruno the Kid | Bobby Vicious (voice) | Episode: "Searching for Bobby Vicious" |
| 1996 | Quack Pack | Additional voices | Episode: "Tasty Paste" |
| 1996 | Mighty Ducks: The Animated Series | Dr. Wally Pretorius (voice) | Episode: "The Human Factor" |
| 1996 | The Outer Limits | Norman Glass | Episode: "First Anniversary" |
| 1996 | Apollo 11 | Gene Kranz | Television film |
| 1996 | The Magic School Bus | Inspector 47 (voice) | Episode: "In the Rainforest" |
| 1996 | Late Night with Conan O'Brien | Himself | 1 episode |
| 1996–1997 | The Incredible Hulk | The Leader (voice) | 10 episodes |
| 1997 | Quicksilver Highway | Dr. Charles "Charlie" George | Television film |
| 1997 | Dead Man's Gun | Norbert Datry | Episode: "Fool's Gold - Pilot #2" |
| 1997 | Tracey Takes On... | Bob | Episode: "Supernatural" |
| 1997 | Desert's Edge | Greg | Television film |
| 1997 | Dead Fire | Max Durbin | Television film |
| 1997 | Breast Men | Gerald Krzemien | Television film |
| 1997–1999 | Psi Factor: Chronicles of the Paranormal | Matt Praeger | 49 episodes |
| 1998 | Toonsylvania | Dedgar Deadman (voice) | 14 episodes |
| 1998–1999 | Hercules | Panic (voice) | 24 episodes |
| 1999 | Mentors | Frederick Banting | Episode: "A Transient, Shining Trouble" |
| 1999 | Mickey Mouse Works | Toymaker (voice) | Episode: "#1.4" |
| 2000 | Da Vinci's Inquest | Larry Williams | 2 episodes |
| 2000 | Jailbait | Al Fisher | Television film |
| 2000 | The Hound of the Baskervilles | Sherlock Holmes | Television film |
| 2001–2002 | House of Mouse | Panic, Toymaker (voice) | 6 episodes |
| 2001 | The Sign of Four | Sherlock Holmes | Television film |
| 2001 | The Royal Scandal | Sherlock Holmes | Television film |
| 2002 | The Case of the Whitechapel Vampire | Sherlock Holmes | Television film |
| 2002 | Taken | Dr. Chet Wakeman | 6 episodes Television miniseries |
| 2004 | The Eleventh Hour | Dr. Lansing | Episode: "Wonderland" |
| 2005 | Masters of Horror | Wally | Episode: "Chocolate" |
| 2006 | Desperation | Ralph Carver | Television film |
| 2006–2007 | Intelligence | Ted Altman | 26 episodes |
| 2006–2012 | Eureka | Dr. Jim Taggart | 18 episodes |
| 2009 | Alice | White Knight | Television miniseries |
| 2010 | Battle of the Bulbs | Stu Jones | Television film |
| 2010 | How I Met Your Mother | Carriage Driver | Uncredited; Episode: "Of Course" |
| 2010 | Supernatural | Pestilence, Dr. Green | 2 episodes |
| 2011 | Bag of Bones | Sid Noonan | Television miniseries |
| 2012–2013 | Falling Skies | General Bressler | 7 episodes |
| 2012 | Delete | Arthur Bowden | Television miniseries |
| 2013–2017 | Orphan Black | Dr. Aldous Leekie | 11 episodes |
| 2013 | Witches of East End | Vidar | 2 episodes |
| 2014 | The Knick | Dr. J.M. Christiansen | 5 episodes |
| 2014–2015 | The Librarians | Dulaque, Lancelot | 5 episodes |
| 2015 | Olympus | Daedalus, Prometheus | 12 episodes |
| 2016 | The Art of More | Paul Rice | 6 episodes |
| 2016 | 12 Monkeys | Dr. Kirschner | Episode: "Fatherland" |
| 2016 | Love in Paradise | Dr. Frank | Television film |
| 2016–2017 | Timeless | Anthony Bruhl | 5 episodes |
| 2017–2018 | Castlevania | The Bishop (voice) | 4 episodes |
| 2018 | Altered Carbon | Carnage | 3 episodes |
| 2018 | The Truth About the Harry Quebert Affair | Reverend Kellergan | Miniseries, 10 episodes |
| 2019 | The Order | Peter Morton | 7 episodes |
| 2019 | Fear the Walking Dead | Logan | 6 episodes |
| 2019–2020 | The Magicians | The Binder | 3 episodes |
| 2020 | Perry Mason | Judge Fred Wright | 3 episodes |
| 2025 | The Hunting Party | Dr. Henry Dulles | 4 episodes |

=== Video games ===
| Year | Title | Role | Notes |
|---|---|---|---|
| 1997 | Hercules | Panic | |
| 1997 | Disney's Animated Storybook: Hercules | Panic | |
| 1998 | Disney's Hades Challenge | Panic | |
| 2012 | Sorcerers of the Magic Kingdom | Panic | |

== Radio ==
- Tales from the Mausoleum Club: Episode 2, "Heart of Skegness"

== Awards and nominations ==
| Year | Award | Category | Film/TV Show | Result | Ref. |
|---|---|---|---|---|---|
| 1987 | CableACE Award | Best Music Host | The Max Headroom Show | Won | |
| 2000 | Gemini Award | Best Performance in a Children's or Youth Program or Series | Mentors | Won | |
| 2000 | Gemini Award | Best Performance in a Children's or Youth Program or Series | Da Vinci's Inquest | Nominated | |
| 2010 | Leo Award | Best Lead Performance by a Male in a Feature Length Drama | Alice | Nominated | |
| 2011 | Leo Award | Best Guest Performance by a Male in a Dramatic Series | Supernatural episode: "Two Minutes To Midnight" | Nominated | |
| 2014 | Leo Award | Best Guest Performance by a Male in a Dramatic Series | Orphan Black episode: "Unconscious Selection" | Nominated | |
| 2019 | Leo Award | Best Supporting Performance by a Male in a Dramatic Series | The Order episode: "Finals: Part 1" | Nominated | |
