= The Hound of the Baskervilles (2000 film) =

2000 film directed by Rodney Gibbons

- Based on: The Hound of the Baskervilles by Arthur Conan Doyle
- Screenplay by: Joe Wiesenfeld
- Directed by: Rodney Gibbons
- Starring: Matt Frewer; Kenneth Welsh
- Music by: Marc Ouellette
- Country of origin: Canada
- Original language: English

Production
- Producer: Irene Litinsky
- Cinematography: Eric Cayla
- Editor: Vidal Béïque
- Running time: 90 minutes
- Production company: Muse Entertainment
- Budget: $4.5 million

Original release
- Network: CTV
- Release: 2000

Related
- The Sign of Four

The Hound of the Baskervilles is a Canadian television film directed by Rodney Gibbons and starring Matt Frewer and Kenneth Welsh. The film is based on Arthur Conan Doyle's 1902 Sherlock Holmes novel of the same name.

== Production ==
The first of four Holmes adaptations starring Frewer as Holmes, The Hound of the Baskervilles was followed by The Sign of Four in 2001, then The Royal Scandal (a blend of "A Scandal in Bohemia" and "The Bruce-Partington Plans") in 2001, with The Case of the Whitechapel Vampire (an original story) the final film released in 2002. Because of the duo's compatibility, they were asked to stay on for a sequel to the film. At the time of release, this was the sixth adaptation of Conan Doyle's 'Hound of the Baskervilles' story.

The film was produced by Montréal-based production company Muse Entertainment and, although both Frewer and Welsh had not read the original story, that did not deter the producers from hiring them on. The two actors were cast for the roles because of their previous theatre training experience. The film's budget was a generous $4.5 million, making it a step above most TV films. Most of the film's budget went into creating elaborate sets to capture the essence of the book's locations. Production designer Jean-Baptiste Tard had $600,000 to create 221B Baker Street as well as a facade for Baskerville Hall. The film was shot in Quebec, Canada, using the streets of Old Montreal to mimic Holmes' iconic Baker Street residence, and the streets of London, England. The nearby rural town of Harrington, Quebec was used as a stand in for the English moors near Henry Baskerville's home. The "hound" was a trained German Shepherd augmented with the use of contact lenses and CG.

== Cast ==
- Matt Frewer as Sherlock Holmes
- Kenneth Welsh as Dr. John H. Watson
- Jason London as Sir Henry Baskerville
- Emma Campbell as Beryl Stapleton
- Gordon Masten as Dr. Mortimer
- Robin Wilcock as Stapleton

== Reception ==
Frewer's portrayal of Holmes was largely criticized. He has been described as an actor that is 'normally eccentric and rubber-faced', allowing critics to call his adaptation the 'Ace Ventura version of Sherlock Holmes'. Frewer's "manic quirks owe more to Jim Carrey than Basil Rathbone" said one critic. Going on, the actor's characterization has been called more gay, this stemming from what the critic called Holmes' "subliminal interest in the young and handsome Sir Henry Baskerville".

In order to make his interpretation of Holmes stand out, Frewer decided to tap deeper into Holmes' genius side. In an interview with The Globe and Mail, Frewer commented on his take of the infamous sleuth, saying, "I decided Holmes has these literal brainstorms. He can hardly keep up with his own ideas. His brain is working quickly but he's always got this calm reserve and demeanour. So that's exactly how I decided to play him."
