= The Beekeeper's Picnic =

2025 adventure video game

- Cover art by Jabbage
- Developer: Afoot Games
- Publisher: Afoot Games
- Programmer: Helen Greetham
- Artist: Helen Greetham
- Writer: Helen Greetham
- Composer: Sandy Garnelle
- Platform: Linux; Microsoft Windows
- Release: 26 March, 2025
- Genre: Adventure
- Mode: Single-player

The Beekeeper's Picnic - A Sherlockian Adventure is an indie point-and-click adventure game created by Helen "Jabbage" Greetham, and based on the Sherlock Holmes stories by Arthur Conan Doyle.

== Plot ==
The setting is the fictional Sussex village of Fulworth in the 1920s. Holmes has retired from detection to become a beekeeper. As Dr. Watson arrives to recuperate from his wartime service, Holmes decides to set up a surprise picnic for his old friend. However, his plans are interrupted by a series of mysteries occurring throughout the village.

== Voice cast ==
- James Quinn as Sherlock Holmes
- Andrew James Spooner as Dr John Watson
- Richard Rycroft as Mycroft Holmes
- Alice Osmanski as Tilda
- Suzie Rai as Sanjay Kumar
- Felix Trench as Ruffles the Clown
- Layla Katib as 'Professor' Pippi Ricci
- Ellie Dickinson as Martha
- Shamini Bundell as Mrs Kumar
- Beth Eyre as Rose the Flower Seller
- Alison Skilbeck as Mrs Whitlock
- Peter Wicks as Harold Stackhurst
- Tobias Weatherburn as Toby III
- Shogo Miyakita as PC Webber
- Amy Rockson as Violet Hunter
- Pip Gladwin as Jerome
- Giancarlo Herrera as 'Killer' Evans

== Gameplay ==
The puzzles have multiple solutions and outcomes. The runtime is around four to six hours.

== Reception ==
Kotaku critic John Walker called the game "...an uplifting, gentle tale, packed with superbly informed references to Arthur Conan Doyle’s fiction, delivered with a bucolic charm." Walker praised the design, storytelling, voice acting, themes and faithfulness to the source material, and expressed satisfaction at how the puzzles and mysteries interwove in regards to the characters' stories.

The Collegian's Fred Nguyen cited the game as "..a love letter to the Sherlock Holmes stories that have delighted readers for well over a century."

Indie Hive's Rachael Brearton stated "The different characters are all interesting and have their own personalities and backstories that serve to enhance the storytelling experience. The overall narrative is rather heartfelt and endearing, offering some contrast to the original Sherlock Holmes adventures whilst also paying a loving homage to those stories and their author, Sir Arthur Conan Doyle." Additionally, Brearton complimented the game's relaxing pace, detailed visual design, pleasant soundtrack, concluding that "The Beekeeper’s Picnic is a wonderful experience that will provide 4-6 hours of gameplay at a very reasonable price. Its point-and-click gameplay is a lot of fun, with satisfying puzzles that have a good level of variety. There is some thought involved, but the level of challenge is moderate; it is not so difficult that it becomes frustrating. The narrative, a sincere and endearing sequence of capers featuring two well-known and loved characters, is engrossing and emotive. I had a lot of fun playing this game, and I’d highly recommend it to fans of the game genre, Sherlock Holmes literature, and those who enjoy more light-hearted mystery games."

The game was listed in Kotaku's "Best Games of 2025 So Far". It has been nominated for the 2026 Gayming Awards in the categories of Best LGBTQ+ Indie Game and LGBTQ+ Voice Actor of the Year for Tobias Weatherburn.
