= Baskerville: A Sherlock Holmes Mystery =

Play by Ken Ludwig

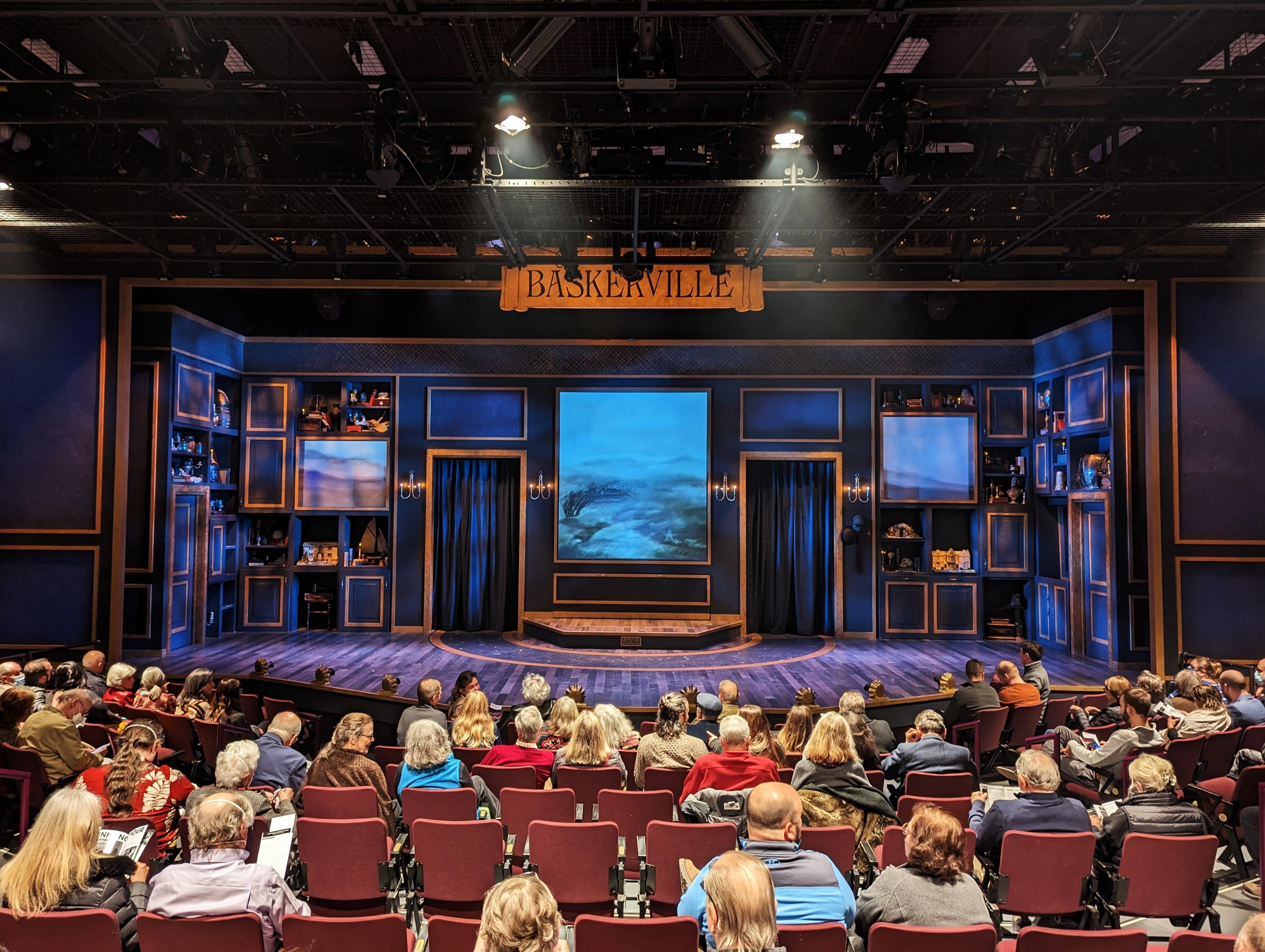
The stage at Everyman Theatre in Baltimore ahead of a 2023 performance of Baskerville.

Baskerville: A Sherlock Holmes Mystery is a play by American playwright Ken Ludwig. It premiered at the Arena Stage in Southwest, Washington, D.C. in January 2015 and was directed by Amanda Dehnert.

The play is a humorous adaptation of Sir Arthur Conan Doyle's 1902 novel The Hound of the Baskervilles featuring over forty characters played by five actors.

== Arena Stage production ==
Rehearsals were staged at McCarter Theatre Center in Princeton, New Jersey. The play featured two main roles, Sherlock Holmes and Dr. Watson, as well as numerous other roles played by only three other actors. Michael Glenn's roles included Daisy the scullery maid, Scotland Yard Inspector Lestrade and Sir Henry Baskerville. Author Ludwig wanted to infuse suspense with humor saying "You’re not making fun of the genre, [but] at the same time, there’s a lot of laughs, because they come out of the tension."

=== Cast ===
- Gregory Wooddell as Sherlock Holmes
- Lucas Hall as Dr. Watson

The other 40-plus roles were performed by three actors: Stanley Bahorek, Michael Glenn and Jane Pfitsch.

== Old Globe Theatre production ==
The play, directed by Josh Rhodes, opened at Old Globe Theatre in San Diego, California on July 30, 2015 and ran through September 6, 2015.

=== Cast ===
- Euan Morton as Sherlock Holmes
- Usman Ally as Dr. Watson

Other roles played by Andrew Kober, Blake Segal and Liz Wisan.

== Liverpool Playhouse production ==
The play, directed by Loveday Ingram, Liverpool Playhouse, in Liverpool, England on December 9, 2017.

=== Cast ===
- Jay Taylor as Sherlock Holmes
- Patrick Robinson as Dr. Watson

Other roles played by Bessie Carter, Edward Harrison and Ryan Pope.

== Park Square Theatre production ==
In July and August 2018, Theo Langason directed an adaptation of the play at Park Square Theatre in Saint Paul, Minnesota. It starred McKenna Kelly-Eiding and Marika Proctor as female Holmes and Watson, respectively. All the remaining roles were played by Eric "Pogi" Sumangil, Ricardo Beaird and Marika Proctor.

Lavender Magazine's John Townsend called the production "triumphantly entertaining," citing the actors' comedic timing.
