= Sherlock Holmes and the Baskerville Curse =

1983 television film directed by Eddie Graham

- Genre: Mystery
- Based on: The Hound of the Baskervilles by Arthur Conan Doyle
- Written by: Eddie Graham
- Directed by: Eddie Graham
- Country of origin: Australia
- Original language: English

Production
- Producer: Eddie Graham
- Production company: Burbank Films Australia

Original release
- Release: 1 January 1983

Sherlock Holmes and the Baskerville Curse is a 1983 Australian animated television film directed by Eddie Graham. It is an adaptation of Sir Arthur Conan Doyle's novel The Hound of the Baskervilles (1901–1902), the third of his novels featuring Sherlock Holmes and Dr. John Watson.

== Plot ==
The film tells about Holmes' adventure, based on the legend of the Baskerville family's hound.

== Voice cast ==
- Peter O'Toole as Sherlock Holmes
- Earle Cross as Dr. James Watson
- Additional voices are provided by Ron Haddrick, Helen Morse, Robin Stewart, Moya O'Sullivan and Phillip Hinton
