= The Case of the Whitechapel Vampire =

- Written by: Characters by Arthur Conan Doyle
- Screenplay by: Rodney Gibbons
- Directed by: Rodney Gibbons
- Starring: Matt Frewer; Kenneth Welsh
- Music by: Marc Ouellette
- Original language: English

Production
- Producer: Irene Litinsky
- Cinematography: Serge Ladouceur
- Running time: 90 minutes

Original release
- Network: Hallmark Channel
- Release: 2002

The Case of the Whitechapel Vampire is a non-canonical Sherlock Holmes film. The film was produced in 2002 for The Hallmark Channel as the last installment in a series of Hallmark Sherlock Holmes films.

== Plot ==
Sherlock Holmes and Dr. Watson are called to Whitechapel after learning about a series of strange murders only two years after the Jack the Ripper murders in the same neighborhood. The local belief is that the killings are the work of a vampire brought back from a recent mission in Guyana. As they investigate the deaths, they engage in an ongoing debate about the supernatural, with Watson believing in the possibility of vampires and Holmes remaining skeptical until he is able to prove the murders are the works of a living human, rather than any undead creature. At one point, the investigation leads them to the psychic Madame Karasky, who says that Holmes will be saved by the church. Shortly thereafter, Holmes is pushed in front of a moving carriage by the supposed vampire, only to be saved by a pedestrian. In order to catch the murderer, Holmes disguises himself as a monk and reveals that the vampire was Brother Abel, who hoped to get revenge on the monks who didn't listen to him when he believed that the bats were causing rabies in the South American mission, when he was infected. The film ends at Baker Street, when Mrs. Hudson gives Holmes his pipe, delivered by the same man that saved Holmes from being run over. When Holmes asks his name, Mrs. Hudson says his name was Reginald Church.

== Cast ==
- Matt Frewer - Sherlock Holmes
- Kenneth Welsh - Dr. Watson
- Kathleen McAuliffe - Mrs. Hudson
- Michel Perron - Inspector Jones
- Neville Edwards - Dr. Chagas
- Joel Miller - Brother Caulder
- Danny Blanco - Hector de la Rosa
- Norris Domingue - Brother Sinclair
- Isabel Dos Santos - Signora de la Rosa
- Kathleen Fee - Mme Karavsky
- Jere Gillis - The Thing

== List of Hallmark Sherlock Holmes films ==
- The Hound of the Baskervilles (2000)
- The Sign of Four (2001 film) (2001)
- The Royal Scandal (2001)
- The Case of the Whitechapel Vampire (2002)
