= The Royal Scandal =

- Based on: A Scandal in Bohemia and The Bruce-Partington Plans by Arthur Conan Doyle
- Screenplay by: Joe Wiesenfeld
- Directed by: Rodney Gibbons
- Starring: Matt Frewer; Kenneth Welsh
- Music by: Marc Ouellette
- Original language: English

Production
- Producer: Irene Litinsky
- Cinematography: Serge Ladouceur
- Running time: 120 minutes

Original release
- Network: Hallmark Channel
- Release: 2001

Related
- The Sign of Four; The Case of the Whitechapel Vampire

The Royal Scandal is a Sherlock Holmes film which is an amalgam of "A Scandal in Bohemia" and "The Bruce-Partington Plans". The film was produced in 2001 for Hallmark Channel as part of an ongoing series of Hallmark Sherlock Holmes films.

== Production ==
The third of four Holmes adaptations starring Frewer as Holmes, was preceded by The Hound of the Baskervilles in 2000 and The Sign of Four in 2001, and followed by The Case of the Whitechapel Vampire (an original story) in 2002.

== Cast ==
- Matt Frewer - Sherlock Holmes
- Kenneth Welsh - Dr. Watson
- Liliana Komorowska - Irene Adler
- Daniel Brochu - Wiggins
- Seann Gallagher - Meisener
- R.H. Thomson - Mycroft Holmes
- Robin Wilcock - Crown Prince
- Alain Goulem - PC Trevor
- Jacob Richmond - Cadogan West
- Kathleen McAuliffe - Mrs. Hudson
