= The Sign of Four (2001 film) =

Canadian television film

- Based on: The Sign of the Four by Arthur Conan Doyle
- Screenplay by: Joe Wiesenfeld
- Directed by: Rodney Gibbons
- Starring: Matt Frewer; Kenneth Welsh
- Music by: Marc Ouellette
- Original language: English

Production
- Producer: Irene Litinsky
- Cinematography: Eric Cayla
- Editor: Vidal Béïque
- Running time: 90 minutes

Original release
- Release: 2001

Related
- The Hound of the Baskervilles; The Royal Scandal

The Sign of Four (2001) is a Canadian television film directed by Rodney Gibbons and starring Matt Frewer and Kenneth Welsh. The movie is based on Arthur Conan Doyle's second Sherlock Holmes novel published in 1890.

== Plot summary ==
Mary Morstan receives a beautiful pearl every year from an unknown sender. With the latest pearl, this mysterious person finally asks to meet her. She turns to Sherlock Holmes and Dr. Watson for help. Their investigation pulls them into a dark story of revenge.

== Production ==
The second of four Holmes adaptations starring Frewer as Holmes, was preceded by The Hound of the Baskervilles in 2000, and then followed by The Royal Scandal (a blend of "A Scandal in Bohemia" and "The Bruce-Partington Plans") also in 2001, and The Case of the Whitechapel Vampire (an original story) in 2002.

Frewer's portrayal of Holmes was largely criticized once again.

== Differences from novel ==
Unlike the source novel, the movie features Holmes meeting with a Scotland Yard chemist named Professor Morgan who not only identifies the poison which killed Bartholomew Sholto but creates an antidote for Holmes.

Tonga is portrayed not as the “savage pygmy” of the novel but instead as an Asian with facial markings.

== Cast ==
- Matt Frewer as Sherlock Holmes
- Kenneth Welsh as Dr. John H. Watson
- Johni Keyworth as Major John Sholto
- Sophie Lorain as Mary Morstan
- Edward Yankie as John Small
- Marcel Jeannin as Thaddeus / Bartholomew Sholto
- Michel Perron as Inspector Jones
