= Leyland Hodgson =

American actor

- Born: 5 October 1892; London, England
- Died: 16 March 1949 (aged 56); Hollywood, California, U.S.
- Occupation: Actor
- Years active: 1930–1949

Leyland Hodgson (5 October 1892 – 16 March 1949), also known as Leland Hodgson, was an English-born American character actor of the 1930s and 1940s.

== Early years ==
Hodgson was born in London on 5 October 1892. As the attraction of performing increased, his interest in studying diminished.

== Career ==
Hodgson entered the theatre in 1898. He toured with a stock troupe in Australian provinces, after which he acted in London and on tours of various countries, including seven years in the Orient. He returned to Australia in the early 1920s and acted there. In 1930 he went to Hollywood, where he made his film debut in the Oscar-nominated film, The Case of Sergeant Grischa in 1930.

He continued to act on stage after the move, including a production of East of Suez at the Belasco Theater in Los Angeles in 1930. In 1934 he managed and acted with the International Players stock company.

Over his almost twenty-year career, he appeared in over 130 films, mostly in supporting or smaller roles. He is best known for his work on the Sherlock Holmes franchise of the late 1930s and 1940s, beginning with 1939's The Adventures of Sherlock Holmes.

== Death ==
Hodgson died of a heart attack in Hollywood on 16 March 1949, aged 56, shortly after completing the filming of That Forsyte Woman, which would be released later that year. He was interred at Grand View Memorial Park Cemetery in Glendale, California.

== Filmography ==
(Per AFI database)

- High Stakes (1931)
- Under-Cover Man (1932)
- The Eagle and the Hawk (1933)
- One in a Million (1934)
- The Painted Veil (1934)
- The Human Side (1934)
- A Feather in Her Hat (1935)
- The Perfect Gentleman (1935)
- Beloved Enemy (1936)
- The King Steps Out (1936)
- Adventure in Manhattan (1936)
- Trouble for Two (1936)
- The Great Garrick (1937)
- Call It a Day (1937)
- The Adventurous Blonde (1937)
- Confession (1937)
- Parnell (1937)
- The Prince and the Pauper (1937)
- London by Night (1937)
- When You're in Love (1937)
- Personal Property (1937)
- The Buccaneer (1938)
- Men Are Such Fools (1938)
- Booloo (1938)
- Love Is a Headache (1938)
- Kidnapped (1938)
- Fools for Scandal (1938)
- Over the Wall (1938)
- Up the River (1938)
- Mysterious Mr. Moto (1938)
- Daughters Courageous (1939)
- Mr. Moto's Last Warning (1939)
- Mr. Moto Takes a Vacation (1939)
- Eternally Yours (1939)
- Dark Victory (1939)
- The Adventures of Sherlock Holmes (1939)
- The Rains Came (1939)
- Second Fiddle (1939)
- They Made Me a Criminal (1939)
- Pack Up Your Troubles (1939)
- Susannah of the Mounties (1939)
- Pride of the Blue Grass (1939)
- The Witness Vanishes (1939)
- We Are Not Alone (1939)
- The Invisible Man Returns (1940)
- Murder Over New York (1940)
- I Was an Adventuress (1940)
- The Man I Married (1940)
- Captain Caution (1940)
- Lillian Russell (1940)
- Buck Benny Rides Again (1940)
- British Intelligence (1940)
- South of Suez (1940)
- He Married His Wife (1940)
- Mystery Sea Raider (1940)
- The Case of the Black Parrot (1941)
- International Lady (1941)
- International Squadron (1941)
- The Kid from Kansas (1941)
- Moon Over Miami (1941)
- Ride, Kelly, Ride (1941)
- Road Agent (1941)
- Scotland Yard (1941)
- Singapore Woman (1941)
- Rage in Heaven (1941)
- They Met in Bombay (1941)
- The Wolf Man (1941)
- A Yank in the R.A.F. (1941)
- Danger in the Pacific (1942)
- Escape from Hong Kong (1942)
- The Ghost of Frankenstein (1942)
- Journey for Margaret (1942)
- Just Off Broadway (1942)
- My Favorite Blonde (1942)
- Secret Agent of Japan (1942)
- Sherlock Holmes and the Voice of Terror (1942)
- The Strange Case of Doctor Rx (1942)
- This Above All (1942)
- To Be or Not to Be (1942)
- Flesh and Fantasy (1943)
- The Gang's All Here (1943)
- Happy Go Lucky (1943)
- Holy Matrimony (1943)
- The Man from Down Under (1943)
- Sahara (1943)
- Sherlock Holmes and the Secret Weapon (1943)
- Sherlock Holmes in Washington (1943)
- Two Tickets to London (1943)
- Assignment in Brittany (1943)
- Appointment in Berlin (1943)
- The Invisible Man's Revenge (1944)
- Frenchman's Creek (1944)
- Follow the Boys (1944)
- Enter Arsene Lupin (1944)
- Around the World (1944)
- The Man in Half Moon Street (1944)
- None But the Lonely Heart (1944)
- The Pearl of Death (1944)
- The Uninvited (1944)
- National Velvet (1945)
- Nothing But Trouble (1945)
- Confidential Agent (1945)
- The Frozen Ghost (1945)
- Hangover Square (1945)
- Johnny Angel (1945)
- My Name Is Julia Ross (1945)
- Son of Lassie (1945)
- Kitty (1946)
- Bedlam (1946)
- Black Beauty (1946)
- Dressed to Kill (1946)
- Rendezvous 24 (1946)
- The Secret Heart (1946)
- Terror by Night (1946)
- Three Strangers (1946)
- To Each His Own (1946)
- Under Nevada Skies (1946)
- Calcutta (1947)
- Forever Amber (1947)
- The Imperfect Lady (1947)
- Repeat Performance (1947)
- Singapore (1947)
- Bob, Son of Battle (1947)
- The Two Mrs. Carrolls (1947)
- Joan of Arc (1948)
- Unconquered (1948)
- A Woman's Vengeance (1948)
- The Black Arrow (1948)
- The Challenge (1948)
- Kiss the Blood Off My Hands (1948) as Tipster
- That Forsyte Woman (1949)
