= The Spider Woman =

1943 mystery film directed by Roy William Neill

- 1943 US theatrical poster
- Directed by: Roy William Neill
- Written by: Bertram Millhauser
- Based on: Characters by Sir Arthur Conan Doyle
- Produced by: Roy William Neill
- Starring: Basil Rathbone; Nigel Bruce; Gale Sondergaard
- Cinematography: Charles Van Enger
- Edited by: William Austin
- Music by: Hans J. Salter
- Distributed by: Universal Pictures
- Release date: December 10, 1943
- Running time: 62 minutes
- Country: United States
- Language: English

The Spider Woman (alternatively titled Sherlock Holmes and the Spider Woman and Spider Woman) is a 1943 mystery film starring Basil Rathbone as Sherlock Holmes and Nigel Bruce as Dr. Watson, the seventh of fourteen such films the pair were involved in. As with all of the Universal Studios films in the series, the film is set in then-present day as opposed to the Victorian setting of the original stories. This film incorporates elements from the 1890 novel The Sign of the Four, as well as the short stories "The Final Problem", "The Adventure of the Empty House", "The Adventure of the Speckled Band" and makes explicit reference to "The Adventure of the Devil's Foot".

== Plot ==
Consulting detective Sherlock Holmes fakes his own death in Scotland in order to investigate a number of bizarre apparent suicides that he is convinced are part of an elaborate plot by "a female Moriarty". Returning to his assistant Dr. Watson in secret, Holmes notes that all the victims were wealthy gamblers, so disguised as "Rajni Singh", a distinguished Indian officer, he stalks London's gaming clubs.

It is not long before he encounters the archvillain, Adrea Spedding. Holmes discovers that she seeks out men short of money, persuades them to pawn their life insurance policies with her accomplices, then kills them. Holmes sets himself up as her next victim, discovering that she uses the deadly spider, Lycosa carnivora, whose venom causes such excruciating pain that the victims kill themselves. Holmes also finds the footprint of a child nearby.

Searching for evidence Holmes and Watson visit eminent arachnologist Matthew Ordway, who may have supplied the deadly creatures. Holmes soon realizes that the man he is speaking to is an impostor, but the man makes his escape. Searching the premises, Holmes finds the corpse of the real Ordway, as well as his journals, which allude to something or someone from Central Africa immune to the spider venom. This baffles Holmes until he finds the model skeleton of a child. However, Dr. Watson points out that the relation of the skull and the circumference of the chest prove it is not a child, and Holmes deduces that the Central African thing described in the journal is a pygmy.

Holmes and Watson continue their investigations at a nearby fairground, where Holmes allows himself to fall into the clutches of Spedding and her gang. Bound and gagged, Holmes is tied behind a moving target in a shooting gallery, at which Inspector Lestrade and Watson take pot shots with a .22 rifle. However Holmes manages to escape, and Lestrade and the police arrest Spedding, her gang, and the pygmy. As an indication of respect for her intellect, Holmes tells Lestrade to spare Spedding the indignity of handcuffs, saying "she'll go quietly." Spedding appreciatively smiles and thanks Holmes as she is taken away.

== Cast ==
- Basil Rathbone as Sherlock Holmes
- Nigel Bruce as Dr. John Watson
- Gale Sondergaard as Adrea Spedding
- Vernon Downing as Norman Locke
- Dennis Hoey as Inspector Lestrade
- Alec Craig as Radlik
- Arthur Hohl as Adam Gilflower
- Mary Gordon as Mrs. Hudson
- Teddy Infuhr as Larry
- Angelo Rossitto as The Pygmy
- Harry Cording as Fred Garvin (uncredited)
- Robert Milasch as Carnival Barker (uncredited)
- Belle Mitchell as Carnival Fortune Teller
- Frank Benson as Kewpie Doll Vendor
- Gene Roth as Taylor

== Allusions to the Sherlock Holmes canon ==
- Though The Spider Woman has an original plot, the film heavily features elements from various stories by Arthur Conan Doyle. Holmes faking his death at a waterfall is similar to the climax of "The Final Problem" and his subsequent reappearance in the presence of a mourning Watson bears resemblance to "The Empty House". The use of a pygmy confederate is taken from the novel The Sign of Four and the murder by use of a venomous animal inserted through a ventilation system is taken from "The Speckled Band", though the swamp adder of that story is replaced by a spider (just as it was in "The Adventure of the Deptford Horror", a Sherlockian pastiche by Adrian Conan Doyle). The mute child with a compulsion to catch flies is similar to a character in "The Copper Beeches". The film also featured elements of "The Devil's Foot". Holmes described the antagonist as a "female Moriarty", referencing his nemesis Professor James Moriarty. (Although she bears some traits in common with Irene Adler.) Holmes' request that Watson whisper "pygmy" in his ear if he becomes overconfident is from "The Yellow Face", in which the word was "Norbury".
- Elements of The Spider Woman were given homage in the Sherlock episode "The Empty Hearse", including Watson mistaking a genuine client for a false-bearded Holmes in disguise.
- Gale Sondergaard starred in a similar role in the misleadingly-titled The Spider Woman Strikes Back also produced by Universal, with which there is no canonical relation.
- Filmed during World War II, the moving targets in the shooting gallery are Hitler, Mussolini and Hirohito cartoons. Previous films Sherlock Holmes and the Voice of Terror and Sherlock Holmes and the Secret Weapon featured Nazis as antagonists, but all succeeding sequels downplayed their propaganda purposes.

== See also ==
- Sherlock Holmes (1939 film series)
- Adaptations of Sherlock Holmes in film
