= Morton Lowry =

British actor (1914–1987)

- Born: Edward Morton Lowater; 13 February 1914; Lancashire, England
- Died: 26 November 1987 (aged 73); San Francisco, California, U.S.
- Occupations: Film and television actor
- Years active: 1938–1960
- Known for: Roles in The Hound of the Baskervilles and How Green was My Valley
- Spouse(s): Diana Whalley (m. 1934; div. 1936) Virginia Barnato (m. 1938; div. 1949) Lilian Bond (m. 1950; div. 1956)
- Children: 2

Morton Lowry (born Edward Morton Lowater; 13 February 1914 – 26 November 1987) was a British actor. He is best known for his film roles as John Stapleton in The Hound of The Baskervilles (1939) and for his role as Mr. Jonas in How Green was My Valley (1941). He also appeared in other films including Pursuit to Algiers and The Picture of Dorian Gray (both 1945).

== Personal life ==
Morton was born in Lancashire, England as Edward Morton Lowater to Edward Morton Lowater, Sr., an engineer, and Bithiah 'Bertha' Holmes. The family later moved to the Russell Square area of London.

Morton was married at least three times. His first marriage was in 1934, when he was 20 years old, to Diana Whalley. This short-lived marriage ended in divorce in 1936. On 27 February 1938, Morton married socialite Virginia Barnato, granddaughter of diamond dealer Barney Barnato and daughter of racing car driver Woolf Barnato, on a San Francisco theatre stage after announcing their engagement on 15 February 1938. This relationship did not survive but one son was born.

Morton went on to marry once more in 1957 and, though this union also ended in divorce, it produced one more child in 1958.

Morton Lowry moved back to the United States in the early 1960s to revive his film career. He died on 26 November 1987 at a San Francisco UCSF hospital from heart failure due to complications during surgery. His death was indigent and he was buried by the state at Pleasant Hill Cemetery in Sebastopol, California, on 14 January 1988.

== Career ==
Morton started his stage career using the name Edward Lowater. He appeared in many stage revues, appearing in theatres such as the Alhambra Theatre, the London Astoria and the Garrick Theatre, where he is mostly credited as being part of the singing and dancing chorus line. He can be found credited in shows such as Over the Page in September 1933 and The Drunkard in November 1934.

His first known big break came in the role of Donnie in the film The Dawn Patrol acting under the name of Morton Lowry. This led to a respectable film career in which he completed over 25 films, including How Green Was My Valley, which received ten Academy Award nominations in the United States. He was one of the few actors to appear as different characters in the Basil Rathbone/Nigel Bruce Sherlock Holmes film series, as John Stapleton in The Hound of the Baskervilles (1939) and as the steward Sanford in Pursuit to Algiers (1945).

In 1947, Lowry's film career dwindled, with his last American film role being uncredited as a scared man in Calcutta. His last British film role was as Dinelli's driver in the 1960 film Too Hot to Handle.

Morton ventured into television work during the 1950s, most of which was in the United Kingdom. His work includes BBC Sunday Night Theatre in 1951, Theatre Royal (television film) in 1952 and Sword of Freedom in 1957. During 1959, he played various characters in the television series The Four Just Men. He also appeared as the Lieutenant in the 1959–60 television series The Adventures of Robin Hood in at least 12 episodes.

== Filmography ==
List of acting performances in film and television
Title	Year	Role	Notes
The Dawn Patrol	1938	Donnie Scott	
The Little Princess	1939	Traumatized Young Soldier	Uncredited
The Hound of the Baskervilles	1939	John Stapleton	
Tarzan Finds a Son!	1939	Richard Lancing	
Winter Carnival	1939	Count Olaf Von Lundborg	
British Intelligence	1940	Lt. Borden	Uncredited
Hudson's Bay	1940	Gerald Hall	
Charley's Aunt	1941	Harley Stafford	
A Yank in the R.A.F.	1941	Squadron Leader Macbeth	
How Green Was My Valley	1941	Mr. Jonas	
Captains of the Clouds	1942	Carmichael	
This Above All	1942	Soldier	Uncredited
The Pied Piper	1942	Roger Dickinson	Uncredited
The Loves of Edgar Allan Poe	1942	Charles Dickens	
Counter-Espionage	1942	Kurt Weil	
Immortal Sergeant	1943	Cottrell	
No Time for Love	1943	Dunbar	Uncredited
Corvette K-225	1943	British Lieutenant	Uncredited
The Story of Dr. Wassell	1944	Lieutenant Bainbridge	Uncredited
The Hour Before the Dawn	1944	Jackson	Uncredited
None but the Lonely Heart	1944	Taz Jones	Uncredited
The Man in Half Moon Street	1945	Alan Guthrie	
The Picture of Dorian Gray	1945	Adrian Singleton	
Son of Lassie	1945	Blind Corporal P.O.W.	Uncredited
Pursuit to Algiers	1945	Sanford	
The Verdict	1946	Arthur Kendall	
Calcutta	1947	Scared man	Uncredited
Sunday Night Theatre	1951	Jerry Seymour / William Avery	2 episodes
Theatre Royal	1952	Tony Cavendish	TV movie
Sword of Freedom	1957	Orlando de Giovanni	Episode: "A Game of Chance"
The Four Just Men	1959	Captain / Watkins / Harry Green	3 episodes
The Adventures of Robin Hood	1959–1960	Lieutenant	At least twelve episodes, (final appearance)
Too Hot to Handle	1960	Driver	
