= Frederick Worlock =

English-American actor (1886–1973)

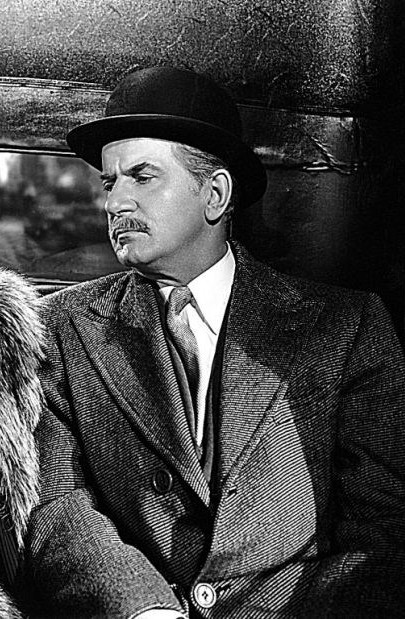
- Worlock in Dressed to Kill (1946)
- Born: 14 December 1886; London, England
- Died: 1 August 1973 (aged 86); Woodland Hills, California, U.S.
- Resting place: Valhalla Memorial Park Cemetery; North Hollywood, California
- Occupation: Actor
- Years active: 1914–1970
- Spouse: Elsie Ferguson (m. 1924; div. 1930)

Frederick Worlock (14 December 1886 – 1 August 1973) was an English-American actor. He is known for his work in various films during the 1940s and 1950s, and as the voice of Horace in One Hundred and One Dalmatians (1961) and again, without credit, in The Sword in the Stone (1963).

== Career ==
On stage, he made his début in 1906 in Henry V in Bristol and acted in four productions in London before moving to the United States in the 1920s, where he appeared in Broadway productions between 1923 and 1954.

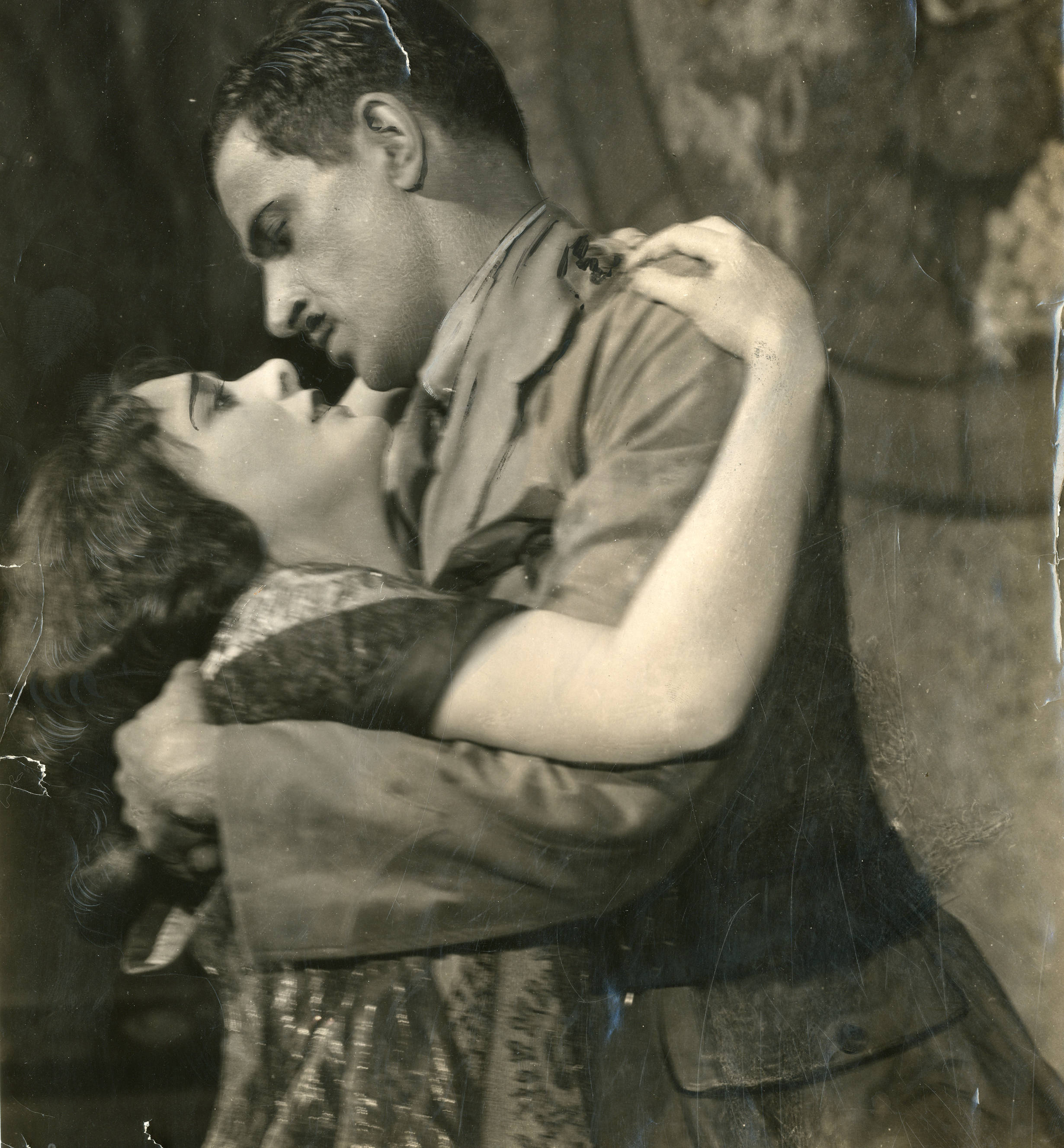
Worlock and Elsie Ferguson in the 1922–1923 U.S. stage production of The Wheel of Life by J. B. Fagan

From 1938 to 1966, Worlock appeared as a supporting actor in films including Man Hunt, Dr. Jekyll and Mr. Hyde, How Green Was My Valley, The Imperfect Lady, Singapore, The Lone Wolf in London, Love from a Stranger, Ruthless, Joan of Arc, Spartacus, One Hundred and One Dalmatians (voice-over), The Sword in the Stone (Uncredited voice over), and Spinout. He appeared in a number of the Sherlock Holmes films starring Basil Rathbone in the 1940s, also portraying Inspector Lestrade opposite Rathbone in The New Adventures of Sherlock Holmes. Worlock often portrayed "professorial roles, some benign, some villainous".

== Personal life ==
On 5 May 1924, in Great Neck, Long Island, he married actress Elsie Ferguson, with whom he had appeared in The Moon-Flower on Broadway. The marriage ended in divorce in 1930.

Worlock died from cerebral ischemia in 1973, at the age of 86. He was buried in Valhalla Memorial Park Cemetery.

== Partial filmography ==
- Miracles for Sale (1939) - Dr. Sabbatt (as Frederic Worlock)
- Lady of the Tropics (1939) - Colonel Demassey
- Balalaika (1939) - Ramensky
- The Earl of Chicago (1940) - Lord Elfie (uncredited)
- Northwest Passage (1940) - Sir William Johnson (uncredited)
- Strange Cargo (1940) - Grideau
- The Sea Hawk (1940) - Darnell (uncredited)
- He Stayed for Breakfast (1940) - Communist President (uncredited)
- South of Suez (1940) - Defense Counsel
- Moon Over Burma (1940) - Stephen Harmon
- Murder Over New York (1940) - Hugh Drake
- Hudson's Bay (1941) - English Governor
- Free and Easy (1941) - Manager
- Rage in Heaven (1941) - Solicitor-General
- Man Hunt (1941) - Lord Gerald Risborough
- Dr. Jekyll and Mr. Hyde (1941) - Dr. Heath
- Down in San Diego (1941) - Eric Kramer (uncredited)
- International Lady (1941) - Sir Henry
- A Yank in the R.A.F. (1941) - Canadian Major
- How Green Was My Valley (1941) - Dr. Richards
- Captains of the Clouds (1942) - President of Court-Martial
- Pacific Rendezvous (1942) - Dr. Jackwin
- Eagle Squadron (1942) - Grenfall
- Pierre of the Plains (1942) - Inspector Cannady
- The Black Swan (1942) - Speaker of Assembly (uncredited)
- Random Harvest (1942) - Margaret's Lawyer (uncredited)
- London Blackout Murders (1943) - Eugene Caldwell
- Sherlock Holmes in Washington (1943) - Radio Announcer (uncredited)
- Air Raid Wardens (1943) - Otto
- The Mantrap (1943) - Patrick Berwick
- Thumbs Up (1943) - Kendrick (uncredited)
- Appointment in Berlin (1943) - Von Ritter, Ministry of Information (uncredited)
- Secret Service in Darkest Africa (1943, Serial) - Sir James Langley [Ch. 15]
- Passport to Suez (1943) - Sir Robert Wembley (uncredited)
- Sahara (1943) - Radio Newscaster (voice, uncredited)
- Sherlock Holmes Faces Death (1943) - Geoffrey Musgrave
- Madame Curie (1943) - Businessman (uncredited)
- Jane Eyre (1943) - Sam, Waiter at Inn (uncredited)
- The Lodger (1944) - Sir Edward Willoughby (uncredited)
- Secrets of Scotland Yard (1944) - Mason
- Wing and a Prayer (1944) - Admiral (uncredited)
- National Velvet (1944) - Stewart (uncredited)
- Hangover Square (1945) - Superintendent Clay (uncredited)
- The Picture of Dorian Gray (1945) - Francis (uncredited)
- The Woman in Green (1945) - Onslow
- The Fatal Witness (1945) - Sir Humphrey Mong
- Scotland Yard Investigator (1945) - Colonel Brent
- Pursuit to Algiers (1945) - Prime Minister
- Captain Kidd (1945) - Landers, Newgate Prison Governor (uncredited)
- Terror by Night (1946) - Professor William Kilbane
- She-Wolf of London (1946) - Constable Ernie Hobbs
- Dressed to Kill (1946) - Colonel Cavanaugh
- The Locket (1946) - Doctor (uncredited)
- The Macomber Affair (1947) - Clerk
- The Imperfect Lady (1947) - Henderson
- Last of the Redmen (1947) - General Webb (uncredited)
- Singapore (1947) - Cadum
- Forever Amber (1947) - Actor (uncredited)
- The Lone Wolf in London (1947) - Inspector Broome
- Love from a Stranger (1947) - Inspector Hobday
- A Double Life (1947) - Actor in 'Othello'
- A Woman's Vengeance (1948) - Judge (uncredited)
- Ruthless (1948) - J. Norton Sims
- The Woman in White (1948) - Bernard (uncredited)
- Johnny Belinda (1948) - Prosecutor (uncredited)
- Joan of Arc (1948) - Duke of Bedford, England's Regent
- Hills of Home (1948) - Dr. Weston
- A Connecticut Yankee in King Arthur's Court (1949) - Mayor (uncredited)
- Alfred Hitchcock Presents (1957) (Season 2 Episode 36: "Father and Son") - Gus Harrison
- Alfred Hitchcock Presents (1958) (Season 3 Episode 34: "The Crocodile Case") - Dan Mintz
- Alfred Hitchcock Presents (1958) (Season 3 Episode 38: "The Impromptu Murder") - Barclay
- Alfred Hitchcock Presents (1959) (Season 4 Episode 21: "Relative Value") - Mr. Betts
- Jet Over the Atlantic (1959) - Dean Halltree
- Spartacus (1960) - Senator Laelius
- One Hundred and One Dalmatians (1961) - Horace / Inspector Craven (voice)
- The Notorious Landlady (1962) - Elderly Colonel (uncredited)
- The Sword in the Stone (1963) - Additional (voice) (uncredited)
- Strange Bedfellows (1965) - Mr. Martindale, Lawyer (uncredited)
- Spinout (1966) - Blodgett
- Airport (1970) - Frederick Williams, Passenger (uncredited) (final film role)
