= Dressed to Kill (1946 film) =

1946 film by Roy William Neill

- Directed by: Roy William Neill
- Written by: Frank Gruber; Leonard Lee
- Based on: The Adventure of the Six Napoleons; 1903 short stories (56) by Sir Arthur Conan Doyle
- Produced by: Roy William Neill
- Starring: Basil Rathbone; Nigel Bruce; Patricia Morison
- Cinematography: Maury Gertsman
- Edited by: Saul A. Goodkind
- Music by: Milton Rosen
- Production company: Universal Pictures
- Distributed by: Universal Pictures
- Release dates: May 24, 1946 (New York City, New York); June 7, 1946 (United States)
- Running time: 76 minutes (copyright length); 72 minutes (restored version)
- Country: United States
- Language: English

Dressed to Kill

Dressed to Kill is a 1946 American mystery film directed by Roy William Neill. Released by Universal Pictures, it is the last of fourteen films starring Basil Rathbone as Sherlock Holmes and Nigel Bruce as Doctor Watson. It is also known by the alternative titles Prelude to Murder (working title) and Sherlock Holmes and the Secret Code in the United Kingdom.

The film has an original story, but combines elements of the short stories "The Adventure of the Six Napoleons" and "A Scandal in Bohemia." It is one of four films in the series which are in the public domain and is available online.

== Plot ==
John Davidson, a convicted thief in Dartmoor prison, embeds code revealing the hidden location of extremely valuable stolen Bank of England currency printing plates in the melody notes of three music boxes that he crafts to be sold at auction. Each box plays a subtly different version of an Australian tune, "The Swagman". At the auction each is purchased by a different buyer.

Dr. Watson's friend, Julian Emery, a music box collector, pays him and Sherlock Holmes a visit and tells them of an attempted burglary in his house the previous night of a plain cheap box (similar to the one he bought at auction) while leaving other much more valuable ones. Holmes asks to see, and he and Watson are shown Emery's collection. After they leave, Emery welcomes a female acquaintance, Hilda Courtney, who tries unsuccessfully to buy the auctioned box. When Emery declines, a male friend of Courtney's who has sneaked in murders Emery.

At this murder Holmes becomes even more curious and learns to whom else the boxes were auctioned off. Holmes and Watson arrive at the house of the person who bought the second one, just as a strange maid (Courtney in disguise) is on her way "to go shopping". Holmes later realizes it was not a maid: she locked a child in a closet in order to steal the box from the child.

Holmes is able to buy the third box, and upon examination discovers that its variant musical notes' numbers correlate to letters of the alphabet. Scotland Yard fills him in on the stolen bank plates to which the music boxes connect, but all three are needed to decipher the message.

Back at home, their flat is found ransacked, and a cigarette with a distinct type of tobacco is the sole clue. Holmes tracks down the woman who bought the tobacco, Courtney.

While confronting her, Holmes is ambushed by her accomplices, handcuffed, taken to a warehouse, hung by a rafter, and left with poison gas filling the room. While Holmes is narrowly escaping death, Courtney visits the flat and steals the box from Watson.

Holmes manages to make it back in one piece and, while conversing with him, Watson offhandedly mentions a quote from Dr. Samuel Johnson. Thinking about this quote, Holmes makes a connection as to where the stolen plates may be hidden.

Having stolen all the boxes and deciphered their message, Courtney and gang join a tour group at Dr. Samuel Johnson's house, now a museum, where they slip away and find the plates hidden within a bookshelf. Courtney is stealing the plates when Holmes ambushes the group. Scotland Yard officers arrest them, and the plates are returned to the bank.

== Cast ==
- Basil Rathbone as Sherlock Holmes
- Nigel Bruce as Dr. John H. Watson
- Patricia Morison as Hilda Courtney/Charwoman
- Edmund Breon as Julian "Stinky" Emery (as Edmond Breon)
- Frederick Worlock as Colonel Cavanaugh (as Frederic Worlock)
- Carl Harbord as Inspector Hopkins
- Patricia Cameron as Evelyn Clifford
- Holmes Herbert as Ebenezer Crabtree
- Harry Cording as Hamid
- Leyland Hodgson as Tour Guide
- Mary Gordon as Mrs. Hudson
- Ian Wolfe as Scotland Yard Commissioner
- Anita Sharp-Bolster as the Schoolteacher on a Museum Tour

== See also ==
- Sherlock Holmes (1939 film series)
- Adaptations of Sherlock Holmes in cinema
