= Sherlock Holmes (1939 film series) =

Film series starring Basil Rathbone (1939–1946)

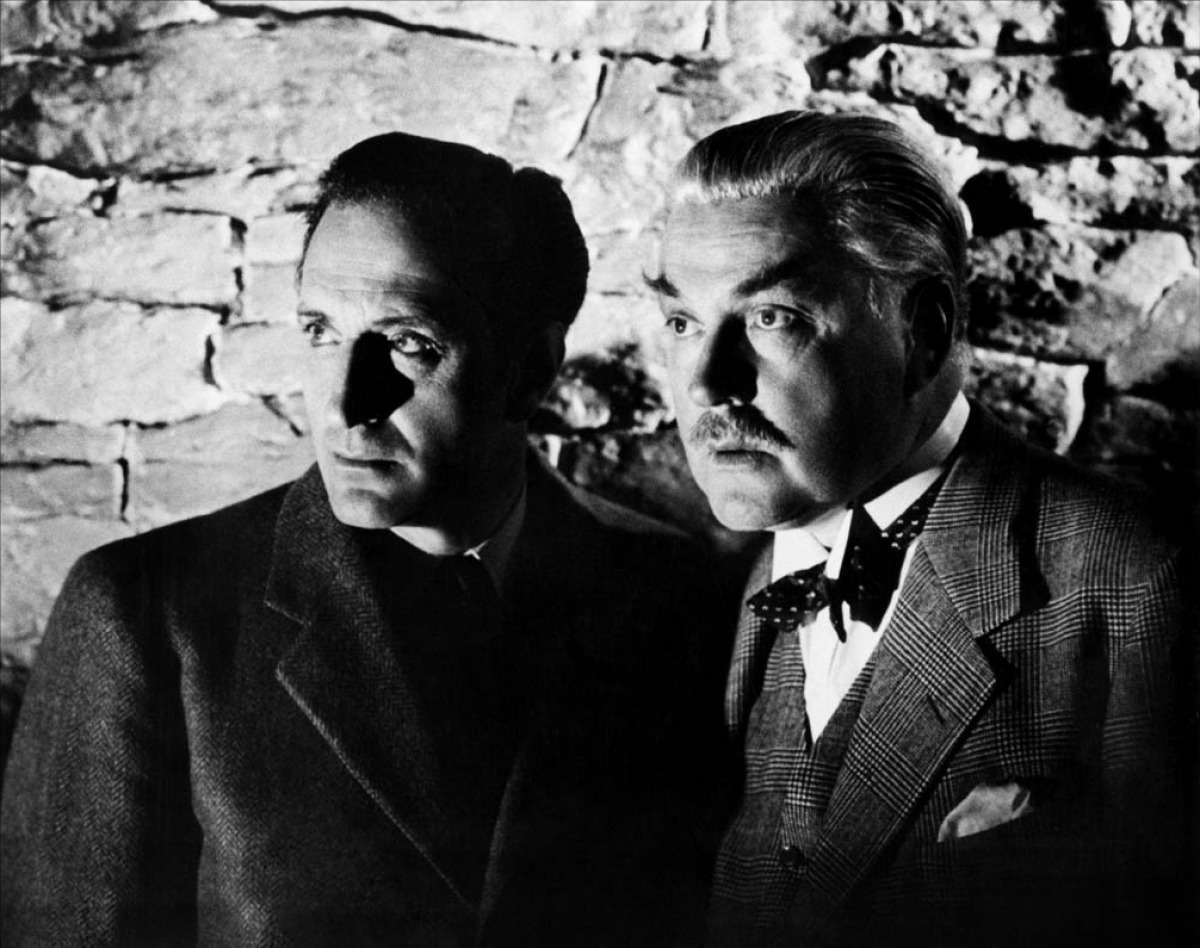
Basil Rathbone and Nigel Bruce in Sherlock Holmes and the Secret Weapon

A series of fourteen films based on Sir Arthur Conan Doyle's Sherlock Holmes stories was released between 1939 and 1946; the British actors Basil Rathbone and Nigel Bruce played Holmes and Dr. John Watson, respectively. After 20th Century-Fox released the first two films in the series in 1939, Universal Pictures acquired the rights from the Doyle estate and produced a further twelve films.

The two films from Fox had large budgets, high production values and were set in the Victorian era. Universal produced the series as B pictures with lower budgets and updated the films' settings to the then-present time of the Second World War, with Holmes fighting the Nazis. Both Rathbone and Bruce continued their roles when the series moved from Fox to Universal, as did Mary Gordon, who played the recurring character Mrs Hudson.

In the 1970s, four of the Universal-produced films fell into the public domain when their copyrights were not renewed. These four films were restored and colourised. Some of the films in the series had become degraded over time, with some of the original negatives lost and others suffering from nitrate deterioration because of the unstable cellulose nitrate film. The UCLA Film and Television Archive restored the series, putting the films onto modern polyester film, in a process that was jointly financed by UCLA, Warner Bros. and Hugh Hefner.

== Background ==
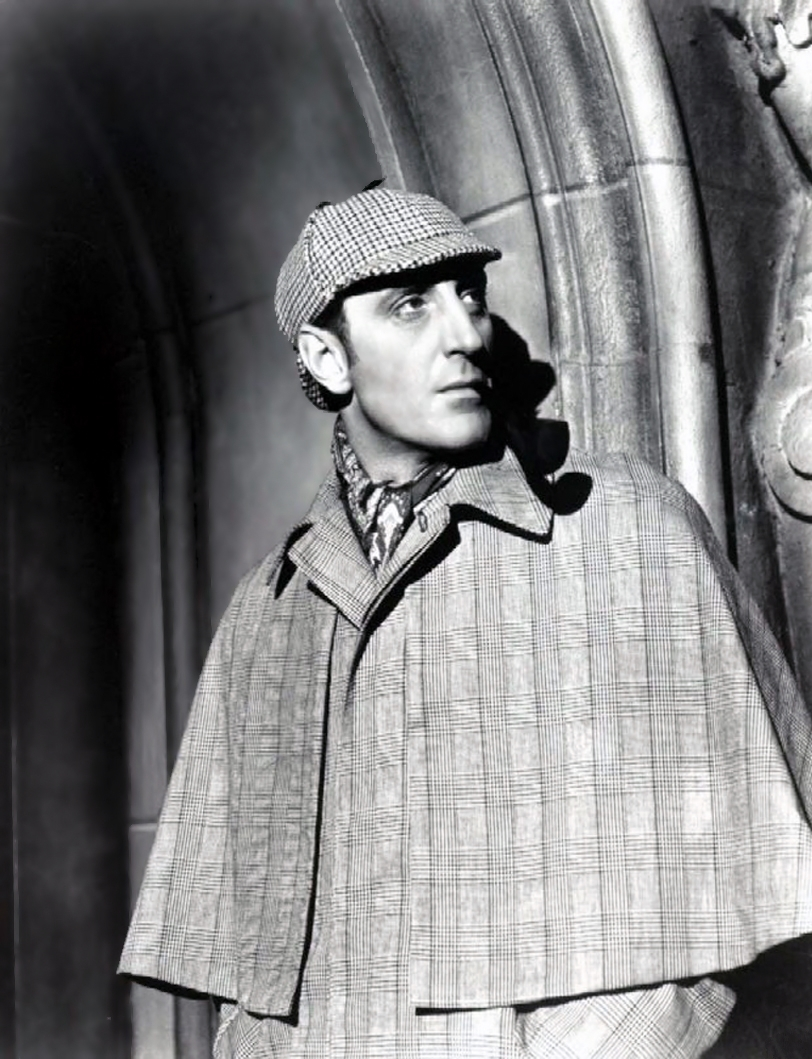
Basil Rathbone as Holmes

In 1938, Basil Rathbone was cast as Sherlock Holmes for the 20th Century-Fox adaptation of The Hound of the Baskervilles; Nigel Bruce was chosen to play Dr. John Watson. Darryl F. Zanuck, Gregory Ratoff and Gene Markey made the choice of Rathbone as Holmes during a conversation at a party in Hollywood. Filming began on 29 December 1938 under the direction of Sidney Lanfield and the film was released on 31 March 1939. Later that year a second film, The Adventures of Sherlock Holmes, followed, which was based on Sherlock Holmes, an 1899 stage play written by William Gillette. Although Fox planned to make further Holmes films with Rathbone and Bruce, complications in negotiations between the studio and the estate of the character's creator, Sir Arthur Conan Doyle, brought a premature end to the series; Fox's decision to withdraw from further productions was also because the Second World War meant that "foreign agents and spies were much more typical and topical than the antiquated criminal activities of Moriarty and the like". On 2 October 1939, a month after the release of Adventures, Rathbone and Bruce resumed their roles on radio, in The New Adventures of Sherlock Holmes, with episodes written by Dennis Green and Anthony Boucher. Rathbone left the radio series in May 1946, while Bruce remained until 1947, with Tom Conway replacing Rathbone.

In February 1942, following negotiations with the Doyle estate, Universal Pictures acquired the rights to the films and signed contracts with Rathbone and Bruce to continue their portrayals. Universal's deal—worth $300,000—was for seven years, and they purchased the rights to 21 stories in the canon in a contract that stipulated that the company had to make three films a year, of which two had to be adaptations of Doyle's stories. Universal was allowed to substantially revise the adaptations and modernise them, often to the point where little of the original story remained recognisable. Universal decided to update the stories to a Second World War setting, and the first film, Sherlock Holmes and the Voice of Terror—based on Doyle's 1917 story "His Last Bow"—was updated to a Second World War setting, with Holmes attempting to capture a Nazi agent. Rathbone and Bruce both initially objected to updating the setting of the stories. The change of era for Holmes is explained in the opening titles, with a caption that informs viewers that Holmes is "ageless, invincible and unchanging", going on to say that he was "solving significant problems of the present day".

While the Fox adaptations had high production values and larger budgets, the Universal films changed the approach of the series, and aimed "simply to be entertaining 'B' pictures". The second film produced by Universal, Sherlock Holmes and the Secret Weapon, was directed by Roy William Neill; he went on to direct the remaining ten films—and produce the final nine—in the Universal series.

Rathbone became frustrated with the role of Holmes and left the series in 1946; he stated that his "first picture was, as it were, a negative from which I merely continued to produce endless positives of the same photograph". Universal considered replacing him on screen with Tom Conway—as they subsequently did with the radio series—but instead decided to end the series, despite still having the rights for the next three years. In December 1946, shortly after the end of the series, Neill died of a heart attack.

== Cast ==
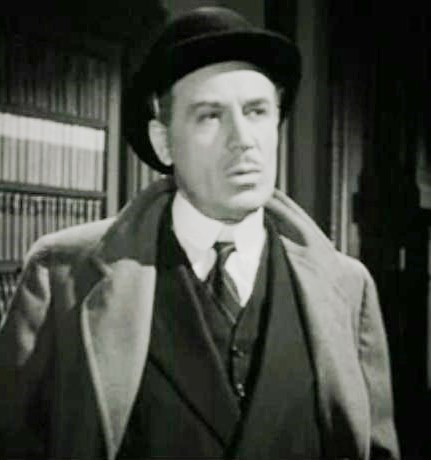
Dennis Hoey, as Inspector Lestrade in Sherlock Holmes and the Secret Weapon

The writer David Stuart Davies concluded that Basil Rathbone was "the actor who has come closest to creating the definitive Sherlock Holmes on screen", also describing the choice as "inspired". The historian Alan Barnes agrees, and wrote that "Rathbone was Sherlock Holmes". The choice of Nigel Bruce as Watson was more contentious, with Davies pointing out that "Bruce's characterisation bore little relation" to the written Watson, even though the portrayal eventually produced "an endearingly avuncular figure". The historian David Parkinson agrees, and wrote that Bruce's "avuncular presence provided the perfect counterbalance to Rathbone's briskly omniscient sleuth". Barnes notes that, despite the criticisms against him, Bruce rehabilitated Watson, who had been a marginal figure in the cinematic Holmes canon to that point: "after Bruce, it would be a near-unthinkable heresy to show Holmes without him". With the combination of Rathbone and Bruce, the historian Jim Harmon considered that this was "near perfect casting".

The series included continuity of two actors playing recurring characters: Mary Gordon, who played Mrs. Hudson, and Dennis Hoey, who portrayed Inspector Lestrade. Other recurring characters were played by numerous actors, with Professor Moriarty being played by three people: Lionel Atwill in Sherlock Holmes and the Secret Weapon, Henry Daniell in The Woman in Green and George Zucco in The Adventures of Sherlock Holmes. (Note: All three actors also played other roles in the series. Atwill also played: * Dr. James Mortimer in The Hound of the Baskervilles Daniell also played: * Sir Anthony Lloyd in Sherlock Holmes and the Voice of Terror * William Easter in Sherlock Holmes in Washington Zucco also played: * Richard Stanley (aka Heinrich Hinkle) in Sherlock Holmes in Washington) Some supporting actors reappeared in a number of roles in what Davies called the series' "own little repertory company of actors"; these included Harry Cording, who played seven roles in different films, (Note: Cording played: * Camberwell in Sherlock Holmes and the Voice of Terror * Jack Brady in Sherlock Holmes and the Secret Weapon * Fred Garvin in The Spider Woman * George Gelder in The Pearl of Death * Captain Jack Simpson in The House of Fear * Mock in Terror by Night * Hamid in Dressed to Kill) and Gerald Hamer and Harold De Becker, who both played four roles, (Note: Hamer played: * Major Langford in Sherlock Holmes Faces Death * Potts/Tanner/Ramson in The Scarlet Claw * Kingston in Pursuit to Algiers * Mr. Shallcross in Terror by Night De Becker played: * Peg Leg in Sherlock Holmes and the Secret Weapon * Pub proprietor in Sherlock Holmes Faces Death * Boss in The Pearl of Death * Shabby man in The Woman in Green) among others.

== Complete film list ==
Film sequence
Title	Release	Director	Based on (by Sir Arthur Conan Doyle unless stated)	Plot	Ref.
The Hound of the Baskervilles	31 March 1939	Sidney Lanfield	The Hound of the Baskervilles (1901–02)	Holmes and Watson are consulted about the arrival in England of Sir Henry Baskerville, the last of the Baskervilles, heir to the family estate on Dartmoor, following the death of Sir Henry's uncle. A local myth surrounds the Baskervilles that a vicious hound stalks the descendants of the family. Holmes sends Watson to Baskerville Hall while he assumes the disguise of a peddler. Holmes reveals his identity to Watson and the two witness the death of an escaped convict, killed by a large hound. Holmes and Watson declare the case closed and claim that they are leaving Baskerville Hall; they return to the moor that night and kill the dog as it attacks Sir Henry. Holmes then unmasks the killer as Jack Stapleton, who was a Baskerville and hoped to claim the fortune and title for himself.	
The Adventures of Sherlock Holmes	1 September 1939	Alfred L. Werker	Sherlock Holmes (1899) by William Gillette and Conan Doyle	After Professor Moriarty is acquitted of murder, Holmes and Watson are visited by Ann Brandon, who tells the detectives that her brother Lloyd has received a strange note—a drawing of a man with an albatross hanging around his neck—identical to one received by her father just before his murder ten years previously: her brother is killed later that day. Holmes believes an attempt will be made on Ann's life and he disguises himself as a music hall entertainer for a garden party, where he captures her assailant. The assassin is Gabriel Mateo, out for revenge on the Brandons for the murder of his father by Ann's father in a dispute over ownership of their South American mine; Mateo reveals that it was Moriarty who urged him to seek revenge. Holmes realises Moriarty was using Ann's attempted murder as a distraction from his real crime: an attempt to steal the Crown Jewels. Holmes goes to the Tower of London where Moriarty is masquerading as a policeman. The pair struggle, and Moriarty falls, presumably to his death.	
Sherlock Holmes and the Voice of Terror	18 September 1942	John Rawlins	"His Last Bow" (1917)	During the Second World War, Holmes is consulted by the British Inner Council to capture a Nazi agent who broadcasts under the name the "Voice of Terror", and who appears to be running a sabotage ring in England. After Gavin, one of his underworld contacts, is killed on his doorstep, Holmes convinces Kitty—Gavin's wife—to find out the meaning of a clue Gavin had uncovered. She does so, and manages to inveigle her way into the house of Meade, the main Nazi agent in the ring. After being given a tip-off from Kitty, Holmes takes the Inner Council to an abandoned church on the coast of southern England, where they thwart a German invasion. Holmes then uncovers the mole in the council, Sir Evan Barham, head of the council and the German spy Heinrich von Bork, who had been posing as Barham for the previous twenty years.	
Sherlock Holmes and the Secret Weapon	12 February 1943	Roy William Neill	"The Adventure of the Dancing Men" (1903)	A disguised Holmes helps Swiss scientist Dr Tobel to escape from Gestapo kidnappers and flee to England with his revolutionary bombsight. Without telling Holmes or Watson, Tobel splits his bombsight into four parts and leaves a part each with four Swiss scientists also living in London. Shortly afterwards, he is kidnapped by Professor Moriarty, who is working with the Nazis; a coded note giving details of the scientists that was left for Holmes was also taken by Moriarty. Holmes discovers tracings of the note and decodes it, but three of the scientists had already been killed. Holmes takes the place of the fourth scientist and allows himself to be kidnapped by Moriarty's men. Moriarty tries to kill Holmes by exsanguination, but Watson and Inspector Lestrade rescue the detective. As Moriarty tries to escape he falls through a trapdoor, seemingly to his death.	
Sherlock Holmes in Washington	30 April 1943	Roy William Neill	Original storyline	A British courier is carrying top secret papers that he had put onto microfilm and inserted into a matchbook; realising he is being pursued by Nazi agents, he drops the matches into a handbag of the socialite Nancy Partridge, a fellow passenger. He is subsequently kidnapped and killed and Holmes is instructed to find his killers and the missing document. On his arrival in Washington, Holmes soon realises that Partridge has the document. The Nazi agents, led by William Easter, have also come to the same conclusion and kidnapped her. Holmes tracks her down to an antique shop and meets the owner, whom he recognises as a German agent from the First World War. Holmes, Watson and the police subsequently round up Easter and the gang, and obtain the microfilmed documents.	
Sherlock Holmes Faces Death	17 September 1943	Roy William Neill	"The Adventure of the Musgrave Ritual" (1893)	Watson is the doctor in charge of an army hospital at Musgrave Manor in Northumberland; when his assistant, Dr. Bob Sexton, is attacked, Watson asks Holmes for help. On their arrival they find the body of Geoffrey Musgrave, head of the family. The following day Geoffrey's young sister Sally performs the "Musgrave Ritual", which passes the house and estate to her elder brother Phillip. Holmes questions the butler, Alfred Brunton, who is subsequently dismissed for drunkenness. The next day Phillip Musgrave is murdered and Inspector Lestrade suspects the butler for the crime, although the butler is now missing. Holmes realises that the key to the mystery may be in the text of the Musgrave Ritual, which contains oblique references to chess moves. Holmes decodes the ritual, using the staff and patients of the house as chess pieces to play a game on the chequered floor of the main hall. He deduces that the ritual refers to a cellar below the hall: on examining the area he finds the body of the missing butler. Holmes poses as the Butler's corpse, and tricks Sexton into unveiling himself as the murderer. Holmes explains that Sexton had found a land grant and was murdering the family in order to gain the benefits.	
The Spider Woman	21 January 1944	Roy William Neill	"The Adventure of the Dying Detective" (1913), The Sign of the Four (1890) and "The Final Problem" (1893)	A series of similar suicides take place in London while Holmes is on holiday in Scotland; shortly after complaining to Watson about his health, Holmes collapses into a ravine and is missing, presumed dead. In reality Holmes has faked his own death to try and track down the gang behind what he believes are murders, conducted by a "female Moriarty". Seeing that the common connection between the deaths is a life insurance scheme, Holmes disguises himself as Rajni Singh, an Indian officer who has lost heavily on the gambling tables and is in disgrace: he is approached by Adrea Spedding, the leader of the gang, who tells him that he can borrow money using his insurance policy. She sees through Holmes's disguise and attempts to kill him using a poisonous spider whose venom causes such excruciating pain that the victims kill themselves. Holmes and Watson visit the leading arachnologist Matthew Ordway to see who has purchased the spiders recently, but Holmes deduces that the man is an imposter. The imposter escapes and Holmes and Watson find Ordway's body in the house. They trace the villains to a fairground where, despite an attempt on Holmes's life, the gang are arrested.	
The Scarlet Claw	26 May 1944	Roy William Neill	Original storyline	Following the death of Lady Lillian Penrose in a small Canadian village, Holmes investigates, despite the locals blaming the murder on a glowing, murderous phantom. Holmes establishes that Lady Penrose was Lillian Gentry, a former actress who had left acting after one of her fellow actors committed a murder. Further investigation and deduction from Holmes shows that an ex-judge also lives in the town: he had overseen the case of the murderer. The local hotel owner was a former prison guard who also knew the killer. After the judge and hotel owner's daughter are also killed, Holmes sets a trap for the murderer, who had been living in the village for the previous two years disguised as a postman. The murderer also tries to kill Holmes, but fails, before running off into the fog, where the hotel owner finds and kills him in revenge.	
The Pearl of Death	22 September 1944	Roy William Neill	The Adventure of the Six Napoleons (1904)	On board a ship to England, a courier for the Royal Regent Museum is robbed of the Borgia Pearl by Naomi Drake. She hides the pearl in a camera and persuades a clergyman to carry the camera through customs. The clergyman is Holmes in disguise and he removes the pearl and takes it to the museum. When the pearl is displayed Holmes tests the security system and manages to disable it: while he does so, the pearl is stolen by Giles Conover, Drake's criminal partner. Conover is chased by museum staff, but manages to hide the pearl before he is captured. He is released shortly afterwards for lack of evidence. A number of related murders then follow, where the victims have their backs broken and their china and crockery smashed. Holmes establishes that the murders were committed by the Hoxton Creeper; Holmes and Watson examine the smashed crockery and discover that each victim owned a bust of Napoleon. Holmes visits the makers of the busts, near the museum, and realises that Conover hid the pearl in one of the busts before he was arrested. After getting a list of the owners of the busts, Holmes takes the place of the final owner and confronts Conover. Holmes tricks the Hoxton Creeper into killing Conover, before shooting the Creeper in self-defence.	
The House of Fear	16 March 1945	Roy William Neill	"The Five Orange Pips" (1891)	When members of the Good Comrades club start being killed, Holmes is called to their Scottish mansion to investigate. Before a victim is killed, he receives an envelope with orange pips. After each death, the life insurance of the victim is shared between the survivors. In all cases the identification is difficult, with the victims only identified by items of clothing or, in one case, a tattoo. Inspector Lestrade receives a note from a local shopkeeper, who says he has a clue. When Lestrade, Holmes and Watson visit, they find the shopkeeper killed. Holmes exhumes one of the graves and find the coffin empty. They return to the mansion and find a sixth member has been murdered and the sole surviving member, Bruce Alastair, arrested. Watson goes missing shortly afterwards and Holmes and Lestrade locate a hidden tunnel which leads to an old smugglers' cave: inside they find the six missing members of the club who had all faked their deaths in order to cash in on the life insurance, using the corpses of recently dead villagers.	
The Woman in Green	15 June 1945	Roy William Neill	"The Adventure of the Empty House" (1903)	Holmes and Watson are consulted by Inspector Gregson of Scotland Yard to assist with the "finger murders", where young women have been murdered and one of their fingers have been removed. Holmes and Gregson see Sir George Fenwick at Pembroke House with an attractive woman, Lydia Marlowe. The couple leave and Fenwick is drugged and later wakes to find another murder has been committed and that the finger is in his pocket. He returns to Marlowe's flat where he meets Professor Moriarty, who blackmails him. The following day Fenwicke is found killed, clutching a matchbook from Pembroke House. After an attempt on Holmes's life by a hypnotised former soldier, Holmes and Watson visit the Mesmer Club, whose members are all interested in hypnotism. Marlowe also visits the club and lures Holmes back to her flat where she hypnotises him. Moriarty instructs the hypnotised Holmes to write a suicide note and leads him to the terrace in order that the detective should commit suicide. Watson and the police raid the flat and Holmes reveals that he was not hypnotised after all. As he is being arrested, Moriarty tries to jump to the building next door, but instead falls, apparently to his death.	
Pursuit to Algiers	26 October 1945	Roy William Neill	Original storyline	Following the assassination of King Stephan of Rovinia, Holmes and Watson are engaged by that country's Prime Minister to assist with the passage of Prince Nikolas of Rovinia from his school in Britain to Algiers, where Rovianian agents can take him the rest of the way. The first stage of the journey is supposed to be for Holmes, Watson and the Prince to travel by aeroplane, but when they arrive at the airfield, their plane has been swapped for a smaller version and Watson is unable to travel with them. Holmes instructs him to act as a decoy by travelling by liner. On board Watson hears the news that Holmes's plane has crashed and he believes Holmes dead; shortly afterwards he treats one of the passengers who reveals himself to be Holmes, travelling with the prince. A number of the passengers are suspicious, including a singer, Sheila Woodbury, who Holmes deduces is carrying the recently stolen Duchess of Brookdale's emeralds. When the liner docks in Lisbon, it is joined by three men, who try to kill Holmes and abduct the Prince, but Holmes foils all their attempts. When the ship docks at Alexandria the men surprise Holmes, tying him up and abducting the prince. When Holmes is discovered by Watson and the Prime Minister of Rovinia, he informs them that the prince had been acting as their steward for the journey, and that the men had abducted an imposter he had put in place: he had also arranged for the local police to arrest the trio when they disembarked.	
Terror by Night	1 February 1946	Roy William Neill	Original storyline	Holmes and Watson are hired by Ronald Carstairs and his mother Lady Margaret to protect the Star of Rhodesia diamond on a train trip from London to Scotland. Also on the train is Inspector Lestrade of Scotland Yard, providing official protection for the jewel. Watson arrives late for the train, bringing with him a member of his club, Major Duncan-Bleek. While Holmes, Watson and Duncan-Bleek are dining, Carstairs is murdered and the diamond stolen. Holmes examines a coffin in the baggage carriage; the coffin carries the body of the mother of Vivian Vedder, one of the passengers. Holmes discovers a secret compartment in the coffin, large enough to hold a man. When questioned, Vedder admits that she was paid to transport the coffin. Holmes admits that he had previously swapped the real diamond for a copy: he gives the real diamond to Lestrade for safe keeping. Holmes and Watson return to the baggage carriage and find the conductor murdered by a poison dart. Duncan-Bleek is joined by Sands, the murderer who had previously hidden in the coffin; Duncan-Bleek tells him that Lestrade has the jewel and instructs him to obtain it. Sands knocks Lestrade unconscious and steals the diamond, but he is murdered by Duncan-Bleek in the process. The train picks up a group of policemen. Holmes informs them that Duncan-Bleek is really Moran. Moran is arrested and the diamond discovered. Just as he is about to be taken off the train, Moran steals a policeman's gun; the lights in the carriage go off and there is a scuffle. When the lights come on, Moran is being led from the train with a jacket over his head. Holmes tells Watson that the police were Moran's accomplices. He goes on to say that Moran is handcuffed under the table, and that the false policemen had taken Lestrade, who later arrests the men.	
Dressed to Kill	7 June 1946	Roy William Neill	Original storyline	Watson is visited by Julian "Stinky" Emery, an old friend, who tells him and Holmes of a strange robbery in his house—the theft of a cheap music box from his collection. Holmes listens to a similar cheap box which Emery had purchased. That night Emery is murdered and the music box is stolen. Holmes establishes that the music box was one of three identical boxes sold in an auction, all of which had been made in Dartmoor Prison. Holmes visits the second purchaser, only to find the box has just been stolen. He visits the third seller shortly before the murderers also visit: he takes the box with him and deduces that the tunes all differ slightly, and they contain a coded message to the location of stolen property. While an attempt is made on Holmes's life, the final box is stolen from Watson. While Holmes escapes from his trap, he and Watson finally crack the code and go to Samuel Johnson's house, where they capture the criminals and obtain the printing plates for the £5 note.	

== Colour versions and restoration ==
Split-screen showing restored (left) and pre-restored (right) image from The House of Fear.

Four of the films—Sherlock Holmes and the Secret Weapon, The Woman in Green, Terror by Night and Dressed to Kill—are in the public domain. In 2006 the four films were digitally restored and computer colourised by Legend Films, who released the colour and black and white films on DVDs.

The two 20th Century Fox films—The Hound of the Baskervilles and The Adventures of Sherlock Holmes—had survived complete and in good condition, but those in the Universal series suffered badly over the years, as they passed through the hands of different copyright owners. In 1993 the UCLA Film and Television Archive started a restoration project on the series after the unstable cellulose nitrate film was found to be suffering from deterioration. Restoration on the first six films—The Woman in Green, The Pearl of Death, Sherlock Holmes and the Secret Weapon, The Scarlet Claw, Terror by Night and The Spider Woman—took four years from 1993; the costs for the restoration were met by UCLA and Hugh Hefner, who was a fan of the Rathbone-Holmes series. From 1998 Warner Bros. matched Hefner's funding and the remaining six films—Dressed to Kill, Pursuit to Algiers, Sherlock Holmes Faces Death, The House of Fear, Sherlock Holmes and the Voice of Terror and Sherlock Holmes in Washington—were then restored, a process that was completed in 2001.

The restoration involved transferring the films onto modern polyester film and restoring the images frame-by-frame. The process was complicated by the poor quality of some of the films. Robert Gitt, the UCLA Preservation Officer, commented that "the copies of the films that survive are many generations removed from the original and flaws have been photographed and re-photographed into these copies". The Scarlet Claw and Pursuit to Algiers were both in very poor condition and Dressed to Kill was missing some 35mm reels. This being the case, the restorers had to blow up some 16mm prints to replace the scenes.

== Notes and references ==
=== Sources ===
- Barnes, Alan (2011). Sherlock Holmes on Screen: The Complete Screen History. London: Titan Books. ISBN 978-0-8576-8776-0.
- Boström, Mattias (2018). From Holmes to Sherlock. Mysterious Press. ISBN 978-0-8021-2789-1.
- Davies, David Stuart (1976). Holmes of the Movies: The Screen Career of Sherlock Holmes. London: New English Library. ISBN 978-0-4500-3358-2.
- Gitt, Robert (2003). "Restoring Sherlock Holmes Featurette". The Pearl of Death (DVD). MPI Media Group.
- Hardy, Phil, ed. (1997). The BFI Companion to Crime. London: Continuum. ISBN 978-0-304-33215-1.
- Harmon, Jim (2003). Radio Mystery and Adventure and Its Appearances in Film, Television and Other Media. Jefferson, NC: McFarland & Company. ISBN 978-0-7864-8508-6.
- Langman, Larry; Finn, Daniel (1995a). A Guide to American Crime Films of the Thirties. Westport, CT: Greenwood Publishing Group. ISBN 0-313-29532-8.
- Langman, Larry; Finn, Daniel (1995b). A Guide to American Crime Films of the Forties and Fifties. Westport, CT: Greenwood Publishing Group. ISBN 0-313-29265-5.
- Marks, Jeffrey (2008). Anthony Boucher: A Biobibliography. Jefferson, NC: McFarland & Company. ISBN 978-0-7864-8388-4.
- Parkinson, David (2004). "Bruce, (William) Nigel Ernle (1895–1953)". Oxford Dictionary of National Biography (online ed.). Oxford University Press. doi:10.1093/ref:odnb/57390. (Subscription, Wikipedia Library access or UK public library membership required.)
- Sherlock Holmes and the Secret Weapon (DVD). MPI Media Group.
- Sherlock Holmes and the Voice of Terror (DVD). MPI Media Group.
