= Sidney Lanfield =

American film director

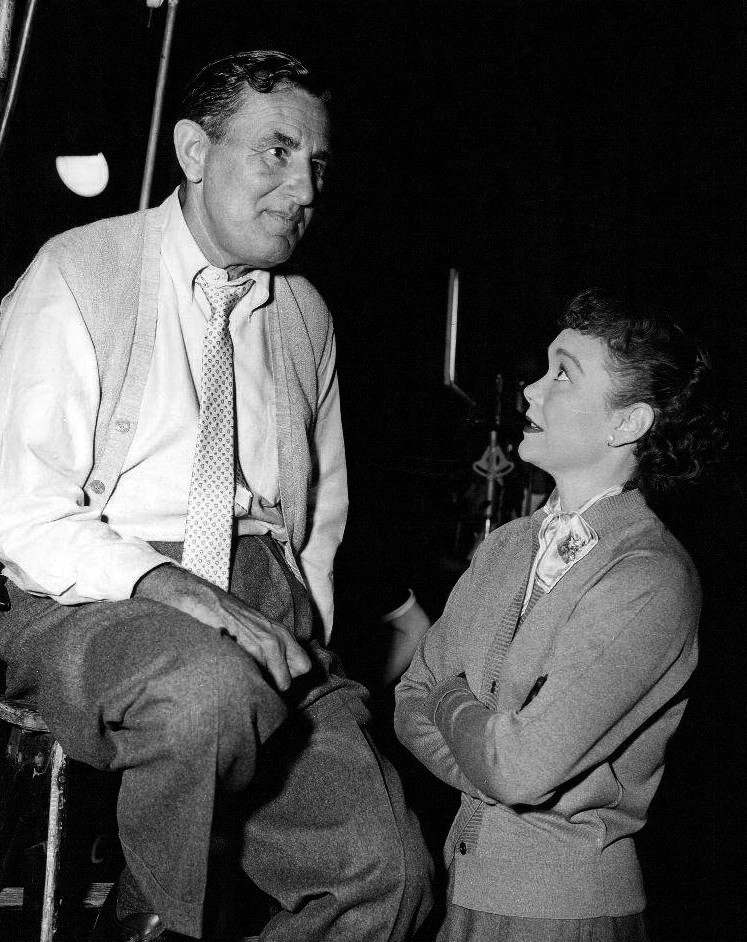
- Lanfield and Jane Wyman confer on the set of The Jane Wyman Show, 1955
- Born: April 20, 1898
- Died: June 20, 1972 (aged 74)
- Resting place: Westwood Memorial Park, Los Angeles, California
- Spouse: Shirley Mason (1927–1972)

Sidney Ivanovich Lanfield (April 20, 1898 – June 20, 1972) was an American film director known for directing romances and light comedy films and later television programs.

The one-time jazz musician and vaudevillian star started his first directing job for the Fox Film Corporation in 1930; he went on to direct a number of films for 20th Century Fox. In 1941, he directed the Fred Astaire film You'll Never Get Rich for Columbia Pictures, then moved to Paramount Pictures. There Lanfield worked on a number of film comedies. He is probably best remembered for directing actor Bob Hope in a number of films including My Favorite Blonde (1942), Let's Face It (1943), Where There's Life (1947), and The Lemon Drop Kid (1951). Lanfield's most profitable film, however, was the first teaming of Basil Rathbone and Nigel Bruce as Sherlock Holmes and Dr. Watson in 1939's The Hound of the Baskervilles.

In the early 1950s the reputedly strict taskmaster-director moved to television where his vaudeville and comic background in films were put to use in television comedies including Where's Raymond?, McHale's Navy and The Addams Family.

Lanfield was married to film actress Shirley Mason from 1927 until his death in 1972. He is interred in the Westwood Village Memorial Park Cemetery in Los Angeles. Lanfield was also known as Sidney Landfield.

== Selected filmography ==
- Don't Marry (1928)
- Broadway Bad (1933)
- Red Salute (1935)
- King of Burlesque (1936)
- Sing, Baby, Sing (1936)
- Love and Hisses (1937)
- The Hound of the Baskervilles (1939)
- Second Fiddle (1939)
- Swanee River (1939)
- The Lady Has Plans (1942)
- Standing Room Only (1944)
- Station West (1948)
- The Lemon Drop Kid (1951)
- Skirts Ahoy! (1952)
