= Dennis Hoey =

English actor (1893–1960)

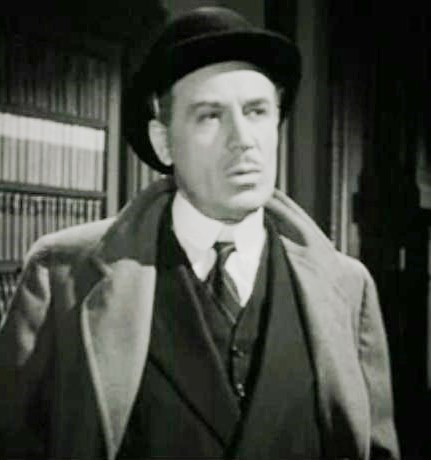
- Hoey as Inspector Lestrade in Sherlock Holmes and the Secret Weapon (1942)
- Born: Samuel David Hyams; 30 March 1893; London, England
- Died: 25 July 1960 (aged 67); Palm Beach, Florida, U.S.
- Resting place: Myrtle Hill Memorial Park, Tampa, Florida
- Occupation: Actor
- Years active: 1924–1952
- Spouses: Josephine Marta Ricca (m. 1933; div. 1946): Sarah Pearl Lyons
- Children: 1

Dennis Hoey (born Samuel David Hyams, 30 March 1893 – 25 July 1960) was a British film and stage actor, best remembered for playing Inspector Lestrade in six films of Universal's Sherlock Holmes series.

== Early life ==
Hoey was born Samuel David Hyams in London to Ellis and Leah (Green) Hyams, both of Russian Jewish descent, who ran a bed and breakfast in Brighton, East Sussex.

Hoey received his formal education at Brighton College, and originally planned to be a teacher. He served in the British Army during World War I. After a career as a singer, which included entertaining British troops during his war service, he moved into theatre-acting in 1918, and later into cinema films. In 1931, Hoey moved to the United States and commenced a career in Hollywood.

== Film ==
Hoey's first film was Tell England. He is best known for playing Inspector Lestrade in six Universal's Sherlock Holmes series. He also portrayed the master of Harrow in The Foxes of Harrow and appeared in Tarzan and the Leopard Woman.

He came to Australia to star in Uncivilised (1936).

== Stage ==
Hoey "appeared frequently in London" stage productions, including those of Sydney Carroll's Shakespearean repertory company. He played Mr. Rochester opposite Katharine Hepburn in the American production of Helen Jerome's stage adaptation of Jane Eyre. He also wrote a play called The Haven and toured in it in 1946 with Melville Cooper, Valerie Cossart and Viola Roache.

Hoey's Broadway credits include Hassan (1924), Katja (1926–1927), Green Waters (1936), Virginia (1937), Empress of Destiny (1938), The Circle (1938), Lorelei (1938), The Burning Deck (1940), Heart of a City (1942), The Haven (1946), and Getting Married (1951).

== Radio ==
On radio, Hoey played Mr. Welby in Pretty Kitty Kelly on CBS.

== Personal life ==
Issue No. 45 of Films of the Golden Age (magazine) features an interview with Hoey's son, Michael (1934–2014), who extensively discusses his father's life and career. In Michael's book, Elvis, Sherlock and Me: How I Survived Growing Up in Hollywood (Bear Manor Media-2007), he discusses his father's career and their sometimes turbulent relationship.

== Death ==
Hoey died at the age of 67 in Palm Beach, Florida, of kidney disease on 25 July 1960. His body was buried at Myrtle Hill Memorial Park cemetery, in Tampa, Florida.

== Filmography ==
- Tip Toes (1927) as Hotelier (film debut)
- The Man from Chicago (1930) as Jimmy Donovan
- Tell England (1931) as The Padre
- Never Trouble Trouble (1931) as Stranger
- Love Lies (1932) as Cyrus Watt
- Life Goes On (1932) as Anthony Carlisle
- The Maid of the Mountains (1932) as Orsino
- Baroud (1933) as Captain Sabry
- The Good Companions (1933) as Joe Brundit
- The Wandering Jew (1933) as Lord de Beaudricourt
- Maid Happy (1933) as Sir Rudolph Bartlett
- Facing the Music (1933) as Capradossi
- My Old Duchess (1934) as Montagu Neilson
- Lily of Killarney (1934) as Miles-Na-Copaleen
- Chu Chin Chow (1934) as Rakham, chief henchman
- I Spy (1934) as MNT
- Jew Süss (1934) as Dieterle
- Brewster's Millions (1935) as Mario
- Immortal Gentleman (1935) as Soldier/Toby Belch
- Honeymoon for Three (1935) as Mons Daumery
- The Tunnel (1935) as Worker (uncredited)
- The Mystery of the Mary Celeste (1935) as Tom Goodschard
- Maria Marten, or The Murder in the Red Barn (1935) as Gambling Winner
- Black Roses (1935) as Nikander
- Uncivilised (1937) as Mara the White Chief
- A Yank in the R.A.F. (1941) as Intelligence Officer
- Confirm or Deny (1941) as Duffield, Ministry of Information
- Son of Fury: The Story of Benjamin Blake (1942) as Lord Tarrant
- This Above All (1942) as Parsons
- Cairo (1942) as Colonel Woodhue
- Sherlock Holmes and the Secret Weapon (1942) as Inspector Lestrade
- Forever and a Day (1943) as Mover
- Frankenstein Meets the Wolf Man (1943) as Inspector Owen
- They Came to Blow Up America (1943) as Col. Taeger
- Bomber's Moon (1943) as Colonel von Grunow
- Sherlock Holmes Faces Death (1943) as Inspector Lestrade
- The Spider Woman (1944) as Inspector Lestrade
- Uncertain Glory (1944) as Father Le Clerc
- The Pearl of Death (1944) as Inspector Lestrade
- National Velvet (1944) as Mr. Greenford
- The Keys of the Kingdom (1944) as Alec Chisholm (uncredited)
- Sherlock Holmes and the House of Fear (1945) as Inspector Lestrade
- A Thousand and One Nights (1945) as Sultan Kamar Al-Kir/Prince Hadji
- Kitty (1945) as Mr. Jonathan Selby
- Tarzan and the Leopard Woman (1946) as Commissioner
- Terror by Night (1946) as Inspector Lestrade
- She-Wolf of London (1946) as Inspector Pierce
- Anna and the King of Siam (1946) as Sir Edward
- Roll on Texas Moon (1946) as Cole Gregory
- The Strange Woman (1946) as Tim Hager
- The Crimson Key (1947) as Steven Loring
- Second Chance (1947) as Roger Elwood
- Golden Earrings (1947) as Hoff
- The Foxes of Harrow (1947) as Master of Harrow
- Christmas Eve (1947) as Williams-Butler
- Where There's Life (1947) as Minister of War Grubitch
- If Winter Comes (1947) as Tiny Wilson
- Ruthless (1948) as Mr. Burnside
- Joan of Arc (1948) as Sir William Glasdale
- Wake of the Red Witch (1948) as Captain Munsey
- Bad Men of Tombstone (1949) as Mr. Smith
- The Secret Garden (1949) as Mr. Pitcher
- The Kid from Texas (1950) as Major Harper
- The Adventures of Ellery Queen (1950, TV) as Ronny Sinclair
- David and Bathsheba (1951) as Joab
- Caribbean Gold (1952) as Burford
- Plymouth Adventure (1952) as Head Constable (final film, uncredited)
- Omnibus (1956, TV) as Arthur Conan Doyle

== Stage ==
- Hassan (1924), Masrur
- Katja (1926), Ivo
- Green Waters (1936), Ian McRuvie
- Jane Eyre (1936), Mr. Rochester
- Virginia (1937), Sir Guy Carleton
- Empress of Destiny (1938), Potemkin
- The Circle (1938), Lord Porteous
- Lorelei (1938), Reprecht Eisenkranz
- The Burning Deck (1940), Captain Applegate
- Heart of a City (1942), Leo Saddle
- The Haven (1946), Edmund Durward
- Getting Married (1951), The General
