= Sherlock Holmes and the Secret Weapon =

1942 film by Roy William Neill

- US theatrical poster
- Directed by: Roy William Neill
- Written by: W. Scott Darling; Edward T. Lowe Jr.
- Screenplay by: Edmund L. Hartmann
- Based on: The Adventure of the Dancing Men; 1903 short story by Sir Arthur Conan Doyle
- Produced by: Howard Benedict
- Starring: Basil Rathbone; Nigel Bruce; Lionel Atwill
- Cinematography: Lester White
- Edited by: Otto Ludwig
- Music by: Frank Skinner
- Production company: Universal Pictures
- Distributed by: Universal Pictures
- Release dates: December 25, 1942 (Los Angeles, California); February 12, 1943 (United States)
- Running time: 68 minutes (restored version)
- Country: United States
- Language: English
- Budget: $200,000

External videos
- Sherlock Holmes and the Secret Weapon Trailer at TCM Movie Database

Sherlock Holmes and the Secret Weapon

Sherlock Holmes and the Secret Weapon (1942) is the fourth in the Basil Rathbone/Nigel Bruce series of 14 Sherlock Holmes films, which updated the characters created by Sir Arthur Conan Doyle to the then-present day. The film is credited as an adaptation of Conan Doyle's 1903 short story "The Adventure of the Dancing Men", though the only element from the source material is the dancing men code. Rather, it is a spy film taking place on the background of the then-ongoing Second World War with an original premise. The film concerns the kidnapping of a Swiss scientist by their nemesis Professor Moriarty to steal a new bomb sight and sell it to Nazi Germany. Sherlock Holmes and Dr. John Watson have to crack a secret code to save the country.

The film is one of four films in the series that are in the public domain.

== Plot ==
Sherlock Holmes (Basil Rathbone) pretends to be a Nazi spy to aid scientist Dr. Franz Tobel (William Post Jr.) and his new invention, a bombsight, in escaping a Gestapo trap in Switzerland. Holmes and Franz fly to London, where Holmes places him under the protection of his friend, Dr. Watson (Nigel Bruce). The scientist slips away against Holmes' instructions for a secret reunion with his fiancée, Charlotte Eberli (Kaaren Verne), and gives her an envelope containing a coded message. He tells Charlotte to give it to Holmes if anything should happen to him. The German spies' attempt to abduct Tobel as he leaves Charlotte's apartment is foiled by a passing London bobby.

Tobel successfully demonstrates the bombsight for Sir Reginald Bailey (Holmes Herbert) and observers from Bomber Command. Tobel, now under the protection of Inspector Lestrade (Dennis Hoey) and Scotland Yard, tells Sir Reginald that although willing to provide the British with his bombsight, only he will know its secret and has a complex plan for its manufacture to keep the secret safe. He separates his invention into four parts and gives one to each of four Swiss scientists, known only to him and not to each other, to construct separately. Soon after, Holmes receives a call from Lestrade telling him that Tobel has disappeared. Holmes goes to Charlotte's flat, where he receives Tobel's envelope. Rather than the coded message, the message inside is from Holmes' nemesis, master criminal Professor Moriarty (Lionel Atwill), who is now working for the Germans.

Disguising himself as Ram Singh, one of Moriarty's old henchmen, Holmes searches the Soho district for information. He encounters two henchmen Peg Leg (Harold De Becker) and Jack Brady (Harry Cording), but is captured by Moriarty. Holmes is put into the false bottom of a sea chest, but is rescued when Watson and Lestrade observe the henchmen struggling with its unusual weight. Holmes returns to Charlotte's flat to search for clues to the message's contents. He finds impressions of the message left on a notepad page by immersing it in "fluorescent salts... and then photograph(ing) it by ultraviolet light." Holmes breaks the first three lines of a cunningly modified substitution cipher, which are the identities and locations of three of the scientists, but cannot break the fourth line, which has been altered as an added precaution. He soon learns that Moriarty has murdered all three scientists and stolen their parts. Meanwhile, Moriarty, also unable to break the fourth line, tortures Tobel for the name of the fourth scientist. Holmes deduces the change in the code and breaks the fourth line, identifying the scientist as Professor Frederick Hoffner (Henry Victor).

Moriarty accidentally deciphers the code. He sends agents to abduct Hoffner, who has the brilliance to put the four parts together should Tobel not recover from torture. The German agents bring the scientist, who is actually Holmes in disguise again, to Moriarty's seemingly undetectable stronghold. Unknown to Moriarty, Holmes had the real Hoffner attach an apparatus to their car that drips luminous paint (which Watson helped prepare) at regular intervals. To stall for time, Holmes uses Moriarty's vanity and pride to trick him into slowly bleeding Holmes to death "drop by drop". Holmes is saved at the last minute by Watson and Lestrade, who with Hoffner's help, successfully followed the luminous paint trail. Scotland Yard apprehends the spies, but Moriarty escapes. When he attempts to complete his escape through a secret passageway, he falls 60 feet to his death; Holmes has discovered the criminal's hidden trap door and left it open. With Tobel saved and the bombsight recovered, Watson notes that things "are looking up... this little island is still on the map".

== Cast ==
- Basil Rathbone as Sherlock Holmes
- Nigel Bruce as Doctor Watson
- Lionel Atwill as Professor Moriarty
- Kaaren Verne as Charlotte Eberli
- William Post Jr. as Dr Franz Tobel
- Dennis Hoey as Inspector Lestrade
- Holmes Herbert as Sir Reginald Bailey
- Mary Gordon as Mrs. Hudson
- Henry Victor as Dr. Frederick Hoffner
- Harry Woods as Kurt (uncredited)
- George Burr MacAnnan as Gottfried (uncredited)

=== Cast notes ===
This is the second Basil Rathbone "Sherlock Holmes" film in which Moriarty dies. He is thrown to his death from the top of the Tower of London by Holmes in 1939's The Adventures of Sherlock Holmes. During the course of the adventure, Holmes adopts the disguises of an elderly German bookseller (taken from the Arthur Conan Doyle story "The Adventure of the Empty House"), the lascar sailor Ram Singh, and the Swiss scientist Professor Hoffner. His disguise as the bookseller was parodied in the film The Pink Panther.

This film marks the first appearance of Dennis Hoey as Inspector Lestrade - the Scotland Yard detective who, with Watson, provides much of the comic relief in six of the films of the series. Lionel Atwill appeared previously in the film The Hound of the Baskervilles (1939) as Dr Mortimer.

== Adaptation notes ==
Though the film is credited as an adaptation of "The Dancing Men", little resemblance is noted between the two other than the code. By implication, the events of "The Dancing Men" are canon with the events of the film, as Watson is reminded of "a case [they] had some years ago".

== See also ==
- Sherlock Holmes (1939 film series)
- Adaptations of Sherlock Holmes in film
