= The House of Fear (1945 film) =

1945 film by Roy William Neill

- 1945 theatrical poster
- Directed by: Roy William Neill
- Screenplay by: Roy Chanslor
- Based on: the 1891 story "The Adventure of the Five Orange Pips" by Sir Arthur Conan Doyle
- Produced by: Roy William Neill
- Starring: Basil Rathbone; Nigel Bruce; Aubrey Mather
- Cinematography: Virgil Miller
- Edited by: Saul A. Goodkind
- Music by: Paul Sawtell
- Distributed by: Universal Pictures
- Release date: March 16, 1945
- Running time: 69 minutes
- Country: United States
- Language: English

The House of Fear is a 1945 Sherlock Holmes crime horror film starring Basil Rathbone and Nigel Bruce. Directed by Roy William Neill, it is loosely based on the 1891 short story "The Five Orange Pips" by Arthur Conan Doyle. It is the 10th film of the Rathbone/Bruce collaboration as Holmes and Dr. Watson.

== Plot ==
Sherlock Holmes is visited by Mr. Chalmers, an insurance agent with a strange tale. Seven single men, calling themselves the "Good Comrades", live together in the remote Scottish castle of Drearcliffe House, near the village of Inverneill. Recently one of the "Good Comrades" received a strange message, an envelope containing nothing but seven orange pips (seeds). That night, he was murdered and his body horribly mutilated. A few days later, a second envelope was delivered, this time containing six pips, and the recipient also died mysteriously soon afterwards, his battered corpse being recovered from the base of the cliffs. Chalmers holds £100,000 of life insurance policies on the seven men, and suspects that one is systematically murdering the others in order to collect the money, and begs Holmes to investigate.

Holmes and Dr. Watson arrive at the scene only to find another murder has occurred, its body burned to a crisp. Inspector Lestrade also arrives to investigate. Despite Holmes' best efforts three more deaths occur, each time leaving the victim's body unrecognizable. Meanwhile, the local tobacconist Alec MacGregor writes a message to Lestrade, which already had been opened and resealed before it arrived in the inspector's possession. Holmes and Lestrade went to MacGregor's shop to investigate, only to learn the tobacconist was shot in the back before they got there.

Lestrade jumps to the obvious conclusion that the last surviving member, Bruce Alastair, murdered all the others. However, after Watson goes missing, Holmes has deduced the plot behind it all and leads Lestrade (and Alastair) to a secret room where all the "Good Comrades" are hiding and Watson is tied up. Holmes explains that Alastair was the victim of a plot to frame him for murder and collect the insurance money by the other six. MacGregor had been murdered because he had spotted one of them alive on the beach.

== Cast ==
- Basil Rathbone as Sherlock Holmes
- Nigel Bruce as Dr. John Watson
- Aubrey Mather as Bruce Alastair
- Dennis Hoey as Inspector Lestrade
- Paul Cavanagh as Dr. Simon Merivale
- Holmes Herbert as Alan Cosgrave
- Harry Cording as Captain John Simpson
- Sally Shepherd as Mrs. Monteith
- Gavin Muir as Mr. Chalmers
- David Clyde as Alec MacGregor
- Florette Hillier as Alison MacGregor
- Wilson Benge as Guy Davis
- Cyril Delevanti as Stanley Raeburn
- Richard Alexander as Ralph King
- Doris Lloyd as Bessie, Innkeeper
- Alec Craig as Angus
- C.E. Anderson as Mourner (uncredited)
- Leslie Denison as Sergeant Bleeker (uncredited)

== See also ==
- Sherlock Holmes (1939 film series)
- Adaptations of Sherlock Holmes in film
