= This Was a Man =

This Was a Man is a play in three acts by Noël Coward. It satirizes the adulterous affairs of English high society. Its main characters are Edward Churt, a successful modern portrait painter and his wife Carol whose "vivid personality is composed of a minimum of intellect and a maximum of sex." Carol is prone to having affairs with other men, but Edward is fully aware of this and for most of the play does not seem to mind. It is typical of inter-war period drama due to its lightheartedness and overall sense of fun.

== Production history ==
=== London Rejection, 1926 ===
Controversy surrounded the play due to its comic way of dealing with the issue of adultery. It is seen as commonplace in the play and there are few repercussions to it. Even at the very end, when Edward finally declares he is going to divorce Carol, he nonchalantly goes off to lunch, while the last line "there's always time to shoot yourself" brings the play back firmly into comic territory.

This Was a Man was refused licence by the Lord Chamberlain (Britain's theatre censor) at the time, despite allowing The Vortex, Noël Coward's play about drug addiction, on the public stage a few years earlier. The reality is that adultery was far more available to the masses than illegal narcotics were and after much debate in the Lord Chamberlain's office it was decided that it should be refused licence. Instead, the show played in New York in 1926.

=== New York 1926 ===
After being banned in the U.K. the play was premiered in the United States of America. The play opened in November 1926 directed by Basil Dean at the Klaw Theatre in New York. Though Coward wrote positively about the play during his visits to the rehearsals, he became sharply critical after its premiere. Though he felt Francis Larrimore was 'very good' as Carol he wrote that Nigel Bruce as Evelyn 'never understood what it was all about'. Critic Percy Hammand though critical of the production praised Bruce as "the chief joys of the evening". A. E. Mathews' performance as Edward was undermined when 'he forgot most of his lines'. Mathews' letter, apologising for the damage his inability to remember the lines had done to the production, is amongst Coward's published letters. Coward would later reflect in a letter to Basil Dean in 1929 that the production's 'primary defects have been over-meticulous business and slowness of tempo'. The production failed to receive the critical praise of his previous works. By 8 December Coward wrote "This Was a Man is drifting along … some of the critics (the principal ones) have said very good things about it but I fear too late to save it." Following a period of intense success the comparative failure of This Was a Man had taken its toll on Coward health. By 14 December Coward wrote 'that I have been living on nervous energy for years and now it has given out and that I must go away at once!... I haven’t had a break down but the doctor says I'm on the verge of one'

=== Berlin and Paris, 1920s ===
This Was a Man opened in Paris on 11 January 1926. It was presented by Edward Sterling who stated in his autobiography that 'it broke all records. Extra police were called up to regulate the crowds waiting outside.' This Was a Man was performed over a hundred and fifty times in the following twelve months. The play was revived by the company for seasons in Zurich, Monte Carlo, Belgium, Holland, Hamburg Egypt and South America. The last known professional production in the twentieth century took place in 1934.

This Was a Man had its German premiere in 1927. The play was a 'big success' in Berlin, warmly received by both the audience and critics. Its run only came to an end to allow it to be replaced by another Coward play. Critic Alfred Kerr writing in the Berliner Tagblatt felt the play reflected the changes in post-war attitudes. He noted that though adultery was still taking place prior to the first world war, it was done so ' more carefully, with much more fear of being found out'. The Berlin production was produced by Forster Larrinaga

=== British Premier, 2014 ===
After the play was refused its license in 1926 no further applications were made to the Lord Chamberlain. The first professional production took place at The Finborough Theatre, an award-winning fringe theatre based in Earls Court, West London. The production opened on 15 July 2014. The play ran until 2 August 2014, selling out its entire run. The production was directed by Belinda Lang. Lang is also a well known actress, who had previously appeared in productions of Hay Fever, Present Laughter and Blithe Spirit. The production was produced by Julyan Creative Productions in association with Neil McPherson for the Finborough Theatre. The cast included Jamie De Courcey as Edward Churt, Dorothea Myer-Bennett as Carol Churt and Robert Portal as Evelyn Bathurst. The production did not perform the original text in its entirety and removed the characters of Berry and Blackwell. Matt Trueman in his review in the Telegraph noted that This Was a Man 'doesn’t condone adultery, he’s sympathetic to its causes. Relationships have their roots in happenstance and hurt, not true love and fate.' Though major critics only awarded the production 3 stars, others including A Younger Theatre praised that 'Despite the serious themes of the play, there are still some big laughs'. Many critics echoed The Times' comment 'That a really rather fine play by Noël Coward has had to wait until now for its professional UK premiere is astounding'.

=== London West End, 2017 ===
This Was a Man finally debuted on London's West End in May 2017. The production took place over 90 years after the play was originally due to appear in West End. It was the first UK production to present the full script unedited (including the characters Berry and Blackwell). The play opened on 11 May at The Leicester Square Theatre for a three-week run. The production was produced by Venture Wolf, directed by James Paul Taylor, and featured Paul Vitty as Edward Churt, Daisy Porter as Carol Churt, and Tom Pike as Evelyn. The production's website stated, "The play’s exploration of love, marriage and the shallowness of modern society feel as poignant and relevant as ever."
