= Pursuit to Algiers =

1945 film by Roy William Neill

- 1946 US theatrical poster
- Directed by: Roy William Neill
- Screenplay by: Leonard Lee
- Based on: Characters by Sir Arthur Conan Doyle
- Produced by: Howard Benedict
- Starring: Basil Rathbone; Nigel Bruce
- Cinematography: Paul Ivano
- Edited by: Saul A. Goodkind
- Music by: Edgar Fairchild
- Production company: Universal Pictures
- Distributed by: Universal Pictures
- Release date: October 26, 1945
- Running time: 65 minutes
- Country: United States
- Language: English

Pursuit to Algiers (1945) is the twelfth entry in the Basil Rathbone/Nigel Bruce Sherlock Holmes film series of fourteen. Elements in the story pay homage to an otherwise unrecorded affair mentioned by Dr. Watson at the beginning of the 1903 story "The Adventure of the Norwood Builder", notably the steamship Friesland. Off-camera, Watson also recounts to his audience another unrecorded affair mentioned in the 1924 story "The Adventure of the Sussex Vampire", that of the Giant Rat of Sumatra, "a story for which the world is not yet prepared".

== Plot ==
About to leave London for a much-needed holiday, Sherlock Holmes and Dr. Watson receive a cryptic invitation. Intrigued, Holmes accepts and is met by the prime minister of Rovenia [Rovinia], who begs him to escort Prince Nikolas home. His father has been assassinated, and, as his heir, Nikolas is now king. Holmes agrees.

Arrangements have already been made for an airplane. When it develops engine problems, a smaller replacement has room only for the Prince and Holmes, leaving Watson behind. When Watson protests, Holmes suggests that he follow on a passenger ship bound for Algiers.

On the voyage, Watson reads that the airplane has crashed in the Pyrenees and that it is unlikely that there are any survivors. Holmes, however, has an aversion to plans made by others and is aboard the ship with Nikolas. He instructs Watson to introduce the prince to the other passengers as his nephew. Though Watson suspects everyone, from singer Sheila Woodbury to exercise fanatic Agatha Dunham to a secretive pair who later turn out to be archeologists, of being killers, it is not until the ship makes an unscheduled stop at Lisbon that the real agents come aboard: Gregor, circus knife-thrower Mirko, and a hulking mute named Gubec.

First, Mirko tries to kill Holmes by throwing a knife through a porthole, then Gregor substitutes an explosive party favor, but Holmes foils both attempts. Finally, the villains succeed in kidnapping the prince when they dock at Algiers, only for Holmes to reveal that the "prince" was a decoy; the real prince had been posing as a steward, hidden in plain sight the whole time. The decoy Nikolas is later recovered unharmed.

== Cast ==
- Basil Rathbone as Sherlock Holmes
- Nigel Bruce as Dr. Watson
- Marjorie Riordan as Sheila Woodbury
- Rosalind Ivan as Agatha Dunham
- Morton Lowry as Steward
- Leslie Vincent as Prince Nikolas, a.k.a. "Nikolas Watson"
- Martin Kosleck as Mirko
- Rex Evans as Gregor
- John Abbott as Jodri
- Gerald Hamer as Kingston
- William 'Wee Willie' Davis as Gubec
- Tom Dillon as Restaurant Owner
- Frederick Worlock as Prime Minister
- Sven Hugo Borg as Johansson

== Reception ==
Universal Studios film director Roy Neill delivers a tongue-in-cheek version of the Sherlock Holmes film genre in Pursuit to Algiers in which even the actors "seem aware they are trapped within a genre picture."

“His interminable success: could he not fail just once and prove himself a human being!" - Actor Basil Rathbone on the cinematic rendition of Sherlock Holmes

This "camp" portrayal of the famous detective exaggerates every virtue of Conan Doyle's literary creation, with Neill and Rathbone issuing a burlesque reveling in Holmes unerring expertise in everything” ranging from the "Moorish architecture of Lisbon" to "recognizing a knife-thrower glimpsed at an obscure Parisian circus" and perfectly identifying "suspicious foreigners" based on their "gravely flawed fashion sense."

== See also ==
- Sherlock Holmes (1939 film series)
- Adaptations of Sherlock Holmes in film
