= The Scarlet Claw =

1944 film by Roy William Neill

- 1944 US Theatrical Poster
- Directed by: Roy William Neill
- Screenplay by: Paul Gangelin
- Based on: Characters by Sir Arthur Conan Doyle
- Produced by: Roy William Neill
- Starring: Basil Rathbone; Nigel Bruce; Paul Cavanagh
- Cinematography: George Robinson
- Edited by: Paul Landres
- Music by: Paul Sawtell
- Production company: Universal Pictures
- Distributed by: Universal Pictures
- Release date: May 26, 1944
- Running time: 74 minutes
- Country: United States
- Language: English

The Scarlet Claw is a 1944 American mystery thriller film based on Sir Arthur Conan Doyle's Sherlock Holmes detective stories. Directed by Roy William Neill and starring Basil Rathbone and Nigel Bruce, it is the eighth film of the Rathbone/Bruce series. David Stuart Davies notes on the film's DVD audio commentary that it is generally considered by critics and fans of the series to be the best of the twelve Holmes films made by Universal. There are parallels with Conan Doyle's novel The Hound of the Baskervilles.

== Plot ==
Sherlock Holmes and Dr. Watson are in Canada attending a conference on the occult, when Lord Penrose receives a message that his wife Lady Penrose has been murdered in the small village of La Mort Rouge. Holmes and Watson are about to return home when Holmes receives a telegram from Lady Penrose, sent before her death, asking for help as she fears for her life. Holmes decides to investigate her death.

Holmes and Watson arrive at the village and discover that the inhabitants are all convinced that the murder is the work of the legendary monster of La Mort Rouge, which roams the marshes around the village. The "monster" is even later seen by Dr. Watson, who describes it as "the mostly ghastly apparition... like a roaring furnace spitting fire in all directions".

Holmes, however, is skeptical, and recognizes Lady Penrose as Lillian Gentry, a former actress, who was involved in a famous murder case several years before when actor Alistair Ramson killed another actor in a jealous rage over her. Ramson was believed to have been killed in a prison escape two years before, but now Holmes believes that Ramson - a master of disguise - is living in the village, having created a new identity, perhaps several, for himself.

Holmes then turns his attention to Judge Brisson, another inhabitant of the village with a connection to the case, as he passed sentence on Ramson. Despite Holmes' warnings, Brisson is murdered. Holmes tracks Ramson down to his hideout and discovers there is a third person that Ramson is preparing to kill. While Ramson is holding Holmes at gunpoint, Watson blunders in and Ramson escapes, albeit before Holmes can learn who Ramson's final target is.

Holmes learns that the third victim is to be Journet, the local inn-keeper, formerly a prison guard. However Journet has gone into hiding. Ramson then kills Marie, Journet's daughter, for not revealing her father's hideout. Holmes finds Journet and convinces him to spring a trap for the murderer.

Holmes and Watson announce that they are returning to Britain, and Journet comes out of hiding and lets it be known that he will be going to a church across the marsh to offer a prayer for Marie. Ramson attacks Journet out in the marsh, only to find that it is Holmes in disguise. The two men struggle, but Ramson escapes only to be killed by Journet with the murderer's own weapon, a five-pronged garden weeder.

== Cast ==
- Basil Rathbone as Sherlock Holmes
- Nigel Bruce as Dr. John Watson
- Gerald Hamer as Alistair Ramson
- Paul Cavanagh as William, Lord Penrose
- Arthur Hohl as Emile Journet (Hohl also dubbed over Basil Rathbone's voice in a scene where Holmes is disguised as Journet)
- Kay Harding as Marie Journet
- Miles Mander as Judge Brisson
- David Clyde as Sergeant Thompson
- Ian Wolfe as Drake
- Victoria Horne as Nora
- Gertrude Astor as Lady Lillian Gentry Penrose

== Production ==
The film is not credited as an adaptation of any of Sir Arthur Conan Doyle's Holmes tales, but it bears a significant resemblance to his 1902 novel The Hound of the Baskervilles. Alan Barnes, in his book Sherlock Holmes On Screen, describes The Scarlet Claw as "owing much" to Hound, listing their similarities: "a remote marshland setting; a painted-phosphorescent but thought-supernatural terror, an escaped convict on the loose, a cold killer ingratiating himself with everyone in the vicinity; a subplot involving cast-off clothing; plus, of course, Holmes' method of unmasking the murderer, making to return home but actually remaining behind to catch the villain red-handed (or, indeed, scarlet-clawed)."

Early in the film, Watson's character directly refers to The Hound of the Baskervilles.

At the very end of the film, Holmes quotes from Winston Churchill, after which Watson asks, "Churchill say that?" Holmes replies "Yes, Churchill." The music swells and Rathbone's voice drops, but he continues to speak several more words which are not heard, but lip movement indicates that he says, "God bless him."

== See also ==
- Sherlock Holmes (1939 film series)
- Adaptations of Sherlock Holmes in film
