= Sir Michael Bruce, 11th Baronet =

British author (1894–1957)

Sir Michael William Selby Bruce
- Born: 27 March 1894; United States
- Died: 2 May 1957 (aged 63); Vancouver, British Columbia, Canada

Sir Michael William Selby Bruce, 11th Baronet (27 March 1894 – 2 May 1957) was an author and soldier.

== Early life and education ==
The son of Sir William Waller Bruce, 10th Baronet (1856–1912), of West Drayton, Middlesex, director of an art gallery and his wife Angelica Lady Bruce (died 1917), daughter of General George Selby, Royal Artillery. Michael Bruce entered Abingdon School from October 1907–1910.

== Career ==
He joined the British South Africa Police as a trooper (1913). After the First World War service with the Royal Artillery at Gallipoli and on the Western Front, Bruce became a traveller, largely in Africa and South America, and an author and newspaper columnist. During the Second World War he served in a barrage balloon unit, with 901 (County of London) squadron, Royal Air Force Regiment, and was wounded again. Later in the war he was Senior Weapons Instructor for glider pilots at Bridgnorth.

== Personal life ==
He was the elder brother of Nigel Bruce, the actor. He married Elizabeth Constance Plummer of Toronto in 1933 and after her death during World War II, married again in 1945. He died in Vancouver, British Columbia in 1957.

== See also ==
- List of Old Abingdonians

== Bibliography ==
- Songs from the Saddle (1916)
- Sails and Saddles (1929)
- Tramp Royal (1954),(Autobiographical) First published by Elek (UK) and then Ryerson Press (Canada)
- Currie Jack Mosquito Victory Goodall 1983 Mentioned as Senior Weapons Instructor for glider pilots, and out on the town in London with actress Frances Day.

Baronetage of Nova Scotia
Preceded by William Bruce	Baronet (of Stenhouse); 1912–1957	Succeeded by Francis Bruce
