= Sherlock Holmes and the Voice of Terror =

1942 film by John Rawlins

- Film poster
- Directed by: John Rawlins
- Screenplay by: Lynn Riggs; Robert Hardy Andrews
- Based on: "His Last Bow" by Sir Arthur Conan Doyle
- Starring: Basil Rathbone; Nigel Bruce; Evelyn Ankers; Reginald Denny; Thomas Gomez
- Cinematography: Elwood Bredell
- Edited by: Russell Schoengarth
- Music by: Frank Skinner
- Production company: Universal Pictures
- Distributed by: Universal Pictures
- Release date: 18 September 1942
- Running time: 65 minutes
- Country: United States
- Language: English

Sherlock Holmes and the Voice of Terror is a 1942 American mystery thriller film based on Sir Arthur Conan Doyle's Sherlock Holmes detective stories. The film combines elements of Doyle's short story "His Last Bow", to which it is credited as an adaptation, and the real-life activities of Lord Haw-Haw.

Directed by John Rawlins, Sherlock Holmes and the Voice of Terror is the third of fourteen films starring Basil Rathbone as Holmes and Nigel Bruce as Dr. John Watson. It is the first film in the series to be released by Universal Pictures and the first to be set in contemporaneous times.

== Plot ==
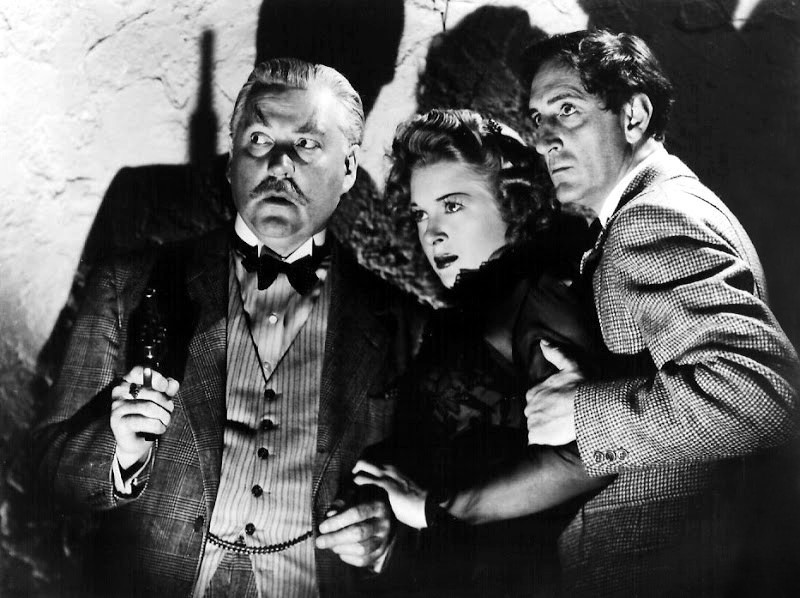
Nigel Bruce, Evelyn Ankers and Basil Rathbone in Sherlock Holmes and the Voice of Terror (1942)

Holmes is called into the "Inner Council" of British Intelligence by Sir Evan Barham, to assist in stopping Nazi saboteurs operating in Britain, whose activities are announced in advance in radio broadcasts by "The Voice of Terror".

Gavin, one of Holmes's operatives, is killed with a German dagger in his back. Before he dies, Gavin utters the word "Christopher." Later, Holmes and Watson go to the Limehouse district of London, where they meet with Gavin's wife Kitty.

Holmes tells the council that, through the use of an oscilloscope to carefully analyze and compare sound wave patterns from radio broadcasts of live vs. pre-recorded voices, he has determined that "The Voice of Terror" is actually recorded on phonograph records in the United Kingdom, but broadcast from Germany. Using a tip from Kitty, Holmes and Watson go to the old Christopher Docks, where they are followed by Sir Anthony Lloyd of the council. The three men are captured by a group of Nazi spies led by Meade however Holmes, Watson and Lloyd are freed by some of the East End men as they attack the Nazis, although Meade manages to escape through a trap door to a waiting speedboat.

Kitty pretends to be a thief on the run and joins Meade. She finds out that Meade plans to go to Sir Evan's country estate in Kent that night. There Holmes and Sir Evan watch a German plane land and although Sir Evan fires at it, Meade has time to pas a package to the pilot who then successfully takes off while Meade has time to hide.

After one of Holmes informants traces Meade and Kitty to the south coast of England, Holmes forces the council to go there with him. With the support of British troopers, Holmes captures Meade and a group of German soldiers stationed in an abandoned church.

There he reveals the true identity of "The Voice of Terror" as Sir Evan Barham, who happens to be an impostor. Holmes then reveals that in World War I, the real Barham was a prisoner in a German war camp and had an uncanny resemblance to a Heinrich Von Bock, a member of the German Secret Service; one day the real Barham was taken out and executed; the gentleman who called Holmes into the case was Von Bock himself who had been posing as Barham for 24 years; Holmes then adds that Barham had no immediate family, so his private life was well studied by Von Bock, who also studied at Oxford and had knowledge of English language and manners. So, with a little help of plastic surgery, not to mention the resemblance to Barham in the first place, the deception was carried out thoroughly. Holmes also concludes that the real Sir Evan Barham carried a scar from childhood, the one Von Bock carried from plastic surgery was approximately 20 years old – the clue that gave away the fact that he was an impostor.

Holmes then informs the spies that the German invasion force has been destroyed. The angry Meade shoots and fatally wounds Kitty, but is killed himself as he attempts to escape. The Council stand around the murdered Kitty and swear that her heroic death will not be in vain.

== Cast ==
Cast adapted from the book Universal Horrors.

- Basil Rathbone as Sherlock Holmes
- Nigel Bruce as Dr. John H. Watson
- Evelyn Ankers as Kitty
- Reginald Denny as Sir Evan Barham / Heinrich von Bock / The Voice of Terror
- Thomas Gomez as R.F. Meade
- Henry Daniell as Anthony Lloyd
- Montagu Love as General Jerome Lawford
- Hillary Brooke as Jill Grandis
- Mary Gordon as Mrs. Hudson
- Arthur Blake as Crosbie
- Leyland Hodgson as Captain Roland Shore
- Olaf Hytten as Adm. Sir John Prentiss
- Harry Stubbs as Taxi Driver
- Harry Cording as Camberwell
- Rudolph Anders as Schieler
- Donald Stuart as Grady
- Leslie Denison as London Bobby
- Robert Barron as Gavin
- Alec Harford as London Bobby
- John Rogers as Duggan
- Ted Billings as Basement Dive Bartender (uncredited)

== Background and production ==
The late 1930s and early 1940s were described by the authors of the book Universal Horrors as "the true heyday of the detective film"; they noted that nearly every studio had at least one series based on a popular fictional detective. Universal Pictures had been producing mystery films for a long time, but had not truly produced any detective films. 20th Century-Fox wanted to exercise their options on a Sherlock Holmes film, but negotiations with The Conan Doyle estate became unfruitful when the estate insisted that all future scripts must remain faithful to the original material opposed to building new adventures for the detective. Shortly after this, Warner Bros. displayed an interest in adapting "The Speckled Band" with Rathbone and Bruce as Sherlock Holmes and Dr. Watson respectively. This film was not made per a notice in the Hollywood Reporter claiming there were "difficulties encountered in clearing all rights in the complicated copyright setup covering Holmes yarns." The Hollywood Reporter reported that writer Bob Jackson was originally assigned to write the screenplay for this production, but his contribution to the released film has not been determined.

In early 1942, Universal entered into a contract with the estate, and agreed to pay $300,000 (equal to $5911405 today) for the screen rights to the character. According to the author of Universal Horrors, with the exception of MGM's The Thin Man series, detective films were usually relegated to be second features with the Sherlock Holmes series being given average budgets and less hectic production schedules. Filming began on May 5, 1942, under the title Sherlock Holmes Saves London. The film was directed by John Rawlins, the only of Universal's Sherlock Holmes films that wasn't directed by Roy William Neill.

The film ends with a direct quote from His Last Bow:

Watson: It's a lovely morning, Holmes.
Holmes: There's an east wind coming, Watson.
Watson: I don't think so. Looks like another warm day.
Holmes: Good old Watson. The one fixed point in a changing age. There's an east wind coming all the same. Such a wind as never blew on England yet. It will be cold and bitter, Watson, and a good many of us may wither before its blast. But it's God's own wind none the less. And a greener, better, stronger land will lie in the sunshine when the storm is cleared.

== Release ==
Sherlock Holmes and the Voice of Terror was released on September 18, 1942. It was distributed by Universal Pictures Company, Inc.

== Reception ==
From contemporary reviews, critics Kate Cameron of The Hollywood Reporter and Eileen Creelman of The New York Sun complimented the cinematography while Archer Winsten of The New York Post and Kate Cameron of The New York Daily News praised Rathbone and Bruce in their roles. The Film Daily commented on the overall quality of the film stating that "Though routine and undistinguished, the melodrama [...] has a fair amount of thrilling action and much speed [...] The acting is generally good." Winsten commented on the film's contemporary setting, concluding that "It is to be feared that neither the Holmes series nor the war effort are greatly aided by this ambitious but uneffective attempt to merge the two."

== See also ==
- Sherlock Holmes (1939 film series)
- Adaptations of Sherlock Holmes in cinema
