= Terror by Night =

1946 film

- Promotional film poster
- Directed by: Roy William Neill
- Written by: Frank Gruber
- Based on: Characters and stories by Sir Arthur Conan Doyle
- Produced by: Roy William Neill
- Starring: Basil Rathbone; Nigel Bruce
- Cinematography: Maury Gertsman
- Edited by: Saul A. Goodkind
- Music by: Milton Rosen
- Production company: Universal Pictures
- Distributed by: Universal Pictures
- Release date: February 1, 1946 (United States)
- Running time: 60 minutes
- Country: United States
- Language: English

Terror by Night is a 1946 British Sherlock Holmes crime drama film directed by Roy William Neill and starring Basil Rathbone and Nigel Bruce. It was written by Frank Gruber.

The story revolves around the theft of a famous diamond aboard a train. The film's plot is a mostly original story not directly based on any of Arthur Conan Doyle's Holmes tales, but it uses minor plot elements of "The Adventure of the Blue Carbuncle," "The Adventure of the Empty House," "The Disappearance of Lady Frances Carfax," and "The Sign of Four".

The film is one of four films in the series which are in the public domain.

== Plot ==
The full film

In London, Vivian Vedder verifies that a carpenter has completed a coffin for her recently deceased mother's body, which she is transporting to Scotland by train. She boards the train that evening, as do Lady Margaret Carstairs, who owns and is transporting the famous Star of Rhodesia diamond; Lady Margaret's son, Roland; Sherlock Holmes, whom Roland has hired to protect the diamond; Inspector Lestrade, who is also worried about the diamond's safety; and Dr. Watson and Watson's friend Major Duncan-Bleek. Holmes briefly examines the diamond.

Shortly afterward, Roland is murdered and the diamond is stolen. Lestrade, Holmes, and Watson learn nothing conclusive in questioning the other passengers. At one point during the investigation, Watson believes an elderly couple is guilty of the crime but the only crime that they have committed is stealing a teapot from a hotel. While searching the train, Holmes is pushed out of the train, nearly to his death, but climbs back into the day coach and discovers a secret compartment in the coffin carrying Miss Vedder's mother. He suspects that one of the people on the train is the notorious jewel thief Colonel Sebastian Moran.

Upon further questioning, Miss Vedder admits that a man paid her to transport the coffin. As Watson and Duncan-Bleek join the group, Holmes reveals that he swapped the diamond with an imitation while examining it. Lestrade ostensibly takes possession of the real diamond.

In the luggage compartment, Holmes and Watson find a train guard murdered with a poisoned dart. Meanwhile, a street criminal named Sands incapacitates the conductor. Sands was hidden inside the coffin, and is in cahoots with Duncan-Bleek, who is, in fact, Colonel Moran. Sands and Moran go to Lestrade's room, where Sands knocks Lestrade unconscious and steals the diamond from him; but Moran double-crosses Sands, shooting him dead with the same dart gun he used to kill Roland and the guard.

The train makes an unexpected stop to pick up several Scottish policemen, led allegedly by Inspector McDonald. Holmes informs McDonald that Duncan-Bleek is really Moran, and McDonald arrests Moran and finds the diamond in his vest, but Moran seizes a policeman's gun and pulls the emergency cord to stop the train. During a scuffle in which the lights are turned off, Holmes subdues and handcuffs Moran, then secretly hides him under a table. When the lights are turned on again, the officers leave the train with Lestrade, his coat covering his face, believing he is Moran. As the train departs, Lestrade captures the thieves in the railway station, and Holmes reveals to Watson and Moran that he recognized McDonald as an impostor and recovered the diamond from him during the fight.

== Cast ==
- Basil Rathbone as Sherlock Holmes
- Nigel Bruce as Dr. Watson
- Alan Mowbray as Major Duncan-Bleek/Colonel Sebastian Moran
- Dennis Hoey as Inspector Lestrade
- Renee Godfrey as Vivian Vedder
- Frederick Worlock as Professor Kilbane
- Mary Forbes as Lady Margaret Carstairs
- Billy Bevan as Train attendant (uncredited)
- Gerald Hamer as Alfred Shallcross (uncredited)
- Janet Murdoch as Mrs. Shallcross (uncredited)
- Skelton Knaggs as Sands (uncredited)
- Geoffrey Steele as The Honourable Roland Carstairs (uncredited)
- Boyd Davis as Inspector MacDonald (uncredited)
- Harry Cording as Mock, the coffin maker (uncredited)

== Reception ==
The Monthly Film Bulletin wrote: "Basil Rathbone and Nigel Bruce, as Holmes and Dr. Watson, enact their customary roles in their customary manner. There is nothing original in the plot or its treatment to lift it out of the ranks of a hundred "Sherlock Holmes" and other similar detective stories."

Kine Weekly wrote: "The plot itself is a trifle wordy and involved, but the old trick of unfolding it on a fast-moving train cunningly creates an illusion of pace and scope. The climax is both exciting and neat. But goodness knows why the Censor has thought fit to give the film an "A" certificate. After all, youngsters are allowed, to buy and read Sherlock Holmes' adventures. Why on earth can't they see them unhindered?"

== See also ==
- Sherlock Holmes
- Sherlock Holmes (1939 film series)
- Adaptations of Sherlock Holmes in film
- List of American films of 1946
