= Nigel Bruce =

British actor (1895–1953)

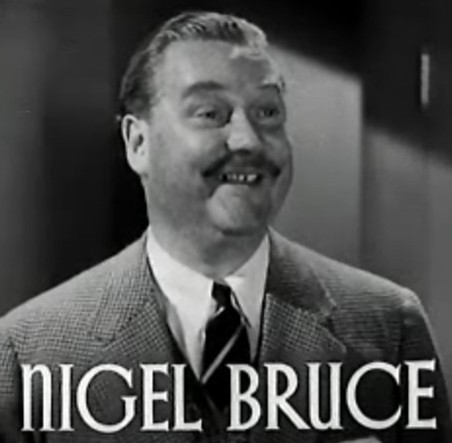
- Bruce in The Last of Mrs. Cheyney (1937)
- Born: William Nigel Ernle Bruce; 4 February 1895; Ensenada, Baja California, Mexico
- Died: 8 October 1953 (aged 58); Santa Monica, California, U.S.
- Resting place: Chapel of the Pines Crematory
- Citizenship: British
- Occupation: Actor
- Years active: 1920–1953
- Spouse: Violet Pauline Shelton (m. 1921)
- Children: 2
- Relatives: Sir Michael Bruce, 11th Baronet (brother); Julian Gilbey (great-grandson); Will Gilbey (great-grandson); Christopher Plummer (second cousin)

William Nigel Ernle Bruce (4 February 1895 – 8 October 1953) was an English actor on stage and screen. He portrayed Dr. Watson in a series of films and in the radio series The New Adventures of Sherlock Holmes, starring alongside Basil Rathbone as Sherlock Holmes in both. Bruce also played roles in the Alfred Hitchcock films Rebecca and Suspicion, as well as Charlie Chaplin's Limelight and the original Lassie film Lassie Come Home.

== Early life ==
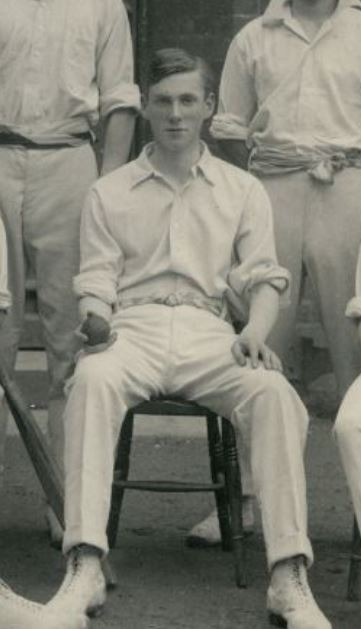
Bruce pictured in the Abingdon School first XI cricket team in 1912

Bruce was the second son of Sir William Waller Bruce, 10th Baronet and his wife Angelica, Lady Bruce, daughter of General George Selby, Royal Artillery. He was born in Ensenada, Baja California, Mexico, while his parents were touring the world. His older brother was the author and adventurer Sir Michael Bruce.

He received his formal education at The Grange School in Stevenage, and from 1908 to 1912 at Abingdon School in Abingdon-on-Thames. At Abingdon he was a keen sportsman, playing for the first XI cricket team (for which he received Colours), the athletics' first team and the school's football 2nd XI.

In 1912, Bruce left school at the age of 17, and took up a position as a stockbroker's clerk in the City of London. In early 1914, while working in the City he voluntarily enlisted in the British Army's Territorial Force as an infantry soldier with the Honourable Artillery Company as its Private #852.

At the outbreak of World War I in early August 1914, he was mobilised with the regiment, and went out to the Western Front with its 1st Battalion on 18 September 1914 at the age of 19. On 5 January 1915, while in trenches at Kemmel in Belgium, he was machine-gunned in the legs, causing multiple wounds and a fractured right thigh, and was subsequently medically evacuated to the United Kingdom, where he spent the rest of 1915 recovering in hospital. In December 1915 he was discharged from the British Army as medically unfit for further military service due to permanent damage to his legs.

In October 1916, he re-enlisted with the British Army and received training with an Officer Cadet Battalion in Cambridge, subsequently receiving a commission in January 1917, as a subaltern with the 10th (Service) Battalion, of the Somerset Light Infantry Regiment, a home service battalion, with which he served as a training officer for the rest of 1917, the permanent infirmity of his 1915 wounds preventing further active service at the front.

== Career ==
After being discharged from the British Army, Bruce abandoned a career in the City of London Stock Exchange, and pursued a career as a professional actor. He made his stage debut on 12 May 1920 at London's Comedy Theatre as a footman in the play Why Marry?. In October of that year, he went to Canada as stage manager to Henry V. Esmond and Eva Moore, also playing "Montague Jordan" in Eliza Comes to Stay. Upon returning to England, he toured in the same role.

He appeared regularly on-stage thereafter, and 8 years later, began working in silent films. In 1926, he made his Broadway debut as Major Evelyn Bathurst in Noël Coward's This Was a Man. He returned to Broadway several times during the 1930s, portraying Philip Downes in Ronald Jeans's Lean Harvest (1931), Mr. Jelliwell in Benn W. Levy's Springtime for Henry (1931–1932), His Excellency, Governor of the Colony in Arthur Schwartz's Virginia (1937), and W. S. Gilbert in Oscar Hammerstein II's Knights of Song (1938). He reprised this final role in the film Lillian Russell (1940).

In 1934, he had moved to Hollywood, U.S. As his career there became a success, he set up a home at 701 North Alpine Drive, Beverly Hills in the latter half of the 1930s.

Bruce typically played buffoonish, fuzzy-minded gentlemen. During his film career, he worked in 78 films, including Treasure Island (1934), The Charge of the Light Brigade (1936), Rebecca (1940), and Suspicion (1941).

He appeared in two landmark films: Becky Sharp (1935), the first feature film in full Technicolor, and Bwana Devil (1952), the first 3-D feature. He uncharacteristically played a detestable figure in The Rains Came (1939) which became the first film to win an Oscar for special effects.

== Dr. Watson ==
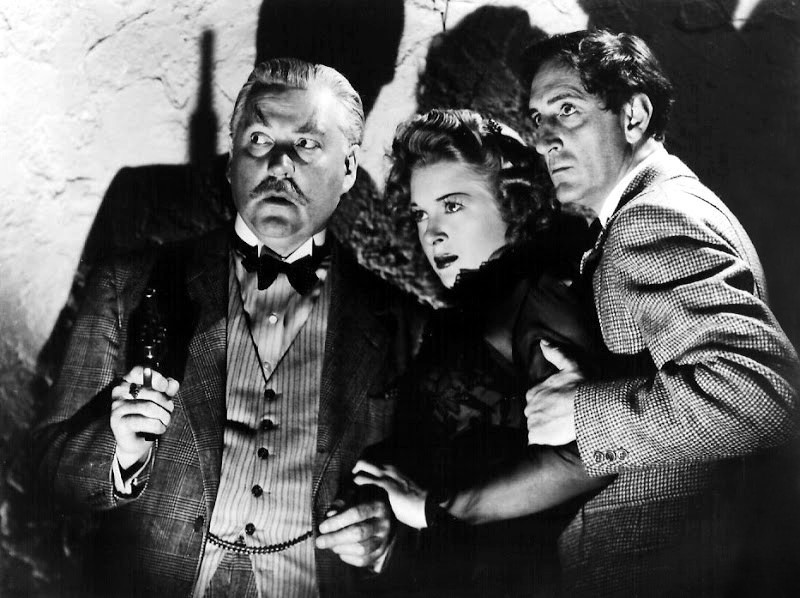
L. to R.: Nigel Bruce, Evelyn Ankers, and Basil Rathbone from the film Sherlock Holmes and the Voice of Terror (1942)

Bruce's career signature role was that of Dr. Watson in the 1939–1946 Sherlock Holmes film series, alongside his friend Basil Rathbone playing Holmes. Bruce starred as Watson in all 14 films of the series, and over 200 radio programs of The New Adventures of Sherlock Holmes. Although Watson often appears to be the older of the two main characters, Bruce was three years younger than Rathbone.

Though for most viewers Nigel Bruce formed their vision of Dr Watson, Holmes purists have long objected that the Watson of the books was intelligent and capable (although not an outstanding detective), and that Bruce's portrayal made Watson intellectually dimmer and more bumbling than the literary figure. (A nickname resulting from this portrayal was "Boobus Britannicus".) Loren D. Estleman wrote of Bruce:

If a mop bucket appeared in a scene, his foot would be inside it, and if by some sardonic twist of fate and the whim of director Roy William Neill he managed to stumble upon an important clue, he could be depended upon to blow his nose on it and throw it away.

Rathbone, however, spoke highly of Bruce's portrayal, saying that Watson was one of the screen's most lovable characters. The historian David Parkinson wrote that Bruce's "avuncular presence provided the perfect counterbalance to Rathbone's briskly omniscient sleuth".

Historian Alan Barnes notes that, despite the criticisms against him, Bruce rehabilitated Watson, who had been a marginal figure in the cinematic Holmes canon to that point: "after Bruce, it would be a near-unthinkable heresy to show Holmes without him". For the radio series, Bruce was allowed to play a more competent version of the character.

The Rathbone-Bruce co-star film series lapsed with the death of its producer-director Roy William Neill in 1946. Since then, most major modern adaptations of Arthur Conan Doyle's Sherlock Holmes stories, especially since the 1970s, have consciously defied the popular stereotype, and depicted Watson faithfully as a capable man of action.

== Family ==
Bruce was married, from 1921 until his death, to British actress Violet Campbell (née Violet Pauline Shelton) whom he always lovingly called "Bunny"; they had two daughters:

- Jennifer, married in 1944 (divorced in 1946) Jay Gould III, son of Jay Gould II;
- Pauline, married in 1946 the British flying ace Alan Geoffrey Page.

He was also a second cousin of the Canadian actor Christopher Plummer.

== Later life ==
Bruce, known as "Willie" to his friends, was a leading member of the British film colony in Los Angeles, and was captain of the (mostly British) Hollywood Cricket Club. Unlike some of his contemporaries, and along with other British actors such as Basil Rathbone and Charlie Chaplin, Bruce maintained his British citizenship, despite long residence in the United States. He also retained his memberships in London's Garrick Club and Buck's Club until his death. His final film, World for Ransom, was released posthumously in 1954.

== Death ==
Bruce died of a heart attack, in Santa Monica, California in 1953 at the age of 58. His body was cremated and his ashes were placed in a niche at the Chapel of the Pines Crematory in Los Angeles.

In 1947, he began writing an autobiography entitled Games, Gossip and Greasepaint, which is unpublished; however, excerpts have been printed in the Sherlock Holmes Journal, and these have been posted online with permission.

== Filmography ==
Year	Title	Role	Notes
1922	Flames of Passion	Undetermined minor role	Uncredited
1930	The Squeaker	Collie	
1930	Escape	Constable	
1930	Red Aces	Kinsfeather, T. B.	
1930	Birds of Prey	Major	
1931	The Calendar	Lord Willie Panniford	
1932	Lord Camber's Ladies	Lord Camber	
1932	The Midshipmaid	Major Spink	
1933	I Was a Spy	Scottie	
1933	Channel Crossing	Nigel Guthrie	
1934	Coming Out Party	Troon, the Butler	
1934	Stand Up and Cheer!	Eustis Dinwiddle	
1934	Murder in Trinidad	Bertram Lynch	
1934	The Lady Is Willing	Welton	
1934	Treasure Island	Squire Trelawney	
1934	Springtime for Henry	Johnny Jewlliwell	
1934	The Scarlet Pimpernel	The Prince of Wales	
1935	Becky Sharp	Joseph Sedley	
1935	She	Horace Holly	
1935	Jalna	Maurice Vaughn	
1935	The Man Who Broke the Bank at Monte Carlo	Ivan	
1936	The Trail of the Lonesome Pine	Major Thurber	
1936	Under Two Flags	Capt. Menzies	
1936	The White Angel	Dr. West	
1936	Follow Your Heart	Henri Forrester	
1936	The Charge of the Light Brigade	Sir Benjamin Warrenton	
1936	The Man I Marry	Robert Hartley	
1937	Thunder in the City	Duke of Glenavon	
1937	The Last of Mrs. Cheyney	Lord Willie Winton	
1938	The Baroness and the Butler	Major Andros	
1938	Kidnapped	Neil MacDonald	
1938	Suez	Sir Malcolm Cameron	
1939	The Hound of the Baskervilles	Dr. John H. Watson	
1939	The Adventures of Sherlock Holmes	Dr. John H. Watson	
1939	The Rains Came	Lord Albert Esketh	
1940	The Blue Bird	Mr. Luxury	
1940	Adventure in Diamonds	Col. J. W. Lansfield	
1940	Rebecca	Major Giles Lacy	
1940	Lillian Russell	W. S. Gilbert	
1940	Susan and God	Hutchins Stubbs	
1940	A Dispatch from Reuters	Sir Randolph Persham	
1941	Hudson's Bay	Prince Rupert	
1941	Play Girl	William McDonald Vincent	
1941	Free and Easy	Florian Clemington	
1941	This Woman Is Mine	Duncan MacDougall	
1941	The Chocolate Soldier	Bernard Fischer, Critic	
1941	Suspicion	Gordon Cochrane 'Beaky' Thwaite	
1942	Roxie Hart	E. Clay Benham	
1942	This Above All	Ramsbottom	
1942	Eagle Squadron	McKinnon	
1942	Sherlock Holmes and the Voice of Terror	Dr. John H. Watson	
1942	Journey for Margaret	Herbert V. Allison	
1942	Sherlock Holmes and the Secret Weapon	Dr. John H. Watson	
1943	Forever and a Day	Maj. Garrow	
1943	Sherlock Holmes in Washington	Dr. John H. Watson	
1943	Sherlock Holmes Faces Death	Dr. John H. Watson	
1943	Lassie Come Home	Duke of Rudling	
1943	Crazy House	Dr. John H. Watson	Cameo
1943	The Spider Woman	Dr. John H. Watson	
1944	Follow the Boys	Himself	Uncredited
1944	The Scarlet Claw	Dr. John H. Watson	
1944	The Pearl of Death	Dr. John H. Watson	
1944	Gypsy Wildcat	High Sheriff	
1944	Frenchman's Creek	Lord Godolphin	
1945	Sherlock Holmes and the House of Fear	Dr. John H. Watson	
1945	The Corn Is Green	The Squire	
1945	Son of Lassie	Duke of Rudling	
1945	The Woman in Green	Dr. John H. Watson	
1945	Pursuit to Algiers	Dr. John H. Watson	
1946	Terror by Night	Dr. John H. Watson	
1946	Dressed to Kill	Dr. John H. Watson	
1947	The Two Mrs. Carrolls	Dr. Tuttle	
1947	The Exile	Sir Edward Hyde	
1948	Julia Misbehaves	Col. Bruce "Bunny" Willowbrook	
1950	Vendetta	Sir Thomas Nevil	
1952	Hong Kong	Mr. Lighton	
1952	Limelight	Postant, an Impresario	
1952	Bwana Devil	Dr. Angus McLean	
1954	World for Ransom	Governor Sir Charles Coutts	Released posthumously

== See also ==
- List of Old Abingdonians
