= The Hound of the Baskervilles (1939 film) =

1939 film by Sidney Lanfield

- Theatrical release poster
- Directed by: Sidney Lanfield
- Screenplay by: Ernest Pascal
- Based on: The Hound of the Baskervilles; 1902 novel by Arthur Conan Doyle
- Produced by: Gene Markey; Darryl F. Zanuck
- Starring: Richard Greene; Basil Rathbone; Wendy Barrie; Nigel Bruce
- Cinematography: Peverell Marley
- Edited by: Robert Simpson
- Music by: David Buttolph; Charles Maxwell; Cyril J. Mockridge; David Raksin
- Production company: 20th Century Fox
- Distributed by: 20th Century Fox
- Release date: March 31, 1939
- Running time: 80 minutes
- Country: United States
- Language: English

The Hound of the Baskervilles is a 1939 American gothic mystery film based on the 1902 Sherlock Holmes novel of the same name by Sir Arthur Conan Doyle. Directed by Sidney Lanfield, the film stars Basil Rathbone as Holmes and Nigel Bruce as Dr. John Watson. Released by 20th Century Fox, it is the first of fourteen Sherlock Holmes films released between 1939 and 1946 starring Rathbone and Bruce.

Among the most-known cinematic adaptations of the novel, the film co-stars Richard Greene as Henry Baskerville (who received top billing, as the studio was unsure of the potential of a film about Sherlock Holmes) and Wendy Barrie as Beryl Stapleton.

The Hound of the Baskervilles is notable as the first Sherlock Holmes film to be set in the Victorian period like the original books. All known previous Holmes films, up to and including the 1930s British film series starring Arthur Wontner as Holmes, had been updated to a setting contemporaneous with the films' release.

== Plot ==
In 1889, Sherlock Holmes and Dr. John H. Watson receive a visit from Dr. James Mortimer, who wishes to consult them before the arrival of Sir Henry Baskerville, the last of the Baskervilles, heir to the Baskerville estate in Devonshire. Dr. Mortimer is anxious about letting Sir Henry go to Baskerville Hall, and talks about the events of the recent death of his best friend, Sir Charles Baskerville, Sir Henry's uncle. Although he was found dead in his garden from heart failure, Mortimer noticed the footprints of a gigantic hound. He tells the story of a supposed family curse, the legend of the Hound of the Baskervilles, a demonic dog that first killed Sir Hugo Baskerville several hundred years ago and is said to have caused the death of many Baskervilles in the region of Devonshire. Though Holmes dismisses the curse, he agrees to meet Sir Henry, who receives a message warning him to stay away from the moor. Holmes witnesses someone attempt to shoot Sir Henry. Holmes asks Watson to go to Baskerville Hall along with Sir Henry, claiming that he is too busy to accompany them himself. The first night, Sir Henry and Watson discover Barryman, the butler, signalling from a window with a candle to someone on the moor. After unsuccessfully catching a man fleeing across the moor, Watson and Sir Henry are startled by hound-like howls. The next day, Watson is suspicious of the neighbour Jack Stapleton, a local naturalist, while Sir Henry becomes attracted to Beryl Stapleton, the step-sister of Jack Stapleton.

Watson and Sir Henry attend a séance held by Mrs. Mortimer. In a trance, she asks, "What happened that night on the moor, Sir Charles?" They are troubled by hound-like howls. Watson meets a crippled peddler, limping on each of his legs, and receives a message to come see him. The peddler reveals himself to be Holmes, having been on the moor all the time making his own investigation. The hound kills a man on the moor whom Holmes and Watson fear is Sir Henry but turns out to be the man Barryman was signaling to; Holmes explains that it was a convicted murderer, who escaped from Dartmoor Prison, and was Mrs. Barryman's brother, who had given him Sir Henry's clothes.

Stapleton kept a huge, half-starved, vicious dog trained to attack individual members of the Baskervilles after prolonged exposure to their scent. When the hound is finally sent to kill Sir Henry Baskerville, Holmes and Watson arrive to save him just in time, killing the hound. Stapleton traps Holmes down in the hound's underground kennel, and sends Watson on an errand to meet Holmes. Holmes cuts his way out of the kennel and returns to the hall and destroys the poison that Stapleton had just given to Sir Henry as a medication for his wounds. Holmes surmises that Stapleton is a Baskerville, who hopes to claim their vast fortune himself after removing all other members of the bloodline. Stapleton pulls a gun and flees. Holmes says ominously to Watson, "He won't get very far. I've posted constables along the roads and the only other way is across the Grimpen Mire." Holmes is praised for his work on the case, and he turns in.

== Cast ==
- Basil Rathbone as Sherlock Holmes
- Nigel Bruce as Dr. John H. Watson
- Richard Greene as Sir Henry Baskerville
- Wendy Barrie as Beryl Stapleton
- Morton Lowry as Jack Stapleton
- Lionel Atwill as Dr. Mortimer
- John Carradine as Barryman
- Eily Malyon as Mrs. Barryman
- Barlowe Borland as Frankland
- Beryl Mercer as Mrs. Jenifer Mortimer
- Ralph Forbes as Sir Hugo Baskerville
- E. E. Clive as Cabby in London
- Lionel Pape as Coroner
- Nigel De Brulier as Convict (as Nigel de Brulier)
- Mary Gordon as Mrs. Hudson
- Ian Maclaren as Sir Charles Baskerville

== Production ==
There are several significant changes in plot details. Among them:

- Beryl Stapleton is Jack Stapleton's wife in the novel and is playing the part of his sister and is an unwilling participant in his crimes. In the film, she is Stapleton's stepsister, and is completely unaware of his criminal actions until Holmes reveals the truth. Ms. Stapleton falls in love with Sir Henry and engages to marry him in the film. Her relationship with Sir Henry is left open ended in the novel.
- The film has a séance performed by Dr. Mortimer's wife. This scene never appeared in the original novel. Frankland's estranged daughter, Laura Lyons and Inspector Lestrade are omitted from the film.
- The butler was named Barrymore in the novel, but possibly because of the existence of the real-life John Barrymore of the Barrymore family theatrical dynasty, his name was changed to Barryman in the film.

== Reception ==
In a contemporary review, the Monthly Film Bulletin described the film as an "excellent film version of the novel", noting that the film's elements "sustain the suspense until the exciting climax", and that "the atmosphere is extremely well contrived". Basil Rathbone and Nigel Bruce were praised for their roles, while "only Wendy Barrie seems lifeless as Beryl in a cast which is uniformly good". Pauline Kael called it a "handsome, gripping, semi-serious version of the Conan Doyle story ..." British critic Leslie Halliwell gave it two of four stars: "Basil Rathbone's first appearance as Sherlock Holmes is in a painstaking studio production which achieves good atmosphere and preserves the flavour if not the letter of the book but is let down by a curious lack of pace."

=== Awards and honors ===
American Film Institute recognition

- 2001 - AFI's 100 Years...100 Thrills - Nominated
- 2003 - AFI's 100 Years...100 Heroes & Villains:
  - Sherlock Holmes and Dr. Watson - Nominated Heroes
- 2008 - AFI's 10 Top 10 - Nominated Mystery Film

== See also ==
- Sherlock Holmes (1939 film series)
- Adaptations of Sherlock Holmes in cinema

== Bibliography ==
- Miller, Ron. Mystery Classics on Film: The Adaptation of 65 Novels and Stories. McFarland, 2017.
