= A Yank in the R.A.F. =

1941 film by Henry King

- Theatrical release poster
- Directed by: Henry King
- Screenplay by: Karl Tunberg; Darrell Ware
- Story by: Melville Crossman
- Produced by: Darryl F. Zanuck
- Starring: Tyrone Power; Betty Grable; John Sutton
- Cinematography: Leon Shamroy
- Edited by: Barbara McLean
- Music by: Alfred Newman
- Production company: 20th Century-Fox
- Distributed by: 20th Century-Fox
- Release date: September 25, 1941
- Running time: 98 minutes
- Country: United States
- Language: English
- Budget: $200,000
- Box office: $2 million (rentals)

A Yank in the R.A.F. is a 1941 American war drama film directed by Henry King and starring Tyrone Power, Betty Grable and John Sutton. Released three months before the attack on Pearl Harbor plunged the United States into World War II, it is considered a typical early-World War II production. Originally titled The Eagle Squadron, it is based on a story by "Melville Crossman", the pen name for then-20th Century-Fox studio chief Darryl F. Zanuck. It follows an American pilot who joins the Royal Air Force (RAF), during a period when the United States was still neutral.

== Plot ==
In 1940, American-built North American Harvard training aircraft are flown to the border with Canada, where they are towed across the frontier for use by Britain. (The procedure is necessary to avoid violating the Neutrality Acts, as the United States is still neutral.) Cocky American pilot Tim Baker decides to fly across the border to Trenton, Ontario, and winds up in trouble with the military authorities, unconvincingly claiming he was looking for Trenton, New Jersey. The officer in charge suggests he ferry Lockheed Hudson bombers to Britain instead, pocketing $1,000 per trip.

In London, he runs into his on-again off-again girlfriend Carol Brown, who works in the Women's Auxiliary Air Force by day and stars in a nightclub by night. She is none too pleased to see him, calling him a "worm" for his womanizing ways, lying, and long absence, but he is confident she still harbors strong feelings for him.

He decides to enlist in the Royal Air Force (RAF). Meanwhile, Brown attracts the appreciative attention of two RAF officers, Wing Commander John Morley and Flying Officer Roger Pillby. Morley persists in seeing Brown, despite being told at the outset that there is another man. Pillby is unable to persuade either Baker or Morley to introduce him.

After completing training, Baker is disappointed to be assigned to Morley's bomber squadron, rather than one equipped with fighters. He becomes further disgruntled when his first mission is to "bomb" Berlin with propaganda leaflets as Morley's co-pilot during the Phoney War. Pillby pilots another bomber in the raid.

When Baker is late for their date (sidetracked by meeting an old buddy from America), Brown accepts Morley's invitation to spend a weekend at his country estate. There, Morley asks her to marry him. When she tells Baker about it (without revealing who her suitor is), he offers to marry her himself, but in an insultingly casual way. She tells him that they are through. Back at the base, the two rivals learn of each other's involvement with the same woman. Before they can do anything about it, however, the Germans invade the Netherlands and Belgium, and they are given an urgent mission to bomb Dortmund, Germany, this time with real ordnance.

During the nighttime raid, their bomber is hit, disabling one of their two engines. Pillby descends to their aid, knocking out searchlights, but is shot down in flames and perishes. Morley orders his crew to bail out, but Baker disobeys and lands the aircraft on a Dutch beach. Spotting a line of advancing German soldiers, they hide in a nearby building, only to be taken prisoner by a German officer there. A crewman sacrifices himself, enabling the other two to dispatch the German and escape by motorboat.

Baker wakes up in a British hospital, the victim of exposure. Once discharged, he goes to see Brown, pretending to have a broken arm, but shows himself to be a liar once more. Nonetheless, he produces an engagement ring and forces it onto her finger. After receiving a telephone call from Morley breaking their date, Brown informs Baker that all leaves have been canceled.

Reserves are called up to make up fighter pilot losses, and Baker is reassigned to a Spitfire for the Battle of Dunkirk. He downs two Luftwaffe fighters before being shot down. Carol cannot hide her distress when she cannot find out whether he is alive or not. Morley takes her to the docks, where ships returning from the Dunkirk beaches are bringing back survivors. When Baker debarks, Carol rushes to him and shows him she is still wearing his ring.

== Cast ==
As appearing in screen credits (main roles identified):

- Tyrone Power as Tim Baker
- Betty Grable as Carol Brown
- John Sutton as Wing Commander John Morley
- Reginald Gardiner as Flying Officer Roger Pillby
- Donald Stuart as Corporal Harry Baker
- Ralph Byrd as Al
- Richard Fraser as Thorndyke
- Denis Green as Flight Lieutenant Redmond
- Bruce Lester as Flight Lieutenant Richardson
- Gilchrist Stuart as Wales
- Lester Matthews as Group Captain
- Frederick Worlock as Canadian Major
- Ethel Griffies as Lady Fitzhugh
- Morton Lowry as Squadron Leader Macbeth
- Fortunio Bonanova as Headwaiter
- James Craven as Instructor
- Dennis Hoey as Intelligence Officer
- Claud Allister as Officer-Motorist (uncredited)
- Charles Irwin as Uniformed Man (uncredited)

== Production ==
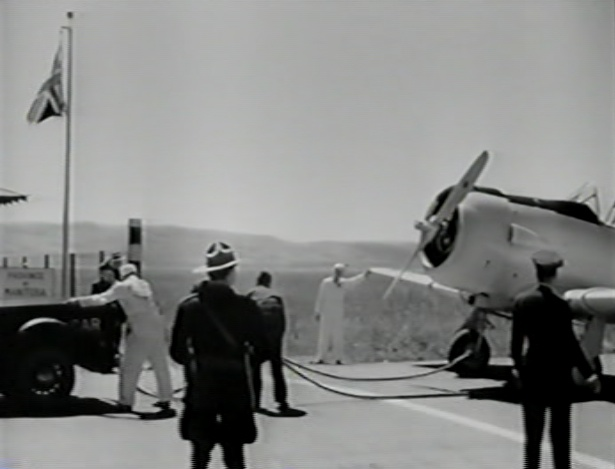
The opening scene depicts a true incident where U.S. aircraft were towed across the Canada–US border.

With principal photography shot from April to July 1941, A Yank in the R.A.F. leaned heavily on the headline news of the Battle of Britain. The film begins with U.S. North American Harvard trainers arriving very near the U.S./Canada border at the Emerson, Manitoba crossing, as a means of complying with provisions of the Neutrality Acts prohibiting aid to combatants. The depiction of R.C.M.P. and R.C.A.F. officials meeting the aircraft as they were towed across the border is a bit of Hollywood license, but the incident is mainly accurate, although aircraft were usually towed by a team of horses rather than motor vehicles.

The sequence showing the Dunkirk evacuation was filmed at Point Mugu, California, and involved more than 1,000 extras. (Note: The scenes of the Dunkirk evacuation were impressive and have been used in numerous documentary features.) The film was shot entirely on Hollywood sound stages, Twentieth Century-Fox back lots, and locations in California.

With complete cooperation from the RAF, including extensive use of RAF stock footage, the studio was allowed to film actual aerial battles shot by a camera-equipped aircraft. (Note: Two Fox cinematographers, Otto Kanturek and Jack Parry, were killed during the production when their Avro Anson aircraft was involved in a midair collision with a Hawker Hurricane.) In the original version of the film, the hero (Power), died at Dunkirk, but after the RAF expressed concerns that morale would be jeopardized, the scene was re-shot, with Baker surviving. Herbert Mason, a recipient of the Military Cross for his gallantry in the Battle of the Somme, directed the RAF flying sequences. He was credited onscreen as Major Herbert Mason.

In order to stage some of the airfield scenes realistically, the prop department turned out a group of accurate Spitfire and Messerschmitt replica fighters to go along with actual Lockheed Hudson bombers built in the nearby Lockheed factory at Burbank, California. All the flying sequences were under the direction of long-time Hollywood pilot Paul Mantz, whose team of stunt pilots included Frank Clarke.

The screen credits read "Tyrone Power with Betty Grable". The pairing of Twentieth Century-Fox's two leading stars was an opportunity to cash in on the studio's bankable star-power and to promote Grable in more serious roles. In reality, A Yank in the R.A.F. was a mélange of light romantic musical and wartime drama. According to Robert Osborne, Power felt that Grable's song-and-dance numbers were out of place in the film, but Grable, believing her popularity was based on her singing, dancing, and well-known bare legs, got her way, and the scenes remained.

== Reception ==
Despite the studio's insistence that it was a light-hearted look at war and not a propaganda film, A Yank in the R.A.F. joined the ranks of films that focused on the activities of Americans who had already gone to war, including Warner Brothers' Captains of the Clouds and the British/American production, Flying Fortress. It gave Grable dramatic scenes that expanded her range; a crying scene reportedly took more than six hours to film.

When released in September 1941, A Yank in the R.A.F. was popular with audiences and critics alike. The New York Times reviewer Bosley Crowther considered it a, "... thoroughly enjoyable show ... thrilling" and filled with "pulsing action".

It was 20th Century Fox's second-most successful film of 1941, after the Academy Award-winning How Green Was My Valley.

Some contemporary reviewers are more critical, decrying the unrealistic portrayal of Britain at war. Recent re-releases on video and the 2002 DVD also brought negative reviews citing its content and the filmmaker's approach to such a serious subject. Other modern reviews remain positive. Allmovie notes that: "The action sequences are quite gripping and very well done. The special effects work for the time is top notch, and the cinematography is very effective."

A Yank in the R.A.F. was nominated for the Oscar for Best Special Effects (Fred Sersen, Edmund H. Hansen) at the 14th Academy Awards.

== Home media ==
A Yank in the R.A.F. was released on DVD on May 21, 2002, in the U.S. and May 3, 2004, in the U.K. (followed by another release on March 12, 2012). It was also released on September 4, 2000, in the U.K. as part of a Tyrone Power Collection box set.

== See also ==
- Billy Fiske, an American in the RAF during the Battle of Britain
- Bertie Lewis, an American who served in RAF Bomber Command
- Eagle Squadrons, RAF units formed with volunteer American pilots
- International Squadron
- Eagle Squadron
- Higher Than a Kite
- Captains of the Clouds
