= The Adventures of Sherlock Holmes (film) =

1939 film by Alfred L. Werker

- 1939 US theatrical poster
- Directed by: Alfred L. Werker
- Written by: Edwin Blum; William A. Drake
- Based on: Characters: Arthur Conan Doyle; Play: William Gillette
- Produced by: Darryl F. Zanuck
- Starring: Basil Rathbone; Nigel Bruce; Ida Lupino; George Zucco; Alan Marshal
- Cinematography: Leon Shamroy
- Edited by: Robert Bischoff
- Music by: Robert Russell Bennett (uncredited); David Buttolph (uncredited); Cyril J. Mockridge (uncredited); David Raksin (uncredited); Walter Scharf (uncredited)
- Distributed by: 20th Century-Fox
- Release date: September 1, 1939
- Running time: 81 minutes
- Country: United States
- Language: English

The Adventures of Sherlock Holmes (released theatrically as Sherlock Holmes in the United Kingdom) is a 1939 American mystery adventure film based on Sir Arthur Conan Doyle's Sherlock Holmes detective stories. Although claiming to be an adaptation of the 1899 play Sherlock Holmes by William Gillette, the film bears little resemblance to the play.

Released by 20th Century-Fox, the film is the second of fourteen Sherlock Holmes films produced between 1939 and 1946, starring Basil Rathbone as Sherlock Holmes and Nigel Bruce as Dr. John Watson. The Adventures of Sherlock Holmes is the last film in the series to be released by Fox as well as the final film to be set in the Victorian period of Doyle's stories (all subsequent Holmes films would be released by Universal Pictures and set in contemporaneous times (i.e. the 1940s).

The film co-stars George Zucco as Holmes's nemesis, Professor Moriarty, and follows Holmes and Watson as they attempt to foil Moriarty's plans to target a wealthy family and steal the Crown Jewels.

== Plot ==
In 1894, Moriarty and Sherlock Holmes verbally spar on the steps outside the Old Bailey, where Moriarty has just been acquitted on a charge of murder owing to lack of evidence. Holmes remarks, "You have a magnificent brain, Moriarty. I admire it. I admire it so much I'd like to present it, pickled in alcohol, to the London Medical Society." "It would make an impressive exhibit," replies Moriarty.

Holmes and Watson are visited at 221B Baker Street by Ann Brandon. She tells him that her brother Lloyd has received a strange note: a drawing of a man with an albatross hanging around his neck, identical to one received by her father just before his brutal murder ten years before. Holmes deduces that the note is a warning and rushes to find Lloyd Brandon. He is too late, as Lloyd has been murdered by being strangled and having his skull crushed.

Holmes, disguised as a music-hall entertainer, attends a garden party, where he correctly believes an attempt will be made on Ann's life. Hearing her cries from a nearby park, he captures her assailant, who turns out to be Gabriel Mateo, out for revenge on the Brandons for the murder of his father by Ann's father in a dispute over ownership of their South American mine. His murder weapon was a bola. Mateo also reveals that it was Moriarty who urged him to seek revenge.

Holmes realises that Moriarty is using the case as a distraction from his real crime, one that will stir the British Empire: an attempt to steal the Crown Jewels. Holmes rushes to the Tower of London, where, during a struggle, Moriarty falls, presumably to his death. In the end, Ann is married and Holmes tries to shoo a fly by playing the violin, only to have Watson swat it with his newspaper, remarking, "Elementary, my dear Holmes, elementary."

== Cast ==
- Basil Rathbone as Sherlock Holmes
- Nigel Bruce as Dr. Watson
- Ida Lupino as Ann Brandon
- George Zucco as Professor Moriarty
- Alan Marshal as Jerrold Hunter
- Terry Kilburn as Billy
- Henry Stephenson as Sir Ronald Ramsgate
- E. E. Clive as Inspector Bristol
- Arthur Hohl as Bassick
- Mary Forbes as Lady Conyngham
- Peter Willes as Lloyd Brandon
- Mary Gordon as Mrs. Hudson
- Frank Dawson as Dawes
- George Regas as Mateo
- William Austin as Passerby
- Holmes Herbert as Justice of the Court

== Background ==
The film was supposedly based on the stage play by William Gillette, though little of the play's original plot remains aside from the Holmes/Moriarty conflict. The play featured a very young Charlie Chaplin in one of his very first acting roles during its first London production, playing the character of Billy, who, in this movie, is played by Terry Kilburn.

== Accolades ==
The line "Elementary, my dear Watson" was made popular by this film. Although it was spoken in the 1929 talkie The Return of Sherlock Holmes starring Clive Brook and in the films featuring Arthur Wontner, it was never featured in a canonical Arthur Conan Doyle story, although Holmes once said "Elementary" in the 1893 story "The Adventure of the Crooked Man".

It was ranked 65th in the American Film Institute 2005 list AFI's 100 Years...100 Movie Quotes.

== Influence ==
The scene in which Holmes experiments with the flies in the glass while playing the violin is recreated in the 2009 film Sherlock Holmes, in which Holmes is played by Robert Downey Jr.

In the episode "The Reichenbach Fall" of the BBC/PBS series, Sherlock is heavily inspired by the film and other Rathbone-Bruce films (creators Steven Moffat and Mark Gatiss have named the films as the show's primary inspiration).

== See also ==
- Sherlock Holmes (1939 film series)
