= List of actors who have played Mrs. Hudson =

The following is a list of actors (Note: As in the corresponding articles for other Sherlock Holmes characters, the gender-neutral term actors is used in this article. Also note that this list includes male actors, namely Junichi Suwabe and David Wald.) who have played Mrs. Hudson in various media.

== Radio and audio dramas ==
Name	Title	Date	Type
Mary Gordon	The New Adventures of Sherlock Holmes	1945–1946	Radio (Mutual)
Dora Gregory	The Adventure of the Speckled Band	1945	BBC Home Service
Susan Richards	The Adventure of the Speckled Band	1948	BBC Home Service
Elizabeth Maude	The Adventures of Sherlock Holmes – "The Dying Detective", "The Second Stain"	1954	BBC Light Programme
Elsa Palmer	The Sign of Four	1959	BBC Light Programme
Kathleen Helme	Sherlock Holmes – "The Naval Treaty"	1960	BBC Light Programme
Penelope Lee	Sherlock Holmes – "The Valley of Fear"	1960	BBC Home Service
Gudrun Ure	Sherlock Holmes – "The Empty House"	1961	BBC Light Programme
Beryl Calder	Sherlock Holmes – "Thor Bridge"	1962	BBC Light Programme
Barbara Mitchell	Sherlock Holmes (4 stories)	1962–1967	BBC radio
Grizelda Hervey	Sherlock Holmes – "The Sign of the Four"	1963	BBC Home Service
Janet Morrison	Sherlock Holmes (7 stories)	1964–1969	BBC radio
Cecile Chevreau	Sherlock Holmes – "Charles Augustus Milverton"	1970	LP record audio drama
Barbara Atkinson	The Hound of the Baskervilles	1988	BBC Radio 4
Anna Cropper	Sherlock Holmes – A Study in Scarlet, The Sign of the Four	1989	BBC Radio 4
Mary Allen	Sherlock Holmes – "A Scandal in Bohemia", "The Noble Bachelor"	1990–1991	BBC Radio 4
Joan Matheson	Sherlock Holmes (7 stories)	1992–1995	BBC Radio 4
Judi Dench	Sherlock Holmes – The Hound of the Baskervilles	1998	BBC Radio 4
Lee Paasch	The Further Adventures of Sherlock Holmes	1998–2013	Radio (Imagination Theatre)
Lee Paasch	The Classic Adventures of Sherlock Holmes	2005–2012	Radio (Imagination Theatre)
June Whitfield	The Newly Discovered Casebook of Sherlock Holmes	1999	BBC Radio 2
Beth Chalmers	Sherlock Holmes	2011–2012	Audio dramas (Big Finish Productions)
Moira Quirk	The Hound of the Baskervilles	2014	Audio drama (L.A. Theatre Works)
Patricia Hodge	Mrs Hudson's Radio Show	2018	BBC Radio 4
Ellen McLain	The Further Adventures of Sherlock Holmes	2019–present	Radio (Imagination Theatre)

== Stage plays ==
Name	Title	Date	Type
Esmé Hubbard	The Return of Sherlock Holmes	1923	Stage play
Paddy Edwards	Baker Street	1965	Stage musical
Toni Lamond	Sherlock's Last Case	1984–1985	Stage play
Julia Sutton	Sherlock Holmes: The Musical	1989	Stage musical
Jane Pfitsch	Baskerville: A Sherlock Holmes Mystery	2015	Stage play
Margaret Cabourn-Smith	Sherlock Holmes and The 12 Days of Christmas	2025-2026	Stage (Britain)

== Television and DTV films ==
Name	Title	Date	Type
Violet Besson	The Three Garridebs	1937	Television play for NBC (American)
Marguerite Young	Doctor Watson and the Darkwater Hall Mystery	1974	Television film (British)
Marjorie Bennett	Sherlock Holmes in New York	1976	Television film (American)
Rina Zelyonaya	The Adventures of Sherlock Holmes and Dr. Watson	1979–1986	TV film series (USSR)
Lynn Rainbow	Sherlock Holmes and the Sign of Four	1983	Animated television film (Australian)
Jenny Laird	The Masks of Death	1984	Television film (British)
Margaret John	Sherlock Holmes and the Leading Lady	1991	Television films
Margaret John	Incident at Victoria Falls	1992	Television films
Kathleen McAuliffe	The Royal Scandal	2001	Television films (Canadian)
Kathleen McAuliffe	The Case of the Whitechapel Vampire	2002	Television films (Canadian)
Anne Carroll	Sherlock Holmes and the Case of the Silk Stocking	2004	Television film (British)
Catriona McDonald	Sherlock Holmes	2010	DTV film (American)
Emily Gray	Case Closed: The Phantom of Baker Street	2010	Japanese anime film (English dub, released on DVD)

== Television series ==
Name	Title	Date	Type
Iris Vandeleur	Sherlock Holmes	1951	TV series (British)
Mary Holder	Sherlock Holmes – "The Speckled Band"	1964	TV episode (British)
Enid Lindsey	Sherlock Holmes	1965	TV series (British)
Grace Arnold	Sir Arthur Conan Doyle's Sherlock Holmes	1968	TV series (British)
Camila Ashland	Fantasy Island – "The Case Against Mr. Roarke/Save Sherlock Holmes"	1982	TV episode (American)
Jane Lowe	Young Sherlock: The Mystery of the Manor House	1982	TV series (British)
Pat Keen	The Baker Street Boys	1983	TV series (British)
Rosalie Williams	Sherlock Holmes	1984–1994	TV series (British)
Yōko Asagami	Sherlock Hound	1984–1985	TV animated series (Italian-Japanese) (Japanese version)
Patricia Parris	Sherlock Hound	1984–1985	TV animated series (Italian-Japanese) (English dub)
Cristina Grado	Sherlock Hound	1984–1985	TV animated series (Italian-Japanese) (Italian dub)
Bunty Webb	Alfred Hitchcock Presents – "My Dear Watson"	1989	TV episode (American)
Jan Hooks	Saturday Night Live – "Sherlock Holmes' Birthday Party"	1991	TV sketch (American)
Una Stubbs	Sherlock	2010–2017	TV series (British)
Candis Cayne	Elementary	2013–2014	TV series (American)
Ingeborga Dapkūnaitė	Sherlock Holmes	2013	TV series (Russian)
Keiko Horiuchi	Sherlock Holmes	2014–2015	TV series (Japanese)
Ran Itō	Miss Sherlock	2018	TV series (Japanese)
Rino Katase	Sherlock: Untold Stories	2019	TV series (Japanese)
Junichi Suwabe	Case File nº221: Kabukicho	2019–2020	TV anime series (Japanese) (Japanese version)
David Wald	Case File nº221: Kabukicho	2019–2020	TV anime series (Japanese) (English dub)
Kana Asumi	Moriarty the Patriot	2020–2021	TV anime series (Japanese)
Suzie Yeung	Moriarty the Patriot	2020–2021	TV anime series (Japanese) (English dub)
Mary O'Driscoll	Sherlock & Daughter	2025	TV series (American)

== Theatrical films ==
Name	Title	Date	Type
Madame d'Esterre	20 short films	1921–1923	Stoll series silent films (British)
Madame d'Esterre	The Hound of the Baskervilles	1921	Stoll series silent films (British)
Madame d'Esterre	The Sign of the Four	1923	Stoll series silent films (British)
Minnie Rayner	The Sleeping Cardinal	1931	1931–1937 film series (British)
Minnie Rayner	The Missing Rembrandt	1932	1931–1937 film series (British)
Minnie Rayner	The Triumph of Sherlock Holmes	1935	1931–1937 film series (British)
Minnie Rayner	Silver Blaze	1937	1931–1937 film series (British)
Marie Ault	The Speckled Band	1931	British film
Clare Greet	The Sign of Four	1932	1931–1937 film series (British)
Tempe Pigott	A Study in Scarlet	1933	American film
Mary Gordon	The Hound of the Baskervilles	1939	1939–1946 film series (USA)
Mary Gordon	The Adventures of Sherlock Holmes	1939	1939–1946 film series (USA)
Mary Gordon	Sherlock Holmes and the Voice of Terror	1942	1939–1946 film series (USA)
Mary Gordon	Sherlock Holmes and the Secret Weapon	1942	1939–1946 film series (USA)
Mary Gordon	Sherlock Holmes in Washington	1943	1939–1946 film series (USA)
Mary Gordon	Sherlock Holmes Faces Death	1943	1939–1946 film series (USA)
Mary Gordon	The Spider Woman	1944	1939–1946 film series (USA)
Mary Gordon	The Pearl of Death	1944	1939–1946 film series (USA)
Mary Gordon	The Woman in Green	1945	1939–1946 film series (USA)
Mary Gordon	Dressed to Kill	1946	1939–1946 film series (USA)
E. Schultze-Westrum	Sherlock Holmes and the Deadly Necklace	1962	West German-French-Italian film
Barbara Leake	A Study in Terror	1965	British film
Irene Handl	The Private Life of Sherlock Holmes	1970	American film
Alison Leggatt	The Seven-Per-Cent Solution	1976	American film
Betty Woolfe	Murder by Decree	1979	British-Canadian film
Pat Keen	Without a Clue	1988	British film
Kei Hayami	Case Closed: The Phantom of Baker Street	2002	Japanese anime film (Japanese version)
Geraldine James	Sherlock Holmes	2009	British–American films
Geraldine James	Sherlock Holmes: A Game of Shadows	2011	British–American films
Sarah Crowden	Mr. Holmes	2015	British–American film
Kelly Macdonald	Holmes & Watson	2018	American film

== Video games ==
Name	Title	Date	Type
Diana Montano	The Lost Files of Sherlock Holmes: The Case of the Serrated Scalpel	1992	Voice role
Coralie Persee	The Lost Files of Sherlock Holmes: The Case of the Rose Tattoo	1996	Voice role; digitized sprites based on a different actor
Stella Gonet	Sherlock Holmes: Crimes & Punishments	2014	Sherlock Holmes series; voice role
Unknown actor	Sherlock Holmes: The Devil's Daughter	2016	Sherlock Holmes series; voice role

== See also ==
- List of actors who have played Sherlock Holmes
- List of actors who have played Dr. Watson
- List of actors who have played Inspector Lestrade
- List of actors who have played Irene Adler
- List of actors who have played Mycroft Holmes
- List of actors who have played Professor Moriarty
