= List of actors who have played Inspector Lestrade =

The following is a list of actors who have played Inspector Lestrade in various media.

== Radio and audio dramas ==
Name	Title	Date	Type
Arthur Bush	The Boscombe Valley Mystery	1943	BBC Home Service
Frederick Worlock	The New Adventures of Sherlock Holmes	1944–1946	Radio (Mutual)
Bernard Lenrow	The New Adventures of Sherlock Holmes	1947–1948	Radio (Mutual)
Horace Braham	The New Adventures of Sherlock Holmes	1948–1949	Radio (Mutual)
John Cazabon	The Adventures of Sherlock Holmes	1954	BBC Light Programme
Felix Felton	Sherlock Holmes – "The Bruce-Partington Plans"	1954	BBC Home Service
Paul Lorraine	Sherlock Holmes – The Hound of the Baskervilles Part 6	1958	BBC Light Programme
Frederick Treves	Sherlock Holmes – "The Noble Bachelor"	1959	BBC Light Programme
David Bird	Sherlock Holmes – "The Cardboard Box"	1960	BBC Light Programme
Humphrey Morton	Sherlock Holmes (10 stories)	1961–1967	BBC Light Programme
Godfrey Kenton	Sherlock Holmes – "A Study in Scarlet"	1962	BBC Home Service
Alan Dudley	Sherlock Holmes – "Charles Augustus Milverton", "The Norwood Builder"	1970–1971	LP record series
John Hollis	A Study in Scarlet	1974	BBC Radio 4
John Hollis	Sherlock Holmes – "Charles Augustus Milverton", "The Six Napoleons"	1978	BBC Radio 4
Ian Martin	CBS Radio Mystery Theater – "A Study in Scarlet", "The Boscombe Valley Mystery"	1977	CBS Radio
William Griffis	CBS Radio Mystery Theater – "The Adventure of the Blue Carbuncle"	1977	CBS Radio
Nicholas Courtney	Sherlock Holmes vs. Dracula	1981	BBC radio dramatisation of the novel
Donald Gee	BBC Radio Sherlock Holmes (7 stories)	1989–1993	BBC Radio 4
Stephen Thorne	BBC Radio Sherlock Holmes (4 stories)	1994–1995	BBC Radio 4
Stephen Thorne	The Further Adventures of Sherlock Holmes (British series)	2004–2009	BBC Radio 4
Rick May	The Further Adventures of Sherlock Holmes (American series)	1998–2020	Radio series (Imagination Theatre)
Rick May	The Classic Adventures of Sherlock Holmes	2005–2016	Radio series (Imagination Theatre)
Jeffrey Holland	The Newly Discovered Casebook of Sherlock Holmes	1999	BBC Radio 2
John Banks	Sherlock Holmes	2011–2014	Audio dramas (Big Finish Productions)
James Fleet	The Rivals	2011, 2015–2016	BBC Radio 4
Tim Pigott-Smith	The Rivals	2013	BBC Radio 4
Bob Cryer	Mrs Hudson's Radio Show	2018	BBC Radio 4
Josh Robert Thompson	Moriarty: The Devil's Game	2022	Audio drama (Audible Original)
Sharon D. Clarke	Sherlock & Co.	2025-	Scripted podcast
Jasmine Kerr	Sherlock & Co.	2026-	Scripted podcast
Norman Eshley	Sir Sherlock: The Red Letter Day	TBA	Audio drama (British)

== Stage plays ==
Name	Title	Date	Type
Paul Gill	The Return of Sherlock Holmes	1923	Stage (Princes Theatre)
Daniel Keyes	Baker Street	1965	Stage musical (Broadway)
Edward Zang	The Crucifer of Blood	1978	Stage (Broadway)
John Cater	The Crucifer of Blood	1979	Stage (London)
Ian Abercrombie	The Crucifer of Blood	1981	Stage (Los Angeles)
Roger Llewellyn	Sherlock Holmes: The Musical	1988	Northcott Theatre (Exeter, England)
Michael Glenn	Baskerville: A Sherlock Holmes Mystery	2015	Arena Stage in Southwest, Washington, D.C.
John Kearns	Sherlock Holmes and The 12 Days of Christmas	2025-2026	Stage (Britain)

== Television and DTV films ==
Name	Title	Date	Type
Eustace Wyatt	The Three Garridebs	1937	Television play (American)
Alan Caillou	The Hound of the Baskervilles	1972	Television film (American)
Hubert Rees	The Hound of the Baskervilles	1982	Television serial (British)
Ronald Lacey	The Hound of the Baskervilles	1983	Television film (British)
Terence Lodge	Hands of a Murderer	1990	Television film (British)
Simon Callow	The Crucifer of Blood	1991	Television film adaptation of the play (American)
Kenneth Baker	Incident at Victoria Falls	1992	Television film
Colin Skinner	The Hound of London	1993	Television film (Luxembourg/Canada)
Neil Dudgeon	Sherlock Holmes and the Case of the Silk Stocking	2004	Television film (British)
William Huw	Sherlock Holmes	2010	DTV (American)

== Television series ==
Name	Title	Date	Type
Bill Owen	Sherlock Holmes	1951	TV series (British)
Archie Duncan	Sherlock Holmes	1954–1955	TV series (American)
Peter Madden	Sherlock Holmes	1965	TV series (British)
Hans Schellbach	Sherlock Holmes	1967–1968	TV series (Germany)
William Lucas	Sir Arthur Conan Doyle's Sherlock Holmes	1968	TV series (British)
Patrick Newell	Sherlock Holmes and Doctor Watson	1979–1980	TV series (Polish-American)
Boryslav Brondukov	The Adventures of Sherlock Holmes and Dr. Watson	1979–1986	TV film series (USSR)
Ian Abercrombie	Fantasy Island – "The Case Against Mr. Roarke/Save Sherlock Holmes"	1982	TV episode (American)
Stanley Lebor	The Baker Street Boys	1983	TV series (British)
Shōzō Iizuka	Sherlock Hound	1984–1985	TV animated series (Italian-Japanese) (Japanese version)
Lewis Arquette	Sherlock Hound	1984–1985	TV animated series (Italian-Japanese) (English dub)
Enzo Consoli	Sherlock Hound	1984–1985	TV animated series (Italian-Japanese) (Italian dub)
Colin Jeavons	Sherlock Holmes	1985–1992	TV series (British)
John Colicos	Alfred Hitchcock Presents – "My Dear Watson"	1989	TV episode (American)
Mike Myers	Saturday Night Live – "Sherlock Holmes' Birthday Party"	1991	TV sketch (American)
Rupert Graves	Sherlock	2010–2017	TV series (British)
Sean Pertwee	Elementary	2013–2014	TV series (American)
Mikhail Boyarsky	Sherlock Holmes	2013	TV series (Russian)
Daisuke Kishio	Sherlock Holmes	2014–2015	TV series (Japanese)
Kenichi Takitō	Miss Sherlock	2018	TV series (Japanese)
Kuranosuke Sasaki	Sherlock: Untold Stories	2019	TV series (Japanese)
Fuminori Komatsu	Moriarty the Patriot	2020–2021	TV anime series (Japanese)
David Matranga	Moriarty the Patriot	2021	TV anime series (English dub)
Aidan McArdle	The Irregulars	2021	TV series (British-American)
Tomoyuki Shimura	Lupin the 3rd Part 6	2021-2022	TV anime series (Japanese)
Luis Bermudez	Lupin the 3rd Part 6	2022	TV anime series (English dub)
Taiten Kusunoki	Undead Girl Murder Farce	2023	TV anime series (Japanese)
Rachel Hayward	Watson	2025-2026	TV series (American)
Scott Reid	Young Sherlock	2026	TV series (British)

== Theatrical films ==
Name	Title	Date	Type
Arthur Bell	The Tiger of San Pedro	1921	Stoll series short films (British)
Arthur Bell	The Resident Patient	1921	Stoll series short films (British)
Arthur Bell	The Noble Bachelor	1921	Stoll series short films (British)
Arthur Bell	The Empty House	1921	Stoll series short films (British)
Tom Beaumont	The Cardboard Box	1923	Stoll series short films (British)
Philip Hewland	The Sleeping Cardinal	1931	1931–1937 film series (British)
Philip Hewland	The Missing Rembrandt	1932	1931–1937 film series (British)
Alan Mowbray	A Study in Scarlet	1933	American film
Charles Mortimer	The Triumph of Sherlock Holmes	1935	1931–1937 film series (British)
John Turnbull	Silver Blaze	1937	1931–1937 film series (British)
Dennis Hoey	Sherlock Holmes and the Secret Weapon	1942	1939–1946 film series (USA)
Dennis Hoey	Sherlock Holmes Faces Death	1943	1939–1946 film series (USA)
Dennis Hoey	The Spider Woman	1944	1939–1946 film series (USA)
Dennis Hoey	The Pearl of Death	1944	1939–1946 film series (USA)
Dennis Hoey	The House of Fear	1945	1939–1946 film series (USA)
Dennis Hoey	Terror by Night	1946	1939–1946 film series (USA)
Frank Finlay	A Study in Terror	1965	British film
Frank Finlay	Murder by Decree	1979	British-Canadian film
Roger Ashton-Griffiths	Young Sherlock Holmes	1985	American film
Jeffrey Jones	Without a Clue	1988	American film
Eddie Marsan	Sherlock Holmes	2009	British-American films
Eddie Marsan	Sherlock Holmes: A Game of Shadows	2011	British-American films
Rob Brydon	Holmes & Watson	2018	American film
Adeel Akhtar	Enola Holmes	2020	American-British films
Adeel Akhtar	Enola Holmes 2	2022	American-British films
Ian Wilson	Sherlock Holmes: Mare of the Night	2025	American film
Ian Wilson	Sherlock Holmes: The Fall of Watson	TBA	American film

== Video games ==
Name	Title	Date	Type
Colin Mace	Sherlock Holmes: Crimes & Punishments	2014	Sherlock Holmes series; voice role
Harry Myers	Sherlock Holmes: The Devil's Daughter	2016	Sherlock Holmes series; voice role

Inspector Lestrade is played by unknown actors in multiple video games including the Sherlock Holmes: Consulting Detective series (1991–1993), The Case of the Serrated Scalpel (1994), The Case of the Rose Tattoo (1996), Sherlock Holmes: The Case of the Silver Earring (2004), Sherlock Holmes Versus Arsène Lupin (2007), and The Testament of Sherlock Holmes (2012).

== See also ==
- List of actors who have played Sherlock Holmes
- List of actors who have played Dr. Watson
- List of actors who have played Irene Adler
- List of actors who have played Mycroft Holmes
- List of actors who have played Mrs. Hudson
- List of actors who have played Professor Moriarty
