= Sherlock Holmes (1931 film series) =

Five films based on fictional English detective

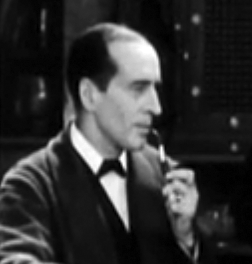
- Arthur Wontner as Sherlock Holmes
- Directed by: Leslie S. Hiscott
- Based on: The Sherlock Holmes stories by Sir Arthur Conan Doyle
- Produced by: Julius Hagen; Basil Dean
- Starring: Arthur Wontner
- Cinematography: Sydney Blythe; William Luff; Basil Emmott; Robert De Grasse; Robert Martin
- Country: United Kingdom
- Language: English

Sherlock Holmes is a film series running from 1931 to 1937. Arthur Wontner portrayed Sherlock Holmes in five films.

== Production ==
Having been told he resembled Doyle's creation for years, Wontner was finally cast in the role for The Sleeping Cardinal in 1931. Wontner was noticed after portraying Sexton Blake at the Prince Edward Theater in 1930.

Wontner was fifty-six when he began portraying Holmes and was forced to wear a toupée in the first three films to hide his bald spot. Holmes in the novels had retired at age fifty and as such, Wontner was technically too old for the part.

Produced by Twickenham Studios, The Sleeping Cardinal was loosely based on "The Adventure of the Empty House" with the noticeable change that in the film version, Ronald Adair is a card cheat. Wontner was joined by Ian Fleming as Doctor Watson and Philip Hewland as Inspector Lestrade.

The Sleeping Cardinal was well received so producer Julies Hagen rushed a second film into production. The Missing Rembrandt reunited director Leslie S. Hiscott with Wontner, Fleming, and Hewland and was released in 1932. Norman McKinnel joined the cast as Professor Moriarty. Loosely based on "The Adventure of Charles Augustus Milverton", the film altered the story converting a blackmailer to an art dealer. The Missing Rembrandt is now considered a lost film.

With the second film another success, Associated Radio Pictures lured Wontner to their studio to make The Sign of Four: Sherlock Holmes' Greatest Case which was produced and released later the same year. For this film, Fleming was replaced by younger actor Ian Hunter to better facilitate the storyline of Watson's wooing of Mary Morstan.

In 1935, Wontner returned to the role for The Triumph of Sherlock Holmes. For this film, Wontner jettisoned the toupée and Ian Fleming returned to the role of Dr. Watson. Lyn Harding took over the role of Professor Moriarty from Norman McKinnel, and Charles Mortimer took over the role of Inspector Lestrade from Philip Hewland. Wontner's age, fifty-nine by this time, was too difficult to hide so Holmes is on the verge of retiring. The film is a very accurate adaptation of The Valley of Fear. The film received rave reviews which would lead to one final film.

In 1937, Wontner's final Holmes film, Silver Blaze, was released in Britain. Ian Fleming returned for a final turn at Dr. Watson, as did Lyn Harding as Moriarty while John Turnbull became the third actor to play Inspector Lestrade. The production was far less faithful than previous films, injecting Sir Henry Baskerville from The Hound of the Baskervilles into this adaptation of "The Adventure of Silver Blaze". The film wasn't released in the U.S. until 1941 by which time it had undergone a retitle to Murder at the Baskervilles.

== Main cast ==
Character
| Character | The Sleeping Cardinal (1931) | The Missing Rembrandt (1932) | The Sign of Four (1932) | The Triumph of Sherlock Holmes (1935) | Silver Blaze (1937) |
|---|---|---|---|---|---|
| Sherlock Holmes | Arthur Wontner | Arthur Wontner | Arthur Wontner | Arthur Wontner | Arthur Wontner |
| Dr. Watson | Ian Fleming | Ian Fleming | Ian Hunter | Ian Fleming | Ian Fleming |
| Mrs. Hudson | Minnie Rayner | Minnie Rayner | Clare Greet | Minnie Rayner | Minnie Rayner |
| Professor Moriarty | Norman McKinnel | | | Lyn Harding | Lyn Harding |
| Inspector Lestrade | Philip Hewland | Philip Hewland | | Charles Mortimer | John Turnbull |
| Colonel Sebastian Moran | Louis Goodrich | | | Wilfrid Caithness | Arthur Goullet |

== Films ==
| Title | Year | Based on | Ref. |
|---|---|---|---|
| The Sleeping Cardinal (US title: Sherlock Holmes' Fatal Hour) | 1931 | "The Adventure of the Empty House" and "The Final Problem" | |
| The Missing Rembrandt (still considered lost) | 1932 | "The Adventure of Charles Augustus Milverton" | |
| The Sign of Four: Sherlock Holmes' Greatest Case | 1932 | The Sign of the Four | |
| The Triumph of Sherlock Holmes | 1935 | The Valley of Fear | |
| Silver Blaze (US title: Murder at the Baskervilles, release 1941) | 1937 | "The Adventure of Silver Blaze" | |

== Reception ==
Wontner's performances as Holmes were highly praised. Lionel Collier wrote in Picturegoer, "Arthur Wontner is a perfect Sherlock Holmes." Vincent Starrett, one of the founders of the Chicago chapter of the Baker Street Irregulars, said of Wontner's performance as Holmes, "Surely no better Sherlock Holmes than Arthur Wontner is likely to be seen and heard in pictures, in our time."

== Wontner on radio ==
Wontner's final performance as Sherlock Holmes was in a 1943 BBC adaptation of "The Boscombe Valley Mystery" with Carleton Hobbs as Dr. Watson. Hobbs himself later went on to play Holmes in the BBC 1952–1969 radio series.
