= List of actors who have played Professor Moriarty =

The following is a list of actors who have played Professor Moriarty in various media.

== Radio and audio dramas ==
Name	Title	Date	Type
Louis Hector	The Adventures of Sherlock Holmes – "The Missing Leonardo Da Vinci"	1932	Radio (NBC Blue Network)
Charles Bryant	Lux Radio Theatre – "Sherlock Holmes"	1935	Radio adaptation of the play (NBC)
Eustace Wyatt	The Mercury Theatre on the Air – "Sherlock Holmes"	1938	Radio adaptation of the play (CBS)
Joseph Kearns	The New Adventures of Sherlock Holmes – "The Singular Case of the Paradol Chamber"	1945	Radio (Mutual)
Denis Green	The New Adventures of Sherlock Holmes – "The April Fool's Adventure"	1946	Radio (Mutual)
Robert Dryden	The New Adventures of Sherlock Holmes – "The Guest in the Coffin"	1949	Radio (Mutual)
Frederick Valk	Sherlock Holmes	1953	Radio adaptation of the play (BBC)
Orson Welles	The Adventures of Sherlock Holmes – "The Final Problem"	1954	BBC Light Programme
Ralph Truman	Sherlock Holmes – "The Final Problem"	1955	BBC Home Service
Felix Felton	Sherlock Holmes – "The Final Problem"	1957	BBC Home Service
Rolf Lefebvre	Sherlock Holmes – "The Final Problem"	1967	BBC Light Programme
Michael Pennington	BBC Radio Sherlock Holmes – "The Final Problem", "The Empty House"	1992	BBC Radio 4
Ronald Pickup	BBC Radio Sherlock Holmes – The Valley of Fear	1997	BBC Radio 4
David King	The Seven-Per-Cent Solution	1993	BBC radio dramatisation of the novel
Geoffrey Whitehead	The Newly Discovered Casebook of Sherlock Holmes	1999	BBC Radio 2
Tony Jay	Sherlock Holmes Theatre	2006	Hollywood Theatre of the Ear
Nolan Palmer	The Further Adventures of Sherlock Holmes – "The Moriarty Resurrection"	2006	Radio (Imagination Theatre)
Richard Ziman	The Classic Adventures of Sherlock Holmes – "The Return of Sherlock Holmes"	2009	Radio (Imagination Theatre)
Alan Cox	Sherlock Holmes: The Final Problem/The Empty House	2011	Audio drama (Big Finish Productions)
Norman Lloyd	Sherlock Holmes	2011	California Artists Radio Theatre
Mitchell Cohen	Genius	2019–2020	Scripted podcast
Gerard McDermott	Sherlock Holmes: The Voice of Treason	2020	Audio drama (Audible Original)
Dominic Monaghan	Moriarty	2022–2026	Audio drama (Audible Original)
Karim Kronfli	Madison on the Air - "The New Adventures of Sherlock Holmes: The Adventure of the Haunted Bagpipes"	2024	Scripted podcast

== Stage plays ==
Name	Title	Date	Type
George Wessells	Sherlock Holmes	1899	Broadway (American)
Frank Keenan	Sherlock Holmes	1928	Broadway (American)
Thomas Gomez	"Sherlock Holmes" by Ouida Bergère	1953	Broadway (American)
Martin Gabel	Baker Street	1965	Stage musical (Broadway)
Terry Williams	Sherlock Holmes: The Musical	1988	Stage musical (Exeter, England)

== Television and DTV films ==
Name	Title	Date	Type
John Huston	Sherlock Holmes in New York	1976	Television film (American)
Viktor Yevgrafov	The Adventures of Sherlock Holmes and Dr. Watson	1980	Television film (USSR)
Anthony Andrews	Hands of a Murderer	1990	Television film (British)
Vincent D'Onofrio	Sherlock: Case of Evil	2002	Television film (American)
Steve Powell	Case Closed: The Phantom of Baker Street	2010	Japanese anime film (English dub, released on DVD)
Malcolm McDowell	Tom and Jerry Meet Sherlock Holmes	2010	Animated direct-to-DVD film (American)
Ethan Vaughan	Moriarty Rising: A Sherlock Holmes Tale	2027	Microdrama/feature film dual release (American-Italian)

== Television series ==
Name	Title	Date	Type
Mel Ferrer	Fantasy Island – "The Case Against Mr. Roarke/Save Sherlock Holmes"	1982	TV episode (American)
Colin Jeavons	The Baker Street Boys – "The Adventure of the Winged Scarab" Parts 1 and 2	1983	TV episodes (British)
Chikao Ōtsuka	Sherlock Hound	1984–1985	TV animated series (Italian-Japanese) (Japanese version)
Hamilton Camp	Sherlock Hound	1984–1985	TV animated series (Italian-Japanese) (English dub)
Mauro Bosco	Sherlock Hound	1984–1985	TV animated series (Italian-Japanese) (Italian dub)
Eric Porter	Sherlock Holmes	1985-1986 * (brief scenes/recapitulation in "Adventure of the Empty House" [1st episode of Hardwicke's tenure as Watson--also had David Burke repeat his role in same scenes] of famous battle over Reichenbach Falls)	TV series (British)
Daniel Davis	Star Trek: The Next Generation – "Elementary, Dear Data" and "Ship in a Bottle"	1988–1993	TV episodes (American)
Daniel Davis	Star Trek Picard - "The Bounty"	2023	TV episodes (American)
John Colicos	Alfred Hitchcock Presents – "My Dear Watson"	1989	TV episode (American)
Rodger Bumpass	The Real Ghostbusters – "Elementary My Dear Wintson"	1989	Animated TV episode (American)
Hal Rayle	Teenage Mutant Ninja Turtles – "Elementary, My Dear Turtle"	1990	Animated TV episode (American)
Richard Newman	Sherlock Holmes in the 22nd Century	1999–2001	TV series (British-American)
Andrew Scott	Sherlock	2010–2017	TV series (British)
Natalie Dormer	Elementary	2013–2015	TV series (American)
Alexey Gorbunov	Sherlock Holmes	2013	TV series (Russian)
Masashi Ebara	Sherlock Holmes	2014–2015	TV series (Japanese)
David S. Lee	The Librarians	2015	TV series (American)
Shima Ōnishi	Sherlock: Untold Stories	2019	TV series (Japanese)
Seiichirō Yamashita	Case File nº221: Kabukicho	2019–2020	TV anime series (Japanese) (Japanese version)
Justin Briner	Case File nº221: Kabukicho	2019–2020	TV anime series (Japanese) (English dub)
Sōma Saitō	Moriarty the Patriot	2020–2021	TV anime series (Japanese)
Aaron Dismuke	Moriarty the Patriot	2020–2021	TV anime series (Japanese) (English dub)
Shizuka Ishigami	Moriarty the Patriot	2020–2021	TV anime series (Japanese) (Younger version)
Emily Neves	Moriarty the Patriot	2020–2021	TV anime series (Japanese) (Younger version) (English dub)
Akira Ishida	Lupin the 3rd Part 6	2021–2022	TV anime series (Japanese)
Khoi Dao	Lupin the 3rd Part 6	2022	TV anime series (English dub)
Wataru Yokojima	Undead Girl Murder Farce	2023	TV anime series (Japanese)
Randall Park	Watson	2025	TV series (American)
Dougray Scott	Sherlock & Daughter	2025	TV series (American-British)
Dónal Finn	Young Sherlock	2026–present	TV series (British)
Javier Mejía	The Final Problem	2026	TV miniseries (Spanish)

== Theatrical films ==
Name	Title	Date	Type
Ernest Maupain	Sherlock Holmes	1916	First silent film adaptation of the stage play (American)
Booth Conway	The Valley of Fear	1916	Silent film (British)
Gustav von Seyffertitz	Sherlock Holmes	1922	Silent film adaptation of the stage play (American)
Percy Standing	The Final Problem	1923	Stoll series short silent film (British)
Harry T. Morey	The Return of Sherlock Holmes	1929	American film
Norman McKinnel	The Sleeping Cardinal	1931	1931–1937 film series (British)
Ernest Torrence	Sherlock Holmes	1932	First sound adaptation of the stage play (American)
Lyn Harding	The Triumph of Sherlock Holmes	1935	1931–1937 film series (British)
Lyn Harding	Silver Blaze	1937	1931–1937 film series (British)
George Zucco	The Adventures of Sherlock Holmes	1939	1939–1946 film series (American)
Lionel Atwill	Sherlock Holmes and the Secret Weapon	1942	1939–1946 film series (American)
Henry Daniell	The Woman in Green	1945	1939–1946 film series (American)
Hans Söhnker	Sherlock Holmes and the Deadly Necklace	1962	West German-French-Italian film
Leo McKern	The Adventure of Sherlock Holmes' Smarter Brother	1975	American film
Laurence Olivier	The Seven-Per-Cent Solution	1976	American film
Anthony Higgins	Young Sherlock Holmes	1985	American film
Paul Freeman	Without a Clue	1988	American film
Kiyoshi Kobayashi	Case Closed: The Phantom of Baker Street	2002	Japanese anime film (Japanese version)
Richard Roxburgh	The League of Extraordinary Gentlemen	2003	American film
Jared Harris	Sherlock Holmes: A Game of Shadows	2011	British-American film
Ralph Fiennes	Holmes & Watson	2018	American film
Sharon Duncan-Brewster	Enola Holmes 2	2022	British-American film
Sharon Duncan-Brewster	Enola Holmes 3	2026	British-American film
Jared Stephens	Sherlock Holmes: Mare of the Night	2025	American film
Jared Stephens	Sherlock Holmes: The Fall of Watson	TBA	American film
Chuck Rafferty	Sherlock Holmes and the Angels of Vengeance	2025	American film
Ethan Vaughan	Moriarty Rising: A Sherlock Holmes Tale	TBA	Italian production

== Video games ==
Name	Title	Date	Type
Roger L. Jackson	The Lost Files of Sherlock Holmes: The Case of the Rose Tattoo	1996	Voice only; digitized sprites based on a different actor
George Gregg	The Lost Files of Sherlock Holmes: The Case of the Rose Tattoo	1996	Digitized-sprite actor
Unknown actor	The Testament of Sherlock Holmes	2012	Sherlock Holmes series; voice role
Unknown actor	Sherlock Holmes: The Devil's Daughter	2016	Sherlock Holmes series; voice role
Takaya Hashi	Fate/Grand Order (Limited event character)	2017	Mobile game; voice role (Japanese)

== See also ==
- Professor Moriarty in other media
- List of actors who have played Sherlock Holmes
- List of actors who have played Dr. Watson
- List of actors who have played Inspector Lestrade
- List of actors who have played Irene Adler
- List of actors who have played Mycroft Holmes
- List of actors who have played Mrs. Hudson
