= The Sign of Four (1932 film) =

1932 film

The Sign of Four: Sherlock Holmes' Greatest Case
- Directed by: Graham Cutts
- Screenplay by: W. P. Lipscomb
- Based on: The Sign of the Four by Arthur Conan Doyle
- Produced by: Basil Dean
- Starring: Arthur Wontner; Ian Hunter; Isla Bevan
- Cinematography: Robert De Grasse; Robert Martin
- Edited by: Otto Ludwig
- Music by: Ernest Irving
- Production company: Associated Talking Pictures
- Distributed by: RKO Pictures
- Release date: May 1932
- Running time: 75 minutes
- Country: United Kingdom
- Language: English

The Sign of Four (also known as The Sign of Four: Sherlock Holmes' Greatest Case.) is a 1932 British crime film directed by Graham Cutts and starring Arthur Wontner, Ian Hunter and Graham Soutten. It was written by W. P. Lipscomb based on Arthur Conan Doyle's second Sherlock Holmes novel The Sign of the Four (1890). It is the third film in the 1931–1937 film series starring Wontner as Sherlock Holmes, and is in the public domain.

A young woman needs Sherlock Holmes for protection when she is tormented by an escaped killer. However, when the woman is abducted, Holmes and Watson must infiltrate the city's criminal underworld to track down the young woman.

== Plot ==
Jonathan Small, a prisoner serving a lengthy sentence on the Andaman Islands cuts a deal with two army officers, Major Sholto and Captain Morstan, in command of the prison. He reveals the location of a stash of loot in exchange for their help in helping him to escape from jail. The proceeds are to be split equally between the three of them.

Sholto and Morstan go to investigate the treasure which is hidden in an old Indian fortress. When they unearth the valuable trinkets behind a brick wall it sparks a violent quarrel between the two men with each wanting to take all of the treasure. After a struggle Sholto kills his accomplice and returns to England without fulfilling his pledge to help Small escape.

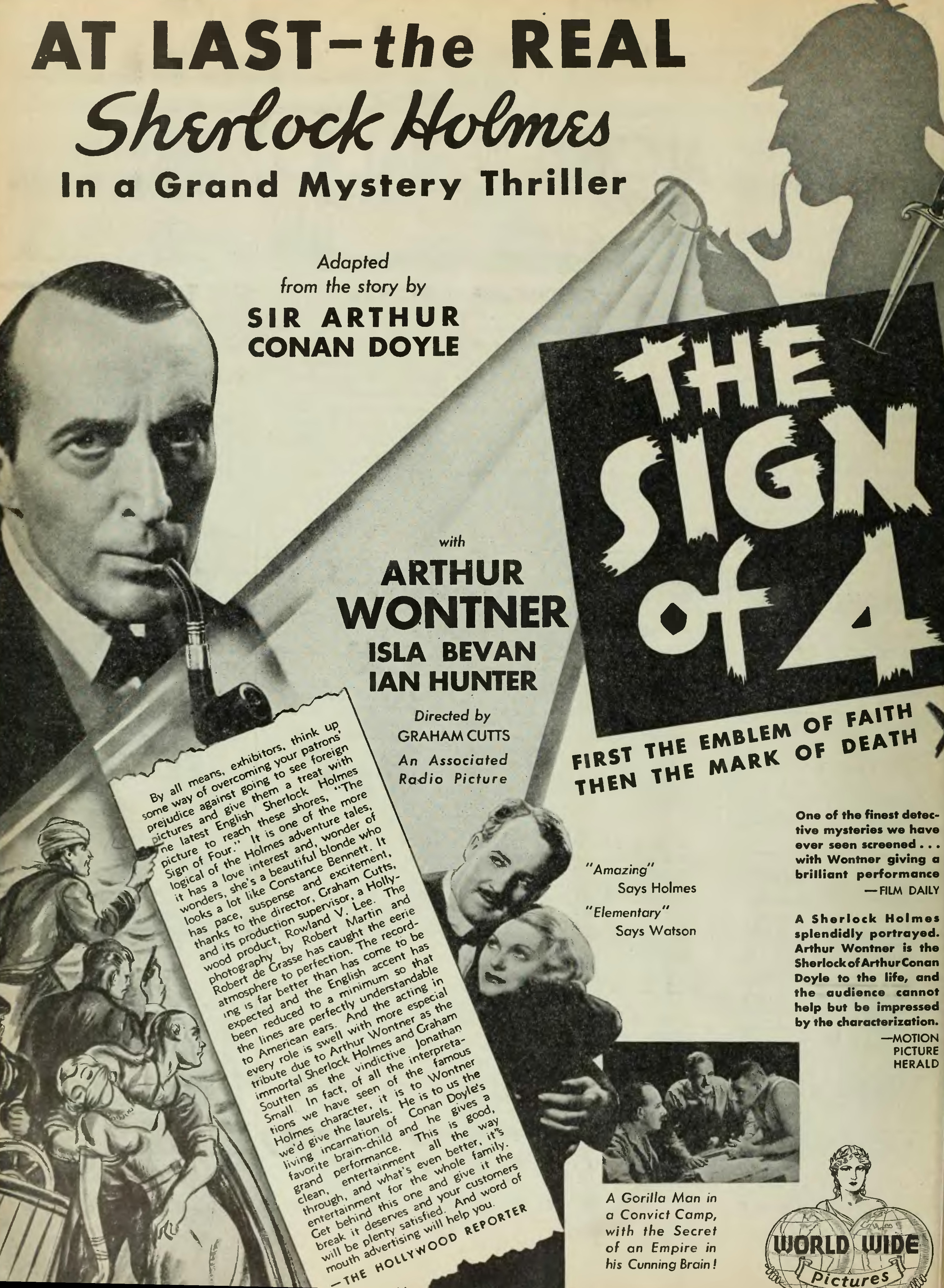
The Sign of 4 ad from The Film Daily, 1932

A number of years later Sholto is now living in London in great wealth thanks to his theft of the treasure. However, he is disturbed to read of the escape from jail of Small. He becomes haunted by the sound of Small's wooden leg and is convinced he will shortly be killed in revenge for his past betrayal of the convict. He calls his sons Bartholomew and Thaddeus to him and tells them of his murky past that had gained him the wealth on which the family fortune is built. He reveals that Morstan had a daughter, Mary, and instructs his sons to send her a valuable necklace and split their inheritance with her. Shortly afterwards Sholto is murdered before he can reveal the location of the bulk of his treasure.

The killing has been committed by Small who has broken out of jail with two accomplices, a heavily-tattooed convict and a native named Tonga. He reveals himself and menaces Thaddeus into telling him about Miss Morstan. The gang soon begin threatening Miss Morstan in the hope that she will hand over her share of the treasure to them. Frightened, she calls in Sherlock Holmes to help her protect herself. She is approached by Thaddeus, who reveals that the secret hiding place of the treasure has been discovered, and offers her the share as instructed by his father, and takes them to the family house.

However, when they arrive there Bartholomew is dead, and the treasure is missing. Holmes has his theory about the murder, but the innocent Thaddeus is arrested for murder by the incompent detective from Scotland Yard. Holmes and Watson set out to prove Theodore's innocence and track down the gang who are threatening Miss Morstan. They soon discover that Small and his accomplices are waiting to take the necklace from Mary Morstan to complete their haul and then flee the country and are hiding out in a circus. Watson unwisely takes Mary to investigate, and she is forcibly taken by them. Small's gang plan to make their escape by boat up the River Thames, but they are pursued by Holmes and Watson. The film climaxes in a shoot-out at a deserted warehouse.

== Cast ==
- Arthur Wontner as Sherlock Holmes
- Isla Bevan as Mary Morstan
- Ian Hunter as Dr. John H. Watson
- Graham Soutten as Jonathan Small
- Miles Malleson as Thaddeus Sholto
- Herbert Lomas as Major John Sholto
- Gilbert Davis as Det. Insp. Atherly Jones
- Margaret Yarde as Mrs. Smith
- Roy Emerton as the tattooed man
- Charles Farrell as funfair patron
- Clare Greet as Mrs Hudson
- Moore Marriott as Mordecai Smith
- Edgar Norfolk as Captain Morstan
- Kynaston Reeves as Bartholomew Sholto
- Ernest Sefton as Barrett
- Mr. Burnhett as tattoo artist
- Togo as Tonga

== Production ==
After the successes of The Sleeping Cardinal and The Missing Rembrandt, Wontner was lured away from Twickenham Studios to make a Sherlock Holmes film for Associated Radio Pictures. Graham Cutts was hired to direct with Rowland V. Lee as a production supervisor. To de-age the leads, Wontner was given a thick toupée and regular Watson Ian Fleming was replaced by the younger Ian Hunter.

Unlike other adaptations of Conan Doyle's story, screenwriter W.P. Lipscomb had the flashback scenes placed at the beginning making the film unfold chronologically. Lipscomb took some great liberties with the story and the characters having Holmes make some large leaps in logic such as deducing a letter's author having only one leg based on handwriting alone and deducing the source of a rope based on traces of malt. He also moves the address from the famed 221B Baker Street to 22A.

== Reception ==
Film Weekly wrote: "An excellent portrait of a sinister ex-convict by Ben [sic] Soutten is the most entertaining feature of this new adaptation of Conan Doyle's story. Soutten, a comparatively unknown payer, completely out-acts Arthur Wontner, although the latter repeats his polished and amusing interpretation of Sherlock Holmes. Unfortunately, the production generally is not on a par with the acting. The development of the complicated plot is often very obscure while some of the master detective's 'deductions' appear miraculous enough to make the audience gasp as well as Dr. Watson."

Kine Weekly wrote: "Straightforward but rather unimaginative picturisation of Conan Doyle's famous story. The development is inclined to be slow and heavy, and lack that subtlety which is essential before strong suspense can be built up. However, Arthur Wontner again distinguishes himselt as Sherlock Holmes, and it is his performance, coupled with good support, which makes the picture entertaining."

The Daily Film Renter wrote: "Tedious adaptation of Sherlock Holmes' classic, hardly likely to appeal to readers of Conan Doyle. Overplus of footage serves to prolong unconvincing narrative, while photography and sound are hardly up to the best standards. Development is obscure, and some of the master sleuth's 'deductions' seem too good to be true. Dialogue very stilted and acting undistinguished."
