= Colonel Moran =

- Sherlock Holmes character
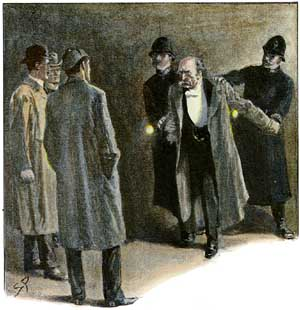
- Colonel Moran is arrested in "The Adventure of the Empty House", illustration by Sidney Paget
- First appearance: "The Adventure of the Empty House" (1903)
- Created by: Arthur Conan Doyle

In-universe information
- Full name: Sebastian Moran
- Gender: Male
- Title: Colonel
- Family: Sir Augustus Moran, CB (father)
- Nationality: British

Colonel Sebastian Moran is a fictional character in the stories written by Arthur Conan Doyle. An enemy of Sherlock Holmes, he first appears in the 1903 short story "The Adventure of the Empty House". Holmes once described him as "the second most dangerous man in London", the most dangerous being Professor Moriarty, Moran's employer. Many adaptations depict him as Moriarty's most trusted confidant, mirroring Holmes's own relationship with Dr. Watson.

== Fictional character biography ==
In "The Adventure of the Empty House", Sherlock Holmes looks up biographical information about Sebastian Moran in his index of criminal biographies. According to this, Moran was born in London in 1840, the son of Sir Augustus Moran, CB, sometime Minister to Persia.

He was educated at Eton College and the University of Oxford before embarking upon a military career. Formerly of the 1st Bangalore Pioneers (Madras), he served in the Jowaki Expedition of 1877–1878 and in the Second Anglo-Afghan War, seeing action at the Battle of Char Asiab, 6 October 1879 (for which he was mentioned in despatches); the Battle of Sherpur, 23 December 1879; and at Kabul.

A devoted sportsman and highly skilled shot, he was author of the books Heavy Game of the Western Himalayas in 1881 and Three Months in the Jungle in 1884, and reportedly once "crawled down a drain after a wounded man-eating tiger". Although there was no open scandal after his turning to crime, he was obliged to retire from the army and return to London. Outwardly respectable, with an address in Conduit Street, Mayfair, and membership of the (fictional) Anglo-Indian Club, the Tankerville Club and The Bagatelle Card Club, he was nevertheless recruited by Professor Moriarty, and served as his chief of staff. Ultimately he is used solely for assassinations that required his peculiar skill with the rifle; Holmes mentions the killing of a Mrs. Stuart in 1887 which he suspects (but cannot prove) Moran was involved in. In "The Final Problem" (set in 1891), Moran escaped incrimination, and followed the Professor to Reichenbach Falls, where Moran attempted to kill Holmes by rolling boulders upon him.

Thereafter Moran earned a living in London by playing cards at several clubs. When one of the other players, Ronald Adair, noticed that Moran won by cheating and threatened to expose him, Moran murdered Adair with a silenced air rifle that fired revolver bullets. Dr. Watson and the returned Holmes having taken the case, Moran attempted to kill Holmes by firing the air rifle from a vacant house opposite the detective's residence. Holmes having anticipated this, Moran shot a wax effigy of the detective, while Holmes, Watson, and Inspector Lestrade all hid nearby to seize the would-be assassin.

In "The Adventure of the Illustrious Client", Holmes mentions Moran as still alive (in September 1902). Moran is also mentioned in "His Last Bow" as an example of Holmes's many adversaries who have futilely sworn revenge against him.

Colonel Sebastian Moran was also the villain in Doyle's Sherlock Holmes play The Crown Diamond, written in the early 1900s but not performed until 1921. When this play was adapted as the short story "The Adventure of the Mazarin Stone", Moran was replaced by 'Count Negretto Sylvius'.

== Inspirations ==
Andrew Glazzard has suggested that in The Empty House, Conan Doyle may have alluded to the real royal baccarat scandal, in which Sir William Gordon-Cumming, 4th Baronet, an army officer and tiger hunter, had been accused of cheating at baccarat. He sued his accusers and the trial called the future Edward VII as a witness. At least some readers have suggested online (citation needed) that Australian folk hero and war-criminal Henry Harboard "The Breaker" Morant as an inspiration for Moriarty. Posters cite the similarity of the two names, the fact that both were military men and the possibility that Doyle's service in The Boer War may have left him with a grievance against Morant.

== Other appearances ==
=== Literature ===
- Moran appears in the Flashman Papers novella Flashman and the Tiger, and as a boy in the novel Flash for Freedom!, by George MacDonald Fraser. (Fraser gives him a birth-date of 1834, and the full name "John Sebastian 'Tiger Jack' Moran".) In Flashman and the Tiger, on the retreat from Isandlwhana to Rorke's Drift, Moran demonstrates amazing speed and unearthly accuracy with a Remington Model 1875 .44 revolver.
- In Sherlock Holmes's War of the Worlds, the Artilleryman from The War of the Worlds is said to be Moran's son.
- In Martin Powell's short story "Sherlock Holmes in the Lost World" (collected in Gaslight Grimoire) Moran attempts to rebuild Moriarty's criminal empire after the latter's death, but is killed by Professor Challenger.
- Moran is the antagonist in the novel A Soul of Steel (formerly published as Irene At Large) by Carole Nelson Douglas, the third in her Irene Adler series. He is presented as a spy and double agent who betrayed the British and goes by the code name 'Tiger' and pseudonym Captain Sylvester Morgan.
- Moran appears in several works by Kim Newman:
  - As a vampire in the alternate history horror novel Anno Dracula.
  - In the short story "The Man Who Got Off The Ghost Train", Richard Jeperson is dispatched to investigate a decades-old mystery in which Colonel Moran played a brief but memorable part.
  - In the book Moriarty: The Hound of the D'Urbervilles, a collection of related stories, Moran is deliberately portrayed as a foil to Watson, whose relationship and history with Moriarty parallels that of Watson's with Holmes, from their first meeting in "A Volume in Vermilion" to their final parting in "The Problem of the Final Adventure". Moran, nicknamed 'Basher', is portrayed as debauched, violent and as something of an adrenaline junkie but also as educated and not entirely without morals. As the title suggests, the stories feature guest appearances by many of Moriarty and Moran's fictional contemporaries. Around half the stories in the collection had previously been published separately: "A Shambles in Belgravia" in BBC Online's Sherlock Holmes anthology, "A Volume in Vermilion" in Sherlock Holmes' Mystery Magazine, "The Red Planet League" in Gaslight Grimoire, and "The Adventure of the Six Maledictions" in Gaslight Arcanum.
- Moran appears in two stories in the anthology Shadows Over Baker Street: "A Study in Emerald" by Neil Gaiman (reprinted in Gaiman's collection Fragile Things) and "Tiger! Tiger!" by Elizabeth Bear. In "A Study in Emerald", a reimagining of A Study in Scarlet set in an alternate Cthulhu Mythos-inspired world, Moran takes on the role of narrator usually given to Watson, as he takes up residence in Baker Street with a consulting detective – although from then on events turn out very differently.
- In David McDaniel's Man from U.N.C.L.E. novels, Moran is identified as having founded an organization known as THRUSH after Professor Moriarty's death at Reichenbach.
- Moran appears as a minor character in Alan Moore's comic book series The League of Extraordinary Gentlemen, Volume I, as an underling of Moriarty, where they are both agents of the British Secret Service, assigned to create a criminal empire through which the government can control the criminal underworld. After Moriarty is promoted to the Directorship of the Service, Moran maintains control of the underworld on his behalf.
- In T. S. Eliot's poem "Gus: The Theatre Cat" (which became one of the songs in Cats), it is said that Gus once played a man-eating Tiger pursued by an Indian Colonel down a drain.
- In John Gardner's novel The Return of Moriarty, Moran is stated to have taken temporary charge of Moriarty's organization while The Professor was away from London following the events at the Reichenbach Falls (which are explained as never having happened as Watson [and later Holmes] described them). The events leading up to and of "The Empty House" are told from Moran's point of view. Naturally, The Professor is not pleased to hear of Moran's actions and arrest, and has Moran poisoned while in police custody to prevent him from talking.
- He appears briefly in Michael Kurland's novel Death by Gaslight as an associate of Professor Moriarty, and in a much larger role in the later The Empress of India, where he enlists Moriarty's help in retrieving a golden statue.
- In Jamyang Norbu's novel The Mandala of Sherlock Holmes, Moran is portrayed as the inheritor of Moriarty's criminal empire, pursuing Sherlock Holmes across India.
- He appears in David Stuart Davies's The Veiled Detective, a novel based mainly around a retelling of part of A Study in Scarlet, in which Dr. Watson is planted in Holmes's life by Professor Moriarty in order to monitor and report back on him.
- In the anthology My Sherlock Holmes edited by Michael Kurland, a collection of stories told from the viewpoints of minor characters from canon, A Study in Orange by Peter Tremayne recounts how Moran partly outwitted Holmes on a case. Moran also appeared in Tremayne's The Affray at the Kildare Street Club in The Mammoth Book of New Sherlock Holmes Adventures where he was foiled in a petty theft by a young Holmes.
- He appears as a minor character in the steampunk novel Whitechapel Gods by S.M. Peters (as does the blind mechanic Von Herder, the manufacturer of Moran's air rifle).
- A female version of Moran appears in Liar-soft's 2008 visual novel Shikkoku no Sharnoth ~What a beautiful tomorrow~ as one of the principal characters.
- Moran appears in the Italian comic book Storie da Altrove/Stories from Elsewhere (a spin-off series of Martin Mystère). In 1910, he unsuccessfully attempts to kill Sherlock Holmes. In the end, he was killed by Sherlock's brother Sherrinford who was possessed by a demon from another dimension.
- Moran appears in the book The File on Colonel Moran – Volume One: The Lure of Moriarty by Vernon Mealor, published by The Clyvedon Press, the first part being a first person account by the colonel of his pursuit of Holmes and his arrest for the Adair murder, the other two stories being accounts of his early days with Moriarty, presented as stories related by a reporter who conducted interviews with him.
- Moran appears as the main villain in the 2012 Sherlockian pastiche “Charlie Marlow y la rata gigante de Sumatra” (Charlie Marlow and the Giant Rat of Sumatra), a novel by Spanish author Alberto López Aroca, set in Mist Island (an alternative name for Skull Island). This novel also features many other fictional characters from Arthur Conan Doyle works, as Fred Porlock and Parker (two Moriarty Gang Members), Joseph Conrad’s Charles Marlow, Rudyard Kipling’s Peachey Taliaferro Carnehan, and an ancestor of C.C. Beck’s Doctor Sivana (misspelled “Sivane” in the novel), among others.
- Moran appears in the 2014 novel Moriarty by Anthony Horowitz. He is only revealed to be Moran at the end of the book but has a few appearances throughout.
- In Sherlock Holmes and the Servants of Hell by Paul Kane, it is revealed that Moriarty was able to escape his demise by using an incantation to transfer himself into the realm of the Cenobites, where he is transformed into the 'Engineer' of the Cenobites, intending to mount a new assault on Earth, eventually recruiting Moran for this purpose. In a confrontation in Hell, it is revealed that he is responsible for the death of Mary Watson, Watson's wife, as he attempted to poison Watson during Holmes' three-year absence but Mary took the poison by accident. During the confrontation in Hell, Holmes is able to make a deal with the master Cenobites to transform himself into a Cenobite to oppose Moriarty's forces while Watson is aided by Mary's spirit, with Mary destroying the transformed Moran to avenge her own death before her husband and friend defeat Moriarty and return to Earth.
- In The Thinking Engine by James Lovegrove, set in 1895, Moran is revealed to have escaped prison, and Holmes and Watson realize that he is acting as an agent to an initially-unknown employer to advise certain criminals in the city on how to commit particularly elaborate crimes. They soon determine that he is working for Moriarty – who survived the confrontation at Reichenbach in a hideously crippled state – and Watson manages to capture Moran in a final chase after Moriarty's role is exposed, with Watson shooting Moran in the left arm and shooting off his right index finger in the subsequent stand-off.
- Donald Serrell Thomas's 2013 novel Death on a Pale Horse features Moran's elder brother Rawdon "Randy" Moran as its chief antagonist. Holmes's biographical report conflates the histories of the two Moran brothers, crediting them both with distinguished actions in the British Army in Afghanistan and India, co-authorship of the two memoirs on hunting, and shared service to Professor Moriarty. In his report to the British government on the elder Moran, dated shortly after the events of "The Adventure of the Empty House", Holmes also mentions that Sebastian was executed by hanging for Ronald Adair's murder.
- Moran also appears in the manga and anime Moriarty the Patriot.

=== Television ===
- Moran was played by Eric Maturin in the BBC television series Sherlock Holmes (1951), the first television series adaptation of Sherlock Holmes.
- Moran's younger brother Jasper appears in the novel Young Sherlock: The Mystery of the Manor House written by Gerald Frow, and its Granada television adaptation.
- Colonel Moran appears in two episodes of the 1983 television series The Baker Street Boys, played by Michael Godley.
- Moran appears in the Granada television adaptation of "The Adventure of the Empty House" opposite Jeremy Brett as Holmes, here played by Patrick Allen. In this Moran is shown in flashback attempting to shoot Holmes at the Reichenbach Falls, rather than rolling rocks upon him as in the original story.
  - A similar event occurs with Moran in the Soviet television version of "The Adventure of the Final Problem".
- In the CBS television series Elementary, which takes places in modern-day New York City, Holmes (Jonny Lee Miller) captures a serial killer with the alias "M.", who Holmes believes responsible for the murder of Holmes's lover Irene Adler. In captivity, "M." reveals his real name to be Sebastian Moran (Vinnie Jones), a former Royal Marine now employed as an assassin, providing Holmes with the first clue to the existence of "Moriarty". Moran admits to his other crimes, but convinces Holmes that he is innocent of Adler's murder, and, realizing that Moriarty set him up to be captured, willingly goes to prison in the hope that Holmes will track down Moriarty. Holmes is later tricked into showing Moran a coded message in prison, informing him that his sister will be killed next unless he kills himself. Moran slams his head against the mirror in his cell, and is last reported to be in critical condition.
- "The Empty Hearse", the first episode of series 3 of the BBC television series Sherlock, features Lord Moran, a member of the House of Lords, as a mole for North Korea. He is ordered to carry out the bombing of the Palace of Westminster, but his plan is ultimately stopped by Holmes. The actor who portrayed this version of the character is unknown.
- "A Study in Sherlock" (January 28, 2013), one of several episodes of the Canadian television period detective series Murdoch Mysteries to feature Arthur Conan Doyle, also features a character named Sebastian Moran who is implied to be Doyle's inspiration for the villain of "The Empty House".
- Moriarty the Patriot is a Japanese animated television series where Sebastian Moran is voiced by Satoshi Hino in Japanese and Christopher Wehkamp in English.
- In Lupin the 3rd Part 6, Moran shows up as an assassin working for "The Professor".
- Moran (played by Suzy Eddie Izzard) appears in "The Cobalt Fissure", the final episode (May 3, 2026) of the CBS television series Watson. Mentioned in previous episodes as a ruthless underling of Moriarty, he appears onscreen seeking to take control of the professor's criminal empire following his death at Dr. Watson's hands in the first season's finale. Moran kidnaps Holmes and forces him to solve problems for him. When Holmes falls badly ill and cognitively disoriented, Moran drops him off at UHOP, and shoots a random nurse to get Watson's attention. He threatens to kill Mary Morstan if the detective isn't cured quickly. Shinwell Johnson, whose loved ones were threatened (and possibly killed) by the colonel the previous season, tracks down Moran and has him arrested.

=== Film ===
- Moran appears in three films starring Arthur Wontner as Sherlock Holmes. In The Sleeping Cardinal (1931) he is played by Louis Goodrich. In The Triumph of Sherlock Holmes (1935) he appears very briefly played by Wilfrid Caithness. He then appears in a larger role as Moriarty's right-hand man in Silver Blaze (a.k.a. Murder at the Baskervilles) (1937), played by Arthur Goullet.
- Moran appears as a jewel thief and the main villain in the 1946 Basil Rathbone film Terror by Night, played by Alan Mowbray.
- In the film Without a Clue, Moran (portrayed by Tim Killick) appears as Moriarty's tall bodyguard and has a scar down one side of his face. His weapon of choice is a switchblade which he uses to stab and cut his victims, and he is also a highly skilled knife thrower.
- Moran, played by Paul Anderson, appears in the 2011 film Sherlock Holmes: A Game of Shadows. Moran was renowned as one of the best marksmen in the British army, but following a "dishonourable discharge" (a mistaken reference to the procedure for expelling enlisted soldiers, rather than officers) he became a mercenary in the employ of Professor Moriarty, on whose orders Moran undertakes several assassinations throughout the film. He remains at large after the end of the film.
- Moran appears in Moriarty Rising: A Sherlock Holmes Tale, played by Fjodor Olev.

=== Radio ===
- In the radio series The New Adventures of Sherlock Holmes, Colonel Moran was played by Rex Evans in "The Tankerville Club Scandal" (1946), and by Barry Thomson in "The Adventure of London Tower" (1948).
- Colonel Moran was played by Noel Johnson in a radio dramatisation of "The Empty House" which aired in 1961 on the BBC Light Programme. It was part of a series of Holmes adaptations starring Carleton Hobbs and Norman Shelley.
- Frederick Treves played Moran in the BBC Radio Sherlock Holmes adaptations of "The Final Problem" (1992) and "The Empty House" (1993).
- Steve Manning voiced Colonel Moran in the 2009 Imagination Theatre radio drama "The Return of Sherlock Holmes", adapted from the short stories "The Final Problem" and "The Empty House".
- John Banks voiced Moran in the Big Finish Productions audio dramas "The Final Problem" and "The Empty House", released in 2011, as well as in "The Master of Blackstone Grange". in 2018 and "The Fiends of New York City" in 2022, both set after his time in prison.
- Moran was played by Angus King in Sherlock Holmes: The Voice of Treason, an Audible Original audio drama released in 2020.
- Moran is a major character in the Audible scripted podcast Moriarty, voiced by Billy Boyd in series 1, and Ross McCall in series 2.
- Moran is a recurring antagonist in the podcast series Sherlock and Co., voiced by Paul Bullion. He appears in "The Stockbroker's Clerk", "The Six Napoleons", "The Three Garridebs" and "The Empty House" in an expanded version of his role from the original short stories.

=== Stage ===
- Lauderdale Maitland appeared as Colonel Sebastian Moran in the 1923 play The Return of Sherlock Holmes.
