= The Adventure of Charles Augustus Milverton =

- Short story by Arthur Conan Doyle
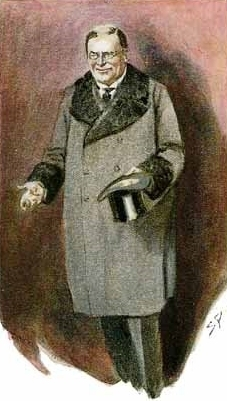
- Charles Augustus Milverton, 1904 illustration by Sidney Paget

Text available at Wikisource
- Country: United Kingdom
- Language: English
- Genre: Detective fiction short stories

Publication
- Published in: Strand Magazine
- Publication date: April 1904

Chronology
- Series: The Return of Sherlock Holmes
The Adventure of Black Peter	The Adventure of the Six Napoleons

"The Adventure of Charles Augustus Milverton" is one of the 56 Sherlock Holmes short stories written by Sir Arthur Conan Doyle. It was originally published in Collier's in the United States on 26 March 1904, and in The Strand Magazine in the United Kingdom in April 1904. It is one of 13 stories in the cycle collected as The Return of Sherlock Holmes (1905).

== Timeline ==
According to William S. Baring-Gould's timeline of the Sherlock Holmes canon, the events of "Milverton" occurred in 1899. Leslie S. Klinger also placed the story in 1899 in his timeline of the canon. This was nine years after the strange death of Charles Augustus Howell, the real-life inspiration for the character of Milverton (see below).

== Plot ==
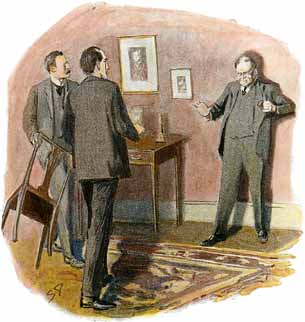
(l. to r.) Watson, Holmes and Charles Augustus Milverton, 1904 illustration by Sidney Paget

Holmes is hired by the débutante Lady Eva Blackwell to retrieve compromising letters from a blackmailer: Milverton, who causes Holmes more revulsion than any of the 50-odd murderers in his career. Milverton is "the king of blackmailers". He demands £7,000 (£763,572 in 2025) for the letters, which if given to third parties would cause a scandal that would end Lady Eva's marriage engagement. Holmes offers £2,000, all Lady Eva can pay, but Milverton insists on £7,000. It is worth £7,000 to him, he explains, to make an example of Lady Eva; it is in his long-term interest to ensure that his future blackmail victims would be more "open to reason" and pay him what he wants, knowing he will destroy them if they do not. Holmes resolves to recover the letters by whatever means necessary, as Milverton has placed himself outside the bounds of morality.

Holmes visits Milverton's Hampstead house, disguised as a plumber, in order to learn the plan of the house and Milverton's daily routine. He cultivates the acquaintance of Milverton's housemaid and even becomes engaged to marry her. This rather shocks Watson, but Holmes assures him that he has a hated rival who will step in when the plumber disappears. Holmes has learned where Milverton keeps his blackmail papers (a safe in his study), and plans to burgle Milverton's house that night. Watson comes along.

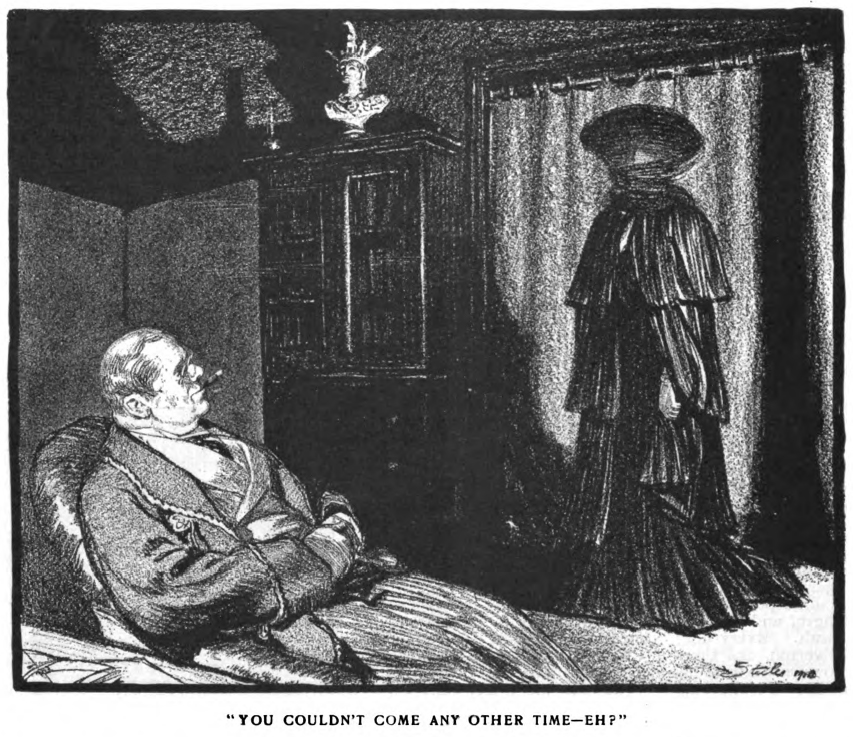
Milverton meets with the supposed maid, 1904 illustration by Frederic Dorr Steele in Collier's

They break into the study, but just as Holmes opens the safe, Milverton enters the study, even though he should be in bed asleep. Holmes and Watson hide behind a curtain, while Milverton has a midnight meeting with a supposed maidservant offering to sell letters that would compromise her mistress.

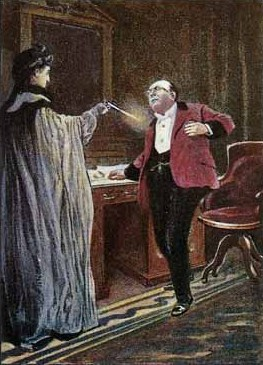
Milverton's death, 1904 illustration by Sidney Paget

The woman is actually one of Milverton's former victims, whose broken-hearted husband died when she wouldn't pay Milverton and he revealed her secret. Now she avenges her husband by shooting Milverton to death, then stamps on his face.

Watson instinctively begins to rush out and stop the shooting, but Holmes restrains him. Holmes understands, and Watson instantly realises, "that it was no affair of ours; that justice had overtaken a villain..." The woman runs away, and Milverton's household is roused by the shots. During his final confrontation, Milverton's entire cache of blackmail papers had been in a safe with its door slightly ajar. Holmes now feeds this mass of compromising material into Milverton's burning fireplace, despite the risk of being discovered and caught.

Then Holmes and Watson escape through the garden and over the wall. Watson has to kick himself free from a pursuer who has grabbed his leg.

The next morning, Inspector Lestrade calls at Baker Street to ask for Holmes' help in investigating Milverton's murder, which he ascribes to the two burglars seen escaping over the garden wall. He has a description of one of them: "a middle-aged, strongly built man-square jaw, thick neck, moustache..." Holmes calls the description vague, and even jokes that it could describe Watson, which amuses Lestrade. But Holmes refuses Lestrade's request, stating that he sympathizes with the criminals rather than the victim.

Later, Holmes recognises the face of the woman who killed Milverton. He shows Watson her photograph displayed in a shop-window among those of other celebrities. Watson recognises the name of her famous husband, but Holmes signals silence with a finger to his lips. Watson assures his readers that the killer in question is beyond the reach of the law [i.e. deceased] and that certain details have been disguised to hurt no one.

== Inspiration ==
The character of Charles Augustus Milverton was based on a real blackmailer, Charles Augustus Howell. He was an art dealer who preyed upon an unknown number of people, including the artist Dante Gabriel Rossetti. Doyle's literary inspiration often came from his natural interest in crime, and he had no tolerance for predators. Howell died in 1890 in circumstances as strange as any of Doyle's novels: His body was found near a Chelsea public house with his throat posthumously slit, with a coin (variously reported as a sovereign or half-sovereign) in his mouth. The presence of the coin was understood to be a criticism of those guilty of slander.

"The Adventure of Charles Augustus Milverton" was also inspired by the A. J. Raffles short story "Wilful Murder" by E. W. Hornung (Doyle's brother-in-law), according to Richard Lancelyn Green.

== Publication history ==
"The Adventure of Charles Augustus Milverton" was published in the US in Collier's on 26 March 1904, and in the UK in The Strand Magazine in April 1904. The story was published with six illustrations by Frederic Dorr Steele in Collier's, and with seven illustrations by Sidney Paget in the Strand. It was included in the short story collection The Return of Sherlock Holmes, which was published in the US in February 1905 and in the UK in March 1905.

== Adaptations ==
=== Film and television ===
The story was adapted as a short silent film titled Charles Augustus Milverton (1922) in the Stoll film series starring Eille Norwood as Sherlock Holmes.

The 1932 film The Missing Rembrandt, part of the 1931–1937 film series starring Arthur Wontner as Holmes, was loosely based on the story.

The story was faithfully adapted in the 1965 BBC series Sherlock Holmes with Douglas Wilmer as Holmes, and Barry Jones as Milverton. The only difference from the story is the identity of Milverton's killer.

The Soviet television film series The Adventures of Sherlock Holmes and Dr. Watson featured the case under the name "The King of Blackmail". It was the first of the three episodes concerning Professor Moriarty. Apparently, Milverton was a member of the gang, since certain papers were recovered from his office which helped implicate the Professor. The husband of the lady who kills Milverton is stated to be named Lord Christopher Huxley, aged 42, with Holmes reading an article about his death at the beginning of the episode. Holmes approaches the lady later to obtain the aforementioned papers which she took with her. Otherwise, it is faithful to the original.

The story was much extrapolated when adapted by screenwriter Jeremy Paul for Granada Television series Sherlock Holmes starring Jeremy Brett. It became the 1992 feature-length episode The Master Blackmailer and featured Robert Hardy as the eponymous reptilian Milverton. Holmes's relationship with the maid is expanded upon, allowing Brett to suggest Holmes' buried tenderness and inability, or unwillingness, to indulge in matters of the heart. Milverton's face is not shown until Watson meets him while viewing artwork at a gallery; prior to this, either Milverton is reading something, he is shown at a distance, or simply viewed from behind. The violence of the villain's end, including the grisly grinding of the avenger's heel into the dead Milverton's bespectacled face, is faithfully adapted, but Holmes and Watson do not at the end gaze upon Milverton's killer's portrait, as the murderess is identified. Deviating from the original story, Holmes holds a very different opinion about the case's end. He requests Watson not to chronicle the case, deeming it to have unpleasant circumstances, whereas in the original story Holmes is slightly more cheerful, as shown by his joking to Lestrade, which is omitted from this adaptation.

The "Dead Man's Switch" episode of the CBS crime drama Elementary loosely adapts the story, with Milverton as a professional blackmailer who contacts his "clients" and prevents his own exposure by informing them that he has an accomplice who will distribute the damaging material if Milverton is arrested. Milverton is brought to Holmes's attention when he blackmails the family of a rape victim, the family being known to Holmes's addiction sponsor. The case is complicated when Holmes witnesses Milverton's murder while infiltrating his house to retrieve the incriminating footage. Holmes is compelled to locate Milverton's accomplice, who has access to all of Milverton's material and instructions to post it on the Internet if Milverton is caught or killed.

The third season of the BBC adaptation Sherlock features 'Charles Augustus Magnussen', portrayed by Lars Mikkelsen, as a primary antagonist. The episode "His Last Vow" aired 12 January 2014. In it, it is revealed that Charles Magnussen keeps the information with which he blackmails his victims in his own mind palace (inside his head), only occasionally acquiring hard copies when he has to. Despite Mycroft's warning Sherlock to leave Magnussen alone as he is occasionally useful to the government, he is shot dead by Sherlock in order to free John from his power and guarantee Mary's safety, as Sherlock realises by using his mind palace he has no actual evidence in the event of his death.

The episode "The Adventure of the Portrait of a Teacher" in the NHK puppetry television series Sherlock Holmes is loosely based on the story. In it, a portrait of history teacher Charles Augustus Milverton that Beppo draws in class is taken away by himself. Milverton is said to be the severest with pupils in Beeton School and Beppo requests Holmes to take it back. Holmes and Watson steal into the teacher's room where they see a female pupil Agatha, who is tutored by Milverton privately because she is too nervous to attend class with other pupils. She tells them that he is kind and in fact they find Milverton, who goes back to his room for an shocking sight.

The episode "The Phantom of Whitechapel Act 2" of the Japanese animated series, Yuukoku no Moriarty (Moriarty the Patriot), introduces Charles Augustus Milverton as an antagonist. In the Phantom of Whitechapel story, a group of individuals murder prostitutes and blame the deeds on Jack the Ripper in hopes of starting a violent revolution to overthrow the government by sowing discord between Scotland Yard and a vigilante group of citizens. At the end of the story, the individuals are murdered by Moriarty, but it is revealed that Charles Augustus Milverton had secretly masterminded the plan. Milverton identifies Moriarty leaving the scene of the murders using a telescope and adds Moriarty's name to a mysterious list.

=== Radio and audio dramas ===
A radio adaptation titled "Charles Augustus Milverton" aired as an episode of the American radio series The Adventures of Sherlock Holmes. The episode, dramatised by Edith Meiser, aired on 18 May 1931, with Richard Gordon as Sherlock Holmes and Leigh Lovell as Dr. Watson.

Meiser also adapted the story for the American radio series The New Adventures of Sherlock Holmes, with Basil Rathbone as Holmes and Nigel Bruce as Watson. The episode, titled "The Adventure of Charles Augustus Milverton", aired on 4 December 1939.

The story was combined with A Study in Scarlet for a radio adaptation titled "Dr Watson Meets Mr Sherlock Holmes", which aired on the BBC Light Programme on 5 October 1954 as the first of a series of episodes featuring John Gielgud as Holmes and Ralph Richardson as Watson. The episode aired on NBC radio on 2 January 1955.

Another radio adaptation was made as part of a syndicated series, produced by Harry Alan Towers and starring John Gielgud as Holmes and Ralph Richardson as Watson.

Michael Hardwick adapted the story as a 1961 radio drama that aired on the BBC Light Programme, as part of the 1952–1969 radio series starring Carleton Hobbs as Holmes and Norman Shelley as Watson.

An audio drama based on the story was released in 1970 on LP record. Holmes was voiced by Robert Hardy (who later played Milverton in the 1992 television adaptation) and Watson was voiced by Nigel Stock (who also played Watson in the 1965 television adaptation). It was dramatised and produced by Michael Hardwick (who also adapted the 1961 radio adaptation) and Mollie Hardwick.

An adaptation of the story aired on BBC radio in 1978, starring Barry Foster as Holmes and David Buck as Watson.

"Charles Augustus Milverton" was dramatised for BBC Radio 4 in 1993 by Bert Coules as part of the 1989–1998 radio series starring Clive Merrison as Holmes and Michael Williams as Watson. It featured Peter Vaughan as Milverton.

The story was adapted as a 2008 episode of The Classic Adventures of Sherlock Holmes, a series on the American radio show Imagination Theatre, starring John Patrick Lowrie as Holmes and Lawrence Albert as Watson. Charles Augustus Milverton was played by the creator of Imagination Theatre, Jim French.

In 2025, the podcast Sherlock & Co. adapted the story in a three-episode adventure called "Charles Augustus Milverton", starring Harry Attwell as Sherlock Holmes, Paul Waggott as Dr. John Watson and Marta da Silva as Mariana "Mrs. Hudson" Ametxazurra.

=== Other media ===
The story, along with "The Disappearance of Lady Frances Carfax", "The Adventure of the Empty House", and "The Red-Headed League", provided the source material for the play The Return of Sherlock Holmes.

In Gerald Lientz's 1987 gamebook Death at Appledore Towers (Sherlock Holmes Solo Mysteries number 3) Watson's cousin, a protégé of Holmes, investigates Milverton's murder after Holmes has refused to do so.

In Donald Thomas's collection of short stories, The Secret Cases of Sherlock Holmes (1997), Watson "admits" that Milverton was, in fact, an alias used for the real Charles Augustus Howell. The story also serves as the basis for Thomas's short story in the collection of the same name, "The Execution of Sherlock Holmes", in which Milverton's brother Henry (and several other relatives of Holmes's past adversaries) kidnap Holmes and stage a kangaroo court, putting Holmes "on trial" for the murder of Milverton.

One of the antagonists of The Great Ace Attorney is Ashley Milverton, alias Graydon, who steals and tries to sell secrets held by the British government.

In Moriarty the Patriot, a manga retelling of the Sherlock Holmes story, Milverton is an enemy of both Holmes and Professor Moriarty. In this adaptation, in addition to being the "King of Blackmail" he also plays a role similar to Moriarty, organising various crimes for unseemly patrons. This includes orchestrating the Jack the Ripper killings and forcing a beloved MP to commit murder. Ultimately, his plan brings Holmes, Moriarty, and himself into a confrontation, believing that he can use Holmes to eliminate Moriarty. Holmes however shoots and kills Milverton, much to his surprise.
