= I Lived with You =

1933 film

I Lived With You
- Directed by: Maurice Elvey
- Written by: George A. Cooper; H. Fowler Mear
- Based on: I Lived With You by Ivor Novello
- Produced by: Julius Hagen
- Starring: Ivor Novello; Ursula Jeans; Ida Lupino; Jack Hawkins
- Cinematography: Sydney Blythe
- Edited by: Jack Harris
- Music by: W.L. Trytel
- Production company: Twickenham Studios
- Distributed by: Woolf & Freedman Film Service
- Release date: 14 June 1933
- Running time: 95 minutes
- Country: United Kingdom
- Language: English

I Lived With You is a 1933 British romantic comedy film directed by Maurice Elvey and starring Ivor Novello, Ursula Jeans and Ida Lupino. It is based on the West End hit play I Lived With You by Novello.

== Plot ==
Young Cockney shop girl Gladys Wallis meets penniless Russian Prince Felix Lenieff in the Hampton Court Maze and, learning he has no place to stay, takes him home to live with her family. His presence creates chaos in her family's humble Fulham home. At first the others do not believe he is a prince, but he has a locket that Nicholas II, the last tsar, gave to his now-deceased mother. Gladys's father works in the diamond trade and confirms that the jewels on it are valuable diamonds. Felix does not want to sell them for his own sake, but is persuaded by Mr. Wallis to let him do so, as it will benefit the family.

== Cast ==
- Ivor Novello as Prince Felix Lenieff
- Ursula Jeans as Gladys Wallis
- Ida Lupino as Ada Wallis
- Minnie Rayner as Mrs. Wallis
- Eliot Makeham as Mr. Wallis
- Cicely Oates as Flossie Williams
- Jack Hawkins as Mort [Gladys's boyfriend]
- Beryl Harrison as Miss Violet Bradshaw
- Douglas Beaumont as Albert Wallis [Gladys's brother]
- Molly Fisher as May Sawley (as Mollie Fisher)
- Victor Bogetti as Thornton [Ada's boyfriend]
- Davina Craig as Maggie
- Hannah Jones
- Agnes Imlay
- Maud Buchanan
- Gwen Floyd

== Critical reception ==
TV Guide wrote, "originally a play by Novello, who transplanted almost the entire cast for the filmed version, the main exception to the stage cast being Lupino, who gave a strong emotional performance." and the Radio Times wrote, "it's all directed with a teasingly respectable salaciousness by Maurice Elvey, but of much greater interest to most film fans will be the pre-fame performances of Jack Hawkins and Ida Lupino." and BBC Wales Arts wrote, "this is a riotously funny film and Novello not for the first or last time on screen, operates, tantalisingly, on different layers. He's always aware of his screen spectator in the dark, but don't be misled - this performance doesn't reek of the greasepaint in the least. It's just that Novello has the rare ability to maintain a playful, ironic stance which many critics, even today, seem incapable of appreciating or recognising."

== Bibliography ==
- Low, Rachael. Filmmaking in 1930s Britain. George Allen & Unwin, 1985.
- Wood, Linda. British Films, 1927-1939. British Film Institute, 1986.
