= The Valley of Fear =

1915 Sherlock Holmes novel by Arthur Conan Doyle

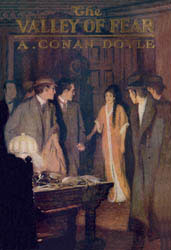
- First edition (US)
- Author: Arthur Conan Doyle
- Language: English
- Series: Sherlock Holmes
- Genre: Detective
- Publisher: George H. Doran Company
- Publication date: 1915
- Publication place: United States
- Preceded by: The Return of Sherlock Holmes
- Followed by: His Last Bow
- Text: The Valley of Fear at Wikisource

The Valley of Fear is the fourth and final Sherlock Holmes novel by British writer Arthur Conan Doyle. The backstory is loosely based on the Molly Maguires and Pinkerton agent James McParland. The story was first published in the Strand Magazine between September 1914 and May 1915. The first book edition was copyrighted in 1914, and it was first published by George H. Doran Company in New York on 27 February 1915, and illustrated by Arthur I. Keller.

== Plot ==
Sherlock Holmes receives a cipher message from Fred Porlock, a pseudonymous double agent of Professor Moriarty. Holmes deciphers the message as a warning of a nefarious plot against a man surnamed Douglas, a country gentleman residing at Birlstone House. Some minutes later, Inspector MacDonald arrives at 221B Baker Street with news that Douglas was murdered the night before. MacDonald, Holmes, and Dr. Watson travel to Birlstone House to investigate.

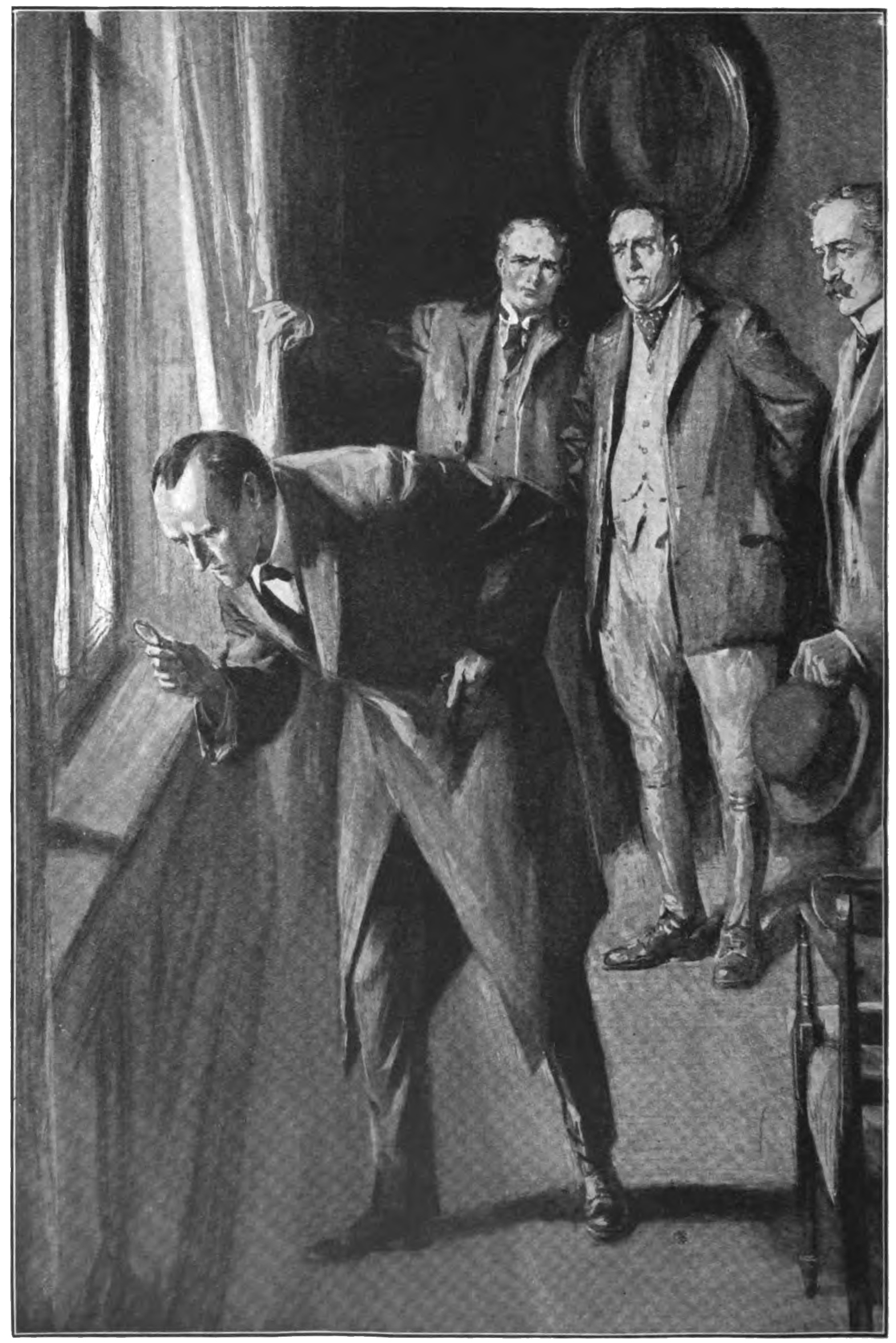
Holmes studies the window sill as MacDonald, White Mason, and Watson observe (Strand, 1914)

Birlstone House is surrounded by a shallow moat, which the murderer appears to have crossed as they fled the crime scene. After interviewing Cecil Barker, a frequent guest at Birlstone House who discovered the body, they agree that suicide is out of the question and that someone from outside the house committed the murder. Barker explains that Douglas married after arriving in England five years earlier. Barker believes a secret society of men pursued Douglas, and that he retreated to rural England out of fear for his life. Mrs. Douglas said her husband mentioned something called "The Valley of Fear". Holmes learns that the housekeeper heard a sound, as if of a door slamming, half an hour before the alarm; Holmes believes that this sound was the fatal shot.

Local detective White Mason and Inspector MacDonald track a bicycle found on the grounds of the house to an American staying at a guest house. The American appears to be the murderer, but there is no sign of him. Holmes asks MacDonald to write to Barker, telling him that the police intend to search the moat the next day. That night, they lie in wait outside Birlstone Manor and see Barker fish the clothes of the missing American out of the moat. Barker refuses to explain the situation. At that moment, Douglas appears, alive and well. He hands Watson a written account called "The Valley of Fear", which explains why he feared for his life.

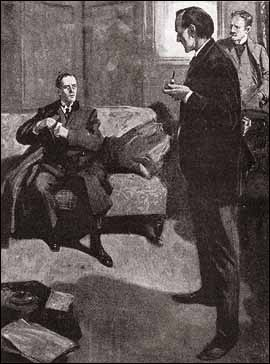
Barker informs Holmes about Douglas's fate (Strand, 1915)

Douglas explains that he had spotted an enemy of his, Ted Baldwin, in the area and expected an attack. When Baldwin attempted to shoot Douglas in his study, Douglas grabbed hold of Baldwin's shotgun; in the struggle, Baldwin was shot in the face. With Barker's help, Douglas dressed the man in his clothes to confuse his enemies. He then hid himself in the old priest hole at Birlstone.

The main narrative pauses to explain Douglas' past in America. Douglas' real name was Birdy Edwards and he had been a Pinkerton detective in Chicago. Working undercover for the Pinkertons, Edwards had travelled to Vermissa Valley (the titular Valley of Fear) under the name 'Jack McMurdo' to infiltrate a corrupt coal miners' masonic lodge, secretly a cover for a murderous gang of protection racketeers known as the Scowrers. After Edwards brought the gang to justice, the surviving criminals attempted to kill him. Edwards changed his name to Douglas and fled to England.

Holmes urges Douglas to leave England. Douglas takes this advice, but, shortly after, Holmes learns from Barker that Douglas was lost overboard on the ship to Africa. Holmes believes Moriarty was responsible for ending Douglas' life and he swears to bring Moriarty down.

== Publication history ==
The Valley of Fear was first serialised in The Strand Magazine from September 1914 to May 1915. In the Strand, it was published with thirty-one illustrations by Frank Wiles. In the United States, the novel was serialized from September to November 1914 in Associated Sunday Magazine supplements to various newspapers around the country.

The Valley of Fear was first published in book form by George H. Doran Company in New York on 27 February 1915, after the serialisation was completed in the United States but before it had finished in the Strand. The first British book edition was published by Smith, Elder & Co. on 3 June 1915. Like the first Holmes novel A Study in Scarlet, The Valley of Fear has two parts. The first part is titled "The Tragedy of Birlstone", and the second is titled "The Scowrers". The novel concludes with a short epilogue.

== Structure and themes ==
Doyle crafted The Valley of Fear as "two parts and a coda". The novel has a number of major themes, including "problems of ethical ambiguity", and attempts to comment seriously on terrorist activity as profiled by American union struggles. Critics have shown how the American union struggles deal with similar issues in the contemporary political situation in Ireland.

== Adaptations ==
=== Film ===
Several films have adapted the book, among them:

- The Valley of Fear (1916), a silent film starring H.A. Saintsbury and Booth Conway.
- The Triumph of Sherlock Holmes (1935), a British film starring Arthur Wontner as Holmes and Ian Fleming as Watson.
- Sherlock Holmes and the Deadly Necklace (1962), although intended to be an adaptation of The Valley of Fear, only minor elements of the story remained in the final film.
- Sherlock Holmes and the Valley of Fear (1983), an animated film starring Peter O'Toole as the voice of Holmes.

=== Television ===
- "The Case of the Pennsylvania Gun" (1954), an episode of the television series Sherlock Holmes (1954–1955) starring Ronald Howard as Holmes and Howard Marion-Crawford as Watson.
- "La valle della paura", episodes 1-2-3 of the Italian television series Sherlock Holmes (1968) starring Nando Gazzolo as Holmes and Gianni Bonagura as Watson.
- "The Crime Machine", an episode of the animated series Sherlock Holmes in the 22nd Century (1999–2001), with Jason Gray-Stanford voicing Holmes and John Payne voicing Watson. Despite the opening credits saying the episode is inspired by The Valley of Fear, there is actually no connection between the two.
- An episode of the puppetry television series Sherlock Holmes was loosely based on the story.
- "The Final Problem" (2017), the final episode of the 4th series of the BBC series Sherlock, makes a reference to Moriarty's brother being a station master, albeit switching the original role of railway station master for a broadcast station master.

=== Radio ===
The Valley of Fear was the only Sherlock Holmes story not adapted for the 1930s radio series The Adventures of Sherlock Holmes, and was not adapted for radio until 1960. Radio adaptations of the story include:

- A 1960 BBC Home Service adaptation, dramatised by Michael Hardwick as part of the 1952–1969 radio series, starring Carleton Hobbs and Norman Shelley, and featuring Garard Green as Inspector Mason.
- A 1986 BBC Radio 4 adaptation starring Tim Pigott-Smith as Holmes and Andrew Hilton as Watson, with James Aubrey as Douglas and Edward de Souza as White Mason. Roy Apps adapted the story.
- A 1997 BBC adaptation by Bert Coules as part of the 1989–1998 radio series, starring Clive Merrison as Holmes and Michael Williams as Watson, and featuring Iain Glen as John Douglas/McMurdo, and Ronald Pickup as the narrator.
- A 2015 radio adaptation by M. J. Elliott in the American series The Classic Adventures of Sherlock Holmes, starring John Patrick Lowrie and Lawrence Albert, with Jeff Steitzer as Cecil Barker.

=== Stage ===
- The Valley of Fear, a 2004 popular stage adaptation by Adrian Flynn for the Oxford Playscripts series, for amateur productions.
- The Valley of Fear, a 2022 stage adaptation by the Blackeyed Theatre Company.
