= Minnie Rayner =

British stage and film actress (1869–1941)

- Born: 2 May 1869; London, United Kingdom
- Died: 13 December 1941 (aged 72); London, United Kingdom
- Occupation: Actor
- Years active: 1903–1940

Minnie Rayner (2 May 1869 – 13 December 1941) was a British stage and film actress.

In 1889, while in Cape Colony, she acted in the comic opera Falka as Edwige, the fiery Gipsey girl and sister of the brigand chief. The play was staged at the Globe Theatre in Johannesburg and was produced by Mr. Perkins of The Edgar Perkins Lyric Opera Company.

A character actress, she played working-class figures, often mothers, in films of the 1930s. Her roles include the matriarch of the working-class Fulham family who takes in an exiled Russian prince (Ivor Novello) as a lodger in the comedy I Lived with You (1933). The same year she played Gracie Fields's mother in This Week of Grace.

A recurring role for Rayner was that of the landlady Mrs. Hudson in a series of Sherlock Holmes adaptations starring Arthur Wontner.

Rayner's stage work included the part of Clara in the original production of Noël Coward's Hay Fever at the Ambassadors Theatre, London, in 1925. She also appeared in a series of Ivor Novello's plays and musicals in the West End: Symphony in Two Flats (1929), Fresh Fields (1933), Glamorous Night (1935), Careless Rapture (1936), Crest of the Wave (1937), and The Dancing Years (1939). In 1930, she reprised her performance as Mabel in Symphony in Two Flats in the Broadway stage and British film versions.

== Filmography ==
- The Pickwick Papers (1913)
- My Old Dutch (1915)
- Lost and Won (1915)
- Sunken Rocks (1919)
- The Auction Mart (1920)
- Mary Latimer, Nun (1920)
- The Old Curiosity Shop (1921)
- If Youth But Knew (1926)
- The Ring (1927)
- Symphony in Two Flats (1930)
- The Sleeping Cardinal (1931)
- These Charming People (1931)
- The Man at Six (1931)
- Stranglehold (1931)
- Hobson's Choice (1931)
- The Missing Rembrandt (1932)
- The Veteran of Waterloo (1933)
- I Lived with You (1933)
- Excess Baggage (1933)
- This Week of Grace (1933)
- Dora (1933 short)
- Murder at the Inn (1934)
- Song at Eventide (1934)
- Flood Tide (1934)
- Sometimes Good (1934)
- It Happened in Paris (1935)
- Barnacle Bill (1935)
- The Triumph of Sherlock Holmes (1935)
- The Small Man (1936)
- A Woman Alone (1936)
- The House of the Spaniard (1936)
- If I Were Rich (1936)
- Dreams Come True (1936)
- Silver Blaze (1937)
- Gaslight (1940) as Elizabeth, the Cook
- Old Mother Riley in Society (1940)
