= Arthur Goullet =

British actor (1894–1978)

- Born: 19 April 1894; London, United Kingdom
- Died: 1978 (aged 83–84); London, United Kingdom
- Occupation: Actor
- Years active: 1930–1963 (film & TV)

Arthur Goullet (1894–1978) was a British stage, film and television actor. He played the role of Sebastian Moran in the 1937 Sherlock Holmes film Silver Blaze.

== Selected filmography ==
- Down River (1931)
- A Gentleman of Paris (1931)
- Red Wagon (1933)
- It's a King (1933)
- The Crimson Candle (1934)
- Colonel Blood (1934)
- King Solomon's Mines (1937) as Sylvestra Getto
- Silver Blaze (1937)
- Wanted! (1937)
- Hey! Hey! USA (1938)
- Strange Boarders (1938)
- For Freedom (1940)
- Caravan (1946)
- Epitaph for a Spy (1953) TV series
- The Singer Not the Song (1961)

== Bibliography ==
- Scott Allen Nollen. Sir Arthur Conan Doyle at the Cinema. McFarland, 1996.
