= Jack Harris (film editor) =

British film editor

- Born: 2 July 1905; Farnborough, Hampshire, England
- Died: 1971 (aged 65–66); Yeovil, Somerset, England
- Occupation: Film editor
- Years active: 1930–1971

Jack Harris (2 July 1905 – 1971) was a British film editor, born at South Farnborough, in the English county of Hampshire. Along with David Lean, he was one of the leading British editors from the 1930s to the 1950s. He edited half a dozen films directed by Lean in the 1940s.

== Selected filmography ==
- Roses of Picardy (1927)
- Mademoiselle Parley Voo (1928)
- Lord Richard in the Pantry (1930)
- The Sleeping Cardinal (1931)
- Chin Chin Chinaman (1931)
- A Night in Montmartre (1931)
- Splinters in the Navy (1931)
- Frail Women (1932)
- Condemned to Death (1932)
- The Missing Rembrandt (1932)
- The Lodger (1932)
- I Lived with You (1933)
- The Shadow (1933)
- The Wandering Jew (1933)
- Lily of Killarney (1934)
- Bella Donna (1934)
- Squibs (1935)
- Spy of Napoleon (1936)
- The Face at the Window (1939)
- The Chinese Bungalow (1940)
- Old Mother Riley's Circus (1941)
- Let the People Sing (1942)
- Theatre Royal (1943)
- Brief Encounter (1945)
- Great Expectations (1946)
- Oliver Twist (1948)
- Captain Horatio Hornblower R.N. (1951)
- The Prince and the Showgirl (1957)
