= Wilfrid Caithness =

British actor (1883–1954)

- Caithness in The Triumph of Sherlock Holmes (1935)
- Born: 21 July 1883; Paddington, London, England, UK
- Died: 19 September 1954 (aged 71); Taunton, Somerset, England, UK
- Other name: Wilfred Caithness
- Occupation: Actor
- Years active: 1911–1956 (film)

Wilfrid Caithness or Wilfred Caithness (1883–1954) was a British stage and film actor. He played the role of Sebastian Moran in the 1935 film The Triumph of Sherlock Holmes.

== Selected filmography ==
- A Voice Said Goodnight (1932)
- The Lad (1935)
- The Triumph of Sherlock Holmes (1935)
- D'Ye Ken John Peel? (1935)
- Checkmate (1935)
- Spy of Napoleon (1936)
- The Man Behind the Mask (1936)
- The Improper Duchess (1936)
- Perfect Crime (1937)
- Two for Danger (1940)
- My Sister and I (1948)
- Nothing Venture (1948)
- Brandy for the Parson (1952)

== Bibliography ==
- Reid, John. HOLLYWOOD 'B' MOVIES: A Treasury of Spills, Chills & Thrills.
