= Ian Fleming (actor) =

Australian character actor (1888–1969)

- in the trailer for Silver Blaze (1937)
- Born: Ian Macfarlane; 10 September 1888; Melbourne, Victoria, Australia
- Died: 1 January 1969 (aged 80); London, England
- Years active: 1926–1968

Ian Fleming (born Ian Macfarlane; 10 September 1888 – 1 January 1969) was an Australian character actor with credits in over 100 British films. One of his best known roles was playing Dr Watson in a series of Sherlock Holmes films of the 1930s opposite Arthur Wontner's Holmes.

Fleming also played a number of supporting roles in many classic British films of the era, including Q Planes (1939), Night Train to Munich (1940), We Dive at Dawn, The Life and Death of Colonel Blimp (both 1943) and Waterloo Road (1945). He also appeared regularly in the films of musical comedian George Formby. He also acted on stage, appearing as Robert Harley in Norman Ginsbury's historical work Viceroy Sarah in the West End.

Fleming's later career included appearances in many television series of the 1950s and 1960s, such as Fabian of the Yard, Hancock's Half Hour, Educated Evans, Dixon of Dock Green, Dr. Finlay's Casebook, The Forsyte Saga and The Prisoner.

== Partial filmography ==
=== Film ===
- Second to None (1927) as Brian Douglas
- The Ware Case (1928) as Michael Adye
- The Devil's Maze (1929) as Derek Riffington
- The School for Scandal (1930) as Joseph Surface
- The Sleeping Cardinal (1931) as Dr. Watson
- The Missing Rembrandt (1932) as Dr. Watson
- Lucky Girl (1932) as Lord Henry
- Called Back (1933) as Dr Carter
- After Dark (1933) as Henry Lea
- The Third Clue (1934) as Mark Clayton
- School for Stars (1935) as Sir Geoffrey Hilliard
- The Triumph of Sherlock Holmes (1935) as Dr. Watson
- Sexton Blake and the Mademoiselle (1935) as Henry Norman
- The Riverside Murder (1935) as Henry Sanders
- The Crouching Beast (1935) as Major Abbott
- Prison Breaker (1936) as Stephen Shand
- Excuse My Glove (1936) as Boxing Match Commentator
- Jump for Glory (1937) as Coroner
- Racing Romance (1937) as Martin Royce
- Darby and Joan (1937) as Sir Ralph Ferris
- Silver Blaze (1937), ( (akaMurder at the Baskervilles) as Dr. Watson
- Dial 999 (1938) as Sir Edward Rigg
- Quiet Please (1938) as Dr Craven
- If I Were Boss (1938) as Mr Biltmore
- Double or Quits (1938) as Sir Frederick Beal
- The Nursemaid Who Disappeared (1939) as Sir Egbert Lucas
- The Good Old Days (1939) (lost) as Lord Wakely
- The Lion Has Wings (1939)
- Men Without Honour (1939) as Frank Hardy
- Q Planes (1939) as Air Minister
- Three Silent Men (1940) as Pennington
- It Happened to One Man (1940)
- Night Train to Munich (1940)
- Jeannie (1941)
- They Flew Alone (1942) as Secretary
- Let the People Sing (1942) as United Plastics Barrister
- We Dive at Dawn (1943)
- The Life and Death of Colonel Blimp (1943)
- Waterloo Road (1945)
- I Didn't Do It (1945) as Chief Inslector Twyning
- They Knew Mr. Knight (1946) as Higgs
- George in Civvy Street (1946) as Uncle Shad
- Appointment with Crime (1946) as Prisoner Governor
- Quartet (1948) as Ralph
- A Matter of Murder (1949) as Det Sgt McKelvin
- Hammer the Toff (1952) as Doctor Lancaster
- Wings of Danger (1952) as Talbot
- The Voice of Merrill (1952) as Dr Forrest
- Black Orchid (1953) as Coroner
- Park Plaza 605 (1953) as Colonel Santling
- Eight O'Clock Walk (1954) as Jury Member
- The Embezzler (1954) as Doctor (uncredited)
- High Flight (1957) as Bishop
- Innocent Meeting (1958) as Garside
- Your Money or Your Wife (1960) as The Judge
- Bluebeard's Ten Honeymoons (1960) as Lawyer
- Return of a Stranger (1961) as Meecham
- The Lamp in Assassin Mews (1962) as Albert Potts
- Richard the Lionheart (1962) as Lord Chancellor
- River Rivals (1967)

=== Television ===
- Fabian of the Yard
- Hancock's Half Hour
- Dixon of Dock Green
- Educated Evans
- Dr. Finlay's Casebook
- The Forsyte Saga (TV serial, 1967) as Lord Fontenoy
- The Prisoner (1967)

== Selected stage appearances ==
- The Berg by Ernest Raymond (1929)
- Viceroy Sarah by Norman Ginsbury (1935) as Robert Harley in the West End
- The Blue Goose by Peter Blackmore (1941)
- His Excellency by Campbell Christie (1950)
