= Charles Mortimer =

British actor (1885–1964)

Charles Mortimer (1885–1964) was a British actor. Son of Charles Neil Mortimer - actor. Husband of Greta Wood - actress.

== Filmography ==
- Watch Beverly (1932) (film debut)
- You Made Me Love You (1933)
- Sometimes Good (1934)
- The Return of Bulldog Drummond (1934)
- Evergreen (1934)
- The Triumph of Sherlock Holmes (1935)
- Royal Cavalcade (1935)
- The Mystery of the Mary Celeste (1935)
- Things Are Looking Up (1935)
- The Price of a Song (1935)
- The Small Man (1936)
- Birds of a Feather (1936)
- Living Dangerously (1936)
- Someone at the Door (1936)
- Aren't Men Beasts! (1937)
- Dead Men Are Dangerous (1939)
- Poison Pen (1939)
- The Ghost of St. Michael's (1941)
- Theatre Royal (1943)
- The Life and Death of Colonel Blimp (1943)
- Dial 999 (1955)
- The Counterfeit Plan (1957) (final film)
