= The Triumph of Sherlock Holmes =

1935 British mystery film

- Theatrical release poster
- Directed by: Leslie S. Hiscott
- Written by: H. Fowler Mear; Cyril Twyford
- Based on: Valley of Fear by Arthur Conan Doyle
- Produced by: Julius Hagen (producer)
- Starring: Arthur Wontner; Lyn Harding; Leslie Perrins
- Cinematography: William Luff
- Edited by: Jack Harris; Ralph Kemplen
- Music by: W.L. Trytel
- Distributed by: Olympic Pictures
- Release date: 1935
- Running time: 84 minutes
- Country: United Kingdom
- Language: English

The Triumph of Sherlock Holmes (also known as Valley of Fear) is a 1935 British mystery film directed by Leslie S. Hiscott and starring Arthur Wontner. It was written by H. Fowler Mear and Cyril Twyford based on the 1915 Sherlock Holmes novel The Valley of Fear by Arthur Conan Doyle.

It was a Flamingo Films production and the fourth in the 1931–1937 film series starring Wontner as Sherlock Holmes. It is in the public domain.

== Plot ==
Sherlock Holmes and Dr. Watson come out of retirement to investigate a mysterious murder. They find that an American criminal organisation called The Scowrers has asked evil mastermind Professor Moriarty to wreak vengeance on John Douglas, the informant who sent them to prison. Holmes outsmarts Moriarty, solves the murder and brings Moriarty to justice.

== Cast ==
- Arthur Wontner as Sherlock Holmes
- Lyn Harding as Professor Moriarty
- Leslie Perrins as John Douglas
- Jane Carr as Ettie Douglas
- Ian Fleming as Dr. Watson
- Charles Mortimer as Inspector Lestrade
- Minnie Rayner as Mrs. Hudson
- Michael Shepley as Cecil Barker
- Ben Welden as Ted Balding
- Roy Emerton as Boss McGinty
- Conway Dixon as Ames
- Wilfrid Caithness as Col. Sebastian Moran
- Edmund D'Alby as Capt. Marvin
- Ernest Lynds as Jacob Shafter

== Critical reception ==
The Monthly Film Bulletin wrote: "Arthur Wontner is the only Sherlock Holmes. His playing throughout is in perfect character and he seems to have walked straight out of the Sidney Paget illustrations which made Sherlock Holmes universally recognisable. It is, therefore, disappointing that Dr. Watson should have been transformed from the bushy-moustached Victorian practitioner into a dapper contemporary. It is true Ian Fleming is successful in getting his laughs, but many would prefer him to have carried on the classical tradition. Lyn Harding, in an impossible part, came very near to presenting a credible 'Napoleon of crime.' Roy Emerton's Boss McGinty is a perfect piece of character acting. For the rest, the film moves – the brisk American sequence is particularly effective – the photography is good, but the triumph is Arthur Wontner's."

The Daily Film Renter wrote: "Arthur Wontner's realistic characterisation dominates picture, in which criminologist's personality constitutes outstanding avpeal. Workmanlike development. Touches of human comedy enliven unravelling of problem, and chase climax makes exciting conclusion. Straightforward detective feature in Sir Conan Doyle style."

Picturegoer wrote: "Arthur Wontner is a perfect Sherlock Holmes, and it is good to see him again as the world's most famous fictional detective. Unfortunately, the story is not too well told; there are very few really convincing scenes of crime detection and much too much footage is expended in showing the early life in America of the supposed victim of a murder mystery."

The New York Times wrote, "a mellow, evenly paced British film that renders to Holmes what Sir Arthur Conan Doyle would have rendered to him: Interest, respect and affection... Mr. Wontner decorates a calabash pipe with commendable skill, contributing a splendid portrait of fiction's first detective. Lyn Harding is capital as Moriarty and Roy Emerton, Leslie Perrins, Ian Fleming and Michael Shepley perform competently."
