= The Adventure of the Empty House =

Short story by Arthur Conan Doyle

- Short story by Arthur Conan Doyle
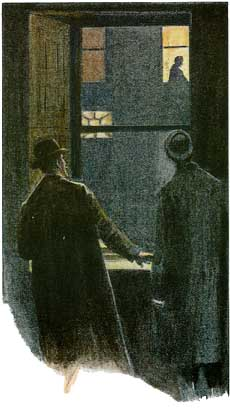
- Holmes and Watson gaze at a distant bust of Holmes' head, 1903 illustration by Sidney Paget

Text available at Wikisource
- Country: United Kingdom
- Language: English
- Genre: Detective fiction short stories

Publication
- Published in: Strand Magazine
- Publication date: October 1903

Chronology
- Series: The Return of Sherlock Holmes
The Hound of the Baskervilles	The Adventure of the Norwood Builder

"The Adventure of the Empty House", one of the 56 Sherlock Holmes short stories written by Sir Arthur Conan Doyle, is one of 13 stories in the cycle collected as The Return of Sherlock Holmes. It was first published in Collier's in the United States on 26 September 1903, and in The Strand Magazine in the United Kingdom in October 1903.

Public pressure compelled Doyle to bring the sleuth back to life, and explain his survival after his deadly struggle with Professor Moriarty at the Reichenbach Falls in "The Final Problem". Doyle had already published, in 1901–1902, The Hound of the Baskervilles, set before Holmes and Moriarty's battle. "The Empty House" is the first Holmes story set after his supposed death.

== Plot ==
On the night of 30 March, an apparently unsolvable locked-room murder takes place in London: the killing of the Honourable Ronald Adair.

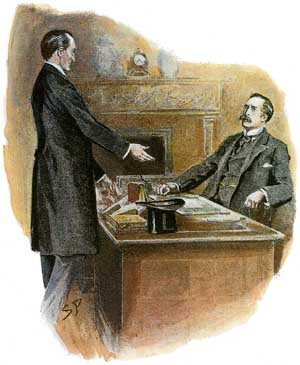
Holmes reunites with Watson. Art by Sidney Paget.

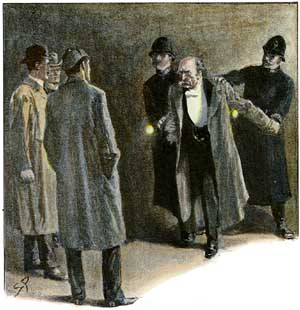
Sebastian Moran is arrested. Art by Sidney Paget.

Dr. Watson visits the murder scene. He runs into an elderly deformed book collector, later revealed as Sherlock Holmes in disguise, to his astonishment. Contrary to what Watson believed, Holmes survived his encounter with Professor Moriarty at Reichenbach Falls, faked his fall and spent the next few years travelling to various parts of the world, dismantling the remnants of Moriarty's gang.

That evening, they enter an abandoned building known as Camden House whose front room overlooks Baker Street. Holmes's room can be seen across the street. In the window is a lifelike waxwork bust of Holmes in profile. At approximately midnight, a sniper, who has taken the bait, fires a specialised air gun, scoring a direct hit on Holmes's dummy. Inspector Lestrade arrests the gunman, who is revealed as Colonel Sebastian Moran, Adair's whist partner and murderer. Holmes describes Moran as having been "the second most dangerous man in London" while Moriarty was still alive.

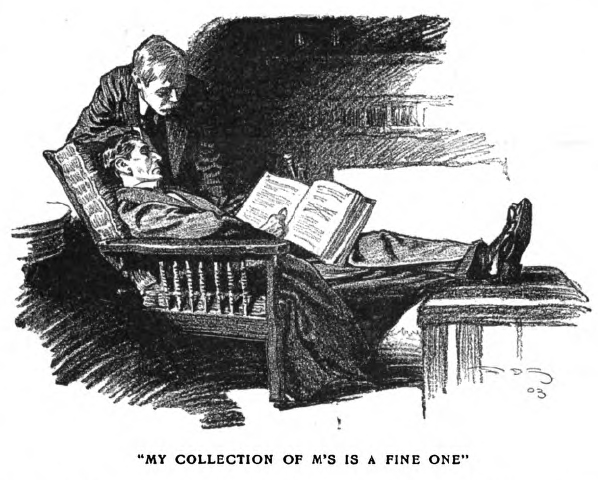
1903 illustration by Frederic Dorr Steele in Collier's

Holmes speculates that Adair had caught Moran cheating at cards, and threatened to expose his dishonourable behaviour. Moran, who earned a living playing cards crookedly, got rid of the one man who could rob him of his livelihood.

== Publication history ==
"The Adventure of the Empty House" was published in the US in Collier's on 26 September 1903, and in the UK in The Strand Magazine in October 1903. The story was published with seven illustrations by Frederic Dorr Steele in Collier's, and with seven illustrations by Sidney Paget in the Strand. It was included in the short story collection The Return of Sherlock Holmes, which was published in the US in February 1905 and in the UK in March 1905.

== Inspirations ==
Andrew Glazzard has suggested that the author may have been hinting his audience of the royal baccarat scandal in which Sir William Gordon-Cumming, 4th Baronet, an army officer and tiger hunter, had been accused of cheating at baccarat. He sued his accusers - the ensuing trial notably saw Prince Edward (later King Edward VII) take the stand as a witness. Glazzard also suggests that the oblique references that Holmes makes about his "missing years" are hints to the explorations of Sven Hedin in Tibet and Francis Younghusband's expedition to that country, and also to pro-British espionage in Mahdist Sudan.

== Adaptations ==
=== Film and television ===
This story was adapted as a short film released in 1921 as part of the Stoll film series starring Eille Norwood as Holmes.

The 1931 film The Sleeping Cardinal (also known as Sherlock Holmes' Fatal Hour) is loosely based on "The Adventure of the Empty House" and "The Final Problem".

Many elements of "The Adventure of the Empty House" were used in the 1939–1946 Sherlock Holmes film series starring Basil Rathbone and Nigel Bruce. In Sherlock Holmes and the Secret Weapon (1943), Holmes disguises himself as a German bookseller. The Spider Woman (1944) features Holmes faking his death at a waterfall, only to return to Watson while disguised. The Woman in Green (1945) uses the scene in which a sniper attempts to shoot Holmes from across the street and shoots a bust instead (instead of a wax sculpture of Holmes, the shooter fires at a bust of Julius Caesar, with whom Holmes shares a striking resemblance in profile), and is apprehended by Holmes and Watson who lie in wait. Colonel Sebastian Moran appears as the villain in Terror by Night (1946) as the last of Moriarty's gang. Though these films are included in a series, they share virtually no continuity.

The story was adapted as the first episode of the 1951 BBC TV series of We Present Alan Wheatley as Mr Sherlock Holmes in... starring Alan Wheatley as Holmes, Raymond Francis as Dr. Watson and Bill Owen as Inspector Lestrade. All six episodes of this series were broadcast live and are now lost.

The story was adapted in 1980 as an episode of the Soviet TV series The Adventures of Sherlock Holmes and Dr. Watson starring Vasily Livanov. The episode has some minor departures: Moran tries to shoot Holmes during his fight with Moriarty (he actually appears in the story before Moriarty, and both Holmes and Watson are aware of his motive to kill Adair from early on), with Holmes pretending to be hit to fake his death, Adair is still alive at the start of the episode, Watson unsuccessfully tries to protect him as instructed by Holmes, and Watson briefly becomes a prime suspect in Adair's murder.

The story was later adapted in 1986 as an episode of The Return of Sherlock Holmes starring Jeremy Brett. The episode is rather faithful to Doyle's story, except that Moran tries to shoot Holmes in Switzerland instead of dropping boulders on him, and it is Watson – not Holmes – that deduces the reason that Moran had for killing Ronald Adair. It was the first episode to feature Edward Hardwicke as Dr Watson, replacing David Burke who had played the role in the preceding episodes (Hardwicke reenacted a scene from "The Final Problem" in a flashback, consisting of Watson at the waterfall shouting to Holmes and reading his letter, which had been performed by Burke).

"The Adventure of the Empty House" was adapted as an episode of the animated television series Sherlock Holmes in the 22nd Century. The episode, also titled "The Adventure of the Empty House", first aired in 1999.

In "The Empty Hearse", the first episode of the third series of Sherlock starring Benedict Cumberbatch which aired on 1 January 2014, Holmes returns to London two years (instead of three) after faking his death. Instead of fainting with surprise that Sherlock is alive, Watson reacts furious and beats Sherlock several times, due to him not contacting him in the last two years. He reluctantly teams up with Sherlock to investigate an underground terrorist network.

=== Audio ===
Edith Meiser adapted the story as an episode of the American radio series The Adventures of Sherlock Holmes. The episode aired on 5 October 1932, with Richard Gordon as Sherlock Holmes and Leigh Lovell as Dr. Watson. A remake of the script aired on 15 October 1936 (with Gordon as Holmes and Harry West as Watson).

Meiser also adapted the story as an episode of the American radio series The New Adventures of Sherlock Holmes, with Basil Rathbone as Holmes and Nigel Bruce as Watson, that aired on 29 September 1940. Another episode in the same series that was also adapted from the story aired on 11 April 1948 (with John Stanley as Holmes and Alfred Shirley as Watson).

John Gielgud played Holmes with Ralph Richardson as Watson in a radio adaptation of the story that aired on NBC radio on 24 April 1955.

Michael Hardwick adapted the story as a radio production that aired on the BBC Light Programme in 1961, as part of the 1952–1969 radio series starring Carleton Hobbs as Holmes and Norman Shelley as Watson, with Noel Johnson as Colonel Moran.

"The Empty House" was dramatised for BBC Radio 4 in 1993 by Bert Coules as part of the 1989–1998 radio series starring Clive Merrison as Holmes and Michael Williams as Watson. It featured Michael Pennington as Professor Moriarty, Frederick Treves as Colonel Moran, Donald Gee as Inspector Lestrade, and Peter Penry-Jones as Sir John.

"The Adventure of the Empty House" was combined with "The Final Problem" for an episode of The Classic Adventures of Sherlock Holmes, a series on the American radio show Imagination Theatre, starring John Patrick Lowrie as Holmes and Lawrence Albert as Watson. The episode, titled "The Return of Sherlock Holmes", first aired in 2009.

In 2026, the podcast Sherlock & Co. adapted the story in a three-episode adventure called "The Empty House", starring Harry Attwell as Sherlock Holmes, Paul Waggott as Dr. John Watson and Marta da Silva as Mariana "Mrs. Hudson" Ametxazurra. In this modern retelling, Sherlock's supposed death has not happened, however Watson is comatose during this story from being shot in a more vital place during their retelling of The Adventure of the Three Garridebs.

=== Other media ===
The story, along with "The Disappearance of Lady Frances Carfax", "The Adventure of Charles Augustus Milverton", and "The Red-Headed League", provided the source material for the 1923 play The Return of Sherlock Holmes.

In 1975, DC Comics published Sherlock Holmes #1, a comic which adapted "The Adventure of the Empty House" and "The Final Problem". It was intended to be an ongoing series, but future issues were cancelled due to low sales.

In the last short story in the book Flashman and the Tiger (1999) by George MacDonald Fraser, Fraser's anti-hero Harry Flashman sets out to murder Moran, who is blackmailing Flashman's granddaughter. He trails Moran to Camden House, but instead witnesses Holmes capture him.

== Baritsu ==
Baritsu is the name given to a form of martial art used to explain how Holmes had avoided falling into the Reichenbach Falls with Professor Moriarty. As Holmes himself explained his survival:

We tottered together upon the brink of the fall. I have some knowledge, however, of baritsu, or the Japanese system of wrestling, which has more than once been very useful to me. I slipped through his grip, and he with a horrible scream kicked madly for a few seconds and clawed the air with both his hands. But for all his efforts he could not get his balance, and over he went.

In 1982 Fromm and Soames, followed by others including Y. Hirayama, J. Hall, Richard Bowen, and James Webb, suggested that Doyle had meant to refer to Bartitsu, an eclectic martial art that had been founded by Londoner E. W. Barton-Wright in 1899: eight years after Holmes had supposedly used it, but two years before publication of the story.

It is uncertain why Holmes referred to "baritsu", rather than "Bartitsu". It is possible that Doyle, who, like Barton-Wright, was writing for Pearson’s Magazine during the late 1890s, was vaguely aware of Bartitsu and simply misremembered or misheard the term, perhaps in part due to Japanese phonology's prohibition on consecutive non-nasal consonants; it may even have been a typographical error, a concern about copyright, or a deliberate alteration to match the aforementioned Japanese phonological pattern. A newspaper report on a Bartitsu demonstration in London, published in 1900, had likewise misspelled the name as "baritsu".

The Japan Sherlock Holmes Club, formed in 1977, evolved from the "Baritsu Chapter" founded in 1948.
