= Arthur Wontner =

British actor (1875–1960)

- Wontner as Sherlock Holmes
- Born: 21 January 1875; London, England
- Died: 10 July 1960 (aged 85); London, England
- Occupation: Actor
- Years active: 1897–1955
- Spouses: Rosecleer Alice Amelia Blanche Kingwell (m. 1903; died 1943) Florence Eileen Lainchbury (m. 1947)
- Children: 3, including Hugh Wontner and Hilary Wontner

Arthur Wontner (21 January 1875 – 10 July 1960) was a British actor and sometime actor-manager, familiar on stage in a wide range of roles, from comedy to melodrama, and classics to musical shows. He also acted in films from 1915 to 1955 and was particularly known for playing Arthur Conan Doyle's master detective Sherlock Holmes in five films from 1931 to 1937.

== Stage career ==
=== Early years ===
Wontner was born in Islington, London, as Arthur Wontner Smith. He was the eldest in the family of four sons and one daughter of Thomas Arthur Smith, partner in Wontner, Smith & Co, stocktakers in the City of London, and his wife, Emily Mary, daughter of Thomas Taylor Wontner, stocktaker. He was educated at the North London Collegiate School. His father intended him to follow the same career as his own but his son chose to become an actor. He made his first appearance on the stage at Ryde, Isle of Wight on 18 April 1897, as Sir Thomas Tenby in The Sorrows of Satan. He next joined Sarah Thorne's company at Margate, and during an eight-month stay, played nearly thirty leading parts. He then toured with Louis Calvert as Poins in Henry IV, Part 2, before making his first appearance on the London stage, at the old Globe Theatre on 22 October 1898, as the Comte de Rochefort in The Three Musketeers.

In 1899 he appeared at the Garrick Theatre in Change Alley, at Terry's Theatre in The Upper Hand, and at the Comedy in The Ghetto. He then toured for four years as leading man with Florence West and Edward Compton, adding fifty parts to his already long list. Sir Herbert Tree engaged him to play Baron Bonelli in The Eternal City and other parts in Australia; he opened at Her Majesty's Theatre, Melbourne in September 1903. He remained in Australia until November 1905, playing played fifteen additional parts. On his return to England he appeared at the Comedy in August 1906 succeeding Gerald du Maurier as A. J. Raffles in Raffles.

After a succession of West End roles Wontner made a substantial success when he appeared at the Globe in September 1909, as Raymond Fleuriot in Madame X. In the same year he changed the family name by deed poll, dropping the "Smith" and turning the given name "Wontner" into a surname. The following year he appeared at His Majesty's in Tree's Shakespeare festival, playing Bassanio in The Merchant of Venice and Laertes in Hamlet.

His roles between then and the start of the First World War included Iokanaan, the prophet, in Oscar Wilde's Salome in a 1911 production at the Court Theatre by Harcourt Williams, with Adeline Bourne as Salome, Golaud in Pelléas and Mélisande, the title role in Ben Hur, Edward Voysey in The Voysey Inheritance, Orsino in Twelfth Night and Sir Robert Chiltern in Wilde's An Ideal Husband.

=== 1920s ===
With Edith Evans in Tiger Cats, 1924

Wontner's most notable role during the wartime years was Captain Hook in Peter Pan in the 1916 production at the New Theatre. One London critic remarked, "lt is a great change for that best of actors in modern comedy, Mr Arthur Wontner, to find himself cast for the part of the burlesque pirate, Captain Hook". During the long run of The Maid of the Mountains he took over the role of Baldassarre, the leading man to José Collins. According to The Times, "For the next few years Wontner was, after Owen Nares, the most likely casting for a leading part of a romantic type on the London stage. Of the two men he had the more ascetic appearance and the more vibrant voice". Like Nares, Wontner went into actor-management, but the play he chose, a comedy by A. A. Milne, was only moderately successful. After supporting José Collins in two more musical plays, Wontner played opposite Edith Evans in Tiger Cats and was Buckingham in Lewis Casson's production of Shakespeare's Henry VIII.

In 1926 Wontner made his Broadway début, as D'Alguines in The Captive. The play, which focused on lesbianism, caused a scandal and after 160 performances the cast were briefly arrested and the production closed. Also in the cast was Basil Rathbone, who, like Wontner, later played Sherlock Holmes on film. The following year Wontner toured the US playing Sir John Marley in Interference, a thriller by Roland Pertwee and Harold Dearden. He returned to the US in 1928. again touring in Interference.

=== 1930s and later ===
Back in London, Wontner played Cardinal Richelieu in a musical adaptation of The Three Musketeers at Drury Lane in March 1930. Later in the year he played Sexton Blake in a stage adaptation by Donald Stuart of stories about the detective. The Stage called the character Blake "a sort of parallel to or pale reflex of Conan Doyle's more famous Sherlock Holmes" and found that Wontner had "no difficulty in dealing with the calmly optimistic detective as imperturbably cocksure in making deductions and as persistent a smoker as the illustrious Holmes".

Wontner's other stage roles in the 1930s included Joseph Fouché in Napoleon: the Hundred Days, written by Benito Mussolini and Giovacchino Forzano and adapted for the English stage by John Drinkwater, The play was not a success, and within a month Wontner was free to play Malvolio in Twelfth Night in a production by Robert Atkins, with Atkins as Sir Toby, Phyllis Neilson-Terry as Olivia and Jean Forbes-Robertson as Viola. The reviewer in The Stage wrote:

Mr Wontner, giving a reading somewhat more forcible perhaps than usual of the sorely gulled and maltreated steward, made much also of the skilfully treated Letter and Cross-Garters scenes … and of the frenzied appeals from behind the prison bars to the false Sir Topaz of Mr John Laurie, making one of the hits of the revival as Feste.

Wontner's later stage roles included Sir Lawrence Wargrave in a stage adaptation of the Agatha Christie novel subsequently retitled And Then There Were None. He took part in four more plays in London in the years following it, before announcing his retirement at the end of 1955, within two months of his 81st birthday.

== Film career ==
=== Sherlock Holmes ===
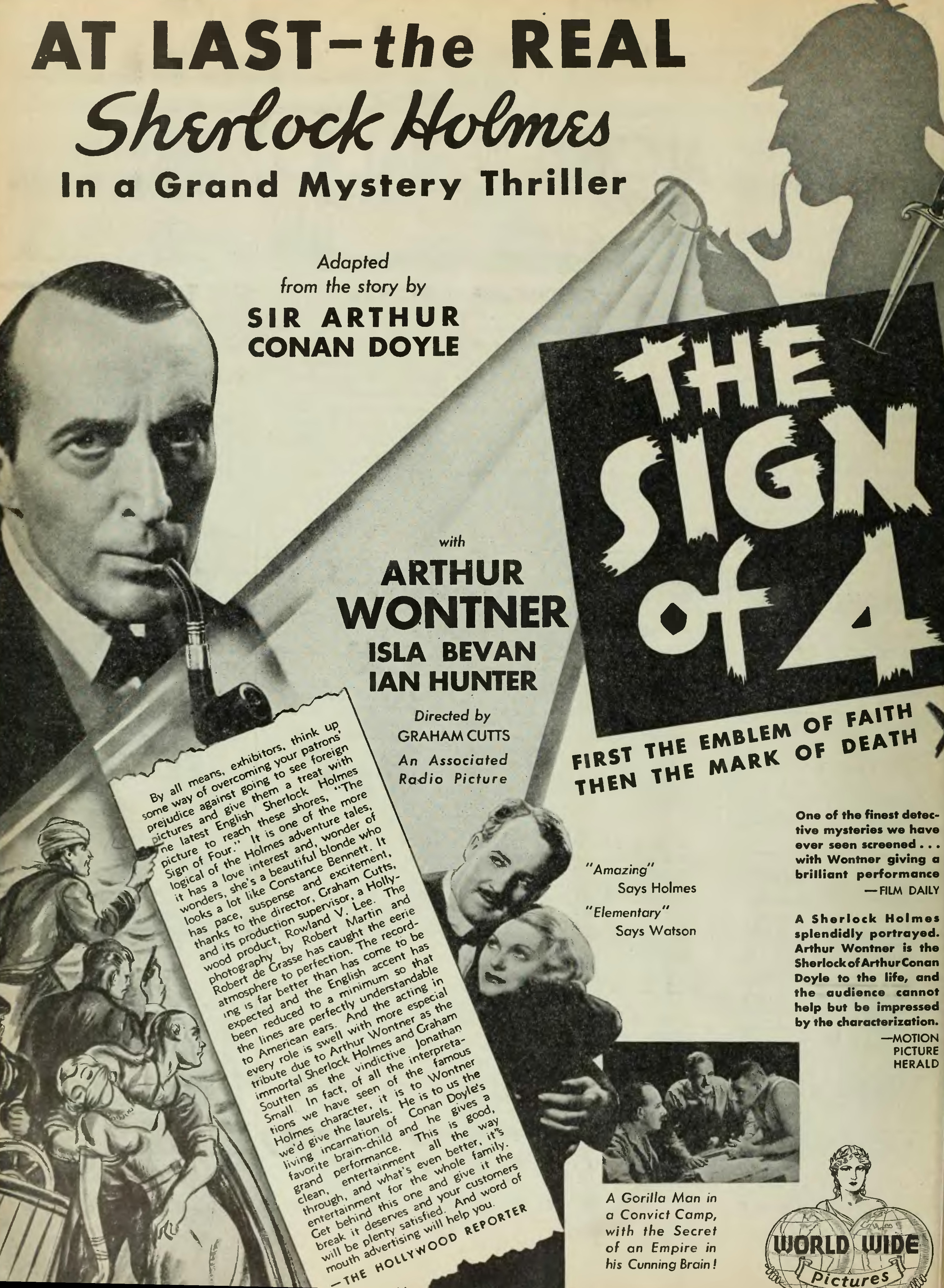
The Sign of 4, from The Film Daily, 1932

Wontner landed the role of Sherlock Holmes thanks to his performance of the Holmes derivative Sexton Blake, in a 1930 stage production. He played the famed sleuth in five films from 1931 to 1937.

- The Sleeping Cardinal (1931) (US title: Sherlock Holmes' Fatal Hour), based on Doyle's two stories, "The Final Problem" and "The Adventure of the Empty House"
- The Missing Rembrandt (1932) (still considered lost), based on "The Adventure of Charles Augustus Milverton"
- The Sign of Four: Sherlock Holmes' Greatest Case (1932)
- The Triumph of Sherlock Holmes (1935), based on The Valley of Fear
- Silver Blaze (1937) (US title: Murder at the Baskervilles, release 1941), based on "The Adventure of Silver Blaze"

Of the five films in which Wontner portrayed Sherlock Holmes, The Missing Rembrandt is no longer available. It is officially a lost film.

Silver Blaze was renamed Murder at the Baskervilles on its US release in order to make the most of the publicity which had been generated by Basil Rathbone's version of The Hound of the Baskervilles.

Wontner was considered to have a strong resemblance to Sidney Paget's drawings of Holmes featured in The Strand Magazine. After seeing The Sleeping Cardinal, Vincent Starrett said "Surely no better Sherlock Holmes than Arthur Wontner is likely to be seen and heard in pictures, in our time."

== Other work ==
In his Who's Who entry, Wontner concluded: "On the Radio since 1925; Television since 1937; Treasurer of the British Actors' Equity Association, 1930–41; a Trustee of the Valentine Memorial Pension Fund; formerly a Member of London Theatre Council; for more than 25 years a Member of the Committee of the Actors' Orphanage".

== Personal life ==
Wontner was twice married. His first wife, Rosecleer Alice Kingwell, whose stage name was Rose Pendennis, died in 1943 and Wontner later married Florence Eileen Lainchbury. He had two sons and one daughter by his first marriage; one son became the well-known hotelier and Lord Mayor of London Sir Hugh Wontner, and the other son was actor Hilary Wontner. Wontner died on 10 July 1960 at his home, 177 Holland Park Avenue, London.

== Selected filmography ==
- The Bigamist (1915)
- Temptation's Hour (1916)
- Lady Windermere's Fan (1916) – Lord Darlington
- Bonnie Prince Charlie (1923) – Lord Kingsburgh
- Eugene Aram (1924) – Eugene Aram
- The Diamond Man (1924) – Lady Marshalt
- The Infamous Lady (1928) – The KC
- The Sleeping Cardinal (1931) – Sherlock Holmes
- A Gentleman of Paris (1931) – Judge Le Fevre
- Condemned to Death (1932) – Sir Charles Wallington
- The Missing Rembrandt (1932) – Sherlock Holmes
- The Sign of Four (1932) – Sherlock Holmes
- The Triumph of Sherlock Holmes (1935) – Sherlock Holmes
- Royal Cavalcade (1935) – Minor role (uncredited)
- Line Engaged (1935) – Inspector Morland
- Dishonour Bright (1936) – Judge
- Second Bureau (1936) – Colonel Gueraud
- Thunder in the City (1937) – Sir Peter
- Storm in a Teacup (1937) – Fiscal
- Silver Blaze (1937) – Sherlock Holmes
- The Live Wire (1937) – Montell
- Just like a Woman (1938) – Escubar
- The Terror (1938) – Colonel Redmayne
- 13 Men and a Gun (1938) – Captain
- Kate Plus Ten (1938) – Colonel Westhanger
- Old Iron (1938) – Judge
- The Life and Death of Colonel Blimp (1943) – Embassy Counsellor
- Blanche Fury (1948) – Lord Rudford
- The Elusive Pimpernel (1950) – Lord Grenville
- Brandy for the Parson (1952) – Major Glockleigh
- Genevieve (1953) – Old Gentleman
- Sea Devils (1953) – Baron de Baudrec
- Three Cases of Murder (1955) – Leader of the House (segment "Lord Mountdrago") (uncredited) (final film role)

=== Sources ===
- Barnes, Alan (2002). Sherlock Holmes on Screen. London: Reynolds & Hearn. ISBN 1-903111-04-8.
- Bunson, Matthew (1997). Encyclopedia Sherlockiana: An A-to-Z Guide to the World of the Great Detective. London: Macmillan. ISBN 0-02-861679-0.
- Eyles, Allen (1986). Sherlock Holmes: A Centenary Celebration. New York: Harper & Row. ISBN 0-06-015620-1.
- Parker, John; Freda Gaye; Ian Herbert, eds. (1978). Who Was Who in the Theatre. Detroit: Gale Research. OCLC 310466458.
- Starrett, Vincent (1993). The Private Life of Sherlock Holmes. New York: Otto Penzler Books. ISBN 1-883402-05-0.
- Sova, Dawn (2003). Banned Plays: Censorship Histories of 125 Stage Dramas. New York: Facts on File. ISBN 978-1-43-812993-8.
- Tanitch, Robert (1999). Oscar Wilde on Stage and Screen. London: Methuen. ISBN 978-0-41-372610-0.
