= The Newly Discovered Casebook of Sherlock Holmes =

The Newly Discovered Casebook of Sherlock Holmes is a BBC Radio 2 comedy series written by Tony Hare. It starred Roy Hudd, Chris Emmett, Jeffrey Holland, and June Whitfield, and was broadcast between 16 January 1999, to 20 February 1999. It has since been re-broadcast on BBC Radio 4 Extra (formerly called BBC Radio 7).

The burlesque series was a comic pastiche of Sir Arthur Conan Doyle's fictional detective Sherlock Holmes. The series was recorded in front of a live audience and each 30 minute episode was broadcast on BBC Radio 2 at 1 pm, making some of the rude, and occasionally crude, jokes rather risqué for the time of day.

Hudd, Emmett, and Whitfield had all worked together on the very long-running radio series The News Huddlines. Holland is a familiar voice in British comedy series, probably best known for his role as camp comic Spike Dixon in the BBC sitcom Hi-de-Hi!

Hudd later appeared alongside Clive Merrison as Holmes, and Andrew Sachs as Doctor Watson in an original radio play in the series The Further Adventures of Sherlock Holmes in 2002.

== Episode guide ==
Episode	Title	First broadcast
1	The Case of the Clockwork Fiend	16 January 1999
2	The Mystery of the Obese Escapologist	23 January 1999
3	The Case of the Deranged Botanist	30 January 1999
4	Sherlock Holmes and the Glorious Doppelganger	6 February 1999
5	Holmes Strikes a Happy Medium	13 February 1999
6	The Demon Cobbler of Greek Street	20 February 1999

== Cast ==
- Roy Hudd as Sherlock Holmes
- Chris Emmett as Dr. Watson
- June Whitfield as Mrs. Hudson and other females
- Geoffrey Whitehead as Professor Moriarty and other males
- Jeffrey Holland as Inspector Lestrade and other males
