= The Return of Sherlock Holmes (play) =

The Return of Sherlock Holmes is a play written by J. E. Harold Terry and Arthur Rose and originally starring Eille Norwood as Sherlock Holmes. The play premiered at Princes Theatre on October 9, 1923.

Based on the work of Sir Arthur Conan Doyle, the play incorporated aspects of four stories: "The Adventure of the Empty House", "The Adventure of Charles Augustus Milverton", "The Disappearance of Lady Frances Carfax", and "The Red-Headed League". Actor Eille Norwood had previously portrayed Holmes in the Stoll film series from 1921 to 1923.

== Cast ==
- Eille Norwood as Sherlock Holmes
- H. G. Stoker as Dr. Watson
- Molly Kerr as Lady Frances Carfax
- Arthur Cullin as Reverend Doctor Shlessinger
- Noel Dainton as Hon. Philip Green
- Paul Gill as Inspector Lestrade
- Lauderdale Maitland as Colonel Sebastian Moran
- Eric Stanley as Charles Augustus Milverton
- Ann Desmond as Jenny Saunders
- Esmé Hubbard as Mrs. Hudson
