= Silver Blaze (1937 film) =

- U.S. poster
- Directed by: Thomas Bentley
- Written by: Arthur Conan Doyle (story "The Adventure of Silver Blaze"); H. Fowler Mear (adaptation); Arthur Macrae
- Produced by: Julius Hagen
- Starring: Arthur Wontner; Ian Fleming
- Cinematography: Sydney Blythe; William Luff
- Edited by: Michael C. Chorlton; Alan Smith
- Music by: H. Baynton Power
- Distributed by: Associated British Picture Corporation
- Release date: July 1937
- Running time: 71 minutes USA: 65 minutes (TCM print)
- Country: United Kingdom
- Language: English

Silver Blaze is a 1937 British black-and-white crime mystery film, based loosely on Arthur Conan Doyle's 1892 short story "The Adventure of Silver Blaze". It was directed by Thomas Bentley, and was produced by Twickenham Film Studios Productions. It stars Arthur Wontner as Sherlock Holmes, and Ian Fleming as Dr. Watson. In the United States, the film was released in 1941 by Astor Pictures, where it was also known as Murder at the Baskervilles, retitled by distributors to capitalize on the success of the Basil Rathbone Holmes film, The Hound of the Baskervilles.

It is the last film in the 1931–1937 film series starring Wontner as Sherlock Holmes.

== Synopsis ==
In the 1930s, Sherlock Holmes (Arthur Wontner) takes a holiday by visiting his old friend, Sir Henry Baskerville (Lawrence Grossmith). Holmes' vacation ends when he and Watson suddenly find themselves in the middle of a double-murder mystery; they must find Professor Robert Moriarty (Lyn Harding) and Silver Blaze before the horse race, and bring the criminals to justice.

== Cast ==
- Arthur Wontner as Sherlock Holmes
- Ian Fleming as Dr. Watson
- Lyn Harding as Professor Moriarty
- John Turnbull as Inspector Lestrade
- Robert Horton as Col. Ross
- Lawrence Grossmith as Sir Henry Baskerville
- Judy Gunn as Diana Baskerville
- Arthur Macrae as Jack Trevor
- Arthur Goullet as Col. Sebastian Moran
- Martin Walker as James Straker
- Eve Gray as Mrs. Mary Straker
- Gilbert Davis as Miles Stanford
- Minnie Rayner as Mrs. Hudson
- D. J. Williams as Silas Brown
- Ralph Truman as Bert Prince
- Ronald Shiner as Simpson the Stable Boy / Jockey (uncredited)

== Critical reception ==
In a retrospective review, TV Guide wrote that the film "suffers from too slight a plot stretched out to feature length. Wontner is good in his final portrayal of the great detective, and the film does have some interesting moments; but on the whole this is lackluster Holmes, an all too elementary case."
