= The Missing Rembrandt =

1932 film

- Directed by: Leslie S. Hiscott
- Written by: H. Fowler Mear; Cyril Twyford; Arthur Conan Doyle (character of Sherlock Holmes)
- Produced by: Julius Hagen
- Starring: Arthur Wontner; Jane Welsh; Miles Mander
- Cinematography: Sydney Blythe; Basil Emmott
- Edited by: Jack Harris
- Distributed by: Twickenham Studios
- Release dates: February 1932 (UK); 25 March 1932 (US)
- Running time: 84 minutes
- Country: United Kingdom
- Language: English

The Missing Rembrandt (also known as Sherlock Holmes and the Missing Rembrandt, The Case of the Missing Rembrandt, The Strange Case of the Missing Rembrandt and The Adventure of the Missing Rembrandt) is a 1932 British mystery film directed by Leslie S. Hiscott and starring Arthur Wontner, Jane Welsh, Miles Mander, and Francis L. Sullivan. It was written by H. Fowler Mear and Cyril Twyford, loosely based on the 1904 Sherlock Holmes story "The Adventure of Charles Augustus Milverton" by Arthur Conan Doyle.

It is the second film in the 1931–1937 film series starring Wontner as Sherlock Holmes.

== Preservation status ==
It is considered a lost film. The British Film Institute National Archive holds a collection of stills but no film or video materials.

== Plot ==
Sherlock Holmes goes on the trail of a Rembrandt painting, stolen by a drug-addicted artist.

== Cast ==
- Arthur Wontner as Sherlock Holmes
- Jane Welsh as Lady Violet Lamsden
- Miles Mander as Claude Holford
- Francis L. Sullivan as Baron Von Guntermann
- Ian Fleming as Dr. Watson
- Dino Galvani as Carlo Ravelli
- Philip Hewland as Inspector Lestrade
- Minnie Rayner as Mrs. Hudson
- Herbert Lomas as Manning

== Reception ==
Film Weekly wrote: "Smoothly produced but lacking in real thrills or suspense. The more entertaining moments in a rather dull film arise from Arthur Wontner's habit, in the character of Holmes, of pulling Dr. Watson's leg. ... Wontner is, however a good Sherlock Holmes, even if he does not fit in with everybody's conception of the character. Ian Fleming admirably conveys the amiable stupidity of Dr. Watson, and Francis L. Sullivan is a fairly convincing villain."

Kine Weekly wrote: "Arthur Wontner is Holmes personified, and the quality of the entertainment lies principally in his intriguing performance. The directorial work is efficient, a good atmosphere prevails, and the team work of the supporting players is commendable."

The Daily Film Renter wrote: "Tempo very slow, but notable for Arthur Wontner's striking portrayal of Sherlock Holmes, which is an outstanding aspect of the picture."

Variety wrote: "Starting off promisingly with a raid on a Chinese den in Limehouse, the picture reverts after this first sequence to a pace too slow to make for interest. It is not helped any by a poor adaptation which fails to add mental suggestion to the occasional spectacle of people shooting off guns. Real suspense is almost wholly lacking and the story is not made sufficiently graphic to hold the interest."

The New York Times reviewer wrote that, though it is "slightly changed as to action and entirely as to title, provides both excitement and laughter" and "brings back a number of screen actors who by this time seem to be perfectly at home in their parts."

== See also ==
- List of lost films
