= The Sleeping Cardinal =

1931 film

- U.S. trade ad in Moving Picture Daily
- Directed by: Leslie S. Hiscott
- Written by: Arthur Conan Doyle (stories); Leslie S. Hiscott; H. Fowler Mear; Cyril Twyford
- Produced by: Julius Hagen
- Starring: Arthur Wontner; Ian Fleming; Philip Hewland; Jane Welsh
- Cinematography: Sydney Blythe; William Luff
- Edited by: Jack Harris
- Music by: John Greenwood
- Production company: Twickenham Studios
- Distributed by: Warner Bros. Pictures, Inc. (UK); First Division Pictures (US)
- Release date: February 1931
- Running time: 84 minutes
- Country: United Kingdom
- Language: English

The Sleeping Cardinal (U.S. title: Sherlock Holmes' Fatal Hour) is a 1931 British mystery film directed by Leslie S. Hiscott and starring Arthur Wontner and Ian Fleming. The film is an adaptation, by Hiscott, H. Fowler Mear and Cyril Twyford, of the Sherlock Holmes stories by Arthur Conan Doyle. Although it is not based on any one particular story, it draws inspiration from "The Empty House" and "The Final Problem". The film is the first in the 1931–1937 series starring Wontner as Holmes.

The film was produced at Twickenham Studios in London with sets designed by art director James A. Carter.

== Plot ==
In London, young diplomatic attaché Ronnie Adair, is playing bridge when he is called to a meeting with Professor Moriarty and blackmailed into transporting counterfeit money to Paris in his diplomatic pouch. Adair's concerned sister calls for the assistance of Sherlock Holmes and Dr. Watson to investigate the reasons for her brother's gambling excesses and depressed moods. After Adair dies from an apparent suicide, Holmes deduces Moriarty's involvement from a trail of clues.

== Cast ==
- Arthur Wontner as Sherlock Holmes
- Ian Fleming as Dr. Watson
- Philip Hewland as Inspector Lestrade
- Jane Welsh as Kathleen Adair
- Norman McKinnel as Prof. Moriarty, alias Col. Henslowe
- Minnie Rayner as Mrs. Hudson
- Leslie Perrins as Ronald Adair
- Gordon Begg as Marston, the butler
- William Fazan as Thomas Fisher
- Sydney King as Tony Rutherford
- Louis Goodrich as Colonel Sebastian Moran
- Harry Terry as No. 16
- Charles Paton as J.J. Godfrey

== Reception ==
Film Weekly wrote: "It has strong suspense, well maintained until the climax, and a novel but well acted portrayal of the criminologist by Arthur Wontner."

Kine Weekly wrote: "A excellent detective drama, British all through, which is adapted from two well-known stories by Conan Doyle. The play is cleverly constructed, and succeeds in keeping the interest maintained until the very end. Hiscott's direction is capable and allows movement and change of scenes to punctuate the good dialogue, while Arthur Wontner is admirable as Sherlock Holmes and brings life to the immortal character."

The New York Times wrote: "There are secret doors leading into strange compartments and rooms, and there are scufflings and caterwaulings in dark corridors. All the characters express their contempt for one another by that sinister laugh—the 'ha, ha' which preceded the 'yeah' of modern gangdom. Detective Holmes barely escapes with his life, and the dear Dr. Watson is drawn away by innumerable red herrings."
