= List of actors who have played Dr. Watson =

The following is a list of actors who have played Dr. Watson in various media.

== Radio and audio dramas ==
Name	Title	Date	Type
F. H. Oliver	The Sign of the Four	1922	Radio (WGY)
Leigh Lovell	The Adventures of Sherlock Holmes	1930–1935	Radio (NBC Blue Network)
Reginald Mason	Lux Radio Theatre – "Sherlock Holmes"	1935	Radio adaptation of the play (NBC)
Harry West	The Adventures of Sherlock Holmes	1936	Radio (Mutual, NBC)
Ray Collins	The Mercury Theatre on the Air – "Sherlock Holmes"	1938	Radio adaptation of the play (CBS)
Nigel Bruce	The New Adventures of Sherlock Holmes	1940–1947	Radio (Mutual, ABC)
Carleton Hobbs	The Boscombe Valley Mystery	1943	BBC Home Service
Ralph Truman	My Dear Watson	1943	BBC Home Service
Finlay Currie	The Adventure of the Speckled Band (two productions)	1945, 1948	BBC Home Service
Norman Shelley	Silver Blaze	1945	BBC Home Service
Norman Shelley	Sherlock Holmes	1952–1969	Radio series (BBC)
Alfred Shirley	The New Adventures of Sherlock Holmes	1947–1948	Radio (Mutual)
Ian Martin	The New Adventures of Sherlock Holmes	1948	Radio (Mutual)
Wendell Holmes	The New Adventures of Sherlock Holmes	1948–1949	Radio (Mutual)
Eric Snowden	The New Adventures of Sherlock Holmes	1949–1950	Radio (ABC)
Ralph Richardson	The Adventures of Sherlock Holmes	1954	Radio series (BBC Light Programme)
Bryan Coleman	The Sign of Four	1959	BBC Light Programme
Kenneth Baker	Sherlock Holmes	1967	South African Broadcasting Corporation
Nigel Stock	Sherlock Holmes	1970–1971	LP record series
Dinsdale Landon	A Study in Scarlet	1974	BBC Radio 4
Lloyd Battista	CBS Radio Mystery Theater – "The Hound of the Baskervilles"	1977	Radio (CBS)
Court Benson	CBS Radio Mystery Theater'	1977–1981	Radio (CBS)
David Buck	Sherlock Holmes	1978	Radio series (BBC Radio 4)
Kerry Jordan	The Stories of Sherlock Holmes	1979–1985	Radio series (Springbok Radio)
Timothy West	Sherlock Holmes vs. Dracula	1981	BBC radio dramatisation of the novel
Bernard Grant	CBS Radio Mystery Theater – "The Naval Treaty"	1982	Radio (CBS)
William Griffis	CBS Radio Mystery Theater – "The Reigate Mystery"	1982	Radio (CBS)
Andrew Hilton	The Mystery of the Reluctant Storyteller and The Valley of Fear	1986	BBC Radio 4
Crawford Logan	The Hound of the Baskervilles	1988	BBC Radio 4
Crawford Logan	The Adventure of the Pimlico Poisoner	1990	BBC Radio 4
Norman Rodway	The Singular Case of Sherlock H. and Sigmund F.	1988	BBC Radio 3
Michael Williams	BBC Radio Sherlock Holmes (the entire canon)	1989–1998	BBC Radio 4
Ian Hogg	The Seven-Per-Cent Solution	1993	BBC radio dramatisation of the novel
Nicky Henson	The Unopened Casebook of Sherlock Holmes	1993	Radio series (BBC Radio 5)
Lawrence Albert	The Further Adventures of Sherlock Holmes (American series)	1998–present	Radio series (Imagination Theatre)
Lawrence Albert	The Classic Adventures of Sherlock Holmes (the entire canon)	2005–2016	Radio series (Imagination Theatre)
Chris Emmett	The Newly Discovered Casebook of Sherlock Holmes	1999	BBC Radio 2
Shaun Prendergast	The Beekeeper's Apprentice	2000	BBC Radio 4
Thomas Arnold	A Capital Case: Karl Marx Meets Sherlock Holmes	2001	BBC Radio 4
Andrew Sachs	The Further Adventures of Sherlock Holmes (British series)	2002–2010	BBC Radio 4
Kristoffer Tabori	Sherlock Holmes Theatre	2006	Hollywood Theatre of the Ear
Richard Earl	Sherlock Holmes	2010–2022	Audio dramas (Big Finish Productions)
William Windom	Sherlock Holmes	2011	California Artists Radio Theatre
Geoffrey Arend	The Hound of the Baskervilles	2014	Audio drama (L.A. Theatre Works)
Anthony D.P. Mann	The Hound of the Baskervilles	2017	Audio play (Bleak December Inc.)
Stephen Critchlow	Mrs Hudson's Radio Show	2018	BBC Radio 4
Amir Sám Nakhjavani	Genius	2019-2020	Scripted podcast
Kobna Holdbrook-Smith	Sherlock Holmes: The Voice of Treason	2020	Audio drama (Audible Original)
Dominic Brewer	The Blue Carbuncle	2021	Scripted reading
Stephen Fry	The Hound of the Baskervilles	2021	Audio drama (Audible Original)
Adam Godley	Moriarty	2022–2026	Audio drama (Audible Original)
Sanjeev Bhaskar	The Hound of the Baskervilles: A Concert Drama	2023	Radio play (BBC Radio 3)
Paul Waggott	Sherlock & Co.	2023–present	Scripted podcast (Goalhanger Podcasts)
Bran Peacock	Madison on the Air	2024-2025	Scripted podcast
Jack Koenig	Sherlock Holmes & the Nefarious Baron	2026	Live radio play (American)
John Leeson	Sir Sherlock	2026–	Audio drama (British)

== Stage plays ==
Name	Title	Date	Type
Seymour Hicks	Under The Clock	1893	Stage (Royal Court Theatre)
St. John Hamund	Sherlock Holmes	1894	Stage (Royalty Theatre, Glasgow)
Bruce McRae	Sherlock Holmes	1899	Broadway (American)
Kenneth Rivington	Sherlock Holmes	1905	Stage (British)
Kenneth Rivington	The Speckled Band	1921–1922	Stage (British)
H. Lawrence Leyton	Sherlock Holmes	1905	Stage (British)
H. Lawrence Leyton	The Speckled Band	1910	Stage (British)
Claude King	The Speckled Band	1910	Stage (British)
R.V. Taylour	The Crown Diamond	1921	Stage (British)
H. G. Stoker	The Return of Sherlock Holmes	1923	Stage (British)
Jack Raine	Sherlock Holmes	1953	Stage (American)
Peter Sallis	Baker Street	1965	Musical (American)
Tim Pigott-Smith	Sherlock Holmes	1974	Stage revival (British)
Dennis Cooney	Sherlock Holmes	1974	Stage revival (American)
Timothy Landfield	The Crucifer of Blood	1978	Broadway (American)
Denis Lill	The Crucifer of Blood	1979	Stage (London)
Richard Woods	Sherlock Holmes	1981	Stage revival (Williamstown Theater Festival), filmed for TV
Jeremy Brett	The Crucifer of Blood	1981	Stage (Los Angeles)
Edward Woodward	Murder Dear Watson	1983	Stage (British)
Alan Stanford	The Mask of Moriarty	1985	Stage (Dublin)
Donal Donnelly	Sherlock's Last Case	1987	Stage (Nederlander Theatre)
John Nicholson	The Hound of the Baskervilles	2007	Stage (West Yorkshire Playhouse)
Karl Graboshas	Sherlock Holmes	2013	Play by Greg Kramer (Canada)
Nigel Fairs	To Kill a Canary	2014	Stage (Britain)
Lucas Hall	Baskerville: A Sherlock Holmes Mystery	2015	Arena Stage in Southwest, Washington, D.C.
Usman Ally	Baskerville: A Sherlock Holmes Mystery	2015	Old Globe Theatre in San Diego, California
James Maslow	Sherlock Holmes	2015	Play by Greg Kramer
Patrick Robinson	Baskerville: A Sherlock Holmes Mystery	2017–2018	Liverpool Playhouse
Joseph Derrington	Sherlock Holmes – The Sign of Four	2018–2019	UK theatre tour
Ramiz Monsef	Mysterious Circumstances	2019	Geffen Playhouse (America)
Tim Marriott	Watson: The Final Problem	2020-present	One-man play by Marriott and Bert Coules
Roland Kalweit	Sherlock Holmes und der Hund der Baskervilles	2023–2025	European theatre tour
Terry Molloy	The Hound of the Baskervilles	2022–2025	Live script reading
Terry Molloy	The Sign of Four	2025–2026	Live script reading
David Horton	Sherlock Holmes and the Sign of Four	2024	Opera (UK)
Helena Antoniou	The Hound of the Baskervilles	2024	Stage (Britain)
David Reed	Sherlock Holmes and The 12 Days of Christmas	2025–2026	Stage (Britain)

== Television and DTV films ==
Name	Title	Date	Type
William Podmore	The Three Garridebs	1937	Television play for NBC (American)
Campbell Singer	The Man Who Disappeared	1951	Television pilot (British)
Raymond Francis	We Present Alan Wheatley as Mr. Sherlock Holmes in...	1951	Television series (British)
Philip King	The Mazarin Stone	1951	Television film for BBC (British)
Bernard Fox	The Hound of the Baskervilles	1972	Television film (American)
Edward Fox	Doctor Watson and the Darkwater Hall Mystery	1974	Television film (British)
Patrick Macnee	Sherlock Holmes in New York	1976	Television film (American)
Patrick Macnee	Sherlock Holmes and the Leading Lady	1991	Television film
Patrick Macnee	Incident at Victoria Falls	1992	Television film
Thorley Walters	Silver Blaze	1977	Television film (Canadian)
Richard Woods	Standing Room Only – Sherlock Holmes	1981	Television play for HBO (American)
Terence Rigby	The Hound of the Baskervilles	1982	Television serial (British)
Earle Cross	Sherlock Holmes and the Valley of Fear	1983	Animated television films; voice only (Australian)
Earle Cross	Sherlock Holmes and the Sign of Four	1983	Animated television films; voice only (Australian)
Earle Cross	Sherlock Holmes and the Baskerville Curse	1983	Animated television films; voice only (Australian)
Earle Cross	Sherlock Holmes and a Study in Scarlet	1983	Animated television films; voice only (Australian)
David Healy	The Sign of Four	1983	Television film (British-American)
Donald Churchill	The Hound of the Baskervilles	1983	Television film (British-American)
John Mills	The Masks of Death	1984	Television film (British)
John Hillerman	Hands of a Murderer	1990	Television film (British)
Richard Johnson	The Crucifer of Blood	1991	TV film adaptation of the play (American)
John Scott-Paget	The Hound of London	1993	Television film (Canadian-Luxembourgian)
Kenneth Welsh	The Hound of the Baskervilles	2000	Television films (Canadian)
Kenneth Welsh	The Sign of Four	2001	Television films (Canadian)
Kenneth Welsh	The Royal Scandal	2001	Television films (Canadian)
Kenneth Welsh	The Case of the Whitechapel Vampire	2002	Television films (Canadian)
Ian Hart	The Hound of the Baskervilles	2002	Television film (British)
Ian Hart	Sherlock Holmes and the Case of the Silk Stocking	2004	Television film (British)
Roger Morlidge	Sherlock: Case of Evil	2002	Television film (American)
Bill Paterson	Sherlock Holmes and the Baker Street Irregulars	2007	BBC television film (British)
Gareth David-Lloyd	Sherlock Holmes	2010	DTV film (American)
John Rhys-Davies	Tom and Jerry Meet Sherlock Holmes	2010	Animated DTV film; voice only (American)
Terry Wade	Sherlock Holmes and the Shadow Watchers	2011	DTV film (Canadian)
Douglas McFerran	Sherlock Holmes Confidential	2013	Online short film (British)
Geraint Hill	How Sherlock Changed the World	2013	Documentary (American)
Harry Dillon	Holmes: The Myth of Whitechapel	2025	Short film/television pilot
Ciaran Cresswell	Moriarty Rising: A Sherlock Holmes Tale	2027	Microdrama/feature film dual release (American-Italian)

== Television series ==
Name	Title	Date	Type
Victor Moore	Texaco Star Theatre – "Sherlock Holmes in the Mystery of the Sen Sen Murder"	1949	TV episode (American)
Melville Cooper	Your Show Time – "The Speckled Band"	1949	TV episode (American)
Raymond Francis	Sherlock Holmes	1951	TV series (British)
Jack Raine	Suspense – "The Adventure of the Black Baronet"	1953	TV episode (American)
H. Marion-Crawford	Sherlock Holmes	1954–1955	TV series (American-French)
William Mervyn	Endless Adventure – "Episode dated 7 December 1959"	1959	TV episode (British)
Nigel Stock	Sherlock Holmes	1965–1968	TV series (British)
Paul Edwin Roth	Sherlock Holmes	1967–1968	TV series (Germany)
Gianni Bonagura	Sherlock Holmes	1968	TV series (Italy)
Donald Pickering	Sherlock Holmes and Doctor Watson	1979	TV series (American-Polish)
David Simeon/Dudley Stevens	End of Part One – "The Adventures of Sherlock Holmes"	1979	TV sketch (British)
Vitaly Solomin	The Adventures of Sherlock Holmes and Dr. Watson	1979–1986	TV film series (USSR)
Donald O'Connor	Fantasy Island – "The Case Against Mr. Roarke/Save Sherlock Holmes"	1982	TV episode (American)
Hubert Rees	The Baker Street Boys	1983	TV series (British)
Kōsei Tomita	Sherlock Hound	1984–1985	TV animated series (Italian-Japanese) (Japanese version)
Lewis Arquette	Sherlock Hound	1984–1985	TV animated series (Italian-Japanese) (English dub)
Riccardo Garrone	Sherlock Hound	1984–1985	TV animated series (Italian-Japanese) (Italian dub)
David Burke	Sherlock Holmes	1984–1985	TV series (British)
Edward Hardwicke	Sherlock Holmes	1986–1994	TV series (British)
Patrick Monckton	Alfred Hitchcock Presents – "My Dear Watson"	1989	TV episode (American)
Maurice LaMarche	The Real Ghostbusters – "Elementary My Dear Wintson"	1989	Animated TV episode (American)
Lorenzo Music	Garfield and Friends – "Hound of the Arbuckles/U.S. Acres: Read Alert/Urban Arbuckle"	1990	Animated TV episode (American)
Pat Fraley	Teenage Mutant Ninja Turtles – "Elementary, My Dear Turtle"	1990	Animated TV episode (American)
Phil Hartman	Saturday Night Live – "Sherlock Holmes' Birthday Party"	1991	TV sketch (American)
Max Casella	Doogie Howser, M.D. – "The Adventures of Sherlock Howser"	1993	TV episode (American)
Alexei Sayle	The All New Alexei Sayle Show – "Sherlock Holmes & Watson"	1994	TV sketch (British)
John Payne	Sherlock Holmes in the 22nd Century	1999–2001	Animated TV series (British-American)
Jim Piddock	Batman: The Brave and the Bold – "Trials of the Demon!"	2009	Animated TV series (American)
Martin Freeman	Sherlock	2010–2017	TV series (British)
Lucy Liu	Elementary	2012–2019	TV series (American)
Kyle Mooney	Epic Rap Battles of History – "Batman vs. Sherlock Holmes"	2012	Online series episode (American)
Andrei Panin	Sherlock Holmes	2013	TV series (Russian)
Wataru Takagi	Sherlock Holmes	2014–2015	TV series (Japanese)
Tao Tsuchiya	IQ246: The Cases of a Royal Genius	2016	TV series (Japanese)
Shihori Kanjiya	Miss Sherlock	2018	TV series (Japanese)
Takanori Iwata	Sherlock: Untold Stories	2019	TV series (Japanese)
Yuichi Nakamura	Case File nº221: Kabukicho	2019–2020	TV anime series (Japanese) (Japanese version)
Josh Grelle	Case File nº221: Kabukicho	2019–2020	TV anime series (Japanese) (English dub)
Yūki Ono	Moriarty the Patriot	2020–2021	TV anime series (Japanese)
Ryan Colt Levy	Moriarty the Patriot	2021	TV anime series (English dub)
Zoe Doyle	Ghostwriter – "The Case of The Missing Ghost"	2020	TV series (American-Canadian)
Andrey Feskov	Sherlock in Russia	2020	TV series (Russian)
Royce Pierreson	The Irregulars	2021	TV series (British-American)
Taisuke Nishimura	Lupin the 3rd Part 6	2021–2022	TV anime series (Japanese)
Joe Hernandez	Lupin the 3rd Part 6	2022	TV anime series (English dub)
Masaki Aizawa	Undead Girl Murder Farce	2023	TV anime series (Japanese)
Sanjeev Bhaskar	Inside Classical - "The Hound of the Baskervilles"	2023	Televised concert (British)
Ranvir Shorey	Shekhar Home	2024	TV series (Indian)
Morris Chestnut	Watson	2025–2026	TV series (American)
Kevin Vidal	Watson - "Take a Family History"	2025	TV series (American)
Seán Duggan	Sherlock & Daughter	2025	TV series (American)
Miguel Ferrari	The Final Problem	2026	TV miniseries (Spanish)
Thomas Kaschel	The Death of Sherlock Holmes	2027	TV series (Swiss-German-Belgian)

== Theatrical films ==
Name	Title	Date	Type
Mr. Moyse	Silver Blaze	1912	Éclair short film series (British-French)
Mr. Moyse	The Beryl Coronet	1912	Éclair short film series (British-French)
Mr. Moyse	The Musgrave Ritual	1912	Éclair short film series (British-French)
Mr. Moyse	The Reigate Squares	1912	Éclair short film series (British-French)
Mr. Moyse	The Stolen Papers	1912	Éclair short film series (British-French)
Mr. Moyse	The Mystery of Boscombe Valley	1912	Éclair short film series (British-French)
Mr. Moyse	The Copper Beeches	1912	Éclair short film series (British-French)
Jack Francis	A Study in Scarlet	1914	Silent film (American)
Edward Fielding	Sherlock Holmes	1916	First silent film adaptation of the stage play (American)
Arthur M. Cullin	The Valley of Fear	1916	Silent film (British)
Arthur M. Cullin	The Sign of the Four	1923	Stoll film series (British)
Hubert Willis	45 short silent films	1921–1923	Stoll film series (British)
Hubert Willis	The Hound of the Baskervilles	1921	Stoll film series (British)
Roland Young	Sherlock Holmes	1922	Silent film adaptation of the stage play (American)
George Seroff	The Hound of the Baskervilles	1929	Silent film (German)
H. Reeves-Smith	The Return of Sherlock Holmes	1929	American film
Ian Fleming	The Sleeping Cardinal	1931	1931–1937 film series (British)
Ian Fleming	The Missing Rembrandt	1932	1931–1937 film series (British)
Ian Fleming	The Triumph of Sherlock Holmes	1935	1931–1937 film series (British)
Ian Fleming	Silver Blaze	1937	1931–1937 film series (British)
Athole Stewart	The Speckled Band	1931	British film
Ian Hunter	The Sign of Four	1932	1931–1937 film series (British)
Reginald Owen	Sherlock Holmes	1932	First sound adaptation of the stage play (American)
Frederick Lloyd	The Hound of the Baskervilles	1932	British film
Warburton Gamble	A Study in Scarlet	1933	American film
Fritz Odemar	The Hound of the Baskervilles	1937	German film
Heinz Rühmann	The Man Who Was Sherlock Holmes	1937	German film
Nigel Bruce	The Hound of the Baskervilles	1939	1939–1946 film series (USA)
Nigel Bruce	The Adventures of Sherlock Holmes	1939	1939–1946 film series (USA)
Nigel Bruce	Sherlock Holmes and the Voice of Terror	1942	1939–1946 film series (USA)
Nigel Bruce	Sherlock Holmes and the Secret Weapon	1943	1939–1946 film series (USA)
Nigel Bruce	Sherlock Holmes in Washington	1943	1939–1946 film series (USA)
Nigel Bruce	Sherlock Holmes Faces Death	1943	1939–1946 film series (USA)
Nigel Bruce	Crazy House (short cameo)	1943	1939–1946 film series (USA)
Nigel Bruce	The Spider Woman	1944	1939–1946 film series (USA)
Nigel Bruce	The Scarlet Claw	1944	1939–1946 film series (USA)
Nigel Bruce	The Pearl of Death	1944	1939–1946 film series (USA)
Nigel Bruce	The House of Fear	1945	1939–1946 film series (USA)
Nigel Bruce	The Woman in Green	1945	1939–1946 film series (USA)
Nigel Bruce	Pursuit to Algiers	1945	1939–1946 film series (USA)
Nigel Bruce	Terror by Night	1946	1939–1946 film series (USA)
Nigel Bruce	Dressed to Kill	1946	1939–1946 film series (USA)
Gautam Mukherjee	Jighansa	1951	Indian film
André Morell	The Hound of the Baskervilles	1959	British film
Thorley Walters	Sherlock Holmes and the Deadly Necklace	1962	West German-French-Italian film
Thorley Walters	The Best House in London	1969	British film
Thorley Walters	The Adventure of Sherlock Holmes' Smarter Brother	1975	American film
Donald Houston	A Study in Terror	1965	British film
Colin Blakely	The Private Life of Sherlock Holmes	1970	American film
Joanne Woodward	They Might Be Giants	1971	American film
Robert Duvall	The Seven-Per-Cent Solution	1976	American film
Dudley Moore	The Hound of the Baskervilles	1978	British film
James Mason	Murder by Decree	1979	British-Canadian film
Alan Cox	Young Sherlock Holmes	1985	American film
Michael Hordern	Young Sherlock Holmes	1985	American film (older version, voice only)
Laurie Main	The Great Mouse Detective	1986	American animated film; voice only
Ben Kingsley	Without a Clue	1988	American film
Gilbert Dacournan	Sherlock Holmes en Caracas	1992	Venezuelan film
Jude Law	Sherlock Holmes	2009	British-American films
Jude Law	Sherlock Holmes: A Game of Shadows	2011	British-American films
Colin Starkey	Mr. Holmes	2015	British-American film
Yoshimasa Hosoya / Jason Liebrecht	The Empire of Corpses	2015	Japanese film
John C. Reilly	Holmes & Watson	2018	American film
Himesh Patel	Enola Holmes 2	2022	British-American film
Himesh Patel	Enola Holmes 3	2026	British-American film
Jon C. Rich	Sherlock Holmes: Mare of the Night	2025	American film
Jon C. Rich	Sherlock Holmes: The Fall of Watson	TBA	American film
Stuart Forbes	Detective Chinatown 1900	2025	Chinese film
Tony Gerdes	Sherlock Holmes and the Angels of Vengeance	2025	American film
Ciaran Cresswell	Moriarty Rising: A Sherlock Holmes Tale	TBA	Italian production

== Video games ==
Name	Title	Date	Type
Warren Green	Sherlock Holmes: Consulting Detective	1991	Consulting Detective series; live-action cutscenes
Warren Green	Sherlock Holmes: Consulting Detective Vol. II	1992	Consulting Detective series; live-action cutscenes
Warren Green	Sherlock Holmes: Consulting Detective Vol. III	1993	Consulting Detective series; live-action cutscenes
Deem Bristow	The Lost Files of Sherlock Holmes: The Case of the Serrated Scalpel	1992	Voice role
Laurie Main	The Lost Files of Sherlock Holmes: The Case of the Serrated Scalpel	1994	Live-action video clips in the 3DO (1994) release
Roger L. Jackson	The Lost Files of Sherlock Holmes: The Case of the Rose Tattoo	1996	Voice role; digitized sprites based on a different actor
John Bell	Sherlock Holmes: The Mystery of the Mummy	2002	Sherlock Holmes series; voice role
David Riley	Sherlock Holmes: The Case of the Silver Earring	2004	Sherlock Holmes series; voice role
David Riley	Sherlock Holmes: The Awakened	2007	Sherlock Holmes series; voice role
David Riley	Sherlock Holmes Versus Arsène Lupin	2007	Sherlock Holmes series; voice role
David Riley	Sherlock Holmes Versus Jack the Ripper	2009	Sherlock Holmes series; voice role
David Riley	Sherlock Holmes and the Hound of the Baskervilles	2011	Sherlock Holmes series; voice role
David Riley	The Testament of Sherlock Holmes	2012	Sherlock Holmes series; voice role
Nick Brimble	Sherlock Holmes: Crimes & Punishments	2014	Sherlock Holmes series; voice role
Andrew Wincott	Sherlock Holmes: The Devil's Daughter	2016	Sherlock Holmes series; voice role
Andrew Wincott	Sherlock Holmes: The Awakened	2023	Sherlock Holmes series; voice role
Daniel Francis-Berenson	There Is No Game: Wrong Dimension	2020	Voice Role (English)
Daniel Francis-Berenson	Crushed in Time	2026	Voice Role (English)
Andrew James Spooner	The Beekeeper's Picnic	2025	Point-and-click adventure game; voice role

== Actors who have played both Sherlock Holmes and Dr. Watson ==
A small number of actors have played both Holmes and Watson, including Reginald Owen who played Watson in Sherlock Holmes (1932) and Holmes in A Study in Scarlet (1933); Jeremy Brett, who played Watson on stage in the United States prior to adopting the mantle of Holmes on British television; Howard Marion-Crawford, who played Holmes on British radio and Watson on American television; Carleton Hobbs, who played both roles in British radio adaptations; Patrick Macnee, who played both roles in US television movies.; and Anthony D.P. Mann who played Holmes in Sherlock Holmes and the Shadow Watchers (2011) and Watson in the 2017 Bleak December audio adaptation of The Hound of the Baskervilles.

== See also ==
- List of actors who have played Sherlock Holmes
- List of actors who have played Inspector Lestrade
- List of actors who have played Irene Adler
- List of actors who have played Mycroft Holmes
- List of actors who have played Mrs. Hudson
- List of actors who have played Professor Moriarty
