= List of actors who have played Mycroft Holmes =

The following is a list of actors who have played Mycroft Holmes in various media.

== Radio and audio dramas ==
Name	Title	Date	Type
Rex Evans	The New Adventures of Sherlock Holmes – "The Great Gandolfo", "The Tell-Tale Pigeon Feathers"	1945, 1946	Radio (Mutual)
Val Gielgud	The Adventures of Sherlock Holmes – "The Bruce-Partington Plans"	1954	BBC Light Programme
Malcolm Graeme	Sherlock Holmes – "The Bruce-Partington Plans", "The Final Problem"	1954, 1955	BBC Home Service
Keith Williams	Sherlock Holmes – "The Greek Interpreter"	1960	BBC Light Programme
Felix Felton	Sherlock Holmes – "The Bruce-Partington Plans"	1964	BBC Light Programme
John Hartley	BBC Radio Sherlock Holmes (3 stories)	1992–1995	BBC Radio 4
Philip Voss	The Seven-Per-Cent Solution	1993	BBC radio dramatisation of the novel
Frank Buxton	The Further Adventures of Sherlock Holmes (American series) – "The Secret of the Fives"	1998	Radio (Imagination Theatre)
Ted D'Arms	The Further Adventures of Sherlock Holmes (American series)	2000–2006	Radio (Imagination Theatre)
Ted D'Arms	Raffles, the Gentleman Thief – "An Affair of State"	2007	Radio (Imagination Theatre)
David Warner	"The Adventure of the Diogenes Damsel", "The Adventure of the Bloomsbury Bomber"	2008, 2015	Audio dramas (Big Finish)
Terry Edward Moore	The Classic Adventures of Sherlock Holmes – "The Greek Interpreter", "The Bruce-Partington Plans"	2010	Radio (Imagination Theatre)
Terry Edward Moore	The Further Adventures of Sherlock Holmes (American series)	2011–present	Radio (Imagination Theatre)
James Laurenson	The Further Adventures of Sherlock Holmes (British series) – "The Marlbourne Point Mystery" Parts 1–2	2010	BBC Radio 4
Timothy Bentinck	Sherlock Holmes	2014, 2018	Audio dramas (Big Finish)
Greg Page	Sherlock Holmes: The Voice of Treason	2020	Audio drama (Audible Original)
Thomas Mitchells	Sherlock & Co. – "The Greek Interpreter"	2026	Scripted podcast

== Television and DTV films ==
Name	Title	Date	Type
Boris Klyuyev	The Adventures of Sherlock Holmes and Dr. Watson	1980	Television films (USSR)
Boris Klyuyev	The Twentieth Century Approaches	1986	Television films (USSR)
Peter Jeffrey	Hands of a Murderer	1990	Television film (British)
Jerome Willis	Sherlock Holmes and the Leading Lady	1991	Television films
Jerome Willis	Incident at Victoria Falls	1992	Television films
R. H. Thomson	The Royal Scandal	2001	Television film (Canadian)
Richard E. Grant	Sherlock: Case of Evil	2002	Television film (American)
Nathan Wiley	Moriarty Rising: A Sherlock Holmes Tale	2027	Microdrama/feature film dual release (American-Italian)

== Television and streaming series ==
Name	Title	Date	Type
Derek Francis	Sherlock Holmes – "The Bruce-Partington Plans"	1965	TV episode (British)
Hans Cossy	Sherlock Holmes – "Die Bruce-Partington-Pläne"	1968	TV episode (German)
Ronald Adam	Sherlock Holmes – "The Greek Interpreter"	1968	TV episode (British)
Charles Gray	Sherlock Holmes	1985–1994	TV series (British)
Graeme Campbell	Alfred Hitchcock Presents – "My Dear Watson"	1989	TV episode (American)
Mark Gatiss	Sherlock	2010–2017	TV series (British)
Rhys Ifans	Elementary	2013–2014	TV series (American)
Igor Petrenko	Sherlock Holmes	2013	TV series (Russian)
Kōichi Yamadera	Sherlock Holmes	2014–2015	TV series (Japanese)
Yukiyoshi Ozawa	Miss Sherlock	2018	TV series (Japanese)
Katsunori Takahashi	Sherlock: Untold Stories	2019	TV series (Japanese)
Hiroki Yasumoto	Moriarty the Patriot	2020–2021	TV anime series (Japanese)
J. Michael Tatum	Moriarty the Patriot	2020–2021	TV anime series (Japanese) (English dub)
Jonjo O'Neill	The Irregulars – "Chapter Two: The Ghosts of 221B", "Chapter Three: Ipsissimus"	2021–2021	Netflix original series
Vincent Gale	Watson – "A Variant of Unknown Significance"	2025	TV series (American)
Max Irons	Young Sherlock	2026	Amazon Prime Video original series
Christian Koerner	The Death of Sherlock Holmes	2027	TV series (Swiss-German-Belgian)

== Theatrical films ==
Name	Title	Date	Type
Lewis Gilbert	The Bruce Partington Plans	1922	Stoll series silent film (British)
Robert Morley	A Study in Terror	1965	British film
Christopher Lee	The Private Life of Sherlock Holmes	1970	American film
Charles Gray	The Seven-Per-Cent Solution	1976	American film
Stephen Fry	Sherlock Holmes: A Game of Shadows	2011	British–American film
John Sessions	Mr. Holmes	2015	British–American film
Hugh Laurie	Holmes & Watson	2018	American film
Sam Claflin	Enola Holmes	2020	American-British film
Nathan Wiley	Moriarty Rising: A Sherlock Holmes Tale	TBA	Italian production

== Video games ==
Name	Title	Date	Type
Roger L. Jackson	The Lost Files of Sherlock Holmes: The Case of the Rose Tattoo	1996	Voice role; digitized sprites based on a different actor
Jon Severity	Sherlock Holmes: Crimes & Punishments	2014	Sherlock Holmes series; voice role
Phillipe Bosher	Sherlock Holmes Chapter One	2021	Sherlock Holmes series; voice role
Richard Rycroft	The Beekeeper's Picnic	2025	Voice role

== See also ==
- List of actors who have played Sherlock Holmes
- List of actors who have played Dr. Watson
- List of actors who have played Inspector Lestrade
- List of actors who have played Irene Adler
- List of actors who have played Mrs. Hudson
- List of actors who have played Professor Moriarty
