= The Hound of London =

- Based on: Characters by Arthur Conan Doyle
- Teleplay by: Craig Bowlsby
- Directed by: Peter Reynolds-Long
- Starring: Patrick Macnee
- Countries of origin: Luxembourg; Canada
- Original language: English

Production
- Producers: Craig Bowlsby; Peter Reynolds-Long
- Cinematography: Gil Letourneau
- Editor: Bridget Durnford

Original release
- Release: 1993

The Hound of London is a 1993 television film directed by Peter Reynolds-Long and starring Patrick Macnee as Arthur Conan Doyle's character Sherlock Holmes.

== Plot ==
At the request of Inspector Lestrade, Sherlock Holmes investigates a double murder at the Strand Theatre, with the assistance of Dr John Watson.

== Cast ==
- Patrick Macnee – Sherlock Holmes
- John Scott-Paget – Dr. Watson
- Colin Skinner – Inspector Lestrade
- Jack Macreath – Moriarty
- Craig Bowlsby – Lance Sterling
- Sophia Thornley – Mrs. Hudson
- Carolyn Wilkinson – Irene Norton
- Drew Kemp – Campbell
- Ned Lemley – Stonegrimble
- Ed Belanger – Striker
- Dale Kelly – Gadsby
- Rob Vanderbrink – King of Bohemia
- Colleen Bignell – Queen of Bohemia
- David Wood – The Body

== Production ==
The screenplay was derived from a play written by Craig Bowlsby and first performed in September 1987 in Burnaby, British Columbia. For the film version, it was entirely recast with the exception of Colleen Bignell who played Irene Norton in the play and the Queen of Bohemia in the film.

Patrick Macnee was cast as Sherlock Holmes. Previously, Macnee had portrayed Watson three times: once to Roger Moore's Sherlock Holmes in a 1976 TV movie, Sherlock Holmes in New York and twice with Christopher Lee (Incident at Victoria Falls and Sherlock Holmes and the Leading Lady). This film made Macnee one of only a small number of actors to have played both Sherlock Holmes and Dr. Watson. According to Allen Eyles, actors who played both roles include Reginald Owen (Watson in the 1932 film Sherlock Holmes, and then Holmes in 1933's A Study in Scarlet), Jeremy Brett (Watson on stage in The Crucifer of Blood and Holmes on television in The Adventures of Sherlock Holmes), Carleton Hobbs (who played both roles in British radio adaptations), and Howard Marion-Crawford (who played Holmes on radio and Watson on television). There are also other actors who played both roles such as H. Lawrence Leyton, who played both on stage.

== Reception ==
Author Alan Barnes claimed the film was "Cheap, nasty and painful to watch", and he described Macnee's Holmes as "a truly dreadful Holmes, wheezing out every line while resembling nothing less than an unshelled tortoise poured into a monkey suit."
