= Sherlock Holmes in New York =

1976 film by Boris Sagal

- DVD artwork
- Genre: Crime; Mystery
- Written by: Alvin Sapinsley
- Directed by: Boris Sagal
- Starring: Roger Moore; Patrick Macnee
- Music by: Richard Rodney Bennett
- Country of origin: United States
- Original language: English

Production
- Executive producer: Nancy Malone
- Producer: John Cutts
- Production location: New York City
- Cinematography: Michael D. Margulies
- Editor: Samuel E. Beetley
- Running time: 100 minutes
- Production company: 20th Century Fox Television

Original release
- Network: NBC
- Release: October 18, 1976

Sherlock Holmes in New York is a 1976 American made-for-television mystery film about Sherlock Holmes and Dr. John Watson, played by Roger Moore and Patrick Macnee respectively.

== Plot ==
The great detective Sherlock Holmes and his trusted companion Dr. John Watson travel to New York City to investigate a recent threat made by Professor James Moriarty.

During their investigation, Holmes and Watson are reunited with their old acquaintance Irene Adler, now a popular music-hall singer, who reveals that Moriarty has kidnapped her young son Scott. Moriarty has also left a note for Holmes informing him that he will be approached by the police soon for aid in a crime, and should he not refuse – Moriarty also informing him that he should provide no reason for his refusal – the boy will die.

Holmes is subsequently contacted by the NYPD regarding the recent apparent theft of the international gold exchange at the New York bank, with the entire vault of gold bars having vanished seemingly overnight, the theft only secret until a planned transaction between Italy and Germany in three days' time. To protect the child, Holmes refuses the case, but a chance comment by Watson inspires Holmes to shift his attention to finding Scott to remove the blackmail card. While Watson departs with Irene disguised as Holmes to draw away the agent Moriarty has assigned to watch him, Holmes determines that Scott was tricked into cooperating with the kidnapping as an apparent joke, allowing him to find the kidnapper.

Investigating the vaults, and quickly ruling as impossible the actual removal of many tonnes of gold via a narrow tunnel in the time available, Holmes swiftly determines what has taken place; based on the speed of the lift's descent, it should take them 45 seconds to reach the vaults, but they stopped after only 42 seconds. From this, Holmes deduces that Moriarty had an empty, duplicate vault built a few meters above the real one, subsequently planting iron bars to stop the lift reaching the real vault. While everyone puzzled over how the bars of gold were stolen from the false vault, Moriarty would actually be stealing them from the real one below. In a final confrontation in New York's underground, Moriarty escapes.

The case is solved. As Holmes and Adler say their goodbyes, Adler comments that her son has a keen intellect and a certain knack for solving puzzles, implying that Holmes may be his father. The two nevertheless part ways with Adler giving Holmes a picture of her son to keep.

== Cast ==
- Roger Moore as Sherlock Holmes
- Patrick Macnee as Doctor John Watson
- John Huston as Professor James Moriarty
- Charlotte Rampling as Irene Adler
- Gig Young as Mortimer McGrew
- David Huddleston as NYPD Inspector Lafferty
- Signe Hasso as Fraulein Reichenbach
- Leon Ames as Daniel Furman
- John Abbott as Heller
- Jackie Coogan as Haymarket Hotel Proprietor
- William Benedict as Telegraph Office Manager
- Paul Sorensen as Man In Checkered Suit
- John Steadman as Stage Doorman
- Geoffrey Moore as Scott Adler
- Charles Durning as Inspector (uncredited)

== Production ==
When initially approached to portray Sherlock Holmes, Roger Moore was uninterested. After reading the script, he decided to go ahead having found it "funny and original." He was attracted to how different the role was than other projects with which he had been involved.

But what I most like about playing Holmes is that there is more dialogue then I ever had in 120 Saint episodes and two Bond films.

Casting John Huston as Professor James Moriarty allowed for an homage to his classic film, The Maltese Falcon by having a reproduction of the film's jeweled Falcon on Moriarty's desk.

Patrick Macnee was cast as Dr. John Watson and played him in the same bumbling fashion as Nigel Bruce had decades earlier. Macnee went on to play a more intelligent representation of the character in two television films opposite Christopher Lee as Holmes, Sherlock Holmes and the Leading Lady and Incident at Victoria Falls. Moore's real-life son Geoffrey portrayed Scott Adler.

== Home media ==
=== Soundtrack ===
The film was scored by Richard Rodney Bennett, marking his first work for American television; Leonard Rosenman conducted. On 9 October 2006, Intrada Records released the music on a limited edition CD alongside Georges Delerue's score for The Pick-up Artist.

=== Video ===
On 22 August 2014, the film was released as a manufactured on demand DVD by 20th Century-Fox Cinema Archives.

On 25 July 2016, Signal One Entertainment released the movie on Blu-ray in the UK.
