= Whoopie Van Raam =

Dutch actress

- Born: Amsterdam, the Netherlands
- Education: Guildhall School of Music and Drama
- Occupation: Actress
- Years active: 2000-present

Whoopie Van Raam is a Dutch actress, known for her roles in Meg 2: The Trench, Watson and Counterpart.

== Early life and education ==
Van Raam was born in Amsterdam and grew up in The Netherlands and Spain. She studied classical Piano at the Conservatory in The Netherlands where she received a Bachelor of Music before moving to London to study acting at the prestigious Guildhall School of Music and Drama.

== Career ==
Van Raam’s career started in The Netherlands where she starred in series and feature films such as Spangas, Roes, Onderweg naar Morgen and Radeloos.

In 2017 she made her professional stage debut in Babette’s Feast, playing Young Martine, directed by Bill Buckhurst for The Coronet Theatre, London.

A year later she landed a recurring role in the Starz series Counterpart from creator Justin Marks playing opposite J.K. Simmons and Nazanin Boniadi. After a series of roles in various television series, such as Bulletproof, The Syndicate and FBI: International, she landed the role of Curtis playing alongside Jason Statham and Wu Jing in the film Meg 2: The Trench directed by Ben Wheatley.

In March 2025 it was announced Van Raam was cast as the classic character Irene Adler in the new CBS Sherlock Holmes spin-off series Watson.
