= Dorothea Macnee =

British socialite (1896–1984)

Dorothea Mabel Macnee BEM
- Dorothea Macnee in 1922
- Born: Dorothea Mabel Henry; 30 October 1896; Minehead, Somerset, England
- Died: 29 November 1984 (aged 88); Beckington, near Bath, Somerset, England
- Occupation: Socialite
- Spouse: Daniel Macnee (m. 1920; sep. 1929)
- Partner: Evelyn Spottiswoode (from 1929)
- Children: 2, including Patrick Macnee
- Relatives: Hans Francis Hastings, 12th Earl of Huntingdon (great-grandfather)

Dorothea Mabel Macnee, BEM (née Henry; 30 October 1896 – 29 November 1984), was a British socialite during the inter-war years. Her wide circle included many prominent people in entertainment and the arts, several of whom were introduced to her alternative lifestyle in the Berkshire house where she lived with her lesbian partner. After the Second World War, she was involved in the Women's Voluntary Service, receiving the British Empire Medal for her services. She had two sons, one of whom was Patrick Macnee, the actor.

== Family ==
Dorothea Macnee was the great-granddaughter of the 12th Earl of Huntingdon and granddaughter of Vice Admiral the Honourable George Fowler Hastings. Her parents, Dr Gordon George William Henry and Frances Alice Henry (née Hastings), were married on 4 November 1895. Dorothea was born on 30 October 1896 at Minehead in Somerset.

== Life ==
Dorothea married Daniel Macnee in June 1920. Daniel, eighteen years her senior, was a racehorse trainer and a grandson of the Scottish artist Sir Daniel Macnee. The couple initially lived near Marlborough, Wiltshire, where Patrick was born. In 1925 the family moved to College House in Lambourn, Berkshire.

Patrick later confirmed that it was an open marriage, during which Dorothea often spent extended periods in London, attending the theatre and fashionable parties. In December 1927 Dorothea gave birth to a second son, James, who lived for several years with his father, Oswald "Ozzie" Marmaduke Dalby Bell, who was also a horse trainer in Lambourn. Dorothea frequently visited to see her son.

During one of her stays in London, Dorothea met divorcee Mrs Evelyn Spottiswoode, a wealthy heiress of the Dewar's whisky company. A lesbian who preferred to dress in man-style tweed jackets and brogues, her Rooksnest House and estate were close to the Macnee home in Lambourn. In 1929 the Macnees separated when Daniel went to India to take up an appointment at the Bombay racecourse, while Dorothea and her son Patrick moved to live with Evelyn at Rooksnest. Although Daniel returned to live in College House in 1931, the Macnees never again lived together, although they maintained contact and never divorced.

At Rooksnest, Evelyn Spottiswoode and Dorothea Macnee lived with several other lesbians including Evelyn's former lover, a large household staff, and up to 45 dogs. Patrick was encouraged to address his mother's new partner as "uncle Evelyn", Evelyn paying for his schooling, first at Summer Fields and then at Eton.

During this time, visitors to Rooksnest included The Most Rev. Dr Francis Mostyn, Archbishop of Cardiff, who came to sanctify Rooksnest's chapel after Evelyn converted to Catholicism, the artist Augustus John and Rudyard Kipling, who while at Rooksnest supervised a short film based on his poem "His apologies" and in which one of Evelyn's dogs, a Scottish terrier named Penroath Drop o' Scotch appeared. Dorothea lived at Rooksnest for nineteen years, leaving shortly before Evelyn's death in August 1948 after disagreements between the two.

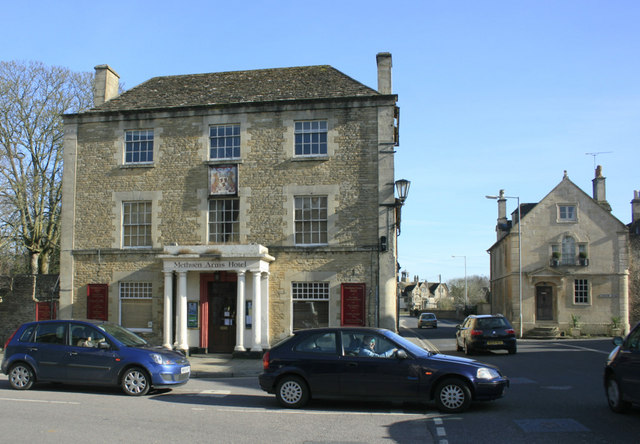
Methuen Arms Hotel, Corsham, where Macnee lived for twenty years until 1976

Although Dorothea inherited College House, Lambourn, on her husband's death in December 1952, her extravagant lifestyle meant that the property was soon mortgaged. She then lived in an army camp near Corsham, Wiltshire, in modest circumstances. Here, as a member of the Women's Voluntary Service, she worked unpaid for over ten years as a welfare officer for the families of British servicemen stationed overseas, telling one newspaper "Many [servicemen's wives] cry on my shoulder, it does them good, poor things". In recognition of this work she was awarded the British Empire Medal in the 1964 New Year Honours list. Shortly after this, she became a long-term resident at The Methuen Arms Hotel in Corsham, paid for by her son Patrick. Her friends at that time included Lord Methuen. She lived in the Methuen Arms until 1976 when growing health problems led to her move to a rest home.

In September 1984, her son Patrick was the subject of the television programme This Is Your Life. Patrick later confirmed that Dorothea was the

show's guest of honour ... Her mind was not what it was, but there was still the look of mischief about her. Tossing sticks and medics aside, Mama staggered onto the stage, where she was given a standing ovation. With great dignity, she inclined her head and acknowledged the nation. She'd no idea she was appearing on television. As the cheering continued and I clasped one of her hands in my own, I felt an enormous surge of pride. She really was a magnificent old girl.

Dorothea Macnee died on 29 November 1984, aged 88, at a nursing home in Beckington near Bath, Somerset.

== Sources ==
- Macnee, Patrick; Cameron, Marie (1988). Blind in One Ear. Harrap, London. ISBN 0-916515-58-3. Accessed 6 April 2020
