= Sherlock Holmes (1951 TV series) =

1951 mystery television series

- Also known as: We Present Alan Wheatley as Mr. Sherlock Holmes in...
- Based on: Sherlock Holmes stories by Arthur Conan Doyle
- Written by: C. A. Lejeune
- Starring: Alan Wheatley; Raymond Francis; Iris Vandeleur; Bill Owen
- No. of series: 1
- No. of episodes: 6 (all missing)

Production
- Producer: Ian Atkins
- Running time: 35 minutes

Original release
- Network: BBC Television Service
- Release: 20 October – 1 December 1951

Sherlock Holmes (also known as We Present Alan Wheatley as Mr. Sherlock Holmes in...) is a British mystery television series that was produced by the BBC featuring Alan Wheatley as Sherlock Holmes and Raymond Francis as Dr. Watson. This was the first series of Sherlock Holmes stories adapted for television.

All six episodes were adapted by C. A. Lejeune from the stories written by Arthur Conan Doyle. The series was broadcast live long before taping was an option. It is very unlikely that telerecordings of the live broadcasts were ever made, given the BBC didn't even attempt this method until 1953.

== Production ==
Some sources state that a BBC filmed adaptation of "The Adventure of the Mazarin Stone" (which aired on 29 July 1951) starring Andrew Osborn as Holmes and Philip King as Watson was a pilot episode for the series while others state the "Mazarin Stone" adaptation was a separate project entirely and was filmed for the Festival of Britain.

According to series star Alan Wheatley, the genesis of the series resided with a review of his performance in a television adaptation of Patrick Hamilton's Rope:

C A Lejeune gave me a marvellous notice in the Observer and she finished up by saying, "If the BBC have got any sense they will commission a series of Sherlock Holmes stories and ask Alan Wheatley to play Sherlock Holmes." So the BBC, very unlike them, took this up and wrote to her and said, "All right, if you will do the scripts we will do the series," and that's how they came to be done...

C. A. Lejeune did indeed pen the scripts, writing all six episodes. As quoted in a feature written for Radio Times, Lejeune said of the series, "we picked the stories that seemed likely to give a variety of subject, while rounding out the portrait of the man... We have tried, as loyally as we can, to preserve both the spirit and the high spirits of the original stories". Lejeune also said that "Holmes, and the Victorian world in which he mainly operated, will not be modernised in this series".

Each 35-minute episode was aired live and consequently no tapes exist of the series to date. Live television had its pitfalls, of which Wheatley later complained:

I must say I found it the most difficult thing to speak I've ever done in the whole of my career. Unfortunately, Miss Lejeune also did some things that are just not possible—technical things like not allowing enough time for changes. You see, television was live in those days, and in one particular scene she finished up with a sentence from me, and opened the next scene also with a sentence from me, in heavy disguise, with no time at all for a change!

In multiple episodes, Iris Vandeleur played Mrs. Hudson and Bill Owen played Inspector Lestrade. Eric Maturin appeared as Colonel Moran in one episode, and Olga Edwardes portrayed Irene Adler in another episode.

Each episode was introduced by Nona Liddell's rendition of Offenbach's "Barcarolle". Generally, a few very short and usually silent film sequences would be shot the day before the broadcast, such as shots of Holmes and Watson in a cab. The stage manager Cecil Petty and assistant stage manager Pamela Barnard had minor acting roles in most episodes.

== Cast ==
- Alan Wheatley as Sherlock Holmes (6 episodes)
- Raymond Francis as Dr. Watson (6 episodes)
- Iris Vandeleur as Mrs. Hudson (5 episodes)
- Bill Owen as Inspector Lestrade (4 episodes)
- Donald Kemp performed multiple roles in 3 episodes
- Pamela Barnard performed multiple roles in 3 episodes
- Sebastian Cabot as Jabez Wilson (1 episode)
- Alan Judd as King of Bohemia (1 episode)
- Stanley Van Beers as Inspector Forrester (1 episode)
- Olga Edwardes as Irene Adler (1 episode)
- Alvys Maben as Lady Hilda Trelawney Hope (1 episode)
- Eric Maturin as Colonel Moran (1 episode)
- Henry Oscar as Mr. Culverton Smith (1 episode)
- Martin Starkie as Vincent Spaulding (1 episode)
- H.G. Stoker as Colonel Hayter (1 episode)
- Larry Burns as Duncan Ross (1 episode)
- Clement Hamelin as Tall thin man (1 episode)
- Thomas Heathcote as Alec Cunningham (1 episode)
- John Robinson as Mr. Trelawney Hope (1 episode)
- John Stevens as Godfrey Norton (1 episode)
- Beckett Bould as Mr. Cunningham (1 episode)
- Arthur Goullet as Mr. Merryweather (1 episode)
- John Le Mesurier as Eduardo Lucas (1 episode)
- Michael Raghan as Old cabby (1 episode)
- J. Leslie Frith as The Premier (1 episode)
- Victor Platt as PC Perkins (1 episode)
- Nicholas Tannar as Hopeful applicant (1 episode)
- Iris Williams as 2nd Nursemaid (1 episode)
- Clarence Bigge as Butler (1 episode)
- Christopher Hodge as Rejected applicant (1 episode)
- Sam Kydd as Unimpressed onlooker (1 episode)
- Betty Turner as Housekeeper (1 episode)
- Tony Burton as 1st Errand boy (1 episode)
- Gordon Phillott as Mr. Acton (1 episode)
- Meadows White as Ostler (1 episode)
- Vernon Gibb as Ostler (1 episode)
- Eddie Sutch as 2nd Errand boy (1 episode)
- John Vere as Butler (1 episode)
- John Fitzgerald as Ostler (1 episode)
- Max Barrett (1 episode)
- John Boddington (1 episode)
- Geoffrey Chater (1 episode)
- Eric Dodson (1 episode)
- Alexis Milne (1 episode)
- Florence Viner (1 episode)
- Edmond Warwick (1 episode)

== Episodes ==
No.	Title	Based on	Original release date
1	"The Empty House"	"The Adventure of the Empty House"	20 October 1951
Dr. Watson assists in the investigation of the murder of Ronald Frances Adair and is shocked by the unexpected return of the presumed dead Sherlock Holmes. Together they nab the last remaining henchman of Sherlock's archenemy Moriarty.
2	"A Scandal in Bohemia"	"A Scandal in Bohemia"	27 October 1951
Holmes is contacted by the King of Bohemia. The monarch wants Holmes to search for a photo in Irene Adler's possession which she can use to blackmail him. Despite Holmes's best efforts, Irene Adler is always one step ahead of him.
3	"The Dying Detective"	"The Adventure of the Dying Detective"	3 November 1951
Adelaide Savage requests Holmes and Watson investigate her husband Victor. Victor Savage is addicted to opium and influenced by his wicked cousin Culverton Smith, who is intent on taking over the Savage family fortune.
4	"The Reigate Squires"	"The Adventure of the Reigate Squire"	17 November 1951
Holmes investigates a case involving father and son Mr. Cunningham and Alec Cunningham.
5	"The Red-Headed League"	"The Red-Headed League"	24 November 1951
Holmes and Watson investigate an odd vacancy Mr. Wilson applied for and lost two months later. Holmes finds that this was just to get Mr. Wilson out of the way in preparation for a bank robbery.
6	"The Second Stain"	"The Adventure of the Second Stain"	1 December 1951
Sherlock Holmes is assigned to search for a top-secret document, without arousing suspicion from the public. After days of investigating, Holmes finds the thief was blackmailed into taking it.

== Reception ==
The 23 October 1951 issue of The Times said "The performance was done in a proper spirit of seriousness. Mr. Alan Wheatley, though rather younger and fuller in the face than the Holmes of his opponents' nightmares, yet catches the essential character."
