= Morrison v. White =

Freedom suit filed in 1857 in Louisiana

Morrison v. White was a freedom suit first filed in Louisiana's Third District Court in October 1857 by 15-year-old Jane (or Alexina) Morrison, a runaway slave, against her purchaser, New Orleans slave trader James White. Morrison, who had "a fair complexion, blue eyes, and flaxen hair", claimed to be white.

In 1857, Morrison was sold by J. G. Haliburton or J. A. Halliburton of Arkansas to longtime New Orleans slave trader James White. She soon ran away and, in October of that year, petitioned the Third District Court in Jefferson Parish (where White resided) to be declared legally free. She claimed she was born to white parents and that her first name was Alexina, not Jane. Further, she asked for $10,000 in damages. She also asked to be placed under the protection of William Dennison, the parish's jailer, and that she be kept in jail to avoid being seized by White. She remained in jail for all but 19 months over the next five years, giving birth to a girl while incarcerated.

The case went to trial three times. White provided depositions asserting that a Moses Morrison of Matagorda County, Texas, had purchased her, her siblings, and their mother in 1848 for four or five years before giving her to his nephew in Arkansas. The nephew then allegedly gave her to a slave trader to sell in New Orleans. The defense also produced a bill of sale, which did not constitute legal proof in Louisiana as it was not notarized. The 1850 census listed a seven-year-old female mulatto slave residing in Matagorda County with her family. The plaintiff's lawyers were unable to provide any corroborating evidence of their own but asserted Morrison was white because she looked and behaved like a white woman.

The first trial ended in a mistrial. The jury in the second, held in May 1859 in the Fifth District Court, voted unanimously in Morrison's favor. The third trial was held in New Orleans. That jury, unable to reach a unanimous decision, was permitted, with Morrison's consent, to reach a majority verdict (10–2 for her) in January 1862. White's lawyers appealed again, but a fourth trial never took place (the U.S. Army regained control of New Orleans in the American Civil War), and with the eventual U.S. victory came the end of slavery in the United States.

Nothing is known about the later life of Morrison or her daughter Mary.
