= Moriarty (podcast) =

Fictional podcast

- Cover art for the first season
- Genre: Mystery
- Language: English

Creative team
- Created by: Charles Kindinger
- Written by: Charles Kindinger

Cast and voices
- Starring: Dominic Monaghan; Phil LaMarr
- Voices: Dominic Monaghan; Billy Boyd; Phil LaMarr; Helen Mirren; Ben Kingsley

Production
- Production: Treefort Media

Publication
- No. of seasons: 3
- No. of episodes: 30
- Original release: July 7, 2022 – April 30, 2026
- Provider: Audible

Related
- Website: www.audible.com/pd/Moriarty-Podcast/B0B2DZBVRR

Moriarty is a mystery drama podcast written by creator and executive producer Charles Kindinger, and produced by Treefort Media and Audible. Based on the works of Arthur Conan Doyle, the drama stars Dominic Monaghan as Professor James Moriarty and Phil LaMarr as Sherlock Holmes.

The 10-episode first season, entitled The Devil's Game, was released July 7, 2022. The second season, entitled The Silent Order was released on November 9, 2023, with Helen Mirren and Anya Chalotra joining the cast. The third and final season, The Great Chaos, released on April 30, 2026, with Ben Kingsley playing Moriarty's father.

A German language version was released in November 2024.

== Plot ==
Moriarty: The Devils Game offers a different take on the familiar story of Sherlock Holmes, asking "What if Holmes' most villainous nemesis was actually an innocent man?" The podcast recasts Professor James Moriarty as a desperate fugitive framed for murder.

== Cast ==
- Dominic Monaghan as Professor James Moriarty
- Phil LaMarr as Sherlock Holmes
- Billy Boyd (Series 1) and Ross McCall (Series 2-3) as Colonel Sebastian Moran
- Lindsay Whisler (Series 1) and Arielle Goldman (Series 2) as Rose Winslow
- Victoria Smurfit (Series 1) and Lindsay Jean Michelle (Series 2-3) as Madame Charlotte
- Adam Godley as Doctor John Watson (Series 1 and 3)

=== The Devil's Game ===
- Curtis Armstrong as Chief Inspector Gregson
- Josh Robert Thompson as Inspector Lestrade
- Carlo Rota as John Clay
- Billy Harris as JJ Moriarty
- Rebecca Mader as Mary Watson
- Aaron Lyons as Bellman
- Lindsay Jean Michelle as additional voices

=== The Silent Order ===
- Helen Mirren as Lady Milverton
- Anya Chalotra as Agatha
- Curtis Armstrong as Boss Duffy
- Dan Domingues as Eduardo Lucas
- Billy Harris as Constable McPherson, JJ Moriarty
- Lindsay Jean Michelle as Mrs. Hudson/Charlotte
- Josh Robert Thompson as Fred
- Paul Rogan as Horace

=== The Great Chaos ===
- Ben Kingsley as Moriarty's father
- Joanne Froggatt as Violet
- Billy Harris as Billy
- Josh Robert Thompson as Baron Gruner
- Nicholas Mongiardo-Cooper as Von Bork
- JB Blanc as Professor Farley
- Lindsay Jean Michelle as Charlotte, Isadora Klein, Isabella Moriarty
- Ken Clement as Archie
- Paul Rogan as various
- Kai Edgar as young Moriarty
- Dan Domingues as President Murillo
- Pranshu Mishra as various
- Sara Matsui-Colby as various

== Episodes ==
=== The Devil's Game ===
No.	Title	Original air date	Synopsis
1	"Chapter One"	July 7, 2022	Mathematical genius and esteemed professor James Moriarty’s world shatters when his fiancée, Rose Winslow, is mysteriously murdered. Unjustly accused of the crime, Moriarty pins his hopes on the one man who can help him solve the case: the great Sherlock Holmes.
2	"Chapter Two"	July 7, 2022	Facing the noose for a crime he didn’t commit, Moriarty must use his wits to prove his innocence to the courts. Reasonable doubt is on his side – but James’ new cellmate, Colonel Sebastian Moran, is not convinced it will save his neck.
3	"Chapter Three"	July 7, 2022	Pulled into a daring prison escape by a gang of criminals, Moriarty battles the morality of his decisions while on the run with Moran. Meanwhile, Scotland Yard fumbles to find the fugitives until Sherlock Holmes arrives to commandeer the manhunt.
4	"Chapter Four"	July 7, 2022	Vowing to find Rose’s killer, Moriarty follows Moran into the London underworld to calculate his next move. Meanwhile, Holmes recruits his former partner, Doctor John H. Watson, out of a peaceful retirement.
5	"Chapter Five"	July 7, 2022	Moriarty tugs on the threads of a chilling plot against him. And as “the game” that killed Rose comes into clearer focus, he enlists unlikely allies to confirm his devilish deductions.
6	"Chapter Six"	July 7, 2022	Moriarty’s quest for justice takes a darker turn as he declares war against the Crown. But acquiring the resources for vengeance forces him further into the criminal underworld…just as Sherlock’s closing in on him.
7	"Chapter Seven"	July 7, 2022	Now at the helm of a criminal empire, Moriarty searches for the shadowy figure who engineered the conspiracy against him. But in the hunt for this puppet master, Moriarty confronts the unthinkable – and must further compromise his troubled soul.
8	"Chapter Eight"	July 7, 2022	Armed with the name of the man behind Rose’s death, Moriarty emerges from the safety of the shadows to execute a deadly plot for revenge.
9	"Chapter Nine"	July 7, 2022	After barely surviving a dangerous mission into the Diogenes Club, Moriarty prepares to leave London in search of the mysterious agent who killed Rose. Meanwhile, Sherlock reunites with Watson and devises a new plan to lure Moriarty into his grasp.
10	"Chapter Ten"	July 7, 2022	Moriarty escapes London, questioning everything he thought to be true. With Sherlock and Watson hot on his tail, he heads to the Continent with Moran to end the chaos once and for all.
