= Sherlock Holmes and the Baker Street Irregulars =

- Written by: Richard Kurti; Bev Doyle
- Directed by: Julian Kemp
- Starring: Jonathan Pryce; Bill Paterson; Michael Maloney; Mia Fernandez; Aaron Johnson; Megan Jones
- Music by: Debbie Wiseman
- Country of origin: United Kingdom
- Original language: English

Production
- Producer: Andy Rowley
- Cinematography: Ciarán Tanham
- Running time: 114 minutes
- Production company: RDF Television

Original release
- Release: 25 March 2007

Sherlock Holmes and the Baker Street Irregulars is a 2007 BBC television drama about Sherlock Holmes and the Baker Street Irregulars, a gang of children who would occasionally help him. It stars Jonathan Pryce as Sherlock Holmes and Bill Paterson as Dr Watson with Anna Chancellor and Aaron Johnson. It was possibly a two-part pilot episode because of the theme song at the beginning of both parts and credits at the end of the second, for a TV show that never came to fruition. A tease at the end is also present, but a followup has not been produced in any form.

== Plot ==
The Baker Street Irregulars investigate as several of their members go missing, while also trying to prevent Sherlock Holmes – who is undergoing a personal crisis – being convicted of murder.

== Cast ==
- Jonathan Pryce as Sherlock Holmes
- Bill Paterson as Dr Watson
- Anna Chancellor as Irene Adler
- Michael Maloney as Inspector Stirling
- Aaron Taylor-Johnson as Finch
- Ben Smith as Jack
- Frank Murray as Mallory
- Mia Fernandez as Sadie
- Megan Jones as Jasmine
- Alice Hewkin as Tealeaf
- Brendan Patricks as Inspector Burrows

== Production ==
It was shot and post produced in Dublin, Ireland.

== Reception ==
Ray Bennett of The Hollywood Reporter praised the film.
