= Jerome Willis =

British stage and screen actor (1928–2014)

- Willis as Edward Pengelley in Poirot (1990)
- Born: Jerome Barry Willis; 23 October 1928; Balham, London, England
- Died: 11 January 2014 (aged 85); Wimbledon, London, England
- Education: Old Vic Theatre School
- Occupations: Actor, news reader, disc jockey
- Height: 180 cm (5 ft 11 in)
- Spouse: Dilys Elstone (m. 1952)

Jerome Barry Willis (23 October 1928 – 11 January 2014) was a British stage and screen actor, with a strong reputation for Shakespearean roles in the theatre.

Willis had a leading role in the ITV drama series The Sandbaggers as Matthew Peele. He also appeared in Z-Cars as DCS Richards, Within These Walls as Charles Radley, and Doctor Who as corporate polluter Stevens in The Green Death. He played Praetorian Guard commander Macro in the ITV Roman series The Caesars. His other television appearances include the cult children's television series Freewheelers as the manic Professor Nero, and the science fiction police drama Space Precinct as Captain Podley.

In 2002 Willis appeared with the Royal Shakespeare Company, in Pericles at the Roundhouse in London.

His film credits included Siege of the Saxons (1963), A Jolly Bad Fellow (1964), Khartoum (1966), The Magus (1968), Doomwatch (1972), Yellow Dog (1973), Winstanley (1975), Lifeforce (1985), God's Outlaw (1986), Sherlock Holmes and the Leading Lady (1991), Incident at Victoria Falls (1992) and Orlando (1992).

== Early career ==
Jerome Willis started his career as a newsreader, disc jockey and actor when he was posted to Ceylon, now Sri Lanka, in 1946 as a part of his national service in the Royal Air Force. He served in communications for the Ceylonese station Radio SEAC.

Upon his return to London in 1948, he was accepted as a student at the Old Vic Theatre School, run by Michel Saint-Denis. Fellow students included Joan Plowright and Prunella Scales. Upon graduating in 1951, he joined the West of England Touring Company, alongside fellow student Plowright.

== Filmography ==
Year	Title	Role	Notes
1956	Abigail and Roger		4 episodes
1960	Foxhole in Cairo	1st British Signals Sergeant	
1963	Siege of the Saxons	The Limping Man	
1964	A Jolly Bad Fellow	Detective Inspector Armstrong	
1966	Khartoum	Frank Power	Uncredited
1968	The Magus	'False' German Officer	
1972	Doomwatch	Lt. Com. Tavener	
1973	Yellow Dog	Hawk Curtis	
1975	Winstanley	General Lord Fairfax	
1985	Lifeforce	Pathologist	
1986	God's Outlaw	Bishop Stokesley	
1991	Sherlock Holmes and the Leading Lady	Mycroft Holmes	
1992	Incident at Victoria Falls	Mycroft Holmes	
1992	Orlando	Translator	
1994	A Business Affair	Moderator	
1998	The Sea Change	Older Board Member	
2006	Perfume: The Story of a Murderer	Councillor 1	
