= Irene Adler =

Fictional character created by Arthur Conan Doyle

- Sherlock Holmes character
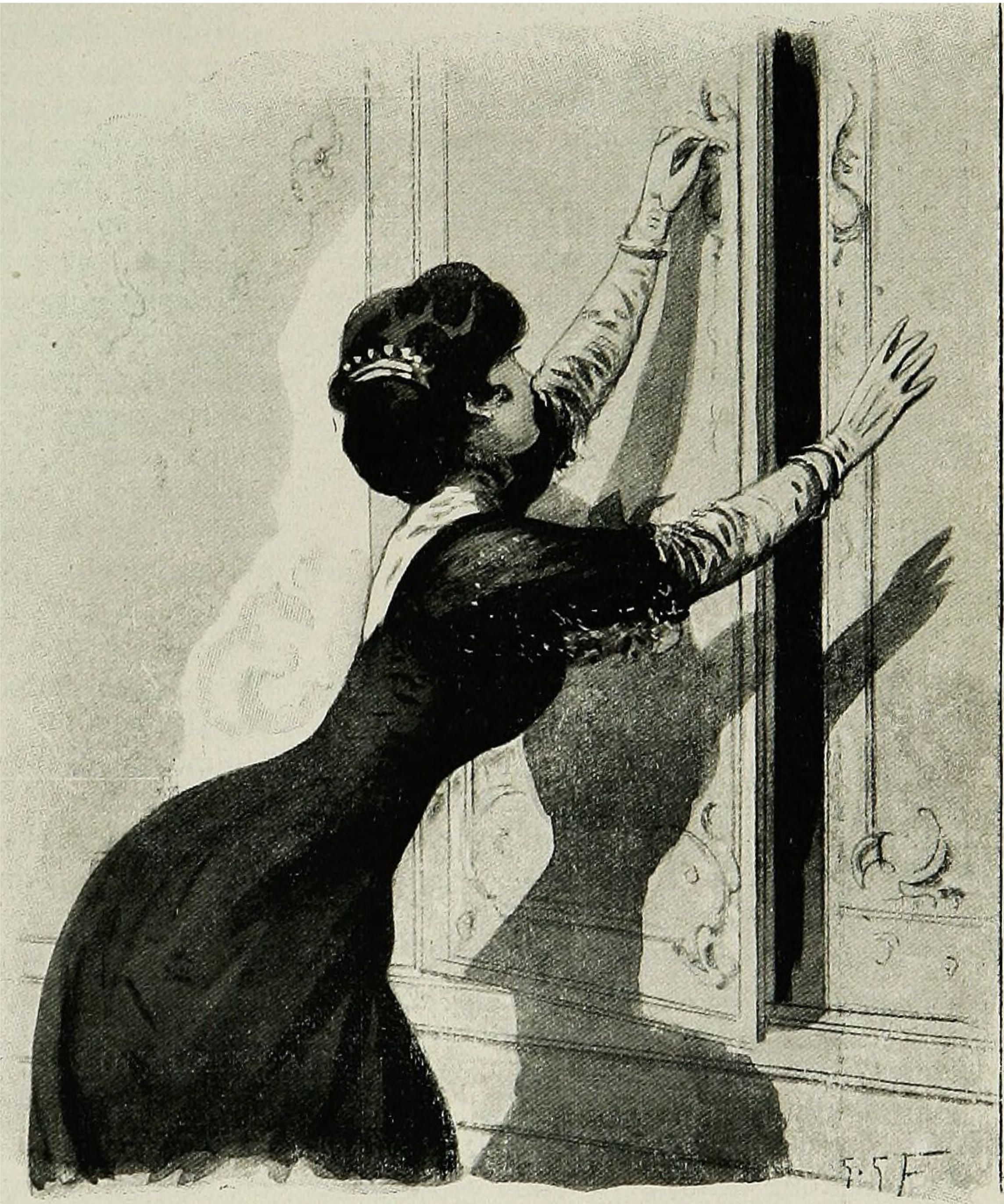
- Illustration by Gaston Simoes de Fonseca, 1913
- First appearance: "A Scandal in Bohemia" (1891)
- Created by: Sir Arthur Conan Doyle

In-universe information
- Gender: Female
- Occupation: Opera singer
- Spouse: Godfrey Norton
- Nationality: British/American

Irene Adler is a fictional character in the Sherlock Holmes stories written by Sir Arthur Conan Doyle. A former opera singer and actress, she was featured in the short story "A Scandal in Bohemia", published in July 1891. Adler is one of the most notable female characters in the Sherlock Holmes series, despite appearing in only one story. While not technically a criminal and bearing no malice towards Holmes, she outsmarts him and evades his traps. Sherlock Holmes refers to her afterwards respectfully as "the Woman".

Despite her brief appearance in the canon, Adler persists in many adaptations of Sherlock Holmes. While in the original, Watson notes Holmes has no romantic interest in Adler or in women in general, pointing out the detective only exhibits a platonic admiration for her wit and cunning, some derivative works reinterpret Adler as a romantic interest for Holmes or as a former lover who later engages in crime. Retrospectively, the original story is viewed as a more progressive and feminist interpretation of Adler. From the television shows Sherlock and Elementary to the film Sherlock Holmes, each portrayal depicts several notable qualities Adler possesses, such as her independence, adaptability, and intelligence; but a common issue pointed out with each portrayal is the attempts to mesh these qualities with seduction and manipulation.

== Fictional character biography ==
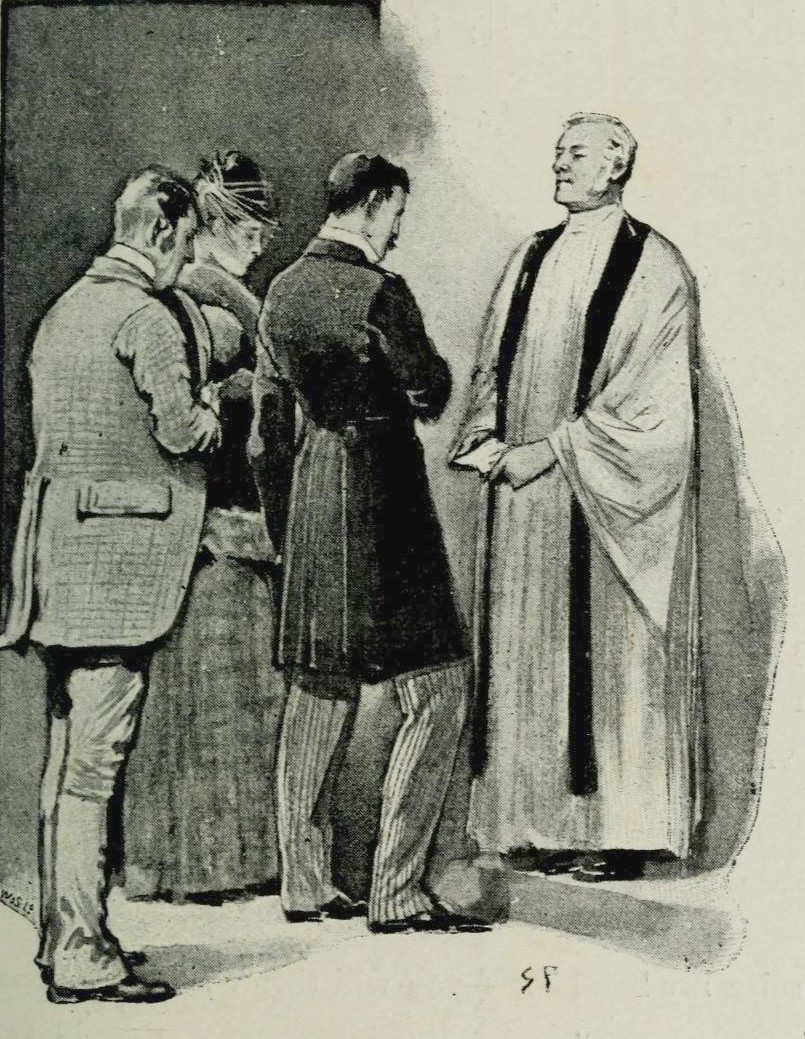
Holmes (in disguise) at the wedding of Irene Adler and Godfrey Norton, 1891 illustration by Sidney Paget

Adler appears only in "A Scandal in Bohemia". Her name is briefly mentioned in "A Case of Identity", "The Adventure of the Blue Carbuncle", and "His Last Bow".

According to Doyle's "A Scandal in Bohemia", Adler was born in New Jersey in 1858. She had a career in opera as a contralto, performing at La Scala in Milan, Italy, and a term as prima donna in the Imperial Opera of Warsaw, Poland. In Poland, she became the lover of Wilhelm Gottsreich Sigismond von Ormstein, Grand Duke of Cassel-Felstein and King of Bohemia. The King describes her as "a well-known adventuress" (a term widely used at the time in ambiguous association with "courtesan") who has "the face of the most beautiful of women and the mind of the most resolute of men".

Five years after their secret romance, it has been arranged for the King to marry Clotilde Lothman von Saxe-Meiningen, a young Scandinavian princess. However, he fears her conservative family would call off the wedding if any evidence of his former liaison with Adler were ever revealed to them. He fears she may attempt to blackmail him with a photograph of the two.

The events of the story unfold when the King seeks out Holmes' skills to retrieve the photograph from Adler after multiple attempts have proved fruitless. In pursuit of information about Adler, Holmes witnesses her marry Godfrey Norton in secret. Despite this, Sherlock still tries to retrieve the photograph. However, Adler, aware of his plan, flees the country before they can catch her. Holmes has been outwitted.

His perspective on the investigation changes when Holmes realizes that he has been on the wrong side of the affair all along. In a handwritten letter addressed to him, Adler reveals that she has hidden the photograph simply for the purpose of protecting herself against the monarch's wrath. She writes, "As to the photograph, your client may rest in peace. I love and am loved by a better man than he. The King may do what he will without hindrance from one whom he has cruelly wronged."

Holmes, who "used to make merry over the cleverness of women", requests a photograph of Adler in lieu of an emerald ring from the King and leaves, "without observing the hand which the King had stretched out to him". He keeps her photograph locked up as a reminder of his respect for her intellectual prowess.

== Possible real-life inspirations ==
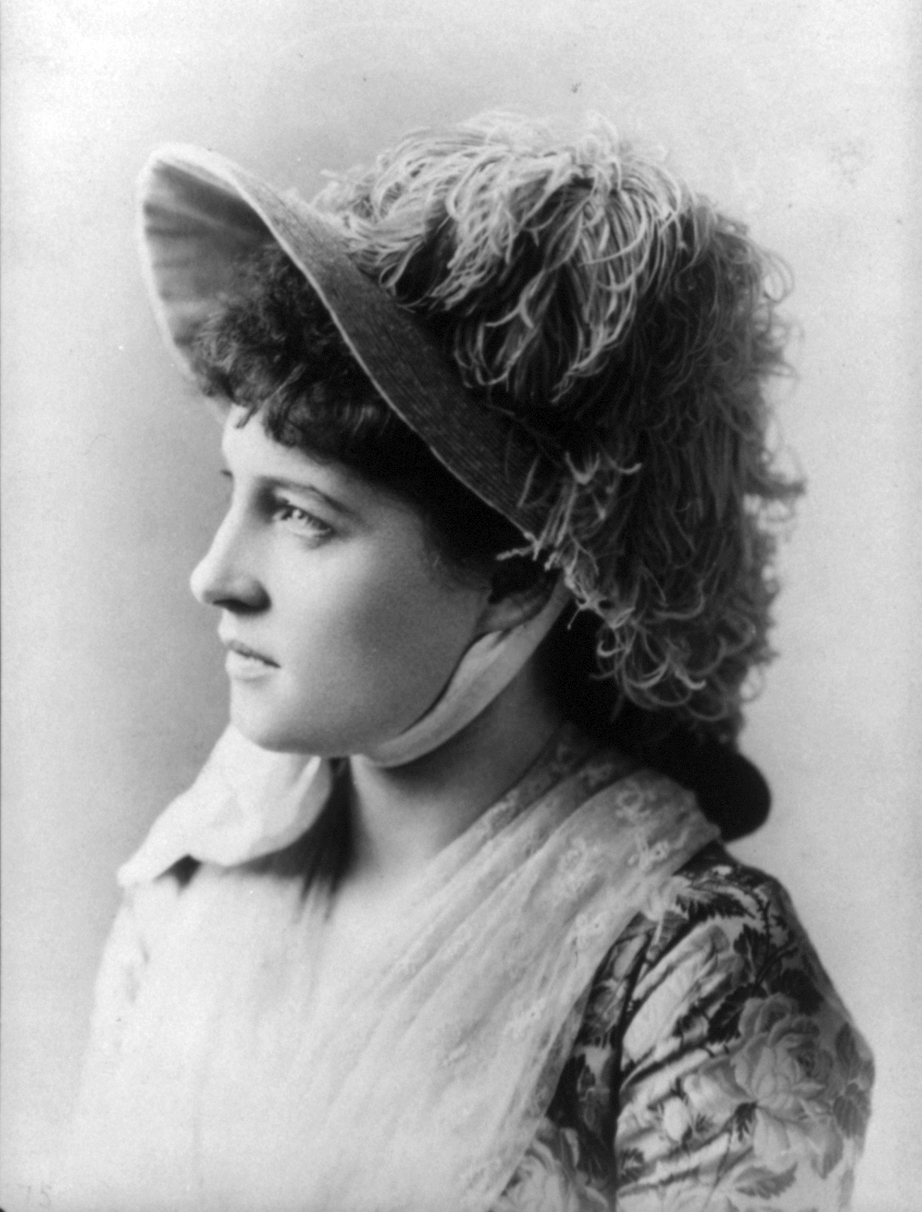
Lillie Langtry (circa 1882), possible model for Adler

Adler's career as a theatrical performer who becomes the lover of a powerful aristocrat had several precedents. One is Lola Montez, a dancer who became the lover of Ludwig I of Bavaria and influenced national politics. Montez is suggested as a model for Adler by several writers.

Another possibility is the actor Lillie Langtry, the lover of Edward, the Prince of Wales. Writing in 1957, Julian Wolff, a member of the literary society The Baker Street Irregulars, comments that it was well known that Langtry was born in Jersey (she was called the "Jersey Lily") and Adler is born in New Jersey. Langtry had later had several other aristocratic lovers, and her relationships had been speculated upon in the public press in the years before Doyle's story was published.

Another suggestion is the dancer Ludmilla Stubel, the alleged lover and later wife of Archduke Johann Salvator of Austria.

== Analysis of Adler in "A Scandal in Bohemia" ==
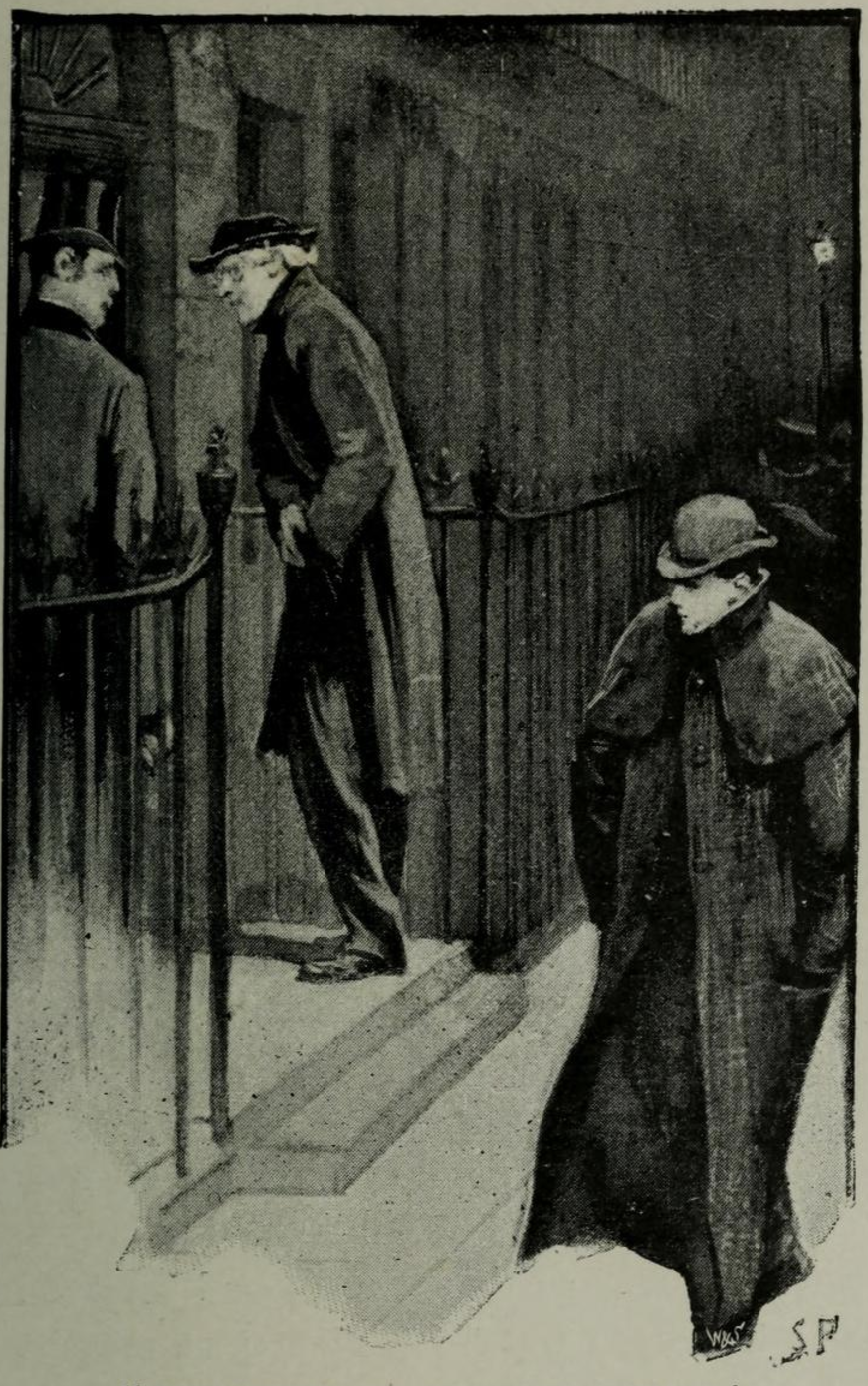
Adler, in disguise, walks past Holmes and Watson as the two enter Holmes' residence, 1891 illustration by Sidney Paget.

Adler is a unique character within the Holmes stories. While most women in the canon are either victims, objects of desire, or in need of the detective's help, Adler has a large amount of agency in the story. Unlike Holmes' other female adversaries, Adler is not explicitly a criminal nor does she need Holmes' help; she only acts to protect herself. Adler is also unique because she outsmarts Holmes – Holmes remarks in "The Five Orange Pips" that he has been beaten just four times: "three times by men, and once by a woman", that woman is believed by some to be Adler.

Due to her intelligence Adler earns Holmes's unbounded admiration, but he is not romantically attracted to her. When the King of Bohemia says, "Would she not have made an admirable queen? Is it not a pity she was not on my level?" Holmes dryly replies that Adler is indeed on a much different level from the King. The beginning of "A Scandal in Bohemia" describes the high regard in which Holmes held Adler:

To Sherlock Holmes she is always the woman. I have seldom heard him mention her under any other name. In his eyes she eclipses and predominates the whole of her sex. It was not that he felt any emotion akin to love for Irene Adler. All emotions, and that one particularly, were abhorrent to his cold, precise but admirably balanced mind. [...] And yet there was but one woman to him, and that woman was the late Irene Adler, of dubious and questionable memory.

Analysis of "A Scandal in Bohemia" has also focused on how Adler diverges from Victorian social standards for women. She is unmarried at the beginning of the story, in opposition to "the importance that the middle classes placed on the family unit" at the time. Adler further defies gender norms by cross-dressing, donning male clothes with great comfort as demonstrated by her reference to them as her "walking-clothes". Several authors have argued that Adler's nonconformity is what leads to her victory over Holmes, as he makes deductions based on societal norms that she does not adhere to. Holmes underestimates her ability to detect his ulterior motives when he enters her home, then the detective is unable to recognize the cross-dressing Adler, and so does not know she is aware of his plot. This gives her time to abscond with the all-important photograph, triumphing over Holmes.

== Portrayals of Adler in derivative works ==
In derivative works, she is frequently used as a romantic interest for Holmes, a departure from Doyle's story where he only admired her for her wit and cunning. In his Sherlock Holmes Handbook, Christopher Redmond writes "the Canon provides little basis for either sentimental or prurient speculation about a Holmes–Adler connection".

=== Books ===
In his fictional biographies Sherlock Holmes of Baker Street (1962) and Nero Wolfe of West Thirty-fifth Street (1969), William S. Baring-Gould puts forth an argument that Adler and Holmes meet again after the latter's supposed death at Reichenbach Falls. They perform on stage together incognito, and become lovers. According to Baring-Gould, Holmes and Adler's union produces one son, Nero Wolfe, who would follow in his father's footsteps as a detective.

In two novels by John Lescroart published in 1986 and 1987, it is stated that Adler and Holmes had a son, Auguste Lupa, and it is implied that he later changes his name to Nero Wolfe.

A series of mystery novels written by Carole Nelson Douglas (1990–2004) features Adler as the protagonist and sleuth, chronicling her life shortly before (in the novel Good Night, Mr. Holmes) and after her notable encounter with Sherlock Holmes in "A Scandal in Bohemia", in which the series features Holmes as a supporting character. The series continues with Adler's other adventures in numerous locations around the world, showcasing her cunning and brilliance. Compared with later adaptations, Douglas's mysteries have been praised for not "rel[ying] on Adler's sexuality or appearance". Douglas provides Adler with a back story as a child vaudeville performer who was trained as an opera singer before going to work as a Pinkerton detective. In the books, Douglas strongly implies that Irene's mother was Lola Montez and her father possibly Ludwig I of Bavaria. The series includes Godfrey Norton as Irene's supportive barrister husband; Penelope "Nell" Huxleigh, a vicar's daughter and former governess who is Irene's best friend and biographer; and Nell's love interest Quentin Stanhope. Historical characters such as Oscar Wilde, Bram Stoker, Alva Vanderbilt and Consuelo Vanderbilt, and journalist Nellie Bly, among others, also make appearances.

The young adult Italian series Sherlock, Lupin and Me, by Alessandro Gatti under the pen name Irene Adler, is a twenty two book saga about the adventures a young Adler has with a young Sherlock Holmes and Arsène Lupin, the first four volumes were translated to English and the others to multiple languages including Spanish, French and Portuguese.

Adler appears as an opera singer in the 1993 pastiche The Canary Trainer, where she encounters Holmes during his three-year 'death' while he is working as a violinist in the Paris Opera House, and asks him to help her protect her friend and unofficial protégé, Christine Daaé, from the 'Opera Ghost'.

In the 2009 novel The Language of Bees by Laurie R. King, it is stated Adler is deceased when the book takes place and once had an affair with Sherlock Holmes. The story reveals she gave birth to a son, Damian Adle r, an artist now known as The Addler.

A duology series of young adult titles by author Claire M. Andrews about Adler's beginnings was published in August 2025. The first novel, A Beautiful and Terrible Murder, explores Adler's education and family history while she solves a series of murders at Oxford University alongside Sherlock. It is followed by a sequel, A Lovely and Deadly Dance, in which Adler and Holmes are partnered again.

=== Comic books ===
Marvel Comics character Destiny (Irene Adler) is a mutant with precognitive abilities. Destiny's connection to Sherlock Holmes stories had long being teased through her lover Mystique's past as a consulting detective, as both women were active in the late 19th century. Immortal X-Men #8 (2022) by Kieron Gillen explicitly canonized the connection, presenting Holmes as an identity used by Mystique and Destiny as her companion.

=== Manga ===
In the 2016 manga series Moriarty the Patriot, Irene Adler (アイリーンアドラー, Airīn'adorā) is featured as an expert cross-dresser and spy who impersonates the King of Bohemia to trick Sherlock Holmes and John Watson into taking her on as a roommate without pay. Later, the Moriarty brothers help her to fake her death to escape being assassinated, and she begins working for Mycroft Holmes and the British government under the guise of James Bonde (ジェームズ・ボンド, Jēmuzu Bondo).

=== Films ===
In the 1946 film Dressed to Kill, Adler is mentioned early in the film when Holmes and Watson discuss the events of "A Scandal in Bohemia".

English actress Charlotte Rampling played Irene Adler, now a music hall star and mother to a young son, Scott, kidnapped by Professor Moriarty (John Huston), in the TV film Sherlock Holmes in New York (1976), starring Roger Moore as Holmes and Patrick Macnee as Dr. Watson. Moore's son Geoffrey played the part of Scott Adler, and at the end of the film it is implied by his mother Irene that the boy is an offspring of Holmes'.

She is portrayed by Rachel McAdams in the 2009 film Sherlock Holmes. In that film, she is a femme fatale. A skilled professional thief, as well as a divorcée, Adler is no longer married to Godfrey Norton, and needs Holmes' help for the case. She and Holmes are depicted as having a deep and mutual infatuation, even while she is employed by Professor Moriarty.

McAdams reprised the role in the 2011 sequel Sherlock Holmes: A Game of Shadows in which Moriarty, deeming her position compromised by her love for Holmes, poisons and (apparently) kills her. Moriarty taunts Holmes about murdering Adler, and Holmes swears revenge, leading to their climactic battle at Reichenbach Falls.

=== Radio ===
Margaret Ward voiced Adler in a radio dramatisation of the short story "A Scandal in Bohemia" in 1954. The character was played by Gudrun Ure in a 1966 radio dramatisation of the same story. Both radio dramas aired on the BBC Light Programme. In 1977, Marian Seldes played Adler in the CBS Radio Mystery Theater radio adaptation of "A Scandal in Bohemia".

Sarah Badel portrayed Adler in the 7 November 1990 BBC Radio 4 broadcast of "A Scandal in Bohemia" opposite Clive Merrison's Holmes. Ellen McLain played Adler in the Imagination Theatre radio dramatisation of "A Scandal in Bohemia", which aired on 17 June 2012.

=== Stage ===
Adler was portrayed by Inga Swenson in the Broadway musical, Baker Street which also starred Fritz Weaver as Sherlock Holmes. According to the liner notes of the original cast album, the story makes extensive use of the story "A Scandal in Bohemia". The play opened at the Broadway Theatre, New York City, on 16 February 1965 and ran for 313 performances. The show's book was by Jerome Coopersmith and the music and lyrics were by Marian Grudeff and Raymond Jessel; the production was directed by Harold Prince.

=== Television series ===
Adler was played by Olga Edwardes in the episode "A Scandal in Bohemia" in the 1951 TV series Sherlock Holmes.

In the 1984 Granada Television series The Adventures of Sherlock Holmes starring Jeremy Brett, the first episode is "A Scandal in Bohemia", in which Adler is played by Gayle Hunnicutt.

In "A Scandal in Belgravia", the first episode of the 2012 second series of the BBC Sherlock, Adler was portrayed by Lara Pulver opposite Benedict Cumberbatch as Holmes. She is initially sought to recover incriminating photos she possesses of a liaison between her and a female member of the Royal Family, along with various other incriminating documents kept in a password-protected phone.

In the CBS series, Elementary, Adler is initially an unseen character in the first season, mentioned first in "Flight Risk" (2012) as a former love interest of Holmes. It is later explained that she apparently died at the hands of a serial killer Holmes was investigating known as "M", an event that fuelled Sherlock's descent into heroin addiction. In "M", Sherlock confronts M, revealed to be Sebastian Moran, and is told that Adler was not killed by Moran, but by his employer: Moriarty. In "Risk Management", it is explained that Adler was an American art restorer living in London. Holmes discovers Adler is alive, having been kept as Moriarty's prisoner in a dilapidated house. It is later revealed that Adler was a false identity assumed by Jamie Moriarty. Natalie Dormer played Adler/Moriarty in the final three episodes of the season.

In the 2013 Russian drama Sherlock Holmes, Adler takes a major role in the series and is portrayed by Lyanka Gryu.

In the 2014 Japanese puppetry television show, Sherlock Holmes, broadcast on NHK (日本放送協会, Nippon Hōsō Kyōkai, Japan Broadcasting Corporation), Adler is a school nurse of a fictional boarding school Beeton School. At first she has an affair with Headmaster Ormstein but takes up with another man Godfrey Norton who teaches art and sees through the plot of Holmes and Watson in "The Adventure of the Headmaster with Trouble" based on "A Scandal in Bohemia". She is voiced by Rie Miyazawa.

Adler appears in the original anime television series Case File nº221: Kabukicho (2019–2020), voiced by Maaya Sakamoto. In the anime television series Moriarty the Patriot, Adler is voiced by Yōko Hikasa, taking on the male guise of James Bonde to work as a spy.

In the 2025 series Watson, depicting a modern-day Doctor Watson running the Holmes Clinic after Sherlock's apparent death at Reichenbach, Irene Adler appears in "A Variant of Unknown Significance", portrayed by Whoopie Van Raam. She visits the clinic claiming that she seeks medical help for her son Angus, who she claims is Sherlock's son, but Watson deduces that Angus is just assisting the con and is neither ill or Sherlock's son. The goal was to acquire a sample of Sherlock's DNA to sell to Baron Adelbert Gruner ("The Adventure of the Illustrious Client"), who has moved on from "collecting" women to connecting genetic samples of particular geniuses. Realising that Adler is ill and was planning to sell the sample to Gruner in exchange for money to help set up her son for after her death, Watson offers an improved treatment plan for her illness that should at least extend Irene's life in exchange for her not selling the sample to Gruner, and volunteers to be Angus's guardian after her death.

=== Television films ===
In the 1976 film Sherlock Holmes in New York, Adler (Charlotte Rampling) helps Holmes and Watson to solve a bank robbery organised by Holmes' nemesis, Professor Moriarty, after he takes her son hostage to prevent Holmes from investigating the case. Holmes and Watson later rescue the boy, with a final conversation between Holmes and Adler at the conclusion of the case implying that Holmes is in fact the boy's father. This version of Adler is not an opera singer, but an actress.

Adler is featured in Soviet director Igor Maslennikov's made-for-TV 5-part film series The Adventures of Sherlock Holmes and Dr. Watson. She appears in the fourth part, The Treasures of Agra (1983), based upon The Sign of the Four (main storyline) and A Scandal in Bohemia (flashback), in which Holmes and Watson, while waiting for the new information on his current case, remember their encounter with Adler (played by Larisa Solovyova).

In the 1984 made-for-TV film The Masks of Death, a widowed Adler, played by Anne Baxter, is a guest at Graf Udo Von Felseck (Anton Diffring)'s country house where Holmes (Peter Cushing) and Watson (John Mills) are investigating the supposed disappearance of a visiting prince. Although Holmes initially considers her a suspect, she proves her innocence and becomes an ally.

In the 1991 television film Sherlock Holmes and the Leading Lady, Adler (Morgan Fairchild) reunites with an ageing Holmes (Christopher Lee) when a murder happens during her performance in Vienna. Holmes and Adler, whose flirtatious relationship with Sherlock is similar to Sherlock Holmes in New York's portrayal, briefly refer to past confrontations, including a rather confusing case where Adler had posed as a young boy to retrieve something hidden in Holmes's safe. Adler also explains that she was married for several years (Holmes having last seen her at the wedding previous to the film), only for her husband to die of illness two years before the film's events.

Liliana Komorowska portrayed Adler as a Polish opera singer in The Hallmark Channel's 2001 made-for-TV film The Royal Scandal opposite Matt Frewer's Holmes.

In 2007's BBC Television production Sherlock Holmes and the Baker Street Irregulars, Adler (portrayed by Anna Chancellor) is the main villain of the piece and one of Sherlock Holmes' archenemies instead of a potential love interest.

=== TV episodes of unrelated series ===
In an episode of the PBS Kids show Wishbone, actress Sally Nystuen Vahle portrays Adler for the adaptation of "A Scandal in Bohemia" entitled "A Dogged Exposé" (1995).

In the television series House, James Wilson tells a story about Adler, a patient with whom Gregory House was obsessed and fell in love, in the 2008 episode "Joy to the World".

In "The 10 Li'l Grifters Job" (2011), the season 4 episode 2 of Leverage, the character Sophie portrays Adler at the Murder Mystery Masquerade.

In the season five episode of The Flash entitled "Goldfaced" (2019), detective Sherloque Wells meets Renee Adler (portrayed by Kimberly Williams-Paisley), the Earth-1 doppelgänger of his five ex-wives. She is later shown to be a metahuman with possible telekinetic powers; upon seeing this, Sherloque vows to protect her from the serial killer Cicada. During the episode, Sherloque also has an encounter with four of his ex-wives, all of whom are variants of Adler. Now that they know which Earth he is on, they demand their back alimony payments be met within a month, or they will have a multiverse-traveling bounty hunter come and collect the payments for them.

== Controversy in modern adaptations ==
Despite Adler's brief appearance in the Sherlock Holmes canon, she has become the sole woman character the audience associates with Holmes in contemporary adaptations. With the character's popularity, comes a significant change in canon where Adler is framed as a romantic liaison of Holmes. Heavier emphasis is placed on her "body" and physical representation by hinging on tropes of sexuality.

There is a claim that Adler is a feminist/proto-feminist character. Some argue that, Adler "serves as a feminist symbol within a literary series that predominantly praises masculine behavior" and shows that "even in 1891, strong feminist characters existed". Due to Adler's unique position of being a woman who outsmarted Holmes, many claim that she is a feminist character and therefore should be adapted as such.

On the contrary, some claim that, despite Adler's outsmarting of Holmes, she should not be regarded as a feminist character. Although Adler is uncharacteristically independent, at the end of "A Scandal in Bohemia", Holmes still comes to "acquire" her in the form of a photo, following the anti-feminist view of women as objects. There also is an argument that Adler still abides by female gender roles, seeking just to get married and be subservient to her husband. One notable proponent of this idea is Steven Moffat, creator of A Scandal in Belgravia who claims:

"In the original, Irene Adler's victory over Sherlock Holmes was to move house and run away with her husband. That's not a feminist victory."

As such, modern reinventions of Adler almost always attempt a "post-feminist metamorphosis" by providing her autonomy over her body where she can maneuver her sexuality to exert control over the male-centered narrative. Through a liberal feminist lens, Adler's sexualized role names and confronts the power of men to the male audience in order to defy the patriarchal structure.

However, this deviation from the source material has become heavily criticized as problematic in nature. By "sex-ing" up her character, postmodern adaptations "failed to re-appropriate [Adler] from its Victorian original by falling back on dominant masculine discourses". Critics attribute this deviation to the "sensationist urge" to make modern Victorian adaptations more "sexy and sexual" by "introducing nudity and sexually risqué narrative elements".

=== Sherlock Holmes (2009) and Sherlock Holmes: A Game of Shadows (2011) ===
Guy Ritchie's Adler is straightforwardly Holmes' love interest. In both films, she claims authority by weaponizing her sex appeal. Her power is mostly equated with her clothing or the absence of it. As opposed to the autonomous agency of Doyle's version, Adler is an agent of Professor Moriarty and obeys his instructions without any independent arc of her own, functioning as a pawn and an intellectual inferior compared to her male counterparts.

Regarding the scene where she dresses in front of Holmes, kisses him passionately and drugs him before leaving him handcuffed to the bed, it is observed by Rhonda L. H. Taylor that,

"[h]er overt sexuality is a weapon used with the intent and result of disorienting Holmes and making him appear foolish, an emasculating (sic.). This Adler uses her female nudity as a disguise/deception to best Holmes, rather than assuming the canonical Adler's disguise as a young man to accomplish the same goal."

=== "A Scandal in Belgravia" (2012) ===
One of the most controversial takes on Adler is an episode of the BBC series Sherlock titled "A Scandal in Belgravia". Her introduction was a response to criticism across the internet over the domination of male characters in the first season of the show while the female characters are always portrayed to be "arrested, avenged, ridiculed or rescued". Adler is presented in the first episode as an antagonist who uses her sexuality through her dominatrix position in order to gain secrets and other information to blackmail her clients. In reality however, she is later revealed to still be under the mercy of the men around her, who still have the real authority and control. Critics point out that even in a dominatrix framing where the woman occupies a dominant role, they are still following the orders of their male counterpart and focusing on the satisfaction of a male consumer.

Some critics defended Adler's portrayal in her initial scenes, pointing to moments when she physically overpowers Sherlock with a riding crop or when Sherlock fails to deduce anything from her naked body. In an interview to the Guardian, Steven Moffat, co-creator of the series defends this portrayal of Adler, stating, "in the original, Irene Adler's victory over Sherlock Holmes was to move house and run away with her husband. That's not a feminist victory."

However, to most critics, the misogyny behind the character was shown in the final scenes. Adler's power becomes temporary as she is revealed to be a confederate in Jim Moriarty's schemes. As she remarks in the episode's final moments, "I had a bit of help. I had all this stuff, and never knew what to do with it. Thank God for [Jim Moriarty]." Later, Sherlock claims victory over her by deducing her emotions with his cold rationality and Moriarty's protection is lost and control over her is reinstated to Sherlock, once again encasing the autonomy of Adler within masculine boundaries. Critics point out that "Irene fears bodily injury. Her phone, the sensitive information stored within it, both protects and endangers Irene's body... its loss exposing her to physical harm" and that between Sherlock, Moriarty or Mycroft Holmes, all three men have more power and resources to force Adler to be compliant in order to survive.

Critics also claim that her overall role in the episode reinforces the prostitution paradigm, that all women are sexual property of men. Rather than belonging to one man, Adler functions as "public property" and her only real use is her sexual function, following the trend of women's role in the Sherlock series as "conduit[s] for male power...as the object of sexual dominance, they are necessary to release that power. But they do not acquire power themselves; it is, instead, passed on to Holmes."

In her final appearance in the episode, a hijab-clad Adler is rescued by Sherlock from the hands of a terrorist cell in Pakistan. This scene garnered widespread criticism. In the essay "Postfeminism and Screen Adaptations of Sherlock Holmes Stories: The Case of Irene Adler", Antonija Primorac observes,

By the end of the episode, the dangerously sexual female nude body of the metropolitan center is displaced into a Pakistani desert and transformed into a kneeling powerless bundle of indigo-blue wraps that set off her tear-sodden face. The luminous skin of her 'battledress', of the naked female body-as-weapon, is supplanted by a crestfallen figure in a hijab. In a stereotypically Victorian fashion that does not feature in Doyle's text, Adler's use of her own body as a means of power turns her into a fallen woman who has to be punished, banished to the former colonial space and saved by the hero.

== Name pronunciation ==
Different pronunciations of "Irene" have been proposed for Adler. The 19th-century British pronunciation of the name was /aɪˈriːniː/ eye-REE-nee, which has been used for Adler's first name in some adaptations, including the BBC 1989–98 radio series.

The standard American pronunciation of the name, /aɪˈriːn/ eye-REEN, would be appropriate since Adler is said to be from New Jersey, and was current in America at the time the story was written. It may also be pronounced this way in modern British usage. This pronunciation has been used in television adaptations such as Elementary, Cashville and Sherlock. Another pronunciation, /iːˈreɪnə/ ee-RAY-nuh, was used in the Granada television series. This pronunciation has a "continental flavour" fitting Adler's career as an opera singer in continental Europe.

== Portrayals ==
=== Radio and audio dramas ===
Name	Title	Date	Network
Margaret Ward	The Adventures of Sherlock Holmes – "A Scandal in Bohemia"	1954	BBC Light Programme
Gudrun Ure	Sherlock Holmes – "A Scandal in Bohemia"	1966	BBC Light Programme
Marian Seldes	CBS Radio Mystery Theater – "A Scandal in Bohemia"	1977	CBS Radio
Sarah Badel	The Adventures of Sherlock Holmes – "A Scandal in Bohemia"	1990	BBC Radio 4
Lindsay Whisler	Moriarty	2022	Scripted podcast (Audible)
Arielle Goldman	Moriarty	2023	Scripted podcast (Audible)
Chloe Zeitounian	Sherlock & Co.	2025	Goalhanger Podcasts

=== Stage plays ===
Name	Title	Date	Type
Inga Swenson	Baker Street	1965	Musical (Broadway)
Tanya Franks	Sherlock Holmes: The Best Kept Secret	2013	Play by Mark Catley
Renee Olstead	Sherlock Holmes	2015	Play by Greg Kramer
Sarab Kamoo	Sherlock Holmes and the Adventure of the Elusive Ear	2018	Plays by David MacGregor
Sarab Kamoo	Sherlock Holmes and the Adventure of the Fallen Soufflé	2019	Plays by David MacGregor
Sarab Kamoo	Sherlock Holmes and the Adventure of the Ghost Machine	2022	Plays by David MacGregor

=== Television and DTV films ===
Name	Title	Date	Type
Charlotte Rampling	Sherlock Holmes in New York	1976	Television film (American)
Anne Baxter	The Masks of Death	1984	Television film (British)
Morgan Fairchild	Sherlock Holmes and the Leading Lady	1992	Television film
Carolyn Wilkinson	The Hound of London	1993	Television film (Luxembourgish-Canadian)
Liliana Komorowska	The Royal Scandal	2001	Television film (Canadian)
Anna Chancellor	Sherlock Holmes and the Baker Street Irregulars	2007	Television film (British)

=== Television series ===
Name	Title	Date	Type
Olga Edwardes	Sherlock Holmes – "A Scandal in Bohemia"	1951	(British)
Larisa Solovyova	The Adventures of Sherlock Holmes and Dr. Watson – "The Treasures of Agra"	1983	(Russian)
Gayle Hunnicutt	The Adventures of Sherlock Holmes – "A Scandal in Bohemia"	1984	(British)
Lara Pulver	Sherlock – "A Scandal in Belgravia"	2012	(British)
Lara Pulver	Sherlock – "The Sign of Three"	2014	(British)
Natalie Dormer	Elementary	2013–2015	(American)
Lyanka Gryu	Sherlock Holmes	2013	(Russian)
Rie Miyazawa	Sherlock Holmes	2014–2015	(Japanese)
Maaya Sakamoto	Case File nº221: Kabukicho	2019	(Japanese)
Yoko Hikasa	Moriarty the Patriot	2020–2021	TV anime series (Japanese)
Natalie Van Sistine	Moriarty the Patriot	2020–2021	TV anime series (Japanese) (English dub)
Whoopie Van Raam	Watson – "A Variant of Unknown Significance"	2025	(American)

=== Theatrical films ===
Name	Title	Date	Type
Rachel McAdams	Sherlock Holmes	2009	(British–American)
Rachel McAdams	Sherlock Holmes: A Game of Shadows	2011	(British–American)
Belén López	Holmes & Watson. Madrid Days	2012	(Spanish)
Mary J Blige	Sherlock Gnomes	2018	Paramount
