= Patrick Macnee =

British-American actor (1922–2015)

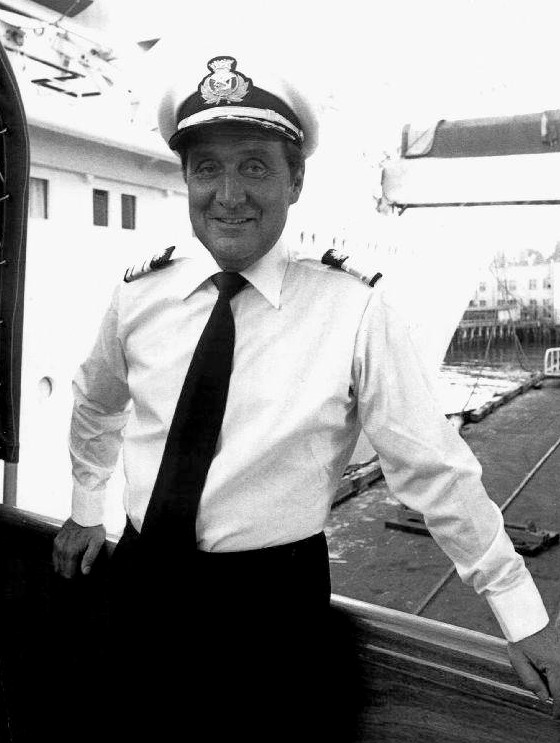
- Macnee in an episode of Columbo, 1975
- Born: Daniel Patrick Macnee; 6 February 1922; Paddington, London, England
- Died: 25 June 2015 (aged 93); Rancho Mirage, California, U.S.
- Citizenship: United Kingdom; United States (from 1959)
- Education: Eton College
- Occupation: Actor
- Years active: 1938–2005
- Known for: John Steed in The Avengers
- Spouses: Barbara Douglas (m. 1942; div. 1956); Katherine Woodville (m. 1965; div. 1969); Baba Majos de Nagyzsenye (m. 1988; died 2007)
- Children: 2
- Mother: Dorothea Macnee

Daniel Patrick Macnee (6 February 1922 – 25 June 2015) was a British and American actor, best known for his breakthrough role as secret agent John Steed in the television series The Avengers (1961–1969). Starting out as the assistant to David Keel (Ian Hendry), he became the lead when Hendry left after the first series, and was subsequently partnered with a succession of female assistants. He later reprised the role in The New Avengers (1976–1977).

Born in London as the eldest son of socialite Dorothea Macnee, Macnee served in the Royal Navy during the Second World War before starting his career as an actor in British television. He appeared in numerous television series up until 2001, including the Twilight Zone episode "Judgement Night" (1959); Columbo; Magnum, P.I.; Hart to Hart; Murder, She Wrote; The Love Boat; and Frasier. In 1984, he was the subject of the British television series This Is Your Life.

Macnee also appeared in Oasis's music video for "Don't Look Back in Anger" (1996). He and Avengers co-star Honor Blackman had a UK Top 10 hit in 1990 when their 1964 song "Kinky Boots" received renewed interest from being played on BBC Radio One.

Macnee's notable film roles include young Jacob Marley in Scrooge (1951), Sir Denis Eton-Hogg in This Is Spinal Tap (1984), and Sir Godfrey Tibbett in A View to a Kill (1985). He is one of the few actors to have played both Sherlock Holmes and Dr. Watson in different productions (as well as a character who thinks he is Sherlock Holmes in an episode of Magnum PI)

== Early life and career ==
The elder of two sons, Daniel Patrick Macnee was born in the Paddington area of Central London, on 6 February 1922; to Daniel Macnee (1878–1952) and British socialite Dorothea Mabel Macnee (née Henry) (1896–1984). His father, who was a grandson of the Scottish artist Sir Daniel Macnee, trained race horses in Lambourn, and was known for his dress sense; he had served as an officer in the Yorkshire Dragoons in the First World War. His maternal grandmother was Frances Alice Hastings (1870–1945), who was the daughter of Vice-Admiral George Fowler Hastings and granddaughter of the 12th Earl of Huntingdon. His younger brother James, known as Jimmy, was born five years later. Macnee saw himself as a Scot.

Macnee's parents separated after his mother came out as a lesbian. His father later moved to India, and his mother began to live with her wealthy partner, Evelyn Spottiswoode, whose money came from the Dewar's whisky business. Macnee referred to her in his autobiography as "Uncle Evelyn", and she helped pay for his schooling. He was educated at Summer Fields School and Eton College, where he was a member of the Officer Training Corps and was one of the guard of honour for King George V at St George's Chapel in 1936. He was later expelled from Eton for selling pornography to and being a bookmaker for his fellow students.

Macnee studied acting at the Webber Douglas Academy of Dramatic Art, but shortly before he was to perform in his first West End leading role, which would have had him acting alongside Vivien Leigh, he was called up for the Royal Navy. He joined as an ordinary seaman in October 1942 and was commissioned a sub-lieutenant in June 1943, becoming a navigator on Motor Torpedo Boats in the English Channel and North Sea. Reassigned as first lieutenant on a second MTB, Macnee caught bronchitis just before D-Day; while he was recuperating in hospital, his boat and crew were lost in action. Two of the crew received the Distinguished Service Medal. He left the Royal Navy in 1946 as a lieutenant.

Macnee nurtured his acting career in Canada early on, but he also appeared as an uncredited extra in the British films Pygmalion (1938), The Life and Death of Colonel Blimp (1943) and Laurence Olivier's Hamlet (1948), as well as some live TV dramas for the BBC, before graduating to credited roles in such films as Scrooge (US: A Christmas Carol, 1951), as young Jacob Marley; the Gene Kelly vehicle Les Girls (1957), as an Old Bailey barrister; and the war film The Battle of the River Plate (1956).

Between these occasional movie roles, Macnee spent the better part of the 1950s working in dozens of small roles in American and Canadian television and theatre. In 1954, he appeared on stage in Richard of Bordeaux and Haste to the Wedding at the Crest Theatre in Toronto., Macnee would later look back on those experiences at the Crest and the CBC as defining when he finally became an actor. On television, he appeared in an episode of One Step Beyond ("Night of April 14th") and The Twilight Zone ("Judgment Night") in 1959. Disappointed in his limited career development, by the late 1950s Macnee was smoking 80 cigarettes and drinking a bottle of whisky on a daily basis.

In the early 1960s, before his career-making role in The Avengers, Macnee took a break from acting and served as one of the London-based producers for the classic documentary series The Valiant Years, based on the Second World War memoirs of Winston Churchill.

== The Avengers ==
While working in London on the Churchill series, Macnee was offered the role in The Avengers (1961–69), for which he became best known. The series was conceived as a vehicle for Ian Hendry, who played the lead role of Dr. David Keel in a sequel to an earlier series, Police Surgeon (1960), while John Steed was his assistant. Macnee, though, became the lead after Hendry's departure at the end of the first series. Macnee played opposite a succession of glamorous female partners: Honor Blackman, Diana Rigg and Linda Thorson. Of the 161 completed episodes, Macnee appeared in all but two, both from the first series.

Although Macnee evolved in the role as the series progressed, the key elements of Steed's persona and appearance were present from the beginning: the slightly mysterious demeanour and, increasingly, the light, suave, flirting tone with ladies (and always with his female partners). Finally, from the episodes with Blackman onwards, the trademark bowler hat and umbrella completed the image. Although it was traditionally associated with London "city gents", the ensemble of suit, umbrella and bowler had developed in the post-war years as mufti for ex-servicemen attending Armistice Day ceremonies. Steed's sartorial style may also have been drawn from Macnee's father. Macnee, alongside designer Pierre Cardin, adapted the look into a style all his own, and he went on to design several outfits himself for Steed based on the same basic theme. Steed was also the central character of The New Avengers (1976–77), in which he was teamed with agents named Purdey (Joanna Lumley) and Mike Gambit (Gareth Hunt).

Macnee insisted on, and was proud of, almost never carrying a gun in the original series; when asked why, he explained, "I'd just come out of a World War in which I'd seen most of my friends blown to bits." Lumley later said she did most of the gun-slinging in The New Avengers for the same reason.

When asked in June 1982 which Avengers female lead was his favourite, Macnee declined to give a specific answer. "Well, I'd rather not say. To do so would invite trouble," he told TV Week magazine. Macnee did provide his evaluation of the female leads. Of Honor Blackman he said, "She was wonderful, presenting the concept of a strong-willed, independent and liberated woman just as that sort of woman was beginning to emerge in society." Diana Rigg was "One of the world's great actresses. A superb comedienne. I'm convinced that one day she'll be Dame Diana" (his prediction came true in 1994). Linda Thorson was "one of the sexiest women alive" while Joanna Lumley was "superb in the role of Purdey. An actress who is only now realising her immense potential."

Macnee co-wrote two original novels based upon The Avengers during the 1960s, titled Dead Duck and Deadline. He hosted the documentary The Avengers: The Journey Back (1998), directed by Clyde Lucas.

For the critically lambasted film version of The Avengers (1998), he lent his voice in a cameo as Invisible Jones. The character John Steed was taken over by Ralph Fiennes.

== Later roles ==
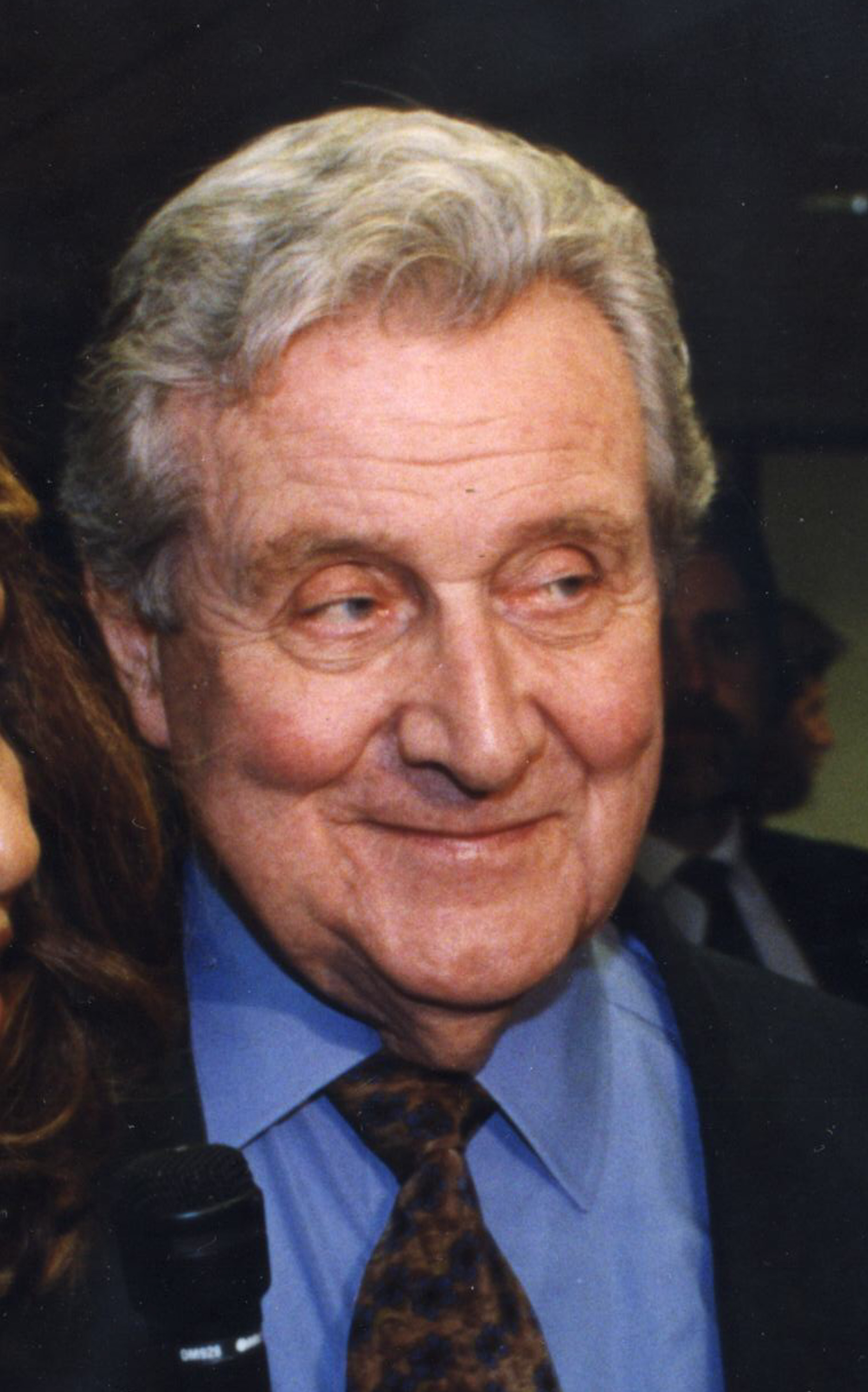
Macnee in 1998

Macnee's other significant roles included playing Sir Godfrey Tibbett opposite Roger Moore in the James Bond film A View to a Kill (1985); as Major Crossley in The Sea Wolves (again with Moore); guest roles in Encounter; Alias Smith and Jones (for Glen A. Larson); Magnum, P.I.; Hart to Hart; Murder, She Wrote and The Love Boat. Although his best known role was heroic, many of his television appearances were as villains; among them were his roles of both the demonic Count Iblis and his provision of the character voice of the Cylons' Imperious Leader in Battlestar Galactica, also for Glen A. Larson, for which he also supplied the show's introductory voiceover. He also presented the American paranormal series Mysteries, Magic and Miracles. Macnee appeared on Broadway as the star of Anthony Shaffer's mystery Sleuth in 1972–73.

Macnee reunited with Diana Rigg in her short-lived sitcom Diana (1973) in a single episode. Other television appearances include a guest appearance on Columbo in the episode "Troubled Waters" (1975); and playing Major Vickers in For the Term of his Natural Life (1983). He had recurring roles in the crime series Gavilan with Robert Urich and in the short-lived satire on big business, Empire (1984), as Dr. Calvin Cromwell. Macnee was known for narrating various James Bond Documentaries on Special Edition DVD. He also narrated the documentary Ian Fleming: 007's Creator (2000).

Macnee featured prominently in two editions of the long-running British television series This Is Your Life: in 1978, when he and host Eamonn Andrews, both dressed as Steed, surprised Ian Hendry, and in 1984 when he was the edition's unsuspecting subject. Therefore, he also voiced the narrator in the Audrey Wood VHS adaptation of The Little Mouse, the Red Ripe Strawberry, and the Big Hungry Bear.

Macnee also appeared in several cult films: in The Howling (1981), as Dr. George Waggner (named whimsically after the director of The Wolf Man, 1941) and as Sir Denis Eton-Hogg in the rockumentary comedy This Is Spinal Tap (1984). He played Dr. Stark in The Creature Wasn't Nice (1981), also called Spaceship and Naked Space. Macnee played the role of actor David Mathews in the television movie Rehearsal for Murder (1982), which starred Robert Preston and Lynn Redgrave. The movie was from a script written by Columbo co-creators Richard Levinson and William Link. He replaced Leo G. Carroll's character as the head of U.N.C.L.E. as Sir John Raleigh in Return of the Man from U.N.C.L.E. (1983), produced by Michael Sloan. He was featured in the science fiction television movie Super Force (1990) as E. B. Hungerford (the subsequent series featured Macnee's voiceover as part of a computer simulation of his character), as a supporting character in the parody film Lobster Man from Mars (1989) as Professor Plocostomos and in the television film The Return of Sam McCloud (1989) as Tom Jamison. He made an appearance in Frasier (2001), and several episodes of the American sci-fi series Nightman as Dr. Walton, a psychiatrist who advised the main character. Macnee appeared in two episodes of the series Kung Fu: The Legend Continues (1993–94) and was a retired agent in a handful of instalments of Spy Game (1997–98).

Macnee made numerous TV commercials including one around 1990 for Swiss Chalet, the Canadian restaurant chain, and a year or so before, a commercial for the Sterling Motor Car Company. Over the James Bond theme, the car duels with a motorcycle assailant at high speed through mountainous territory, ultimately eludes the foe, and reaches its destination. Macnee steps out of the car and greets viewers with a smile, saying "I suppose you were expecting someone else". Macnee was the narrator for several "behind-the-scenes" featurettes for the James Bond series of DVDs and recorded numerous audio books, including the releases of many novels by Jack Higgins. He also recorded the children's books The Musical Life of Gustav Mole and its sequel, The Lost Music (Gustav Mole's War on Noise), both written by Michael Twinn.

Macnee featured in two pop videos: as Steed in original Avengers footage in The Pretenders' video for their song "Don't Get Me Wrong" (1986) and in the promotion for Oasis' video "Don't Look Back in Anger" (1996), as the band's driver, a role similar to that which he played in the James Bond film A View to a Kill (1985). In 1990, his recording with his Avengers co-star Honor Blackman, called "Kinky Boots" (1964), reached the UK Singles Chart after being played on Simon Mayo's BBC Radio One breakfast show.

=== Sherlock Holmes and Doctor Watson ===
Macnee appeared in Magnum, P.I. (1984) as a retired British agent who suffered from the delusion that he was Sherlock Holmes, in a season four episode titled Holmes Is Where the Heart Is. He played both Holmes and Dr. Watson on several occasions. He played Watson three times: once alongside Roger Moore's Sherlock Holmes in the television film Sherlock Holmes in New York (1976), and twice with Christopher Lee, first in Sherlock Holmes and the Leading Lady (1991), and then in Incident at Victoria Falls (1992). He played Holmes in another television film The Hound of London (1993), along with the Canadian television film Sherlock Holmes: The Case of the Temporal Nexus (1996). He is thus one of only a small number of actors to have portrayed both Sherlock Holmes and Dr. Watson on screen.

== Personal life ==
Macnee married his first wife Barbara Douglas (1921–2012) in 1942. They had two children, Rupert and Jenny, and a grandson, Christopher ("Kit"). After they were divorced in 1956, his second marriage (1965–1969) was to actress Katherine Woodville. From 1973 to 1991, Macnee owned a home in the Deep Well neighborhood of Palm Springs, California. His third marriage was to Baba Majos de Nagyzsenye, daughter of opera singer Ella Némethy. It lasted from 1988 until her death in 2007. Macnee became a United States citizen in 1959. He dictated his autobiography, which he titled Blind in One Ear: The Avenger Returns (1988), to Marie Cameron. Later in life, Macnee was an enthusiastic naturist.

== Death ==
On 25 June 2015, Macnee died at Rancho Mirage, California, his home for the previous four decades, at the age of 93. Tributes were paid by co-stars Roger Moore and Nicola Bryant, and by fellow Avengers leads Diana Rigg and Linda Thorson.

== Filmography ==
=== Film ===
Year	Title	Role	Notes	ref
1938	Pygmalion	Extra	Uncredited	
1943	The Life and Death of Colonel Blimp	Extra	Uncredited	
1948	The Fatal Night	Tony		
1948	Hamlet	Extra	Uncredited	
1949	The Small Back Room	Man at Committee Meeting	Uncredited	
1949	All Over the Town	Mr. Vince		
1949	The Elusive Pimpernel	Honorable John Bristow	Released in the United States as The Fighting Pimpernel	
1950	The Girl Is Mine	Hugh Hurcombe		
1950	Seven Days to Noon	Bit Part	Uncredited	
1950	Dick Barton at Bay	Phillips	Credited as Patrick McNee	
1951	Flesh and Blood	Sutherland	Uncredited	
1951	Scrooge	Young Jacob Marley	Released in the United States as A Christmas Carol	
1955	Three Cases of Murder	Guard Subaltern	Uncredited	
1956	The Battle of the River Plate	Lieutenant Commander Ralph Medley		
1957	Les Girls	Sir Percy	Also known as Cole Porter's Les Girls	
1957	Until They Sail	Private Duff	(scenes deleted)	
1970	Incense for the Damned	Derek Longbow	Also released as Bloodsuckers, Freedom Seeker and Doctors Wear Scarlet	
1970	Mister Jerico	Dudley Jerico		
1978	Battlestar Galactica	Imperious Leader/Narrator	Voice; Uncredited	
1979	The Billion Dollar Threat	Horatio Black		
1979	King Solomon's Treasure	Captain John Good R.N.	Macnee replaced Terry-Thomas.	
1980	The Sea Wolves	Major 'Yogi' Crossley		
1981	The Howling	Dr. George Waggner		
1981	The Hot Touch	Vincent Reyblack		
1981	The Creature Wasn't Nice	Dr. Stark	Also known as Naked Space and Spaceship	
1982	Young Doctors in Love	Jacobs		
1982	Sweet Sixteen	Dr. John Morgan		
1984	This Is Spinal Tap	Sir Denis Eton-Hogg		
1985	A View to a Kill	Sir Godfrey Tibbett		
1985	Shadey	Sir Cyril Landau		
1988	Waxwork	Sir Wilfred		
1988	Transformations	Father Christopher		
1989	Chill Factor	Carl Lawton		
1989	Lobster Man from Mars	Professor Plocostomos		
1989	Masque of the Red Death	Machiavel		
1991	Eye of the Widow	Andrew Marcus		
1992	Waxwork II: Lost in Time	Sir Wilfred		
1992	VHS Adaptation of The Little Mouse, the Red Ripe Strawberry, and the Big Hungry Bear	Narrator	Before The Big Hungry Bear (Twenty-Four Robbers); After The Big Hungry Bear (Quick as a Cricket); 13 minutes	
1993	King B: A Life in the Movies	Himself		
1998	The Avengers	Invisible Jones, a Ministry Agent	Voice only. Adaptation of the 1960s TV series Macnee had starred in	
2002	Puckoon	RUC Officer	Non speaking cameo appearance	
2003	The Low Budget Time Machine	Dr. Ballard		

=== Television ===
Year	Title	Role	Notes	ref
1948	Wuthering Heights	Edgar Linton	BBC adaptation of the novel in single play format	
1950–1953	BBC Sunday Night Theatre	Various	5 episodes	
1952–1953	Tales of Adventure	Roger Sudden	12 episodes	
1955–1958	On Camera	Various	9 episodes	
1956-1958	Matinee Theater	Various	9 episodes	
1956-1958	Kraft Theatre	Various	6 episodes	
1956	Producers' Showcase	Lucius Septimus	Episode: "Caesar and Cleopatra"	
1956	Armstrong Circle Theatre	Quayle	Episode: "The Case of Colonel Petrov"	
1958	The Veil	Constable Hawton	Episode: "Vision of Crime"	
1959	Rawhide	Henry Watkins	Episode: "Incident of the 14th Man"	
1959	The Twilight Zone	First Officer	Episode: "Judgment Night"	
1959	Alfred Hitchcock Presents	Sergeant John Theron/Professor Kersley	2 episodes	
1959	Alcoa Presents: One Step Beyond	Fiancé	Episode: "Night of April 14th"	
1959–1960	The Swamp Fox	British Captain	Main cast	
1960–1964	Armchair Theatre	Various	3 episodes	
1961–1969	The Avengers	John Steed	Main Cast	
1964–1966	Love Story	Various	3 episodes	
1970	The Virginian	Connor	Episode: "A Kings Ransom"	
1971	Alias Smith and Jones	Norman Alexander	Episode: "The Man Who Murdered Himself"	
1971	Night Gallery	Major Crosby	Episode: "Logoda's Heads"	
1973	Diana	Bryan Harris	Episode: "You Can't Go Back"	
1974	Orson Welles Great Mysteries	Charles Foster	Episode: "A Time to Remember"	
1975	Columbo	Captain Gibbon	Episode: "Troubled Waters"	
1975	Khan!	Marcus Graham	Episode: "A Game of Terror"	
1975	Matt Helm	Colonel Shawcross	Pilot	
1976	Sherlock Holmes in New York	Dr. Watson	Television film	
1976–1977	The New Avengers	John Steed	Main cast	
1977	Dead of Night	Dr. Gheria	Television film	
1978	Evening in Byzantium	Ian Waldeigh	2 episodes	
1978	The Hardy Boys	"S" (ostensibly John Steed)	Episode: "Asssault on the Tower"	
1978	Battlestar Galactica	Imperious Leader/Narrator / Count Iblis	Voice for episodes: 1–12 (*uncredited) Count Iblis: "War of The Gods" episodes: 15 & 16 (credited)	
1979	$weepstake$	Rodney	Episode: "Vince, Pete and Patsy, Jessica and Rodney"	
1980	The Littlest Hobo	Elmer	Episode: "Diamonds Are a Dog's Best Friend"	
1982	Rehearsal for Murder	David Mathews	Television film	
1982–1983	Gavilan	Milo Bentley	Main cast	
1983	Return of the Man from U.N.C.L.E.	Sir John Raleigh	Television film	
1983	For the Term of his Natural Life	Major Vickers	Miniseries	
1983	Automan	Lydell Hamilton	Episode: "Automan"	
1984	Empire	Calvin Cromwell	Miniseries	
1984	Magnum, P.I.	David Worth	Episode: "Holmes Is Where the Heart Is"	
1984	Hart to Hart	Matthew Grade	Episode: "Meanwhile, Back at the Ranch"	
1984	The Love Boat	David Blake	2 episodes	
1985	Lime Street	Sir Geoffrey Rimbatten	Main cast	
1985–1992	Murder, She Wrote	Oliver Trumbull/Dayton Whitling	2 episodes	
1986	Blacke's Magic	Nigel Beechum	Episode: "It's a Jungle Out There"	
1988	Alfred Hitchcock Presents	Thadddeus	Episode: "Survival of the Fittest"	
1988	Murphy's Law	Frank Houlihan	Episode: "Do Someone a Favor and It Becomes Your Job"	
1989	War of the Worlds	Valery Kedrov	Episode: "Epiphany"	
1989	Around the World in 80 Days	Ralph Gautier	Miniseries	
1989	Dick Francis: Blood Sport	Geoffrey Keeble	TV movie	
1989	Dick Francis: In the Frame	Geoffrey Keeble	TV movie	
1989	Dick Francis: Twice Shy	Geoffrey Keeble	TV movie	
1989	The Return of Sam McCloud	Tom Jamison	Television movie of the series	
1990	The Ray Bradbury Theater	Stendahl	Episode: "Usher II"	
1990–1992	Super Force	Voice of E.B. Hungerford	48 episodes	
1991	Sherlock Holmes and the Leading Lady	Dr. Watson	Television film	
1991	The Gambler Returns: The Luck of the Draw	Sir Colin	Miniseries	
1992	Coach	Mr. Thind	Episode: "Dresswreckers"	
1992	Incident at Victoria Falls	Dr. Watson	Television film	
1993	The Hound of London	Sherlock Holmes	Television film	
1993	Kung Fu: The Legend Continues	Steadman	2 episodes	
1994	Thunder in Paradise	Edward Whitaker	Main cast	
1996	The Case of the Temporal Nexus	Sherlock Holmes	Television film	
1997	Diagnosis: Murder	John Garrison	Episode: "Discards"	
1997–1998	Night Man	Dr. Walton	Recurring	
1997	Spy Game	Mr. Black	Episode: "Why Spy?"	
1997	Light Lunch	Himself	Episode: "The Avengers... Still Kinky After All These Years"	
1997	Diagnosis: Murder	Bernard Garrison	Episode: "Discards"	
1999	Nancherrow	Lord Peter Awliscombe	Miniseries	
1999	Through the Keyhole	House Owner	Episode: "29 March 1999"	
2000	Family Law	Sir Thomas Matthews	Episode: "Second Chance"	
2001	Frasier	Cecil Headley	Episode: "The Show Must Go Off"	
2003	That Was the Week We Watched	Himself	Episode: "11–17 April 1970"	
2005	After They Were Famous	Himself	Episode: "Crimefighters"	

=== Theatre ===
Year	Title	Role	Notes
1941–1942	Little Women	Laurie	Westminster Theatre
1947	The White Devil		Duchess Theatre
1949	The Chiltern Hundreds	Lord Pym	Theatre Royal, Windsor
1951	Victoria Regina	Prince Albert	Theatre Royal, Windsor
1951	An Instrument of Justice		Theatre Royal, Windsor
1951	Rest Hour	Donald Gray	Theatre Royal, Windsor
1951	Ardèle	Nicholas	Royal Court Theatre, Liverpool, Opera House, Manchester, and other locations.
1951	Mansfield Park	Henry Crawford	Theatre Royale, Windsor
1952	The Wedding Ring	Tom Gillies	Opera House, Manchester, Grand Theatre & Opera House, Leeds, and other locations.
1954	A Midsummer Night's Dream	Demetrius	Metropolitan Opera
1970–1973	Sleuth	Andrew Wyke	Music Box Theatre
1971	Softly, Goldfish Mating	Daniel Dirvish	Theatre Royal, Brighton, Grand Theatre, Wolverhampton, and other locations.
1978	Sleuth	Andrew Wyke	Ambassadors Theatre, Savoy Theatre
1979	The Grass is Greener	Victor	Theatre Royal, Bath, Yvonne Arnaud Theatre, and other locations.
1986–1987	Killing Jessica	Alex Dennison	Savoy Theatre and Richmond Theatre.

=== Documentaries ===
- Real Ghost Stories: The Dead and the Restless (1997) (Note: All of the documentaries are narrated by voice only.)
- Real Ghost Stories: The Wild West of the Dead (1997)
- Real Ghost Stories: Spirits, Graveyards & Ghostbusters (1997)
- Real Ghost Stories: The Poltergeists (1997)
- Real Ghost Stories: The London Underworld & Beyond (1997)
- Unexplained Mysteries: Nostradamus (1999 Front Row Entertainment, Inc.)
- Unexplained Mysteries: Out of Body Experience (1999 Front Row Entertainment, Inc.)
- Unexplained Mysteries: Haunted Historic Sites (1999 Front Row Entertainment, Inc.)
- Unexplained Mysteries: Miracle Healings (2000 Front Row Entertainment, Inc.)
- Unexplained Mysteries: World of Satanism (2000 Front Row Entertainment, Inc.)
- Unexplained Mysteries: Jack The Ripper (2001 Front Row Entertainment, Inc.)
- Unexplained Mysteries: Cryonics (2001 Front Row Entertainment, Inc.)
- Ian Fleming: 007's Creator (2000)
- The Spirit of Diana (2003)
- Unlocking DaVinci's Code (2004)
- The Witnessing of Angels (2010)
- Real Ghost Stories: Hollywood Ghosts (2010)

=== Music videos ===
- The Pretenders – "Don't Get Me Wrong" (1986) (Steed in original Avengers footage)
- Oasis – "Don't Look Back in Anger" (1996)
