= The Adventures of Sherlock Holmes (1954 radio series) =

- Genre: Radio drama
- Country of origin: United Kingdom
- Home station: BBC Light Programme (UK); NBC (US)
- Starring: John Gielgud; Ralph Richardson
- Written by: John Keir Cross
- Directed by: Val Gielgud
- Produced by: Harry Alan Towers
- Original release: 1954 – 1955
- No. of episodes: 16

The Adventures of Sherlock Holmes was a radio drama series adapted from the Sherlock Holmes stories by Sir Arthur Conan Doyle. A British-American co-production, it aired on the BBC Light Programme in the UK, and on the NBC network in the US.

British actors John Gielgud and Ralph Richardson portrayed Holmes and Dr. Watson, and American filmmaker-actor Orson Welles guest starred as Professor Moriarty. The episodes were dramatised by John Keir Cross, directed by Gielgud's brother Val Gielgud (who also guest starred as Mycroft Holmes) and produced by Harry Alan Towers.

16 episodes were produced, although only 12 aired in Britain.

== Episodes ==
- Dr. Watson Meets Mr. Sherlock Holmes (adapted from A Study in Scarlet and Charles Augustus Milverton, also titled "Charles Augustus Milverton", "The Blackmailer" and "The First Case") (BBC 5 October 1954 / NBC 2 January 1955)
  - Guest starring: Norman Claridge as Stamford, Philip Leaver as Milverton, Monica Grey as the woman, and John Cazabon as Inspector Lestrade
- A Scandal in Bohemia (BBC 12 October 1954 / NBC 9 January 1955)
  - Guest starring: Margaret Ward as Irene Adler and Olaf Pooley as the King of Bohemia
- The Red-Headed League (BBC 19 October 1954 / NBC 16 January 1955)
  - Guest starring: Stanley Groome as Jabez Wilson, Denis Goacher as Vincent Spaulding, Duncan McIntyre as Duncan Ross, Lewis Stringer as Inspector Athelney Jones, and Ivan Samson as Mr Merryweather
- The Bruce-Partington Plans (also titled "The Traitor") (BBC 26 October 1954 / NBC 6 February 1955)
  - Guest starring: Val Gielgud as Mycroft Holmes, John Cazabon as Inspector Lestrade, and William Fox as Colonel Valentine Walter
- A Case of Identity(also titled "The Gas-fitter's Ball") (BBC 2 November 1954 / NBC 23 January 1955)
  - Guest starring: Monica Grey as Mary Sutherland and Geoffrey Wincott as Hosmer Angel
- The Dying Detective (also titled "Rare Disease") (BBC 9 November 1954 / NBC 13 February 1955)
  - Guest starring: Anthony Jacobs as Culverton Smith, Elizabeth Maude as Mrs. Hudson, Frank Atkinson as Cabby, and Hugh Manning as Inspector Morton
- The Second Stain (BBC 16 November 1954 / NBC 30 January 1955)
  - Guest starring: Elizabeth Maude as Mrs. Hudson, Marjorie Mars as Lady Hilda Trelawney Hope, John Cazabon as Inspector Lestrade, Raf De La Torre as Lord Bellinger, Guy Verney as The Rt Hon Trelawney Hope, and Michael Finlayson as Constable MacPherson
- The Norwood Builder (BBC 23 November 1954 / NBC 20 February 1955)
  - Guest starring: Arthur Lawrence as John Hector McFarlane, Jean Stuart as Mrs McFarlane, and Arthur Ridley as Jonas Oldacre
- The Solitary Cyclist (BBC 30 November 1954 / NBC 27 February 1955)
  - Guest starring: Marjorie Westbury as Miss Violet Smith, John Bushelle as Carruthers, John Carson as Woodley, and Malcolm Hayes as Williamson
- The Six Napoleons (BBC 7 December 1954 / NBC 6 March 1955)
  - Guest starring: John Cazabon as Inspector Lestrade, with other parts played by Robert Rietti and Denis Goacher
- The Blue Carbuncle (BBC 14 December 1955 / NBC 13 March 1955)
  - Guest starring: John Carson as Peterson, James Thomason as Henry Baker, Charles Leno as Breckinridge, and Alan Reid as Ryder
- The Final Problem (BBC 21 December 1954 / NBC 17 April 1955)
  - Guest starring: Orson Welles as Professor Moriarty

=== US only ===
- The Speckled Band (NBC 20 March 1955)
- Silver Blaze (NBC 27 March 1955)
- The Golden Pince-Nez (also titled "Yoxley Old Place" and "The Yoxley Case") (NBC 3 April 1955)
- The Empty House (NBC 24 April 1955)
