= Incident at Victoria Falls =

1991 television film directed by Bill Corcoran

- Genre: Adventure; Crime; Drama
- Based on: Characters by Sir Arthur Conan Doyle
- Directed by: Bill Corcoran
- Starring: Christopher Lee; Patrick Macnee; Jenny Seagrove; Joss Ackland; Richard Todd
- Composer: Eric Allaman
- Original language: English

Production
- Producers: Frank Agrama; Riccardo Coccia; Daniele Lorenzano; Mirjana Mijojlic; Alessandro Tasca; Harry Alan Towers
- Cinematography: Rod Stewart
- Editors: Jane Morrison; Corinne Villa
- Running time: 180 minutes
- Production companies: Harmony Gold Finance Luxembourg S.A. (as Harmony Gold), Banquet et Caisse D'Epargne de l'etat, Banque Paribas Luxembourg, Silvio Berlusconi Communications (in association with)

Original release
- Release: 12 January 1992

Incident at Victoria Falls (also known as Sherlock Holmes and the Incident at Victoria Falls and Sherlock Holmes: The Star of Africa) is the 1992 sequel to Sherlock Holmes and the Leading Lady, and the second and final film in the proposed series of television films Sherlock Holmes the Golden Years written by Bob Shayne. It starred Christopher Lee and Patrick Macnee as Holmes and Watson in old age. Watson mentions that he is in his mid-50s and twice says he is getting too old for this sort of adventure. Both Lee and Macnee were 69 years old when this series was filmed. This does not, however, prevent Lee and fellow actor Claude Akins from achieving a remarkable stunt, sitting on the cowcatcher on the front of a moving steam train for several minutes of dialogue.

== Plot ==
In the film, Holmes is about to retire to Sussex and keep bees when King Edward (Joss Ackland) sends him on a mission to South Africa to retrieve the Star of Africa diamond. Complications arise and Holmes meets several historical people including ex-President Theodore Roosevelt (Claude Akins), and Lillie Langtry (Jenny Seagrove). He also encounters the fictional character A. J. Raffles.

== Cast ==
- Christopher Lee as Sherlock Holmes
- Patrick Macnee as Dr. John Watson
- Jenny Seagrove as Lillie Langtry
- Joss Ackland as King Edward
- Richard Todd as Lord Roberts
- Claude Akins as Theodore Roosevelt
- John Indi as Khumalo
- Margaret John as Mrs. Hudson
- Jerome Willis as Mycroft Holmes
- Steven Gurney (credited as Stephen Gurney) as Gugliamo Marconi
- Sunitha Singh as the Maharani
- Anthony Fridjhon as Constantine Mavropolis
- Claudia Udy as Amelia Roosevelt Morrison
- Neil McCarthy as Capt. James Morrison / Col. Morrison
- Alan Coates as Stanley I. Bullard / A. J. Raffles
