= Sherlock Holmes and the Leading Lady =

1991 television film directed by Peter Sasdy

- Based on: Characters by Sir Arthur Conan Doyle
- Screenplay by: Bob Shayne; H.R.F. Keating
- Directed by: Peter Sasdy
- Starring: Christopher Lee; Patrick Macnee; Morgan Fairchild; John Bennett; Engelbert Humperdinck
- Music by: Detto Mariano
- Original language: English

Production
- Producers: Frank Agrama; Riccardo Coccia; Daniele Lorenzano; Mirjana Mijojlic; Alessandro Tasca; Harry Alan Towers
- Cinematography: Brian West
- Editor: Marcus Manton
- Running time: 187 minutes
- Production companies: Harmony Gold Finance Luxembourg S.A. (as Harmony Gold), Banque et Caisse d’Épargne de l’État, Banque Paribas Luxembourg, Silvio Berlusconi Communications

Original release
- Release: 6 December 1991

Sherlock Holmes and the Leading Lady and its sequel, Incident at Victoria Falls (1992), are a pair of TV films made in 1991 under the banner Sherlock Holmes the Golden Years. Harry Alan Towers was executive producer and Bob Shayne was the writer on both.

== Plot ==
Sherlock Holmes and Doctor Watson are elderly gentlemen in 1910 Vienna. Both are involved independently with foiling Balkan terrorists. They reunite by chance with “The Woman”: actress Irene Adler. They save Emperor Franz Joseph I of Austria from an assassination at the opera house and thus delay the onset of World War I.

The film also featured a number of historical characters, including Eliot Ness and Sigmund Freud.

== Cast ==
- Christopher Lee as Sherlock Holmes
- Patrick Macnee as Dr. Watson
- Morgan Fairchild as Irene Adler
- John Bennett as Dr. Sigmund Freud
- Engelbert Humperdinck as Eberhardt Bohm
- Tom Lahm as Eliot Ness
- Jenny Quayle as Lady Violet Cholmondley
- Jerome Willis as Mycroft Holmes
- Margaret John as Mrs. Hudson
- Charlotte Attenborough as Margaret Froelich
- Kevin Quarmby as Kosich, the Bosnian terrorist

== Production ==
It was initially announced that there would be an eight-hour miniseries entitled The Golden Years of Sherlock Holmes. The project series of eight one-hour episodes soon morphed into two three-hour films.

=== Filming ===
It was shot back to back with Incident at Victoria Falls.

=== Locations ===
Filming locations were in Austria, London and Luxembourg.

== Home media ==
Both were released in the next two years and there were drastically edited versions released by Vestron Videos. The full versions are now available on DVD.
