= Sherlock Holmes pastiches =

Sherlock Holmes has long been a popular character for pastiche, Holmes-related work by authors and creators other than Arthur Conan Doyle. Their works can be grouped into four broad categories:

- New Sherlock Holmes stories;
- Stories in which Holmes appears in a cameo role;
- Stories about imagined descendants of Sherlock Holmes;
- Stories inspired by Sherlock Holmes but which do not include Holmes himself.

== Sherlock Holmes stories ==
New Sherlock Holmes stories fall into many categories, including:

- Additional Sherlock Holmes stories in the conventional mould;
- Holmes placed in settings of contemporary interest (such as World War II or the future);
- Crossover stories in which Holmes is pitted against other fictional characters (for example, vampires);
- Explorations of unusual aspects of Holmes' character which are hinted at in Conan Doyle's works (e.g., drug use).

=== Print ===
In 1913, the Greek novel Sherlock Holmes saving Mr. Venizelos (Ο Σέρλοκ Χολμς σώζων τον κ. Βενιζέλον) was serialized in the magazine Hellas. Written by an anonymous author, it describes Holmes' attempts to save Eleftherios Venizelos from a Bulgarian organization's assassination plot during the London Conference of 1912–13. It is considered the first detective novel of Greek literature.

Vincent Starrett's 1920 short story The Adventure of the Unique "Hamlet" sees Holmes investigating a missing 1602 edition of the titular play.

In January 1928, the short story "My Dear Holmes" was published in Punch, or the London Charivari. The sub-title of the story was: "His positively last appearance on earth." Written from the point of view of Holmes, it starts out in the usual way, and then ends rather lamely with no mystery presented or solved, but Holmes dead of incautiously (and improbably) sniffing excessively at a bottle of an anesthetic ("A.C.E.") he has asked Watson to bring with them on an errand.

In 1942, a short story entitled "The Case of the Man Who Was Wanted" was discovered by a Conan Doyle biographer, Hesketh Pearson, while searching through a trunk full of Doyle family papers. It was published in 1947 as a "lost" story written by Conan Doyle, but it was eventually discovered by Pearson that the story was originally written in 1914 by Arthur Whitaker, who had sent it to Doyle in hope of a collaboration. Doyle had bought the story from the author, in case he might use the ingenious plot at a later date, but never did.

In 1944, American mystery writers Frederic Dannay and Manfred B. Lee (writing under their joint pseudonym Ellery Queen) published The Misadventures of Sherlock Holmes, a collection of thirty-three pastiches written by various well-known authors including Agatha Christie, Mark Twain and Anthony Boucher.

In 1947, noted theologian and mystery writer Ronald A. Knox penned The Adventure of the First Class Carriage. It was published in the pages of The Strand Magazine where many of the original Holmes stories had first been printed.

Arthur Conan Doyle's son, Adrian Conan Doyle, wrote—in a joint effort with John Dickson Carr—12 Sherlock Holmes short stories that were published under the title The Exploits of Sherlock Holmes in 1954.

The Crown Prince of Siam, the future King Vajiravudh created the character Nai Thong-in and his side-kick the lawyer Mr. Wat, and published them in Thai in 1904-1905. Vajiravudh borrowed ideas from Sherlock Holmes in the creation of his mystery stories.

Using his alternate name of H.F. Heard, Gerald Heard wrote three novels about a reclusive beekeeper in the English countryside who goes by the name of Mycroft; he is clearly intended to be Sherlock Holmes, but the books were written before the Doyle estate gave permission for other writers to use the name. The three stories are A Taste for Honey, Reply Paid and The Notched Hairpin. A Taste for Honey was adapted for American TV in 1955 as "Sting of Death," with Boris Karloff as Mr. Mycroft.

American novelist and filmmaker Nicholas Meyer has written six Holmes novels: The Seven-Per-Cent Solution (1974), The West End Horror (1976), The Canary Trainer (1993), The Adventure of the Peculiar Protocols (2019), and The Return of the Pharaoh (2021), and Sherlock Holmes and the Telegram from Hell (2024).

In 1977, the novel Exit Sherlock Holmes: The Great Detective's Final Days by Robert Lee Hall was published and featured an exploration of Holmes' origins with a science fiction twist. In this account Holmes and Moriarty are revealed to be from the future.

Randall Collins published in 1978 The Case of the Philosophers' Ring, under the pseudonym Dr. John H. Watson, with Holmes' services requested at Cambridge, around 1914, by Bertrand Russell, and meeting the Cambridge Apostles (Moore, Hardy, Keynes...) Virginia Woolf, Lytton Strachey, Annie Besant and of course, Aleister Crowley as a perfect villain.

Michael Dibdin's novel The Last Sherlock Holmes Story (1979) confronts a somewhat psychopathic Sherlock Holmes with the crimes of Jack the Ripper, whom Holmes suspects to be Professor James Moriarty. Raymond Smullyan wrote The Chess Mysteries of Sherlock Holmes (1979), in which Holmes (with Watson) applies retrograde analysis to solve chess problems.

The detective novelist Loren D. Estleman wrote several short stories and two novels featuring Holmes; the novels pit the detective against Count Dracula and Dr. Jekyll and Mr. Hyde, respectively. The former was adapted for radio by the BBC.

Cay Van Ash wrote the novel Ten Years Beyond Baker Street: Sherlock Holmes matches wits with the diabolical Dr. Fu Manchu (1984), set in 1914, in which the apparently retired detective comes into conflict with Sax Rohmer's villainous master criminal.

Canadian writer Ron Weyman published three novels between 1989 and 1994 which imagined Sherlock Holmes as being sent to Canada at the behest of Albert Edward, Prince of Wales and investigating crimes there.

Holmes aficionado Stephen Fry wrote a short story featuring Holmes, "The Adventure of the Laughing Jarvey", in which Holmes and Watson encounter a great Victorian writer and are engaged on a mission to recover a lost manuscript. It includes introductory text claiming the tale itself to be a long-lost manuscript, which modern analysis has shown to use linguistic style and grammar typical of Watson. The story appears in Fry's collection of journalism and early writings, Paperweight (1992). In Stephen King's short story "The Doctor's Case" (1993), Holmes's alleged allergy to cats prevents him for once from solving the problem quicker than Watson. Barrie Roberts penned a series of Holmes pastiches, including Sherlock Holmes and the Man from Hell and Sherlock Holmes and the Railway Maniac from 1994 until his death in 2007. O Xangô de Baker Street (1995) tells the comic story of Sherlock Holmes's visit to Brazil, invited by the Emperor Dom Pedro II, to solve the disappearance of a Stradivarius violin which becomes a hunt for a serial killer. Larry Millett has written six books and a short story featuring Holmes solving mysteries in Minnesota. Michael Mallory has written more than two dozen short stories and two novels featuring "Amelia Watson," the second wife of Dr. Watson. These are not pastiches so much as original detective stories that view Holmes and Watson from a different and somewhat humorous point of view. Colin Bruce's The Strange Case of Mrs. Hudson's Cat: And Other Science Mysteries Solved by Sherlock Holmes (1997) and Conned Again, Watson!: Cautionary Tales of Logic, Maths and Probability (2001) are books of Sherlock Holmes stories in which Holmes uses scientific and mathematical approaches respectively to solve mysteries. The Mandala of Sherlock Holmes: The Missing Years (1999), by Tibetan author Jamyang Norbu is an account of Holmes's adventures in India and Tibet where, posing as Sigerson, he meets the Dalai Lama and Huree Chunder Mookerjee, a character from Rudyard Kipling's novel Kim.

The collection Shadows Over Baker Street (2003) contains 14 stories by 20 authors pitting Holmes against the forces of the Cthulhu Mythos. Among them is Neil Gaiman's "A Study in Emerald", which won the 2004 Hugo Award for Best Short Story. The title is a play on A Study in Scarlet. The narrator, never named (but whose initials in the end point him to be the criminal henchman of James Moriarty, Sebastian Moran; his tour in Afghanistan point to this as well), meets the protagonist (who is also never named, but likely Moriarty himself in a role-reversal, making him the detective and Holmes the criminal) under similar circumstances to the meeting of Holmes and Watson in A Study in Scarlet, even down to the deduction that the narrator has recently been in Afghanistan. The protagonist is tall and thin, a detective, chemist, and master of disguise. However, as the narrator and his friend investigate a murder of one of the Royal Family (shown to be the Great Old Ones of the Cthulhu Mythos) the murderer is revealed to be a tall, thin, pipe-smoking man, going by the name Sherry Vernet (a reference to the first name Sherlock, or possibly Conan Doyle's earlier "Sherrinford", and the last name of Holmes' grandmother). He is assisted by a "limping doctor", later tentatively identified as John (or possibly James) Watson. "Vernet" also had gone by the name Sigerson. Inspector Lestrade also appears in the story. Gaiman has also written a short story called "The Case of Death and Honey", which was featured in "A Study in Sherlock" and "Trigger Warning."

Michael Chabon wrote The Final Solution in 2004. This book, which received favorable reviews, deals with an elderly Sherlock Holmes, referred to only as 'the old man,' solving the case of the missing parrot belonging to a nine-year-old Jewish refugee boy from Germany. While readily solving the mystery, 'the old man' and the rest of the characters in the novella fail to see what the parrot's incessant muttering of random German numbers really means.

Caleb Carr was approached to pen a tale for the anthology Ghosts of Baker Street. Carr's short story grew to become a full length novel which became 2005's The Italian Secretary. An example of a Sherlock Holmes pastiche is found in The Curse of the Nibelung: A Sherlock Holmes Mystery (2005) by Sam North, which is currently in reprint. It finds Holmes at the very end of his career, together with a geriatric Watson, sent by Winston Churchill to Nazi Germany to help uncover a terrible secret. Elemental, querido Chaplin, by Rafael Marín (2005, Minotauro, Barcelona, ISBN 84-450-7542-X), is presented as a false document unpublished manuscript in which Charles Chaplin tells how, as a London poor child, he helped Sherlock Holmes in an adventure against Dr. Fu Manchu. Nick Rennison's 2006 Sherlock Holmes: The Unauthorized Biography is a "biography" of the detective much like William S. Baring-Gould's earlier Sherlock Holmes of Baker Street: A Life of the World's First Consulting Detective.

Mitch Cullin's novel A Slight Trick of the Mind (2005) takes place two years after the end of the Second World War and explores the character of Sherlock Holmes (now 93) as he comes to terms with a life spent in emotionless logic. Now old and frail, his once-steel trap mind begins to fail him as he loses items and forgets whole parts of his day. The story follows Holmes both at his home where he now tends bees in quiet retirement, as well as a vacation in Japan where he observes their post-war society first-hand. The novel is also interspersed with chapters from Holmes's's own book that reveal a fleeting moment of love that even he does not yet realise. It was adapted into the film Mr. Holmes starring Ian McKellen. The film released in 2015.

Manly W. Wellman's Sherlock Holmes' War of the Worlds combined the elements of Holmes canon with H. G. Wells's science fiction classic The War of the Worlds and describes Holmes' and Watson's adventures in the Martian-occupied London (in passing, the book also asserts that Holmes had a long-lasting romantic relationship with Mrs. Hudson, but the puritanical Dr. Watson never noticed it).

Laurie R. King recreates Sherlock Holmes in her Mary Russell series (starting with The Beekeeper's Apprentice), set during World War I and the 1920s. Her Holmes is (semi-)retired in Sussex, where he gradually trains a teenage Russell as his apprentice. The series includes 19 full length novels, a short story tie-in with a book from her Kate Martinelli series, The Art of Detection, and a series of short stories bound together in an anthology (Mary Russell's War).

Another story which pits Holmes and Watson against Jack the Ripper is Lyndsay Faye's Dust and Shadow (2009).

In Robert Wilton's 'The Adventure of the Distracted Thane', Holmes investigates the assassination of King Duncan I of Scotland, previously explored by William Shakespeare in Macbeth (which itself, according to this interpretation, featured Dr. Watson).

For younger readers, Shane Peacock has written The Boy Sherlock Holmes series. Andy Lane begun a young adult series of Sherlock Holmes adventures with the publication of Death Cloud in 2010. This series is the first authorized series of teenage adventures. Alberto López Aroca wrote "El problema de la pequeña cliente", a short story included in the book Nadie lo sabrá nunca (2004), where Sherlock Holmes meets Mary Poppins.

The Conan Doyle estate commissioned Anthony Horowitz, author of the Alex Rider novels The Power of Five and TV's Foyle's War, to write a new, uniquely authorised Sherlock Holmes novel. Published by Orion Books in 2011 under the title The House of Silk, the content and title were a "closely guarded secret" before publication.

Japanese mystery author Keisuke Matsuoka published Sherlock Holmes: A Scandal in Japan in 2017, exploring the time between Holmes' alleged death at Reichenbach Falls and his reappearance three years later.

The Hong Kong series The Great Detective Sherlock Holmes includes books written by Lai Ho, using Arthur Conan Doyle's characters, as well as books with stories originally written by Doyle which were modified by Lai Ho.

Meg Stretch wrote The Blake Avon Files: The House On Dogwood Lane in 2024. It concerns a famous man who was cryogenically preserved in the year 1920, and was found and revived in 2022. When he wakes up, he has amnesia, and must solve the mystery of who he is and why he was preserved.

=== TV ===
John Cleese played Sherlock Holmes opposite Willie Rushton as Dr. Watson in the Comedy Playhouse episode "Elementary, My Dear Watson: The Strange Case of the Dead Solicitors" (aired 18 January 1973 on the BBC).

The BBC's TV series Sherlock re-imagines Holmes and Watson (played by Benedict Cumberbatch and Martin Freeman) as contemporary figures, with Watson publishing his accounts of Holmes' exploits online.

The American TV series Elementary features a modern Holmes (Jonny Lee Miller) who lives in the United States, where he is assisted by Dr. Joan Watson (Lucy Liu).

The 2014 NHK puppetry Sherlock Holmes is set in a fictional boarding school "Beeton School" and Holmes and Watson are pupils who live in 221B of Baker House. There is no murder and the same characters appear many times.

HBO Asia's 2018 series Miss Sherlock is set in modern-day Japan, starring Yuko Takeuchi as the titular character, with Shihori Kanjiya as 'Wato'.

=== Audio ===
Bert Coules penned The Further Adventures of Sherlock Holmes starring Clive Merrison as Holmes and Andrew Sachs as Watson. The episodes of The Further Adventures were based on throwaway references in Doyle's short stories and novels. He also produced original scripts for this series, which was also issued on CD. Coules had previously dramatised the entire Holmes canon for Radio Four.

BBC Radio 2 also broadcast in 1999 a more ribald six-episode parody series featuring Holmes and Watson titled The Newly Discovered Casebook of Sherlock Holmes starring Roy Hudd as Holmes ("the brilliant detective, master of disguise and toffee-nosed ponce"), Chris Emmett as Watson ("contributor to the British Medical Journal, Which Stethescope Magazine and inventor of the self-raising thermometer") and June Whitfield as Mrs. Hudson. Titles in this series included "The Case of the Clockwork Fiend", "The Mystery of the Obese Escapologist", "The Case of the Deranged Botanist", "Sherlock Holmes and the Glorious Doppelganger", "Holmes Strikes a Happy Medium" and "The Demon Cobbler of Greek Street", and usually turned out to have Holmes' mortal enemy Moriarty (Geoffrey Whitehead) behind each mystery. This series has since been re-broadcast on BBC Radio 7, later BBC Radio 4 Extra.

Starting in 1998, American radio producer Jim French was given permission from the Conan Doyle estate to produce new, original Sherlock Holmes stories for radio in North America. These are presented within the Imagination Theatre program on radio stations and XM satellite radio. The new stories are also broadcast under the banner The Further Adventures of Sherlock Holmes. John Gilbert played Holmes until 2000, when John Patrick Lowrie took over the role. Watson is played in all shows by Lawrence Albert. Scripts are by Jim French, M. J. Elliott, Matthew Booth, John Hall, Gareth Tilley, J R Campbell and Lawrence Albert. In 2005, with adaptations written by M. J. Elliott, French and his company began a new series based on Conan Doyle's original tales called The Classic Adventures of Sherlock Holmes. Many episodes are available on CD as well as downloadable from the Imagination Theatre website.

Since October of 2023, Goalhanger Podcasts has produced Sherlock & Co., an audio drama adaptation of the entire original Sherlock Holmes canon adapted to a modern day setting. They have since adapted the untold tale of Colonel Warburton’s madness mentioned in The Adventure of the Engineer's Thumb and built their own original stories. They have also started to adapt The Adventures of Sherlock Holmes in their original text in Audiobook format, though they have not actioned this in the same order as the books.

=== Film ===
Holmes has been an inspiration of both serious and comedy films.

==== Serious films ====
The Woman in Green (1945), starring Basil Rathbone as Holmes

A series of fourteen Sherlock Holmes films starring Basil Rathbone as Sherlock Holmes and Nigel Bruce as Dr. John Watson were released between 1939 and 1946. Many are loosely based on the original stories by Sir Arthur Conan Doyle and some are original stories. Those that pit Holmes and Watson against the Nazis, made during the Second World War, were in the spirit of Conan Doyle's patriotism, and indeed the quintessential "His Last Bow" describes Holmes and his connections with British Intelligence on the eve of the First World War.

A Study in Terror (1965), directed by James Hill starring John Neville as Holmes and Donald Houston as Watson, connected Holmes with the Jack the Ripper case, and was later novelised by Ellery Queen.

The Private Life of Sherlock Holmes (1970) was directed by Billy Wilder and stars Robert Stephens as the famous sleuth. In this film, Holmes travels to Scotland in search of the Loch Ness Monster.

The Seven-Per-Cent Solution (1976), based on Nicholas Meyer's very successful novel, concentrates on Holmes' cocaine addiction and stars Nicol Williamson and Robert Duvall as Holmes and Watson, respectively. Professor Moriarty (Laurence Olivier) is characterised here as an inoffensive mathematics tutor, his villainy a fantasy of Holmes' drug habit.

Sherlock Holmes in New York (1976 TV movie) starred Roger Moore as Holmes and Patrick Macnee as Watson.

Murder by Decree (1979) portrays Holmes (played by Christopher Plummer) and Watson (played by James Mason) tracking down Jack the Ripper and dealing with the violent political situation of the day. The theory of the Ripper murders presented in that film is similar to that portrayed in the comic book and film From Hell. Both are derived from Stephen Knight's book Jack the Ripper: The Final Solution (1977).

In 1985, director Barry Levinson made a film called Young Sherlock Holmes (a.k.a. Young Sherlock Holmes and the Pyramid of Fear) with a story about the youth of Holmes and Watson as secondary school students and their first great adventure, even before A Study in Scarlet. There are a lot of references about Holmes canon such as the violin, the pipe, "elementary, my dear...", the clothes and the reason why Holmes never married, and it includes the first meeting of Holmes and Professor Moriarty. The film was produced by Steven Spielberg and written by Chris Columbus; the novelization was written by Alan Arnold.

In both The Return of Sherlock Holmes (1987 TV movie) and Sherlock Holmes Returns (1993 TV movie) a cryogenically frozen Holmes is awakened in the present day.

Hands of a Murderer (1990 TV movie) sees Edward Woodward playing Holmes and John Hillerman (of Magnum, P.I. fame) as Watson, in a plot involving Mycroft (Peter Jeffrey) and Moriarty (Anthony Andrews) battling for control of government secrets.

Sherlock: Case of Evil (2002 TV movie) has James D'Arcy as a youthful, bed-hopping Holmes, meeting Roger Morlidge's Watson for the first time while pursuing Vincent D'Onofrio's Moriarty, whose opium-trading schemes have left Mycroft (Richard E. Grant) physically and mentally scarred.

The Case of the Whitechapel Vampire (2002 TV movie) stars Matt Frewer and Kenneth Welsh as Holmes and Watson investigating reports of vampire attacks in Whitechapel, East London. The film was preceded by adaptations of The Hound of the Baskervilles (2000 TV movie) and The Sign of Four (2001 TV movie).

Sherlock Holmes and the Case of the Silk Stocking (2004 TV movie), has Holmes (Rupert Everett) and Watson (Ian Hart) searching for a killer with a foot fetish. The production was an original story written by Allan Cubitt. This was preceded by The Hound of the Baskervilles (2002 TV movie) with Holmes now played by Richard Roxburgh and Ian Hart returning as Watson.

Sherlock Holmes (2009) was directed by Guy Ritchie for Warner Bros. and stars Robert Downey Jr. and Jude Law as Holmes and Watson. It also features Rachel McAdams as Irene Adler. The film explores Holmes and Watson's most complex adventure in which the antagonist Lord Blackwood (Mark Strong) seemingly rises from his grave after being executed and draws plans to control the British Empire. The sequel, Sherlock Holmes: A Game of Shadows (2011) pits the original cast against Professor Moriarty (played by Jared Harris).

Sir Arthur Conan Doyle's Sherlock Holmes (2010) was directed by Rachel Lee Gondenberg and produced by low-budget direct-to-DVD film company The Asylum. It stars Gareth David Lloyd as Watson and new actor Ben Syder as Holmes. The film placed a younger Holmes and Watson in a steampunk science fiction story set in 1881, in which Holmes and Watson investigate the crimes of a mechanical genius known as Spring Heeled Jack, who creates mechanical monsters to terrorise London.

==== Comedy films ====
Holmes' talents have sometimes been inverted for comic effect, as in Gene Wilder's 1975 film The Adventure of Sherlock Holmes' Smarter Brother. Here Holmes' younger brother Sigurson (Wilder), who is jealous of 'Sheer Luck' as he calls him, is manipulated by Holmes into solving one of his cases.

1988 brought Thom Eberhardt's role-reversal comedy Without a Clue. The film depicts Dr. Watson (Ben Kingsley) as the real detective genius and Holmes (Michael Caine) as a bumbling idiot who is merely an actor and a front man for Watson, with a plot which cleverly mirrors the real life circumstance of Conan Doyle (also a physician) who eventually tired of his creation, Sherlock Holmes.

Will Ferrell and John C. Reilly starred as the eponymous characters in the 2018 mystery comedy film Holmes & Watson.

=== Animation ===
The 1999 animated series Sherlock Holmes in the 22nd Century was set in the year 2103 and involved Beth Lestrade, a direct descendant of Holmes's associate Inspector Lestrade, reanimating the cryogenically preserved corpse of Holmes to battle Moriarty-later revealed to be a clone of the original-who was believed to be responsible for a series of crimes in New London. Watson was long dead, but a robotic counterpart was made to physically resemble him after downloading Watson's stories-and essentially his personality-into his databanks by accident, and the three solved a number of cases patterned on the original Holmes stories; for instance, a retelling of The Hound of the Baskervilles took place on the moon and involved werewolves. The series was created by DIC and Scottish Television, and ran for approximately two seasons. It was unique in Sherlockiana for a number of reasons, including the fact that Holmes, who is canonically described as having black hair and grey eyes, was depicted with blond hair and blue eyes.

Sherlock Hound (名探偵ホームズ Meitantei Hōmuzu?, lit. "Detective Holmes") is a 1984 anime television series based on Conan Doyle's work where almost all the characters are depicted as anthropomorphic dogs. The show featured regular appearances of Jules Verne-steampunk style technology, adding a 19th-century science-fiction atmosphere to the series. It was coproduced by Japanese and Italian companies and animated by TMS (Tokyo Movie Shinsha). Some episodes were directed by Hayao Miyazaki.

Holmes and Watson appear in the Batman: The Brave and the Bold episode "Trials of the Demon!", respectively voiced by Ian Buchanan and Jim Piddock. They work with Etrigan, Jason Blood, and Batman to clear Blood's name after he is mistakenly believed to have committed Jim Craddock's crimes. Upon encountering Batman, Holmes is able to deduce much about his nature, but is baffled when Batman recognizes him immediately; Holmes comes to see Batman as something of a rival as they attempt to uncover Craddock's plot. After the villain's defeat, Holmes sees Batman off; as Batman departs, he acknowledges Holmes as the "World's Greatest Detective".

The 2015 anime film The Empire of Corpses features a younger, re-imagined Holmes and Watson, the latter actually the protagonist, in a steampunk world where the dead are reanimated and used as a labor force.

=== Comics ===
In the Italian comic book Martin Mystère and spin-off series Storie di Altrove/Stories from Elsewhere Holmes is a historical character. In the late 1880s, he worked on the case of Jack the Ripper and met Professor Richard Van Helsing, a vampire who destroyed Count Dracula. Along with Professor Challenger, Holmes visited a secret valley of dinosaurs in South America in 1896, which became the basis for Doyle's novel The Lost World. The same year he worked with the American Secret Service "Elsewhere" to stop paranormal threats from another dimension. In 1910, he discovered a life extension serum. At the beginning of World War I, he had a final confrontation with Professor Moriarty. After the war, he moved to Ukraine, giving Arthur Conan Doyle the task to convince everyone that he was just an imaginary character. With the help of his serum, Holmes prolonged his life for several decades. In the 1990s, he indirectly helped Martin Mystère to capture a villain who found a formula of his serum.

Leah Moore and John Reppion's The Trial of Sherlock Holmes (2009) and Scott Beatty's Sherlock Holmes: Year One (2011) published by Dynamite Entertainment.

Ian Edginton wrote the 2010 Wildstorm comic book limited series Victorian Undead which pitted Holmes against zombies.

New Paradigm Studios in August 2012 debuted "Watson and Holmes" digital comic on iVerse ComicsPlus digital app. "Watson and Holmes" is a modern re-interpretation of Sherlock Holmes and Dr. John Watson as African-Americans in present day Harlem, NY. "Watson and Holmes" is in limited print black and white comics of the first three issues. Issue #1 will be in wide release July 2013.

The Korean manhwa series Lizzie Newton: Victorian Mysteries is set in 1864 and features younger versions of Sherlock Holmes characters. These include Inspector Lestrade as a junior police officer and Professor Moriarty as a student.

Moriarty the Patriot is a Japanese manga series by Ryōsuke Takeuchi and Hikaru Miyoshi, focused on Holmes' nemesis, William James Moriarty, but Sherlock is also a major character. This Moriarty is a crime consultant who, alongside his brothers, hopes to end the English class system and reform society. Sherlock becomes first his rival and then his friend.

An elderly Sherlock Holmes appears in the IDW comics series Godzilla's Monsterpiece Theatre, where he teams up with Jay Gatsby the time traveler and Jules Verne against Godzilla and Dracula.

=== Video games ===
Sherlock Holmes has taken the starring roles in a number of video games, officially licensed or not.

==== Text only ====
- Melbourne House released an interactive fiction adventure game for Commodore 64 and ZX Spectrum called Sherlock in 1984.
- Peter Allen Golden in 1984 published a Sherlock Holmes computer interactive novel Another Bow.
- Ellicott Creek Software in 1986 published Sherlock Holmes: The Vatican Cameos for ZX Spectrum and Apple II.
- Infocom released a text adventure game, Sherlock: The Riddle of the Crown Jewels, in 1987. The plot revolves around Moriarty's theft of the Crown Jewels days before the celebration of Queen Victoria's Golden Jubilee; Holmes rightly senses that a trap has been set for him and allows Watson to investigate the case.
- Pack-In-Video released in 1987 Young Sherlock: The Legacy of Doyle for the MSX, mostly a text adventure with some graphics. It is based on the 1985 film Young Sherlock Holmes, but the plot is different.
- Slovak Sybilasoft (Michal Hlaváč) created a text adventure for ZX Spectrum called Traja Garridebovia in 1987.
- British Creative Juices (David Court) in 1988 created a text adventure for ZX Spectrum called Sherlock Holmes: a Matter of Evil.
- British 8th Day Software in 1988 published a text adventure with some additional graphics created by Stephen Kee and Alan Bolger called The Raven for ZX Spectrum.
- Zenobi Software released two text-only adventure games for the ZX Spectrum: Sherlock Holmes: The Case of the Beheaded Smuggler in 1988 and Sherlock Holmes: The Lamberley Mystery in 1990.
- Mycroft Systems published a text-only adventure for MS-DOS in 1990 called The Adventures of Sherlock Holmes set in London and featuring Dr. Watson, Mrs. Baker and Inspector Lestrade.
- Yestersoft in 1991 published PC-Sherlock: a Game of Logic and Deduction, with very little graphics and focusing on logic aspects.

==== Graphic adventures ====
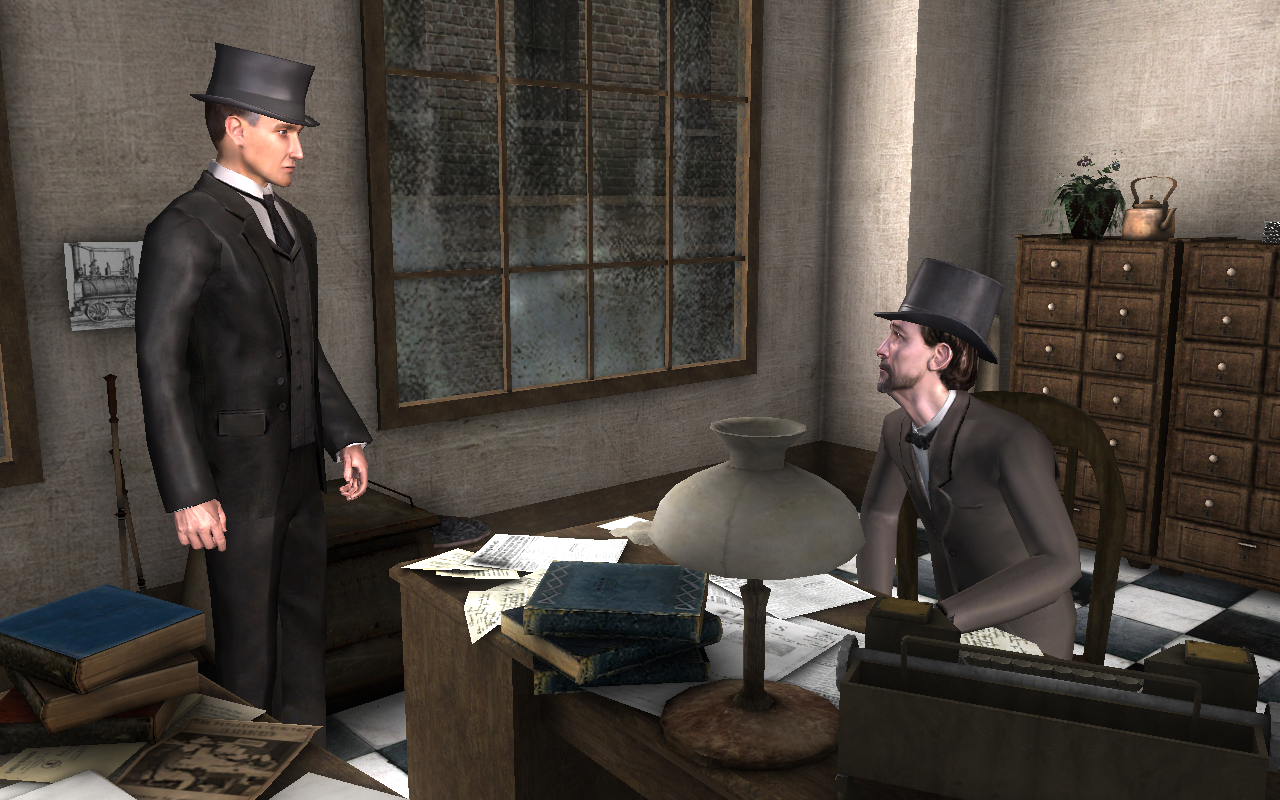
Holmes (left) in Frogwares' Sherlock Holmes Versus Jack the Ripper (2009)

- Datasoft released a graphic adventure game called 221B Baker St in 1986.
- Towa Chiki released three action-adventure games called Sherlock Holmes: Hakushaku Reijō Yūkai Jiken in 1986, Meitantei Holmes: Kiri no London Satsujin Jiken in 1988, and Meitantei Holmes: M-Kara no Chousenjou in 1989 only in Japan for the Nintendo Entertainment System.
- Sega in 1987 published a graphic adventure called Loretta no Shouzou: Sherlock Holmes ("The Portrait of Loretta") exclusively in Japan.
- ICOM Simulations released Sherlock Holmes: Consulting Detective, a multimedia CD-ROM adventure game for PCs in 1991 and later for the Sega CD system 1992, TurboGrafx-16 and Apple computers. One of the earliest multimedia titles, it was to become a series of three games, each with three cases. Each game in the series uses full motion video clips. A collected edition followed in 1993. A re-mastered version for iOS, Microsoft Windows, and OS X was released in 2012.
  - Sherlock Holmes: Consulting Detective Vol. II, ICOM, 1992.
  - Sherlock Holmes: Consulting Detective Vol. III, ICOM, 1993.
- Electronic Arts released two original games under the name The Lost Files of Sherlock Holmes: The Case of the Serrated Scalpel (1992) and The Case of the Rose Tattoo (1996).
- Frogwares developed Sherlock Holmes: Mystery of the Mummy, Sherlock Holmes: Secret of the Silver Earring and Sherlock Holmes: The Awakened, both marketed as "inspired by The Adventures of Sherlock Holmes", and released in 2004 and 2006, respectively. Frogwares also created Sherlock Holmes: Nemesis, released in 2008 and Sherlock Holmes Versus Jack the Ripper, released in 2009 and converted to play in the Xbox 360. In September 2012, Frogwares released The Testament of Sherlock Holmes for the Xbox 360, PlayStation 3, and Windows. Also in September 2014, Frogwares released Sherlock Holmes: Crimes & Punishments and in 2016 Sherlock Holmes: The Devil's Daughter. These eight games comprises the Adventures of Sherlock Holmes video game series. In addition to them, Frogwares released also four casual games: Sherlock Holmes: The Mystery of the Persian Carpet, Sherlock Holmes and the Mystery of Osborne House, Sherlock Holmes and the Hound of the Baskervilles, and Sherlock Holmes: The Mystery of the Frozen City.
- Three games have been inspired by movies Sherlock Holmes and Sherlock Holmes: A Game of Shadows directed by Guy Ritchie: Gameloft S. A. published in 2009 Sherlock Holmes: The Official Movie Game for Java, Warner Bros. developed Sherlock Holmes Mysteries for iOS, and Sticky Game Studios released in 2011 an online game called Sherlock Holmes 2: Checkmate.
- The Great Ace Attorney: Adventures, a video game on the Nintendo 3DS and a spin-off of the Ace Attorney series, features Sherlock Holmes as a major supporting character, aided by protagonist Ryunosuke Naruhodo to solve a mysterious case. He is accompanied by Iris Watson, a 10-year-old girl genius and purported daughter of Dr. Watson. Holmes and Iris also appear in the game's sequel, The Great Ace Attorney 2: Resolve. Due to copyright concerns, the characters' names are localized in international releases to Herlock Sholmes and Iris Wilson, in homage to Holmes' renaming in the Arsène Lupin stories.
- The Lost Cases of Sherlock Holmes and The Lost Cases of Sherlock Holmes 2 (also called The Lost Cases of 221B Baker St.), two casual games by Legacy Interactive with 16 new cases each (mostly hidden objects scenes) with Holmes and Watson. The cases of the first games are "The Zouch Emerald", "The Assassinated Aerialist", "Murder in the Third Act", "The Purloined Painting", "The Suspicious Sting", "The Death Card Devil", "The Wayward Will", "The Curse of Anan Thotep", "The Mystery of the Billiard Blackmailer", "A Duchess' Diamonds", "The Maestro's Violin", "The Porcelain Dragon", "The Docklands Spy", "The Vanishing Actress", "King Arthur's Arrow", and "The Eight Clocks Assassin", plus a bonus game in Holmes' chemistry laboratory. The cases of the second game are "Slaying at the Standing Stones", "The Harbor Pirates Prisoner", "The Curious Chrononaut", "The Return of Jack the Ripper", "The Lost Blade of Calcutta", "The Murdered Musician", "The Vulnerable Pugilist", "The Haunting at Marlsbury Castle", "The Pups of Baskerville", "The Tainted Truffle", "The Case of the Unwanted Suitor", "The Secret of the Father Christmas Club", "The Sticky-Fingered Dinner Guest", "The Disappearing Doomsday Formula", "The Mystery of the Millionaire's Daughter", and "The Bohemian Crown Heist", plus four bonus stories.
- Sherlock Holmes: The Case of the Time Machine (also released as Cerebral Sherlock) and Sherlock Holmes: The Case of the Vanishing Thief, two comedy adventures for children by Green Street, Anuman Interactive, gameX and Compedia. The playing character here is Watson, but Holmes is also present, as well as Sergeant Plymouth. Watson has to catch "the biggest criminal of all time", Jailhouse Jimmy. No clear license on the packaging.

==== Apps ====
- G5 Entertainment has released in 2020 a free-to-play game called Sherlock: Hidden Match-3 Cases, featuring Holmes and Watson.

== Sherlock Holmes cameos ==
=== Print ===
According to The Alternative Sherlock Holmes: Pastiches, Parodies, and Copies by Peter Ridgway Watt and Joseph Green, the first known period pastiche dates from 1893. Titled "The Late Sherlock Holmes", it came from the pen of Doyle's close friend, J. M. Barrie, who was to create Peter Pan a decade later. The police are apprised of the death of Holmes and believe that Dr. Watson has killed him because of a disagreement about money. However, Holmes turns out to be alive and, although it is not made clear, Watson is presumably released.

In 1902 Mark Twain painted an unflattering portrait of Holmes and his methods of deduction in his A Double Barrelled Detective Story. In the short story, set at a mining camp in California, Fetlock Jones, a nephew of Sherlock Holmes, kills his master, a silver-miner, by blowing up his cabin. Since this occurs when Holmes happens to be visiting, he brings his skills to bear upon the case and arrives at logically worked conclusions that are proved abysmally wrong by an amateur detective with an extremely keen sense of smell which he employs in solving the case. Perhaps this ought to be seen as yet another piece where Twain tries to prove that life does not quite follow logic.

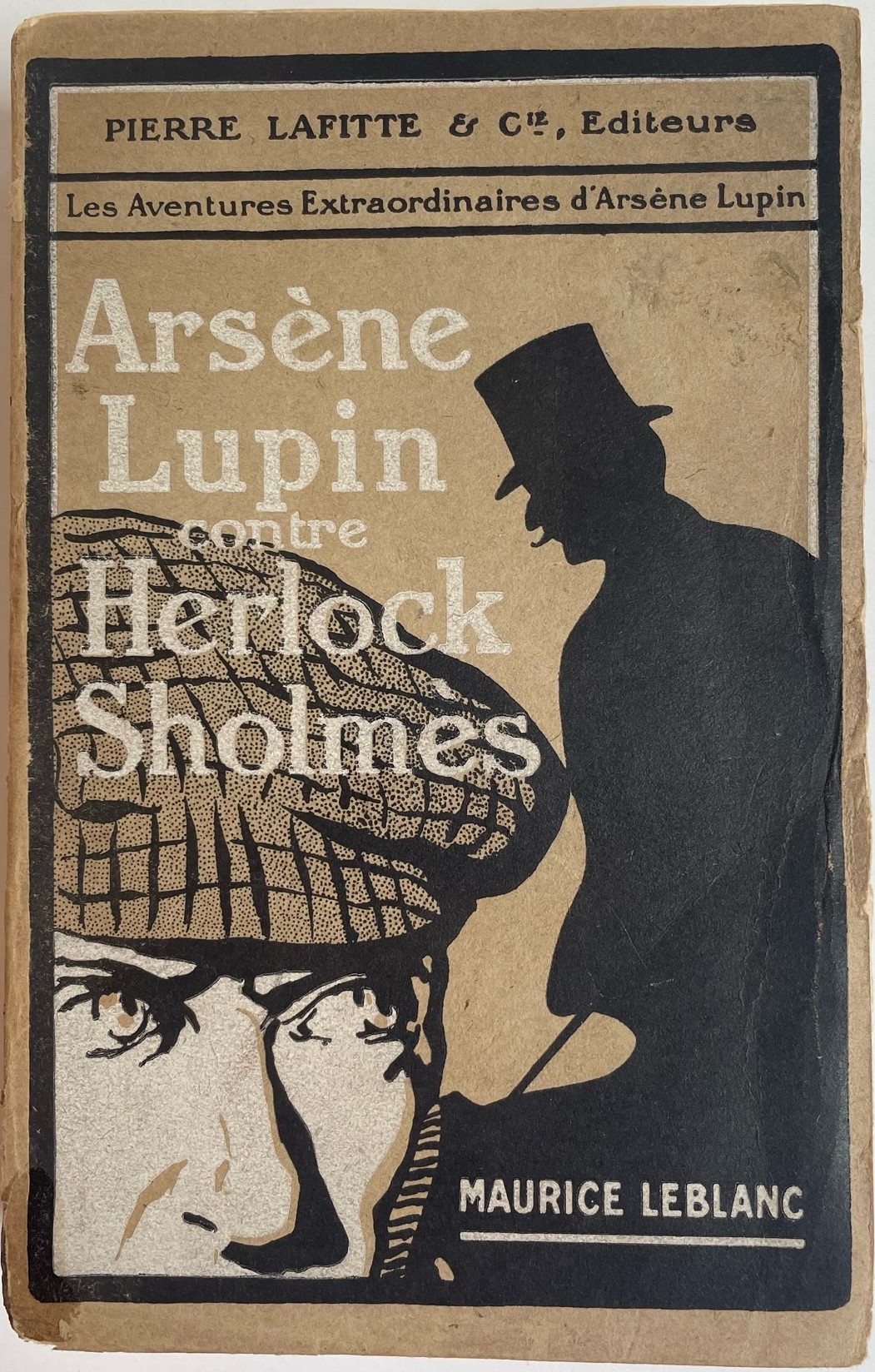
Arsène Lupin versus Herlock Sholmes by Maurice Leblanc

In 1905 the French writer Maurice Leblanc pitted his gentleman burglar Arsène Lupin against Holmes in a story called Sherlock Holmes arrive trop tard (Sherlock Holmes Arrives Too Late), the first of four in the Lupin series. Copyright concerns at the time forced Holmes to be renamed "Herlock Sholmes" or "Holmlock Shears", and Watson to be renamed "Wilson", in subsequent appearances. However, in many modern editions, the names have reverted to the original.

In 1910, the French writer Arnould Galopin teamed up his detective Allan Dickson, the Australian Sherlock Holmes with an aging Holmes renamed Herlokolms who had been much impressed by the young man's early exploits in L'Homme au Complet Gris (The Man in Grey). Allan Dickson may have been the prototype for Harry Dickson (see #Successors of Sherlock Holmes, below).

Another French writer, Théodore Botrel, wrote the play Le Mystère de Kéravel in 1932 in which Holmes, travelling incognito in Brittany, solves a murder at the request of local police, who know his true identity. He is referred to as L'étranger in the list of characters, but named in the text.

Several characters from the canon appear in Alan Moore's comic book series The League of Extraordinary Gentlemen, in which various characters from Victorian fiction are recruited to serve the interests of an alternate-history British Empire. Holmes himself appears only in a flashback during the first series, as he is still presumed dead. Mycroft has a more substantial role in the second series. References in the series suggest Sherlock was a member of an earlier iteration of the League. Moriarty also figures into the first series and the film adaptation. Holmes also makes a minor but significant appearance in Warren Ellis and John Cassaday's comic book series Planetary.

Michael P. Hodel and Sean M. Wright presented a mystery-adventure Enter the Lion: A Posthumous Memoir of Mycroft Holmes (1979) in which Sherlock's older brother prevents a conspiracy involving a return of the American "colonies" to Great Britain. Sherlock makes appearances with Victor Trevor (from "The Adventure of the Gloria Scott"), Professor Moriarty, and Moriarty's father.

Carole Nelson Douglas has written a spin-off series centring upon Holmes' nemesis Irene Adler. The first book is titled Good Night, Mr. Holmes and takes place concurrently with A Scandal in Bohemia. While Irene Adler is the main character, Sherlock Holmes plays a role in every book in the series.

Michael Mallory has written a series of short stories and one novel (Murder in the Bath) about the second wife of Doctor Watson, here named "Amelia Watson." Holmes appears in several of the stories as a semi-antagonistic foil for Amelia—a detective who is in reality slightly less than infallible, but who has been made to appear so to the public through Watson's writings.

In Kim Newman's alternate history novel Anno Dracula, set in a world where Dracula becomes the monarch of Britain, Holmes is one of the prominent "warms" to protest against the new order. The vampire government of Lord Ruthven in turn imprisons him in a concentration camp in Devil's Dyke, Sussex.

Holmes and Watson appear briefly in George MacDonald Fraser's short story Flashman and the Tiger (1999), which appears in the collection of that name. The events there are consistent with those of the canonical story The Adventure of the Empty House, which takes place in 1894. Holmes sees Flashman disguised as a tramp and draws a series of conclusions about him which are all wrong.

Holmes and Watson also appear in Alan Coren's children's books, Arthur and the Great Detective and Arthur and the Bellybutton Diamond. The titular Arthur is an erstwhile Baker Street Irregular.

In 1993 the psychologist Keith Oatley wrote The Case of Emily V., a novel in which Sigmund Freud, Watson and Sherlock Holmes turn out to be investigating the same person. This book won the 1994 Commonwealth Writers Prize for Best First Novel. In Oatley's book the reader finds out the "real truth" behind Freud's case notes on Emily V.

In the Doctor Who Virgin New Adventures novel All-Consuming Fire by Andy Lane the Time Lord meets Holmes and Watson while investigating a recent theft from the Library of St. John the Beheaded, revealed to be the work of Holmes's unknown eldest brother Sherringford (sic), Holmes in the end being forced to kill Sherringford (sic) to save Watson. They are later amongst numerous characters from the series who attend Bernice Summerfield's wedding in Happy Endings by Paul Cornell. Holmes also features in the Faction Paradox novel Erasing Sherlock by Kelly Hale and in the novelette The Shape of Things by Stuart Douglas in the Iris Wildthyme collection Miss Wildthyme and Friends Investigate. Mycroft Holmes, Dr John Watson and Professor George Challenger also appear in the same book.

Boris Akunin's short story The Prisoner of the Tower, or A Short But Beautiful Journey of Three Wise Men in the Jade Rosary Beads compilation describes Holmes and Erast Fandorin's race to thwart a devious extortion plan by Arsène Lupin.

Author Nancy Springer has written a series of novels of the adventures of Enola Holmes, the much younger teenage sister of Sherlock and Mycroft. Upon their mother's disappearance, Enola discovers that she in fact left of her own volition according to a carefully devised plan to live independently and raised her daughter with the skills to do the same if she chose to. Finding the resources her mother carefully hid for her, Enola decides to run away rather than be forced into boarding school by Mycroft. She eventually comes to London where she secretly sets herself up in business as a private investigator when she realises she is equally as talented at the profession as her older brother even as she is determined to elude his notice.

Holmes cameos at the end of Detective Comics #572, the comic series' 50th anniversary issue, helping Batman, Robin, The Elongated Man, and Slam Bradley tie up a case involving the descendants of both Dr. Watson and Professor Moriarty. Well over a century old now, Holmes attributes his longevity to "a proper diet, a certain distillation of royal jelly, developed in my beekeeping days, and the rarified (sic) atmosphere of Tibet, where I keep my primary residence." He apparently gave up tobacco, too, indicating that his pipe was now "purely for show these days."

Mercedes Lackey's Elemental Masters series is set in a world in which magic and psychic powers are real. Holmes and the Watsons appear in three of the books; Dr Watson is a Water Master, Mary is an Air Master, and Holmes is at first skeptical, dismissing their talk of magic as superstitious twaddle.

In Theodora Goss' 2017 novel, The Strange Case of the Alchemist's Daughter, the protagonist Mary Jekyll meets Holmes and Watson, and they help each other solve their respective mysteries, which happen to converge.

=== TV ===
In Star Trek: The Next Generation, a Sherlock Holmes mystery was one of the programmes on the Enterprise-D's holodeck. In the episode "Elementary, Dear Data", Data, after memorising all of the Sherlock Holmes books, is challenged to use deduction in an original mystery created by Dr. Pulaski. However, the programme goes awry when Geordi La Forge, in response to Pulaski's challenge, asks the computer to create an adversary capable of defeating Data, resulting in the hologram of Professor Moriarty (played by Daniel Davis) gaining full sentience, kidnapping Pulaski and taking over the ship's computer. In a later episode, "Ship in a Bottle", the holodeck Moriarty again takes control of the ship, insisting that a way be found for him to experience life beyond the confines of the holodeck, until the crew manage to trap him in a permanent simulation. The first Holmes-based episode was produced with the understanding that Sherlock Holmes was public domain, but a protest from the Doyle estate indicated otherwise. It is rumored that this also prevented a plan for Data-as-Holmes to become a recurring character.

An elderly Holmes and Watson appear in a sketch of comedy show That Mitchell and Webb Look, where Holmes is portrayed as an increasingly senile old man whose flawed deductions are merely humoured by Watson to try to make his old friend feel better; the sketch ends on a tearful note as Holmes, his mind briefly clear, admits to Watson that he knows that his powers are failing him but simply cannot think clearly enough to get past his age.

In 2020 Netflix released the film Enola Holmes based on the Nancy Springer character of the same name starring Millie Bobby Brown (Stranger Things) as the titular character and Henry Cavill as Sherlock Holmes. The cast also includes Helena Bonham Carter as Eudora Holmes and Sam Claflin as Mycroft Holmes. The film was originally set for theatrical distribution by Warner Bros. Pictures but the distribution rights were picked up by Netflix due to the COVID-19 pandemic. A sequel, Enola Holmes 2, was released in 2022 and a third Enola Holmes 3 in 2026.

=== Animation ===
- Disney's The Great Mouse Detective (1986), also known as Basil of Baker Street, was a relatively successful theatrical feature animated film based on the Basil of Baker Street books of Eve Titus, featuring a miniature subworld of London with mice, rats and cats in the lead roles. The title character is a mouse who lives in 221B Baker St and models his own detective career on Holmes, who lives at the same address and makes a cameo appearance.
- In one episode of The Fairly Oddparents Holmes is portrayed in stereotypical attire; he starts every sentence with "elementary, my dear (whomever he is addressing)" and will always know the answer to every single question posed to him about the asker.
- In the VeggieTales episode, Sheerluck Holmes and the Golden Ruler, Larry the Cucumber and Bob the Tomato portray vegetable versions of Holmes and Watson, respectively, in order to teach a lesson on friendship.

=== Video games ===
Everett Kaser has published a series of free reflection games (puzzles) with names referring to Sherlock Holmes stories: Sherlock: The Game of Logic, Dinner with Moriarty, Watson's Map, Baker Street, Scotland Yard Inspector Lestrade, Mrs. Hudson, Reichenbach Falls, Queen's Gambit, Mycroft's Map. Sherlock Holmes, however, does not appear in the games, except some very small icons.

In Midnight Mysteries: Haunted Houdini a hidden-object/puzzle video game released in 2012 by MumboJumbo, Sherlock Holmes is on the suspects list.

In Fate/Grand Order, released in Japan in 2015, Holmes briefly appears in the Camelot singularity. Then he appears in the Shinjuku singularity as an ally. He is a Ruler class servant.

In There Is No Game: Wrong Dimension, the second chapter sees the player trapped in a fictional adventure game based on Sherlock Holmes. The player must alter the game's user interface and environment in order to manipulate Holmes and Watson into solving specific puzzles so that they might escape.

== Successors of Sherlock Holmes ==
These stories treat Sherlock Holmes as an historical character but concern themselves with one of his successors – biological or spiritual – who usually take after him in some way, e.g. being good detectives.

=== Film ===
In the 1977 spoof The Strange Case of the End of Civilization as We Know It, John Cleese plays Arthur Sherlock Holmes, grandson of the famous sleuth, alongside Watson's grandson Dr. William Watson, played by Arthur Lowe.

=== TV ===
The Adventures of Shirley Holmes is the story of the teenage Anglo-Canadian grandniece of Sherlock Holmes, Shirley, who after discovering some of Sherlock Holmes' effects (which he had concealed to ensure that only a fitting successor of similar intellect would find them), goes on to solve many crimes and mysteries with the assistance of her male Watson-like friend, Bo Sawchuk. She also has a Moriarty-like arch-enemy in the form of Molly Hardy.

=== Manga/anime ===
In Hidan no Aria series, the character Aria Holmes Kanzake is the descendant of Sherlock Holmes. Tantei Opera Milky Holmes has four protagonists named after famous literary detectives, and they even adopt the iconic deerstalker into their uniform.

Ron Kamonohashi, the main character of Ron Kamonohashi: Deranged Detective, is a sixth-generation descendant of Sherlock Holmes, and a ninth-generation descendant of James Moriarty.

=== Video games ===
Big Fish Games and Elephant Games have released three games with a main character named "Ms. Holmes", a female detective who investigates in England during the absence of Sherlock Holmes after his disappearance at Reichenbach Falls. Some recurring Holmes' characters such as Professor Moriarty, Inspector Lestrade, and the Baskervilles are cited in the games. Later she is revealed to be Sharlotte Holmes, a Holmes' descendant.

== Holmes-inspired characters ==
=== Print ===
The future King of Thailand, Crown Prince Vajiravudh, published 15 stories featuring a detective Mr. Thong-in, and his assistant Mr. Wat, which were published in 1904-1905. The stories are widely recognised as containing elements from both Arthur Conan Doyle's Sherlock Holmes stories, and Edgar Allan Poe's "The Murders in the Rue Morgue".

August Derleth's Holmes-inspired sleuth Solar Pons is an obvious and early homage to Holmes. Derleth began to write the stories in 1928 after asking permission of Arthur Conan Doyle to continue the series of Sherlock Holmes stories (it was denied). The first collection of Pons stories was published in 1948, and Derleth's stories are contained in 13 additional books, several published after his death in 1971. Basil Copper continued the Pons series with an additional eight books, the most recent published in 2005.

The protagonist of Umberto Eco's novel The Name of the Rose, Friar William of Baskerville (per The Hound of the Baskervilles), and his novice Adso (who, like Watson, is the narrator), are patterned on Holmes and Watson. William of Baskerville is physically similar to Holmes, has the habit of addressing his companion with "My dear Adso" and the story itself is about a strictly rational brain following a path of investigation of a seemingly inexplicable chain of violent deaths.

Poul Anderson wrote several stories in which characters modelled themselves on Holmes, including "The Martian Crown Jewels", "The Queen of Air and Darkness", and "The Adventure of the Misplaced Hound".

In Robert A. Heinlein's The Moon Is a Harsh Mistress (1966) one of the characters is a computer, a model "HOLMES IV", which adopts the name Mycroft, after Sherlock Holmes' brother.

Julian Symons created a character named Sheridan Haynes, an actor immersed in the role of Holmes for an epic project to adapt the entire canon for television (almost ten years before Jeremy Brett took up a similar challenge), in the 1975 novel A Three Pipe Problem. Haynes finds himself confusing his own identity with Holmes', and becomes involved in a mystery. The character returned for a 1988 sequel, The Kentish Manor Murders, and Symons also wrote a Holmes short story pastiche.

Charles Hamilton, under the pseudonym Peter Todd, wrote almost 100 short parodies of the Holmes short stories from 1915 onwards. The characters became Herlock Sholmes and Dr Jotson, living in a Shaker Street apartment; and the sophisticated deductive reasoning of the original became absurdity in the spoofs, which were mainly published in a range of boys' comics of the period (The Greyfriars Herald, The Magnet, The Gem, etc.). Although satirical and often mocking contemporary mores (and World War I shortages), the stories had a real feel for the dialogue and structure of the originals. They were all reprinted in The Complete Casebook of Herlock Sholmes (Hawk Books 1989).

Michael Chabon's novella The Final Solution (2004) features an unnamed protagonist who is likely a retired Holmes. The story takes place during World War II, and features the Holmes character investigating the appearance of a mute boy with a parrot who repeatedly calls a string of seemingly random numbers in German. References to Holmes are plentiful: the protagonist is a bee keeper, is familiar with detectives in London, and smokes a pipe. The title simultaneously refers to the Nazi plan for genocide hinted at in the book and mirrors one of Doyle's own shorts, "The Final Problem".

Sarah Monette's The Angel of the Crows (2020), transposed to an alternative London with angels and werewolves, portrays Dr Watson as a field surgeon injured in the Second Anglo-Afghan War instead of India, and Sherlock Holmes as an angel. The work tries to be an anthology of several Holmes cases.

In the O. Henry short stories "The Sleuths", "The Adventures of Shamrock Jolnes" and "The Detective Detector" – story collections: Sixes and Sevens (1911), and Waifs and Strays (1917) – the character Shamrock Jolnes parodies Sherlock Holmes' deductive methods and disguises.

In Bret Harte's collection of burlesques of contemporaneous writers, Condensed Novels: New Burlesques, the character Hemlock Jones in the story "The Stolen Cigar Case By A. Co—n D—le" has been praised by Ellery Queen as "probably the best parody of Sherlock Holmes ever written".

In the first novel of Joyce Ballou Gregorian's Tredana Trilogy, The Broken Citadel, a young girl is transported from our world to a fantasy world called Tredana. She learns that the only previous traveller there from our world is a Norwegian explorer named Sigerson, who was taught how to get there by the Dalai Lama. In Conan Doyle's stories, during the period in which Holmes is presumed dead between the events of The Final Problem and The Adventure of the Empty House, one identity Holmes adopts is a Norwegian explorer named Sigerson who meets with the Dalai Lama.

Timothy Zahn's series of novels about the Star Wars character Grand Admiral Thrawn have led many to draw comparisons between the Chiss and Conan Doyle's Sherlock, from Thrawn's deductive methods to his companions and rivals. In Heir to the Empire, Captain Pellaeon serves as Thrawn's Watson, though in later books like Thrawn and Thrawn: Treason, Eli Vanto also plays a similar role to Watson, serving as Thrawn's aide, friend, and successor. The elusive Nightswan serves as Thrawn's Moriarty in the 2017 novel, and Thrass could arguably serve as Thrawn's Mycroft. In contrast, others have compared Thrawn to Moriarty due to his role within the Empire.

=== Film ===
The Mystery of the Leaping Fish (1916), starring Douglas Fairbanks

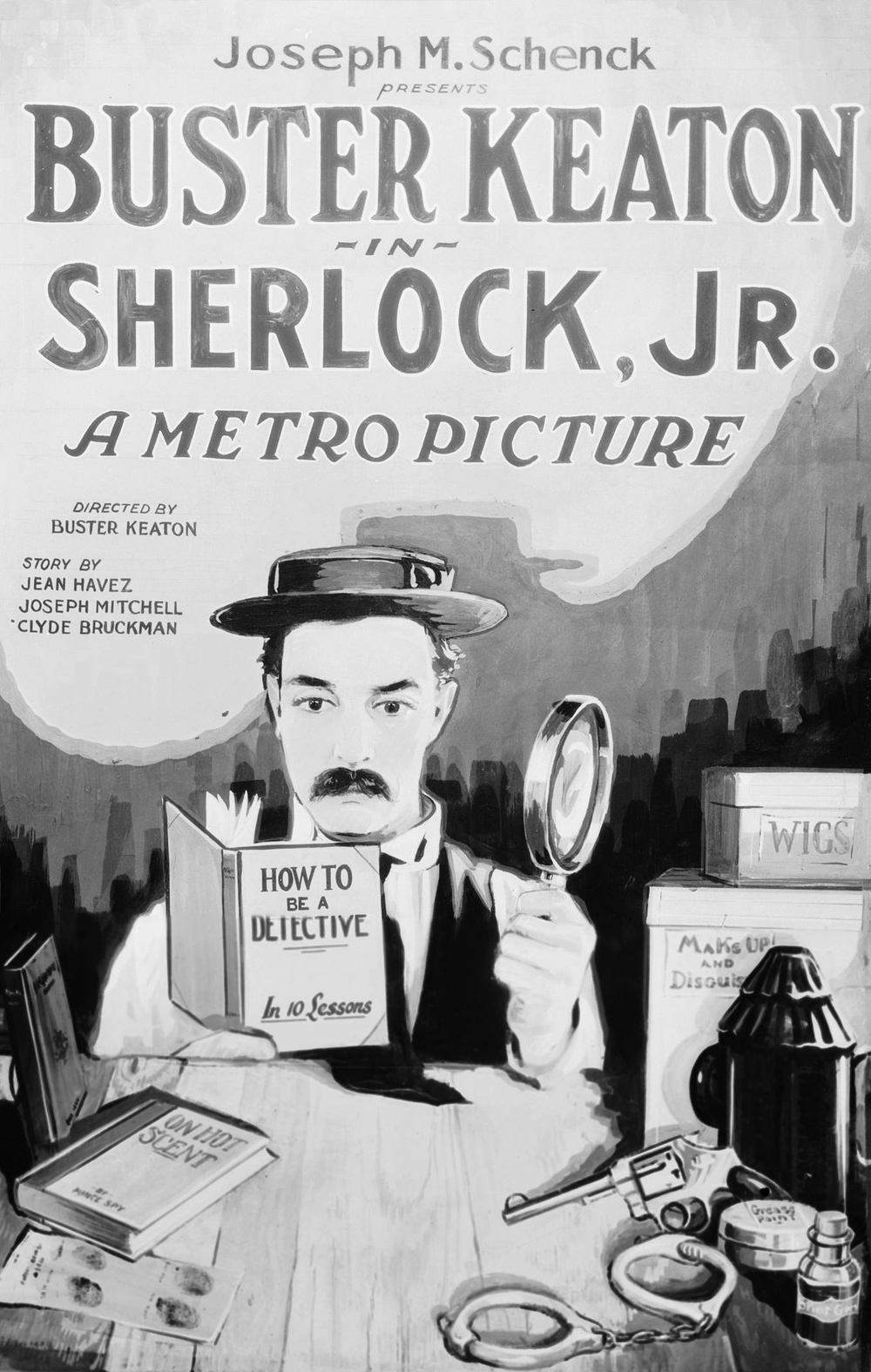
Buster Keaton in Sherlock Jr. (1924)

Douglas Fairbanks played a cocaine-addicted Holmes spoof named "Coke Enneday" in The Mystery of the Leaping Fish (1916). Many of this "scientific" detective's possessions are checkered in the Holmes manner, including his detective hat, jacket, and even his car, and whenever he feels momentarily dejected, he nonchalantly extracts yet another syringe from a bandolier on his chest and quickly injects himself with cocaine, laughing in merriment as an immediate result.

In 1924, comedian Buster Keaton made Sherlock Jr., about a film projectionist who dreams of becoming a great detective.

The 1971 film They Might Be Giants, adapted from James Goldman's 1961 British stage play of the same name, featured George C. Scott as a widowed judge named Justin Playfair who imagines himself to be Holmes. When his brother seeks to have him committed, he is brought to Dr. Mildred Watson (Joanne Woodward).

In The Return of the World's Greatest Detective (1976 TV movie), a rather ineffectual Los Angeles police officer, and avid fan of Sherlock Holmes, named Sherman Holmes (played by American actor Larry Hagman) suffers a brain injury when his parked motorcycle tips over and falls onto his head (he was lying beside it, reading). He wakes with both the unshakeable delusion that he is Sherlock Holmes and that he possesses all of Holmes' incredible deductive abilities. His friend and case-worker, Dr. Joan Watson (Jenny O'Hara), moves him to Apartment B of 221 Baker Street, where he becomes involved in the murder of an embezzler. Nicholas Colasanto also stars as Lt. Tinker, Holmes' former superior, who is in charge of the murder investigation. Reviewers of the day pointed out parallels to They Might Be Giants.

The 1986 Soviet comedy My Dearly Beloved Detective features two women (Shirley Holmes and Jane Watson) opening a private detective agency in London, to the displeasure of Scotland Yard at the competitors. Sherlock Holmes is fictional in the setting.

Zero Effect, loosely based on the Sherlock Holmes story "A Scandal in Bohemia", features Bill Pullman as Daryl Zero, a neurotic detective who is only in his element when on a case, and Ben Stiller as Watson-like assistant Steve Arlo. Set in modern Portland, Oregon, the search for a shady businessman's lost keys reveals a plot involving murder, blackmail, and secret identities. Instead of cocaine, Zero's occasional need for mental stimulation leads to experimentation with the drug mescaline. In the film, Zero indicates that he has mastered his technique of "Observation and Objectivity" – or as he calls them, "The Two Obs".

Sherlock Holmes also inspired Satyajit Ray to create the character Pradosh Mitter. Mitter, affectionately called Feluda, was immensely popular in Bengal. Feluda used the method of deduction to solve his cases, most of which were set in Calcutta. Ray even made some movies with Feluda as hero, including Sonar Kella (The Golden Fortress). Additionally, the Bengali writer Saradindu Bandyopadhyay also had a detective named Byomkesh Bakshi, which had some resemblance to Doyle's Holmes. In many ways Bakshi was different from the "drug-addict" bachelor image that Holmes had. Bakshi was married and had few addictions except that of a cigarette. In many ways, Byomkesh's character was distinctly different from that of Holmes. However both used deductions and were astute observers. In their character portrayal though the biggest difference lies. The frequently brooding trait in Holmes' character was not found in the cheerful portrayal of Byomkesh Bakshi. The adventures of Bakshi was later developed into a television series that was aired in Doordarshan, India's premier TV channel during those times, in the early 1990s. The series featuring Rajit Kapoor as Byomkesh Bakshi, telecast on the Doordarshan, inspired a lot of Indians to read the works of Sir Arthur Conan Doyle and re-read the works of Saradindu Bandyopadhyay.

=== TV ===
==== CSI: Crime Scene Investigation ====
The highly popular CSI: Crime Scene Investigation featured an entire episode circling around the death of a man who held 'mystery nights' with a group of friends in which they roleplayed as Holmes characters and solved invented crimes; his basement was an exact replica of Sherlock Holmes' 221B Baker Street parlour, and he emulated everything Holmes did in the books – from his smoking to his cocaine addiction. The episode was called "Who Shot Sherlock?". CSI is also notable for the lead character, Gil Grissom (William Petersen), has more than a passing similarity to Sherlock Holmes. Like Holmes, Grissom is dispassionate with a fierce devotion to logic and little regard for societal norms of behaviour; Grissom once smashed mustard jars in a grocery store to illustrate a theory, much as Holmes once practiced spearing a pig in a butchers shop to determine how strong a man would have to be to transfix a man with a harpoon. Grissom also possesses a Moriarty-like nemesis, Paul Millander (Matt O'Toole), whom he pursues in several episodes. Coincidentally, "Paul Millander" has the same initials as "Professor Moriarty." There's also a woman, Lady Heather Kessler (Melinda Clarke), in whom he takes an unusual interest. Their relationship is similar to that of Irene Adler and Holmes. Both Irene and Lady Heather enchant Holmes and Grissom with their beauty, their wit and their resolution. Lady Heather often wears Victorian-style dresses, referencing Holmes's era. Whilst Grisoms replacement D.B. Russell's (Ted Danson) official character sheet was described as "A west coast Sherlock Holmes who devours crime novels and looks at every crime scene as if it were a story waiting to be told". Both Grissom and Russell work with their CSI partners Catherine Willows (Marg Helgenberger) and Julie Finlay (Elisabeth Shue), respectively (both the equivalent of Dr. John Watson) while both working under the Las Vegas Police Department's Homicide Captain Jim Brass (Paul Guilfoyle) (the equivalent of Inspector Lestrade).

==== House M.D. ====
According to series creator David Shore, Gregory House was inspired by the fictional character Sherlock Holmes, particularly about drug use and his desire (and capacity) to solve the unsolvable. House uses Holmesian deductive techniques to diagnose his patients' problems. For example, references to Sherlock Holmes range from the obvious (House's apartment number is 221B) to the subtle (his friendship with Dr. James Wilson and the similarities between House and Holmes, and Wilson and Watson). In the pilot episode, the patient's last name was Adler, and in the last episode of season two, the man who shot House was Moriarty. House's act of faking cancer in season three, episode fifteen, "Half-Wit," is similar to the Holmes story, "The Adventure of the Dying Detective," Holmes fakes a deadly eastern disease to catch a criminal. The character of Holmes, was in turn, based on a Doctor that Sir Arthur Conan Doyle knew while studying medicine, Dr. Joseph Bell, whose specialty was diagnosis. In season five, episode eleven, "Joy to the World," Wilson presents House with Joseph Bell's Manual of the Operations of Surgery as a Christmas gift. When House's staff begins to wonder why he would throw away the expensive gift, an amused Wilson begins making up a story about House having a closeted infatuation with a patient named Irene Adler, who he will always consider to be "the one who got away." One character, Irene Adler, was wrongly characterized as Sherlock Holmes' love interest in several adaptations. Here, the one who got away parallels her was the one woman who defeated Sherlock Holmes, making Sherlock Holmes respect her. But he was never in love with her. The false story of Wilson about Irene Adler pays tribute to both of these facts. House also believed that his biological father was a family friend named Thomas Bell. The resemblance is evident in House's reliance on deductive reasoning and psychology, even where it might not seem obviously applicable and his reluctance to accept cases he finds uninteresting.

==== Law & Order: Criminal Intent ====
The character of Detective Robert Goren (Vincent D'Onofrio) is based on the popular fictional character of Sherlock Holmes, but instead of relying upon physical evidence like Holmes, Goren focuses on psychology to identify the perpetrators, whom he often draws into confessing or yielding condemning evidence. Goren also works with a John Watson like partner in Detective Alexandra Eames (Kathryn Erbe) and works for Inspector Lestrade type commanding officers Captain James Deakins (Jamey Sheridan) and Captain Danny Ross (Eric Bogosian). The character of Nicole Wallace (Olivia d'Abo) is a direct attempt to play on the part of Sherlock Holmes' female antagonist Irene Adler, also known as "The Woman". Wallace is employed as a "Professor of Literature" during her first appearance, which could be a parallel to Holmes' nemesis Professor Moriarty.

==== Monk ====
Andy Breckman, head writer of Monk, admitted to copying Adrian Monk from Conan Doyle "almost as if I used a Xerox machine". The characters and basic structure of the series were inspired by the Sherlock Holmes mysteries. The character name "Adrian Monk" was intended to be unusual like that of Sherlock Holmes. Other characters correspond to Holmes characters: Sharona Fleming (a nurse) and Dr. John Watson; Captain Leland Stottlemeyer and Lieutenant Randall Disher (named Randall Deacon in the pilot) served much the same function on this show as did Inspector Lestrade in the Sherlock Holmes stories. This relationship may have inspired these characters' names: taking the first two letters of each name in order – LE from "Leland", ST from "Stottlemeyer", RA from "Randall" and DE from "Deacon" – spells out "Lestrade". (However, after the show's pilot episode, Randy Deacon's last name was changed to Disher.) There's also Monk's brother Ambrose and Mycroft Holmes (Sherlock's brother) and Harold Krenshaw and James Moriarty (Holmes' nemesis), (JM) initials shifted two characters to the left in the alphabet (HK). Also, on another side note, Monk's second psychiatrist was called Dr. Bell. Sherlock Holmes was modeled on Dr Joseph Bell, a surgeon with outstanding deductive powers.

==== Others ====
Sherlock Hemlock is a muppet character based on Sherlock Holmes, who appears on the American children's programme Sesame Street.

The pilot episode of the well-remembered series, Murder, She Wrote, starring Angela Lansbury, aired on 30 September 1984. The story had to do with her character, mystery writer Jessica Fletcher, searching out the murderer of Caleb McCallum (played by Brian Keith) who is killed at a masquerade party where he is dressed in deerstalker cap and cape-coat. It was titled "The Murder of Sherlock Holmes".

=== Animation ===
In Warner Bros. long-running Looney Tunes cartoon show, Daffy Duck did a turn as "Dorlock Holmes" in the episode "Deduce, You Say", first shown in 1956. In this episode, Dorlock Holmes (festooned in deerstalker cap and residing on Beeker Street) and his assistant Watkins (played by Porky Pig) must track down the Shropshire Slasher.

Several Dick Tracy animated cartoons centre around a white bulldog, helmeted like a London bobby, named Hemlock Holmes.

Sherlock Holmes is extremely popular in Japan, and was an inspiration for the Japanese anime and manga, Case Closed (Detective Conan in Japan), where the main character, Jimmy Kudo (Shin'ichi Kudo), takes his pseudonym, Conan Edogawa, from two detective fiction authors, Edogawa Rampo and Arthur Conan Doyle. Incidentally Edogawa Rampo took his name from Edgar Allan Poe, the American writer known as the 'Father' of detective fiction. In addition, many of the characters of Detective Conan are inspired by characters from Doyle's original canon. Most notably is that Kudo himself is a take on Sherlock Holmes. This connection is made even more obvious by the naming of some of its fictional locations like Beika City and Haido City named after Baker Street and Hyde Park respectively. The Kudo family residence is even located at no. 21 of the second block in Beika Town.

=== Video games ===
The Other Guys has released in 2016 an app called Sherlock Holmes: Lost Detective. Divided into two seasons, the main character is a young Scotland Yard agent; in this game there is a professor of English literature claiming to be Sherlock Holmes. Originally for iOS and Android, at present time can be found only on iTunes.

Doctor Watson: Mystery Cases (also Doctor Watson: Treasure Island) and Doctor Watson 2: The Riddle of the Catacombs are two casual games (hidden object games with 3D capabilities) released by German software house UIG in which the main character is loosely inspired by the original Watson. Holmes himself, however, does not appear.

SecretBuilders Games has released in 2018 a casual game, Dr. Watson Mysteries – Hidden Objects Game, where the protagonist is Dr. Watson, not Sherlock Holmes, but it features many Conan Doyle's stories such as The Hound of the Baskervilles, The Valley of Fear, The Speckled Band, The Silver Blaze, The Musgrave Ritual, The Gloria Scott, and The Copper Beeches.

Crisp App Studios has developed a crime-comedy casual game named Sherlock Pug where the main character is an anthropomorphic dog who is also a police officer, assisted by a superhero (Super Al) to defeat the evil Skindiver who has seized Oddopolis; mainly targeted to a children audience, it is available on Steam and, freely, on Microsoft website.

=== Audio ===
The Tale of the Giant Rat of Sumatra is a comedy album created by The Firesign Theatre featuring Hemlock Stones and Flotsam.

== See also ==
- Fan fiction
- Klinger v. Conan Doyle Estate, Ltd.

== Bibliography ==
- Text was copied from Influence of Sherlock Holmes at the Baker Street Wiki, which is released under a Creative Commons Attribution-Share Alike 3.0 (Unported) (CC-BY-SA 3.0) license.
- Peter Ridgway Watt, Joseph Green, The alternative Sherlock Holmes: pastiches, parodies, and copies, Ashgate Publishing, 2003, ISBN 0-7546-0882-4
- Bernard A. Drew, Literary afterlife: the posthumous continuations of 325 authors' fictional characters, McFarland, 2009, ISBN 0-7864-4179-8, pp. 110–117
