= The Strange Case of Mrs. Hudson's Cat =

Book by Colin Bruce

The Strange Case of Mrs. Hudson's Cat: And Other Science Mysteries Solved by Sherlock Holmes
- Author: Colin Bruce
- Language: English
- Genre: Short stories
- Publisher: Addison–Wesley
- Publication date: 1997
- Media type: Print (Hardback)
- ISBN: 0-201-46139-0 (first edition, hardback)

The Strange Case of Mrs. Hudson's Cat: And Other Science Mysteries Solved by Sherlock Holmes is a collection of Sherlock Holmes pastiche stories by Colin Bruce which attempts to teach scientific concepts via Holmesian mysteries. With Watson's assistance, Holmes solves cases involving elastic space-time and quantum theory. It has also been published as The Einstein Paradox.

Professor Challenger also appears in some of the stories.

A further book, Conned Again, Watson! Cautionary Tales of Logic, Math, and Probability, which is more mathematically oriented, was published in 2001.

== Reception ==
Whether Bruce's attempt to explain modern physics in readable prose leads to illumination or not, readers of The Strange Case of Mrs. Hudson's Cat will enjoy pitting their wits against the universe in such stimulating company.

— The New York Times

What a great idea! ... Starting with simple problems of motion and energy, Bruce takes his readers into very modern questions of quantum mechanics and relativity... Great fun and fine teaching.

— Ben Bova, editor of The Science Fiction Hall of Fame, Volume Two
