= The Return of Sherlock Holmes (1987 film) =

1987 film directed by Kevin Connor

- Genre: Mystery
- Written by: Bob Shayne
- Directed by: Kevin Connor
- Starring: Margaret Colin; Michael Pennington; Daniel Benzali; Connie Booth; Nicholas Guest
- Music by: Ken Thorne
- Country of origin: United States
- Original language: English

Production
- Executive producer: Bob Shayne
- Producer: Nick Gillott
- Cinematography: Tony Imi
- Editor: Bernard Gribble
- Running time: 100 minutes
- Production company: CBS Entertainment Production

Original release
- Network: CBS
- Release: January 10, 1987

The Return of Sherlock Holmes is a 1987 American made-for-television mystery film and pilot created, written and produced by Bob Shayne involving the famous detective Sherlock Holmes finding himself in the modern world. It originally premiered January 10, 1987 on CBS.

== Plot ==
In the opening sequence, a former FBI agent named Carter Morstan receives an unwelcome visit by a man named Small. In the ensuing struggle, a gunshot rings out. Subsequently, a body is wrapped into a carpet and set alight.

Jane Watson works as a private detective in Boston, Massachusetts, but faces financial ruin because she approaches her job from a more humane angle, much to the chagrin of her secretary, Ms Houston. Therefore, Jane is eventually forced to sell the English country estate of her ancestor, John Watson. She visits the old house one last time, where a lawyer hands her an envelope with detailed instructions inside. Following those instructions, Jane finds a hidden basement containing a primitive cryogenic capsule with a man lying inside, whom she thaws.

The man inside the capsule turns out to be her ancestor's friend and partner, the legendary Sherlock Holmes himself. He had received a booby-trapped gift from the brother of his old nemesis, James Moriarty, which infected him with the bubonic plague. In hopes of receiving a cure somewhere in the future, Holmes and Watson had devised the desperate plan of putting Holmes into suspended animation to save Holmes' life. Although she is at a loss to explain the recurrence of the plague to the doctor she seeks out, Jane manages to administer the cure to Holmes.

Holmes soon finds himself in a world which has changed a lot in his absence, and lacking an alternative, he accompanies Jane to America, where they are immediately drawn into a mysterious case. Someone has ransacked Jane's office and left a message signed Small. Afterward, they receive a visit from Carter Morstan's daughter Violet, who asks her to investigate her father's murder and states that the message found in Jane's office was meant for her. Jane and Holmes (who uses one of his old aliases, Holmes Sigerson) mean to ask the FBI, but the higher ranks are stone-walling, and soon Holmes and Jane find themselves under the close scrutiny of a young agent named Tobias. When both begin to backtrack three of Morstan's former colleagues and friends, they find one of them dead.

With some aid from Tobias, Holmes and Jane finally receive the information they need: Just before their retirement from the FBI, Morstan and his colleagues were involved in a hijacking case and the simultaneous disappearance of several millions of counterfeit money. The perpetrator in the hijacking case was one Peter Small, and when the four agents were suspected of having stolen the counterfeit money, they refused a lie detector test and subsequently quit the FBI. It takes Holmes and Jane not long to guess that the counterfeit money was used to pay off Small, and the four FBI agents had kept the ransom for themselves, so Small exacting revenge on his betrayers seems the most logical motive. But Small seems to stay one step ahead of them: their next candidate of the four is murdered as they try to warn him, and when the last survivor finally leads them to the cache where they have hidden the ransom money, it is already gone.

In the end, however, Holmes finally deduces the truth of the scheme. The culprit is actually Carter Morstan himself; soon after he and his partners had hidden the money, he had appropriated all of it for his own. Small had been killed during their struggle, and Morstan decided to kill his comrades in crime before they would discover his duplicity, and then frame Small for the murders. The burglary of Jane's office had been staged both to drive Jane into investigating the case and to hide a bug in the office to keep tabs on Jane and Holmes' progress and beat them to his former partners. With a cunning scheme, partially inspired by the Watergate scandal, Holmes manages to lure Morstan out of hiding and right into the arms of the FBI, resolving the case. The film ends with the prospect of Jane establishing a relationship with Tobias and Holmes.

== Cast ==
- Michael Pennington as Sherlock Holmes
- Margaret Colin as Jane Watson
- Daniel Benzali as Ross
- Connie Booth as Violet
- Nicholas Guest as Toby
- Lila Kaye as Ms. Houston
- William Hootkins as Spellman
- Paul Maxwell as Hopkins
- Barry Morse as Carter Morstan

== Production ==
At the time, the film was presented as a pilot for a possible series. Despite some excellent reviews from television critics, the show was never picked up.

=== Writing ===
The details of the main plot are adapted from The Sign of the Four. Writer Bob Shayne consulted with Michael Hodel, Sean Wright, and Nancy Senter.

=== Filming locations ===
A scene where Holmes is lost in the Arizona desert and finds himself in what he temporarily believes to be a heavenly facsimile of his native London was filmed at London Bridge, Lake Havasu.

=== Similar shows ===
A 1993 television film, 1994 Baker Street: Sherlock Holmes Returns, starring Anthony Higgins and Debrah Farentino, had a nearly identical plotline.

== Home media ==
CBS Entertainment released a Region 1 DVD of the film in September 2019.
