= His Last Bow (short story) =

- Short story by Arthur Conan Doyle
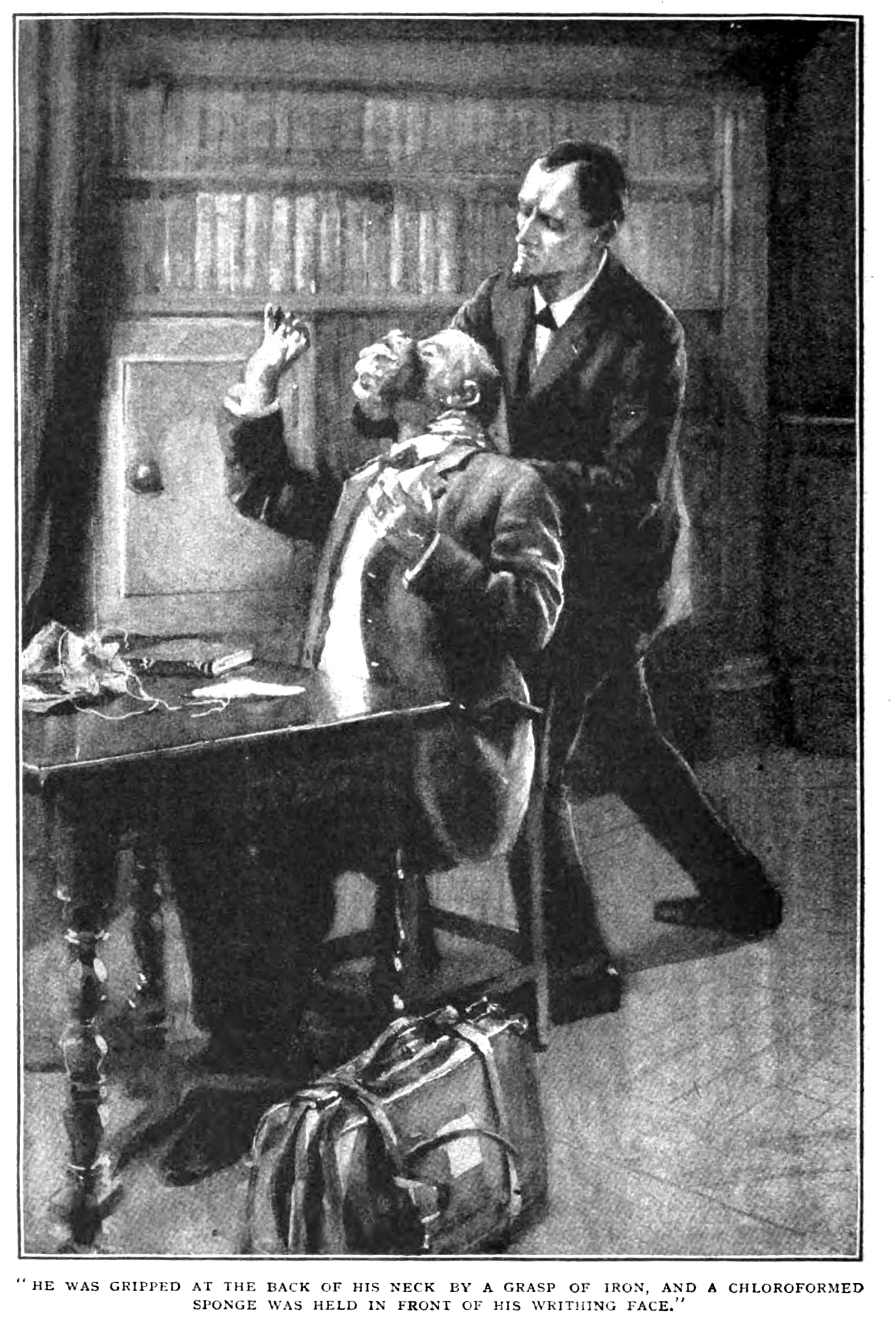
- 1917 illustration by Alfred Gilbert in The Strand Magazine

Publication
- Publication date: September 1917

Chronology
- Series: His Last Bow
The Adventure of the Dying Detective	The Adventure of the Mazarin Stone

"His Last Bow. The War Service of Sherlock Holmes", later titled "His Last Bow: An Epilogue of Sherlock Holmes", is one of 56 short stories about Sherlock Holmes written by Sir Arthur Conan Doyle. It was first published in September 1917 in The Strand Magazine and collected as the last of an anthology of eight stories titled His Last Bow: Some Reminiscences of Sherlock Holmes the following month. The narration is in the third person, instead of the first person narration usually provided by the character of Dr. Watson, and it is a spy story, rather than a detective mystery. Due to its portrayal of British and German spies on the eve of war, its publication during the First World War, and its patriotic themes, the story has been interpreted as a propaganda tool intended to boost morale for British readers.

== Plot ==
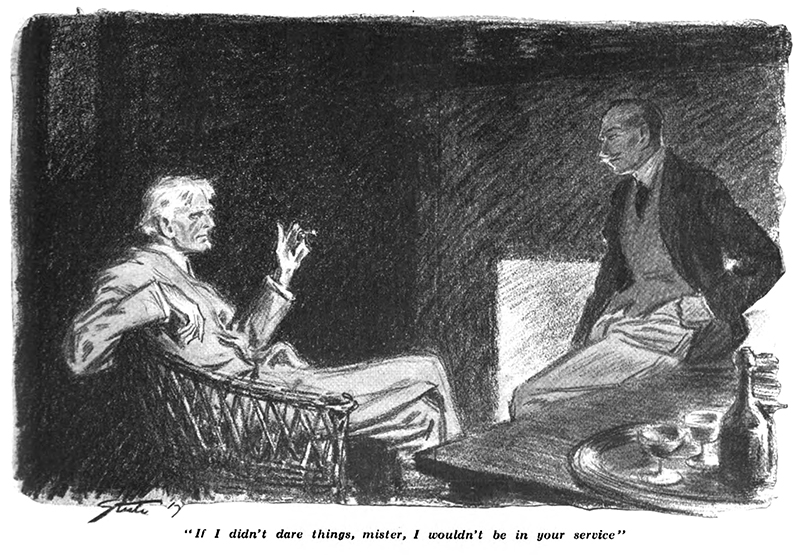
1917 illustration by Frederic Dorr Steele in Collier's

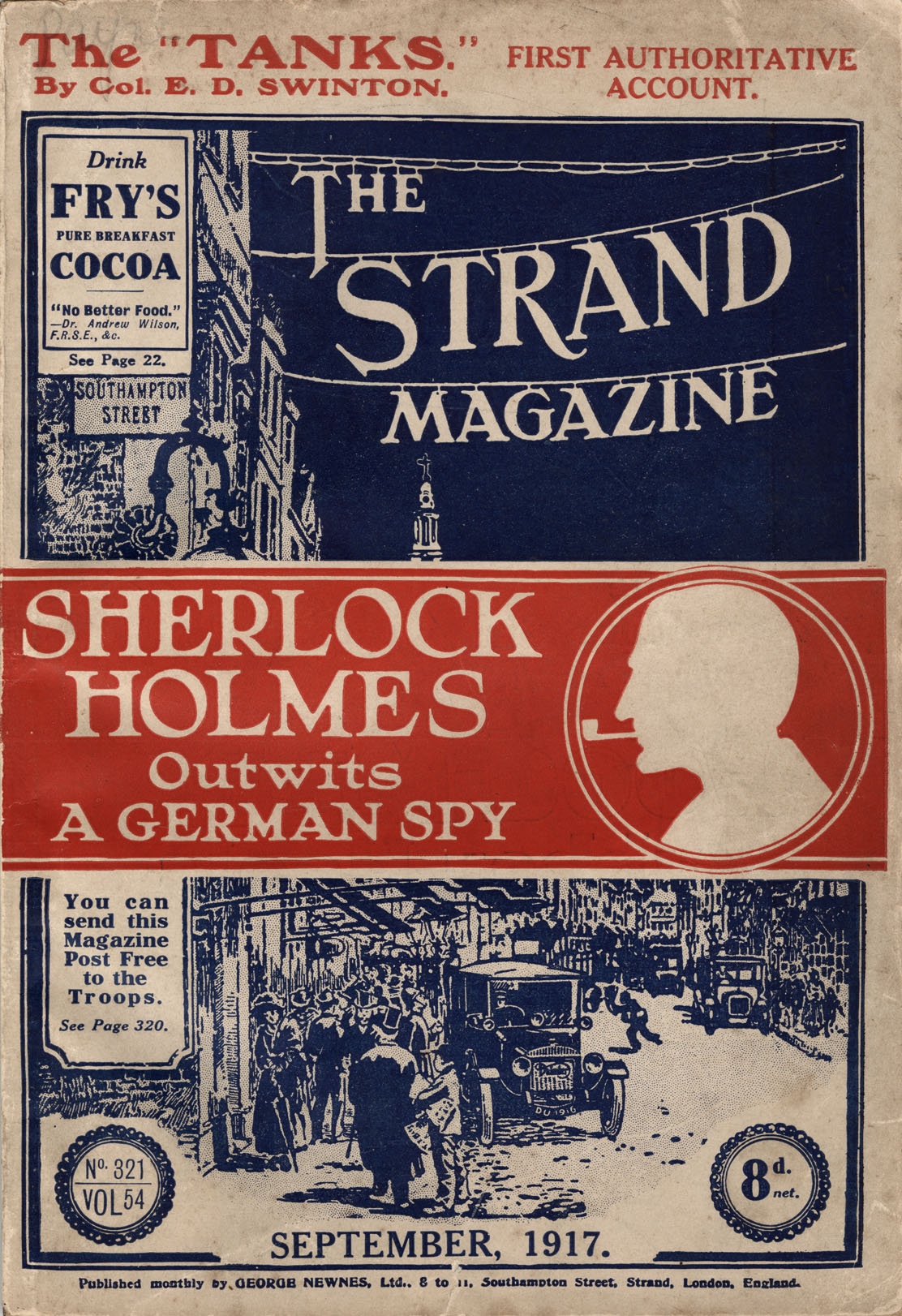
Arthur Conan Doyle did his part to raise wartime morale by continuing to provide The Strand Magazine with the public's favoured reading material. The vol. 65, no. 321, September 1917 issue contained the Holmes story "His Last Bow."

On the eve of the First World War, the German agent Von Bork is getting ready to leave England with his vast collection of intelligence, gathered over a four-year period. His wife and household have already left Harwich for Flushing in the Netherlands, leaving only him and his elderly English housekeeper. Von Bork's associate, Baron von Herling, a German diplomat from the Embassy of Germany, is impressed by his acquisition of vital British military secrets, and tells Von Bork that he will be received in Berlin as a hero. Von Bork says that he is waiting for one last transaction with his Irish-American informant, Altamont, who will arrive shortly with a rich treasure: naval signals.

Von Herling leaves just before Altamont arrives. Von Bork's housekeeper has turned her light off and retired. Altamont shows Von Bork a package. Altamont disparages Von Bork's safe, but Von Bork proudly says that its construction and the double combination lock make it impenetrable. He tells Altamont that the combination is "August 1914". Altamont, mentioning cases in which several German informants have ended up in prison, is distrustful of Von Bork and refuses to deliver the naval codes until he receives payment. Von Bork refuses to pay until he has examined Altamont's intelligence data.

Altamont hands him the package. Von Bork finds that it is a book titled Practical Handbook of Bee Culture, hardly what he expected. Even less expected is the chloroform-soaked rag that is held in his face by Altamont a moment later. Altamont is actually Sherlock Holmes in disguise, and the chauffeur who brought him is Dr. Watson. Now past their heyday, they have nonetheless caught several spies (Holmes is actually responsible for the imprisoned agents of whom "Altamont" spoke), and fed the Germans some thoroughly untrustworthy intelligence. Holmes had retired from detective work, spending his days beekeeping in the countryside, but returned after the Foreign Minister and the Premier came to him. Holmes has been on this case for two years, and it has taken him to Chicago, Buffalo, and Ireland, where he learnt to play the part of a bitter Irish-American, even gaining the credentials of a member of a secret society. He identified the security leak through which British secrets were reaching the Germans, and then set out to apprehend the receiving agents themselves. The housekeeper was one of Holmes' agents: the light that she switched off was the signal to Holmes and Watson that the coast was clear.

Holmes and Watson take Von Bork and the evidence to Scotland Yard. In reference to the impending War, Holmes says, "There's an east wind coming, Watson." Watson misinterprets the meaning of the words and says, "I think not, Holmes. It is very warm", to which Holmes replies:

"Good old Watson! You are the one fixed point in a changing age. There's an east wind coming all the same, such a wind as never blew on England yet. It will be cold and bitter, Watson, and a good many of us may wither before its blast. But it's God's own wind none the less, and a cleaner, better, stronger land will lie in the sunshine when the storm has cleared."

== Publication history ==
"His Last Bow" was first published in the UK in The Strand Magazine in September 1917, and in the US in Collier's in the same month. The story was published with three illustrations by Alfred Gilbert (best known as sculptor of the Shaftesbury Memorial Fountain) in the Strand, and with five illustrations by Frederic Dorr Steele in Collier's. It was included in the short story collection His Last Bow, which was published in the UK and the US in October 1917.

== Legacy ==
The story is the last chronological installment of the series. The Case-Book of Sherlock Holmes, set before the story, was published later.

Holmes' patriotic passage has been widely quoted, and was later used in the final scene of the Basil Rathbone film Sherlock Holmes and the Voice of Terror (1942), loosely based on "His Last Bow", though set during World War II.

The events leading up to and beyond this story were described in Sherlock Holmes and the Railway Maniac (1994, ISBN 978-0-7490-0546-7), by Barrie Roberts. The end of Nicholas Meyer's 1993 novel The Canary Trainer ties into "His Last Bow", with Edward Grey and H. H. Asquith approaching Holmes to request he come out of retirement to investigate a man named Von Bork. Ten Years Beyond Baker Street by Cay Van Ash is set during Holmes's undercover search for Von Bork; it tells how he divides his time between his counter-espionage task and a search for Sir Denis Nayland Smith, believed to have been kidnapped by Fu Manchu; thus, Van Ash combines the worlds created by Conan Doyle and Sax Rohmer.

The story is continued in Robert Ryan's 2015 novel A Study in Murder, the third in his "Dr Watson" detective series, in which Von Bork torments Dr Watson, now a prisoner of war in Germany, and arranges for him to be exchanged for Sherlock Holmes so that he can exact his revenge.

Peter Brown wrote "Anyone having any knowledge or experience of actual intelligence work could not help a gasp of horror at what Sherlock Holmes is doing in 'His Last Bow'. Having by patient hard work established his credentials with the Germans and being in a perfect position to go on feeding them false information for the rest of the war, Holmes for no reason whatsoever blows his own cover and destroys everything. Why, for God's sake? Why? How I wish I could reach into that room and shout at Holmes: 'Stop! What are you doing? Are you crazy?'. Alas, this story with its monumental blunder must remain forever as it is. Conan Doyle had a wide knowledge of many subjects - evidently, intelligence work was not one of them. There were in 1916 England some people he could have profitably consulted on the subject."

== Adaptations ==
=== Film and television ===
A silent short film based on the story was released in 1923 as part of the Sherlock Holmes film series by Stoll Pictures. Eille Norwood played Sherlock Holmes and Hubert Willis played Dr. Watson.

The 1942 American film Sherlock Holmes and the Voice of Terror starring Basil Rathbone is credited as an adaptation of this story.

"His Last Bow" was adapted as part of the storyline in the 1986 Soviet film The Twentieth Century Approaches, the final entry in the Adventures of Sherlock Holmes and Dr. Watson film series.

An episode of the animated television series Sherlock Holmes in the 22nd Century was based on the story. The episode, titled "The Secret Safe", aired in 2001.

=== Radio and audio dramas ===
"His Last Bow" was dramatised by Edith Meiser as an episode of the American radio series The Adventures of Sherlock Holmes. The episode aired on 12 October 1932, with Richard Gordon as Sherlock Holmes and Leigh Lovell as Dr. Watson.

The story was adapted for BBC radio in 1969 by Michael Hardwick, as part of the 1952–1969 radio series starring Carleton Hobbs as Holmes and Norman Shelley as Watson.

"His Last Bow" was dramatised for BBC Radio 4 in 1994 by Bert Coules as part of the 1989–1998 radio series starring Clive Merrison as Holmes and Michael Williams as Watson. It featured Norman Rodway as Stamford, Michael Cochrane as Captain Kell, and Preston Lockwood as H. H. Asquith.

In 2015, the story was adapted as an episode of The Classic Adventures of Sherlock Holmes, a series on the American radio show Imagination Theatre, with John Patrick Lowrie as Holmes and Lawrence Albert as Watson.
