= Colin Bruce (author) =

British author and physicist

- Occupations: Author, physicist
- Writing career
- Genres: Popular Science, fiction, non-fiction
- Notable work: The Strange Case of Mrs Hudson's Cat
- Website: www.penguin.co.uk/authors/169925/colin-bruce

Colin Bruce is a British author and physicist. He has written many scientific works, including non-fiction, but he is most well known for his popular science stories. He is an expert in mathematical paradoxes and a lover of mysteries. Living in Oxford, he frequently contributes to university life through giving talks at the Oxford University Physics Society and Oxford University Scientific Society, and attending various events.

== Selected works ==
- The Strange Case of Mrs Hudson's Cat
- Conned Again, Watson: Cautionary Tales of Logic, Math and Probability
- Schrödinger's Rabbits: The Many Worlds of Quantum
