= Michael Pennington =

English actor (1943–2026)

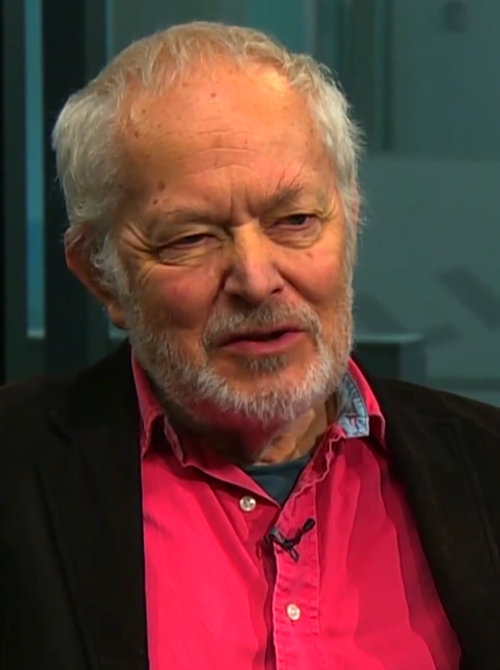
- Pennington in 2014
- Born: Michael Vivian Fyfe Pennington; 7 June 1943; Cambridge, England
- Died: 7 May 2026 (aged 82); Denville Hall, London, England
- Occupations: Actor; director; writer
- Years active: 1964–2026
- Spouse: Katharine Barker (m. 1964; div. 1967)
- Children: 1

Michael Vivian Fyfe Pennington (7 June 1943 – 7 May 2026) was an English actor, director and writer. Together with director Michael Bogdanov, he founded the English Shakespeare Company in 1986 and was its joint artistic director until 1992. He wrote ten books, directed in the UK and across the world, and was an honorary associate artist of the Royal Shakespeare Company.

Over a 60-year stage career he played a host of Shakespeare's title roles and other leading characters, while on screen he appeared as Laertes in Hamlet (1969), Moff Jerjerrod in Return of the Jedi (1983), and Michael Foot in The Iron Lady (2011).

== Background ==
Pennington was born in Cambridge, East Anglia, the son of Vivian Maynard Cecil Pennington (died 1984) and Euphemia Willock, née Fyfe (died 1987), and grew up in London. He was educated at Marlborough College, became a member of the National Youth Theatre and then read English at Trinity College, Cambridge.

== Theatre work ==
Pennington joined the Royal Shakespeare Company on graduation and remained in a junior capacity from 1964 to 1966, playing among other things Fortinbras in David Warner's 1965 Hamlet. He then left the company for eight years and worked in London, both on the stage (in John Mortimer's The Judge, Christopher Hampton's Savages and Tony Richardson's production of Hamlet with Nicol Williamson), and on television in many single dramas. He returned to the RSC in 1974 to play Angelo in Measure for Measure, beginning a relationship with the company as a leading actor which culminated in his own performance of Hamlet in 1980–81: he also played Berowne in Love's Labour's Lost, Edgar in King Lear, and in new work by David Rudkin, David Edgar and Howard Brenton and classic works by Sean O'Casey, Euripides and William Congreve. He then left the company for a further eight years before appearing in Stephen Poliakoff's Playing with Trains, and ten years after that in the title role of Timon of Athens. In the meanwhile he appeared at the National Theatre in 1984 in Tolstoy's Strider, for which he was nominated for an Olivier Award, in Thomas Otway's Venice Preserv'd, and also premiered his solo show Anton Chekhov which he subsequently toured internationally. He also played Raskolnikov in Yuri Lyubimov's adaptation of Crime and Punishment, and Henry in Tom Stoppard's The Real Thing in London's West End and played the title role in Sophocles' Oedipus Rex on BBC TV in 1985.

In 1986, Pennington and director Michael Bogdanov together founded the English Shakespeare Company. As joint artistic director, he starred in the company's inaugural productions of The Henrys and, in 1987, the seven-play history cycle of The Wars of the Roses, which toured worldwide and was televised. Pennington played such parts as Richard II, Prince Hal/Henry V and Jack Cade (Olivier Award Nomination). In subsequent seasons with the ESC, he played Leontes in The Winter's Tale and the title roles in Macbeth and Coriolanus (Olivier Award Nomination) and directed Twelfth Night, which he then also directed for the Haiyuza Theatre Company in Tokyo and for the Chicago Shakespeare Theatre.

From the 1970s, he appeared frequently with Judi Dench and also with her husband Michael Williams. The third time he played opposite Dench was in Peter Shaffer's play The Gift of the Gorgon, in 1992, in which they appeared as a married couple. His other West End work in the 1990s included Archie Rice in The Entertainer, Claudius and the Ghost in Hamlet, Major Arnold in Taking Sides (Ronald Harwood), Oscar Wilde in Gross Indecency, Sir John Brute in Farquhar's The Provok'd Wife, Henry Trebell in Harley Granville Barker's Waste, Trigorin in The Seagull, and the title role in Molière's The Misanthrope. In the first Harold Pinter Festival in Dublin he played in Pinter's Old Times and One for the Road. In 1998, he worked with Sir Peter Hall and other actors to run a workshop at the National Theatre Studio, which received considerable plaudits.

His stage work in the 2000s included Joe Orton's What the Butler Saw (National tour), the title role in The Guardsman (West End), David Mamet's The Shawl (Crucible Theatre Sheffield), Walter Burns in The Front Page, (Chichester Festival Theatre), the title roles in Ibsen's John Gabriel Borkman and Alan Bennett's The Madness of George III, and Dr Dorn in Chekhov's The Seagull, directed by Peter Stein for the Edinburgh Festival) In 2003 he directed A Midsummer Night's Dream in Regent's Park Open Air Theatre and The Hamlet Project for the National Theatre in Bucharest. In 2005 he appeared in David Greig's The Cosmonaut's Last Message... (Donmar Warehouse); Colder Than Here (Soho Theatre), and in the title role in Nathan the Wise (Hampstead Theatre).

He also played a sequence of real-life characters such as Sidney Cockerell in The Best of Friends (Hampstead Theatre 2006), 2007 : Robert Maxwell in The Bargain by Ian Curteis (2007), Charles Dickens in Little Nell by Simon Gray (2007), Wilhelm Furtwangler in Pinter's Taking Sides and Richard Strauss in Collaboration by Ronald Harwood (Chichester and West End, 2008–09). He had previously played the other central role in Taking Sides in the West End, with Pinter directing.

In 2006, he premièred his second one-man show, this one on Shakespeare, Sweet William, and in 2009 he worked with Peter Brook for the first time in Love is My Sin for a European tour and in New York.

In 2010, he returned to Chichester to play the title role in Ibsen's The Master Builder, and the following year Dr Fabio in The Syndicate by Eduardo de Filippo opposite Ian McKellen. In 2012 he played his fifth consecutive Chichester season as Antony in Antony and Cleopatra opposite Kim Cattrall. Notable performances since then have been as Edgar in Strindberg's The Dance of Death, adapted by Howard Brenton, at the Gate Theatre, as John of Gaunt in Richard II (RSC), and as Anthony Blunt in Alan Bennett's Single Spies, at the Rose Theatre Kingston. In 2014 he performed the title role in King Lear for Theatre for a New Audience in New York, before undertaking a further tour of his solo Shakespeare show Sweet William (Oregon, Tel Aviv, France). He recorded the part of Euripides in Macedonia by David Rudkin for Radio 3, and in 2015 planned to take his solo show Anton Chekhov to Moscow. In 2015 he performed Sweet William in Argentina and Uruguay at the Festival Shakespeare Buenos Aires and Festival Shakespeare Uruguay.

== Other work ==
In 1983, Pennington appeared as Moff Jerjerrod in the Star Wars film Return of the Jedi alongside fellow Old Vic alumnus James Earl Jones. He also played Michael Foot in The Iron Lady (2011) with Meryl Streep. His notable TV appearances included the title roles in Oedipus Rex (1986) and the 1987 made-for-television film The Return of Sherlock Holmes. He also played Holmes's nemesis, Professor Moriarty, in two BBC Radio dramatisations of the Holmes short stories "The Final Problem" in 1992 and "The Empty House" in 1993.

He was the author of the book Are You There, Crocodile? which combines biographical material about the Russian playwright Anton Chekhov with an account of the writing of his highly successful one-man show about Chekhov, the full text of which is included. He also wrote three books about individual Shakespeare plays, Sweet William – Twenty Thousand Hours with Shakespeare, as well as Let Me Play the Lion Too – How to Be an Actor for Faber and Faber. His solo show Sweet William is available as a DVD. Pennington also worked as a narrator on many TV documentaries.

In April 2004, he became the second actor, after Harley Granville-Barker in 1925, to deliver the British Academy's annual Shakespeare lecture. The lecture was entitled Barnadine's Straw: The Devil in Shakespeare's Detail.

== Personal life and death ==
In 1964, Pennington married actress Katharine Barker, with whom he had a son before they divorced in 1967. Beginning in 1978, when they appeared together in Love's Labour's Lost, he shared a flat with actress Jane Lapotaire in St John's Wood, London, though at the time Lapotaire said they were "just friends".

Pennington died at Denville Hall, London, on 7 May 2026, at the age of 82. His long-term partner, arts administrator Prue Skene, pre-deceased him in 2025.

== Selected stage credits ==
- Richard II (Earl of Salisbury), National Youth Theatre, Apollo Theatre, London, 9–19 and 30 August – 2 September 1961
- Henry IV, Part 2 (Earl of Warwick), National Youth Theatre, Apollo Theatre, London, 22–29 August 1961
- Hamlet (title role), ADC Theatre, Cambridge, February 1964
- Love's Labour's Lost (Dumaine and understudying Berowne), Royal Shakespeare Company, Stratford-upon-Avon, 1965
- Hamlet (Fortinbras), RSC, Stratford-upon-Avon and Aldwych Theatre, London, 1965
- The Judge by John Mortimer, Theatre Royal, Brighton, and Cambridge Theatre, London, 1967
- Hamlet (Laertes), Round House, London, Lunt-Fontanne Theatre, New York, and Huntington Hartford Theatre, Los Angeles, 1969
- Three Sisters (Andrei), Cambridge Arts Theatre, 1971
- Trelawny of the Wells (Ferdinand Gadd), Cambridge Arts Theatre, 1971
- Savages by Christopher Hampton (Crawshaw), Royal Court Theatre and Comedy Theatre, London, 1973
- Measure for Measure (Angelo), RSC, Stratford-upon-Avon, 1974
- The Tempest (Ferdinand), RSC, Stratford-upon-Avon, 1974
- Afore Night Come (Johnny Hobnails), RSC, Stratford-upon-Avon, 1974
- Romeo and Juliet (Mercutio), RSC, Straford-upon-Avon, 1976, and Aldwych Theatre, London, 1977
- Troilus and Cressida (Hector), RSC, Stratford-upon-Avon, 1976, and Aldwych Theatre, London, 1977
- King Lear (Edgar), RSC, Stratford-upon-Avon, 1976, and Aldwych Theatre London, 1977
- Destiny by David Edgar (Major Rolfe), RSC, Stratford-upon-Avon, 1976, and Aldwych Theatre, London, 1977
- The Way of the World (Mirabell), RSC, Aldwych Theatre, London, 1978
- Measure for Measure (the Duke), RSC, Stratford-upon-Avon, 1978, and Aldwych Theatre, London, 1979
- Love's Labour's Lost (Berowne), RSC, Stratford-upon-Avon, 1978, and Aldwych Theatre, London,
- Hippolytus (title role), RSC, Stratford-Upon-Avon, 1978, and The Warehouse, London, 1979
- The White Guard (Shervinsky), RSC, Aldwych Theatre, London, 1979
- The Shadow of a Gunman (Donal Davoren), RSC, Stratford-upon-Avon, 1980, and The Warehouse, London, 1981
- Hamlet (title role), RSC, Stratford-upon-Avon, 1980, Theatre Royal, Newcastle, 1981, and Aldwych Theatre, London, 1981
- Crime and Punishment (Raskolnikov), directed by Yuri Lyubimov, Lyric Hammersmith, London, 1983
- Strider, The Story of a Horse by Mark Rozovsky based on Kholstomer by Leo Tolstoy (title role), Cottesloe Theatre, London, 1984
- Venice Preserv'd (Jaffier), Lyttelton at the Royal National Theatre, London, 1984
- Anton Chekhov, his one-man-play about Anton Chekhov (Anton Chekhov), Cottesloe Theatre, London, 1984
- Henry IV Parts One and Two, (Prince Hal), English Shakespeare Company, 1986–1989
- Henry V (title role), English Shakespeare Company, 1986–1989
- Richard II (title role), English Shakespeare Company, 1987–1989
- The Winter's Tale (Leontes), English Shakespeare Company, 1990–1991
- Coriolanus (title role), English Shakespeare Company, 1990–1991
- Macbeth (title role), English Shakespeare Company, 1991–1992
- The Gift of the Gorgon by Peter Shaffer (Edward Damson), West End, 1992
- The Entertainer (Archie Rice), Hampstead Theatre, 1996
- Waste (Henry Trebell), directed by Peter Hall, Old Vic, London, 1997
- The Seagull (Trigorin), directed by Peter Hall, Old Vic, London, 1997
- The Provoked Wife (Sir John Brute), directed by Lindsay Posner, Old Vic, London, 1997
- The Misanthrope (title role), directed by Peter Hall, Piccadilly Theatre, London, 1998
- Filumena (Domenico), directed by Peter Hall, Piccadilly Theatre, London, 1998
- Gross Indecency (Oscar Wilde), directed by Moises Kaufman, Gielgud Theatre, London, 1999
- Timon of Athens (title role), directed by Gregory Doran, RSC, Stratford and London, 1999–2000
- John Gabriel Borkman (title role), English Touring Theatre, 2003
- The Madness of George III (title role) West Yorkshire Playhouse and Birmingham Rep, 2003
- The Seagull (Dr Dorn), directed by Peter Stein, Edinburgh Festival, 2003
- Sweet William (One man show about Shakespeare) London and international touring, 2007 on
- Collaboration by Ronald Harwood (Richard Strauss), Duchess Theatre, London, 2009
- "Taking Sides" by Ronald Harwood (Major Steve Arnold), Duchess Theatre, London, 2009
- The Master Builder by Henrik Ibsen, (title role), Chichester Festival Theatre, 2010
- Love Is My Sin directed by Peter Brook, international tour and Broadway, 2010
- The Syndicate (Dr Fabio) by Eduardo di Filippo, adapted by Mike Poulton, directed by Sean Mathias, Chichester Festival Theatre, 2011
- Judgement Day by Henrik Ibsen, adapted by Mike Poulton, directed by James Dacre, The Print Room, 2011
- Antony and Cleopatra (Antony), directed by Janet Suzman, Chichester Festival Theatre, 2012
- King Lear (title role), directed by Arin Arbus, Theatre for a New Audience at the Polonsky Shakespeare Center, 2013
- King Lear (title role), directed by Michael Webster, national tour, 2016

== Filmography ==
=== Film ===
Year	Title	Role	Notes
1969	Hamlet	Laertes	With Nicol Williamson in the title role
1983	Return of the Jedi	Moff Jerjerrod	
1997	The Empire Strikes Back	Moff Jerjerrod	Archive footage; Special Edition re-release
2005	Fragile	Marcus	
2011	The Iron Lady	Michael Foot	With Meryl Streep in the title role

=== Television ===
Year	Title	Role	Notes
1965	The Wars of the Roses		Miniseries
1966	Drama 61-67	First Youth	Episode: "Don Quixote Go Home"
1966	Theatre 625	Wulfnoth Godwinson/Alexander	2 episodes
1967	No Hiding Place	Gerry Waltham	Episode: "It Couldn't Be Charlie"
1967	Sat'day While Sunday	Adrian	Episode: "Once a Year in the Season"
1968	Middlemarch	Will Ladislaw	7 episodes
1967-1970	The Wednesday Play	Various	3 episodes
1968-1970	Armchair Theatre	Adrian/Tom	2 episodes
1968-1977	ITV Playhouse	Various	3 episodes
1971	Public Eye	John Sheldon	Episode, "Well; There Was This Girl, You See"
1972	Thirty-Minute Theatre	Martin	Episode: "An Affair of Honour"
1972	Callan	Lafarge	Episode: "The Contract"
1977	The Witches of Pendle	Minister	TV film
1978-1982	BBC Play of the Month	Saint-Just/Alexei Turbin	2 episodes
1981	BBC2 Playhouse	John Lilburne	Episode: "A Last Visitor for Mr. Hugh Peter"
1982	BBC Television Shakespeare	Posthumus	Episode: Cymbeline
1984	Waving to a Train	Richard	TV film
1984	Freud	Carl Jung	2 episodes
1986	ScreenPlay	Thomas Kyd	Episode: "The Marlowe Inquest"
1986	The Theban Plays by Sophocles	Oedipus Rex	Theban Plays: Oedipus Rex
1987	The Return of Sherlock Holmes	Sherlock Holmes	TV film
1989	Summer's Lease	Hugh Pargeter	Miniseries
1993	Between the Lines	Thomas Wenleigh	2 episodes
1994	Degas and Pissarro Fall Out	Degas	Short
1995	Arena	Narrator	Episode: "The Peter Sellers Story"
1996	Cracker	Commander Gordon Ellison	Episode: "White Ghost"
1997	Kavanagh QC	Ralph Merridrew	Episode: "Diplomatic Baggage"
1997	Dalziel and Pascoe	Hartley Culpepper	Episode: "Ruling Passion"
2001	Dr. Terrible's House of Horrible	Priest	Episode: "Scream Satan Scream!"
2002-2003	Silent Witness	Various	3 episodes
2003	State of Play	Richard Siegler	1 episode
2003	The Bill	Judge Howard Sinclair	6 episodes
2003	Waking the Dead	Macintosh	Episode: "Breaking Glass"
2006-2008	Holby City	David Powell/Walter Noble	2 episodes
2007	Trial & Retribution	James Clayton Q.C.	Episode: "Mirror Image Part One"
2008	Lewis	Dr. Melville	Episode: "Life Born of Fire"
2008	The Tudors	Abbot	Episode: "Matters of State"
2013	The Escape Artist	Judge	Part One
2016	Father Brown	Bishop Reynard	Episode: "The Daughter of Autolycus"
2017	Endeavour	Professor Donald Bagley	Episode: "Harvest"
2022	Raised by Wolves	The Trust	5 episodes (voice role)

=== Radio ===
Year	Title	Role	Producer	Station	Notes
1982	Fahrenheit 451	Montag		BBC Radio 4	Gregory Evans's adaptation of Ray Bradbury's novel
1994	Parrots and Owls	John Ruskin	Jeremy Howe	BBC Radio 3	Play by John Purser

== Books ==
- Rossya: A Journey through Siberia (1977)
- Txèkhov – Un monòleg sobre la vida d'Anton Txèkhov (1989) (Catalan translation of Anton Chekhov) ISBN 84-297-2876-7
- The English Shakespeare Company – The Story of the Wars of the Roses (with Michael Bogdanov) (1990)
- Hamlet: A User's Guide (1996)
- Twelfth Night: A User's Guide (2000)
- Are You There, Crocodile? Inventing Anton Chekhov (2003)
- A Pocket Guide to Ibsen, Chekhov and Strindberg (2004)
- A Midsummer Night's Dream: A User's Guide (2005)
- Sweet William: Twenty Thousand Hours with Shakespeare (2012)
- Let Me Play the Lion Too – How to Be an Actor (2015)
- King Lear in Brooklyn (2016)

== Sources ==
- Sweet William: A User's Guide to Shakespeare Nick Hern books, Published 2012
