= Sherlock Holmes and the Man from Hell =

1997 novel by Barrie Roberts

- First edition
- Author: Barrie Roberts
- Language: English
- Genre: Mystery novels
- Publisher: Constable & Co.
- Publication date: 1997
- Media type: Print
- Pages: 208
- ISBN: 0-09-477090-5 (first paperback edition)

Sherlock Holmes and the Man from Hell is a 1997 Sherlock Holmes pastiche novel by Barrie Roberts. A key character in the story, Lord Backwater, is first mentioned in the short story, "The Noble Bachelor", also by Holmes creator Arthur Conan Doyle.

== Plot ==
Philanthropist Lord Backwater is found dead on his property. The police surmise that Backwater came upon some poachers which led to his murder. Holmes discounts this solution and undertakes his own investigation which leads to a hidden history of Backwater's time spent in a prison settlement on Van Diemen's Land.

== Reissue ==
Titan Books reprinted the book in 2010, as part of its Further Adventures series, which collects a number of noted Holmesian pastiches.

== Reception ==
Reviews of Sherlock Holmes and the Man from Hell have been largely positive. Publishers Weekly claimed that Roberts' writing was a successful "melding the brilliant thinker and the man of action".

Roger Johnson writing for the Sherlock Holmes Society of London stated that Roberts "has done his homework thoroughly" and "writes in a very acceptable simulacrum of Watson’s style". When Titan Books reissued the book, Lenny Picker called it a "classic pastiche".

== See also ==
- Sherlock Holmes pastiches
