= Sherlock Holmes and the Railway Maniac =

1994 novel by Barrie Roberts

- First edition
- Author: Barrie Roberts
- Language: English
- Genre: Mystery novels
- Publisher: Constable & Co.
- Publication date: 1994
- Media type: Print (paperback)
- ISBN: 0-7490-0546-7 (first paperback edition)

Sherlock Holmes and the Railway Maniac is a 1994 Sherlock Holmes pastiche novel by Barrie Roberts which pits Sherlock Holmes against an anarchist who is bombing trains.

The story involves real life incidents such as the siege of Sidney Street.

The events of the novel bookend the original Doyle story His Last Bow.

== Reception ==
Eric Monahan called the book a "first rate pastiche" while Roger Johnson stated that Roberts "captures the Watson-Doyle style better than most".
