= English Shakespeare Company =

Late-20th-century English theatre company

The English Shakespeare Company was an English theatre company founded in 1986 by Michael Bogdanov and Michael Pennington to present and promote the works of William Shakespeare on both a national and an international level. Funding came from the state Arts Council of Great Britain, and also commercially from the Allied Irish Bank and Canadian retail tycoon Ed Mirvish.

Its inaugural production (1986) was an anthology entitled The Henrys (Henry IV, Part 1, Henry IV, Part 2, and Henry V) which opened at the Theatre Royal, Plymouth in December 1986. A year later, several more plays (Richard II, Henry VI: House of Lancaster, Henry VI: House of York and Richard III) were added to the original productions and were presented as a complete history cycle under the title of The Wars of the Roses. The production toured for two years in seventeen venues in the UK including the Old Vic in London, as well as appearing at several international venues, including the Hong Kong Festival, opening the new Tokyo Globe Theatre, being the centrepiece of The 1988 International Theatre Festival of Chicago, and touring to Stamford, Connecticut, the Spoleto Festival, Melbourne, the Adelaide Festival, Brisbane, the Netherlands, Hamburg, Berlin and Frankfurt.

In addition to The Wars of the Roses, productions of many individual Shakespeare plays were also presented. They included Twelfth Night, Macbeth, The Tempest, Romeo & Juliet, Antony and Cleopatra, and As You Like It.

The last production of Romeo and Juliet, the closing production of the company, ended in Plymouth after touring the world.
