= John R. Ellis =

American visual effects artist

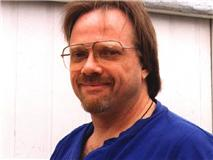
- Ellis in 1997
- Occupation: Visual effects artist

John R. Ellis is an American visual effects artist. He was nominated for an Academy Award in the category Best Visual Effects for the film Young Sherlock Holmes.

In addition to his Academy Award nomination, he won a Primetime Emmy Award in the category Outstanding Special Visual Effects for his work on the television film The Ewok Adventure.

== Selected filmography ==
- Young Sherlock Holmes (1985; co-nominated with Dennis Muren, Kit West and David W. Allen)
