= Michael Mallory =

American novelist (born 1955)

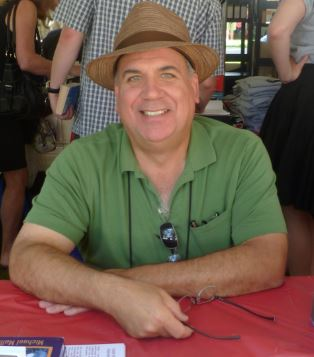
Michael Mallory in 2012

Michael Mallory (born 1955) is a writer on the subjects of animation and post-war pop culture, and the author of the books X-Men: The Characters and Their Universe, Universal Studios Monsters: A Legacy of Horror The Science Fiction Universe and Beyond, and Essential Horror Movies. As an animation and film historian, he has written over 600 articles, frequently for Variety, the Los Angeles Times and Animation Magazine, and has been featured in documentaries and DVD extras about animation. He co-authored the memoirs of animation legend Iwao Takamoto, which were published in 2009 as Iwao Takamoto: My Life with a Thousand Characters. He has also written the script for the annual Annie Awards ceremony, the Oscars of the animation industry, since the mid-1990s.

== Life ==
Mallory was born in Port Huron, Michigan, and was raised in Pontiac, Michigan. As a teenager, he appeared in summer stock plays with the Kenley Players and went on to receive a degree in speech, with a theatre/broadcasting emphasis, from Drury College (now Drury University) in Springfield, Missouri. After a stint as a radio newscaster in Springfield he relocated to Los Angeles to pursue an acting career. He made numerous appearances on the local stage and played bit roles in films such as Frances, Staying Alive and Eleanor: First Lady of the World (all 1982) and on television in Days of Our Lives, Santa Barbara and General Hospital, as well as a handful of commercials and industrial films. More recently, he has appeared on Mad Men, Vegas, and Mob City, in which he played Abe "Greenie" Greenberg, whose murder propels the plot of the series, Angie Tribeca, and NCIS. In the late 1980s, Mallory made writing his primary pursuit and for a while he served as a writer for Disneyland and other theme park venues. He scripted the large-format, 3-D attraction film Haunts of the Olde Country, which premiered at Busch Gardens in Williamsburg, Virginia, in 1993 and played there for several years. His 2009 book Universal Studios Monsters: A Legacy of Horror, a history of Universal horror film series, earned an honorable mention from the Rondo Hatton Classic Horror Awards, and Marvel: The Expanding Universe Wall Chart took the Silver 2009 Book of the Year Award from ForeWord Reviews. He lives with his wife in Glendale, California.

== Mystery writing ==
Mallory also writes murder mysteries, often featuring "Amelia Watson", the second (and previously unheralded) wife of Dr. Watson of Sherlock Holmes fame. Five volumes of Amelia Watson stories have appeared to date: the 2000 collection The Adventures of the Second Mrs. Watson, the 2004 novel Murder in the Bath, a second collection, The Exploits of the Second Mrs. Watson, published in 2008, a novel The Stratford Conspiracy, published in 2012, and a third collection, The Other Mrs. Watson, published in 2016 in England. A second series featuring Hollywood-based detective Dave Beauchamp began in 2013 with the novel Kill the Mother!. The most recent Dave Beauchamp adventure is Dig That Crazy Sphinx!, published in 2022. Mallory has written more than 190 short stories for adults and children, including a series of mysteries starring an eleven-year-old sleuth named "Scotty," which appeared periodically in the Los Angeles Times. He was the creator and co-editor (with Lisa Seidman and Rochelle Krich) of the mystery anthology Murder on Sunset Boulevard, which was published through the auspices of the Los Angeles chapter of the national organization, Sisters in Crime, and also co-edited (with Harley Jane Kozak and Nathan Walpow) its follow-up, LAndmarked for Murder. He was among the first recipients of a Derringer Award, winning in 1998 for Best Flash (short-short) Mystery Story, and his story "What the Cat Dragged In" was included in The Mysterious Bookshop Presents the Best American Mystery Stories, 2023, edited by Amor Towles and Otto Penzler. He has been nominated for a Pushcart Prize three times, for both fiction and nonfiction.

== Horror writing ==
Mallory has written horror stories for both young readers and adults. His novella Night Shocker was published in 1997 by Baronet Books as part of their "FrightTime" series, a string of books along the lines of the then-popular Goosebumps series. He contributed more short horror tales for kids for the "Chiller" page of the website MysteryNet.com. In 2012, he came out with his first horror novel for adults, The Mural, which is published by Borgo Press. A second horror thriller, The Book of Diagom was published under the pseudonym Gordon Turcott, but Mallory retained his original byline for The Ambulance.

== Journalism ==
Mallory has written more than 650 magazine, newspaper, and online articles about film, animation, and pop culture, for publications such as The Los Angeles Times, Variety, The Hollywood Reporter, Animation Magazine, Mystery Scene, and scores of others.

== Selected bibliography ==
=== Novels ===
- Freeze a Jolly Good Fellow!
- The Ambulance
- Dig That Crazy Sphinx!
- Ebenezer Scrooge and the Battle for Christmas
- The Book of Diagom (as Gordon Turcott)
- Bada-Bing, Bada-Tomb!
- Death Walks Skid Row
- Dead and In Person!
- Eats to Die For!
- Kill the Mother!
- The Mural
- The Stratford Conspiracy
- Murder in the Bath

=== Collections ===
- The Celebrated Clients of Sherlock Holems
- The Other Mrs. Watson
- The Exploits of the Second Mrs. Watson
- The Adventures of the Second Mrs. Watson

=== Nonfiction ===
- Hanna-Barbera Cartoons
- Marvel: The Characters and Their Universe
- X-Men: The Characters and Their Universe
- Marvel: The Expanding Universe Wall Chart
- Universal Studios Monsters: A Legacy of Horror
- Iwao Takamoto: My Life with a Thousand Characters (co-writer)
- The Science Fiction Universe and Beyond
- Essential Horror Movies
- The Art of Krampus
- The Vampire Diaries: Unlocking the Secrets of Mystic Falls
- Marvel's Black Widow

=== As editor ===
- LAndmarked for Murder (anthology)
- Murder on Sunset Boulevard (anthology)

=== Short stories ===
- "The Sacred White Elephant of Mandalay" (2010, published in Sherlock Holmes: The American Years)

== See also ==
- The Jetsons
