= Young Sherlock Holmes =

1985 film by Barry Levinson

- Theatrical release poster by Drew Struzan
- Directed by: Barry Levinson
- Screenplay by: Chris Columbus
- Based on: Characters by Sir Arthur Conan Doyle
- Produced by: Mark Johnson
- Starring: Nicholas Rowe; Alan Cox; Anthony Higgins; Sophie Ward; Roger Ashton-Griffiths; Freddie Jones; Nigel Stock; Brian Oulton; Susan Fleetwood
- Cinematography: Stephen Goldblatt
- Edited by: Stu Linder
- Music by: Bruce Broughton
- Production company: Amblin Entertainment
- Distributed by: Paramount Pictures
- Release date: December 4, 1985
- Running time: 109 minutes
- Country: United States
- Language: English
- Budget: $18 million
- Box office: $63.7 million

Young Sherlock Holmes (also known with the title card name of Young Sherlock Holmes and the Pyramid of Fear) is a 1985 American mystery adventure film directed by Barry Levinson and written by Chris Columbus, based on the characters created by Sir Arthur Conan Doyle. The film depicts a young Sherlock Holmes and John Watson meeting and solving a mystery together at a boarding school.

The film is notable for being the first full-length film to feature a completely computer-generated character, created by Lucasfilm's Pixar Computer Animation Group. This was a historical landmark in special effects history and influenced other CGI feature films such as Pixar's Toy Story.

Young Sherlock Holmes was released by Paramount Pictures on December 4, 1985 to positive reviews from critics and grossed $63.7 million against an $18 million budget. At the 58th Academy Awards, the film was nominated for Best Visual Effects (Dennis Muren, Kit West, John R. Ellis and David W. Allen).

== Plot ==
Following the closure of his old school in the countryside, a young John Watson is transferred to London's Brompton Academy, where Sherlock Holmes befriends him immediately. Holmes's mentors there include Rupert Waxflatter, an eccentric retired professor to whom the school has given a large attic space for his inventions, which include a flying machine. Waxflatter's niece Elizabeth Hardy and Holmes are in love.

Elsewhere in the city, a hooded figure with a blowpipe shoots Bentley Bobster and the Reverend Duncan Nesbitt with thorns that induce nightmarish hallucinations, causing their apparent suicides. Holmes brings his suspicions of foul play to Scotland Yard detective Lestrade, who rebuffs him.

After rival student Dudley, who is jealous of Holmes and Elizabeth, frames him for cheating on an exam, Holmes is expelled from Brompton. He has one last duel with Professor Rathe, the fencing instructor. While Holmes says goodbye to Watson, Waxflatter is shot with a thorn and stabs himself. Dying, he whispers the word "Eh-Tar" to Holmes.

Holmes, Watson and Elizabeth secretly investigate the murders, uncovering the existence of Rame-Tep, an ancient Egyptian cult of Osiris worshippers. The trio track the cult to a London paraffin warehouse and a secret underground wooden pyramid, where they interrupt the sacrifice of a young girl. The Rame-Tep shoot them with thorns and they escape to a cemetery to endure the hallucinations.

Back in Waxflatter's loft, Holmes and Watson find a drawing of six men, including the three victims and a fourth man, Chester Cragwitch, who is still alive. That night, Holmes and Watson go to see Cragwitch, who explains that in his youth, he and the other five men were in Egypt, where they looted an underground pyramid containing the tombs of five Egyptian princesses. The resulting protest was violently put down by the British Army. A local boy named Eh-Tar and his sister vowed to seek revenge for their parents' deaths in the protests, and replace the bodies of the five princesses with five British girls. As they return to the school, a chance remark by Watson causes Holmes to realize that Eh-Tar is none other than Professor Rathe.

Rathe and his sister, school nurse Mrs. Dribb, abduct Elizabeth to use as the final sacrifice. Using Waxflatter's flying machine, Holmes and Watson reach the warehouse just in time to rescue Elizabeth and burn the pyramid down. When Rathe tries to shoot Holmes, Elizabeth shields Holmes with her body and is mortally wounded. In a resulting duel, Rathe falls into the frozen River Thames. Holmes transfers to another school and Watson gives him an antique pipe that he bought during the investigations as a Christmas/farewell present.

An end-credits scene reveals that Rathe survived. Checking in at a hotel in Switzerland, he signs under a new name, "Moriarty", foreshadowing his role as Holmes' future nemesis.

== Cast ==
- Nicholas Rowe as Sherlock Holmes, the protagonist
- Alan Cox as John Watson, Holmes's assistant
  - Michael Hordern voices an older John Watson, who narrates the film.
- Sophie Ward as Elizabeth Hardy, Holmes's love interest
- Anthony Higgins as Rathe. Ostensibly a teacher at Brompton School, he is in fact the leader of the Rame Tep. At the end of the film, he is revealed to be Moriarty, Holmes's future archnemesis. Higgins would go on to play Holmes in the TV movie 1994 Baker Street: Sherlock Holmes Returns.
- Susan Fleetwood as Mrs Dribb, ostensibly the school nurse. She is Rathe/Eh-Tar's younger sister, his cult's second-in-command and chief assassin.
- Freddie Jones as Chester Cragwitch
- Nigel Stock as Rupert Waxflatter, Elizabeth's uncle. Stock had previously played Watson in the 1965-68 BBC television series.
- Roger Ashton-Griffiths as Inspector Lestrade
- Earl Rhodes as Dudley, Holmes's school rival
- Brian Oulton as Master Snelgrove, the boring chemistry teacher.
- Patrick Newell as Bentley Bobster
- Donald Eccles as the Reverend Duncan Nesbitt
- Nadim Sawalha as Egyptian Tavern Owner, who Holmes, Watson and Elizabeth consult during their investigations
- Roger Brierley as Mr. Holmes, an apparition of Sherlock's father
- Vivienne Chandler as Mrs. Holmes, an apparition of Sherlock's mother
- Walter Sparrow as Ethan Engel, Curiosity Shop Owner, who Holmes, Watson and Elizabeth consult during their investigations and sells Watson Holmes's pipe
- John Scott Martin as Cemetery Caretaker, who saves Holmes's life by frightening off a Rame Tep assassin
- Willoughby Goddard as School Chaplain, who officiates at Waxflatter's funeral
- Ralph Tabakin as Policeman in Shop Window, a policeman who observes Holmes and Watson using Professor Waxflatter's flying machine
- Nancy Nevinson as Hotel Receptionist, a woman who meets Rathe/Eh-Tar/Moriarty at the end of the film.

== Production ==
While the film is based on characters created by Sir Arthur Conan Doyle, the story is an original one penned by Chris Columbus. Though he admitted that he was "very worried about offending some of the Holmes purists", Columbus used the original Doyle stories as his guide. Of the creation of the film, Columbus stated:

"The thing that was most important to me was why Holmes became so cold and calculating, and why he was alone for the rest of his life," Mr. Columbus explains. "That's why he is so emotional in the film; as a youngster, he was ruled by emotion, he fell in love with the love of his life, and as a result of what happens in this film, he becomes the person he was later."

When Steven Spielberg came aboard the project as an executive producer, he wanted to make certain the script had the proper tone and captured the Victorian era. He first had noted Sherlockian John Bennett Shaw read the screenplay and provide notes. He then had English novelist Jeffrey Archer act as script doctor to anglicize the script and ensure authenticity.

The cast includes actors with previous associations to Sherlock Holmes. Nigel Stock, who played Professor Waxflatter, portrayed Dr. John Watson alongside both Douglas Wilmer and Peter Cushing in the BBC series of the 1960s. Patrick Newell, who played Bentley Bobster, played both PC Benson in 1965's A Study in Terror as well as Inspector Lestrade in 1979's Sherlock Holmes and Doctor Watson. As well, cast member Alan Cox's father, actor Brian Cox, would later have a connection: he would play Dr. Joseph Bell, the inspiration for Holmes, in the 2005 television film The Strange Case of Sherlock Holmes & Sir Arthur Conan Doyle.

Stop motion was used for the harpy sequence, while the pastry creatures that attack Watson (Cox) were rod puppets shot against a blue-screen. The pastries were live action, but filmed with fewer frames per second, sometimes as low as eight. The film is notable for including the first fully computer-generated photorealistic animated character, a knight composed of elements from a stained glass window. This effect was the first CG character to be scanned and painted directly onto film using a RGB laser. The effect was created by John Lasseter and Pixar, then a division of Lucasfilm.

The fencing scenes were shot at Penshurst Place in Kent. In the United Kingdom and Australia, the film was titled Young Sherlock Holmes and the Pyramid of Fear; while in Italian Pyramid of Fear (Piramide di paura), in Spanish and in French The Secret of the Pyramid (El secreto de la pirámide, Le secret de la pyramide) and in German The Secret of the Hidden Temple (Das Geheimnis des verborgenen Tempels), which contained no hint to Sherlock Holmes.

== Music ==
The film music was composed and conducted by Bruce Broughton, who has a long-standing history of scoring orchestral film soundtracks.

MCA track listing:

1. "Main Title" (1:58)
2. "Solving the Crime" (4:53)
3. "Library Love/Waxflatter's First Flight" (2:23)
4. "Pastries & Crypts" (5:44)
5. "Waxing Elizabeth" (3:35)
6. "Holmes and Elizabeth – Love Theme" (1:54)
7. "Ehtar's Escape" (4:02)
8. "The Final Duel" (3:51)
9. "Final Farewell" (1:53)
10. "The Riddle Solved/End Credits" (6:25)

Intrada track listing, with tracks on the original release in bold:

Disc 1

1. "The First Victim" (2:57)
2. "The Old Hat Trick" (1:45)
3. **"Main Title"** (2:01)
4. "Watson's Arrival" (1:03)
5. "The Bear Riddle" (:46)
6. **"Library Love/Waxflatter's First Flight"** (2:54)
7. "Fencing with Rathe" (1:07)
8. "The Glass Soldier" (3:22)
9. **"Solving the Crime"** (4:54)
10. "Second Attempt" (1:11)
11. "Cold Revenge" (4:08)
12. "Waxflatter's Death" (3:38)
13. "The Hat" (1:21)
14. **"Holmes and Elizabeth – Love Theme"** (1:58)

Disc 2

1. "Getting the Point" (6:25)
2. "Rame Tep" (3:06)
3. **"Pastries and Crypts"** (6:44)
4. "Discovered by Rathe" (5:05)
5. "To Cragwitch's" (1:32)
6. "The Explanation" (1:48)
7. "Cragwitch Goes Again" (1:23)
8. "It's You!" (6:17)
9. **"Waxing Elizabeth"** (3:37)
10. "Temple Fire" (3:24)
11. **"Ehtar's Escape (Revised Version)"** (4:04)
12. **"Duel and Final Farewell"** (5:41)
13. **"The Riddles Solved and End Credits"** (6:27)
14. "Ytrairom Spelled Backwards" (:48)
15. "Main Title (Film Version)" (1:42)
16. "Belly Dancer" (1:02)
17. "Waxing Elizabeth (Chorus)" (3:01)
18. "Waxing Elizabeth (Orchestra)" (3:37)
19. "Ehtar's Escape (Original Version)" (4:03)
20. "God Rest Ye Merry, Gentlemen" (arr. Bruce Broughton) (01:06)

== Reception ==
=== Box office ===
The film was a box office disappointment domestically, grossing $19.7 million against an $18 million budget and ranking 46th for the year at the box office. Internationally it performed better, grossing $44 million for a worldwide total of $63.7 million.

=== Critical response ===
On Rotten Tomatoes the film has an approval rating of 70% based on reviews from 23 critics. The site's consensus states: "Young Sherlock Holmes is a charming, if unnecessarily flashy, take on the master sleuth." On Metacritic the film has a score of 65% based on reviews from 15 critics.

Roger Ebert gave the film 3 out of 4 stars, and wrote: "The elaborate special effects also seem a little out of place in a Sherlock Holmes movie, although I'm willing to forgive them because they were fun." Gene Siskel of the Chicago Tribune wrote: "The production is first-rate in all technical ways imaginable, but the villain that Holmes and Watson chase is not worth their intellect or time or ours."Christopher Null of Filmcritic.com called the film "great fun". Reviewing the film for The New York Times, Leslie Bennetts called it "a lighthearted murder mystery that weds Sir Arthur Conan Doyle to the kind of rollicking action-adventure that has made Steven Spielberg the most successful movie maker in the world".

Colin Greenland reviewed Young Sherlock Holmes for White Dwarf #77, and stated that "Conan Doyle's creation is reduced to an irritating sequence of in-jokes about deerstalkers, violins and pipes. Instead of sleuthing we get swashbuckling in the blazing temple and swordplay on the frozen Thames; creditable acting, but a crass production from start to finish." John Nubbin reviewed Young Sherlock Holmes for Different Worlds magazine and stated that "Paramount Pictures has done an admirable job with the version of a young Holmes which they freely admit has been cut from whole cloth [...] they built a solid premise, constructed nothing but authentic settings for it, and people it with characters one has no trouble believing in."

Pauline Kael wrote, "This sounds like a funnier, zestier picture than it turns out to be. ... As long as the movie stays within the conceits of the Holmesian legends, it's mildly, blandly amusing. But when one of the imperilled old men gives an elaborate account of the background of the villainy ... your mind drifts and you lose the plot threads. And when the picture forsakes fog and coziness and the keenness of Holmes' intellect – when it starts turning him into a dashing action-adventure hero – the jig is up. ... the movie lets you down with a thump when Holmes and his companions enter a wooden pyramid-temple hidden under the London streets. ... There's a resounding hollowness at the center of this picture – Levinson's Temple of Doom".

R.L. Shaffer writing for IGN in 2010, felt the film "doesn't hold up all that well" and that ultimately "the film shall remain a cult classic – loved by some, but forgotten by most." DVD Verdict stated that the film was both "a reimagining of the detective's origin story, but it is also respectful of Arthur Conan Doyle's work" and "a joy from beginning to end."

=== Awards ===
- 58th Academy Awards – Academy Award For Visual Effects - Dennis Muren, Kit West, John R. Ellis and David W. Allen (nominated)
- 13th Saturn Awards – Saturn Award for Best Music - Bruce Broughton (won)

== Video game ==
A video game based on the film was released in 1987 for the MSX called Young Sherlock: The Legacy of Doyle released exclusively in Japan by Pack-In-Video. Although the game is based on the film, the plot of the game had little to do with the film's story.
