= 1994 Baker Street: Sherlock Holmes Returns =

1993 television film directed by Kenneth Johnson

- Genre: Comedy; Crime; Mystery
- Based on: Sherlock Holmes by Arthur Conan Doyle
- Written by: Kenneth Johnson
- Directed by: Kenneth Johnson
- Starring: Anthony Higgins; Debrah Farentino; Ken Pogue; Kerry Sandomirsky
- Music by: James Di Pasquale
- Country of origin: United States
- Original language: English

Production
- Executive producers: Kenneth Johnson; Daniel Grodnik; Jon Slan
- Cinematography: Ken Orieux
- Editor: David Strohmaier
- Running time: 96 minutes
- Production companies: Kenneth Johnson Productions; Paragon Entertainment Corporation

Original release
- Network: CBS
- Release: September 12, 1993

1994 Baker Street: Sherlock Holmes Returns, or Sherlock Holmes Returns! In The Adventure of the Tiger's Revenge and sometimes shortened to just Sherlock Holmes Returns, is a 1993 American television movie about the fictional detective Sherlock Holmes, starring Anthony Higgins as Holmes. In its title and basic premise, it is very similar to a 1987 TV movie, The Return of Sherlock Holmes, but the plot details of the two films are quite different.

== Plot ==
Sherlock Holmes is awakened in modern times from suspended animation as a result of an earthquake. He is aided in his recovery by Dr. Amy Winslow, who lives in Baker Street in San Francisco. Holmes pits his wits against the descendants of the Moriarty family, led by James Moriarty Booth. He is also aided by a new group of Baker Street Irregulars led by Zapper.

== Cast ==
- Anthony Higgins as Sherlock Holmes
- Debrah Farentino as Amy Winslow
- Ken Pogue as James Moriarty Booth
- Kerry Sandomirsky as Mrs. Ortega
- Mark Adair-Rios as Zapper

== Production ==
It was written and directed by Kenneth Johnson, and was broadcast on CBS. Higgins had previously played Professor Moriarty in Young Sherlock Holmes (1985). The television film was intended to lead to an ongoing series featuring Sherlock Holmes and Doctor Winslow.

== Reception ==
Variety described the film as "derivative premise, thin content and production values, awkward dialogue...and consistent overacting."

== Home media ==
The film was released on DVD in Germany for Region 2 by PIDAX FILM.

== Novelisation ==
In 2022, the film's writer-director Kenneth Johnson released a novel based on the film entitled Holmes Coming, with the setting updated to the 2020s.
