= Anthony Higgins (actor) =

British actor

- Higgins in the trailer for Taste the Blood of Dracula (1970)
- Born: 9 May 1947 (age 79); Northampton, Northamptonshire, England
- Other name: Anthony Corlan
- Occupation: Actor
- Years active: 1968–present
- Spouse: Heide Lausen

Anthony Higgins (born 9 May 1947) is an English stage, film and television actor. His credits include A Walk with Love and Death (1969), Taste the Blood of Dracula (1970), Hadleigh (1976), The Eagle of the Ninth (1977), Love in a Cold Climate (1980), Quartet (1981), The Draughtsman's Contract (1982), Lace (1984), The Bride (1985), Young Sherlock Holmes (1985), Napoleon and Josephine: A Love Story (1987), Sherlock Holmes Returns (1993), Nostradamus (1994), Peak Practice (2000), Chromophobia (2005), Heroes and Villains: Napoleon (2007), Lewis (2009), Malice in Wonderland (2009), Bel Ami (2012), and Tutankhamun (2016).

== Early life ==
Higgins was born in Northampton, England. He started acting in school and Cosmopolitan Club theatre plays, taking the lead in Treasure Island, Sweeney Todd, and The Beggar's Uproar. After graduation he studied at the school of the Birmingham Repertory Theatre Company.

== Career ==
In 1967 he became a professional stage actor. He performed as Romeo in Romeo and Juliet at Birmingham Repertory. He worked onstage in Coventry and at the Chichester Festival in Chichester. One of his first television appearances was a pivotal role in a 1968 episode of the TV series Journey to the Unknown, with Janice Rule. Another television appearance was in Strange Report (1969), with Anthony Quayle. Higgins's first successes in cinema were: A Walk with Love and Death, by John Huston with Anjelica Huston (1969), Something for Everyone (1970), with Michael York and Angela Lansbury, Taste the Blood of Dracula (1970), with Christopher Lee, and a cult film Vampire Circus (1972).

In all the films of his early career until 1975, Higgins was credited as 'Anthony Corlan' due to the similarity of his real name to that of another actor.

There followed a period of television and plays for the Royal Shakespeare Company, the National Theatre, and other British theatre productions. In 1970 he played Boris in the BBC TV series The Roads to Freedom, based on the Jean-Paul Sartre trilogy. In 1976 he played a supporting role in a popular British television series, Hadleigh. In 1977 he played the lead role in a BBC series The Eagle of the Ninth, based on Rosemary Sutcliff's 1954 book. In 1980 he was Juan in Love in a Cold Climate, and in 1981 played the supporting role of Major Gobler in the feature film, Raiders of the Lost Ark, starring Harrison Ford and directed by Steven Spielberg. Higgins won Best Actor of 1979 from Time Out magazine for his work with the Royal Shakespeare Company that year.

Higgins played the role of Stephan in the American film production of Quartet, opposite French actress Isabelle Adjani in 1981. In the same year the British director Peter Greenaway chose Higgins for the leading role in his breakthrough film The Draughtsman's Contract. In 1985 Higgins appeared as the cuckolded husband in Nagisa Oshima's Max mon amour with Charlotte Rampling. In 1985 he acted opposite Sting in The Bride, a version of Bride of Frankenstein. Throughout the 1980s Higgins appeared in supporting roles in many television series such as Lace, Napoleon and Josephine: A Love Story, with Armand Assante, and Reilly, Ace of Spies, with Sam Neill. He went to Australia to play the lead as Sir Laurence Olivier in an Australian made-for-television film, Darlings of the Gods, about the time spent in Australia by Olivier and Vivien Leigh.

In 1991 Higgins played Johann Strauss I in the Austrian-produced, made-for-television series, The Strauss Dynasty, which was filmed in Austria with many well-known actors and aired internationally. He played both Sherlock Holmes and Holmes' enemy Professor Moriarty, in two different decades of his career. He was the villain Rathe (not yet going by the name Moriarty) in Young Sherlock Holmes (1985), and played Sherlock Holmes himself in Sherlock Holmes Returns (1993). In 1993 he played a lead part in the film Sweet Killing. In 2005 he appeared in Chromophobia. He played General Jacques Francois Dugommier in 2007 in Heroes and Villains: Napoleon. In 2009 he appeared in Lewis, Law & Order: UK, and Agatha Christie's Marple ("The Secret of Chimneys").

== Filmography ==
=== Film ===
- A Walk with Love and Death (1969) as Robert of Loris (as Anthony Corlan)
- Taste the Blood of Dracula (1970) as Paul Paxton (as Anthony Corlan)
- Something for Everyone (1970) as Helmuth Von Ornstein (as Anthony Corlan)
- Vampire Circus (1972) as Emil (as Anthony Corlan)
- Flavia the Heretic (1974) as Ahmed (as Anthony Corlan)
- Voyage of the Damned (1976) as Seaman Heinz Berg
- Quartet (1981) as Stephan Zelli
- Raiders of the Lost Ark (1981) as Major Gobler
- The Draughtsman's Contract (1982) as Mr. Neville
- The Bride (1985) as Clerval
- She'll Be Wearing Pink Pyjamas (1985) as Tom
- Young Sherlock Holmes (1985) as Professor Rathe
- Max mon amour (1986) as Peter Jones
- The Bridge (1992) as Reginald Hetherington
- Sweet Killing (1993) as Adam Crosse
- For Love or Money (1993) as Christian Hanover
- Nostradamus (1994) as King Henry II
- Indian Summer (1996) as Ramon
- The Fifth Province (1997) as Marcel
- Bandyta (1997) as Prison's Director
- Deeply (2000) as Adm. Griggs
- The Last Minute (2001) as Walsh
- Chromophobia (2005) as Geoffrey Wharton
- Malice in Wonderland (2009) as Rex
- Bel Ami (2012) as Comte de Vaudrec
- United Passions (2014) as Lord Kinnaird

=== Television ===
- The Golden Dart (1968) (as Anthony Corlan) as Jonathan
- Blood of the Lamb (1969) (as Anthony Corlan) as Alec
- The Roads to Freedom (1970) as Boris
- Armchair Theatre (1972) as Adolph
- The Rivals of Sherlock Holmes (1973) as William Hazeldene
- Hadleigh (1976) as Gregory Baker
- Wings (1977) as Lt. Wollerton
- The Eagle of the Ninth (1977) as Marcus Flavius Aquila
- Danton's Death (1978) as Camille
- Love in a Cold Climate (1980) as Juan
- Tales of the Unexpected (1983) as Cassan
- Reilly, Ace of Spies (1983) as Trilisser
- Lace (1984) as Prince Abdullah
- The Cold Room (1984) as Erich
- Lace II (1985) as King Abdullah of Sydon
- The Shutter Falls (1986) as Photographer
- The Last Seance (1986) as Raoul
- Napoleon and Josephine: A Love Story (1987) as Joseph
- Darlings of the Gods (1989) as Laurence Olivier
- The Strauss Dynasty (1991) as Johann Strauss
- One Against the Wind (1991) as SS Capt. Herman Gruber
- 1994 Baker Street: Sherlock Holmes Returns (1993) as Sherlock Holmes
- The Governor (1995) as Norman Jones
- Moses (1995) as Korah
- Supply & Demand (1997) as Lloyd St John
- Close Relations (1998) as Robert
- Trial & Retribution III (1999) as Karl Wilding
- Peak Practice (2000) as Paul Redman
- The Inspector Lynley Mysteries: A Traitor to Memory (2004) as James Pitchley
- Judge John Deed (2005) as Sir Maurice Avebury
- The Commander: Blackdog (2005) as David Sperry
- Heroes and Villains: Napoleon (2007) as General Dugommier
- Lewis (2009) as Franco
- Law & Order: UK (2009) as Ed Connor
- Marple (2010) as Count Ludwig
- Zen (2011) as Eduardo Guerchini
- The Curse of Edgar Hoover (2013) as Clyde Tolson
- Tutankhamun (2016) as Theodore Davis
