= Barrie Roberts =

English author (1939–2007)

Barrie Roberts (Hampshire, 1939 – 2007) was an English author, folk singer, freelance journalist, and criminal lawyer.

== Biography ==
Born in Hampshire in 1939, Roberts was educated at Churcher's College.

As a lawyer, Roberts worked for two firms in the West Midlands and at one he was a part of the appeal for the Birmingham Six. As an instructor, Roberts taught courses on Ghosts and Unsolved Mysteries and has also lectured on the Assassination of President John F. Kennedy.

Roberts was a member of the Gypsy council and interested himself in the treatment of Gypsies and other travellers.

== Bibliography ==
=== Chris Tyroll ===
- Victory Snapshot (1997)
- Robbery With Malice (1999)
- Bad Penny Blues (2000)
- Crowner & Justice (2002)

=== Further Adventures of Sherlock Holmes ===
==== Novels ====
- Sherlock Holmes and the Railway Maniac (1994)
- Sherlock Holmes and the Devil's Grail (1995)
- Sherlock Holmes and the Man from Hell (1997)
- Sherlock Holmes and the Royal Flush (1998)
- Sherlock Holmes and the Harvest Of Death (1999)
- Sherlock Holmes and the Crosby Murder (2001)
- Sherlock Holmes and the Rule of Nine (2003)
- Sherlock Holmes and the King's Governess (2005)
- Sherlock Holmes and the American Angels (2007)

==== Short stories ====
- The Disappearance of Daniel Question (The Strand Magazine #4 2000)
- The Abbus Parva Tragedy: The Mystery of the Christmas Pie (The Strand Magazine Christmas 2001)
- The Affair of the Christmas Jewel (The Strand Magazine Christmas 2002)
- The Affair of the Christmas Candle (The Strand Magazine Christmas 2003)
- The Mystery of the Addleton Curse (The Mammoth Book of New Sherlock Holmes Adventures)
- The Affair of the Weeping Child (Unpublished)Personal Correspondence

=== Non-fiction ===
- Midland Ghosts and Hauntings (1994)
- Midland Murders and Mysteries (1997)
- Midland Spirits and Spectres (1998)
- Murder in the Midlands (2000)
- A Taste of Murder (2004)
