= Sherlock Holmes Versus Arsène Lupin =

2007 video game

- European cover art
- Developer: Frogwares
- Publishers: Frogwares; Focus Home Interactive
- Designer: Jalil Amr
- Series: Sherlock Holmes
- Platform: Microsoft Windows
- Release: FRA: 25 October 2007; NA: 14 April 2008; UK: 9 March 2008
- Genre: Adventure
- Mode: Single-player

Sherlock Holmes Versus Arsène Lupin (released in North America, the United Kingdom and Australia as Sherlock Holmes: Nemesis and as Sherlock Holmes contre Arsène Lupin in France) is an adventure game developed by Frogwares. The fourth game in the Sherlock Holmes series, it was released for Windows in October 2007 and is distributed by Focus Home Interactive. It was preceded in 2002 by Sherlock Holmes: The Mystery of the Mummy, in 2004 by Sherlock Holmes: The Case of the Silver Earring and in 2007 by Sherlock Holmes: The Awakened.

== Plot ==
In July 1895, Sherlock Holmes and Dr. Watson receive a letter from the legendary French gentleman thief Arsène Lupin. Lupin threatens to steal five of England's most prized treasures in hopes to humble the "vanity" of the English, and leaves a riddle containing information on what his first crime will be. Holmes and Watson determine that the theft will take place at the National Gallery, and upon arriving there deduce that the object will be The Fighting Temeraire, which is symbolic of Britain's victory over France and Spain in the Battle of Trafalgar. They alert the Museum Director and Inspector Lestrade who has the Gallery guarded at every entrance. However, the next morning, they find the guards knocked out and the painting stolen. Holmes learns that Lupin disguised himself as a visiting French painter, and hid before Lestrade arrived. Lupin leaves behind a letter with a clue as to where he will strike next.

Holmes and Watson head to the Tower of London, where they believe Lupin will steal the ravens. They arrived too late, as the ravens are reported missing and replaced with other individual birds and a bat which have been let loose. They capture the animals and find pieces of paper attached to them. From the messages in the papers, Holmes deduces what Lupin will do next. Holmes and Watson meet with Lestrade and the Prime Minister at the British Museum where Holmes informs them that Lupin intends to steal the Rosetta Stone, which was taken by Britain from the French. Lestrade once again has the Museum guarded at every entrance but Lupin still manages to steal the stone right in front of them using ropes. He leaves behind yet another letter.

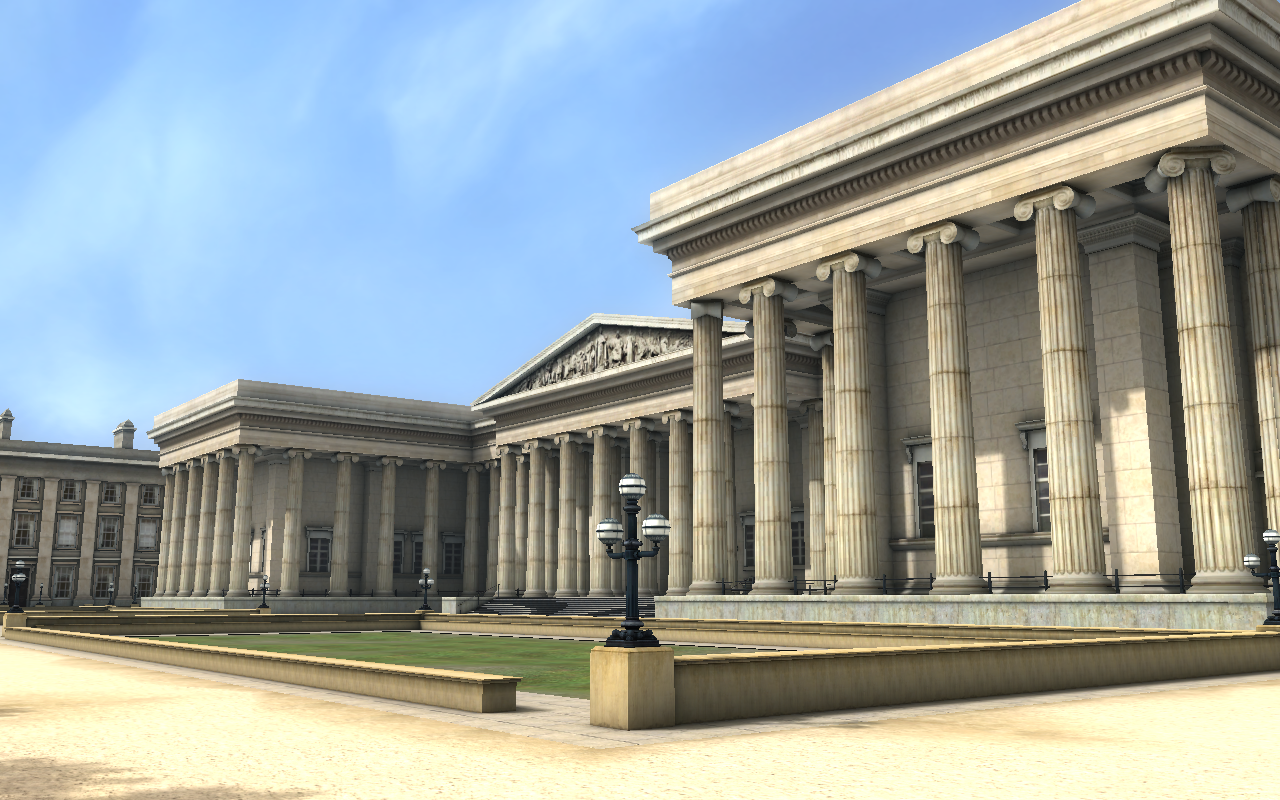
The British Museum as it appears in the game

Holmes determines that someone had unwittingly helped Lupin pass the security system. Unknown to him, Watson had befriended a man claiming to be a journalist, whom he helped into the museum to pay him back for some favours. Watson soon confesses and Holmes deduces, to his horror, that Lupin's next target will be Queen Victoria herself. At Buckingham Palace, Holmes and Watson find that the Prime Minister has had the place guarded heavily. Holmes learns that a French grandfather clock (which has a cupboard) was delivered to the queen's chamber and correctly deduces that Lupin made it to the queen. Lupin, however, does not hurt her but asks for a kiss which she obliges. She then allows him to use her secret corridor to escape. Holmes pursues Lupin but only manages to find another letter which clues to his next and final crime.

The Prime Minister congratulates Holmes and Watson for their role in protecting the Queen and asks Watson to decipher Lupin's message. Watson initially deduces that the next crime will be at the Tower of London but the Prime Minister reminds him that Lupin already struck there. Watson then determines that the final target will be Big Ben. Watson joins the Prime Minister, Lestrade and much of Scotland Yard to wait for Lupin there but Holmes goes to the Tower of London. He learns that Lupin's past four crimes were distractions from his real target, the Crown Jewels. Holmes sabotages Lupin's plan and confronts him. The two express their mutual admiration. Lupin agrees to return the stolen items and Holmes lets him go, knowing they will not see each other again. Holmes later tells Watson not to write about this endeavor.

== Gameplay ==
Sherlock Holmes Versus Arsène Lupin is an adventure played from a first person perspective. The player character for the majority of the game is Holmes, though some sections feature Watson and one features Inspector Lestrade. Most of the areas in which the game takes place are based on famous London landmarks, including the National Gallery and British Museum, the former of which features scanned copies of dozens of famous paintings, as well as numerous historical artifacts. Solving the mysteries of the game involve examining locations and discovering clues.

Retaining the first-person interface and gameplay of The Awakened, the game follows Holmes and Watson as Holmes as they try to stop Lupin. It is the first in the series to feature a cat-and-mouse style plot, a structure which would be retained for Sherlock Holmes Versus Jack the Ripper.

== Remastered edition ==
Frogwares released a remastered version of the game in May 2010. This version adds the option of a third-person perspective, as well as walking animations for the sections of the game in which Holmes and Watson are together. The version of the game downloadable from Steam and GOG has been updated to include these changes as well.

== Reception ==
Reception

Aggregate scores
Aggregator	Score
GameRankings	73.41%
Metacritic	71%

Review scores
Publication	Score
GameSpot	6.0 of 10
GamesRadar+	5/10
GameZone	7.3/10
IGN	7.0 of 10

The first four Sherlock Holmes titles from Frogwares—Mummy, Silver Earring, The Awakened and Nemesis—totaled roughly 1.5 million global sales by February 2009.

Sherlock Holmes Versus Arsène Lupin has received mixed reviews on review aggregator Metacritic, with a score of 71 out of 100. GameSpot criticised the game's "obtuse puzzles". IGN recommended the game for hardcore adventure fans that will entertain them for hours, but criticised the need to backtrack often.

Note has also been made of a prominent element in the areas in which player plays as Holmes: in the original release, Watson does not have a walking animation, resulting in a "creepy" Watson who apparently always stands still when in view, but seems to silently teleport closer when the player looks away. "Creepy" Watson became a viral meme after YouTuber tdous uploaded a video of himself playing the game's demo. To promote Sherlock Holmes: Crimes & Punishments, Frogwares made a short video entitled "Crimes & Punishments – The Return of Creepy Watson" which recreates Creepy Watson in their new game engine.
