= The Testament of Sherlock Holmes =

2012 video game

- The Testament of Sherlock Holmes cover art
- Developer: Frogwares (Note: Ported to PlayStation 3 and Xbox 360 by Spiders)
- Publisher: Frogwares; Focus Home Interactive: NA: Atlus
- Series: Sherlock Holmes
- Platforms: PlayStation 3; Windows; Xbox 360; Nintendo Switch; PlayStation 4
- Release: Windows, PS3, Xbox 360: EU: 20 September 2012; NA: 25 September 2012; AU: 27 September 2012; Nintendo Switch: WW: 9 March 2023; PlayStation 4: WW: 29 June 2023
- Genre: Adventure
- Mode: Single-player

The Testament of Sherlock Holmes is an adventure video game in the Sherlock Holmes series developed by Frogwares and distributed by Focus Home Interactive. After being delayed from an original 2010 release, the game was released in September 2012 for Xbox 360, PlayStation 3, and Windows.

The game was developed primarily for consoles, and features a new graphic engine and gameplay mechanics. It is based on the fictional detective Sherlock Holmes, the protagonist of 56 short stories and 4 novels by Arthur Conan Doyle. Like many other games in the series, the game itself presents an original story and plot that is not based on any of Doyle's works. The Testament of Sherlock Holmes is set in the London of 1898 between the events of Sherlock Holmes: Crimes & Punishments and Sherlock Holmes: The Devil's Daughter, with Holmes presented as the main suspect in a case in which he is unable to prove his innocence; thus he must play a dangerous game to uncover the truth.

== Plot ==
In London, 1898, a newspaper article accuses Holmes of the theft of a priceless set of jewels. With no solid evidence, Inspector Baynes says he will investigate further.

Holmes tells Watson he has an immediate appointment with the Bishop of Knightsbridge. Upon arriving, he discovers that the bishop has been tied up, burnt and mutilated. Holmes deduces that the culprits had been low class workers, who had been hired and given a special poison that caused a form of psychotic madness.

Holmes goes to the prison in order to interview Hans Schielman, a convicted poisoner. A fire begins in the cellblocks, during which Schielman escapes. It is implied that Holmes helped him escape in return for information about the poisoning case. Holmes and Watson discover the poison was administered through tainted opium from an opium den in Whitechapel.

Holmes wants to question the Bishop's nephew, Henry. With the help of tracking dog Toby, they track Henry to his hideout at the Wharf and find him within a smelting plant. Henry holds Holmes at gunpoint, but Toby accidentally knocks him into a vat of molten metal, killing him.

With the trail dead, Holmes returns to the theft of the necklace. Holmes breaks into the office of Oliver Farley, a journalist who seems intent on proving Holmes is a fraud. Using his deductive powers, Holmes discovers that Farley has recently been visited by local judge Sir Coutes Beckett. Holmes and Watson break into Beckett's house. Holmes leaves a mysterious package on Beckett's desk. They discover that Beckett has a collection of evidence against Holmes, making Watson suspicious. Watson spots Beckett and insists on talking to him. Holmes says that he is leaving, but Watson stays, and approaches the house, which suddenly explodes, causing Watson to be knocked out cold.

Holmes disappears, and is now wanted for questioning about the explosion. Watson finds Holmes hiding at a rented room in Whitechapel. Holmes tells Watson he is heading out of the city to continue the investigation. They arrive at a sawmill inhabited by three Russian anarchists. One of them warns that Sherlock Holmes is dangerous and shouldn't be trusted. Baynes and the police arrive to look for Holmes. Watson informs them Holmes is upstairs. Baynes goes after him alone and is soon thrown from the window.

Now branded a murderer, Holmes stages his own death and goes back into hiding. Watson tracks him down, where Holmes reveals everything he knows. Professor Moriarty has been plotting to cause panic by poisoning the poor of London, thus destabilising the government and creating a massive power vacuum, which Moriarty would fill with a puppet ruler loyal only to him. Knowing Holmes was the only one that could stop his plan, Moriarty recruited Inspector Baynes to help discredit him. As Judge Beckett had started growing suspicious of Baynes' evidence against Holmes, Moriarty ordered his home bombed to further frame Holmes.

Holmes and Watson go to Moriarty's hideout, where they discover the three Russian anarchists have made bombs that will go off via radio transmitter at key locations including Scotland Yard. Holmes learns that Moriarty is not in control of the scheme. After disconnecting the bombs from the radio transmitter, Holmes and Watson use another bomb to destroy the factory. It is revealed that Schielman was the power behind Moriarty. Under the influence of his own poison, Schielman attacks Moriarty and savagely bites at his throat. Moriarty shoots him, but is too late to save himself. With his dying breath, Moriarty asks Holmes to take care of his daughter, as he is the only one worthy to teach her. Holmes takes the child and treats her as his own, giving her an education and new life. In turn, he finally has a family of his own.

== Development ==
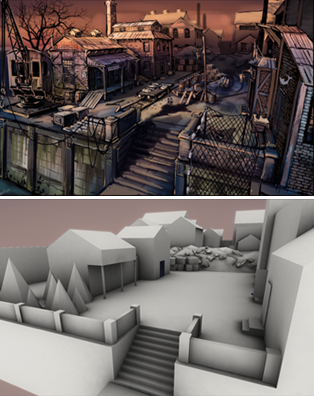
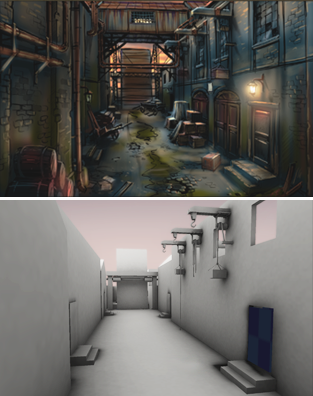
Development of the graphics from 2D sketches to 3D modelling

After the release of the ported Sherlock Holmes Versus Jack the Ripper, Frogwares and French publisher Focus Home Interactive got feedback from console players in particular that they wanted more adventure games with 3D graphics and production values to match what other genres are offering. Frogwares admitted to be eager in delivering one, though Waël Amr, the CEO, insisted on not forgetting about PC players, as some speculated. The development of the game took nearly three years to complete.

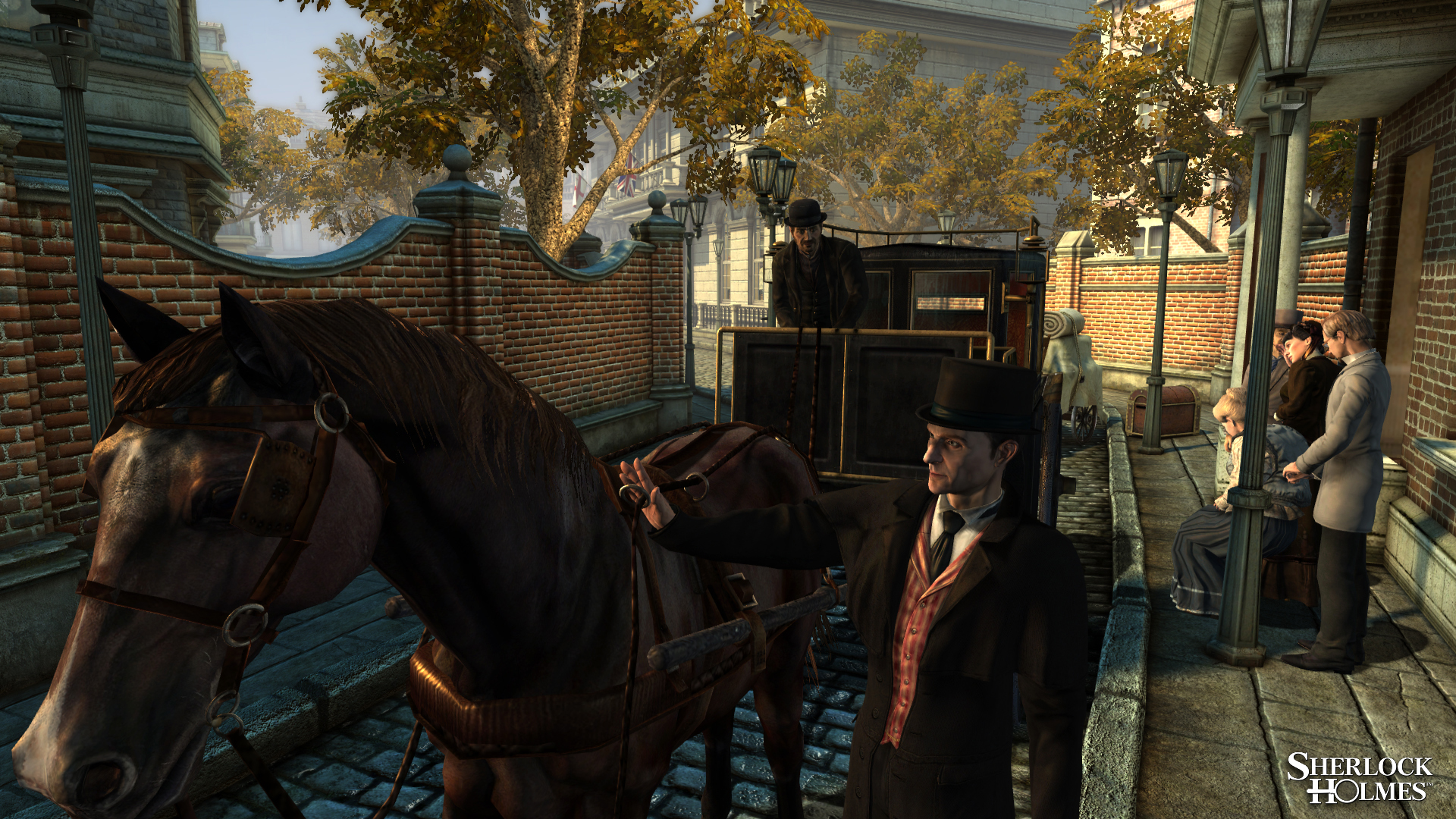

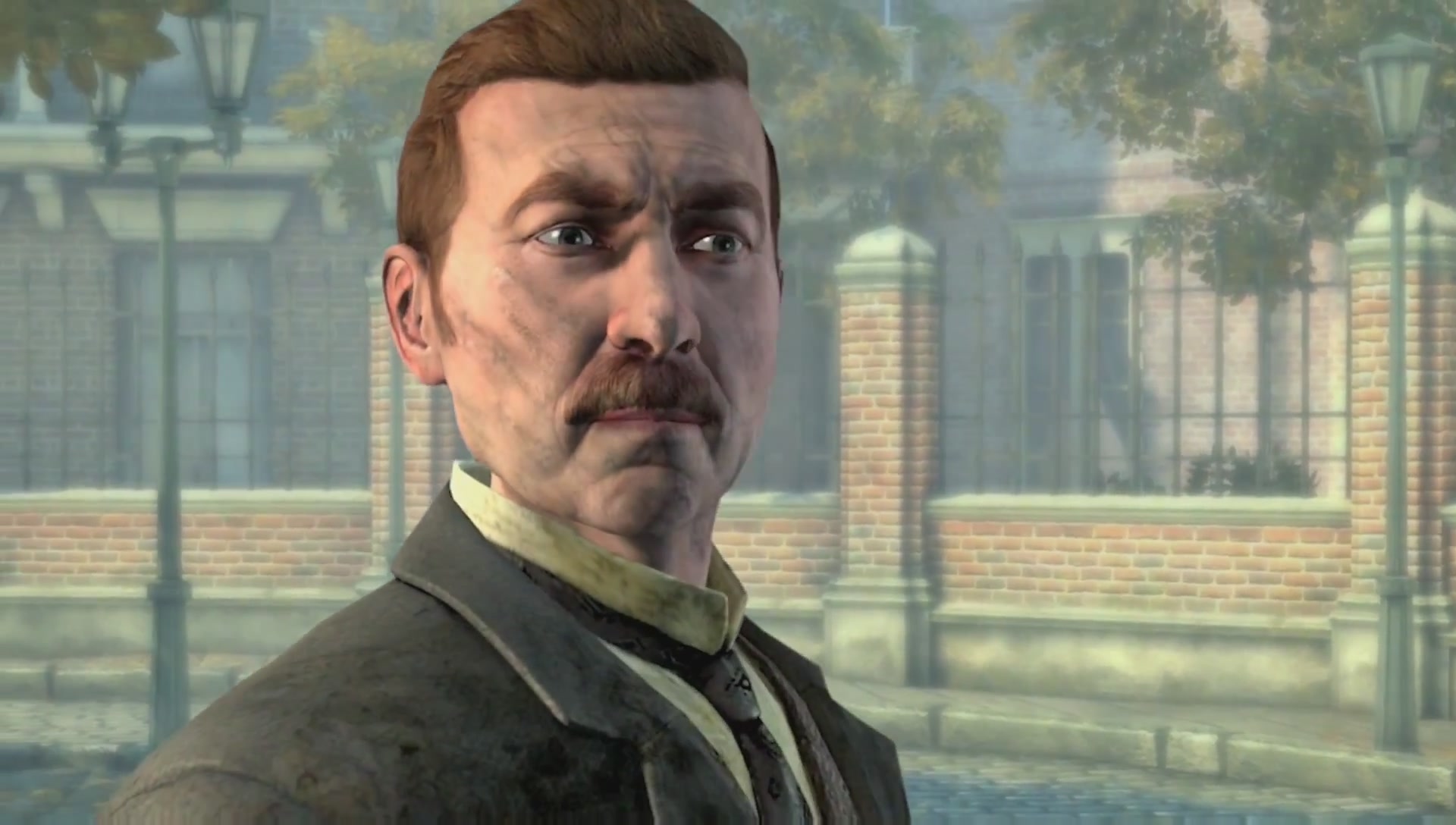
Screenshots showing the game's improved graphics compared to previous games of the series

Waël Amr explained that in the past, the team has always been limited in reaching the PC market by trying to aim for a middle ground with PC owners, so that the specs have been lowered to match the greater share of the market. With this latest game being developed with the then current generation of consoles in mind, the development team was able to focus on polishing the graphics and creating the adventure game they'd always wanted to.

The previous game in the series, Sherlock Holmes versus Jack the Ripper, was ported to console, but was simply a conversion. Rather than being ported from a PC version of the title, the team developed the title specifically for Xbox 360 and PlayStation 3 for the first time.

Sherlock Holmes versus Jack the Ripper used drawings to depict its murder victims, hiding the full horror of the scenes out of respect for the real historical victims. Frogwares in the new title approaches on more mature and graphic moments. As the characters here are purely fictional, there is no restraint in showing the gory scenes.

With this, they first upgraded the graphics, and was first previewed in the screenshots. These images were released by Frogwares to every gaming website, most notably GameSpot and IGN. The first of these were posted in February 2011, and more surfaces the following months. After the release of the first trailer and gameplay in E3 2011, Frogwares later released 4 more trailers with gameplay footage. The fourth trailer was shown in E3 2012. Destructoid and AdventureGamers.com were the first to play the game's demo. These demos where later posted in GameSpot's Daily Demo, where two gameplay missions were posted in YouTube. Wael also presented the game in Gameswelt and GotGame.com, entertaining with interviews about gameplay mechanics and the team's development timeline.

These upgrades were said to be a part of a broader move to attract more console players. This does, however, coincide with a change in Frogwares approach to difficulty. Previously, very difficult puzzles were once considered a good thing, and success was measured in how long it took people to finish the game. As of what Waël observed about, they were carefully watching the internet, counting the days until people started posting complete solutions. They admitted later on that it was a "stupid" approach, and put emphasis on accessibility and not getting stuck in the same place for too long.

Wael said that the game would show Holmes' darker side, where he now uses blackmail, forgery, and isolation in exile away from society. Saying that, Holmes now relies on his survival skills and street-smart, paired in a cat-and-mouse style plot widely seen in other games such as Tom Clancy's Splinter Cell: Conviction and Robert Ludlum's The Bourne Conspiracy.

Frogwares originally intended to release the game at the end of 2010, but was pushed back for release in 2012; the release date of the game was set for 20 September.

Atlus obtained the North American publishing rights for the game.

== Reception ==
Reception

Aggregate score
Aggregator	Score
Metacritic	PC: 73/100; PS3: 65/100; X360: 64/100

Review scores
Publication	Score
Adventure Gamers	4.5/5
Computer Games Magazine	8/10
Destructoid	7.5/10
Game Informer	7.5/10
GameRevolution	6/10
GameSpot	8/10
GamesRadar+	3.5/5

The game received mostly positive reviews. GameSpot awarded it 8 out of 10, stating "Even with the minor issues with pixel hunts and puzzle overloading, this is an uncompromising, riveting adventure game". Game Informer awarded it 7.5 out of 10 and said "True to his past exploits, Holmes' newest case provides an intriguing mystery to unravel, despite still falling for some common adventure game pitfalls".

The game was awarded "Best of the Rest" in the Honorary Aggie Award category by the website Adventure Gamers, saying that "the surprising story of Sherlock's apparent fall from grace was thoroughly engaging right from the start and kept the momentum up through well-crafted characters and plenty of twists and turns. Topped off with stunning visuals and an impressive orchestral soundtrack, this was Frogwares at their finest".
