= Sherlock Holmes: The Devil's Daughter =

2016 video game

- Developer: Frogwares
- Publishers: Frogwares; Bigben Interactive (Note: Frogwares claims Bigben was only the distributor of the game.)
- Series: Sherlock Holmes
- Engine: Unreal Engine 3
- Platforms: Microsoft Windows; PlayStation 4; Xbox One; Nintendo Switch
- Release: Windows; June 10, 2016; PlayStation 4, Xbox One; October 25, 2016; Nintendo Switch; April 7, 2022
- Genre: Adventure
- Mode: Single-player

Sherlock Holmes: The Devil's Daughter is an adventure mystery video game in the Sherlock Holmes series developed by Frogwares for Microsoft Windows, PlayStation 4 and Xbox One in 2016. It was released for the Xbox One and PlayStation 4 on 25 October, while the PC version was released earlier on June 10. A Nintendo Switch version was released on April 7, 2022.

== Gameplay ==
Like its predecessor Sherlock Holmes: Crimes & Punishments, the majority of the game involves exploring crime scenes and examining clues. Once discovered, clues are added to a "deduction board", a gameplay mechanic which involves linking pieces of information together, leading to possibilities for different deductions. Once deductions are connected together, the player will have a full tree of deductions in the player's memory called mind palace. Depending on how players interpret the clues, they will arrive at different conclusions. Thus, the player can fail or succeed in finding the culprit.

== Synopsis ==
Across five linked cases, Sherlock Holmes confronts dark family secrets, both in his cases and personally, when a visiting woman begins interfering in his personal life, especially with his adopted daughter.

=== Plot ===
Following the events of The Testament of Sherlock Holmes, after Professor James Moriarty's death, Sherlock Holmes is now taking care of Moriarty's daughter, Katelyn, while keeping her true origin as a secret. However, the situation changes when a mysterious woman known as "Alice" becomes Holmes's new neighbor. Alice slowly befriends Katelyn, eventually earning the daughter's trust while causing emotional issues between Holmes and Katelyn at the same time. Throughout the game, Holmes will solve different cases while getting to know Alice's origin and her true intention.

The game features five separate cases. Each case is self-contained and apart from in-game achievements, such as moral choices, do not relate to one another. The cases are as follows:

Prey Tell: Holmes is visited by a young boy, Tom Hurst, whose father George has gone missing. With the help of Wiggins, a local orphan, Holmes investigates and finds a string of related disappearances linked to a distinguished British benefactor, Lord Marsh. Through further inquiries, Holmes discovers Marsh and his aristocratic friends use paupers as hunting prey in Epping Forest. Hurst, who is a former British Army marksman, uncovered this after an impoverished former squadmate of his ended up becoming quarry for Marsh and his cohorts, and is now preparing to turn the tables on them during their next hunt. Holmes goes to Epping Forest and, after avoiding Marsh and his fellow hunters, he witnesses Hurst killing two of them and capturing Marsh. After speaking with Hurst, Holmes can allow him to kill Marsh gruesomely, kill Marsh himself to give him a quick death or kill Hurst in order to turn Marsh over to the police.

A Study in Green: Holmes competes in a lawn bowls tournament hosted by the chairman of the local Archaeological Society, Sir Charles Yellingham. However, the award ceremony is called off after another member of the club, Zacharias Greystoke, is found dead under mysterious circumstances, seemingly killed by a spear thrown by a statue of the Mayan king Tecún Umán. Holmes investigates and finds that Greystoke, Yellingham and the statue's maker, Bernard Marley, all took part in an expedition to Guatemala 14 years prior, alongside Albeit Dyke, another club member who they claim died of illness during the expedition. Upon investigating, Holmes discovers all three survivors believed they've been cursed by the spirit of Tecún Umán for having desecrated his temple and both Yellingham and Marley have motives to kill Greystoke. Holmes also uncovers that Albeit didn't die of illness as his companions claimed but rather was abandoned in the temple after accidentally triggering a trap. Not only that, he survived, was sold into slavery and managed to return to London after escaping alongside another escaped slave. Holmes can either accuse Albeit; claiming he wanted revenge against his former friends for abandoning him, Yellingham; claiming he wanted Greystoke dead so his private collection could be sold off to solvent the Archeological Society's near-bankrupt finances, or Marley; claiming he believed killing the other survivors would rid him of the curse.

Infamy: Holmes is followed by Orson Wilde, an American actor set to play him in a theatrical adaptation of one of his cases. The night after Wilde's arrival, a bomb is thrown into Holmes' apartment but he manages to defuse it before it goes off. Holmes looks into who may be trying to kill him and, in the process, he is recurrently forced to save Wilde after he gets himself into mortal danger while trying to aid Holmes' investigation. The detective discovers the bomb was thrown by a young man named Jeremiah Thorne, a petty crook with connections to two recently released crime bosses Holmes helped arrest years prior: Jack "The Hammer" Cole; to whom Thorne frequently sells stolen goods, and Percy "The Dart" Flemming; to whom Thorne is indebted due to gambling losses. After one final time rescuing Wilde when Thorne mistakes him for Holmes and kidnaps him; which ultimately results in Wilde killing Thorne after Holmes distracts him; Holmes has the police bring both Cole and Flemming into Scotland Yard for questioning. After interrogating both men, Holmes can accuse either one of masterminding the attempts on his life as revenge for his role in their prior arrests or he can accuse Wilde, who has a strange obsession with "becoming" Holmes and thus may have wanted to get rid of the real one.

Chain Reaction: While traveling, Holmes and Watson encounter a massive road accident that has killed and injured several people. Holmes investigates and discovers the case is more complicated than a mere accident: A gang of bankrobbers broke into a nearby bank vault via a tunnel they'd dug but, while escaping, they were electrocuted in their getaway wagon by a complex trap set up by somebody nearby, causing their wagon to stop suddenly and trigger the chain reaction that led to the massive accident. Holmes identifies three possible suspects among those in the area when the accident occurred: Thomas Garrett, an anarchist activist and amateur technician; Reginald Butcher, an electrician with a sick daughter; and Benjamin Fowler, a former member of the bankrobber gang who found religion and became a construction worker. All three suspects have varying degrees of electrical knowledge and varying degrees of proximity to the gang members. Holmes can identify any of the three suspects as the one who took part in the robbery, killed their co-conspirators and unwittingly caused the accident and either present their findings to the police or conceal them by deeming their possible motives for the crime to be justified: Garrett wanted to harm an exploitative bank and dispose of the gang for preying on the poor; Butcher wanted to get the money to fund his daughter's medical treatment; and Fowler wanted to eliminate his former gangmates because he feels guilty for having helped their past crimes.

Fever Dreams: Alice has kidnapped Holmes's adopted daughter. He must find her before it's too late. Holmes' reticence about the origins of his adopted daughter are revealed by Alice: Katelyn is the daughter of Professor James Moriarty and thus the eponymous Devil's Daughter. Holmes pieces together that Alice is insane after finding that she keeps a spare room in a her father's crypt along with her father's mummified corpse. Alice locks Holmes in Moriarty's tomb and prepares to take Kate away on a boat named Madame Destiny. Holmes escapes the tomb and finds Madame Destiny ablaze on the middle of the Thames. Holmes makes amends for his parental apathy and reunites with his ward. They escape Madame Destiny as it burns and leave Alice to her death.

== Development and release ==
An eighth installment in the series was announced in May 2015. Kerry Shale was originally expected to reprise his role as Sherlock, but was later confirmed by Frogwares that the game would focus on a different incarnation of Sherlock Holmes featuring Alex Jordan in the titular role.

In October 2016, Bandai Namco Entertainment announced that they are the publisher of the game in the Americas, except for Argentina and Brazil.

In an interview in 2020, Frogwares claimed Bigben Interactive was only a distribution intermediary.

== Reception ==
Reception

Aggregate score
Aggregator	Score
Metacritic	PC: 65/100; PS4: 71/100; XONE: 66/100

Review scores
Publication	Score
Game Informer	6.75/10
GameSpot	6/10
IGN	5/10
PC Gamer (UK)	59/100
Push Square	7/10
VideoGamer.com	7/10

GameSpot awarded Sherlock Holmes: The Devil's Daughter a score of 6.0 out of 10, criticising some major technical issues and some action elements. IGN awarded it a score of 5.0 out of 10. PC Gamer awarded it a score of 59 out of 100, criticising the game for heavily scripted set-pieces, quick time events and mini-games.

The Devil's Daughter received "mixed or average" reviews. Aggregating review website Metacritic gave the Microsoft Windows version 65/100 based on 19 reviews, the PlayStation 4 version 71/100 based on 28 reviews, and the Xbox One version 66/100 based on 12 reviews.
