= Dracula: Origin =

2008 video game

- European cover art
- Developer: Frogwares
- Publishers: FRA: Focus Home Interactive; NA: The Adventure Company; UK: 93GAMES; AU: QVS International
- Platform: Microsoft Windows
- Release: FRA: May 29, 2008; NA: June 2, 2008; UK: June 6, 2008; AU: October 6, 2008
- Genre: Adventure
- Mode: Single-player

Dracula: Origin is a point-and-click adventure game for the PC based on the novel Dracula by Bram Stoker. Released by Frogwares in 2008, it follows the company's catalogue of adventure games such as the Adventures of Sherlock Holmes series.

The game follows Professor Abraham Van Helsing as the protagonist through a unique take on the origin of Dracula. His adventures span several locations, such as London, Egypt, Austria and Transylvania, through puzzles and logic problems, individually interacting with over 40 characters.

== Plot ==
The plot follows the story of Bram Stoker's Dracula, with some variation in characters and plot detail.

At first a zealot of Christendom, Voivod Dracula forsakes his faith at the loss of his unrequited love, who opts to commit suicide rather than give in to him. As his embitterment boils, Dracula begins to delve heavily into demonic practice. Unsatisfied with mortality, he drinks the blood of a rival in a pact with the Devil, placing upon himself the curse that transforms him into the first vampire. In exchange for immortal powers, Dracula becomes a servant of the Devil, bent on the destruction of humanity, finding his only solace in feeding upon human blood and seeking revenge for his lover's death: He feels partly responsible for being unable to save her.

Upon learning of an antediluvian manuscript detailing a strange rite alleged to return souls from the dead, Dracula seeks to revive his former lover's soul. Johnathan Harker, a disciple of Van Helsing, sets out to combat the terror of Dracula's power. He sends a letter to his professor detailing Dracula's intention regarding the manuscript and his plan to resurrect his lover's soul into the body of Johnathan's fiancée, Mina Murray, chosen for her remarkable resemblance to his lover. Johnathan's letter arrives but Johnathan does not return, implying that he succumbed to Dracula's power.

Professor Abraham Van Helsing, the protagonist, embarks to defeat Dracula before he finds the manuscript and abducts the body of Mina, traveling throughout Europe to do so. He begins with a London cemetery he believes Dracula to be occupying. His adventures take him to the streets and tombs of Cairo, the salons of Vienna's aristocracy and a Rococo library that leads him on the trail to a secretive damned monastery to stop the evil plots being concocted there. The vampire hunter then finds his way to Transylvania, to the famous castle of Dracula, to complete his task.

== Gameplay ==
The game is played in third-person, following Van Helsing, in a point-and-click style. Using collected objects and puzzles, the player advances through the story interacting with characters to go through the adventure.

The game has a progressive help system, providing players stuck on puzzles with increasingly detailed clues to help them advance.

=== Characters ===
Count Dracula: The main antagonist of the game is a young looking, attractive, religious vampire, rendered immortal by a pact with demonic forces. Suffering the abandonment of his suicidal former love, Dracula has become godless and heartless, powerful but pitiful. He seeks retribution for his pain against the human race.

Professor Abraham Van Helsing: A famous Dutch teacher at the University of Medicine in London. Known more for his involvement in supernatural study and vampire hunting, he bravely takes it upon himself to end the terror of Dracula.

Mina Murray: Jonathan Harker's fiancée and a student and friend of Professor Van Helsing. Pure and good, she embodies the essence of Dracula's lost love, succumbing to his power and doomed to be stripped of her soul for her bodily vessel.

Dr. Seward: A young doctor and another contact and friend of Van Helsing. He aids Mina at her sickbed, striving to free her from the demonic grip of Dracula that has weakened her so.

Herodotus of Judah: A Coptic priest and healer in Cairo, Egypt. Possesses the knowledge but, due to his old age, not the ability required to release the curse Dracula has put upon Mina.

Jada: A beautiful, deadly disciple of Dracula, devoted to serve and protect her master.

Igor: Dracula's coachman in Transylvania. Of demonic will and ill intent, he is another devotee of Dracula, sharing his contempt for humans and carrying out Dracula's menial, dirty bidding.

== Reception ==
Reception

Aggregate score
Aggregator	Score
Metacritic	70/100

Review scores
Publication	Score
Adventure Gamers	3.5/5
Eurogamer	7/10
GameRevolution	D+
GameSpot	7/10
Gamezebo	3.5/5
GameZone	7.5/10
IGN	8/10
PC Format	77%
PC Gamer (US)	57%
PC PowerPlay	7/10

Dracula: Origin received "mixed or average reviews" according to the review aggregation website Metacritic. PC Format complimented the game's atmosphere and mood. GameRevolution was more negative to the game.

== Sequel ==
Frogwares developed a sequel, Dracula: Love Kills, Hidden Object Puzzle Adventure, released in June 2011.

The plot of the game sends players to the Queen of Vampires who emerges from the ashes of history, seeking to destroy the world of humans and rule over its ruins. Count Dracula (as the protagonist this time) awakens, weakened and stripped of his powers after years of healing from his last battle with Dr. Van Helsing. He cannot face his evil rival, the Queen, on his own. To save the world, an uneasy alliance must be formed between the Prince of Darkness and his archenemy, Van Helsing.

Gameplay is designed for 6 hours + bonus content. The game features over 40 locations, easy and hard modes, challenging puzzles, optional tutorial, interactive map, achievements, etc. During the game, the player encounters assassins of the Queen of Vampires getting the choice of either biting them and turning them into vampires or sparing them. These certain actions will have consequences as who will accompany Dracula during the bonus gameplay; it also influences the overall ending depending on Dracula's previous behavior.
