= Journey to the Center of the Earth (disambiguation) =

Journey to the Center of the Earth (French title Voyage au centre de la Terre) is an 1864 science fiction novel by Jules Verne.

Journey to the Center of the Earth may also refer to:

== Film and television ==
- Journey to the Center of the Earth (1959 film), a film starring James Mason, Pat Boone, and Arlene Dahl
- Journey to the Center of the Earth (TV series), a 1967 animated ABC series based on the 1959 film
- A Journey to the Center of the Earth (1977 film), a 1977 Australian animated TV film
- Journey to the Center of the Earth (1989 film), a sequel to the movie Alien from L.A.
- Journey to the Center of the Earth (1993 film), a TV film featuring Carel Struycken, Tim Russ, and Jeffrey Nordling
- Journey to the Center of the Earth (miniseries), a 1999 miniseries starring Treat Williams and Bryan Brown
- Journey to the Center of the Earth (2008 TV film), a 2008 TV film featuring Rick Schroder
- Journey to the Center of the Earth (2008 direct-to-video film), a 2008 direct-to-video film produced by The Asylum
- Journey to the Center of the Earth (2008 theatrical film), a 2008 theatrical film adaptation of the novel starring Brendan Fraser, Josh Hutcherson, and Anita Briem
- "Journey to the Centre of the Earth" (Ben & Holly's Little Kingdom), a 2012 episode of Ben & Holly's Little Kingdom

== Video games ==
- A Journey to the Centre of the Earth (1984 video game), a side-scrolling action-adventure platform game
- Journey to the Center of the Earth (2003 video game), a 2003 video game
- Journey to the Center of the Earth (2008 video game), a video game adaptation of the 2008 theatrical film for the Nintendo DS

== Other uses ==
- Journey to the Centre of the Earth (album), a 1974 progressive rock concept album by Rick Wakeman
- Journey to the Center of the Earth (attraction), an attraction at Tokyo DisneySea that plays into the Jules Verne story
- Voyage to the Centre of the Earth (French: Voyage au centre de la Terre), a 1821 novel by Jacques Collin de Plancy

== See also ==
- The Fabulous Journey to the Centre of the Earth, a 1977 Spanish film starring Kenneth More also known as Viaje al centro de la Tierra and Where Time Began
- Travel to the Earth's center, the science fiction theme
