= 80 Days (2005 video game) =

- Developer: Frogwares
- Publishers: EU: Focus Home Interactive; NA: Tri Synergy
- Producers: Waël Amr; Pascal Ensenat
- Designer: Aurélie Ludot
- Programmer: Anton Schekhovtsov
- Artist: Ludmila Kotsurba
- Writers: Pascal Ensenat; Aurélie Ludot; Waël Amr
- Platform: Microsoft Windows
- Release: EU: 4 November 2005; NA: 12 December 2005
- Genre: Adventure
- Mode: Single-player

80 Days (Russian: Вокруг света за 80 дней) is an adventure video game developed by Frogwares and released in 2005 for Windows. It is based on the 1873 Jules Verne novel Around the World in Eighty Days.

== Gameplay ==
The game is a typical adventure game. The player must collect objects and go to particular locations to reach the next objective. However, there are three limitations: time, money and fatigue. The latter may be ignored using means of transport and can be restored by eating food.

== Plot ==
Matthew Lavisheart is an engineer. He makes a bet, showing that he took part at inventing the most important gadgets at the time by delivering the documents that approve this in maximum 80 days. The problem is that these documents are scattered, in four of the most important cities of the world: Cairo, Bombay, Yokohama and San Francisco.

Matthew begs his nephew, Oliver, to get these documents for him. Oliver accepts, as he wants to escape a marriage that his parents want. And so, Oliver leaves for Cairo.

== Reception ==
Reception

Aggregate score
Aggregator	Score
Metacritic	58/100

Review scores
Publication	Score
Adventure Gamers	3.5/5
Computer Gaming World	2.5/5
GameSpot	5.1/10
GameZone	7.5/10
IGN	7/10
PALGN	4.5/10
PC Gamer (US)	61%
The New York Times	(mixed)

80 Days received "mixed" reviews according to the review aggregation website Metacritic. PC Gamer US gave it 61% nearly a year after the game was released in the United States.
