= The Sinking City 2 =

2026 video game

- Developer: Frogwares
- Publisher: Frogwares
- Composers: Viacheslav Pakalin; Roman Savytskyi
- Engine: Unreal Engine 5
- Platforms: PlayStation 5; Windows; Xbox Series X/S; Nintendo Switch 2
- Release: PlayStation 5, Windows, Xbox Series X/S; 18 August 2026; Nintendo Switch 2; 2027
- Genre: Survival horror
- Mode: Single-player

The Sinking City 2 is a survival horror game developed by Frogwares and inspired by the works of horror fiction author H. P. Lovecraft. The game is a sequel to The Sinking City (2019) and the story is set in the city of Arkham during the 1920s.

The Sinking City 2 was released for PlayStation 5, Windows, and Xbox Series X/S on 18 August 2026 to generally favorable reviews. A Nintendo Switch 2 version is scheduled to be released in 2027.

== Gameplay ==
The Sinking City 2 is a semi-open world survival horror game with a focus on combat and exploration while also overcoming a changing landscape due to the increasing flood waters that alter locations as the game progresses. The game features an inventory system and allows the player to collect resources as well as being able to use firearms and melee weapons against enemies. The game also features an optional investigation system that gives benefits to players and allows them to solve puzzles that unlock alternate options and reveal lore and/or secrets.

== Synopsis ==
=== Setting ===
The Sinking City 2 takes place in the city of Arkham, Massachusetts in the late 1920s that has been impacted by a supernatural flood. The game has a completely standalone story from its predecessor The Sinking City.

=== Plot ===
In the summer of 1929, during a series of floods in Arkham, Massachusetts, Calvin Rafferty, an adventurer, and his partner, university professor Faye Bennett, perform the Ritual of Dreaming to gain access to the Dreamlands they read about in ancient tomes from Miskatonic University. However, something goes wrong during the ritual and while Calvin regains consciousness, Faye remains in a supernatural coma. Over the next three months, the floods consume Arkham and the city is beset by a plague of the Slither – parasitic worms that kill people and then puppeteer their corpses. Calvin researches how to awaken Faye and learns of a ritual named "The Call" in a book known as the "Recitations of the Tenebrous Soul" which requires the dagger of Ult'hkandor, also known as the blade of Ulthar. By September 21st, the final day of evacuation, Calvin has procured the dagger and discovered that a copy of the book is kept in the secret section of the university library.

Calvin makes his way to the library and recovers the book, but cannot read its alien languages. While exploring the library, he comes upon a translator called Corentin, who has removed his eyes and sown Slither worms into his empty orbital sockets to be able to understand the creatures and their language. Corentin offers to translate the instructions for the ritual from the book if Calvin goes to the Devil's Reef Hotel and brings him a woman called Lorelei who is trapped there. At the Hotel, Calvin finds Lorelei is a siren and that the previous evening the hotel's guests engaged in a "World's End Party", where all guests would fight to the death for the prize of being able to spend one night of lust with Lorelei before being consumed by her. However, none of the guests survived the battle and Lorelei was left strung up above the hotel lounge's main stage, unable to get down. Calvin navigates the hotel, killing the Slither-reanimated corpses of the previous night's "Party", until he can get to the lounge and cut Lorelei down. He takes her back to Corentin, who gives him his translation and, as Calvin leaves, reveals that he wants Lorelei because the Slithers in his eyes wish to devour her flesh.

Returning to his apartment, Calvin performs the ritual to awaken Faye, but is interrupted by a giant Slither who steals her body and knocks him out. When he awakens, Calvin finds that Faye has returned as an incorporeal spirit. Together, they set out to recover her stolen body, whose position Faye can sense. The trail leads them to Akeley Hospital, where the creature that stole Faye's body has placed it in a machine known as the Eye, which head surgeon Dr. Thaddeus Lowe had been using to cure ailments in a seemingly supernatural fashion. Calvin and Faye have multiple encounters with Lowe throughout their attempts to deactivate the Eye, which culminate with the revelation that "Dr. Lowe" is actually a creature known as Mi-Go, which had been wearing the doctor's skin. The Mi-Go attacks Calvin, only to suddenly stop upon reading his and Faye's minds and learning that she is a "Dreamer" and they serve "its" purposes. Calvin shuts down the machine, but is interrupted by the giant Slither once more, which steals Faye's body before fleeing.

The pair follow it to the Arkham Fish Market, which had been abandoned during the early flood due to rumors of "monsters" attacking the place. The monsters turn out to be Deep Ones, which have emerged from the sea and are working for the giant Slither, known as the Slither Prime, which spawned the smaller parasitic worms that plague the city. In the bowels of a ship that had crashed into the fish market during the early flood, Calvin fights a Shoggoth controlled by the Slither Prime and manages to access a portal which takes him and Faye to the Antarctic. There, they encounter the long dead remains of an expedition that uncovered alien-looking ruins buried in the ice: A temple to the Outer God Yog-Sothoth, the opening of which unleashed the Slither Prime and caused the flood to pour into Arkham through the portal underneath the fish market.

In the depths of the temple, Calvin faces off against the Slither Prime and finally kills it. Upon performing the ritual to awaken Faye's body, they both regain their memories of the day of the failed Ritual of Dreaming: The pair had entered the Dreamland and encountered the Slither Prime, which killed Calvin. Faye offered her life to Yog-Sothoth in exchange for Calvin being resurrected, which prompted the deity to place both their spirits in his body in order to sustain his dying form, after which Calvin awoke back in Arkham. Since then, through his servants, the Slither Prime and Mi-Go, Yog-Sothoth has been trying to lure Calvin and Faye to his temple so Faye, as a Dreamer, can complete a ritual to unleash Yog-Sothoth upon Arkham and consume the souls of all who remain there. Desperate to be together again, Calvin and Faye accept the God's bargain and open the portal to allow his return. Faye's physical body is restored and the lovers embrace for a moment before Yog-Sothoth descends upon Arkham and swallows the city.

=== The Holloway Manor ===
Some time during the three month period of Arkham’s flooding, Calvin is summoned by the wealthy Ezra Holloway to his family manor. Upon arriving, the elderly Ezra asks Calvin to recover his family heirlooms, which have been supernaturally misplaced. While exploring the Slither-infested manor and recovering the missing heirlooms, Calvin pieces together the Holloway family history, discovering that the family progenitor Alistair had made a pact with a deity known as Mother Ulmata, with each successive son continuing the bloodline and the mothers of their sons being prematurely killed by Ulmata in return for her blessing. Ezra had mistakenly undone the pact when he bludgeoned his newborn son to death in blind rage after his wife died in childbirth, but realized he could produce a substitute son through bonds of fraternity.

Calvin confronts Ezra, who admits he tricked Calvin into becoming his surrogate son so he could renew his family’s pact with Ulmata. Not wanting to remain trapped in the Holloway Manor and inherit their curse, Calvin chases a newly-empowered Ezra into a subterranean shrine where Ulmata summons Ezra’s ancestors as shadowy monsters. Defeating the shadows, Calvin’s successful renouncement of the Holloway legacy causes Ulmata to abandon Ezra, who falls from the top of the shrine to his death as Calvin leaves the manor behind.

== Release ==
The game was announced at the Xbox Partner Preview showcase by Microsoft Gaming in March 2024. A Kickstarter campaign launched on March 6, 2025 to help fund the game and additional features to it. CEO Wael Amr explained: "From power cuts as our electrical infrastructure was targeted for months to the need for team members to relocate at very short notice, this financial safety net proved invaluable to us. So, we need to do the same now with The Sinking City 2 as this game is vastly bigger and more complex."

In February 2025 the studio announced the registration for the beta testing period, with The Sinking City 2 being officially released for PlayStation 5, Windows, and Xbox Series X/S on August 18, 2026. A version for Nintendo Switch 2 is scheduled to be released in 2027.

== Reception ==
Reception

Aggregate scores
Aggregator	Score
Metacritic	(PC) 76/100 (PS5) 78/100 (XSXS) 75/100
OpenCritic	75% recommend (Note: Based on 107 reviews)

Review scores
Publication	Score
GamesRadar+	4/5
Hardcore Gamer	4/5
IGN	8/10
PC Gamer (US)	70/100
Push Square	7/10
Shacknews	7/10
The Guardian	3/5

The Sinking City 2 received "generally favorable" reviews, according to review aggregator website Metacritic. Fellow review aggregator OpenCritic assessed that the game received strong approval, being recommended by 75% of critics.

GamesRadar+ reviewer Oscar Taylor-Kent stated: "The Sinking City 2 is a confident adventure that can go tentacle to tentacle with modern survival horror like Resident Evil and Silent Hill. The odd misstep is forgiven when Lovecraftian twists work so well to deliver some unsettling, unexpected moments of terror that just feel oh so joyous to squeal at."

Len Hafer of IGN summarized: "While a lot of the basic mechanics and moment-to-moment survival horror of The Sinking City 2 feel inescapably like off-brand Resident Evil, it's a praiseworthy imitation of its main inspirations wrapped in the Cthulhu mythos."
