= Sherlock Holmes and the Mystery of Osborne House =

2010 video game

- PAL cover art
- Developer: Frogwares
- Publisher: Frogwares; Focus Home Interactive: NA: THQ
- Series: Sherlock Holmes
- Platform: Nintendo DS
- Release: EU: 24 June 2010; NA: 4 January 2011
- Genre: Adventure
- Mode: Single-player

Sherlock Holmes and the Mystery of Osborne House is a 2010 adventure video game developed by Frogwares and released for the Nintendo DS handheld game console. It is the first in the Sherlock Holmes series to be made specifically for the DS.

== Gameplay ==
Sherlock Holmes and the Mystery of Osborne House places a heavy emphasis on puzzles, which the player solves using the stylus and touch screen. These largely take the form of minigames which include jigsaw puzzles, codes to decipher and paintings to examine. Each of these puzzles has its own difficulty settings and styles of gameplay. The game also features a help system which highlights important clues and guides the player in completing the puzzles. Solving the puzzle without the use of the help system awards the player with extra points and unlocks extras material and bonus puzzles.

The game takes place in large hand drawn environments from the Victorian era London which players can roam and explore, taking on side quests and optional missions. When they interact with the various characters in the game, players can request information and interrogate them. When these characters give the player a clue, Holmes will sketch it, forming a new puzzle.

== Plot ==
When Queen Victoria's genealogical records are stolen, the royal family decides to put Sherlock Holmes in charge of the case and asks him to solve the strange mystery. Followed by Doctor Watson, Holmes use his senses of logic and observation through dozens of riddles, puzzles and brain teasers of all sorts. The investigation takes him to Windsor Castle, Buckingham Palace and the British Museum, and along the way he meets many charismatic characters who helps him solve the strange case and finally discover the truth, including the question of why the royal family insists on keeping the case a secret.

== Reception ==
Reception

Aggregate scores
Aggregator	Score
GameRankings	60.60%
Metacritic	48/100

Review scores
Publication	Score
Adventure Gamers	2.5/5
IGN	4.5/10

Sherlock Holmes and the Mystery of Osborne House received mixed to negative reviews from critics and user reviews. IGN gave it a poor score of 4.5. Adventure Gamers rated the game 2.5 stars out 5, heavily criticizing the short length of gameplay with uninspiring puzzles, an uninteresting plot, repetitive music and lack of hints. They did praise the quality of the graphics and the quizzes included.
