= Sherlock Holmes: The Mystery of the Mummy =

2002 video game

- European cover art
- Developer: Frogwares
- Publishers: Wanadoo; The Adventure Company; Frogwares
- Series: Sherlock Holmes
- Platforms: Microsoft Windows, Nintendo DS
- Release: Windows: EU: 29 December 2002; NA: 22 January 2003; Nintendo DS: AU: 15 May 2009; EU: 22 May 2009; NA: 13 July 2009
- Genre: Adventure

Sherlock Holmes: The Mystery of the Mummy is an adventure game for Microsoft Windows, developed by Frogwares and released in 2002. The player controls Arthur Conan Doyle's fictional detective, Sherlock Holmes, as he investigates the mysteriously abandoned mansion of British archeologist Lord Montcalfe. It is the first in the Sherlock Holmes series of adventure games developed by Frogwares and Viva Media, and was ported to the Nintendo DS in 2009.

According to Frogwares, Mystery of the Mummy was a surprise hit for the team and sold roughly 1 million units by 2013.

== Gameplay ==
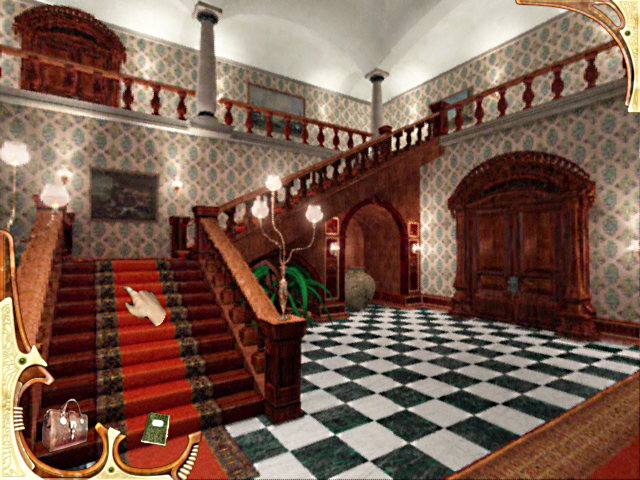
Gameplay screenshot

The original version of the game is played from a first person perspective. The locations are rendered in three dimensions using pre-rendered backgrounds and feature limited movement; the player uses the mouse to move between a series of set positions in the environment. The player collects a series of items as they move through the gameworld, and a notepad records notes and papers which have been found. These items are pieces of information are used to solve a series of puzzles.

The Nintendo DS port of Sherlock Holmes: The Mystery of the Mummy is again played from a first-person perspective, using pre-rendered backgrounds to present a three-dimensional environment. The player uses the stylus both for interacting with objects in the environment and for movement. The two screens are used to display the environment and Holmes's inventory; the player can switch these depending on which they wish to interact with. The majority of the puzzles are based around opening locked doors, which require the collection of items which must be placed in sequence in order to proceed.

A Wii version of the game was originally planned, which would have retained many of the gameplay features of the previous Nintendo DS version, and incorporated the use of Wii Remote and the Nunchuk. The Wii version of the game was canceled and was never released in any region.

== Reception ==
Reception

Aggregate scores
Aggregator	Score
GameRankings	(PC) 63.17% (DS) 51.80%
Metacritic	(PC) 61/100 (DS) 57/100

Review scores
Publication	Score
Adventure Gamers	2.5/5
GameSpot	5.4/10
GameZone	6/10
IGN	6.5/10
PC Gamer (US)	55%
The Electric Playground	6/10

The game received mixed reviews. On GameRankings and Metacritic, it has ratings of 63.17% and 61 out of 100 for the PC version, and 51.80% and 57 out of 100 for the DS version respectively.

=== Sales ===
According to Olga Ryzhko of Frogwares, Mystery of the Mummy was a surprise hit for the company. In North America, it achieved sales of 44,179 retail units during the year 2003, with another 5,076 during the first two months of 2004. Frogwares president Waël Amr said in August 2004 that the game had performed "extremely well" overall. By late 2006, the game and its sequel, Secret of the Silver Earring, had reached combined sales above 500,000 copies in Europe. The first four Sherlock Holmes titles from Frogwares—Mummy, Silver Earring, The Awakened and Nemesis—totaled roughly 1.5 million global sales by February 2009.

In 2013, Ryzhko reported that Mystery of the Mummy's PC version alone had sold "around a million units worldwide".

== See also ==
- The Lost Files of Sherlock Holmes: The Case of the Rose Tattoo
- The Mystery of the Druids
