= Frogwares =

Ukrainian video game developer

- Type: Private
- Industry: Video games
- Founded: 2000
- Headquarters: Kyiv, Ukraine; Dublin, Ireland
- Key people: Waël Amr (CEO, president)
- Products: Sherlock Holmes series
- Number of employees: 80+
- Website: frogwares.com

Frogwares is a Ukrainian video game development studio headquartered in Kyiv with subsidiary offices in Dublin, Ireland. The studio and its subsidiaries develop adventure games for PlayStation 4, Xbox One, Microsoft Windows, Nintendo Switch as well as PlayStation 3, Xbox 360, Nintendo DS, Nintendo 3DS, Wii, and mobile.

Frogwares created the Adventures of Sherlock Holmes series, which has sold around seven million copies worldwide. The studio released its first open world game, The Sinking City, inspired by the works of H. P. Lovecraft, in 2019.

== History ==
Frogwares was founded in 2000 in Ukraine and Ireland by French expatriates. Waël Amr is the CEO. The name "Frogwares" comes from the derogatory term "froggies" to designate people of French origin.

When it was created, the studio was made up of a team of six people which then expanded to reach eighty employees in 2018. The studio specialized in the Sherlock Holmes adventure games series.

With Sherlock Holmes: The Mystery of the Persian Carpet (2008), Frogwares began to develop casual games. In 2011, the studio created a dedicated subsidiary, Waterlily Games. During this time, the company's publisher shut down and Frogwares began self publishing. The casual games produced by the studio are often distributed exclusively for download, with the exception of the Sherlock Holmes casual games, which are also published on physical media.

In 2012, Frogwares released World of Battles: Morningstar, its first multiplayer MMORTS, following a beta release. World of Battles was a strategy game set in a fantastic medieval universe where the player trains and controls an army and must succeed in defeating other armies controlled by other players to recover gems. It shut down the following year.

In 2012, Frogwares opened a second subsidiary, 3AM Studios, to release Magrunner: Dark Pulse, a strategic sci-fi shooter based on the magnetization of cubes and platforms to move through each level. The studio use Kickstarter alternative Gamesplanet Labs to help fund the project. Upon the game's release in 2013, Magrunner was compared to Portal.

In 2014, Focus Home Interactive announced a Call of Cthulhu game developed with Frogwares. However, by 2017, it had a new developer. Instead, Frogwares developed The Sinking City, an open world game based on the writing of H.P. Lovecraft. It was released in 2019.

In May 2020, Frogwares officially announced Sherlock Holmes: Chapter One, a prequel exploring the early years of the character. Unlike previous entries in the series, this one would take place in an open world environment, allowing players to freely explore the island of Cordona. After the game officially released, the PlayStation 4 and Xbox One versions were delayed into 2022. New DLC was released in March. The PS4 version was released in April, but the Xbox One version was ultimately cancelled.

=== Russian invasion of Ukraine ===
On 24 February 2022, Frogwares posted on social media about the Russian invasion of Ukraine and how it has affected the development team. They published a series of similar messages and documented the experience of living through the war. Many on staff either joined humanitarian aid efforts or the volunteer army. Those who remained with the studio adopted a hybrid model. Frogwares removed its games for sale in Russia and called on other companies to do the same. In May, the company received an Epic MegaGrant and used the funds to relocate its staff.

In July 2022, the company announced it was developing a remake of its 2007 Sherlock Holmes: The Awakened. The game would be developed from scratch in Unreal Engine 4 and rewritten to serve as a sequel to Sherlock Holmes: Chapter One. Initially envisioned as a side project, it became the studio's sole focus due to the limiting factors of the war. In August, Frogwares released a trailer and launched a Kickstarter to help create a safety net for development. The game's funding goal was surpassed within hours. Due to the ongoing conflict in the area, the release date was pushed back to April 2023. The game did not offer Russian language support.

=== The Sinking City 2 ===
In March 2024, Frogwares announced The Sinking City 2, a sequel set in 1920s New England. The game features a new protagonist and focuses more on combat than the original.

== Games developed ==
Year	Title	Publisher/ Distributor	Genre	PC	7th Gen	8th Gen	9th Gen	Other
2002	Sherlock Holmes: The Mystery of the Mummy	Frogwares, Wanadoo, The Adventure Company	Adventure	Windows	—N/a	—N/a	—N/a	DS
2003	Journey to the Center of the Earth	Frogwares, Micro Application	Adventure, point and click	Windows	—N/a	—N/a	—N/a	—N/a
2004	Sherlock Holmes: The Case of the Silver Earring	Frogwares, Ubisoft, Digital Jesters	Adventure	Windows	Wii	—N/a	—N/a	—N/a
2005	80 Days	Focus Entertainment, Tri Synergy	Adventure	Windows	—N/a	—N/a	—N/a	—N/a
2006	Sherlock Holmes: The Awakened	Frogwares, Focus Entertainment	Adventure	Windows	—N/a	—N/a	—N/a	—N/a
2007	Sherlock Holmes vs. Arsène Lupin	Frogwares, Focus Entertainment	Adventure	Windows	—N/a	—N/a	—N/a	—N/a
2008	Dracula: Origin	Focus Entertainment, The Adventure Company, 93GAMES, QVS International	Adventure, point and click	Windows	—N/a	—N/a	—N/a	—N/a
2009	Sherlock Holmes vs. Jack the Ripper	Frogwares, Focus Entertainment	Adventure	Windows	X360	—N/a	—N/a	—N/a
2011	World of Battles: Morningstar	Frogwares	MMORTS	Windows	—N/a	—N/a	—N/a	—N/a
2012	The Testament of Sherlock Holmes	Frogwares, Focus Entertainment	Action adventure	Windows	PS3, X360	PS4, XOne	—N/a	Switch
2013	Magrunner: Dark Pulse	Frogwares	Action adventure, puzzle	Windows	PS3, X360	—N/a	—N/a	—N/a
2014	Sherlock Holmes: Crimes & Punishments	Focus Entertainment	Action adventure	Windows	PS3, X360	PS4, XOne	—N/a	Switch
2016	Sherlock Holmes: The Devil's Daughter	Frogwares, Bigben Interactive	Action adventure	Windows	—N/a	PS4, XOne	—N/a	Switch
2019	The Sinking City	Frogwares, Bigben Interactive	Action adventure, open-world	Windows	—N/a	PS4, XOne	PS5, Xbox Series X/S	Switch
2021	Sherlock Holmes Chapter One	Frogwares	Action adventure, open-world	Windows	—N/a	PS4	PS5, Xbox Series X/S	—N/a
2023	Sherlock Holmes: The Awakened	Frogwares	Action adventure	Windows	—N/a	PS4, XOne	PS5, Xbox Series X/S	Switch
2025	The Sinking City: Remastered	Frogwares	Action adventure, open-world	Windows	—N/a	—N/a	PS5, Xbox Series X/S	—N/a
2026	The Sinking City 2	Frogwares	Survival horror	Windows	—N/a	—N/a	PS5, Xbox Series X/S	Switch 2

=== Casual adventure games ===
Casual games are developed under the name Waterlily Games. This sub-studio is focused on casual, hidden object, and light adventure games for PC and iOS.

- The Adventures of Sherlock Holmes: The Mystery of the Persian Carpet (2008)
- Mata Hari and the Kaiser's Submarines (2008)
- Department 42: The Mystery of the Nine (2009)
- Sherlock Holmes and the Mystery of Osborne House (2011)
- Secret Mission: The Forgotten Island (2011)
- Sherlock Holmes and the Hound of the Baskervilles (2011)
- Dracula: Love Kills (2011)
- Journey: The Heart of Gaia (2012)
- Sherlock Holmes and the Mystery of the Frozen City (2013) for Nintendo 3DS

== Litigations ==
The studio has encountered several disputes with its business partners. The company released its first game, Sherlock Holmes: The Mystery of the Mummy, in 2002. Frogwares filed several lawsuits against its distribution intermediaries, claiming the companies did not pay it fairly.

The studio then chose Focus Home Interactive as a licensee from 2004–2005 to 2014–2015. In 2019, Frogwares claimed Focus Home Interactive was not the publisher of the games, but a distribution intermediary that did not participate in the financing of games.

The relationship between the two companies ended in a dispute in the fall of 2019 when Focus Home Interactive's license ended. The situation resulted in the temporary withdrawal of most Frogwares games from sale. Frogware, who remains the sole owner of the rights, had to initiate new certifications and online publishing processes for each individual game to make them available for purchase again. The titles reappeared gradually in 2020.

In August 2020, Frogwares publicly accused Bigben Interactive (now Nacon) of trying to claim the copyright for The Sinking City, missing milestone payments, and withholding royalty payments. As a result, Frogwares terminated its contract with Bigben Interactive and removed the game from most online platforms. A DRM-free version of the game remained available on the developer's website. It also could still be found on EA Origin, Nintendo Switch, and Gamesplanet, since Frogwares handled publishing for those platforms on its own.

In January 2021, the game was restored to stores by court order as the contract was terminated in a 'manifestly unlawful' manner. Frogwares urged users not to purchase certain versions of The Sinking City, such as the one on Steam, accusing Nacon of hacking the game and publishing an altered version. Frogwares was able to get this version of the game taken off the platform after issuing a DMCA takedown notice. During this period, the developer released an enhanced version of the game for PlayStation 5, but were unable to give owners of the PS4 version of the game a free upgrade.

On 2 January 2024, Frogwares announced that it became the sole publisher of the game for all platforms, resolving its legal dispute with Nacon.

== See also ==
- Legend Entertainment
- Pendulo Studios
- Revolution Software
