= Magrunner: Dark Pulse =

2013 video game

- Developer: Frogwares
- Engine: Unreal Engine 3
- Platforms: Microsoft Windows, PlayStation 3, Xbox 360
- Release: Microsoft Windows; 20 June 2013; PlayStation Network; 22 October 2013; Xbox Live Arcade; 25 October 2013
- Genre: Puzzle
- Mode: Single-player

Magrunner: Dark Pulse is a puzzle game developed by Frogwares. It was released as a downloadable title on Microsoft Windows on 20 June 2013, PlayStation Network on 23 October 2013, and Xbox Live Arcade on 25 October 2013. Magrunner: Dark Pulse is set in a cyberpunk reimagining of H. P. Lovecraft's Cthulhu Mythos.

== Storyline ==
The story begins as Xander, the CEO of Gruckezber Corporation, who is interviewed on 3D television as he announces the start of the contest using the corporation's magnetic technology, and that several contestants, known as "magrunners" will compete for the prize.

The player takes on the role of Dax, one of seven "magrunners" competing for the prize of being selected for a trip to outer space. Dax has to perform various puzzles in several large rooms, using the magnetic attraction and repulsion properties of some of the objects and equipment to be able to exit each room and go on to the next one. Dax is the only player without a corporate sponsor, and whose only assistance comes from Gamaji, a six-armed mutant who can communicate in 3D holography through a clandestine channel Gruckezber Corporation does not know about which can be activated when Dax is between puzzle rooms.

Dax faces the first of the nightmarish monstrosities of the mythos that now infest the realm. Gamaji reveals Xander's insane past to Dax as Kram goes mad with his exposure to the eldritch environment. Dax discovers the Soul Pillars feeding its power to the ritual gate that Xander has devised to free his master, Cthulhu. When Dax confronts Xander, he faces a greater threat — one of the Spawn of Cthulhu emerging through The Gate to herald the arrival of the Great Old One.

The eventual change from a clean, high-tech environment to a dirty, old-looking technology system, and later into interplanetary regions, is similar to the change from high-tech, "sterile" testing rooms into the "internal" systems and equipment in the game Portal.

== Gameplay ==
Players use the Magtech glove to solve puzzles.

Magrunner: Dark Pulse is a first-person action puzzle game. Using Magtech glove, the player can power any other Magtech objects with different, colored charges: either green/blue or red. Objects charged with the same color will attract each other, while objects charged with different colors will repel each other. The developer has intentionally changed the real physics approach of conventional bipolarity of Magnets when the similar colors repel each other to expand game mechanics. Interacting with three or more objects simultaneously proves the necessity of this change.

The player navigates through training modules, solving dynamic puzzles, interacting with platforms, cubes, catapults, cube transformers, and other elements. As the game progresses, its mechanics evolve in different directions, allowing for varied gameplay as puzzles become more and more complex and elaborate. Eventually, the protagonist is joined by a robotic dog, Newton, to be used when the player needs a movable, chargeable object. If powered with one of the color charges, it will influence the other charged objects.

Magrunner: Dark Pulse is based on 8 main gameplay elements. Each act has a unique setting. The settings slowly change as the game progresses, integrating new elements into the story and gameplay. Each gameplay element is introduced through 1-2 easy levels. The new elements continue appearing in later levels after the tutorials (with decreased levels of difficulty) introducing the specific mechanics. Difficulty of puzzles in the game grows slowly during all 40 levels. However when the new gameplay element is introduced the difficulty of a certain level drops to make sure the player learns new mechanics and solves the puzzle at the same time.

In the first setting the player is introduced to the Cube, Platform and Transformer gameplay elements. As worlds of man and the mythos move closer in the second setting of the game, the player confronts bots and other monsters. Levels reach their maximum difficulty in the second setting. The third setting of the game doesn't add any new mechanics; it rather combines existing mechanics, with 3-8 gameplay elements on each level.

== Development and release ==
The first working on the game was started in 2011 by the members of Frogwares studio. After a year of development, the story was written, 25 levels built with Unreal Engine were completed, and design specifications for all 40 levels were ready. On 2 July 2012, 3 AM Games started a crowdfunding campaign in collaboration with GamesPlanet, a digital European gaming platform and Ulule, a European crowdfunding site, aiming to gather €100,000 to finish the game and to add Player vs Player mode and five additional maps for the PVP gameplay. The game was successfully funded on 17 August 2012 but the PvP idea was abandoned. Developer also considered a Mac release, iPad and Apple TV compatibility for a specific gaming experience, professional soundtrack made by a famous composer, high-quality voicing, additional levels and a level editor for the players.

Originally the game was named NYC (N = Newton, Y = Yoshi (the protagonist) and C = Cthulhu); it then transformed into Magrunner: Dark Pulse. During development the game survived several significant changes including the story, main characters, features, etc.

An early access version was launched on Steam on 19 June 2013, restricted for game supporters who crowdfunded the game. The demo was ranked 4.32 out of 5 by the backers. Magrunner: Dark Pulse was released on the major downloadable platforms on 20 June 2013. After the PC version's release, the work continued to launch the game on PlayStation Network and Xbox Live Arcade.

The game was distributed by Focus Home Interactive, which claimed to be the publisher but was only a distribution intermediary. The exact role of Focus Home Interactive was explained by Frogwares CEO in an interview given to the French media Planète Aventure in February 2020, in which he explained that Frogwares had never worked with publishing companies. Focus Home Interactive was only a licensee which did not possess intellectual properties on the games.

== Reception ==
Reception

Aggregate score
Aggregator	Score
Metacritic	PC: 70/100; PS3: 72/100; X360: 74/100

Review scores
Publication	Score
Destructoid	6.5/10
GameSpot	7.5/10
IGN	6.8/10

Magrunner: Dark Pulse received mixed reviews on Metacritic. GameSpot said the game had great horror ambiance and fun challenges, but they called the story too serious for its own good. IGN said that the game was challenging but had a boring storyline and under-baked horror. Destructoid called the game gorgeous but frustrating at times.
