= Sherlock Holmes: The Awakened (2023 video game) =

2023 video game

- Developer: Frogwares
- Publisher: Frogwares
- Composer: Viacheslav Pakalin
- Series: Sherlock Holmes
- Engine: Unreal Engine 4
- Platforms: Nintendo Switch; PlayStation 4; PlayStation 5; Windows; Xbox One; Xbox Series X/S
- Release: April 11, 2023
- Genre: Adventure
- Mode: Single-player

Sherlock Holmes: The Awakened is an adventure video game developed and published by Frogwares. It is a remake of the 2007 game Sherlock Holmes: The Awakened and the tenth installment in the Sherlock Holmes series. The remake builds upon the original game with updated visuals, a new voice cast, and improved gameplay. The plot was also reworked to serve as a sequel to the 2021 game Sherlock Holmes Chapter One.

Sherlock Holmes: The Awakened was released for Nintendo Switch, PlayStation 4, PlayStation 5, Windows, Xbox One, and Xbox Series X/S on April 11, 2023. The game received generally positive reviews upon release.

== Synopsis ==
In September 1882, Sherlock Holmes takes up a case brought to him by his friend and roommate, Dr. John Watson: Kimiha, the Maori servant of one of Watson's patients, Captain Stenwick, has mysteriously disappeared from the man's estate. After surveying the house's grounds, Holmes concludes Kimiha was drugged, kidnapped and taken to the Port of London. Upon further investigation at the Port, Holmes and Watson find out several foreign workers have been disappearing after taking work from a smuggler known as "Dirty" Sommers. The duo search a warehouse Sommers operates out of and, during the search, Holmes is struck by visions of impossible, otherworldly environments. After Watson helps Holmes overcome these visions, the pair find a cult's ritual site underneath the warehouse, where an American private investigator who'd been looking into Sommers was killed in a human sacrifice and the kidnapped victims were packed into crates and shipped off out of the country. A review of the evidence leads Holmes to conclude that the victims were transported to the Black Edelweiss Institute, a psychiatric hospital in Switzerland.

In Switzerland, Watson procures a meeting with the Black Edelweiss' director, Professor Gygax, by pretending to be interested in studying the asylum's treatment techniques. Meanwhile, Holmes poses as the murdered American investigator to try to force his way into an inspection of the premises, only for Gygax to see through his ruse and have him forcefully sedated and confined in the asylum. After regaining consciousness, Holmes picks the lock on his cell and begins investigating the building; discovering that Gygax has been performing unethical, mind altering procedures on the people kidnapped by Sommers and shipped to her institution at the behest of a cult led by a British aristocrat. With the aid of Maurizio, a patient who believes himself to be Napoleon, and another, Gerda, whose doll Heidi orders her to kill people, Holmes gets a message to Watson about what he's uncovered. Deciding to conduct his own research, Watson discovers the former director of the institute, Professor Becker, was forcibly lobotomized by Gygax and committed to the institution. He uses this knowledge to make a fake note from Becker which gets the Professor out of her office and allows him to search it, where he finds evidence that the payments from the cult are being made with precious stones through an auction house in New Orleans. Watson helps Holmes escape from the patient wing of the asylum, after which the pair discover that Professor Gygax has been murdered by Gerda, whom Holmes unwittingly helped escape.

The duo travel to New Orleans to investigate the auction house through which Gygax and Sommers' client paid them for their services, but their efforts are impeded by Sheriff Grubb, the corrupt local police chief. Nevertheless, with the assistance of Lucy, a local madame, and Champagne, an informant, Holmes and Watson find out the man delivering the precious stones to the auction house was Ashmat, the butler of a local businessman called Errol Arneston. Holmes and Watson travel to Arneston's mansion in the French Quarter and find Eulah, a young black woman, outside the gates of the estate. She claims her mute, younger brother, Davy, who works for Arneston, has been missing for days and she has been unable to get inside the property. The duo find a way inside and discover a massacre has taken place at the mansion, where several workers were killed and Arneston was kidnapped and taken into the swamp. During their investigation, the pair are hindered once more by the Sheriff, who tries to lynch Eulah as a threat, but Watson manages to save her.

Holmes pieces together that Ashmat kidnapped Arneston and killed the servants when they interrupted. Davy also witnessed this but managed to avoid Ashmat by locking himself inside a room, where he has been hiding ever since. Eulah talks Davy into unlocking the room and telling the investigators everything he knows about Ashmat and Arneston. With this information and other clues found in the mansion, Holmes deduces that Ashmat worked for the cult unbeknownst to Arneston. He also finds out Arneston was in a secret relationship with Lucy, so the pair next speak to her and inform her about her lover's kidnapping. Shaken, Lucy tells them Arneston suspected Ashmat was involved in some kind of criminal operation and had once followed him to a secret lair in the Bayou. Holmes and Watson travel into the bayou with a boat borrowed from Champagne and, after avoiding an ambush by the Sheriff and his posse, they discover the ritual site, where they find Arneston, delirious and wounded but alive, as well as a strange book bound in human skin. Holmes suffers from more vivid visions of impossible underwater structures and has to be rescued by Watson after he nearly has a mental breakdown. The pair return Arneston to a grateful Lucy, who promises to help nurse him back to health and also begins plotting with Champagne to take revenge on the Sheriff.

The investigators return to London and, while Holmes rests to recover from nightmares he's suffered since New Orleans, Watson seeks the aid of bookshop owner and occult researcher Barnes. With his help and that of Sherlock's overbearing, government agent brother Mycroft, Watson determines the cult's leader is Lord Rochester, who is preparing a ritual of mass human sacrifice at the Ardnamurchan Lighthouse in Scotland to awaken an ancient deity. Holmes and Watson travel to the lighthouse in the middle of a violent storm. They find that Ashmat had mutilated himself to death after being driven mad by visions, and are later confronted by "Dirty" Sommers, whom Watson manages to subdue and tie up. Atop the structure, Rochester is conducting a ritual involving obsidian crystals that keep the brainwashed kidnapped victims hypnotized, whom he directs to sacrifice themselves to the Old Ones by jumping from the lighthouse. Holmes distracts Rochester while Watson destroys the crystals to free the entranced victims. The cult leader tries to persuade Holmes of the truth of his visions, insisting none of them were hallucinations or madness but rather Holmes' superior mind perceiving the true reality others cannot bear, but Holmes resists his influence and distracts him long enough for Watson to rescue his victims. Distraught at his ritual being disrupted, Rochester throws himself into the sea as a giant tidal wave approaches. Holmes stands before the approaching wave, insisting he must see if Rochester's proclamations were true, but he is dragged inside the safety of the lighthouse by Watson.

Weeks later, Holmes and Watson are back in London. The pair rescued all the surviving victims but Holmes is still haunted by nightmares. Watson tries to write about the case, but Holmes insists that word of Rochester's actions should not be made public, lest other madmen be inspired to follow in his footsteps. As Holmes begins to have another vision, Watson gives him a sedative to help him sleep and then burns his manuscript about their adventure.

== Release ==
The game was teased under the codename Project Palianytsia in May 2022 before it was formally announced in July 2022. A Kickstarter campaign was launched on August 4. The developer stated that the Kickstarter funding was meant to provide a financial safety net for the game. The game was funded on Kickstarter on September 5. The game's release was delayed by about a month due to the ongoing Russo-Ukrainian War. One of the development difficulties were caused by the consistent Russian attacks on Ukrainian energy generating systems which lead to the repeated scheduled blackouts across the country.

== Reception ==
Reception

Aggregate score
Aggregator	Score
Metacritic	75/100 (PS5); 72/100 (PC); 73/100 (XSX)

Review scores
Publication	Score
NME	4/5 (XSX)
PC Gamer (US)	80/100 (PC)
CGMagazine	7.5/10 (PS5)
Pocket Tactics	6/10 (Switch)

Over 10,000 copies of the game were sold within the first 10 days of release.

The game received weighted average ratings of 72 through 75 out of 100 according to Metacritic across its PC and ninth-generation console versions.

PC Gamer called the game "cleverly designed, atmospheric, and polished" but criticized the short length and the DLC policy where all the side quests have to be bought separately. Rock Paper Shotgun recommended the game to fans of the series only. NME liked the removal of combat from the game but disliked the puzzle design in other world sections. CGMagazine called the game "a solid entry to the franchise". Pocket Tactics liked the game but didn't recommend playing it on the Switch due to performance issues.
