= Sherlock Holmes: The Case of the Silver Earring =

2004 video game

- European cover art
- Developer: Frogwares
- Publishers: PAL: Digital Jesters; NA: Ubisoft; WW: Frogwares
- Designer: Jalil Amr
- Series: Sherlock Holmes
- Platforms: Windows, Wii
- Release: Windows: EU: 27 August 2004; NA: 28 September 2004; AU: 30 September 2004; Wii: AU: 17 November 2011; EU: 18 November 2011
- Genre: Adventure
- Mode: Single-player

Sherlock Holmes: The Case of the Silver Earring (known in North America as Secret of the Silver Earring and as Sherlock Holmes: The Silver Earring) is a 2004 adventure game developed by Frogwares and published for Windows by Digital Jesters in Europe and Ubisoft in North America. While the game is "inspired by The Adventures of Sherlock Holmes", it uses an original plotline — set in London in 1897 — and allows the player to investigate a murder as Sherlock Holmes and Dr. John H. Watson. By 2010, Secret of the Silver Earring had sold 500,000 copies worldwide. A version for Wii was released in Australia and Europe in 2011.

The second in the Sherlock Holmes series of adventure games developed by Frogwares, it was preceded by the 2002 game Sherlock Holmes: The Mystery of the Mummy, and was followed by Sherlock Holmes: The Awakened in 2007. The game acts as a prequel to Mystery of the Mummy - despite being released two years after the earlier game, it is actually set two years earlier (in 1897 as opposed to 1899).

== Plot ==
In 1897, Sherlock Holmes receives a letter from his brother Mycroft asking him and Dr. Watson to investigate a singer performing at a birthday party held by construction baron Sir Melvyn Bromsby for his daughter Lavinia. During the party, Bromsby is shot dead by an unknown assassin. Working with Scotland Yard Inspector Lestrade, Holmes and Watson identify two suspects. One is Lavinia, who has a strained relationship with her father. The other is Grimble, Bromsby's partner, who he apparently caught embezzling.

During the investigation, three more corpses are found which are connected. The first is Roy Hunter, a bartender at the party. The second is Horace Fowlett, Bromsby's lawyer. The third is an unknown man, later identified as Bromsby's troubled nephew, Wyatt Collins. Holmes also connects the case to the disappearance of Veronica Davenport and Jeffries, actors who co-owned a theatre troupe Bromsby bought. Due to their being lovers despite Veronica also being in a relationship with the third owner, Richards, he was suspected, but ultimately let go.

Eventually, Holmes deduces the culprits to be Lt. Herrington, a soldier in a relationship with Lavinia, his manservant Spencer, and Collins. Spencer is actually Jeffries, who killed Davenport in a jealous rage and convinced Herrington to help him disappear. The two worked with Collins to take Bromsby's fortune. At the party, Jeffries disguised himself as Herrington, allowing the real Herrington to shoot Bromsby. Hunter was killed for recognizing the fake Herrington. Collins tried to steal Bromsby's will and killed Fowlett when he couldn't find it. When Herrington became engaged to Lavinia, Collins was no longer needed and killed. Grimble meanwhile had embezzled to help families of workers Bromsby had wronged, which Bromsby approved of.

Holmes tricks Herrington into confessing by falsely claiming Scotland Yard will find evidence of the murders and they're arrested. Holmes and Watson then prepare to investigate the singer as Mycroft requested.

== Development ==
Development of the game started in January 2003. The game's story and design is credited to Jalil Amr, based on an unpublished pastiche novel by Amr. Both sound and voiceovers for the English version are credited to Pteroduction Sound, Alexander Dudko, and Sergey Geraschenko. Unlike the English version, however, the German voice cast is listed at the Internet Movie Database. Music within the game consists of compositions by Antonín Dvořák, Edvard Grieg, Robert Schumann, and Pyotr Tchaikovsky.

== Gameplay ==
Silver Earring is a point-and-click (mouse controlled) third person adventure in which the players play as both Holmes and Watson. Clicking in the general direction will usually cause the character to move in that direction. When there is the footsteps icon, clicking will take the character to the next "authorized" spot. Double-clicking makes Holmes or Watson run.

Right-clicking brings up the inventory bar. Throughout the game, Holmes's tools of the trade (a magnifying glass, measuring tape and test tube) are in inventory. These are frequently used. Inventory also includes a notebook, which is essential to understanding the game. The notebook has transcripts of witnesses' conversations. Also, the notebook contains documents and an analysis of the physical evidence.

As Holmes, the players spend time searching for important clues, most of which the bumbling police force will miss. Items are at least partly visible, though some don't become "hot" until an action in the game triggers them. The players can also analyze various clues using Holmes's desktop laboratory.

== Reception ==
=== Critical reviews ===
Reception

Aggregate scores
Aggregator	Score
GameRankings	70.23%
Metacritic	68 of 100

Review scores
Publication	Score
1Up.com	B
Adventure Gamers	3.5 of 5
Computer Gaming World	4 of 5
GameSpot	7.3 of 10
GameSpy	3.5 of 5
IGN	8.3 of 10
PC Format	46%
PC Gamer (US)	24%
The Times	4 of 5

The computer version of The Case of the Silver Earring was met with average reception, as GameRankings gave it a score of 70.23%, while Metacritic gave it 68 out of 100.

=== Sales ===
According to Christopher Kellner of German publisher DTP Entertainment, The Case of the Silver Earring achieved "incredibly high sales" in its first three weeks in Germany, and became a "big commercial success" in the region. Alongside titles such as The Black Mirror and The Moment of Silence, it contributed to DTP's large-scale growth during 2004. Silver Earring's publisher in Britain, Digital Jesters, likewise reported "very promising" early sales figures by late 2004. During the August 21–28 period, the game debuted in 14th place on Britain's full-price computer game sales rankings, compiled by Chart-Track. It held the position the following week, but dropped to position 20 in its third week, after which it exited the full-price top 20.

Frogwares estimated global sales of roughly 50,000 units for Silver Earring by January 2005, a number it considered strong for the genre but unsatisfactory overall. By late 2006, the game and its predecessor, Mystery of the Mummy, had reached combined sales above 500,000 copies in Europe. The first four Sherlock Holmes titles from Frogwares—Mummy, Silver Earring, The Awakened and Nemesis—totaled roughly 1.5 million global sales by February 2009. According to Frogwares, The Case of the Silver Earring alone sold 500,000 units worldwide by May 2010.

== Music ==
The game's soundtrack has the following pieces from late-romantic era composers:

- Robert Schumann - Piano Quartet in E flat major, Op. 47, II. Scherzo: Molto vivace
- Pyotr Ilyich Tchaikovsky - Souvenir d'un lieu cher, Op. 42, III. Mélodie ("Chant sans paroles")
- Antonín Dvořák - Humoresque in G flat major, No. 7, Op. 101 (For Piano, Violin & Cello)
- Edvard Grieg - Violin Sonata No. 2 in G major, Op. 13, III. Allegro animato

The remaining music, such as in Mr. Fowlett's house, are original to the video game.

== See also ==
- Return to Mysterious Island
- Syberia II
- The Moment of Silence
- The Westerner
