= Sherlock Holmes (video game series) =

Series of adventure video games

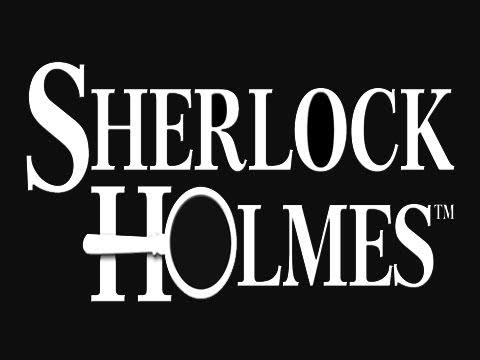
- Sherlock Holmes series logo used since mid-2007
- Genre: Adventure
- Developer: Frogwares
- Publishers: The Adventure Company; Ubisoft; Digital Jesters; Focus Home Interactive; THQ; Atlus; Bigben Interactive
- Platforms: Microsoft Windows; Nintendo DS; Nintendo 3DS; Nintendo Switch; PlayStation 3; PlayStation 4; PlayStation 5; Wii; Xbox 360; Xbox One; Xbox Series X/S
- First release: Sherlock Holmes: The Mystery of the Mummy; 29 December 2002
- Latest release: Sherlock Holmes: The Awakened; 11 April 2023

Sherlock Holmes is a series of adventure games developed by Frogwares. The games are based on Arthur Conan Doyle's Sherlock Holmes stories, featuring the detective Sherlock Holmes and his companion Dr. John H. Watson. While the franchise is based on Doyle's stories, each game has an original plot and storyline.

== Overview ==
Each game in the series lets the player control Holmes or Dr. Watson from either a first-person or third-person perspective. This adventure game series mainly consists of puzzles to solve during the course of the game, both by the use of Holmes' abductive reasoning and Watson's assistance. It also requires gamers to find clues and evidence hidden in the environment. Holmes must take this information back to his labs, both in his flat at 221 B Baker St. and elsewhere. Clues are examined under a microscope or combined with solvents to separate pertinent elements.

The chief objective of the games is to solve the main mystery in the story, but the games also involve side investigations not central to the plot. The series takes Holmes all over the world, including to New Orleans, Switzerland, and Scotland.

== Main series ==
Release timeline
2002	The Mystery of the Mummy
2003
2004	The Case of the Silver Earring
2005
2006
2007	The Awakened
2007	Versus Arsène Lupin
2008
2009	Versus Jack the Ripper
2010
2011
2012	The Testament of Sherlock Holmes
2013
2014	Crimes & Punishments
2015
2016	The Devil's Daughter
2017
2018
2019
2020
2021	Chapter One
2022
2023	The Awakened

=== The Mystery of the Mummy ===
Originally developed for Microsoft Windows, the series first began in September 2002 with Sherlock Holmes: The Mystery of the Mummy. The debut is in the first-person perspective and follows Sherlock Holmes' investigation of a British archaeologist's mansion. The game was resurrected and expanded for the Nintendo DS allowing puzzles to be solved with the stylus and touchscreen.

=== The Case of the Silver Earring ===
The second game in the series, Sherlock Holmes: The Case of the Silver Earring, followed in October 2004, and introduced the third-person perspective. In it, Holmes and Watson investigate the murder of a construction tycoon, Sir Melvyn Bromsby; with his daughter, Lavinia, among the suspects.

=== The Awakened ===
The third game in the series, Sherlock Holmes: The Awakened, was released in February 2007. It is the first game to feature first-person perspective in real-time 3D. The game follows an original plotline as Holmes and Dr. Watson investigate a series of strange disappearances related to the Cthulhu Mythos. Among the more positive reviews for the game, GameSpot gave it a rating of 8.3 out of 10, praising the storyline and stating that it was told "brilliantly", calling it a "Cthulhu-infused Victoriana". A remastered version was released in 2008 offering a third-person perspective in addition to the first-person perspective. This game won GameSpot's Best Use of a License Award.

=== Sherlock Holmes Versus Arsène Lupin (aka Nemesis) ===
The fourth game in the series, Sherlock Holmes Versus Arsène Lupin (also known as Sherlock Holmes: Nemesis), was released in the third quarter of 2007. The game's antagonist is Arsène Lupin, a fictional gentleman thief created by French writer Maurice Leblanc. It begins at Holmes' residence at 221B Baker Street in London, where Holmes and Dr. Watson find a letter from Lupin. The thief states in the letter he will steal five items of great value to England.

=== Sherlock Holmes Versus Jack the Ripper ===
A fifth installment, Sherlock Holmes Versus Jack the Ripper, was released in March 2009 and had Sherlock Holmes against the infamous serial killer Jack the Ripper. This is the first game in the series to be released on console, specifically Xbox 360. The game consists of poems, puzzles and tasks that take Holmes from one clue to the next.

=== The Testament of Sherlock Holmes ===
A sixth installment, The Testament of Sherlock Holmes, was released for PC, Xbox 360 PlayStation 3 in September 2012, and Nintendo Switch in 2023.

The Testament of Sherlock Holmes is set in the London of 1895, with Holmes presented as the main suspect in a case in which he is unable to prove his innocence. It was developed primarily for consoles, and features a new graphic engine and gameplay mechanics.

=== Crimes & Punishments ===
Sherlock Holmes: Crimes & Punishments is the seventh game in the series. The game was released on in September 2014 for PC, Xbox 360, Xbox One, PlayStation 3, and PlayStation 4.

=== The Devil's Daughter ===
The eighth game, Sherlock Holmes: The Devil's Daughter, was released in June 2016. It is the first game since 2007 not to be published by Focus Home Interactive; instead it was published by Bigben Interactive. No reasons were given for the change of publisher. It was released on the Xbox One, PlayStation 4 and PC.

Kerry Shale was originally expected to reprise his role as Sherlock, but was later confirmed by Frogwares that the game would focus on a different incarnation of Sherlock Holmes and features a new actor Alex Jordan in the role.

=== Chapter One ===
The ninth game, Sherlock Holmes Chapter One, was released in November 2021 for PC and PS4, as well as Xbox Series X/S and PS5.

The game is set as an origin story with Sherlock Holmes, being aged twenty-one, returning to the island of Cordona, where he spent a part of his childhood. The main plot revolves around Holmes slowly regaining memories of his mother's death, while also solving different cases on the island.

It is the first game in the series self-published by Frogwares and mechanically takes heavy inspiration from their previous title The Sinking City (for example, being set in an open-world environment).

=== The Awakened (remake) ===
The tenth game in the series, Sherlock Holmes: The Awakened, was released in April 2023. It is a remake of the original version of The Awakened released in 2007 and was released for PC, PS4, PS5, Xbox One, Xbox Series X/S and Nintendo Switch.

=== Summary ===
Title	Year	Chronology (Classic/New)	Platform										Gameplay style
Title	Year	Chronology (Classic/New)	PC	Xbox 360	Xbox One	Xbox Series S/X	PS3	PS4	PS5	DS	Wii	Switch	Gameplay style
Sherlock Holmes: The Mystery of the Mummy	2002	8th	Yes							Yes			Adventure, first-person
Sherlock Holmes: The Case of the Silver Earring	2004	7th	Yes								Yes		Adventure, third-person
Sherlock Holmes: The Awakened	2007	2nd (Classic)	Yes										Adventure, first-person in real-time 3D, third-person and first-person for remastered version
Sherlock Holmes Versus Arsène Lupin	2007	4th	Yes										Adventure, first or third person
Sherlock Holmes Versus Jack the Ripper	2009	1st (Classic)	Yes	Yes									Adventure, first or third person
The Testament of Sherlock Holmes	2012	5th	Yes	Yes			Yes	Yes				Yes	Adventure
Sherlock Holmes: Crimes & Punishments	2014	3rd	Yes	Yes	Yes		Yes	Yes				Yes	Adventure
Sherlock Holmes: The Devil's Daughter	2016	6th	Yes		Yes			Yes				Yes	Adventure
Sherlock Holmes Chapter One	2021	1st (New)	Yes			Yes		Yes	Yes				Adventure, mystery
Sherlock Holmes: The Awakened	2023	2nd (New)	Yes		Yes	Yes		Yes	Yes			Yes	Remake of Sherlock Holmes: The Awakened from 2007

== Common elements ==
=== Items and tools ===
Throughout several games, Holmes uses his magnifying glass when he inspects things such as crime scenes, mutilated bodies, fingerprints, gashes and scratches—and uses it mostly for finding evidence. It is the only item to appear in most of the series.

He also uses his microscope in checking clues unseen by the naked eye. He has a chemistry set in his flat which he uses to dissolve solute, dissect clues, and find evidence. Each game also provides exploration to find items that Holmes can use later in the game to help solve the case.

=== Gameplay ===
Much of the gameplay throughout the whole series consists of themes and gameplay found in a classic adventure game. Players are encouraged to explore the games' sandbox landscapes, where clues are hidden in them. Point-and-click game-play is also prevalent. The series also lets the players interrogate certain people to gather evidence for the investigation. There are also instances where Holmes disguises himself in order to infiltrate a hostile location to get more evidence. The series lets the player play both Holmes and Watson in either first-person or third-person perspective. Holmes' game-play mostly consists of investigations and finding evidence to come to a conclusion. Watson's game-play mostly consists of him running errands for Holmes and assisting in the investigation, but there are sometimes instances where he takes control of the investigation.

Sherlock Holmes: The Mystery of the Mummy was the first to use the first-person perspective in the series. The Case of the Silver Earring is a point-and-click (mouse-controlled) third-person adventure, and the first one to use this perspective in the series. Clicking in the general direction will usually cause the character to move in that direction. As Holmes, the players spend time searching for important clues, most of which the bumbling police force have missed. Items are at least partly visible, though some are not interactive until an action in the game triggers them. The players can also analyze various clues using Holmes' desktop laboratory.

The Awakened was the first Frogwares title to allow gameplay to take place in an entirely real-time 3D landscape and from a first-person perspective, losing the pre-rendered backgrounds of its predecessors. Like other Sherlock Holmes games by Frogwares, it has an open world environment in every location that can have hidden clues and interactions with NPCs. The inventory system saves all objects, documents, and map locations for later use and can also be used to combine objects. The game can be viewed from a first or third person perspective. It provides the players with icons to indicate what actions Holmes can take within his world, like pick up something or talk to someone.

== Development and inspiration ==
=== Origin ===
The characters of Sherlock Holmes and Dr. Watson in the game series are modeled using the characters from the ITV series The Adventures of Sherlock Holmes and the portrayals by Jeremy Brett and David Burke, respectively.

=== Graphics and technology ===
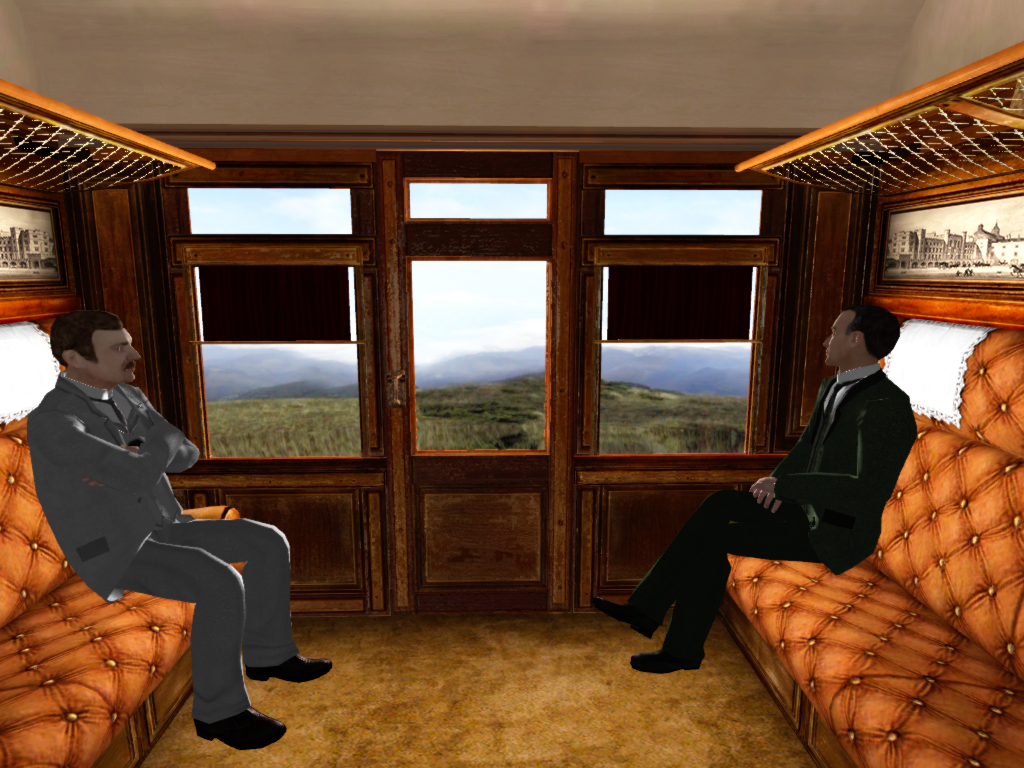
The Awakened uses fully real-time graphics.

Early games in the series use pre-rendered backgrounds, using them to hide clues in the scene and provide accessible open world landscapes. It features a combination of 2D and 3D styles of view in the background.

The Awakened was the first Frogwares title to allow gameplay to take place in an entirely real-time 3D landscape and from a first-person perspective. Frogwares made a well rendered 3D environment without the normal excessive pixilation that haunted many adventure games. This is mixed with a lush presentation of 19th century London, depicting its characteristic dimly-lit lonely alleyways. The graphics quality was an improvement from all the previous games in the series. Animation in particular became more smoother and much more natural-looking. The third-person camera can also be moved around the character independently, which helps both to find an angle that is comfortable for the players and to take in the surroundings while standing still.

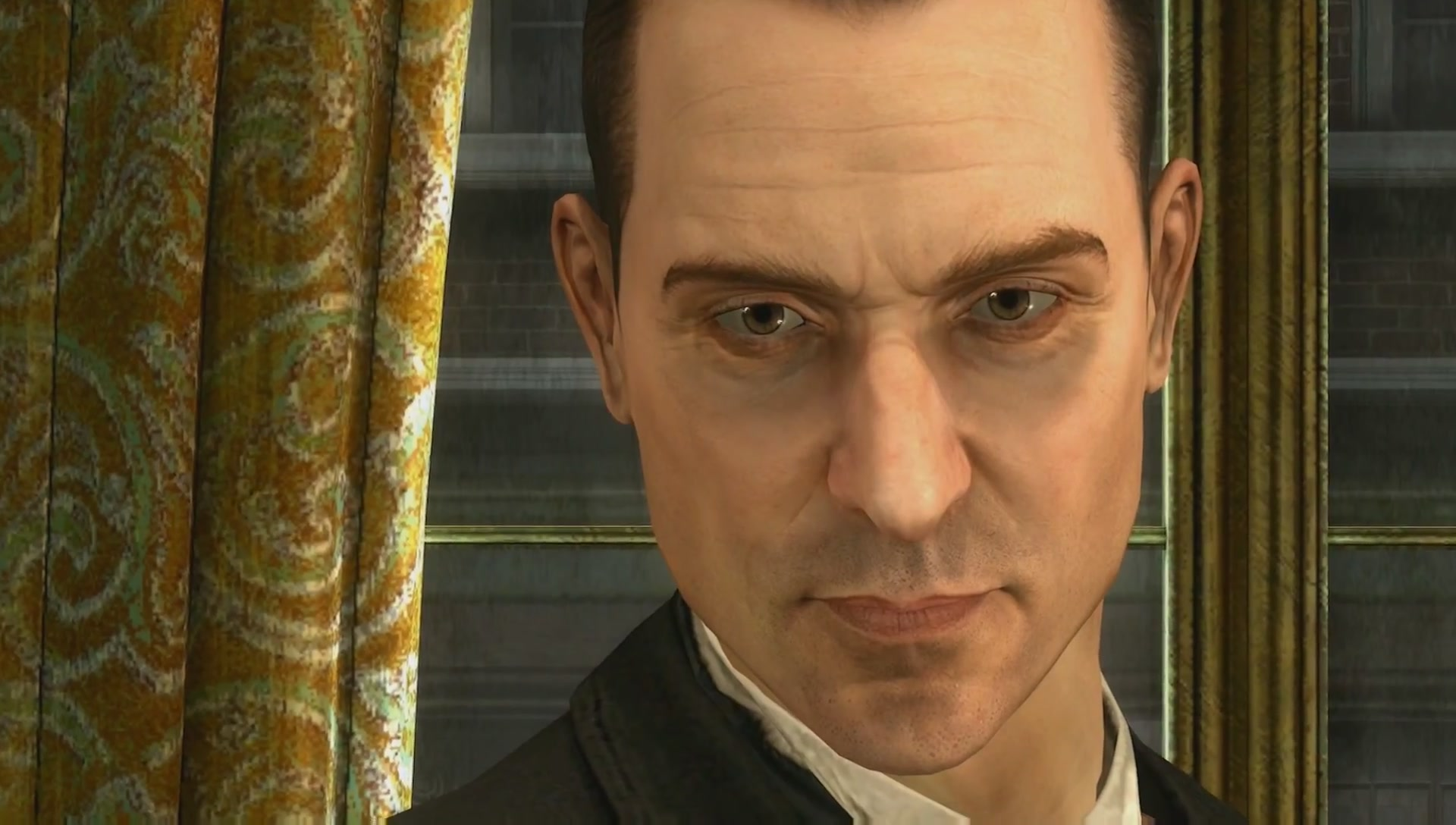
Holmes' face showing a leap in the series' graphics and the use of motion capture

These upgrades are part of a broader move to attract more console players. After the last game, Frogwares got feedback, from Xbox players in particular, that they wanted more adventure games with 3D graphics and also production values to match what other genres are offering. Frogwares was eager to deliver, though the developer did not forget PC platform, as some speculated.

Sherlock Holmes Versus Jack the Ripper used drawings to depict its murder victims, hiding the full horror of the scenes out of respect for the real historical victims. The new games in the series differ from this (especially The Testament of Sherlock Holmes); holding no restraint in displaying the grisly murders, the characters depicted are purely fictional.

The Testament of Sherlock Holmes is the first in the series to have a great leap in graphics. Designers used motion capture to get realism in characterization. The game also benefits from a new light and shadow system, various post-treatment image effects, and high quality voice-over and cinematographic direction.

== Casual games ==
In addition to the main series, Frogwares (by itself or through its casual division Waterlily) has developed four casual games, with simplified gameplay. They're generally less faithful to the canon, with fantasy and supernatural themes, for a younger target audience.

Release timeline
2008	Sherlock Holmes: The Mystery of the Persian Carpet
2009
2010	Sherlock Holmes and the Mystery of Osborne House
2011	Sherlock Holmes and the Hound of the Baskervilles
2012	Sherlock Holmes: The Mystery of the Frozen City

=== Sherlock Holmes: The Mystery of the Persian Carpet ===
Sherlock Holmes: The Mystery of the Persian Carpet was released in mid-2008. Unlike the preceding games, The Mystery of the Persian Carpet is primarily an object hunt game. The game was rated poorly and was generally considered a disappointing follow-up to Sherlock Holmes Versus Jack the Ripper. GameSpot's review of the game found it "not all that appropriate as a sequel to the other adventures that Sherlock and Watson have been starring in during the past few years".

=== Sherlock Holmes and the Mystery of Osborne House ===
Sherlock Holmes and the Mystery of Osborne House is the first in the series to be made and published for the Nintendo DS. In this game, Holmes investigates a robbery and a deep conspiracy in Buckingham Palace.

=== Sherlock Holmes and the Hound of the Baskervilles ===
Sherlock Holmes and the Hound of the Baskervilles, released in 2011 for PC and 2012 for iOS devices and loosely based on the novel of the same name, is a hidden object game that features heavy supernatural themes. While the titular hound in the original story is a legend used to cover up a murder, the hound in the game is a supernatural monster associated with a curse, and the player is assisted by magical items and the ghosts of deceased members of the Baskerville family. Later re-released for Nintendo Switch 10 years later in 2022. There was mis-information of a DS port existing but no trailers, screenshots or gameplay has been able to be found. Released on Nintendo Switch in October 6th, 2022.

=== Sherlock Holmes: The Mystery of the Frozen City ===
Sherlock Holmes: The Mystery of the Frozen City was released in October 2012 for the Nintendo 3DS. According to review aggregator Metacritic, the game received mixed to negative reviews.

=== Summary ===
Title	Year	Chronology	Platform						Gameplay style
Title	Year	Chronology	PC	3DS	DS	iOS	NS	Sw	Gameplay style
Sherlock Holmes: The Mystery of the Persian Carpet	2008		•						Primarily an object hunt game
Sherlock Holmes and the Mystery of Osborne House	2010				•				Casual game
Sherlock Holmes and the Hound of the Baskervilles	2011		•			•	•	•	Casual game
Sherlock Holmes: The Mystery of the Frozen City	2012			•					Casual game

== Reception ==
Aggregate review scores As of 25 April 2023; PC scores only.
Game	Year	GameRankings	Metacritic
Sherlock Holmes: The Mystery of the Mummy	2002	63%	61/100
Sherlock Holmes: The Case of the Silver Earring	2004	70%	68/100
Sherlock Holmes: The Awakened	2007	71%	72/100
Sherlock Holmes Versus Arsène Lupin	2007	73%	71/100
Sherlock Holmes Versus Jack the Ripper	2009	72%	73/100
The Testament of Sherlock Holmes	2012	68%	73/100
Sherlock Holmes: Crimes & Punishments	2014	75%	73/100
Sherlock Holmes: The Devil's Daughter	2016	69%	71/100
Sherlock Holmes: Chapter One	2021	— (Note: GameRankings ceased operations on December 9, 2019, and was redirected to Metacritic.)	69/100
Sherlock Holmes: The Awakened	2023	—	76/100

The games are a commercial success. The series has sold "3 or 4 million copies", mostly on PC, as of 2012.

=== Recognition ===
A few titles of the series have also garnered awards from various gaming websites and communities. Sherlock Holmes: The Awakened earned GameSpot's "Best Use of a License" award in 2007. It was also nominated for GameSpot's and IGN's "Best PC Adventure Game of 2007" awards. In 2011, Adventure Gamers named The Awakened the 80th-best adventure game ever released.

The Testament of Sherlock Holmes was awarded "Best of the Rest" in the Honorary Aggie Award category by the website Adventure Gamers, saying that "the surprising story of Sherlock's apparent fall from grace was thoroughly engaging right from the start and kept the momentum up through well-crafted characters and plenty of twists and turns. Topped off with stunning visuals and an impressive orchestral soundtrack, this was Frogwares at their finest".
