= Journey to the Center of the Earth (2003 video game) =

- Developer: Frogwares
- Publisher: Micro Application
- Platform: Microsoft Windows
- Release: October 16, 2003
- Genre: Graphic adventure
- Mode: Single-player

Journey to the Center of the Earth is a 2003 point-and-click adventure video game developed by Ukrainian studio Frogwares and published by Micro Application for Windows. It was distributed in the United States by Viva Media.

The game is loosely based on the novel of the same name by Jules Verne and follows photojournalist Ariane as the player character.

== Reception ==
Jeux Video felt the game was "fun and original" and that it gave the player an opportunity to experience the "dreamlike underground world" described in Jules Verne's novel. IGN described it as a "decent title that keeps you gaming for cheap" but criticized its "clunky interface and unforgiving puzzles". GameSpy praised its puzzles and story and disliked the interface.
