= Sherlock Holmes Versus Jack the Ripper =

2009 video game

- European cover art
- Developers: Frogwares; Spiders (X360)
- Publisher: Frogwares; Focus Home Interactive: NA: The Adventure Company
- Series: Sherlock Holmes
- Platforms: Microsoft Windows, Xbox 360
- Release: Windows: FRA: 30 April 2009; NA: 26 May 2009; AU: 29 May 2009; UK: 20 November 2009; Xbox 360: FRA: 19 November 2009; UK: 20 November 2009; NA: 23 April 2010
- Genre: Adventure
- Mode: Single-player

Sherlock Holmes Versus Jack the Ripper (French: Sherlock Holmes contre Jack l'Éventreur) is a 2009 adventure game for Microsoft Windows and Xbox 360, developed by Ukrainian studio Frogwares and distributed by Focus Home Interactive. It is the fifth game in the Sherlock Holmes series of adventure games developed by Frogwares. The game takes place in the London district of Whitechapel in 1888, the historical site of the Jack the Ripper murders.

Following the remastered version of Sherlock Holmes: The Awakened and Sherlock Holmes Versus Arsène Lupin, Sherlock Holmes versus Jack the Ripper offered the ability to play in a third-person perspective in addition to the first-person perspective.

== Plot ==
In early September 1888, Dr. Watson reads in The Star of the murder of Mary Ann Nichols in Whitechapel and alerts Sherlock Holmes, who takes up the case. When Inspector Frederick Abberline visits 221B Baker Street to ask Holmes not to interfere with the police investigation, Holmes carries on regardless, visiting Whitechapel in disguise.

Over the following weeks Holmes and Watson examine the scenes of the murders of Annie Chapman, Elizabeth Stride and Catherine Eddowes, gather witness statements and test their theories through reconstructions. Holmes concludes that the "Dear Boss letter" is a hoax by Thomas Bulling, a journalist at the Central News Agency hungry for a scoop, who coined the name "Jack the Ripper" with the folklore figure Spring-heeled Jack in mind. By redrawing the Goulston Street graffito in chalk and pouring water over it, he shows that the message could not have survived the night's rain unless it was written shortly before its discovery, and so was probably left by the killer. Reviewing earlier attacks in the district, he rules out the assault on Emma Smith but attributes the killing of Martha Tabram to the same man.

Holmes eliminates a series of suspects, including John Pizer ("Leather Apron"), the street gambler George "Squibby" Cullen, Dr. Francis Tumblety, the painter Walter Sickert, the widower James Hardiman, and Abraham Solomonovitch, a Jewish former butcher who helps the investigation. From the witness statements and his own deductions he profiles the killer as a poor, right-handed butcher aged about 33, roughly 5 ft 3 in (160 cm) tall with fair hair and moustache, who bears a grudge against the Jewish community, has a child suffering from syphilis, and lives in Aldgate.

After the murder of Mary Jane Kelly on 9 November, Holmes reconstructs her mutilated body in clay at Baker Street. While looking for the witness Joseph Hyam Levy, he calls by mistake at 36 Middlesex Street, now the home of another butcher, Jacob Levy, whose wife and syphilitic son match his profile. That evening Levy silently re-enacts his crimes in front of Holmes. Holmes refuses to hand him over to Scotland Yard: he says he serves the truth rather than justice, and he fears that exposing a Jewish killer would set off antisemitic violence in Whitechapel. He asks Watson not to write about the case and suggests he invent a story about a ghostly hound that glows in the dark instead, a nod to The Hound of the Baskervilles.

== Gameplay ==
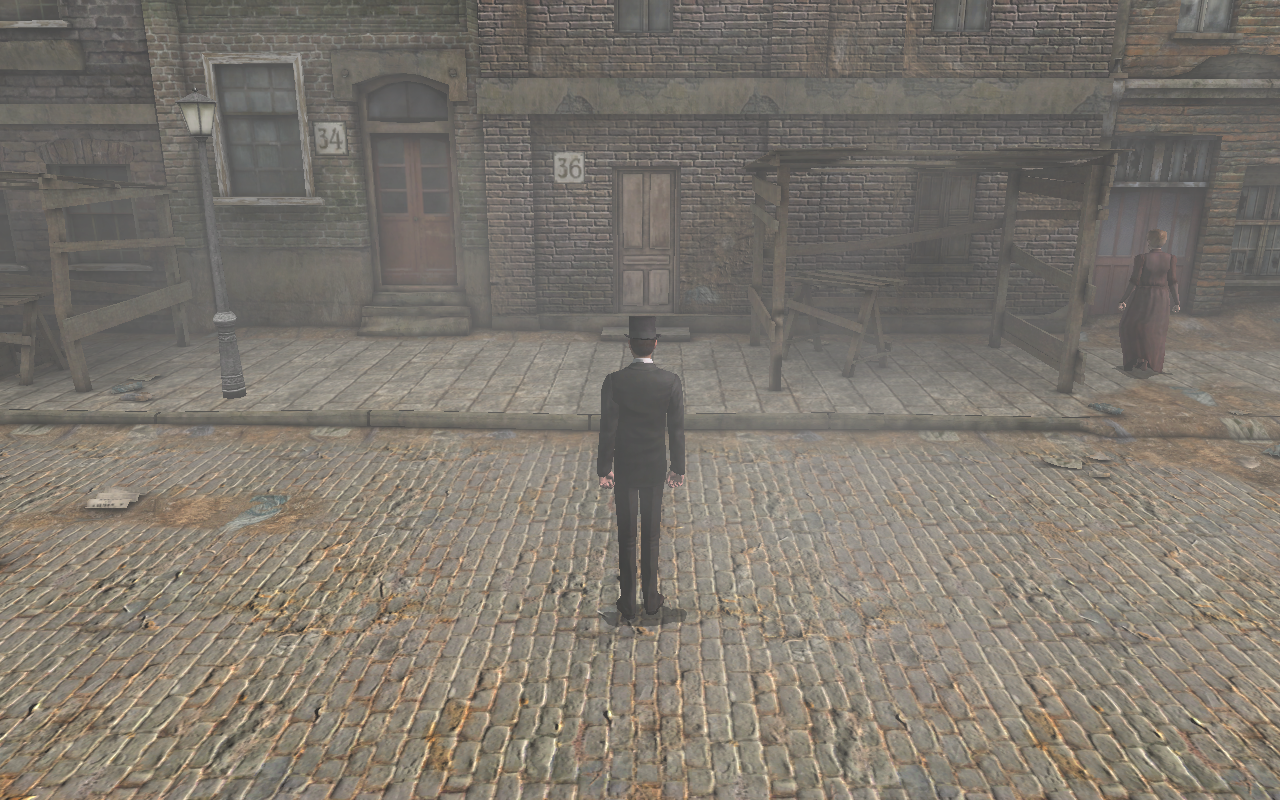
Third-person gameplay as Sherlock Holmes

The player can play from a first- or third-person perspective as Holmes or Watson. Holmes and Watson arrive to inspect each crime scene after the murder takes place, giving the player a close-up look at Jack's work.

Each crime scene allows the player to reconstruct what happened, taking the pieces of evidence and linking them together until forming a conclusion. For instance, when examining the body of Annie Chapman, the player discovers pertinent clues such as blood on a fence, bruises under the right side of the jawbone, and a bloated tongue, which allows the player to deduce that the victim was killed while lying down after being choked with a left hand. These deductions are chosen from pulldown lists.

The player is also required to solve mysteries at Holmes' famous 221B Baker Street flat, a process which involves combing through dialogue and documents to establish murder times, before developing detailed theories about why the murders are being committed. The player pieces together torn-up notes, assembles objects, and takes on sliding-block challenges.

== Characters ==
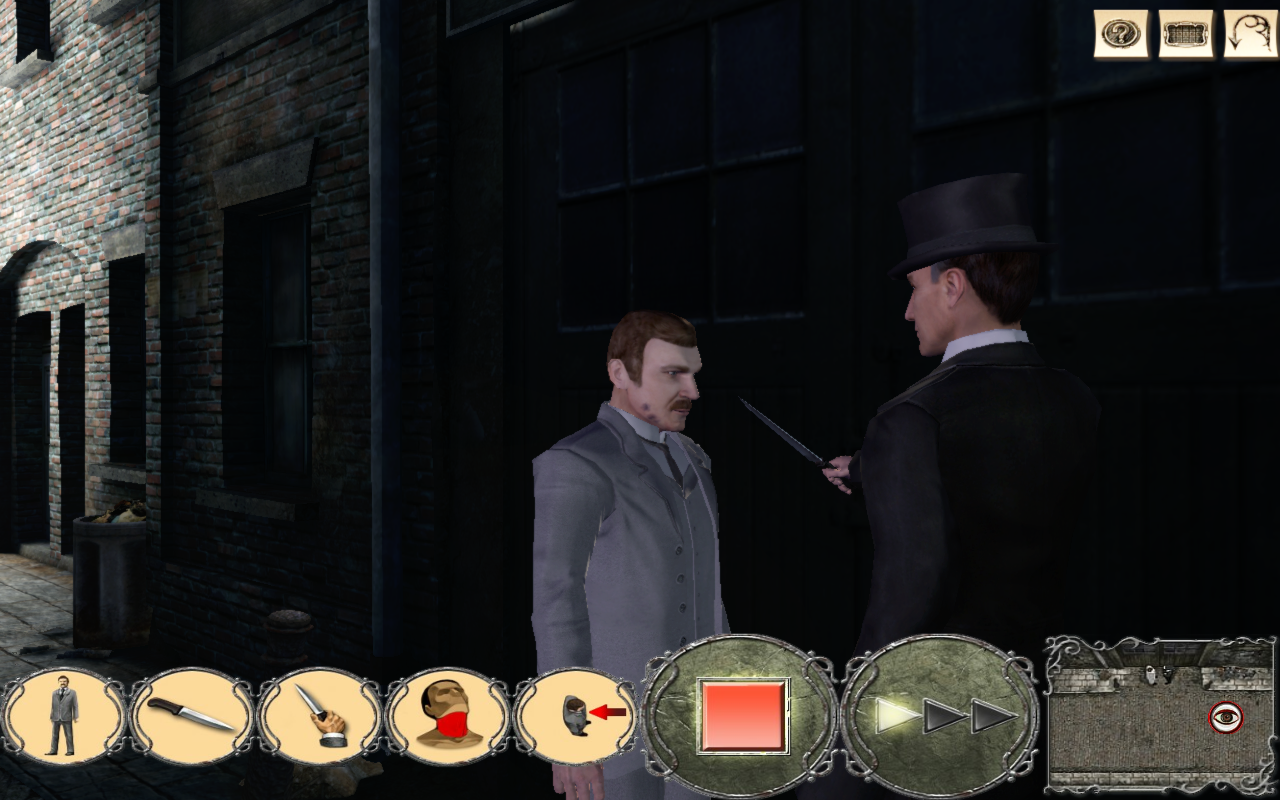
Doctor John Watson and Sherlock Holmes

- Sherlock Holmes: Famous consulting detective who lives in 221b Baker Street with his loyal friend Dr. John Watson. Holmes' methods are unique and he must put all of his exceptional powers of deduction in this case.
- Doctor John H. Watson: A doctor and Holmes' best friend. He will do whatever is possible in order to help his friend catch Jack the Ripper.
- Jack the Ripper: The serial killer who strikes at the sinister district of Whitechapel. He kills prostitutes with no mercy and mocks the police, and is regarded both as a madman and a genius.
- Inspector Frederick Abberline: A police inspector who refuses Holmes' help. He believes he can easily solve the case.
- Baker Street Irregulars: A gang of poor children who help Holmes and Watson in their difficult case.
- Francis Tumblety: An American doctor who happens to be in London at the time of the murders, known to dislike women in general.
- Walter Sickert: A painter who frequents the local brothel where the Ripper's victims were known to have worked.
- Jacob Levy: A butcher with a poor reputation due to past misdeeds.

== Reception ==
Reception

Aggregate scores
Aggregator	Score
GameRankings	71.94% (17 reviews)
Metacritic	73% (26 reviews)

Review scores
Publication	Score
1Up.com	C−
GameSpot	7.0 of 10
GamesRadar+	6/10
GameZone	7.5/10
IGN	8.0 of 10
The Guardian	3/5

The game received mixed to positive reviews from critics. GameSpot negatively commented on the way the player gathers clues in the game, as they must first run errands for the police.

== See also ==
- Dust and Shadow: An Account of the Ripper Killings by Dr. John H. Watson
