= Sherlock Holmes: Crimes & Punishments =

2014 video game

- Developer: Frogwares
- Publishers: Frogwares; Focus Home Interactive (Note: According to Frogwares, Focus Home Interactive was only the distributor.)
- Composer: Kevin MacLeod
- Series: Sherlock Holmes
- Engine: Unreal Engine 3
- Platforms: Microsoft Windows; PlayStation 3; PlayStation 4; Xbox 360; Xbox One; Nintendo Switch
- Release: Windows, PS3, PS4, X360, XBO: AU: 30 September 2014; NA: 30 September 2014; EU: 3 October 2014; Nintendo Switch: WW: 3 February 2022
- Genre: Adventure
- Mode: Single-player

Sherlock Holmes: Crimes & Punishments is an adventure mystery video game in the Sherlock Holmes series developed by Frogwares in 2014 and distributed by Focus Home Interactive from 2014 to 2019 for Microsoft Windows, PlayStation 3, PlayStation 4, Xbox 360, and Xbox One. Frogwares regained the publishing rights to the title on Steam and the game reappeared on other platforms in the start of 2020. A Nintendo Switch version was released on February 3, 2022.

The game takes place in London and its suburbs in 1894 and 1895 with gameplay focused on finding the right culprit and making the moral choice of absolving or condemning them. The game is the first in the series to use the Unreal Engine 3, and was inspired by Arthur Conan Doyle's original stories. The game is split into six cases of murders, disappearances and thefts written in the tradition of Doyle novels. Its title is a play on the title of the Russian novel Crime and Punishment by author Fyodor Dostoyevsky, which Sherlock is frequently seen reading during the game.

== Gameplay ==
Sherlock Holmes is the main playable character with Dr. Watson, Toby (a Basset Hound) and Constable Marrow playable briefly. The majority of the game involves exploring crime scenes and examining clues. Once discovered, clues are added to a "deduction board", a gameplay mechanic which involves linking pieces of information together. It will lead to possible different deductions. Once deductions are connected together, the player will have a full tree of deductions. Depending on how players interpret the clues, they will have different conclusions. Therefore, the player can fail or succeed in finding the culprit. Players also decide whether to absolve or condemn the criminal. The moral choice the player makes will influence the further gameplay. Each case will have 3-5 possible solutions; in total there will be 6-10 different endings for each case. In total, the game offers 14 investigation mechanics, including Sherlock Holmes' skill to deduce many details about someone's life simply by glancing at them or to imagine and reconstruct the course of event by carefully observing all the key details of a crime scene.

There are two camera views available – a first person point of view and a static third person camera. The player is able to change between them at any time. Sherlock can also draw evidence from autopsies and scanning the people he meets. For the latter, players will enter a first-person view for an up-close inspection of a character's face and emotions, clothing and belongings, where he'll find everything from scars and bruises to the quality of an outfit. Frogwares have fully detailed Victorian-era London using the new engine and it can also be explored.

A mechanic called "Sherlock Vision" helps in highlighting evidence that would otherwise be missed. For example, through Sherlock Vision players can look at a dusty bookcase shelves and notice that a chest has been taken from the shelf, or that an item may have a hidden inscription on it. In Crimes and Punishments, text sometimes appears detailing what Holmes is thinking, such as how approaching footsteps sound and who might be at the door.

== Plot ==
Set in the year 1894 and reaching into 1895 during the time of The Testament of Sherlock Holmes, the overarching plot is that a group of terrorists calling themselves the Merry Men are attempting to overthrow the government, and free the people of the United Kingdom from debt. The game features six separate cases, some of which are direct adaptations of original Sherlock Holmes canon by Sir Arthur Conan Doyle. Each case is self-contained and apart from in-game achievements, such as moral choices, do not relate to one another. The cases are as follows:

- The Fate of Black Peter: Holmes is engaged by Inspector Lestrade to investigate the murder of Peter Carey, known as Black Peter, an ill-tempered whaling captain who was found impaled on the wall of his garden cabin with a whaling harpoon. The case is an adaptation of "The Adventure of Black Peter". This specific case likely takes place either during or after the events of Sherlock Holmes versus Jack the Ripper, which largely takes place between September and November 1888, as the murder weapon in this case is displayed on the wall of 221B Baker Street, although Watson refers to the victim in this game as "Peter the Black". He also mentions how an experiment Sherlock wants to conduct is similar to one they conducted on "the Ripper case".
- Riddle on the Rails: Sherlock's brother Mycroft asks him to look into the Merry Men, a band of anarchists plotting an attack on London. Sherlock refuses since he is not interested in politics, and he continues on a trip with Watson to rural Staffordshire. A week later, Holmes and Watson plan to take a train back to London but the train mysteriously vanishes. They investigate the disappearance of the train. This story adapts elements from "The Lost Special".
- Blood Bath: Lestrade tells Holmes about a political incident concerning the Merry Men, but Holmes again refuses to get involved. However, he does agree to investigate the murder of a renowned archaeologist who was found dead in the locked steam room of the Roman Baths in London. Holmes delves into an investigation featuring three suspects and the Cult of Mithras.
- The Abbey Grange Affair: Sir Eustace Brackenstall, an aristocrat of violent temper, has allegedly been murdered by a trio of burglars who also took his wife hostage and stole his silverware. Holmes pursues the culprit or culprits while questioning the veracity of the lady's statement. The story is adapted from "The Adventure of the Abbey Grange".
- The Kew Gardens Drama: An old friend (from The Testament of Sherlock Holmes) asks Holmes to investigate the theft of some exotic plants at the Kew Gardens. The investigation takes a new turn as the Director of the Gardens is revealed to have died a few days before the theft and Holmes suddenly finds himself investigating a possible murder.
- A Half Moon Walk: The older brother of Wiggins, Holmes' chief Baker Street Irregular, has been charged with double murder and Wiggins asks Holmes to clear his brother's name. The case soon begins to have a whole new aspect featuring men who disappear from plain sight.

At the end, Holmes confronts the Merry Men after learning more about their plan during the last case. They attempt to reason with him that their goal is for the benefit of the people. Holmes can choose to allow them to carry out their plan, or to stop them, though he will not take them into custody.

== Development ==
Development of lighting

Crimes and Punishments is developed on Epic Games' Unreal Engine 3, allowing the series to jump far ahead of previous installments in graphical quality. Environments are more realistic and finely detailed with dynamic lighting and shadows. Choosing this engine also lets the game benefit from many technologies like a powerful animation engine for smooth movement and animation transitions, real-time shaders and a particle system, and advanced post-processing effects. Frogwares have scrapped its old method (employing one huge texture), instead opting to use Tiled Textures.

Frogwares tweaked its Sherlock Holmes series to be more modern with the introduction of "Sherlock Vision", a mechanic that will help in highlighting evidence that would otherwise be missed. According to Frogwares' business developer Olga Ryzhko, Sherlock Vision takes the series to the "next level". Ryzhko calls the game the "most challenging, most sophisticated" Sherlock game yet, and said the development team has built on previous games' mechanics while tweaking them slightly for a more modern feel.

Ryzhko said that the "Sherlock Vision" mechanic was inspired by the BBC television series Sherlock, which uses on-screen text to show what Sherlock is thinking, and also described the development team as "very thoughtful and very respectful of the canon of Sherlock Holmes".

Sherlock Holmes was voiced by Kerry Shale, and Dr. Watson was voiced by Nick Brimble.

== Reception ==
Reception

Aggregate score
Aggregator	Score
Metacritic	PC: 77/100; PS4: 73/100; XONE: 71/100; NS: 77/100

Review scores
Publication	Score
Adventure Gamers	4/5
Destructoid	7/10
Eurogamer	7/10
Game Informer	8/10
GameSpot	8/10
IGN	7.5/10
PC Gamer (US)	84/100
Polygon	8/10
Push Square	7/10
The Guardian	3/5
VideoGamer.com	8/10

Sherlock Holmes: Crimes & Punishments was previewed by several major gaming news sources. Jessica Conditt of Joystiq pointed to "the setting, tone, mechanics and graphics in Crimes and Punishments each appear to be updated vastly and in a wonderfully gritty direction compared with previous Sherlock games". VentureBeat's Jasmine Maleficent Rea wrote: "The once gentlemanly adventure-game star is now a deceitful amalgam of Arthur Conan Doyle's original character and the 21st-century interpretation we find on television and in movies. [...] Crimes & Punishments shows us the very manipulative side of Sherlock that modern audiences expect. He remains an amoral character in a world desperately trying to reclaim its morality, and he seems to revel in it". Michael Cromwell of PCGMedia wrote that the game is "a self confessed departure from the prosaic and amoral, with Frogwares pushing for a more hands-on, ethically involved experience – putting you, the player, in the mind of Sherlock Holmes". Chuck Osborn of IGN praised the visuals and gameplay but noted with some disappointment that "final deductions are based largely on a web of circumstantial evidence". Gamercast awarded the game Best Adventure Game at E3 2013. Jeuxvideo.com granted the game Best Adventure Game at E3 2014. In 2021 Andy Kelly of PC Gamer named it as among "the best detective games on PC".

Crimes & Punishments received positive reviews. Aggregating review website Metacritic gave the Microsoft Windows version 77/100 based on 32 reviews, the PlayStation 4 version 73/100 based on 36 reviews, the Xbox One version 71/100 based on 8 reviews, and the Switch version 77/100 based on 5 reviews.

The computer version of Crimes & Punishments alone sold above 300,000 units by the end of 2014, according to Focus Home Interactive.
