= Sherlock Holmes: The Awakened =

2006 video game

- European cover art
- Developer: Frogwares
- Publishers: EU: Frogwares Focus Home Interactive; UK: Ascaron, 93Games; NA: CDV Entertainment
- Designer: Jalil Amr
- Series: Sherlock Holmes
- Platforms: Windows, iOS
- Release: Windows: FRA: November 24, 2006; UK: February 16, 2007; NA: September 11, 2007; Remastered: EU: June 27, 2008; NA: August 6, 2009; iOS: WW: February 3, 2013
- Genre: Adventure
- Mode: Single-player

Sherlock Holmes: The Awakened is an adventure video game developed by Frogwares and published for Windows in 2006. It follows an original plotline as Sherlock Holmes and his companion Dr. John H. Watson investigate a series of strange disappearances related to the Cthulhu Mythos.

The third in the Sherlock Holmes series of adventure games developed by Frogwares, The Awakened was preceded in 2002 by Sherlock Holmes: The Mystery of the Mummy and in 2004 by Sherlock Holmes: The Case of the Silver Earring. This is the first game in the series to tackle supernatural elements such as the Cthulhu Mythos, the previous two games having fairly traditional (albeit original) Holmesian plots. It was also the first to get an M (Mature 17+) rating from the ESRB.

In 2008, a remastered version was released. It offers the ability to play in a third-person perspective mode in addition to the first-person perspective and features improved graphics and changes to the help system. It became available on Steam in August 2009. A full remake of the game was released in April 2023 for Windows, Nintendo Switch, PlayStation 4, PlayStation 5, Xbox One, and Xbox Series X/S.

== Plot ==
On September 6, 1894, Sherlock Holmes stares out of his window, bored that he has no case to solve that is worthy of his talents. He learns that a young Māori manservant, who works for Captain Stenwick, has mysteriously disappeared. Holmes quickly deduces not only that the servant has been kidnapped, but also that two men – one significantly larger than the other – were responsible. A few leads point to the docks by the Thames, and there, Holmes and Watson learn that similar kidnappings of foreigners have occurred. Further investigation leads them to an abandoned subterranean temple, where they discover a bloody and tortured corpse upon a sacrificial altar. They also find opium with morphine which leads Holmes to deduce that it is being used as a kind of soporific to subdue victims, so that they can be abducted and trafficked out of the country. After finding a crate labelled "Black Edelweiss Institute", Holmes recalls that the mountain flower Edelweiss (Leontopodium alpinum) is a national symbol of Switzerland.

Upon arrival it is discovered that the Black Edelweiss Institute is a Swiss mental asylum headed by a gentleman named Dr. Gygax. Holmes and Watson hatch a plan to gain access and investigate. Knowing that he is about to willingly fall into the hands of criminals, Holmes sends Watson away from the asylum. This is primarily for his own safety, but also so that Holmes still has a connection with the outside world should things go awry once inside the institute. Donning a costume and assuming a false identity, Holmes enters and is quickly incarcerated. After escaping from his cell, he finds further proof of Dr. Gygax's involvement in serious criminal activities. Not only has the doctor been performing dangerous experiments on helpless victims in the asylum, he is also part of a cult awaiting the arrival of "the One". The drugs provided were paid for with precious stones in New Orleans. Holmes unexpectedly discovers that his nemesis Moriarty is a patient, though a weakened shadow of his former self having survived the fall at Reichenbach. Using Moriarty as a distraction, Holmes extricates himself from the asylum.

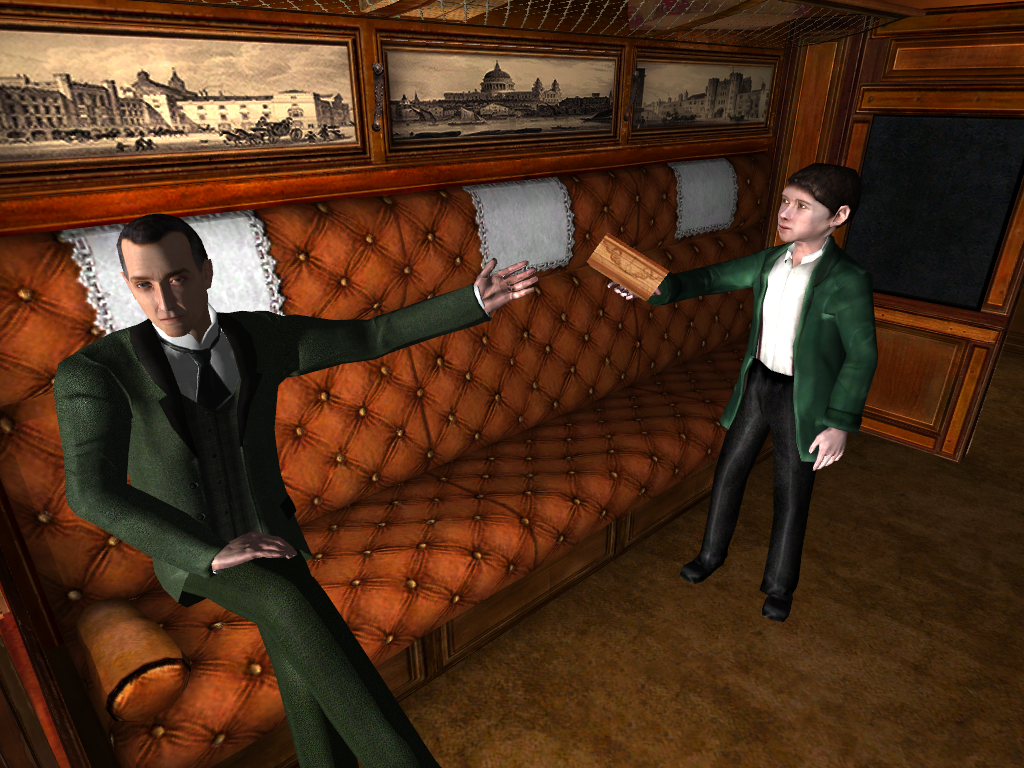
Sherlock Holmes with a young Hercule Poirot

Holmes and Watson travel to New Orleans to intercept the transfer of the stones. They are soon taunted and harassed by the local sheriff who recognises them and appears to have some connection to the cult. They learn that the stones were sold to the bank by the butler of a local man known as Mr. Arneson. Both Arneson and his servant, a young lad named Davy, have been missing for days. They find Davy, who is mute due to psychological trauma. After Watson treats him, Davy writes on a chalkboard a series of numbers, which Watson copies down. Holmes and Watson then rescue Arneson, who was about to be sacrificed by a crazed cult member deep in the swamp, and retrieve an ancient book.

Back in London, Holmes and Watson learn from the book about a mythical sea god who could be awakened by the sacrificing of persons representing the different nations. They also decipher Davy's numbers, which they find are co-ordinates pointing to Ardnamurchan Lighthouse on a Scottish coastline. Once at the lighthouse, Holmes and Watson have a final confrontation with the cultists and their leader Lord Rochester, whose fortune finances the sect. Holmes manages to stop the "summoning", but a fierce storm appears, which Rochester assumes is the coming of Cthulhu. Despite Holmes' attempt to stop him, Rochester jumps to his death into the raging sea below. Upon returning to London, Watson plans to write their adventure into a book, however Holmes tells him to not do it as the knowledge they have witnessed may fall into the wrong hands, which Watson thankfully accepts.

== Gameplay ==
The Awakened is the first Frogwares title to allow gameplay to take place in an entirely real-time 3D landscape and from a first-person perspective, losing the pre-rendered backgrounds of its predecessor. Like other Sherlock Holmes games by Frogwares it gives an open world environment in every location that can hide clues and interact with NPC. The inventory system saves all objects, documents and map locations for later use and can also be used to combine objects. All conversations with characters in the game are completed through linear cut scenes for which the players cannot direct the subjects at any point.

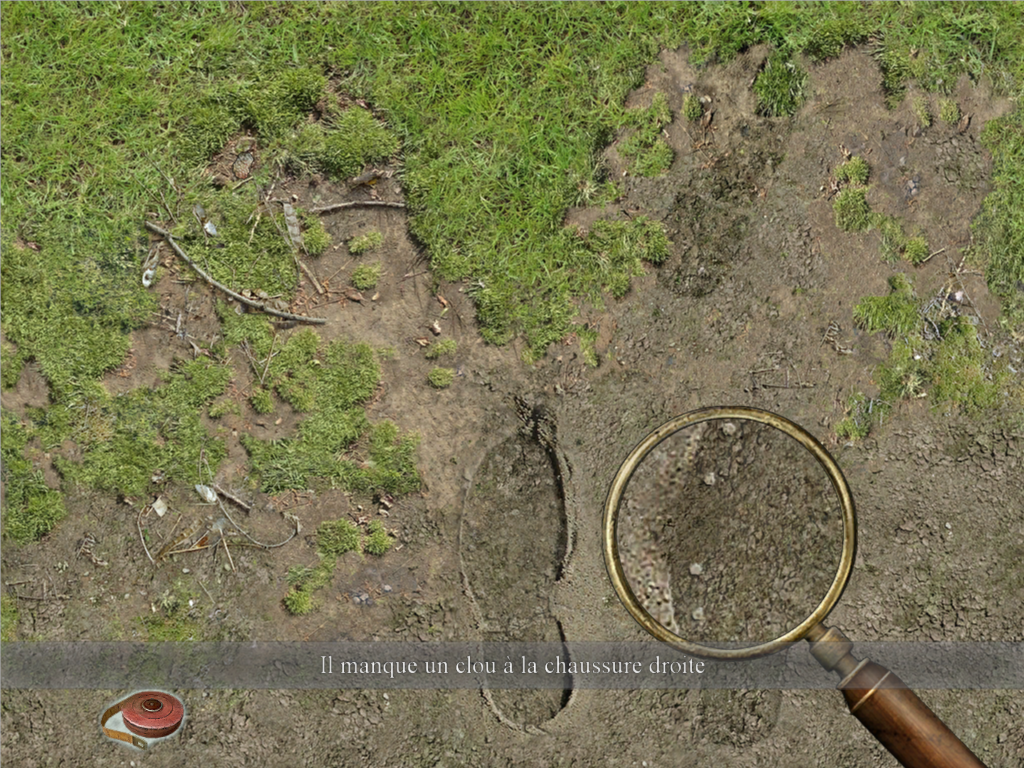
Searching for clues at a crime scene

Some of these conversations are triggered merely by clicking on a character, while others require complete a series of tasks before they will happen on their own. While most of Holmes' conclusions in the game come from gathering random clues found around the crime scenes, the players will have the opportunity to take evidence back to Holmes' famous 221 B Baker Street flat and examine it under a microscope or put it through chemical tests. They will also have puzzles to solve throughout the game like picking combination locks, deciphering cryptic messages and solving a clock puzzle to open a safe.

The game can be viewed from a first- or third-person perspective and it provides with an icon to indicate what actions Holmes can take within his world like pick up or talk. Holmes can move around via the mouse or the keyboard and his movement is completely free within the 3D space. While the game does give a fair amount of space to move around in each area, there are cases where Holmes must move to a new area screen or change his view of the street in order to move where the players want him to, but in those cases, an icon will show a set of footprints to indicate the change.

Although the game had adopted a view popularized by the first-person shooter genre, it retains the point-and-click aspect of most adventure games, giving the player the ability to complete the game using the mouse alone.

== Reception ==
Reception

Aggregate scores
Aggregator	Score
GameRankings	71.32% (31 reviews)
Metacritic	72% (23 reviews)

Review scores
Publication	Score
Eurogamer	6/10
GameSpot	8.3 of 10
IGN	8.1 of 10
Digitally Downloaded	3.5/5 (iPad)

The game received "generally mixed or average" reviews, according to review aggregator Metacritic, receiving a score of 72 out of 100 from a total of 28 critics. The first four Sherlock Holmes titles from Frogwares—Mummy, Silver Earring, The Awakened and Nemesis—totaled roughly 1.5 million global sales by February 2009.

GameSpot praised the game's engaging story, puzzles, and visuals while panning its unskippable cutscenes.

=== Awards ===
The game earned GameSpot's "Best Use of a License" award in 2007. It was also nominated for GameSpot's and IGN's "Best PC Adventure Game of 2007" awards.

In 2011, Adventure Gamers named The Awakened the 80th-best adventure game ever released.

== Remake ==
A full remake of the game featuring a substantially rewritten script was developed by Frogwares and released for Microsoft Windows, Nintendo Switch, PlayStation 4, PlayStation 5, Xbox One and Xbox Series X/S in April 2023.

== See also ==
- All-Consuming Fire
- Shadows Over Baker Street
- Still Life 2
