= A Study in Emerald =

2003 short story by Neil Gaiman

- Short story by Neil Gaiman
- Country: United States
- Language: English
- Genres: Mystery, horror, crossover, fan fiction short story

Publication
- Published in: Shadows Over Baker Street (2003); Fragile Things (2006)
- Media type: Print (hardback and paperback)
- Publication date: 2003

"A Study in Emerald" is a short story written by British fantasy and graphic novel author Neil Gaiman. The story is a Sherlock Holmes pastiche transferred to the Cthulhu Mythos universe of horror writer H. P. Lovecraft. Gaiman describes it as "Lovecraft/Holmes fan fiction". It won the 2004 Hugo Award for Best Short Story. The title is a reference to the Sherlock Holmes novel A Study in Scarlet.

"A Study in Emerald" first appeared in the anthology Shadows Over Baker Street, a collection of stories combining the worlds of Arthur Conan Doyle and H. P. Lovecraft; it has subsequently been available as part of Gaiman's short story collection Fragile Things, in the collection New Cthulhu: The Recent Weird, and is available online. The online version takes the form of a Victorian periodical or newspaper, which includes various advertisements that reference characters such as Vlad Tepes, Victor Frankenstein, Spring Heeled Jack, and Dr. Jekyll.

In the introduction to Fragile Things, Gaiman cites Philip José Farmer's Wold Newton Universe, Kim Newman's Anno Dracula series (which Gaiman helped create), and Alan Moore's The League of Extraordinary Gentlemen as being the major influences of "A Study in Emerald".

When Gaiman was asked if he had any plans to make a follow-up set in the world of the story, he said: "I hope so. I know the title and the protagonist of the next story in it".

== Plot ==
The unnamed narrator, a veteran of a bloody war against the "gods and men of Afghanistan", whose arm has been gravely injured by torture, is seeking lodgings upon his return to "Albion". He becomes the roommate of a man of extraordinary deductive skills who puts them to use as a 'consulting detective'. Early in their acquaintance, Inspector Lestrade of Scotland Yard arrives at their lodgings in Baker Street, hoping to hire the narrator's roommate to solve "a matter of national importance". The roommate and the narrator investigate the murder scene, where the detective correctly deduces that the victim is of German royal blood, having an inhuman number of limbs. Lestrade confirms his identity: a guest and nephew of the Queen of Albion. They puzzle over the word Rache scrawled onto the wall in the victim's blood. After leaving the scene, they are taken to the Palace. The Queen, one of the Great Old Ones who defeated humanity 700 years ago and now rule the world, consults with them about the affair. As payment for his services, the Queen heals the veteran's withered shoulder with a touch.

The investigation takes the detective and the veteran to a music hall show, starring a noted actor called Sherry Vernet. A "tall, languid" man, Vernet stars in three productions, including a historical narrative depicting the war between humanity and the Great Old Ones. Posing as a theatrical agent offering to take the show to the New World, the detective meets Vernet and determines that he and another, a man with a limp and skill with surgical equipment, were present in the room where the German noble died. Agreeing to meet the detective in his rooms, Vernet seemingly does not suspect a thing; the detective promptly summons Lestrade, intending to have Vernet arrested. He reveals what he has deduced: that Vernet is a seditionary "Restorationist", an anarchist who believes that the Great Old Ones are not the benevolent rulers that they claim to be, but vicious, soul-destroying monsters from whom humanity must be freed. Vernet lured the German noble to the Whitechapel rooms and turned the noble over to his accomplice, who committed the actual murder.

When the detective and his allies spring their trap, they find that their quarry has eluded them, leaving behind only a letter that confirms the detective's suspicions; Vernet also possesses considerable deductive abilities and has deduced that the detective was not who he claimed to be. Vernet reveals that he had briefly corresponded with the detective posing as a man named "Sigerson", offers suggestions for future undercover work and compliments several papers that the detective had written, including "The Dynamics of an Asteroid". Vernet, who also uses the alias "Rache", also details horrors that he has witnessed being committed by the Great Old Ones as justification for the crime. As Lestrade rushes off to search for Vernet and the limping accomplice (tentatively identified as a former military surgeon named John (or maybe James) Watson), the detective admits that it is unlikely that Vernet has left the city, having probably elected to hide in the lawless depths of the rookery of St. Giles until the search is abandoned. He requests that the veteran burn Vernet's letter, dismissing it as "seditionary nonsense". The veteran does not do so, instead adding a copy of the letter and an account of the investigation to his bank deposit box, not to be opened until everyone involved in the case is dead. He supposes that, due to undisclosed current events in Russia, this will likely be an imminent occurrence.

The story is signed "S_________ M______, Major (Ret'd)".

== Overview ==
The reader, from the beginning of the story, is misled to believe that the detective and his veteran friend, the narrator, are Sherlock Holmes and Dr. Watson, by means of what information about them is provided and what concealed, and the fact that their roles in the story are parallel to those of Holmes and Watson in Conan Doyle's original Holmes stories. Indeed, the story strongly mirrors the opening chapters of the original Holmes novel, A Study in Scarlet, from which it takes its name.

Whilst almost none of the characters are explicitly identified in the text, it is strongly hinted by the twist ending that Vernet/'Rache' is Holmes, and the detective and his veteran friend are Professor James Moriarty and Colonel Sebastian Moran (who, in Doyle's original stories, are the criminal mastermind enemy of Sherlock Holmes and his right-hand man and accomplice, respectively). The 'Limping Doctor', meanwhile, is identified explicitly as "John (or perhaps James) Watson".

In particular:

- The 'detective' character has written a paper on 'The Dynamics of an Asteroid', which "Rache" comments on. In the Conan Doyle books, Moriarty is the author of this paper.
- The narrator signs his name at the end of his story. Although the name is obscured, he possesses the initials 'S.M.', indicating that he is Sebastian Moran.
- The narrator, when introduced to Vernet, is called Sebastian.
- The 'detective' character is described to have a 'thin smile', a physical characteristic Doyle repeatedly used to describe villainous characters in his stories.
- The narrator repeatedly mentions what a crack-shot he was before being wounded. In "The Adventure of the Empty House", Moran is described as an expert marksman.
- Conan Doyle's drafts show he originally intended to call Sherlock Holmes "Sherrinford" (which some Sherlockians consider was actually the name of Sherlock's oldest brother). Holmes' grandmother was a relative of the French artist Vernet. "Sherry Vernet" is therefore an obvious stage name for Sherlock Holmes.
- In this story, Sherlock is a gifted actor. In the story "A Scandal in Bohemia", Sherlock is said to be a master of disguise. In the same story Watson laments on how "the stage lost a fine actor, even as science lost an acute reasoner, when he became a specialist in crime".
- Similarly to the above, the "Limping Doctor" is revealed by "Rache" to possess creative writing skills on top of his medical abilities and writes the plays performed by the theatrical troupe. Watson was the narrator of almost all of the Conan Doyle stories, which were presented as his published accounts of the investigations.
- "Sigerson" is an alias used by Sherlock Holmes during the period when he is believed to be dead after he escapes Moriarty.

Conan Doyle's Sherlock Holmes is extremely selective about which fields of science he studies, with deep – indeed peerless – insight into matters such as chemistry, botanical poisons, and the soil types encountered in various parts of London, but a studied ignorance about matters less relevant to crime-solving such as basic astronomy. The Holmes of this story, however, has chosen to pursue researches in advanced theoretical physics. The detective reveals to the narrator that his correspondence with "Rache" involved the latter's "wild theories" concerning "the relationship between mass, energy and the hypothetical speed of light", which he calls "nonsense, of course...but inspired and dangerous nonsense nonetheless".

While not explicitly stated at the conclusion of the story, based on the date that accompanies the "signature", the recent events in Russia most likely refer to the assassination of Tsar Alexander II in 1881, i.e. an assassination of a Great Old One of extreme importance.

== Adaptations ==
British game designer Martin Wallace created a boardgame based on "A Study in Emerald", that was released in October 2013. A second edition with new art and streamlined rules was released in 2015.

In June 2018, Dark Horse Comics published a graphic novel adaptation of the short story by Rafael Scavone, Rafael Albuquerque and Dave Stewart.

== Awards ==
"A Study in Emerald" won the 2004 Hugo Award for Best Short Story, and the 2004 Locus Award for Best Novelette. It was nominated for the 2006 Seiun Award for Translated Short Form.

== See also ==
- All-Consuming Fire
