= Acclaim =

Acclaim may refer to:

- Acclamation, a form of election that does not use a ballot

== Companies ==
- Acclaim Comics, a bankrupt publisher of comic books restarted under Valiant Entertainment
- Acclaim Entertainment, a defunct American video game developer and publisher
- Acclaim Games, an American online video game company
- Acclaim Studios, an organization of Acclaim-owned game development studios
  - Acclaim Studios Austin, an Austin, Texas-based video game company
  - Acclaim Studios Manchester, a British video game company

== Transportation ==
- Commodore Acclaim, an Australian model of automobile produced between 1993 and 1995
- Mooney M20TN Acclaim, a personal use civil aircraft
- Plymouth Acclaim, a mid-size sedan (1989–1995)
- Triumph Acclaim, a front wheel drive medium-sized family car (1981–1984)
