= How to Talk to Girls at Parties =

- Short story by Neil Gaiman
- Country: United States
- Language: English
- Genres: Science fiction, humor

Publication
- Published in: Fragile Things
- Publication type: Book
- Publication date: 2006

"How to Talk to Girls at Parties" is a science fiction short story written in 2006 by Neil Gaiman.

It is about a couple of British 1970s teenaged boys, Enn and Vic, who go to a party to meet girls, only to find that the girls are very different from the boys' expectations.

"How to Talk to Girls at Parties" was nominated for the 2007 Hugo Award for Best Short Story and won the Locus Award for Best Short Story in 2007. In 2009, it was the inspiration for a limited-edition poster with art by Camilla d'Errico, which was sold through Gaiman's merchandising site Neverwear. The poster had a limited run of 1200 copies, hand-numbered, and 10% of the proceeds were donated to the Comic Book Legal Defense Fund, a favourite charity of Gaiman's. Gaiman published a graphic novelization of the story in 2016, with art by Fábio Moon and Gabriel Bá, and a film adaptation would ultimately premiere the following year at the Cannes Film Festival and widely release in May 2018 to split response from critics.

== Plot ==
The story is about a shy boy named Enn who attends a party with his wild friend Vic. Enn narrates from thirty years later.

Enn and Vic get to a party where they are greeted by a girl named Stella who Vic immediately begins flirting with. Vic pushes Enn to just talk to any girl at the party. The first girl, who identifies herself as Wain's Wain, claims to be "a second" due to a minor deformity on her pinky finger. Wain's Wain shows no interest in doing much due to not being "permitted" and tells a very unusual story about being in Rio de Janeiro at Carnival. Enn leaves to get some water for her, but when he comes back Wain's Wain is gone.

Enn meets a second girl with black spiky hair and a gap between her teeth who claims to be a "tourist" and elaborates on traveling to other places, most notably the Sun. Enn actually tries to get close with the gap-toothed girl, but is interrupted by Vic who reveals that they are at the wrong party. He nevertheless takes Stella upstairs, presumably to have sex.

Enn goes into the kitchen where he meets the third girl, named Triolet. Triolet claims that her name is a form of poem and kisses Enn. She then whispers a "poem" into Enn's ear in a language that Enn is unable to identify, but it puts him in a trance.

A very angry and hectic Vic suddenly pulls Enn away. Enn reveals that he saw Stella staring down from the balcony with an expression that Enn can only describe as being that of an "angry universe". What Vic saw is never revealed, but it was enough to make him throw up and cry. The story ends with Enn admitting that try as he might he could not properly remember the poem whispered to him and would never be able to repeat it.

== Graphic novel ==
A graphic novel adaptation by Neil Gaiman, Fábio Moon and Gabriel Bá was published in 2016 by Dark Horse Comics.

== Film ==
A feature film adaptation by See-Saw Films was produced by Howard Gertler alongside Iain Canning and Emile Sherman. John Cameron Mitchell was chosen as director, from a script he cowrote with Philippa Goslett. Elle Fanning and Alex Sharp took the lead roles, Nicole Kidman, Ruth Wilson and Matt Lucas also starring in the project. The film premiered at the 2017 Cannes Film Festival, and was more widely released in May 2018. Critic consensus indicated "mixed or average reviews" with Rotten Tomato's summary reading that it "has energy and ambition, but is ultimately too unfocused to do much with either".
