= Pearl's Peril =

2013 video game

Pearl’s Peril
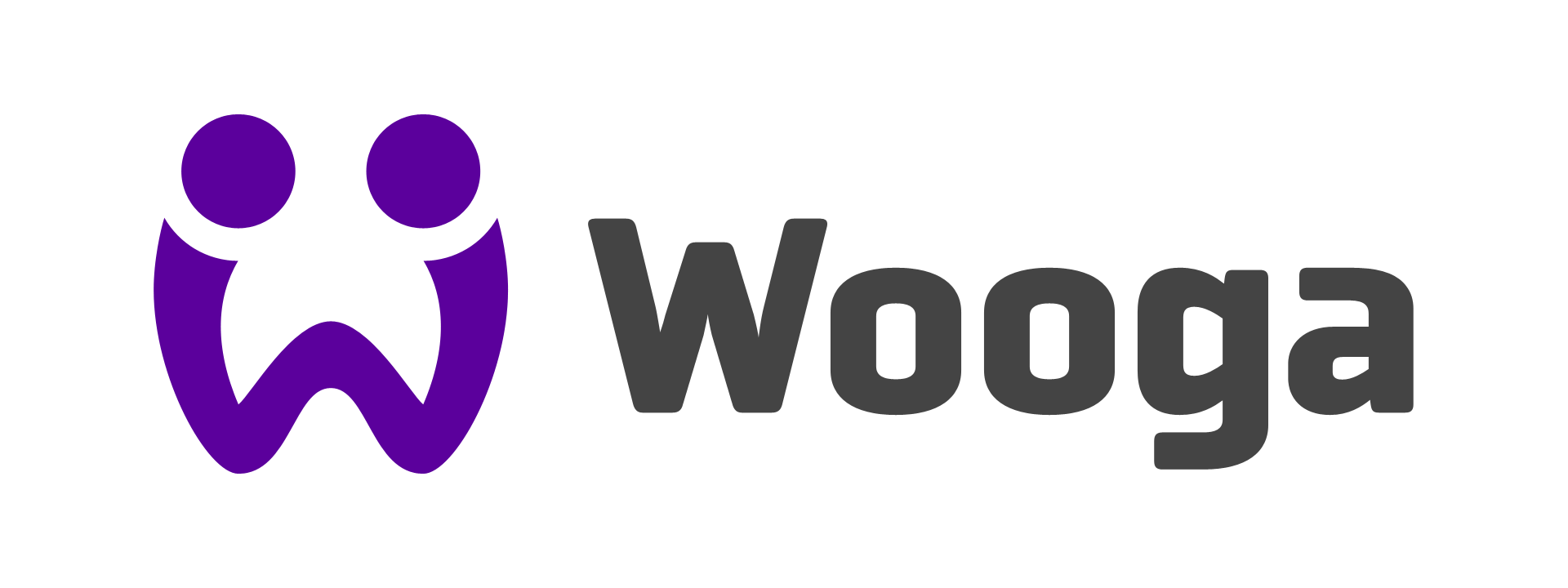
- Developer: Wooga
- Platforms: Facebook (WebGL), iOS, Android
- Release: Facebook: March 2013 iPhone/iPad: September 2013
- Genre: Hidden Object

Pearl’s Peril is a hidden object game developed by Berlin-based Wooga. It was launched on 5 March 2013 on the Facebook social media platform and on 5 September on iPad. Pearl’s Peril is Wooga’s sixth game, and was the company’s fastest growing game at the time. Wooga also released a soundtrack to the game.

== Gameplay ==
Pearl’s Peril is a hidden object (sometimes known as hidden picture) game. Players are given a list of items to find within a static scene. They then receive points for each item found, and score multipliers for completing the task quickly. Players can also use a hint feature to highlight items that they find difficult to see. In between many of the levels, puzzle levels require players to find and assemble specific items linked closely to the story.

Pearl’s Peril also has an isometric building metagame, in which players must construct buildings on an island. Some items offer rewards, such as ‘prestige’, which is used to unlock further chapters in the game. Players must also expand their island by exploring, which requires three in-game currencies, namely coins, cash and compasses.

The story was created by Steven-Elliot Altman, the former games director at Acclaim Games, and later continued by veteran game writer Will Hiles (NCsoft), and Johanna Fischer. New chapters of the story are written every week.

== Narrative ==
Pearl’s Peril is set in the 1930s, and opens with the titular adventurer, Pearl Wallace, receiving news of her father Samuel's suicide. Shocked, she goes back to Artemis Island, her childhood home and home of all the Wallace clan, with her friend Iris Hillman by her side; Pearl cannot believe her father committed suicide. Her suspicions turn out to be true when her grandfather Edwin Wallace, who was believed to have died several years ago, shows up during Samuel's funeral feast proclaiming one of the attendants killed Samuel and he is going to find out who did it. Pearl joins in her grandfather's efforts and soon finds out that a mysterious society named the Chaos Veil was behind Samuel's death, and that the family friend and groundskeeper of Artemis, Léon, is involved with the Chaos Veil. Pearl swears to avenge her father's death and bring the killer to justice. Pearl starts a path full of adventures, deceit... and peril.

== Monetization ==
Pearl’s Peril is a free-to-play game, using the freemium model of monetization. Players can use real-life money to buy in-game coins and cash. These can then be used to buy extra energy, which is required to play the scenes, and decorations, which are required to unlock new scenes.

== Popularity ==
One month after release, Pearl’s Peril became one of the fastest growing Facebook Games, as measured by daily active users. It reached 1 million DAU within 24 days.

Wooga has released a sequel called June's Journey.

== Reception ==
Reviews for Pearl’s Peril are generally mixed, with many reviewers praising its high production values, and disapproving of its freemium monetization structure.
