= A Treatise on the Binomial Theorem =

Fictional book mentioned in stories of Sherlock Holmes

A Treatise on the Binomial Theorem is a fictional work of mathematics by the young Professor James Moriarty, the criminal mastermind and archenemy of the detective Sherlock Holmes in the fiction of Arthur Conan Doyle. The actual title of the treatise is never given in the stories; Holmes simply refers to "a treatise upon the Binomial Theorem". The treatise is mentioned in the 1893 short story "The Final Problem", when Holmes, speaking of Professor Moriarty, states:

He is a man of good birth and excellent education, endowed by nature with a phenomenal mathematical faculty. At the age of twenty-one he wrote a treatise upon the Binomial Theorem, which has had a European vogue. On the strength of it he won the Mathematical Chair at one of our smaller universities, and had, to all appearances, a most brilliant career before him.

— Sherlock Holmes, "The Final Problem"

Moriarty was a versatile mathematician as well as a criminal mastermind. In addition to the Treatise, he wrote the book The Dynamics of an Asteroid, containing mathematics so esoteric that no one could even review it. This is a very different branch of mathematics from the Binomial Theorem, further reflecting Moriarty's impressive intellectual prowess.

== Review and discussion ==
Doyle, in his works, never describes the contents of the treatise. This has not stopped people from speculating on what it might have contained. Mathematician Harold Davis, in the book The Summation of Series, attributes certain binomial identities to Moriarty. These have been expanded on in further work, tying the Treatise into the standard mathematical literature. Less formal depictions of the content are also available. For example, in 1955 science fiction writer Poul Anderson wrote about the treatise for The Baker Street Journal.

The Treatise is sometimes used when a reference is needed to a non-specific example of a scientific paper.

In cryptography papers, the users and attackers of a cryptosystem are often given names suggestive of their roles. "Eve", for example, is most often the eavesdropper, listening in on an exchange. Malicious attackers are typically "Mallory", but in some cryptographic papers, the malicious attacker is "Moriarty". However, there are real academics named Moriarty, so to avoid confusion one paper distinguished the hypothetical attacker as "the author of A Treatise on the Binomial Theorem".

== Other references ==
In The Seven-Per-Cent Solution, a 1974 Holmes pastiche by Nicholas Meyer, Moriarty in conversation with Watson denies having written any treatise on the binomial theorem, saying: "Certainly not. Who has anything new to say about the binomial theorem at this late date? At any rate, I am certainly not the man to know." In this novel, Moriarty is no evil genius, but a harmless maths teacher who became a monster in Holmes' fantasies because he was involved in certain traumatic childhood experiences of his.

== See also ==
- The Dynamics of an Asteroid, another fictional work by Moriarty
