= Fragile Things =

2006 collection of short stories and poetry by Neil Gaiman

Fragile Things: Short Fictions and Wonders
- First edition (US)
- Author: Neil Gaiman
- Language: English
- Genre: Fantasy
- Publisher: William Morrow
- Publication date: 2006
- Publication place: US, UK
- Media type: Print (hardcover)
- Pages: 400 pages
- ISBN: 0-06-051522-8
- OCLC: 69241597
- Dewey Decimal: 823/.914 22
- LC Class: PR6057.A319 F73 2006

Fragile Things: Short Fictions and Wonders is a collection of short stories and poetry by English author Neil Gaiman. It was published in the US and UK in 2006 by HarperCollins and Headline Review.

Most of the stories in this book are reprints from other sources: magazines, anthologies, and even CD sleeves.

Gaiman says in the introduction that the original title for the collection was These People Ought to Know Who We Are and Tell That We Were Here, after a word balloon in a Little Nemo in Slumberland strip. This exact line also appears in the text for the included short story "Bitter Grounds".

== Contents ==
- "The Mapmaker" – a very short story included in the book's introduction, originally written for American Gods
- "A Study in Emerald" – a Sherlock Holmes/Cthulhu Mythos pastiche written for the anthology Shadows Over Baker Street
- "The Fairy Reel" – a short lyric poem
- "October in the Chair" – dry run for The Graveyard Book, inspired by the work of Ray Bradbury
- "The Hidden Chamber" – gothic poem about Bluebeard for the anthology Outsiders
- "Forbidden Brides of the Faceless Slaves in the Secret House of the Night of Dread Desire" – gothic story published in the anthology Gothic!
- "The Flints of Memory Lane" – a real life ghost story
- "Closing Time" – a club story / ghost story inspired by M. R. James and Robert Aickman
- "Going Wodwo" – a poem about a wild man in the woods for the anthology The Green Man
- "Bitter Grounds" – written for the anthology Mojo: Conjure Stories
- "Other People" – originally titled Afterlife
- "Keepsakes and Treasures: A Love Story" – began as a comic for Oscar Zarate's collection, It's Dark in London illustrated by Warren Pleece. Contains the characters Mr. Alice and Mr. Smith, a pair of dubious men who also appeared in a Gaiman novella called The Monarch of the Glen, suggesting that this tale is a part of the American Gods universe as well.
- "Good Boys Deserve Favors" – inspired by a statue by Lisa Snellings-Clark of a man holding a double bass
- "The Facts in the Case of the Departure of Miss Finch" – inspired by a painting by Frank Frazetta of a savage woman flanked by tigers. Not present in the British paperback from Headline Review.
- "Strange Little Girls" – twelve very short stories to accompany Tori Amos's CD Strange Little Girls
- "Harlequin Valentine" – written for Strange Attraction, a book based on a Ferris wheel made by Lisa Snellings-Clark
- "Locks" – a conversational poem editing the tale of Goldilocks
- "The Problem of Susan" – written for the anthology Flights by Al Sarrantonio, written in response to the character Susan in Narnia
- "Instructions" – a poem giving instructions about what to do when you find yourself in a fairy tale, later republished as a picture book
- "How Do You Think It Feels?" – story inspired by gargoyles, in this case protecting the heart. Not present in the British paperback from Headline Review
- "My Life" – a monologue written to accompany a picture of a sock monkey in the photography book Sock Monkeys by Arne Svenson
- "Fifteen Painted Cards from a Vampire Tarot" – not present in the British paperback from Headline Review
- "Feeders and Eaters" – based on a nightmare of Neil Gaiman's, it first took the form of a comic and later the outline for a pornographic horror film
- "Diseasemaker's Croup" – written for the book The Thackery T. Lambshead Pocket Guide to Eccentric and Discredited Diseases edited by Jeff VanderMeer and Mark Roberts
- "In the End" – imagined as the last book of the Bible. Not present in the British paperback from Headline Review.
- "Goliath" – set in the Matrix universe and included with The Matrix Comics Vol. 1
- "Pages from a Journal Found in a Shoebox Left in a Greyhound Bus Somewhere Between Tulsa, Oklahoma, and Louisville, Kentucky" – written for the album Scarlet's Walk, by Tori Amos
- "How to Talk to Girls at Parties" – nominated for the 2007 Hugo Award for Best Short Story and won the Locus Award for Best Short Story
- "The Day the Saucers Came" - short narrative poem about the end of the world
- "Sunbird" – written as a birthday present for Neil Gaiman's daughter, a story in the style of R. A. Lafferty
- "Inventing Aladdin" – a poem depicting the invention of stories, in this case, Aladdin
- The Monarch of the Glen – a novella-length sequel to Gaiman's novel American Gods inspired by Beowulf and set in remote areas of Scotland

The four stories not included in the British edition are included in the British edition of Smoke and Mirrors.

== Awards ==
Fragile Things won the 2007 Locus Award for Best Collection, and "How to Talk to Girls at Parties" won for Best Short Story and was nominated for a Hugo Award. Other Locus Award winners included in this collection are "Sunbird" (2006 short story), "Forbidden Brides of the Faceless Slaves in the Nameless House of the Night of Dread Desire" (2005 short story), "A Study in Emerald" (2004 novelette, and also winner of the 2004 Hugo Award for Best Short Story), "Closing Time" (2004 short story), and "October in the Chair" (2003 short story).
