= Steven-Elliot Altman =

American writer

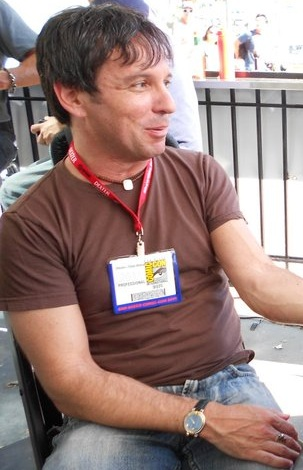
- Altman at San Diego Comicon 2011
- Born: Long Beach, New York, U.S.
- Occupations: Novelist, game writer / director and C.E.O
- Writing career
- Genres: Science fiction, horror, technology
- Notable works: Deprivers (ACE), Shadows Over Baker Street, 9Dragons, Zen in the Art of Slaying Vampires, Batman: Fear Itself"
- Website: socialimpulse.com

Steven-Elliot Altman is an American author, graphic novelist, video game writer-director, producer, screenwriter and the current chief executive officer of a software company called Social Impulse that services the videogame industry.

== Career ==
Altman was hired to join Acclaim Games in 2005 by former Activision co-founder and Chairman Howard Marks, and mentored in social game metrics by David Perry initially as the writer for the game 9Dragons and later as Game Director/Director of Marketing. Marks eventually gave Altman full directorial control of Acclaim's download division.

In May 2010, Acclaim was purchased by Playdom, which in turn was acquired by Disney. Altman was offered the opportunity to come on board with Playdom, but declined in lieu of the offer to become an advisory board member of a software company called Manumatix and eventually found Socialtype LLC. Altman served as the vice-chairman elect of the steering committee of the Videogame Division of the Writers Guild of America since 2008 and served as a Finalist Judge for their Video Game Awards from 2009 to 2019. In 2013, Altman wrote and narrative designed the popular Facebook/IOS story-driven Hidden Object game Pearl's Peril for Berlin-based Wooga, currently the fifth biggest video game producer.

Altman served as a producer for A&E Networks and the History Channel to oversee the videogame versions of two of their hit television series: Ancient Aliens and Project Blue Book: Hidden Mysteries. He also penned the game Terminator: Dark Fate based on the latest feature film in the Terminator franchise.

Altman's novels include Captain America is Dead, Zen in the Art of Slaying Vampires, Batman: Fear Itself, The Killswitch Review, The Irregulars and Deprivers. His writing has inspired illustrations and cover art from artists such as Edward Gorey, John Jude Palencar and Ben Templesmith.

== Honors and awards ==
- Bestseller List for Deprivers (Novel) - Author
- Active member of the Writers Guild of America
- Active member of the Writers Guild of Canada
- Active member of the Science Fiction and Fantasy Writers of America
- Active member of the Horror Writers Association
- MMOsite Reader's Choice Awards for 9Dragons - Best Storyline, Best New Game, Best PVP
- Centers for Disease Control and Prevention Game On! Mobile Application Video Game Challenge - Finalist Judge (2014)
- Nominated for a Develop Award for Pearl's Peril - Best Use of Narrative in a Game (2014)

== Works ==
=== Novels ===
- Captain America is dead. (1992) (Jabberwocky Press)
- Zen in the art of Slaying Vampires (1994) (Hell's Kitchen Books)
- The Touch: Epidemic of the Millennium (an anthology) (2000)(Simon & Schuster)
- Deprivers (2003) (Bestseller) (Ace/Penguin Putnam)
- Fear Itself (Batman novel) (with Michael Reaves) (2007) (DC Comics / Del Rey)
- Infinite Mirror (Batman novel) (with Michael Reaves) (2007) (DC Comics / Del Rey)
- The Killswitch Review (with Diane Dekelb-Rittenhouse) (2009) (Yard Dog Press) (2011–2012) (Serialized on SuicideGirls.com)
- Severed Wings (2020) (WordFire Press)
- Zen in the art of Slaying Vampires (Foreword by Nancy Holder. Anniversary Edition with additional material)(2022) (Wordfire Press)
- Deprivers (2023) (Foreword by Paul Di Filippo. Anniversary Edition with additional material)(Bestseller) (Wordfire Press)

=== Video games ===
- 9Dragons Online (Published 2007) (Massively Multiple Online Roleplaying Game) (Written By / Game Director)(Acclaim Games)
- 2Moons (Published 2008) (Massively Multiple Online Roleplaying Game) (Game Director) (Acclaim Games)
- Mafia Payoff (Published 2009) (Facebook Game) (Written By) (Acclaim Games)
- My Diva Doll (Published 2009) (PC Game) (Executive Oversight) (Acclaim Games)
- Ponystars (Published 2009) (PC Game) (Executive Oversight) (Acclaim Games)
- Tribal Nations (Published 2009) (PC Game) (Executive Oversight) (Acclaim Games)
- RockFREE (Published 2010) (Facebook Game) (Executive Oversight) (Acclaim Games)
- Prize Potato (Published 2010) (Facebook Game) (Executive Oversight) (Acclaim Games)
- Entropia Universe (Published 2012) (massively multiplayer online virtual universe) (Affiliate Program Designer) (MindArk)
- Pearl's Peril (Published 2013) (Episodic Hidden Object Adventure Game, Facebook, iPhone and iPad) (Written By / Narrative Designer) (Wooga)
- Phrazzle (Published 2013) (Puzzle Game, Facebook, iPhone and iPad) (Producer) (GameFly)
- Ancient Aliens (Published 2016) (Facebook, Android, iPhone, iPad) (Producer / Written By / Narrative Designer) (The History Channel / 5th Column Games)
- Terminator: Dark Fate (Published 2019) (Android, Tablet, iPhone, iPad) (Game Story By) (Firefly Games / Skydance Media)
- Project Blue Book (Published 2020) (Android, Tablet, iPhone, iPad) (Producer / Written By / Narrative Designer) (The History Channel / Three Gates)

=== Graphic novels ===
- The Irregulars (with Michael Reaves) (2005) (Dark Horse)
- Catholic Schoolgirls of the Apocalypse (with Tricia Riley Hale)

=== Short stories ===
- "A Blind Virgin Like A Loaded Gun" (2000) (From the anthology The Touch, Simon & Schuster)
- "A Case of Royal Blood" (2003) (From the Hugo Award Winning anthology Shadows Over Baker Street, Del Rey Books)
- "Even a Broken Clock" (2004) (From the anthology Blondes In Trouble, Intrigue Press)
- "Suffer Not a Witch to Live in Kansas" (2011) (From the anthology I Should Have Stayed in Oz, Yard Dog Press)
- "The World of the Wars" (2023) (From the anthology Yay! They're Here!, Dead Fish Books)
- "Schicksal (The German Word for Destiny)" (2023) (From the anthology The One Percent: Tales of the Super Wealthy and Depraved, Rock and a Hard Place Press)
- "Canera Aeterna" (2024) (From the anthology Future Weird: Science Fiction with a touch of Strange, Hippocampus Press)

=== Screenplays ===
- Deprivers
  - Director: Andy Wolk
  - Production Co: Mandalay Pictures
  - Studio: Columbia TriStar
- Zen in the Art of Slaying Vampires
  - Director: Russell Mulcahy
  - Production Co: Capitol Films and Unity Films
