= Jelly Splash =

2013 video game

- Developer: Wooga
- Publisher: Wooga
- Platforms: Facebook (Adobe Flash), iOS, Android
- Release: Facebook: Sept 2013 iPhone/iPad: August 2013; Android: October 2013; KakaoTalk: November 2013
- Genre: Puzzle

Jelly Splash is a match-three puzzle video game released by the developer Wooga on August 15, 2013 on iPad and iPhone. It was later released on Facebook and Android, as well as the Korean social network platform KakaoTalk in November 2013.

== Gameplay ==
Jelly Splash's gameplay involves connecting lines of colored jellies to accrue as many points as the current level requires. There are five different colored jellies in total, namely yellow, red, blue, green and mauve. It is an expansion of games such as Dots, with a level-based progression similar to Candy Crush Saga. Jellies can be linked horizontally, vertically or diagonally, and special bonuses are rewarded for connecting longer lines. Instead of a time limit, there is a move limit for each level. There are a total of over 3,000 levels available in the iOS version.

At the start of each level players begin with a board of colored, anthropomorphic jellies which can be connected via a touchscreen or mouse interface to create strings of the same colored jellies. Many of the levels include obstacles in the form of slime or mushrooms that must be removed to complete the level. If players link seven or more jellies, a superjelly is created, which can later be used to clear vertical or horizontal lines on the board.
The creator of Jelly Splash, Florian Steinhoff, gave some insights into the gameplay and the mechanics of the game at the Game Developers Conference (GDC) 2014.
The game's developers, also say that the game "...is actually little more sophisticated than a slot machine," citing this aspect as being integral to the game's success.

== Monetization ==
Jelly Splash includes in-app purchases, which range from $1.99 to $99 via iTunes on the iOS platform. Players can buy coins, which can be converted into boosts, additional moves or extra lives. Alternatively, lives are replenished over time, or can be requested from Facebook friends.

== Popularity ==
Jelly Splash received over 1 million downloads on iOS platforms within a week of its launch. The Korean version launched on KakaoTalk on November 8, 2013 and reached #11 on November 13, 2013. It reached the number 1 spot in the free charts in nine countries around the world, including the United States – a first for Wooga and only the second German developer to achieve that. After eight weeks the game had 10 million downloads on iOS.

== Reception ==
As of March 2014, Metacritic gives Jelly Splash a score of 63/100, indicating that it has mostly mixed or average reviews. In December 2013, Jelly Splash was voted one of the Best New Facebook Games of 2013 by Facebook, as determined by user ratings, Facebook implementation, growth and overall quality.
