= The Chronicles of Spellborn =

2008 video game

- Developer: Spellborn International
- Publishers: Frogster Interactive; Mindscape; Acclaim Games
- Composer: Jesper Kyd
- Engine: Unreal Engine 2
- Platform: Windows
- Release: EU: November 27, 2008; NA: April 23, 2009
- Genre: Massively multiplayer online role-playing
- Mode: Multiplayer

The Chronicles of Spellborn was a massively multiplayer online role-playing game (MMORPG) initially released on November 27, 2008, developed by Spellborn International and distributed by Frogster Interactive, Mindscape and Acclaim Games; set in a post-apocalyptic fantasy world. Spellborn used the Unreal Engine, featured a European Art approach and contained notable contributions from Jesper Kyd. In August 2010, the game was shut down.

As of 2019, the game is still playable on a proprietary private server that is operated by a former developer.

== Gameplay ==
Spellborn consisted largely of conventional MMORPG gameplay, in which the player plays a character (avatar), and explores the gameworld in order to gain experience points and advance in level. In exploring the gameworld, the player encounters quests, the most important part of Spellborn's gameplay. The game had about a thousand of these quests. Completing quests was the primary means of earning experience points. Repeatedly killing enemies ("Grinding" in gaming jargon) to gain levels was not a practical option in Spellborn. Separate from other story-driven quests were the Ancestral Quests, which allowed the player to take the role of a major character in Spellborn's history to accomplish a specific requirement. Players needed to complete certain Ancestral Quests in order to advance their character's story arc.

Spellborn incorporated a first-person targeting system. In this system, the player selected an available skill to use, while aiming at the opponent. The player could also use two skills at the same time to create combinations.

In Spellborn the player could choose Humans and Daevis as race, who can become all classes and feature no special advantages or flaws. At character creation the player could also select one of three archetypes, which then spread into three different classes each at level 5. Every class got access to several different skills, which could be used in combat, but due to the Skilldeck system players can only choose between a few at any time. Every skill a character had learned in a career was listed in the skill book. Some skills were unique to certain classes, while others were shared between them. Characters learned new skills as they increased in level. At maximum level a character could also learn the skills of the other archetypes (but not classes) by exploring certain places in the game's setting.

Unlike most games of its type, armor and weapons in Spellborn didn't provide any statistical improvements to the player's character. Instead, they served aesthetic purposes. Players could choose their character's appearance at the beginning of the game, and could change it later by using different items with higher requirements. Players could enhance their gear with Sigils. These enhancements were interchangeable between different items.

=== Setting ===
Since Spellborn focuses in a large part on doing quests, the game provided a certain amount of background information for the players. Spellborn's fictional history is divided into eight ages; players enter the world at its current age known as "The Time of the Enclave", 998 years after the shattering of the world. The game's world is divided into Shards of rock, remnants of the ancient world that are inhabited by the survivors of the cataclysm. Four main Shards were available for exploration by players.

== Development ==
In June 2009, the developers of Spellborn, Spellborn Works, went bankrupt. One of the publishers, Acclaim, announced the following month that the game would be re-developed as a free-to-play game supported by microtransactions. The new version would be released sometime after 2010, and until then the free-to-play version would remain active.

The game servers were shut down in August 2010. The Chronicles of Spellborn has not been re-released by any publisher since.

There is currently a private server running for The Chronicles of Spellborn right now, reviving the once dead MMO.
