= How to Talk to Girls at Parties (film) =

2017 film by John Cameron Mitchell

- Theatrical release poster
- Directed by: John Cameron Mitchell
- Screenplay by: Philippa Goslett; John Cameron Mitchell
- Based on: "How to Talk to Girls at Parties" by Neil Gaiman
- Produced by: Howard Gertler; Iain Canning; Emile Sherman; John Cameron Mitchell
- Starring: Elle Fanning; Alex Sharp; Ruth Wilson; Matt Lucas; Nicole Kidman
- Cinematography: Frank G. DeMarco
- Edited by: Brian A. Kates
- Music by: Nico Muhly; Matmos
- Production companies: See-Saw Films; Little Punk; Film4; Screen Yorkshire; Delish Films; Cross City Films; HanWay Films
- Distributed by: StudioCanal (United Kingdom); A24 (United States)
- Release dates: 21 May 2017 (Cannes); 11 May 2018 (United Kingdom); 25 May 2018 (United States)
- Running time: 102 minutes
- Countries: United Kingdom; United States
- Language: English
- Box office: $385,733

How to Talk to Girls at Parties is a 2017 science fiction romantic comedy film directed by John Cameron Mitchell from a screenplay he co-wrote with Philippa Goslett, based on the 2006 short story of the same name by Neil Gaiman. The film stars Elle Fanning, Alex Sharp, Ruth Wilson, Matt Lucas and Nicole Kidman. Principal photography began on 9 November 2015 in Sheffield.

The film had its world premiere at the Cannes Film Festival on 21 May 2017. It was released in the United Kingdom on 11 May 2018 by StudioCanal UK and in the United States on 25 May 2018 by A24.

== Plot ==
A young punk named Enn and his best friends stumble upon a bizarre gathering of teenagers from another planet, visiting Earth to complete a mysterious rite of passage. Enn falls madly in love with Zan, a beautiful and rebellious alien who becomes fascinated with him. Together, they embark on a delirious adventure through the kinetic punk rock world of 1970s London, inadvertently setting off a series of events that leads to the ultimate showdown between punks and aliens.

== Cast ==
- Elle Fanning as Zan, a rebellious young alien curious about Earth
- Alex Sharp as Enn, a punk comic book artist and Zan's love interest
- Ruth Wilson as PT Stella, one of the alien leaders
- Matt Lucas as PT Wain, one of the alien leaders
- Nicole Kidman as Queen Boadicea, an old-school punk who manages the local punk hangout
- AJ Lewis as Vic, Enn's best friend
- Ethan Lawrence as John, Enn's other best friend
- Edward Petherbridge as PT First, the alien supreme leader
- Joanna Scanlan as Marion, Enn's mother
- Tom Brooke as PT Waldo, Zan's parent, one of the alien leaders
- Martin Tomlinson as Slap, a punk singer managed by Boadicea
- Rory Nolan as young Enn, Zan and Enn's son

== Filming ==
Principal photography on the film began on 9 November 2015 in Sheffield, which would be standing in for London.

== Release ==
In September 2015, A24 acquired US distribution rights to the film. It had its world premiere at the Cannes Film Festival on 21 May 2017. It was released in the United Kingdom on 11 May 2018 by StudioCanal and in the United States on 25 May 2018.

== Reception ==
On the review aggregator website Rotten Tomatoes, the film holds an approval rating of 47% based on 97 reviews, with an average rating of 5.3/10. The website's critics consensus reads, "How to Talk to Girls at Parties has energy and ambition, but is ultimately too unfocused to do much with either – or develop its themes into a cohesive whole." Metacritic, which uses a weighted average, assigned the film a score of 50 out of 100, based on 24 critics, indicating "mixed or average" reviews.

David Rooney of The Hollywood Reporter stated that despite the charming characters of Elle Fanning (a curious alien) and Nicole Kidman (a nihilistic low priestess), its attempts to "add political substance feels less than half-cooked" and in effect sacrifices "narrative cohesion" and "overcomplicates" Neil Gaiman's 18-page story. Owen Gleiberman of Variety wrote, "The film enunciates its raw themes—punk means individuality! the aliens are all about conformity!—but never begins to figure out how to embody those themes in a narrative that could lure in the audience."
