= Faceless Men =

- House of the Dragon episode
- Episode no.: Season 3 Episode 6
- Directed by: Loni Peristere
- Written by: David Hancock; Shyam Popat
- Cinematography by: P.J. Dillon
- Editing by: Frances Parker
- Original air date: July 26, 2026
- Running time: 62 minutes

Episode chronology
← Previous "Unbowed and Unbent"	Next → "The Dragon in Winter"
- House of the Dragon season 3

"Faceless Men" is the sixth episode of the third season of the fantasy drama television series House of the Dragon. A prequel to Game of Thrones, the series depicts the events leading up to the decline of House Targaryen during a devastating war of succession for the Iron Throne of Westeros known as the "Dance of the Dragons". The episode was written by David Hancock and Shyam Popat and directed by Loni Peristere. It first aired on HBO and HBO Max on July 26, 2026.

In the episode, Criston faces the Tully army, while Gwayne arrives in Tumbleton to join Ormund and Daeron. Alys continues her manipulation of Aemond as Rhaenyra concocts a plan involving Alicent to finally have him killed. Daemon's investigation into the murders of the City Watchmen continues, as Hugh takes matters into his own hands in order to reunite with Kat.

The episode received a mixed-to-positive reception from critics, who praised the continuing machinations of Ormund, the Riverlands opening sequence, and the performances of the cast, particularly Matt Smith, Freddie Fox, Emma D'Arcy, Kieran Bew, Ellora Torchia, and Fabien Frankel, but felt the episode as a whole was inferior to earlier episodes of season three and questioned some of the plot decisions.

== Plot ==
In the Riverlands, Criston's men are ambushed by Tully soldiers posing as corpses. After defeating them, they are surrounded by Oscar and Roderick's army. Criston challenges the two commanders to duel, but is unceremoniously shot dead by Alysanne Blackwood and the army wipes out the rest of Criston's men.

At Harrenhal, Aemond wants to search for Vhagar, but Alys persuades him to stay by revealing a secret clutch of dragon eggs laid by Dreamfyre decades prior. Alys suggests she and Aemond begin a new dynasty of dragonriders together before they share a kiss.

In the Vale, Rhaena sees Addam and Baela and attempts to meet them. Guards catch Rhaena and bring her to Jeyne, who chastises her.

Gwayne arrives in Tumbleton where Ormund mocks him for abandoning Criston. Privately, Daeron begs Gwayne not to leave him again as he does not want to be Ormund's puppet king. Ormund is pleased when a House Baratheon envoy arrives to swear allegiance to Daeron. Gwayne realizes that they are assassins sent by Rhaenyra, and kills them, saving Ormund and Daeron's lives. Hugh sneaks into Tumbleton, where he reunites with his wife Kat, but she rejects Hugh for abandoning his family and refuses to leave with him.

In King's Landing, Alicent and Helaena are discovered and confined more strictly. Alicent pleads with Rhaenyra to be more lenient with Helaena, first revealing her pregnancy and then disclosing one of Helaena's prophetic dreams – about Aemond hiding at Harrenhal. Rhaenyra orders Alicent to travel to Harrenhal with an assassin to lure Aemond into a false sense of security, in exchange for the safety of Helaena and her unborn child. During a Small Council meeting, Rhaenyra is torn between supporting Daemon or Mysaria. Trying to reconcile with the smallfolk who blame her for increasing crime in the city, she sends Alyn to persuade Corlys to dispatch Velaryon men to patrol the city. Later, Alyn and Baela share a moment of sympathy and kiss. With many men deserting the City Watch, (Note: In Unbowed and Unbent, Luthor and several other men of the City Watch were marked as traitors and murdered.) Daemon, disguised as Watchman, lures and kills a Hightower assassin, but fails to learn any information from him. He then causes a scene when encountering Ulf on the street and publicly humiliates him.

In the Crownlands, Aegon, Larys, and Tyland bury the refugee leader's corpse and argue over their next direction. Aegon asks Tyland if he thinks Aegon is a good man, to which Tyland cannot reply coherently. Aegon then agrees to follow Larys' plan to flee to Essos. In a Velaryon camp, Alyn persuades Corlys to send his men to King's Landing. After Alyn leaves, Corlys and his soldiers are ambushed by a Hightower garrison led by Jon Roxton.

== Production ==
=== Writing ===
"Faceless Men" was written by David Hancock and Shyam Popat. The episode marks Hancock's fourth writing credit and Popat's first, and Peristere's third directing credit.

Discussing Criston's death, Fabien Frankel stated that he was aware that his character would die from the start, having read Fire & Blood prior to auditioning, and found out before production began on the third season that Cole's death was imminent, but did not know the specific episode until he read the script. He felt the scene was "poetically written" and stated, "it would've been easy to give him a villain's death, I don't think they have. His final act is saying, "If I strike my banners, will you spare my men their lives," right? And for a character who at times has probably avoided a level of heroism, I think at least there's a somewhat honourable final moment. I don't know that the journey to that point has been so honourable. But certainly, in its very final moments, it feels honourable." He expressed that, while he is aware that Criston has always been a polarizing character with fans, he hopes the death offered him some redemption and that he was ready to accept death, even if he had not specifically predicted when his death would come. Frankel explained that the fight scenes were filmed in one run from start to finish across seven takes and that he wanted Criston's exhaustion to be palpable on-screen. Of Criston dying while holding Alicent's handkerchief, Frankel stated, "any remains of soldiers that are ever found in war, the thing that they have on their person is almost always a photograph of a loved one, a totem from a relationship, a wedding ring, whatever it is — those are the things that they carry with them. Alicent is the person who pulled him out when he was going to kill himself in season one, [when] he's in the woods, and he's ready to take the knife to his own chest, and she stops him from doing that. For that to be the same face that he sees the next time he's that close to death felt very poetic to me."

Regarding Daeron's contrasting relationships with Ormund and Gwayne, Benjamin Evan Ainsworth explained that he, James Norton, and Freddie Fox spoke at length with showrunner Ryan Condal to establish the different dynamics, describing his relationship with Ormund as "fatherly and domineering" and with Gwayne as "much more almost brotherly". He felt that Daeron acts "out of survival" around Ormund and that " the stakes have escalated the last time Gwayne has been here". Ainsworth stated that a "it's almost like there's a weight lifted off his shoulders" when Gwayne arrives in Tumbleton and that he sees him as "someone to connect with" as well as the only real connection he has to his mother Alicent. Discussing the assassination attempt, Ainsworth explained that Daeron sees a new side to Ormund, whom he describes as "debilitated" and that this would start to shift the power dynamics between them moving forwards. Similarly, Norton felt that Gwayne brings out Ormund's "true authentic self" and that he and Fox "nodded to sort of a very complicated history" during the episode.

Ewan Mitchell expressed that he feels there is a "kinship" between Aemond and Alys and joked that "before they know it, they might turn into Bonnie and Clyde". Gayle Rankin instead compared the relationship to the one depicted in Misery and described the "push and pull" of their dynamic as they both fight for control and stated that Alys was "locked in" and knows what to do to keep Aemond close to her. Of the dragon eggs, Rankin explained, "there's something about Aemond's desire for a family, to potentially be a father, to be a good guy, change his ways, and the eggs both symbolise crazy power within the universe but also power within the relationship". Condal added that Alys "sees the humanity" in Aemond, something which no other character has done, and that she capitalises on this vulnerability by "presenting this future that I don't think he ever thought he'd have".

Of Rhaenyra's ultimatum to Alicent towards the end of the episode, Emma D'Arcy stated, "it's become increasingly important to Rhaenyra to believe and to know that her rule is preordained in some way. This suffering is part of a greater plan, and to enlist the services of a dreamer is to get a glimpse of that plan" and that "from the moment that Alicent and Helaena make their escape attempt, I think Rhaenyra feels deeply hurt. She craves the gratitude, actually, of her prisoners. This sort of marks the first time we see Rhaenyra really kind of inflict her new power on Alicent".

=== Filming ===
The episode was directed by Loni Peristere, who also directed the season premiere "Salt and Sea, Fire and Blood", as well "The Red Sowing" in season two.

The Riverlands battle that opens the episode was filmed in Barossa nature reserve in Surrey, with Peristere describing it as "a bit of a horror movie" as Cole and his men explore the abandoned Tully camp before discovering living soldiers posing as corpses. Cinematographer PJ Dillon noted that it was important for viewers to feel as if they were following Cole's perspective the whole time, and made sure the cameras were "constantly moving" to hint that things weren't quite right. Frankel described Cole's last stand as his favorite scenes to film in season three and called it "incredibly choreographed" that he wanted to look "sluggish" to reflect Cole's exhaustion. Stunt co-ordinator Rowley Irlam stated that, while Cole wields several weapons during the fight, the morning star that he uses is "one of the most difficult pieces of equipment to use in a fight", and that armorer Tim Lewis created a real-looking one for Frankel to use in the scene, something Lewis noted was very challenging because they had to ensure it did not fall apart and had hidden compartments for fake blood.

=== Casting ===
The episode stars Matt Smith as Daemon Targaryen, Emma D'Arcy as Rhaenyra Targaryen, Olivia Cooke as Alicent Hightower, James Norton as Ormund Hightower, Steve Toussaint as Corlys Velaryon, Fabien Frankel as Criston Cole, Matthew Needham as Larys Strong, Sonoya Mizuno as Mysaria, Tom Glynn-Carney as Aegon II Targaryen, Ewan Mitchell as Aemond Targaryen, Bethany Antonia as Baela Targaryen, Phia Saban as Helaena Targaryen, Phoebe Campbell as Rhaena Targaryen, Jefferson Hall as Tyland Lannister, Kurt Egyiawan as Orwyle, Freddie Fox as Gwayne Hightower, Gayle Rankin as Alys Rivers, Abubakar Salim as Alyn of Hull, Benjamin Evan Ainsworth as Daeron Targaryen, Kieran Bew as Hugh Hammer, Tom Bennett as Ulf White, Ellora Torchia as Kat, Tommy Flanagan as Roderick Dustin, Joplin Sibtain as Jon Roxton, and Dan Fogler as Torrhen Manderly.

It marks the final appearance of Frankel as Criston Cole, following the death of the character.

== Release ==
The episode premiered on July 26, 2026, on HBO and HBO Max.

== Reception ==
Helen O'Hara of IGN gave the episode a score of 9 out of 10 and wrote, "this is a damn good episode, and we're removing a point only because it feels less like it's delivering the killer blows and more that it's setting them up for the near future." She further declared, "at the three-quarter mark, this season is easily the best in the show's history. It's nuanced and complex – look at the Alicent and Rhaenyra scene discussing Helaena's pregnancy – but doesn't feel like it's being artificially complicated all the time for no real reason. Instead, all the endless movement feels earned and all the more upsetting for that." O'Hara specifically praised the opening scenes in the Riverlands calling them "killer", the "heartbreaking" conversation between Hugh and Kat, and the continued machinations of Ormund.

In a slightly more mixed review for Den of Geek, David Crow gave the episode 3 stars out of 5, stating "I've been a defender of season 3 up to this episode, but this week I find myself in the same No Man's Land as the lambs led to the Butcher's Ball Slaughter. And like a certain white knight, it's leaving me exhausted". He praised Fabien Frankel's performance as Criston Cole writing, "the abject surprise of a final, bitter disappointment—one last fantasy torn asunder—in Frankel's eyes is enough to almost make me pity this pathetic man. Almost." and Matt Smith's performance as Daemon writing, "Smith was in fine form last week when he showed he can still conjure the Rogue Prince's devious charisma while pep-talking the local police force. This week, the actor was even better threading a sense of aging disconnect in the same rogue's pleas as he begs more men to die for him and his wife.". He also praised Emma D'Arcy's performance as Rhaenyra, noting that they "play this version of Rhaenyra as deeply sympathetic, but in tonight's episode in particular, they're coloring the queen with the blindness of privilege and elitism. She really is her father's daughter; a monarch who cocoons herself in a space of moral relativism", and lauded the depiction of Ormund's machinations as the cause of much of Rhaenyra's struggles in King's Landing, as well as the "deeply rewarding" dynamic between him, Daeron, and Gwayne in the episode. He was less positive on Rhaena's storyline, calling it a "bizarre subplot with the arrested-development dragon" and felt Kat's responses to Hugh were "a bit ham-fisted". Crow was highly critical of what he perceived to be the show killing off Corlys Velaryon at the end of the episode, feeling it undercut his character and was a major deviation from the books. He also felt that Rhaenyra sending Alicent to Harrenhal was "baffling".

Daniel Roman of Winter is Coming was mixed on Criston's death, writing, "Criston dies within the first few minutes of the episode, and then this important death is completely buried by 50 more minutes of television. I can't help but wonder if it would have been even more impactful if it occurred at the end of episode 5, instead of right at the start of episode 6", despite noting that the show successfully depicted his death as an "anti-climax". He praised the development of Hugh and Ulf's characters, stating of their conversation outside of Tumbleton: "it's a compelling scene that has me desperate to see more of these two characters together" and lauded the later scene between Hugh and Kat, praising the performances of Kieran Bew and Ellora Torchia writing, "Torchia and Bew deliver one of the standout scenes of the episode, with Kat breaking down and refusing to flee the city with Hugh, which provokes him into trying to abduct her by force. The way Kat is visibly shaken, disgusted by what Hugh has become, is heartbreaking — as well as foreboding. How Hugh will change even more from this interaction is one of the biggest question I have heading into the season's final two episodes." He also praised Matt Smith's scene with the Gold Cloaks writing, "it's another great scene for Smith, who continues to prove in episode after episode that he and Daemon are one of the strongest elements that House of the Dragon has going for it" and praised the interplay between Tom Glynn-Carney, Matthew Needham, and Jefferson Hall as Aegon, Larys, and Tyland. Roman was critical of the romance between Alyn and Baela, feeling it was "rushed" since the characters have only shared one scene together prior to this and contrasted this with the Alys/Aemond storyline which he felt worked much better, praising Gayle Rankin and Ewan Mitchell for "show[ing] a more vulnerable side of their characters". He also questioned Rhaena's storyline in the Vale despite praising Amanda Collin's "riveting" performance as Jeyne Arryn, but lauded the Tumbelton scenes and "intriguing dynamic" that was created by adding Gwayne into scenes with Ormund and Daeron, adding that Freddie Fox "is doing a wonderful job in the part and I want more of him". Roman was highly critical of Alicent's storyline, expressing that "it's become increasingly obvious this season that the show has no idea what to do with Alicent".

Erica Gonzales of Elle interviewed Annie Shapero about the episode, with Shapero noting, "There was something so clever about having her [Alysanne] come in for the killing shot in a way that was just so 'get the job done' ... It's also a really devastating motif as well when you look at how Jace died. They've mirrored it beautifully." Sayantan Choudhary of Wiki of Thrones notes, "Fabien Frankel opened up on The Tonight Show with Jimmy Fallon about the surprising wave of support he's received from fans after Criston Cole's death[:] People tell me they saw me die on TV and happy I'm alive in real life, and… [Laughter] There's an outpouring. ... The Criston Cole fans hid for a long time, but they're out. ... There's one or two out there somewhere."
