= The Dynamics of an Asteroid =

Fictional book from the Sherlock Holmes book series

The cover of The Dynamics of an Asteroid, from the 2011 film Sherlock Holmes: A Game of Shadows.

The Dynamics of an Asteroid is a fictional book by Professor James Moriarty, the implacable foe of Sherlock Holmes. The only mention of it in Arthur Conan Doyle's original Holmes stories is in The Valley of Fear (written in 1914, but set in 1888) when Holmes says of Moriarty:

Is he not the celebrated author of The Dynamics of an Asteroid, a book which ascends to such rarefied heights of pure mathematics that it is said that there was no man in the scientific press capable of criticizing it?

Participants in the "Sherlockian game", where Sherlock Holmes fans elaborate on elements within Doyle's stories, have suggested other details about The Dynamics of an Asteroid.

== Related real works ==
In 1809, Carl Friedrich Gauss wrote a ground-breaking treatise on the dynamics of an asteroid (Ceres). However, Gauss's method was understood immediately and is still used today.

Two decades before Arthur Conan Doyle's writing, the Canadian-American dynamic astronomer Simon Newcomb had published a series of books analyzing motions of planets in the Solar System. The notoriously spiteful Newcomb could have been an inspiration for Professor Moriarty.

In 1887, Henri Poincaré's submission to the celestial mechanics contest of King Oscar II of Sweden investigated the three-body problem, a theoretical basis of asteroid dynamics. It was also hard to criticize, as both the jury (Weirstrass, Mittag-Leffler, and Hermite, all top-notch mathematicians) and the author himself missed a fatal error in the submission (later corrected).

Another example of mathematics too abstruse to be criticized is the letters of Srinivasa Ramanujan, sent to several mathematicians at the University of Cambridge in 1913. Only one of these mathematicians, G. H. Hardy, even recognized their merit. Despite being experts in the branches of mathematics used, he and J. E. Littlewood added that many of them "defeated me completely; I had never seen anything in the least like them before." It has taken over a century for this work to be understood; the last sub-field (and the last problem of the last sub-field) have been referred to as The Final Problem in explicit reference to the Sherlock Holmes story. Holmes only states that "it is said" (emphasis added) that no one in the scientific press was capable of criticizing Moriarty's work; he stops short of recognizing the claim as indisputably accurate.

Similarly, when it was jocularly suggested to Arthur Eddington in 1919 that he was one of only three people in the world who understood Albert Einstein's theory of relativity, Eddington quipped that he could not think who the third person was.

== Discussion of possible book contents ==
Doyle provided no indication of the contents of Dynamics other than its title. Speculation about its contents published by later authors includes:

- "The Ultimate Crime", short story by Isaac Asimov, in More Tales of the Black Widowers, and republished in Sherlock Holmes through Time and Space.
- "The Dynamics of an Asteroid", short story by Robert Bloch, The Baker Street Journal, 1953, and also found in The Game is Afoot.
- "The Adventure of the Russian Grave", a short story by William Barton and Michael Capobianco, collected in Sherlock Holmes in Orbit.
- In the novel Spider-Man: The Revenge of the Sinister Six, by Adam-Troy Castro, a veiled reference is made to Moriarty and his Dynamics. Here the work is said to still be the authority on orbital bombardment.
- Physicist Alejandro Jenkins in 2013 suggested chaos theory, an esoteric branch of mathematics whose association with asteroid dynamics was not appreciated by real-world mathematicians until the work of Henri Poincaré in 1890.
- Simon P. Norton and Alain Goriely have each suggested that the book might have been Moriarty's submission to the 1887 celestial mechanics contest of King Oscar II of Sweden (which was won by Henri Poincaré.)

=== Related references in media ===
- A different Sherlock Holmes story, The Final Problem, mentions another mathematical paper by Moriarty - "a treatise on the binomial theorem". It was written when Moriarty was only 21 years of age.
- In "His Last Vow", the final episode of series 3 of the BBC television series Sherlock, Sherlock's mother, M.L. Holmes, is shown to have written a lengthy textbook with the title The Dynamics of Combustion, a reference to this book.
- In "Henny Penny the Sky Is Falling", the 100th episode of the CBS television series Elementary, the plot evolves around a fictional paper with the title Miscalculating Near-Earth Asteroids and the Threat to Human Existence.
- The pastiche novel Professor Moriarty: The Hound of the D'Urbervilles by film critic and horror novelist Kim Newman includes a chapter parodying both "The Adventure of the Red-Headed League" and H. G. Wells's novel The War of the Worlds, in which an arrogant former student of Moriarty's named Nevil Airey-Stent publicly rubbishes The Dynamics of an Asteroid to prove that it is indeed susceptible to criticism, prompting an enraged Moriarty to orchestrate an elaborate plan to drive Stent insane by convincing him that he has been contacted by visitors from the planet Mars.
- In the 2017 mobile game Fate/Grand Order, Moriarty's Noble Phantasm is called The Dynamics of an Asteroid. During the Shinjuku Pseudo-Singularity, his goal is to destroy the Earth following the theory developed in this book using the asteroid 101955 Bennu as the "bullet," and the abilities of the Phantom Spirit of der Freischütz to guarantee it will destroy the Earth.
