= Unbowed and Unbent =

- House of the Dragon episode
- Episode no.: Season 3 Episode 5
- Directed by: Nina Lopez-Corrado
- Written by: Philippa Goslett
- Cinematography by: Richard Donnelly
- Editing by: Brenna Rangott
- Original air date: July 19, 2026
- Running time: 67 minutes

Episode chronology
← Previous "Tumbleton"	Next → "Faceless Men"
- House of the Dragon season 3

"Unbowed and Unbent" is the fifth episode of the third season of the fantasy drama television series House of the Dragon. A prequel to Game of Thrones, the series depicts the events leading up to the decline of House Targaryen during a devastating war of succession for the Iron Throne of Westeros known as the "Dance of the Dragons". The episode was written by Philippa Goslett and directed by Nina Lopez-Corrado. It first aired on HBO and HBO Max on July 19, 2026.

In the episode, both Rhaenyra's allies and bounty hunters continue the search for Aemond and Vhagar. Daemon attempts to control the spiralling situation in King's Landing while Ormund continues his occupation of Tumbleton. Criston and Gwayne disagree on the best path forward as their circumstances become dire, Alicent tries to formulate a plan following the revelation of Helaena's pregnancy, and Larys loses patience with Aegon.

The episode received a positive critical reception, with praise for the writing and performances of the cast, particularly Ewan Mitchell, Fabien Frankel, Matthew Needham, Phia Saban, and Olivia Cooke.

== Plot ==
In the Riverlands, Oscar's army is besieged by guerrilla attacks from Criston's men. In retaliation, Oscar sends Roderick and his Winter Wolves ahead to plant caltrops and burn a bridge crossing to slow Criston down. Apathetic, Criston refuses Gwayne's offer to serve under the Hightowers and proclaims he will die a noble death. Disillusioned, Gwayne abandons Criston.

Addam and Baela continue searching for Vhagar, connecting over their insecurities and hopes for the future. At Harrenhal, groups of bounty hunters arrive searching for Aemond, but are repelled by Alys. Aemond, recovering from his wounds, is tormented by visions of Aegon dying, and confides in Alys that his mother does not love him. Alys comforts him, and when bounty hunters assault Alys, Aemond saves her.

At Rook's Rest, Aegon complains that he has been wronged all his life and believes his mother loved Aemond more. Larys berates him for his many character flaws and convinces Aegon that they should flee Westeros. They later reunite with Tyland, who survived the Battle of the Gullet. Aegon then kills the refugee camp's leader to prevent the trio from being compromised.

In Tumbleton, Ormund tells Daeron the story of Princess Meria Martell, who maintained Dorne's independence from the Targaryens. Ormund has coins minted with Daeron's likeness and has spies bring them to King's Landing to spread awareness of Daeron's claim as the rightful king.

In King's Landing, Rhaenyra's Small Council clash over priorities, with Mysaria vying for the smallfolk and Daemon for the City Watch. Rhaenyra invites Sabitha Frey to join the council to placate her frustrations about not receiving Harrenhal. (Note: In "Regent", Jace promised lordship over Harrenhal to House Frey in exchange for allowing the Winter Wolves to use their river crossing and bring their army south.) Rhaenyra shares a moment of weakness and insecurity with Daemon, who tries to give her courage. Alicent has Orwyle secretly bring abortifacient tea for Helaena, only for her to refuse and share that she had a vision about Aemond at Harrenhal. They attempt to escape the Red Keep but are caught by Mysaria, who Alicent convinces not to tell Rhaenyra. Alicent and Helaena later discover a secret passage, but become trapped.

Daemon investigates the murders of multiple City Watchmen. He and Luthor capture and interrogate one of the assassins and learn that Ormund was responsible for hiring them. After informing Rhaenyra that Ormund has declared Daeron king, Daemon finds Luthor and several of his men gruesomely murdered and displayed as traitors.

== Production ==
=== Writing ===
"Unbowed and Unbent" was written by Philippa Goslett, and directed by Nina Lopez-Corrado. The episode marks Goslett's first writing credit and Lopez-Corrado's first directing credit.

Discussing Criston's headspace, Fabien Frankel advised that his determination to die what he sees as an honorable death in battle has been "brewing inside of him so much over the course of the show" and stated, "Criston Cole started as a soldier before the 20-year stretch that he spent at King's Landing — that's how he started, and that's how he wants to finish. In his mind, the only honest version of himself is the soldier. Everything else is pretense", adding that Cole feels dying with a sword in his hand "feels honest" to him. Frankel felt there was a "genuine fondness" that Criston has for Gwayne, describing them as "yin-yang", but feeling that their relationship was strengthened during their battles together despite Gwayne representing "everything that Criston disdains in this world". He also expressed that he believes Criston is so intent on his plan because it allows him to avoid confronting the feelings of abandonment he has following his relationships with Rhaenyra and Alicent and his service of Aemond.

Regarding Daemon's motivations in the episode, Matt Smith explained, "Daemon wants to reclaim his kingdom on behalf of his wife. And so, suddenly, to be confronted with this other element of foe is quite interesting" and said of the Gold Cloaks, "they're his team of people, he's always had an affinity with the Gold Cloaks. Obviously, he's been away, but he's come back. He's still their sort of commander-in-chief." Showrunner Ryan Condal added, "Daemon is feeling rather impotent, to a degree. He's able to play whack-a-mole and chase around these sort of faceless villains in the city, but he knows the real villain [Ormund] is 60 leagues away, in a place where he can't yet reach him" and that Daemon and Rhaenyra "don't know how to wage combat" against Ormund, which is by his own design. Further expanding on this, Condal explained, "His design, at the end of the day, is to make sure that nobody wants to be a Gold Cloak, and people are afraid to mount a defense in Rhaenyra's name". Of the episode's ending, Goslett stated, "both Rhaenyra and the audience finally understand Ormund's true intent. If Aegon and Aemond can't be found, then he still has Daeron. He's an incredibly dangerous man, and Ormund will do anything and everything to destabilize Rhaenyra's reign".

=== Casting ===
The episode stars Matt Smith as Daemon Targaryen, Emma D'Arcy as Rhaenyra Targaryen, Olivia Cooke as Alicent Hightower, James Norton as Ormund Hightower, Fabien Frankel as Criston Cole, Matthew Needham as Larys Strong, Sonoya Mizuno as Mysaria, Tom Glynn-Carney as Aegon II Targaryen, Ewan Mitchell as Aemond Targaryen, Bethany Antonia as Baela Targaryen, Phia Saban as Helaena Targaryen, Jefferson Hall as Tyland Lannister, Kurt Egyiawan as Orwyle, Freddie Fox as Gwayne Hightower, Gayle Rankin as Alys Rivers, Abubakar Salim as Alyn of Hull, Clinton Liberty as Addam of Hull, Benjamin Evan Ainsworth as Daeron Targaryen, Tommy Flanagan as Roderick Dustin, Joplin Sibtain as Jon Roxton, and Dan Fogler as Torrhen Manderly.

It marks the final appearance of co-stars Antonio Magro as Petyr Piper and Tom Cullen as Luthor Largent, following the death of both characters. Ainsworth joins the main cast in this episode after co-starring in the previous episode and appearing uncredited in the season premiere.

== Release ==
The episode premiered on July 19, 2026, on HBO and HBO Max.

== Reception ==
Helen O'Hara of IGN gave the episode a score of 9 out of 10 and called it "as gripping as Game of Thrones ever was", and "another really solid episode that mixes military strategy, political scheming and personal dysfunction to hugely successful effect". She praised the characterization of Criston Cole, stating of his actions, "somehow this particular display of arrogance makes him more likeable and not less; after spending all of last season moping, this guy is fascinating by comparison", and enjoyed the duality between Aegon and Aemond's storylines and the contrasting responses they receive from Larys and Alys respectively. She also enjoyed the "really interesting" development of Helaena's character in the episode, as well as the conflicting priorities of Rhaenyra and Daemon. Concluding her review, O'Hara wrote, "this season continues to fire on all cylinders – or dragons, possibly. Even as viewers we can see the forces aligning against Rhaenyra and the pitfalls that surround her, and yet she seems oblivious. A lot of characters are growing increasingly desperate, and that tends to lead to outbreaks of violence in the very near future. It's also a great performance episode, particularly for Fabien Frankel, Phia Saban and Olivia Cooke".

Alec Bojalad of Den of Geek gave the episode four stars out of five, particularly praising the dark tone and writing, "by focusing on arcs like Criston's doomed insurgency in the Riverlands, Prince Aemond's internment in a spooky haunted castle, and a banquet for the dead, this hour goes further in articulating the bleak nature of life at war than the show's previous depictions of war itself". He felt Cole's storyline was the highlight of the episode, but also praised the scene between Rhaneyra and Daemon in the High Sept, expressing that, "the pair's extended conversation in High Valyrian is some of the best fictional foreign language acting this franchise has produced yet and goes a long way towards establishing Rhaenyra's deteriorating mental state and paranoia."

Daniel Roman of Winter is Coming called the episode season three's "tightest, most cohesive hour yet" and gave it an A+ grade, writing, "House of the Dragon season 3 episode 5 isn't the most groundbreaking episode of the series, but it makes up for its lack of major showstoppers by simply being an exceptionally well-crafted hour of television that never lets up on the viewer, delivering intriguing developments, shocking twists, and stellar character moments in scene after scene after scene. This is the first episode of the season that really reminded me of classic Game of Thrones at its best, and I really can't offer better praise than that." He praised Goslett's writing, Lopez-Carrado's direction, the tense tone, the characterisation of Criston Cole and the cast performances stating, "this is a standout episode for Fabien Frankel as the tortured knight. It's also a very solid one for Freddie Fox's Gwayne, who retains his infectiously endearing optimism and honor in the face of impossible odds, right up until the point where it becomes unavoidably clear that Criston wants this death for himself, and will not be deterred from it even if it gets every man following him killed as well. It's incredibly compelling stuff, and writer Philippa Goslett makes the material sing, even in its bleakness." He felt the storyline with Aemond and Alys is "off to a strong start" and praised Ewan Mitchell's swordplay during Aemond's fight scene, and lauded the performances of Matthew Needham and Tom Glynn-Carney during the scene where Larys berates Aegon, and praising the contrast in the writing between Aegon and Aemond's stories in the episode. Roman admitted his dislike of Ormund and Daeron's dynamic in the previous episode, but was more positive towards it here, writing that their scene, "took me from being a hater to being extremely engaged over the course of a single scene, and it's such a credit to how writer Philippa Goslett handled their relationship here." He also lauded Daemon and Rhaenyra's scene in the High Sept, stating, "this High Valyrian scene is exceptionally well done on pretty much every front; writing, acting, the set and cinematography and natural light from the candles illuminating the scene. Daemon and Rhaenyra's partnership is not at the forefront of this episode with everything else going on, but in this moment, it's clear something is fracturing".
