= Philippa Goslett =

British screenwriter (born 1974)

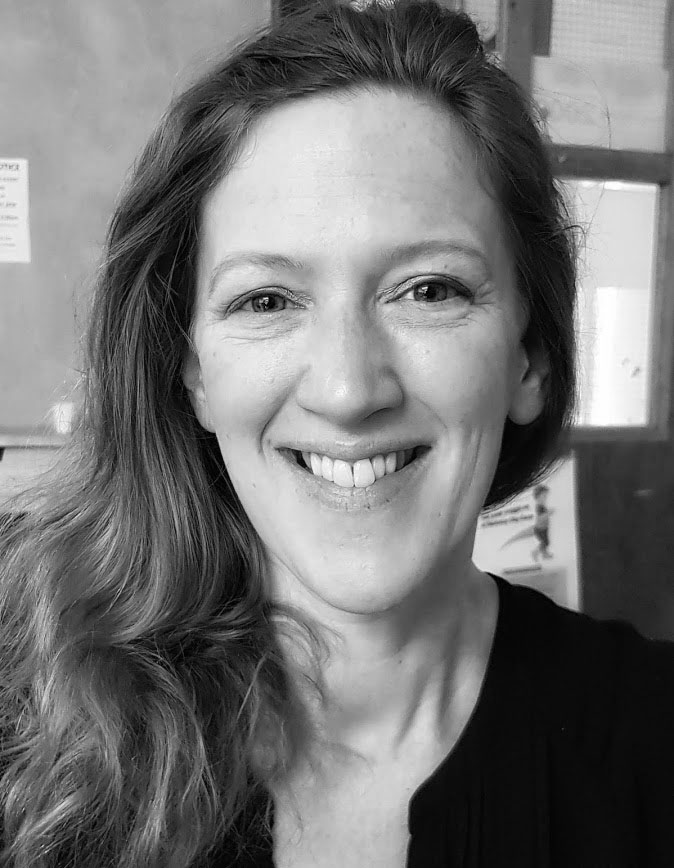
- Goslett in 2018
- Born: 3 February 1974 (age 52); London, United Kingdom
- Occupation: screenwriter
- Years active: 1999–present

Philippa Goslett is a British screenwriter. She wrote Little Ashes, a biopic about the relationship between a young Salvador Dalí (played by Robert Pattinson) and Federico García Lorca. It won the 2010 GLAAD Media Award for Outstanding Film, Limited Release.

She co-wrote the screenplay for How to Talk to Girls At Parties with director John Cameron Mitchell from a short story by Neil Gaiman. The film stars Elle Fanning, Alex Sharp, Nicole Kidman and Matt Lucas. The film was part of the Official Selection for the 2017 Cannes Film Festival

Goslett also co-wrote the screenplay for the 2018 film Mary Magdalene with Helen Edmundson. The film started Rooney Mara, Joaquin Phoenix, Chewitel Ejiofor and Tahar Rahim.

In 2018, she began writing Himalaya, a film based on Antonia Deacock's book No Purdah In Padam about three women who organised a 1958 expedition to the Himalayas.

On 28 January 2021 Goslett was announced as the new showrunner for The Nevers, taking over two months after the departure of Joss Whedon. Goslett has developed shows for other networks, such as FX, BBC and Channel 4, but this marks her first time as a showrunner.

In 2026, Goslett wrote two episodes of the third season of House of the Dragon: the fifth episode "Unbowed and Unbent", and the seventh episode "The Dragon in Winter".
