= Professor Moriarty =

Fictional character from Sherlock Holmes stories

- Sherlock Holmes character
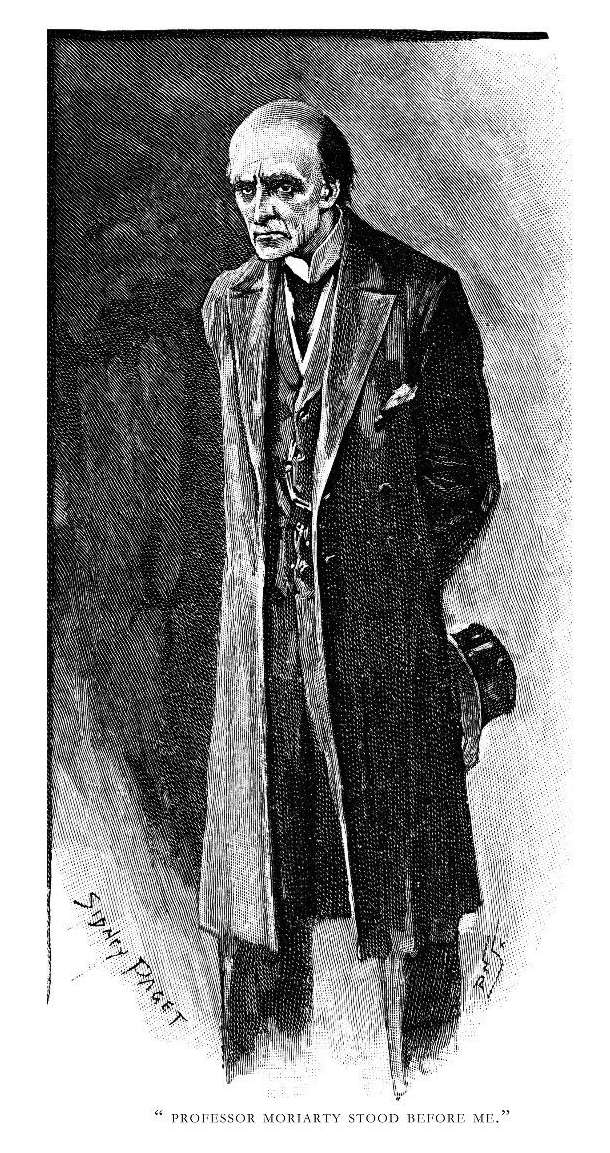
- Professor Moriarty, illustration by Sidney Paget which accompanied the original publication of "The Final Problem"
- First appearance: "The Final Problem" (1893)
- Created by: Sir Arthur Conan Doyle

In-universe information
- Full name: James Moriarty
- Occupation: Professor of mathematics (formerly); Criminal mastermind
- Family: One or two brothers
- Nationality: British

Professor James Moriarty is a fictional character and criminal mastermind created by Sir Arthur Conan Doyle to be a formidable enemy for the author's fictional detective Sherlock Holmes. He was created primarily as a device by which Doyle could kill Holmes and end the hero's stories. Professor Moriarty first appears in the short story "The Adventure of the Final Problem", first published in The Strand Magazine in December 1893. He also plays a role in the final Sherlock Holmes novel The Valley of Fear, but without a direct appearance. Holmes mentions Moriarty in five other stories: "The Adventure of the Empty House", "The Adventure of the Norwood Builder", "The Adventure of the Missing Three-Quarter", "The Adventure of the Illustrious Client", and "His Last Bow".

Moriarty is an international criminal gang leader who uses his intelligence and resources to provide criminals with crime strategies and sometimes protection from the law, all in exchange for a fee or a cut of profit. Holmes likens Moriarty to a spider at the centre of a web and calls him the "Napoleon of crime", a phrase Doyle lifted from a Scotland Yard inspector referring to Adam Worth, a real-life criminal mastermind and one of the individuals upon whom the character of Moriarty was based. Despite appearing only twice in Doyle's original stories, later adaptations and pastiches have given Moriarty greater prominence, often using him as the main antagonist, and treated him as Sherlock Holmes' archenemy.

== Appearances in works ==
Professor Moriarty's first appearance occurred in the 1893 short story "The Adventure of the Final Problem" (set in 1891). The story features consulting detective Sherlock Holmes revealing to his friend and biographer Doctor Watson that for years now he has suspected many seemingly isolated crimes to actually all be the machinations of a single, vast, and subtle criminal organisation. After investigation, he has uncovered Professor Moriarty as a mastermind who provides strategy and protection to criminals in exchange for obedience and a share in their profits. Moriarty realizes Holmes is aware of his operation and confronts him in person, threatening death if Holmes interferes any further.

Holmes describes Moriarty's physical appearance to Watson, saying the professor is extremely tall and thin, clean-shaven, pale, and ascetic-looking. He has a forehead that "domes out in a white curve", deeply sunken eyes, and shoulders that are "rounded from much study". His face protrudes forward and is always slowly oscillating from side to side "in a curiously reptilian fashion". Holmes mentions that during their meeting, Moriarty remarked in surprise, "You have less frontal development than I should have expected," indicating the criminal believes in phrenology.

Holmes ignores the threat and delivers appropriate evidence to the police so Moriarty and those who operate his network will face justice in a few days. Knowing the mastermind and his trusted lieutenants intend to kill him before they hide or are arrested, Holmes flees to Switzerland, and Watson joins him. The mastermind follows, his pursuit ending when he confronts Holmes at the top of the Reichenbach Falls. Watson does not witness the confrontation but arrives later to find signs of hand-to-hand combat occurring at the cliff edge near the waterfall, indicating the battle ended with both men falling to their deaths. Watson also finds a goodbye note left behind by Holmes that Moriarty allowed him to write before their battle.

Moriarty plays a direct role in only one other Holmes story, The Valley of Fear (1914), set before "The Final Problem" but written afterwards. In The Valley of Fear, Holmes attempts to prevent Moriarty's men from committing a murder. A policeman who interviewed Moriarty tells Holmes that the professor has a painting by Jean-Baptiste Greuze hanging on his office wall. Learning this, Holmes mentions the great value of another painting by the same artist, pointing out such works could not have been purchased on a university professor's salary. The work referred to is La jeune fille à l'agneau; which some commentators have described as a pun by Doyle on a famous Thomas Gainsborough painting, the Portrait of Georgiana, Duchess of Devonshire, which was taken from the Thomas Agnew and Sons art gallery. The gallery believed Adam Worth (the criminal who helped inspire Doyle to create Moriarty) was responsible, but was unable to prove the claim.

Holmes mentions Moriarty in five other stories: "The Adventure of the Empty House" (the immediate sequel to "The Final Problem"), "The Adventure of the Norwood Builder", "The Adventure of the Missing Three-Quarter", "The Adventure of the Illustrious Client", and "His Last Bow" (the final adventure in Holmes's canon timeline, taking place years after he has officially retired).

Doctor Watson, even when narrating, never meets Moriarty (only getting distant glimpses of him in "The Final Problem"). Watson relies upon Holmes to relate accounts of the feud between the detective and the criminal. Doyle is inconsistent on Watson's familiarity with Moriarty. In "The Final Problem", Watson tells Holmes he has never heard of Moriarty, while in "The Valley of Fear", set earlier on, Watson already knows of him as "the famous scientific criminal."

In "The Empty House", Holmes says Moriarty commissioned a powerful air gun from a blind German mechanic surnamed von Herder, a weapon later used by the professor's employee/acolyte Colonel Moran. It closely resembles a cane, allows easy concealment, is capable of firing revolver bullets at long range, and makes very little noise when fired, making it ideal for criminal sniping. Moriarty also has a marked preference for organising lethal "accidents" to befall his targets. His attempts to kill Holmes include falling masonry and a speeding horse-drawn vehicle. He is also responsible for stage-managing the death of Birdy Edwards, making it appear the man was lost overboard while sailing to South Africa.

== Personality ==
Moriarty is highly ruthless, shown by his steadfast vow to Sherlock Holmes that "if you are clever enough to bring destruction upon me, rest assured that I shall do as much to you". Moriarty is categorised by Holmes as an extremely powerful criminal mastermind adept at committing any atrocity to perfection without losing any sleep over it. It is stated in "The Final Problem" that Moriarty does not directly participate in the activities he plans, but only orchestrates the events or provides the plans that will lead to a successful crime. What makes Moriarty so dangerous is his extremely cunning intellect:

He is a man of good birth and excellent education, endowed by nature with a phenomenal mathematical faculty. [...] But the man had hereditary tendencies of the most diabolical kind. A criminal strain ran in his blood, which, instead of being modified, was increased and rendered infinitely more dangerous by his extraordinary mental powers. [...] He is the Napoleon of crime, Watson. He is the organiser of half that is evil and of nearly all that is undetected in this great city...

— Holmes, "The Final Problem"

Holmes echoes and expounds this sentiment in The Valley of Fear, stating:

The greatest schemer of all time, the organizer of every devilry, the controlling brain of the underworld, a brain which might have made or marred the destiny of nations—that's the man! But so aloof is he from general suspicion, so immune from criticism, so admirable in his management and self-effacement, that for those very words that you have uttered he could hale you to a court and emerge with your year's pension as a solatium for his wounded character. [...] Foulmouthed doctor and slandered professor—such would be your respective roles! That's genius, Watson.

— Holmes, The Valley of Fear

Moriarty respects Holmes's intelligence, stating: "It has been an intellectual treat for me to see the manner in which you [Holmes] have grappled with this case." Nevertheless, he makes numerous attempts upon Holmes's life through his agents. He shows a fiery disposition, becoming enraged when his plans are thwarted, resulting in his being placed "in positive danger of losing my liberty". While personally pursuing Holmes at a train station, he furiously elbows aside passengers, heedless of whether this draws attention to himself.

Doyle's original motive in creating Moriarty was evidently his intention to kill Holmes off. "The Final Problem" was intended to be exactly what its title says; Doyle sought to sweeten the pill by letting Holmes go in a blaze of glory, having rid the world of a criminal so powerful and dangerous that any further task would be trivial in comparison (as Holmes says in the story itself). Eventually, however, public pressure and financial troubles impelled Doyle to bring Holmes back. While Doyle conceded to revealing that Holmes did not die during "The Final Problem" (as Watson mistakenly concludes), he chose not to undo Moriarty's death in a similar fashion. For this reason, the later novel The Valley of Fear features Moriarty as an active villain but is specified to take place before the events of "The Final Problem".

== Fictional character biography ==
As established in Doyle's canon, Moriarty first gains recognition at the age of 21 for writing "a treatise upon the Binomial Theorem", which leads to his being awarded the Mathematical Chair at one of England's smaller universities. Moriarty later authors a highly respected work, The Dynamics of an Asteroid. After he becomes the subject of unspecified "dark rumours" in the university town, he is compelled to resign his teaching post and leave the area. He relocates to London and establishes himself as an "army coach", a private tutor to officers preparing for exams. He becomes a consulting criminal mastermind for various London gangs and criminals. (It is uncertain if he was already doing this before leaving his teaching post.) When multiple plans of his are hampered or undone by Sherlock Holmes, Moriarty targets the consulting detective.

Multiple pastiches and other works outside of Doyle's stories purport to provide additional information about Moriarty's background. John F. Bowers, a lecturer in mathematics at the University of Leeds, wrote a tongue-in-cheek article in 1989 in which he assesses Moriarty's contributions to mathematics and gives a detailed description of Moriarty's background, including a statement that Moriarty was born in Ireland (an idea based on the fact that the surname is Irish in origin). The 2005 pastiche novel Sherlock Holmes: The Unauthorized Biography also reports that Moriarty was born in Ireland and states that he was employed as a professor by Durham University. According to the 2020 audio drama Sherlock Holmes: The Voice of Treason written by George Mann and Cavan Scott, Moriarty was a professor at Stonyhurst College (where Arthur Conan Doyle was educated and knew two students with the surname Moriarty).

=== Family ===
The stories give contradictory indications about Moriarty's family. In his first appearance in "The Final Problem" (1893), the villain is referred to only as "Professor Moriarty". Watson mentions no forename but does refer to the name of another family member when he writes of "the recent letters in which Colonel James Moriarty defends the memory of his brother". In "The Adventure of the Empty House" (1903), Holmes refers to Moriarty as "Professor James Moriarty". This is the only time Moriarty is given a first name, and oddly, it is the same as that of his purported brother. In the 1914 novel The Valley of Fear (written after the preceding two stories, but set earlier), Holmes says of Professor Moriarty: "He is unmarried. His younger brother is a station master in the west of England." In Sherlock Holmes: A Drama in Four Acts, an 1899 stage play, of which Doyle was a co-author, the villain is named Professor Robert Moriarty.

Writer Vincent Starrett suggested that Moriarty could have one brother (who is both a colonel and station master) or two brothers (one a colonel and the other a station master); he added that he considered the presence of two siblings more likely, and suggested that all three brothers were named James. Writer Leslie S. Klinger suggested that Professor Moriarty has an older brother named Colonel James Moriarty in addition to an unnamed younger brother. According to Klinger, writer Ian McQueen proposed that Moriarty does not actually have any brothers, while Sherlockian John Bennett Shaw suggested, like Starrett, that there are three Moriarty brothers, all named James.

== Real-world role models ==
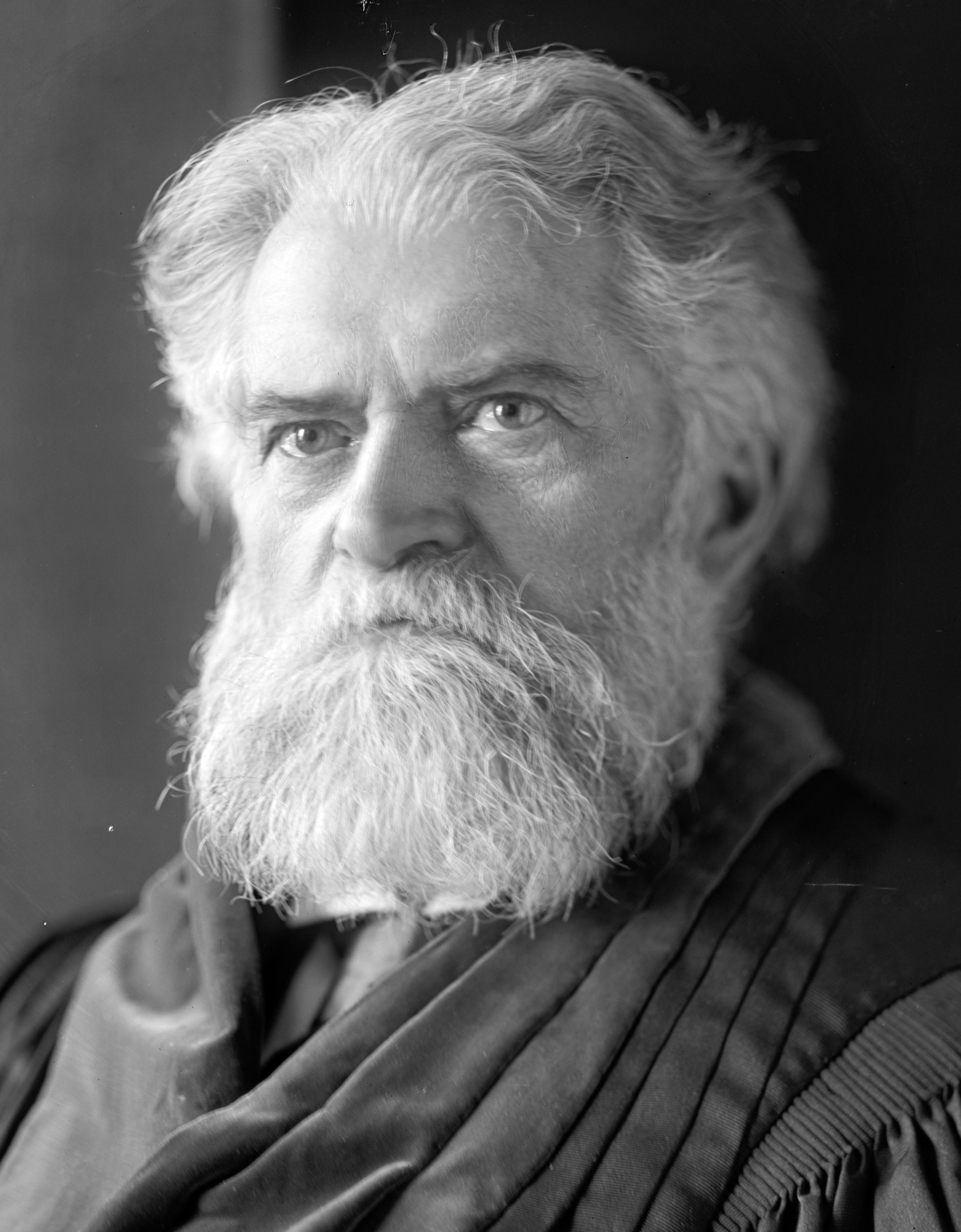
Simon Newcomb (circa 1905), one possible model for Moriarty

"Moriarty" is an ancient Irish name as is Moran, the surname of Moriarty's henchman, Sebastian Moran. Doyle himself was of Irish Catholic descent, educated at Stonyhurst College, although he abandoned his family's religious tradition, neither marrying nor raising his children in the Catholic faith, nor cleaving to any politics that his ethnic background might presuppose. Doyle is known to have used his experiences at Stonyhurst as inspiration for details of the Holmes series; among his contemporaries at the school were two boys surnamed Moriarty.

ln addition to the master criminal Adam Worth, there has been speculation among astronomers and Sherlock Holmes enthusiasts that Doyle based his fictional character Moriarty on the Canadian-American astronomer Simon Newcomb. Newcomb was revered as a multitalented genius, with a special mastery of mathematics, and he had become internationally famous in the years before Doyle began writing his stories. More to the point, Newcomb had earned a reputation for spite and malice, apparently seeking to destroy the careers and reputations of rival scientists.

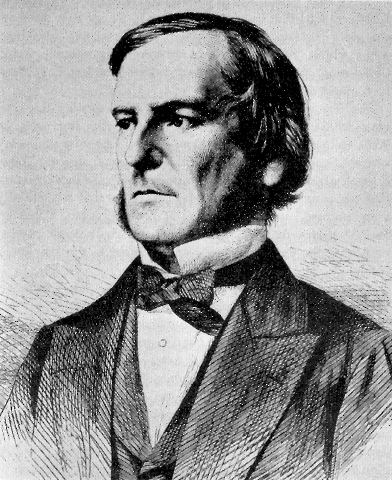
George Boole (circa 1860), another possible model for Moriarty

Moriarty may have been inspired in part by two real-world mathematicians. If the characterisations of Moriarty's academic papers are reversed, they describe real mathematical events. Carl Friedrich Gauss wrote a famous paper on the dynamics of an asteroid in his early 20s, and was appointed to a chair partly on the strength of this result. Srinivasa Ramanujan wrote about generalisations of the binomial theorem, and earned a reputation as a genius by writing articles that confounded the best extant mathematicians. Gauss's story was well known in Doyle's time, and Ramanujan's story unfolded at Cambridge from early 1913 to mid 1914; The Valley of Fear, which contains the comment about maths so abstruse that no one could criticise it, was published in September 1914. Irish mathematician Des MacHale has suggested George Boole may have been a model for Moriarty.

It is averred that surviving Jesuit priests at the preparatory school Hodder Place, Stonyhurst, instantly recognised the physical description of Moriarty as that of the Rev. Thomas Kay, SJ, Prefect of Discipline, under whose authority Doyle fell as a wayward pupil. According to this hypothesis, Doyle as a private joke has Inspector MacDonald describe Moriarty: "He'd have made a grand meenister with his thin face and grey hair and his solemn-like way of talking."

The model which Doyle himself cited (through Sherlock Holmes) in The Valley of Fear is the London arch-criminal of the 18th century, Jonathan Wild. He mentions this when seeking to compare Moriarty to a real-world character that Inspector Alec MacDonald might know, but it is in vain as MacDonald is not so well read as Holmes.

== Legacy ==
T. S. Eliot's character Macavity the Mystery Cat is based on Moriarty. Author Timothy Zahn's fictional Star Wars warlord Nuso Esva is also based on the professor; in fact, if each consonant and vowel of the character's name is replaced with the consonants and vowels before them in the Latin alphabet, "Nuso Esva" becomes "Moriarty."

A Sherlockian society was formed by noted Sherlockian John Bennett Shaw called "The Brothers Three of Moriarty", in honour of Professor Moriarty and his two brothers. The group held annual dinners in Moriarty, New Mexico.

The action film The League of Extraordinary Gentlemen (2003) has a character named "M", later known as Moriarty.

The character also inspired a manga series called Moriarty the Patriot (2016), a retelling of Sherlock Holmes where there are three brothers, all named James Moriarty, who embody Holmes' nemesis.

== See also ==
- List of actors who have played Professor Moriarty
