= Wooga =

German game developer

Wooga GmbH
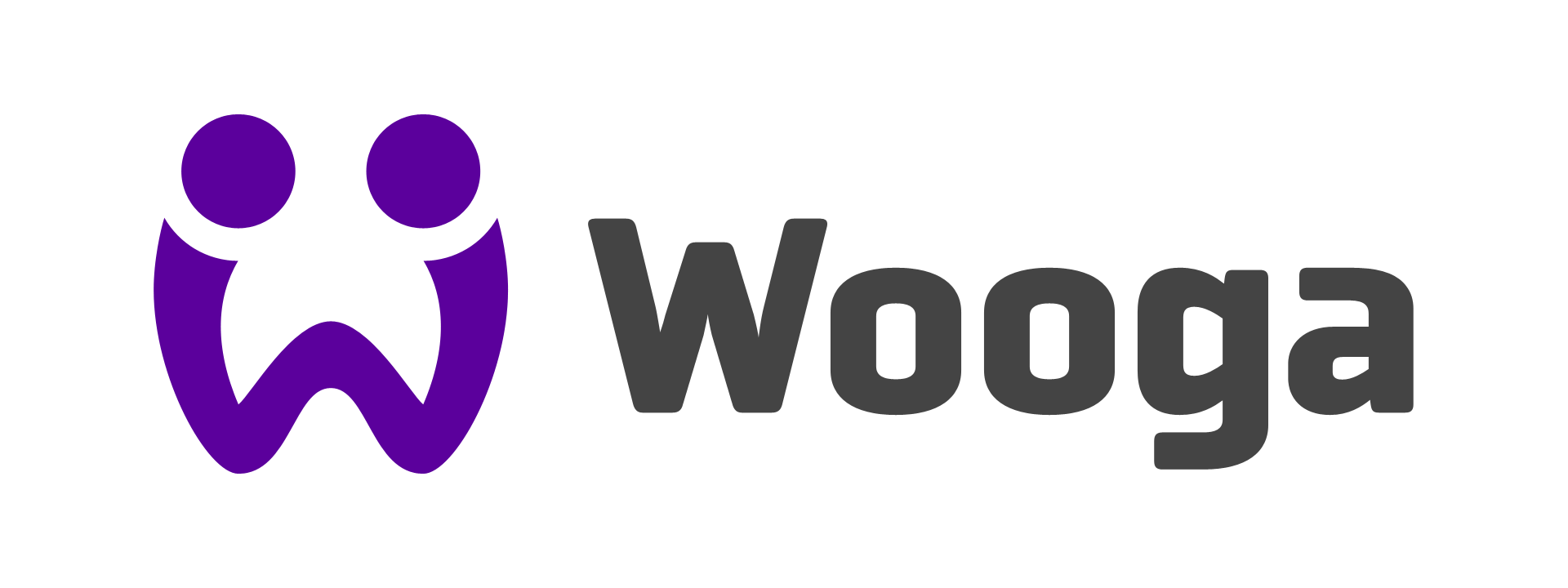
- Type: Private
- Industry: Video game industry; social network service; mobile games; game development; casual games; Facebook games
- Founded: 2009; 17 years ago
- Founders: Jens Begemann; Philipp Moeser
- Headquarters: Berlin, Germany
- Number of employees: 325 (2024)
- Website: wooga.com

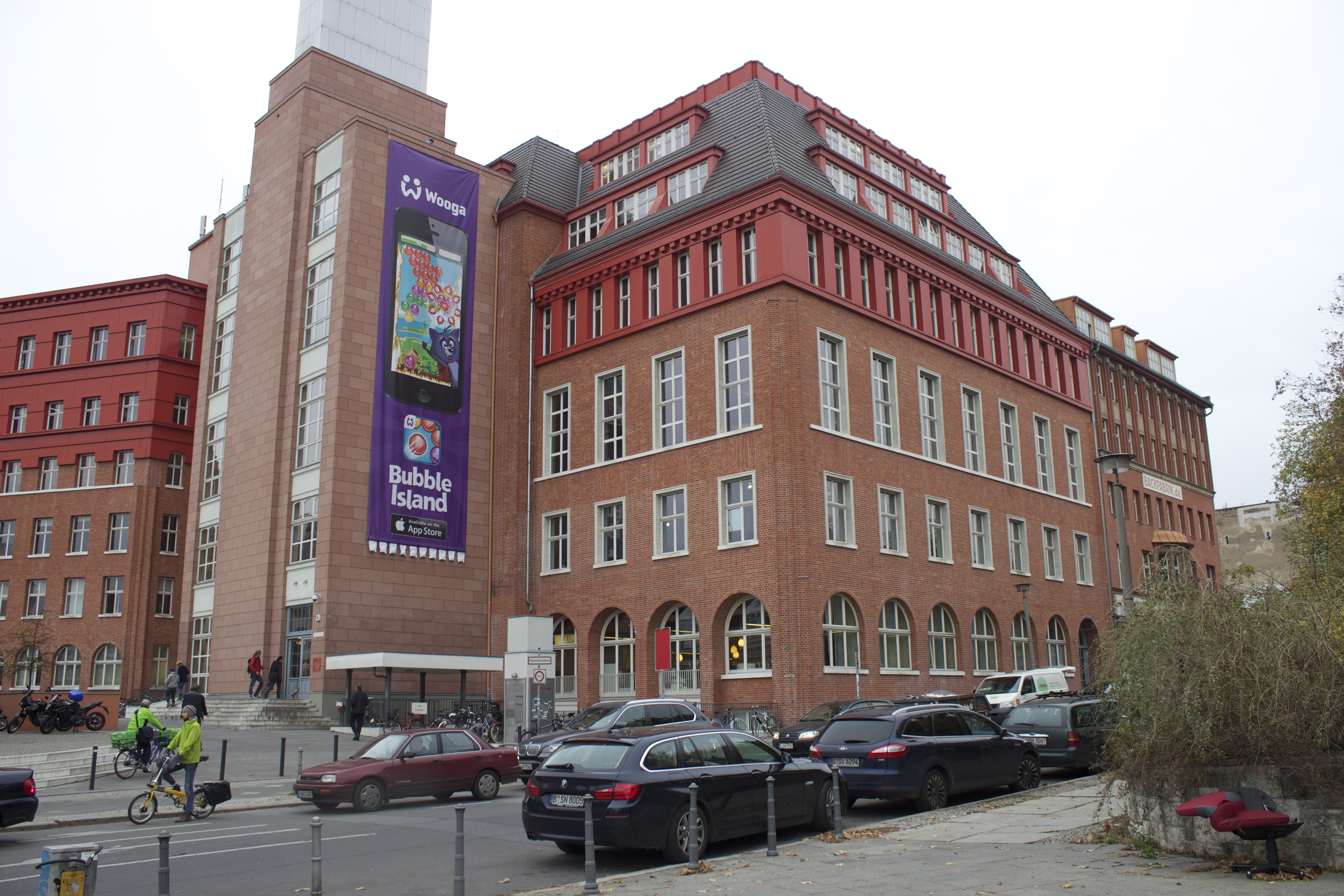
The Wooga offices in Berlin, Germany

Wooga is a German game software company based in Berlin that develops story-driven casual games for mobile devices, such as smartphones and tablets and social networks like Facebook. It has developed mobile games such as June's Journey, Pearl's Peril and Switchcraft. The company is part of the social games company Playtika. Their name comes from the words "World of Gaming".

== History ==
Wooga was founded in January 2009 by Jens Begemann (CEO), Patrick Paulisch, and Philipp Moeser (CTO). Paulisch has since left Wooga. The first games released were only available on social networks, first and foremost on Facebook. The first game developed by Wooga was Brain Buddies, a quiz game released in July 2009. Wooga received €5 million in a round of funding led by Balderton Capital in November 2009. Holtzbrinck Ventures, which had provided funding earlier that year, also participated in this round.

In April 2010, Wooga released its second game, Monster World. That same year, Holtzbrinck Ventures and Balderton Investment stepped in, helping to fund a third game. In October 2010, the company employed 50 people; in 2011, that number increased to 150.

In November 2010, Wooga launched Happy Hospital. In March 2011, Wooga launched Diamond Dash. The company raised a Series B Round of $24 million funding in May 2011. Magic Land Island was launched during the GDC Europe in August 2011 in Cologne. In June 2012, the HTML5 game was open sourced under the name Pocket Island on GitHub under MIT license and with the assets under Creative Commons license CC BY-NC-SA.

With the progressive development of mobile technology and the global spread of mobile devices, Wooga's focus shifted in 2012 to games for the mobile sector. Diamond Dash was first game they released for iPhone and iPad on the iOS App Store (December 2011). In December 2012, Diamond Dash became the first Wooga game for Android smartphones and tablets. On 22 August 2013, Jelly Splash was the first game to be released for mobile devices first. The game was subsequently released on Facebook in September 2013 and on Android in October 2013. For Jelly Splash, Wooga entered into a cooperation with the South Korean internet service provider Kakao, and the game was launched as a test title for their KakaoTalk platform on 9 November 2013.

In March 2013, Wooga launched both Monster World mobile for iOS and Pearl's Peril. Pearl's Peril became the company’s fastest selling game. On 10 April 2013, Wooga launched Pocket Village. In May, they launched Fantastic Forest and Kingsbridge on 21 and 28 March, respectively. In December 2013, Jelly Splash reported monthly active users of 8.2 million. In February 2014, Fantastic Forest was relaunched as Farm Tales.

Investments in smartwatch games in 2015 did not pay off and sales plummeted for the first time. The trend continued in 2016, when newly developed games, such as Agent Alice, no longer brought in the same success figures. That year, the company laid off 40 employees and terminated projects from the previous year. After that, Wooga continued to develop its casual gaming strategy. This direction was implemented in particular with the launch of the most successful game to date, June's Journey, at the end of 2017. Wooga decided to exclusively focus on the casual games segment and on story-driven casual games.

On 20 May 2015, Wooga launched Crazy Kings (developed by TicBits). On 6 October 2016, Wooga launched Bubble Island 2. As of July 2018, the company employs 200 people.

In December 2018, Wooga was acquired for more than $200 million by Israeli gaming company Playtika. The COVID-19 pandemic, which boosted the entire industry, also boosted business at Wooga. The mystery hidden object game June's Journey turned over $500 million by mid-2022 since its launch.

In March 2020, Nai Chang replaced the previous CEO Jens Begemann. In the same year, Wooga employed 250+ people. Since Playtika Holding Corporation's IPO on the US stock exchange Nasdaq in January 2021, Wooga GmbH has been part of a listed company. In December 2024, Dennis Korf joined Wooga as Nai Chang's Successor and is the current Managing Director of Wooga. https://www.pocketgamer.biz/february-2025-mobile-movers-and-shakers/

=== Funding ===
In May 2011, Wooga raised $24 million in venture capital. The largest backers were the US investor Highland Capital Partners and the German publishing group Georg von Holtzbrinck. Holtzbrinck and Balderton Capital had already invested €4.4 million in venture capital in November 2009. Although all of Wooga's games are free-to-play games, whose basic game content can be used free of charge, Wooga generates revenue via paid elements and in-app purchases. In total, six games contributed to revenue in 2020 and total revenue increased by 56 percent to €128.18 million compared to 2019.

Revenue in Mio. EUR
2014	2015	2016	2017	2018	2019	2020
47.608	40.911	37.727	34.353	53.104	82.495	128.184

Sources: Bundesanzeiger

== Games ==
Wooga GmbH develops casual games. These are games for mobile devices such as smartphones and tablets that players do not play for long at a stretch. Since focusing on story-driven casual games, the Berlin-based developer studio has been producing plot-driven games aimed primarily at female casual gamers.

The games developed for Facebook are social games. Here users exchange ideas, share their success or help each other in the respective game worlds. These types of games generate reach by using viral marketing, whereby players can invite their friends to a game via Facebook.

=== Portfolio ===
==== Facebook Games ====
- Diamond Dash
- Bubble Island
- Monster World
- Magic Land
- Happy Hospital
- Brain Buddies
- Kingsbridge
- Farm Tales
- Pearl’s Peril
- Jelly Splash
- June's Journey

==== Smartphone games ====
- Diamond Dash
- Bubble Island
- Jelly Splash
- Pearl's Peril
- June's Journey
- Agent Alice
- Futurama: Game of Drones
- Tropicats
- Bubble Island 2
- Switchcraft
- Monster World
- Ghost Detective

== Awards (Selection) ==
- 2010: Award for Best Social Game for Bubble Island at the European Games Award
- 2011: Award for best Social Game for Diamond Dash and award for "Best European Games Company" at the European Games Award
- 2011: Award as best newcomer startup of the decade by Gründerszene
- 2013: People's Choice Award at The Europas by tech blog Techcrunch
- 2021: Audience Award for the implementation of real tree planting through the participation of the game June's Journey at the Green Game Jam
- 2022: Awarded as Leading Employer
- 2022: Players Choice Award for June's Journey at the Green Game Jam 2022

== Sustainability ==
In a collaboration with the search engine Ecosia, Wooga took part in the Green Game Jam, an initiative sponsored by the United Nations Environment Programme (UNEP), with its game June's Journey in 2021 and 2022. In the game, Wooga players were able to reforest a forest in their game world and plant trees virtually, which enabled Ecosia to subsequently coordinate tree plantings around the world in reality. Over 60 tree planting projects in more than 30 countries have been supported in this way. In 2021, June's Journey planted 25,000 trees, for which Wooga won the audience award at the Green Game Jam.
