= Shadows Over Baker Street =

2003 anthology edited by Michael Reaves and John Pelan

- The cover of the first edition
- Author: Michael Reaves, John Pelan (editors)
- Cover artist: John Jude Palencar
- Language: English
- Series: Cthulhu Mythos, Sherlock Holmes
- Genre: Mystery, Horror, Crossover
- Publisher: Del Rey Books
- Publication date: September 30, 2003
- Publication place: United States
- Media type: Print (hardback & paperback)
- Pages: 464
- ISBN: 978-0-345-45273-3

Shadows Over Baker Street is an anthology edited by Michael Reaves and John Pelan and combining the worlds of H.P. Lovecraft's Cthulhu Mythos and Arthur Conan Doyle's Sherlock Holmes stories. Reaves and Pelan contributed the introduction. The estate of Arthur Conan Doyle approved the book's publication.

== Table of contents ==
Title	Year set	Author	Notes
"A Study in Emerald"	1881	Neil Gaiman	Won the 2004 Hugo Award for Best Short Story
"Tiger! Tiger!"	1882	Elizabeth Bear	
"The Case of the Wavy Black Dagger"	1884	Steve Perry	
"A Case of Royal Blood"	1888	Steven-Elliot Altman	Narrated by H.G. Wells
"The Weeping Masks"	1890	James Lowder	
"Art in the Blood"	1892	Brian Stableford	
"The Curious Case of Miss Violet Stone"	1894	Poppy Z. Brite, David Ferguson	
"The Adventure of the Antiquarian's Niece"	1894	Barbara Hambly	Thomas Carnacki is one of the main characters
"The Mystery of the Worm"	1894	John Pelan	Dr. Nikola also appears; an annotated version of this story was published in Studies in Modern Horror, issue no. 3
"The Mystery of the Hanged Man's Puzzle"	1897	Paul Finch	
"The Horror of the Many Faces"	1898	Tim Lebbon	
"The Adventure of the Arab's Manuscript"	1898	Michael Reaves	
"The Drowned Geologist"	1898	Caitlín R. Kiernan	
"A Case of Insomnia"	1899	John P. Vourlis	
"The Adventure of the Voorish Sign"	1899	Richard A. Lupoff	
"The Adventure of Exham Priory"	1901	F. Gwynplaine MacIntyre	
"Death Did Not Become Him"	1902	David Niall Wilson, Patricia Lee Macomber	
"Nightmare in Wax"	1915	Simon Clark	

== Similar works ==
A multitude of works not authored by Doyle have involved science fiction and supernatural elements. In terms of the Mythos, specifically, the Andy Lane novel All-Consuming Fire also combines Sherlock Holmes with the Mythos. As part of the Virgin New Adventures line, it also takes place in the "Whoniverse" introduced by Doctor Who and stars the Seventh Doctor from that series.

The 2007 adventure game Sherlock Holmes: The Awakened involves the Mythos, Cthulhu specifically. A remastered version appeared in 2008 and a remake in 2023.
