= Acclaim Games =

American video game company

Acclaim Games Incorporated
- Type: Subsidiary
- Industry: Video games
- Founded: January 6, 2006; 20 years ago
- Founder: Howard Marks
- Defunct: August 26, 2010; 16 years ago
- Fate: Dissolved
- Headquarters: Beverly Hills, California, U.S.
- Key people: Howard Marks
- Parent: Playdom (2010)

Acclaim Games Incorporated was an American video game company that offered free massively multiplayer online role-playing games on its website upon registration. The company was founded in 2006 and was the successor to Acclaim Entertainment in terms of brand name. After Acclaim Entertainment filed for bankruptcy, former Activision CEO Howard Marks purchased the "Acclaim" name in September 2004 for a reported $100,000. He, along with Neil Malhotra, set up a new company, Acclaim Games, that was to take a different approach to the market than Acclaim Entertainment.

While Acclaim Games primarily focused on bringing to North America and Europe online games originally from Asia, it also gave the opportunity to its registered members to submit video games they created. Acclaim Games relied on In-game advertising and items sales for revenues, while releasing the games themselves, free.

The company released fourteen games: The Chronicles of Spellborn, Kogamu, BOTS!! (which was its launching title), 9Dragons, 2Moons, Ponystars, Dance Online, My Diva Doll, Tribal Nations and Prize Potato. As of December 2007, the company had 15 million registered accounts and 500,000 active players across all games.

On May 18, 2010, Playdom acquired the company. Three months later, on August 26, Playdom closed Acclaim Games.

== Games ==
- Bots!! – A multi-player online fighting game in which players choose from one of three basic BOTS (Patch, Surge, and Ram) and then upgrade their character throughout the game. There are multi-player story modes that include Sector (Player vs Virus), PVP (Player/Team vs Player/Team) and Base (Base vs Base). This game has been out since April 2006. Before the game's original release, a 2D promo of the game was available for a short amount of time.
- Kogamu – Kogamu is effectively a lightweight MMORPG, modeled after the Korean "Dungeon and Fighter" title. This was the second title Project Top Secret winner Mike (Doran) Zummo spearheaded. All the action of the game takes place on side-scrolling screens occupied by randomly moving enemies that need to be beaten, shot, burned or otherwise killed off.
- RockFree – A Guitar Hero-like, free-to-play, flash based game. This game was the first title Project Top Secret winner Mike (Doran) Zummo worked on. Originally starting on the Web, RockFree allowed up to 8 players to face off playing the guitar tracks to popular songs. Leveraging licences from Aerosmith, Heart, and many others, the game attracted great attention. In a partnership with Slide, the game was ported to Facebook, where it peaked at 1.5 monthly average users before being discontinued.
- 9Dragons – A 3D MMORPG set in China during the Ming Dynasty. It includes actual Chinese geography and historical features such as the Great Wall of China and the Shaolin Temple. 9Dragons was developed by Korean company Indy21 and the lore and in-game storyline was remastered and re-directed in the United States by best-selling author Steven-Elliot Altman.
- 2Moons – A translation of the Korean MMORPG Dekaron by Gamehi, featuring a new story line. Published by Acclaim under the direction of David Perry, 2Moons uses an in-game advertising business model. In December 2007 the game had 500,000 active players, with fewer than 10% buying items through this advertising.
- Ponystars – an online virtual pets game, launched in June 2008. It is a US-hosted version of the French game Pony Valley and is operated in partnership with that game's creator, Feerik.
- My Diva Doll – A multi-player online fashion and decorating game. Partnership with French company Feerik.
- Tribal Nations – A multi-player online sim set in Mesoamerica. Partnership with French company Celsius Online. The game was based on Celsius Online's then-popular webgame Renaissance Kingdoms. After Acclaim ended the partnership, Celsius continued the game, renaming it Native Kingdoms.
- Prize Potato – This flash game was Acclaim's first foray into social games on Facebook. The final incarnation had people create characters that people in their social network voted on. The owner of the character with the most votes won major prizes like concert tickets, trips, video cameras, and more selected at the outset of the race.
- The Chronicles of Spellborn – MMORPG developed by Spellborn International, released on November 27, 2008, in Europe.
- Knight's Blood- A multi-player online fighting game with a medieval setting, created in partnership with RedMoonStudios GmbH & Co. KG.
- Muniz Online
- Prize Island
- Top Secret – A Scalable Multi-player Online Racing Game directed by David Perry and developed by Acclaim Games. It is an online collaboration in video game development, drawing on both established professionals and novices. The project also features a competition, where the top contributor will take the role as director for a new game.
- Dance! Online
