= The Final Problem =

Short story by Arthur Conan Doyle featuring Sherlock Holmes

- Short story by Arthur Conan Doyle
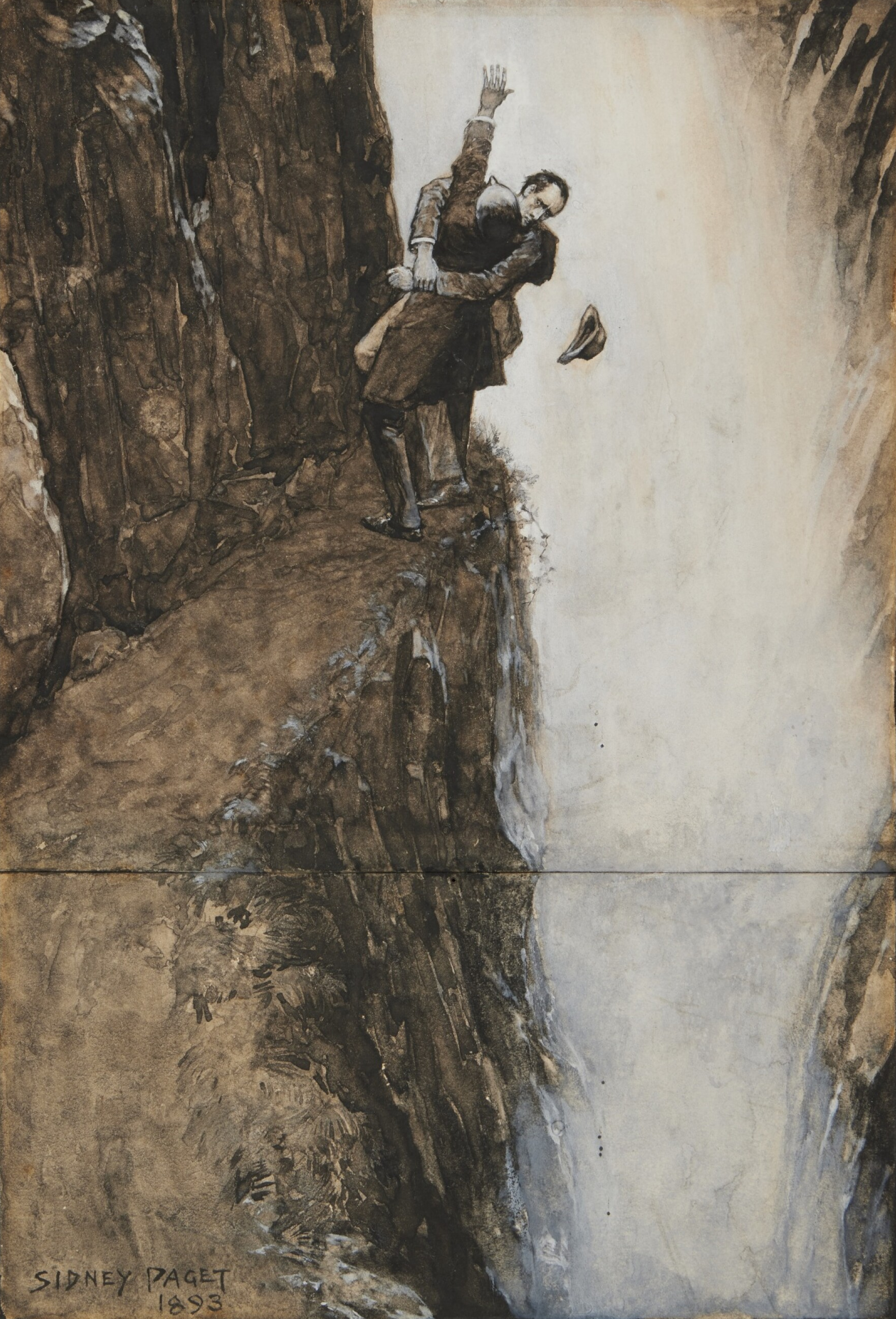
- Sherlock Holmes and Moriarty fighting at the Reichenbach Falls, 1893 original illustration by Sidney Paget for The Strand Magazine

Text available at Wikisource
- Country: United Kingdom
- Language: English
- Genre: Detective fiction short stories

Publication
- Published in: Strand Magazine
- Publication date: December 1893

Chronology
- Series: The Memoirs of Sherlock Holmes
The Adventure of the Naval Treaty	The Hound of the Baskervilles

"The Final Problem" is a short story by Sir Arthur Conan Doyle featuring his detective character Sherlock Holmes. It was first published in The Strand Magazine in the United Kingdom, and McClure's Magazine in the United States, under the title "The Adventure of the Final Problem" in December 1893. It appears in book form as part of the collection The Memoirs of Sherlock Holmes.

The story, set in 1891, introduces the criminal mastermind Professor Moriarty. It was intended to be the final Holmes story, ending with the character's death, but Doyle was later persuaded to revive Holmes for additional stories and novels.

== Plot ==
An injured Holmes arrives at Watson's residence one evening, having escaped three separate murder attempts that day. Holmes reveals to Watson he has been tracking Moriarty and his organisation for months, who are responsible for most of the crimes orchestrated in London. As Holmes is close to snaring them all and delivering them to the police, Moriarty visits Holmes at 221B Baker Street earlier that day and warns him to withdraw from his pursuit of justice against him. Holmes admits that Moriarty could thwart his plans given his great mind that could rival his, and plans to flee to Europe while the police capture Moriarty and his gang.

Holmes invites Watson to join him on the trip. Holmes then gives him unusual instructions intended to hide his tracks to the boat train at Victoria station before leaving Watson's house by climbing over the back wall in the garden, paranoid that he might be followed. The next day, Watson follows Holmes's instructions and finds himself waiting in the reserved first-class coach for his friend, who is disguised as an elderly Italian priest. Holmes informs Watson that the rooms at Baker Street had been set on fire the previous night, in an unsuccessful attempt to both kill him and destroy the evidence he had collected against Moriarty. As the boat train pulls out of Victoria, Holmes spots Moriarty on the platform trying to stop the train. Holmes deduces that Moriarty has tracked Watson despite extraordinary precautions. Changing their planned route, Holmes and Watson alight at Canterbury, hiding behind the luggage as Moriarty (who had chartered a special one-coach train) passes them in pursuit.

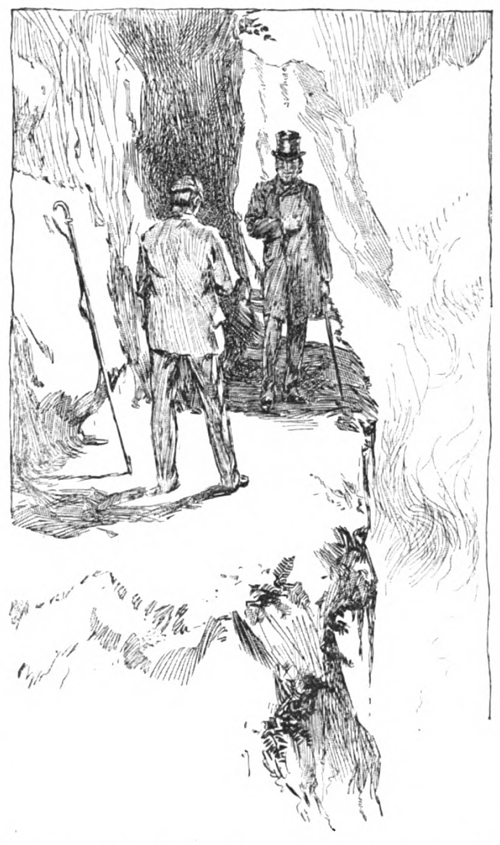
Holmes and Moriarty, 1893 illustration by Harry C. Edwards in McClure's

After Holmes and Watson have crossed the English Channel and made their way to Strasbourg via Brussels, Holmes receives a message from the London police that most of Moriarty's gang have been arrested in England, but Moriarty has escaped and is in pursuit of Holmes in Europe. He urges Watson to return to England as he considers himself a very dangerous companion, but Watson chooses to stay with him. The two continue to Meiringen, Switzerland and visit the Reichenbach Falls. At the Falls, a boy hands Watson a letter, saying that there is a dying Englishwoman at the hotel who seeks an English doctor. Holmes sends Watson back to tend to her and remains at the Falls.

Upon reaching the hotel, Watson discovers that he has been tricked and rushes back to aid Holmes. At the Falls, he only finds two sets of footprints that lead to the end of the path, where he uncovers other signs of a violent struggle and a note from Holmes explaining that he knew of the hoax but chose to fight Moriarty himself. It is all too clear to Watson that Holmes and Moriarty have both fallen to their deaths down the gorge while locked in mortal combat and their bodies cannot be recovered. Watson ends his narrative by saying that the Moriarty gang are all convicted on the strength of evidence secured by Holmes, and that despite Moriarty's brother defending the Professor's memory, Watson will regard Sherlock Holmes as the best and the wisest man he had ever known.

== Background ==
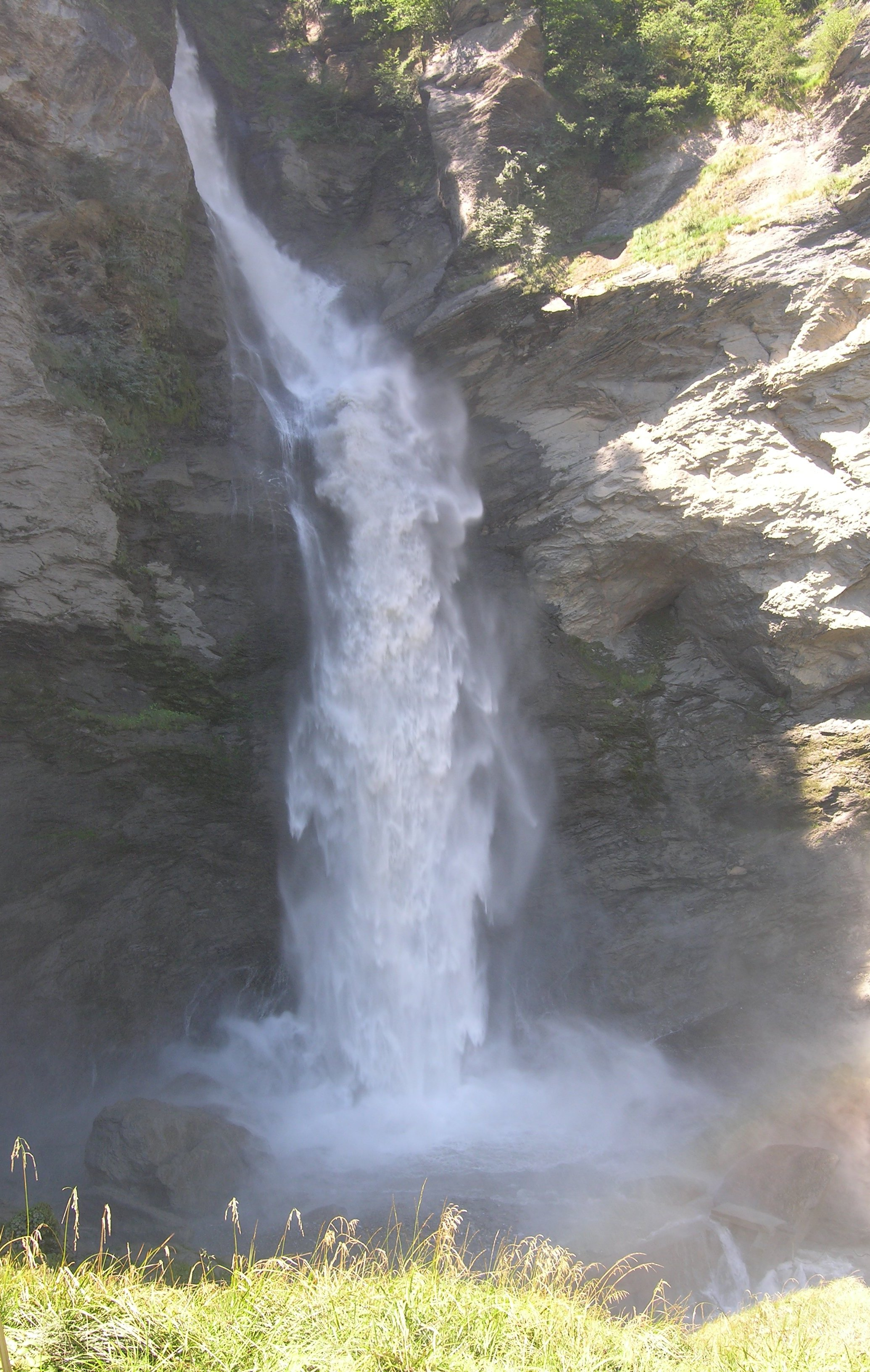
The Reichenbach Falls, near Meiringen, Switzerland

"The Final Problem" was intended to be exactly what its name says. Doyle meant to stop writing about his famous detective after this short story; he felt the Sherlock Holmes stories were distracting him from more serious literary efforts and that "killing" Holmes off was the only way of getting his career back on track. "I must save my mind for better things," he wrote to his mother, "even if it means I must bury my pocketbook with him."

Doyle sought to sweeten the pill by letting Holmes go in a blaze of glory, having him rid the world of a criminal so powerful and dangerous that any further task would be trivial in comparison; indeed, Holmes says as much in the story.

In 1893, Doyle and his wife toured Switzerland and discovered the village of Meiringen in the Bernese Alps. This experience fired Doyle's imagination.

"In 1893 he wrote in his diary, which still exists, that he wanted to kill Sherlock Holmes at the Reichenbach Falls," says Jürg Musfeld, director of the Park Hotel du Sauvage, where Doyle is believed to have stayed during his visit to the village.

== Publication history ==
The story was published in the UK in The Strand Magazine in December 1893, and in the US in McClure's Magazine in the same month. It was also published in the US edition of The Strand Magazine in January 1894. It was published with nine illustrations by Sidney Paget in the Strand, and with eleven illustrations by Harry C. Edwards in McClure's. It was included in The Memoirs of Sherlock Holmes, which was published in December 1893 in the UK and February 1894 in the US.

== Reaction ==
In an article published by the BBC, Jennifer Keishin Armstrong noted that "The public reaction to the death was unlike anything previously seen for fictional events." The Strand Magazine "barely survived" the resulting rush of subscription cancellations. There were some stories that "young men throughout London wore black mourning crêpes on their hats or around their arms for the month of Holmes’ death" although these may have been exaggerations propounded by Doyle's son. Armstrong continues, "Readers typically accepted what went on in their favourite books, then moved on. Now they were beginning to take their popular culture personally, and to expect their favourite works to conform to certain expectations."

Pressure from fans eventually persuaded Doyle to bring Holmes back, writing The Hound of the Baskervilles (set before "The Final Problem") and reviving him in "The Adventure of the Empty House". There were enough holes in eyewitness accounts to allow Doyle to plausibly resurrect Holmes; only the few free surviving members of Moriarty's organisation and Holmes' brother Mycroft (who appears briefly in this story) know that Sherlock Holmes is still alive, having won the struggle at the Reichenbach Falls and that Moriarty was the only one to fall down the Reichenbach—though Holmes was nearly killed at the hands of one of Moriarty's henchmen, Colonel Sebastian Moran.

== Influence and legacy ==
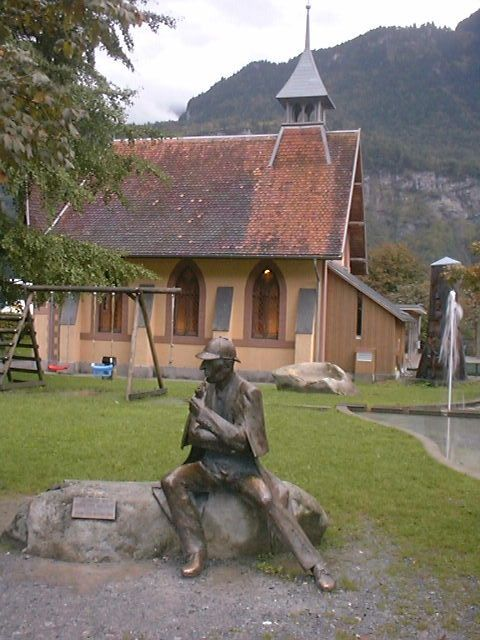
Statue of Holmes outside the English Church, Meiringen

Doyle's work relating to Meiringen has ensured the worldwide fame of their falls, and has continued to promote tourism to the town.

A museum dedicated to Holmes is housed in the basement of the English Church, located in what has now been named Conan Doyle Place.

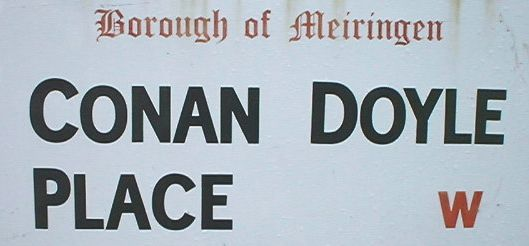
London-style Street sign outside the Sherlock Holmes Museum

At the funicular station near the falls, there is a memorial plate to "the most famous detective in the world".

The actual ledge from which Moriarty fell is on the other side of the falls. It is accessible by climbing the path to the top of the falls, crossing the bridge, and following the trail down the hill. The ledge is marked by a plaque written in English, German, and French. The English inscription reads "At this fearful place, Sherlock Holmes vanquished Professor Moriarty, on 4 May 1891." It is also marked by a large white star so as to be visible from the viewing platform.

Fans who call themselves "pilgrims" travel to Meiringen dressed as characters, both major and minor, from the Holmes stories. There, they take part in a reenactment of the events of "The Final Problem" organized by the Sherlock Holmes Society of London.

== Adaptations ==
=== Film ===
"The Final Problem" was adapted as a 1923 silent short film as part of the Stoll film series, starring Eille Norwood as Holmes and Hubert Willis as Watson, with Percy Standing as Moriarty; the last part of the action is relocated to the Cheddar Gorge in England.

The 1931 film The Sleeping Cardinal, the first film in the 1931–1937 film series starring Arthur Wontner as Holmes, is based in part on "The Adventure of the Empty House" and "The Final Problem." The scene from "The Final Problem" in which Moriarty confronts Holmes at Baker Street and attempts to persuade Holmes to stop his investigations is used in The Triumph of Sherlock Holmes (1935), another film in the series.

In the 1939–1946 film series starring Basil Rathbone as Holmes and Nigel Bruce as Watson, a number of films borrow elements from "The Final Problem". Most noticeable of these elements are the methods of killing Moriarty off; in The Adventures of Sherlock Holmes (1939), Sherlock Holmes and the Secret Weapon (1942) and The Woman in Green (1945), Moriarty is seen in all three films falling from a great height to his death. The Woman in Green contains a variation on the conversation between Holmes and Moriarty in Baker Street, as well as the idea of Moriarty manipulating Watson out of the way by hoaxing an injured Englishwoman who requires his treating.

The 2011 film Sherlock Holmes: A Game of Shadows is based in part on "The Final Problem". However, in the film, the characters are attending a European Peace Conference held near the falls which Moriarty seeks to sabotage, and the two plunge down from a balcony overlooking the falls rather than from the ledge of the original story. Holmes is also shown falling over the edge with Moriarty rather than simply being assumed to have fallen, having been earlier injured trying to defeat Moriarty in a straight fight but knowing that Moriarty will go after Watson if he lives. Holmes survives, by using his brother's oxygen inhaler to survive the water at the bottom of the falls. Later, Watson is shown writing the final sentences of "The Final Problem" on his typewriter, while Holmes, having concealed himself, watches.

=== Television ===
The Soviet television film series The Adventures of Sherlock Holmes and Dr. Watson (1979–1986) adapted "The Final Problem" as "The Deadly Fight" (and "The Adventure in the Empty House" as "Hunt for the Tiger").

In the television series Sherlock Holmes starring Jeremy Brett, the 1985 episode based on the story begins with the theft of the Mona Lisa, masterminded by Moriarty in order to sell prepared fakes to collectors. Holmes recovers the original painting just before Moriarty makes a sale to a "Mr. Morgan". Holmes's interference with his plans convinces Moriarty that the detective must be eliminated, and Holmes is subsequently presumed to have died in a tumble down the Reichenbach Falls. This was the last episode to star David Burke as Dr. Watson. Burke was replaced by Edward Hardwicke until the end of the show's run, starting with the adaptation of "The Empty House" which acted as the first episode of The Return of Sherlock Holmes.

The BraveStarr episode "Sherlock Holmes in the 23rd Century" begins with a revised version of the climax of "The Final Problem", in which only Holmes plummets down Reichenbach Falls, but instead of falling to his doom, he falls into a natural time warp that transports him into the year 2249.

The first episode of the animated television series Sherlock Holmes in the 22nd Century (1999–2001) begins with the climax of "The Final Problem", where it is later revealed in the second episode that while Holmes managed to survive the fall by grabbing a tree branch and would go on to solve many more cases (later being entombed in honey upon his death of old age, which preserved his body enough to be revitalized in the 22nd century), Moriarty had indeed perished and was buried by Holmes himself, preserved in ice in a freezing cave. Holmes, the robotic Watson and Inspector Beth Lestrade later visit the burial site at Reichenbach Falls to confirm Moriarty's death upon news of a lookalike causing a crime spree in New London. Upon seeing a drill hole in the ice, Holmes surmises that the new Moriarty is in fact a clone with all the original's memories and skills.

The two part sixth season finale of Monk, "Mr. Monk is on the Run" (2008), is loosely inspired by both "The Final Problem" and "The Empty House." Adrian Monk is supposedly shot over a pier after being accused of murder, only to be alive in the second part. The orchestrator is revealed to be Dale "the Whale" Biederbeck, described as "the Genghis Khan of world finance," much like Moriarty as "the Napoleon of Crime."

Episode three of the first season of BBC's Sherlock, titled The Great Game shows a variation of the part where Moriarty confronts Holmes at Baker Street in the story. The story is also the basis of the episode "The Reichenbach Fall"(Season 2, Episode 3), which first aired on 15 January 2012 and shows Holmes falling from the roof of St Bartholomew's Hospital in London, supposedly leading to his death. Throughout a confrontation between Sherlock and Jim Moriarty in Baker Street, Moriarty repeatedly utters the phrase "the final problem". The special episode of Sherlock, "The Abominable Bride", which was broadcast on 1 January 2016, featured a re-creation of the showdown between Sherlock and Moriarty set in Victorian times, as depicted in the book. The 2017 series finale of Sherlock is named for this story, but bears little to no resemblance to the canon.

The 2012 series finale of the American medical drama House—which was inspired by the Sherlock Holmes stories—sees Dr. Gregory House fake his own death, in an ode to "The Final Problem".

The 2013 Russian television series Sherlock Holmes adapted "The Final Problem" as "Holmes' Last Case".

The 2018 HBO Asia/Hulu Japan series Miss Sherlock loosely adapts this story for its series finale "The Dock." In this version, the famous scene at the Reichenbach Falls is replaced by an analogous scene set at a fictional "Reichenbach Building" in Tokyo.

The 2019 penultimate episode (Season 7 Episode 12) of the CBS adaptation of Sherlock Holmes, Elementary, was titled "Reichenbach Falls", and portrayed Sherlock's ploy to bring down a powerful serial killer billionaire, Odin Reichenbach. Holmes fakes his death on a bridge, which puts Odin Reichenbach under investigation for the murder of Sherlock Holmes and thereby exposes Reichenbach's past crimes.

The 2024 Indian Television series Shekhar Home remaking the adaptation of the BBC's Sherlock in its last episode also adapts the climax of the story where the titular character Shekhar falls down the Howrah bridge with Jaimini Maurya (James Moriarty).

The 2025 show Watson is another modern adaptation of Holmes, which opens with Watson witnessing the battle between Holmes and Moriarty at the Falls, to the extent that he tries to jump in after his friend, only to suffer a traumatic brain injury and regain consciousness days later. Having opened a clinic using money Holmes left him, Watson later learns that Moriarty has survived, attempting to use Watson's genetic research to further his own schemes, but Watson is able to infect Moriarty with his own virus. The second season reveals that Holmes also survived the confrontation; he reveals that he actually arranged for another adversary, Stapelton, to fight Moriarty in his place while he took the opportunity to fake his death and retire for a time from his role as detective.

=== Radio and audio dramas ===
"The Final Problem" was loosely adapted for multiple episodes of the American radio series The Adventures of Sherlock Holmes starring Richard Gordon as Sherlock Holmes and Leigh Lovell as Dr. Watson, including episodes titled "Murder in the Waxworks" (March 1932), "The Adventure of the Ace of Spades" (May 1932), and "Murder by Proxy" (January 1933).

The story was later adapted for radio by John Kier Cross; it was broadcast on the BBC Light Programme in December 1954 and starred John Gielgud as Holmes and Ralph Richardson as Dr. Watson, with Orson Welles as Professor Moriarty. The production was also broadcast on NBC radio on 17 April 1955.

Felix Felton adapted the story as a radio adaptation which aired on the BBC Home Service in March 1955 as part of the 1952–1969 radio series starring Carleton Hobbs as Holmes and Norman Shelley as Watson, with Ralph Truman as Moriarty. Another dramatisation of the story adapted by Felton aired on the BBC Home Service in November 1957, again starring Hobbs and Shelley, with Felton playing Moriarty. Hobbs and Shelley also starred as Holmes and Watson in a 1967 BBC Light Programme adaptation of the story which was adapted by Michael Hardwick.

"The Final Problem" was dramatized for BBC Radio 4 in 1992 by Bert Coules as part of the 1989–1998 radio series starring Clive Merrison as Holmes and Michael Williams as Watson. It featured Michael Pennington as Professor Moriarty, Frederick Treves as Colonel Moran, Sean Arnold as Inspector Patterson, Terence Edmond as Steiler, Richard Pearce as Jenkinson, and Norman Jones as Sir George.

An episode of The Classic Adventures of Sherlock Holmes, a series on the American radio show Imagination Theatre, combined "The Final Problem" with the events of "The Empty House". The episode, titled "The Return of Sherlock Holmes", aired in 2009, and starred John Patrick Lowrie as Holmes and Lawrence Albert as Watson.

=== Other media ===
William Gillette's 1899 stage play Sherlock Holmes is based on several stories, among them "The Final Problem." Films released in 1916 (starring Gillette as Holmes) and 1922 (starring John Barrymore), both titled Sherlock Holmes, and a 1938 Mercury Theatre on the Air radio adaptation titled The Immortal Sherlock Holmes, starring Orson Welles as Holmes, were based on the play. However, in none of these retellings does Holmes die (and indeed in the two film versions he marries).

In 1975, DC Comics published Sherlock Holmes #1, a comic book that adapted both "The Final Problem" and "The Adventure of the Empty House". It was intended to be an ongoing series, but future issues were canceled due to low sales.

The 1999 comic series The League of Extraordinary Gentlemen, Volume One by Alan Moore and Kevin O'Neill briefly adapts "The Final Problem" in issue #5 and shows Holmes triumphing over Moriarty and climbing the cliff, although Moriarty survives as well. The film adaptation references these events, but does not show them; the novelization copies the event almost verbatim from the graphic novel.

An arc of the Japanese manga series Moriarty the Patriot, a series featuring a young Moriarty as a crime consultant, is named after the Japanese translation of the story's title. The final two episodes, "The Final Problem Act 1" and "The Final Problem Act 2", feature Sherlock and William (Moriarty) falling from Tower Bridge to River Thames, though revealed that both of them are alive and in Switzerland.
