= Canon of Sherlock Holmes =

Things confirmed about Sherlock Holmes in Sir Arthur Conan Doyle's stories

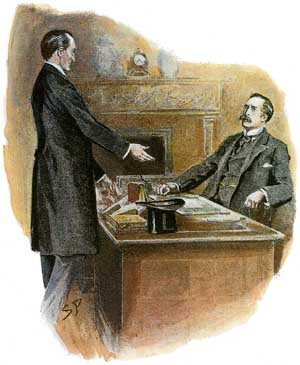
Sherlock Holmes and his biographer Dr John Watson, as depicted in a Sidney Paget drawing in "The Adventure of the Empty House"

Traditionally, the canon of Sherlock Holmes consists of the 56 short stories and four novels written by the British writer and physician Sir Arthur Conan Doyle. In this context, the term "canon" is an attempt to distinguish between Doyle's original works and subsequent works by other authors using the same characters.

Usually capitalised by fans of the Sherlockian game as "the Canon", the description of these 60 adventures as the Sherlock Holmes canon and the game of applying the methods of "Higher Criticism" to it was started by Ronald Knox as a playful use of the traditional definition of "canon" as an authoritative list of books accepted as holy scripture.

== Novels ==
The four novels of the canon:

1. A Study in Scarlet (1887)
2. The Sign of the Four (1890)
3. The Hound of the Baskervilles (1901–1902)
4. The Valley of Fear (1914–1915)

== Short stories ==
The 56 short stories are collected in five books:

1. The Adventures of Sherlock Holmes (1892)
2. The Memoirs of Sherlock Holmes (1894)
3. The Return of Sherlock Holmes (1905)
4. His Last Bow (1917)
5. The Case-Book of Sherlock Holmes (1927)

=== The Adventures of Sherlock Holmes (1892) ===
Published 14 October 1892; contains 12 stories published in The Strand between July 1891 and June 1892 with original illustrations by Sidney Paget.

1. "A Scandal in Bohemia" (July 1891)
2. "The Red-Headed League" (August 1891)
3. "A Case of Identity" (September 1891)
4. "The Boscombe Valley Mystery" (October 1891)
5. "The Five Orange Pips" (November 1891)
6. "The Man with the Twisted Lip" (December 1891)
7. "The Adventure of the Blue Carbuncle" (January 1892)
8. "The Adventure of the Speckled Band" (February 1892)
9. "The Adventure of the Engineer's Thumb" (March 1892)
10. "The Adventure of the Noble Bachelor" (April 1892)
11. "The Adventure of the Beryl Coronet" (May 1892)
12. "The Adventure of the Copper Beeches" (June 1892)

=== The Memoirs of Sherlock Holmes (1894) ===
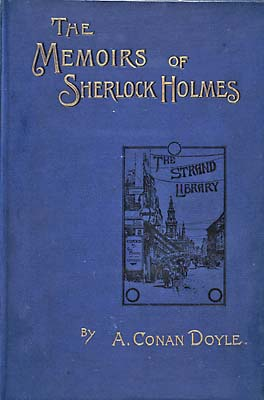
First edition cover of The Memoirs of Sherlock Holmes, published 1894.

Contains 12 stories published in The Strand as further episodes of the Adventures between December 1892 and December 1893 with original illustrations by Sidney Paget (after the magazine publication, Doyle included "The Adventure of the Cardboard Box" only in the His Last Bow collection).

1. "The Adventure of Silver Blaze" (December 1892)
2. "The Adventure of the Cardboard Box" (January 1893)
3. "The Adventure of the Yellow Face" (February 1893)
4. "The Adventure of the Stockbroker's Clerk" (March 1893)
5. "The Adventure of the Gloria Scott" (April 1893)
6. "The Adventure of the Musgrave Ritual" (May 1893)
7. "The Adventure of the Reigate Squire" (June 1893)
8. "The Adventure of the Crooked Man" (July 1893)
9. "The Adventure of the Resident Patient" (August 1893)
10. "The Adventure of the Greek Interpreter" (September 1893)
11. "The Adventure of the Naval Treaty" (October–November 1893)
12. "The Adventure of the Final Problem" (December 1893)

=== The Return of Sherlock Holmes (1905) ===
Contains 13 stories published in The Strand between October 1903 and December 1904 with original illustrations by Sidney Paget.

1. "The Adventure of the Empty House" (October 1903)
2. "The Adventure of the Norwood Builder" (November 1903)
3. "The Adventure of the Dancing Men" (December 1903)
4. "The Adventure of the Solitary Cyclist" (January 1904)
5. "The Adventure of the Priory School" (February 1904)
6. "The Adventure of Black Peter" (March 1904)
7. "The Adventure of Charles Augustus Milverton" (April 1904)
8. "The Adventure of the Six Napoleons" (May 1904)
9. "The Adventure of the Three Students" (June 1904)
10. "The Adventure of the Golden Pince-Nez" (July 1904)
11. "The Adventure of the Missing Three-Quarter" (August 1904)
12. "The Adventure of the Abbey Grange" (September 1904)
13. "The Adventure of the Second Stain" (December 1904)

=== His Last Bow (1917) ===
Contains 7 stories published 1908–1917. Many editions of His Last Bow have eight stories, with "The Adventure of the Cardboard Box" being a part of this collection rather than in The Memoirs of Sherlock Holmes.

1. "The Adventure of Wisteria Lodge" (September-October 1908)
2. "The Adventure of the Red Circle" (March- April 1911)
3. "The Adventure of the Bruce-Partington Plans" (December 1908)
4. "The Adventure of the Dying Detective" (December 1913)
5. "The Disappearance of Lady Frances Carfax" (December 1911)
6. "The Adventure of the Devil's Foot" (December 1910)
7. "His Last Bow. The War Service of Sherlock Holmes" (September 1917)

=== The Case-Book of Sherlock Holmes (1927) ===
Contains 12 stories published 1921–1927.

1. "The Adventure of the Mazarin Stone" (October 1921)
2. "The Problem of Thor Bridge" (February-March 1922)
3. "The Adventure of the Creeping Man" (March 1923)
4. "The Adventure of the Sussex Vampire" (January 1924)
5. "The Adventure of the Three Garridebs" (January 1925)
6. "The Adventure of the Illustrious Client" (February-March 1925)
7. "The Adventure of the Three Gables" (October 1926)
8. "The Adventure of the Blanched Soldier" (November 1926)
9. "The Adventure of the Lion's Mane" (December 1926)
10. "The Adventure of the Retired Colourman" (January 1927)
11. "The Adventure of the Veiled Lodger" (February 1927)
12. "The Adventure of Shoscombe Old Place" (April 1927)

== Extracanonical works ==
Since the author's death, professional and amateur Holmesians have discussed endlessly the expansion of this canon, to include other works by Doyle, including works in other media, into the current complete adventures. Rumours have always surrounded lost works, and in recent years further investigations have revealed more to the traditionally collected canon. As there exists no definitive body to argue what is and what is not canonical beyond the already established novels and stories, it is unlikely that any piece, no matter how good its claim to be "canonical", will ever be popularly received into published versions of the Complete Sherlock Holmes. However, as many as eighteen works have been cited as possible entrants. These works include plays, poems, essays on the character, and even short stories. Published collections of extracanonical works include: Sherlock Holmes: The Published Apocrypha, edited by Jack Tracy; The Final Adventures of Sherlock Holmes, edited by Peter Haining; The Uncollected Sherlock Holmes, edited by Richard Lancelyn Green; and the final volume of Leslie S. Klinger's Sherlock Holmes Reference Library titled The Apocrypha of Sherlock Holmes. These works, each with slightly different contents, discussed several titles and their place in the canon.

=== Noncanonical works by Sir Arthur Conan Doyle ===
In addition to the canon, Doyle wrote (occasionally with a co-writer) a number of vignettes, play adaptations and essays involving Holmes, and two short stories in which Holmes makes a possible cameo appearance. Most were published in various places during his lifetime; another has only come to light since his death. These are listed below with further detail. All these works except the plays are collected in The Final Adventures of Sherlock Holmes edited by Peter Haining.

==== Short stories ====
===== "The Field Bazaar" (1896) =====
"The Field Bazaar" was written for an Edinburgh University fundraising event. Doyle had been requested by his university to contribute a short piece of literature for a charity magazine. In the story, Watson has received a similar request and whilst he reads the letter at breakfast, Holmes correctly deduces the sender of the letter and Watson's thoughts with regard to the letter. It has many similarities with the canonical stories, most notably the metafictional twist in which Watson supplants Doyle as the author publishing his own stories in a magazine. It also plays upon not only the famous skill of Holmes' observations producing apparently miraculous results, but also the notion of the "traditional breakfast scenes" which open many Holmes short stories.

===== "The Story of the Man with the Watches" (1898) =====
Though Doyle had killed off his character in "The Final Problem" (1893), he still wrote other short stories for publication in The Strand Magazine, including "The Story of the Man with the Watches" (published in July 1898, with illustrations by Frank Craig). It was collected in Doyle's Round the Fire Stories (1908) and Tales of Terror and Mystery (1922). The story concerns the appearance of a dead man in a railway carriage, with six pocket watches in his jacket. An explanation is offered by an unnamed "well-known criminal investigator", but the narrator notes that it is flawed, as it doesn't take into account all the facts. A man involved in the accidental murder of the victim writes a letter to the detective, saying that it was a "mighty ingenious" solution but entirely incorrect and continues to share the true events of that day. Some commentators have proposed that the unnamed detective is Holmes. The story shares the same backing for categorising as a Sherlock Holmes story as "The Story of the Lost Special", and appears in French anthologies. The story was adapted for BBC Radio 4 in 2009 as "The Thirteen Watches", in an episode from The Further Adventures of Sherlock Holmes. The story was also adapted for radio in 2012 as "The Addleton Tragedy", an episode of the Imagination Theatre radio series The Further Adventures of Sherlock Holmes.

===== "The Story of the Lost Special" (1898) =====
"The Story of the Lost Special" was published in The Strand Magazine in August 1898. It depicts a seemingly inexplicable mystery in which a special train and its few passengers disappear between two stations. After the mystery is described in full, it is stated that a letter appeared in the press, giving a proposed solution from "an amateur reasoner of some celebrity". As with "The Story of the Man with the Watches", it is possible, and has been proposed by Haining, Tracy, and Green, amongst others that this "amateur reasoner" was Sherlock Holmes. The strongest clue to this is the quotation, "once one has eliminated the impossible...", used by Holmes throughout his deductions. However, this suggested solution is proved wrong by a confession from the organising criminal once he is later arrested for an unrelated crime. Haining suggested that Doyle was "getting out some Holmes" during the series hiatus, but given the failure of the unnamed detective it appears he was parodying his most famous creation. The story was published in book form in Doyle's Round the Fire Stories (1908), and has for years appeared in French editions of the complete adventures.

===== Plot for Sherlock Holmes Story (c. 1900) =====
When searching through Doyle's papers, Hesketh Pearson, a biographer of his, came across a plan for an unwritten story. As Richard Lancelyn Green notes, "there is no evidence to show that it is by [Doyle] and strong internal evidence to suggest that it's not". Various authors have attempted to complete the story (named "The Adventure of the Tall Man" by Peter Haining) and put it alongside the canon. Some are very close to Doyle's plot, others include variations from it. However no 'official' completion has been made (in the same way as The Exploits of Sherlock Holmes was intended as an official continuation of the canon).

===== "How Watson Learned the Trick" (1924) =====
In 1922, several authors were approached to contribute to the library of Queen Mary's Dolls' House. Doyle wrote a short Sherlock Holmes story, just 503 words long, onto the tiny pages of a specially constructed miniature book: "How Watson Learned the Trick". The story was later published alongside works by other authors in The Book of the Queen's Dolls' House Library (1924). Though written 28 years after "The Field Bazaar", this is almost a companion piece to that story. Like "The Field Bazaar", this story is a breakfast scene, during which Watson attempts to mimic Holmes' style in guessing his thoughts. Watson's intuitions are proved wrong, however. Unlike almost all parts of the Sherlock Holmes story it is written in the third person, presumably due to its length.

==== Stageplays ====
===== Angels of Darkness (c. 1889) =====
Unpublished until 2000, this play was written shortly after A Study in Scarlet was published. It is essentially a rewrite of the American chapters of A Study in Scarlet, with the London action moving to San Francisco. Holmes is not present, but Watson is, in a very different form. He acts discreditably and even marries another woman. The publication of this play was at first suppressed, Doyle's biographer, John Dickson Carr stated that it would do no good for the public to read this, a view that Haining endorses readily. The play is notable for its contrasting sensationalist and comic scenes, and it is contained in Klinger's Apocrypha.

===== Sherlock Holmes: A Drama in Four Acts (or Sherlock Holmes) (1899) =====
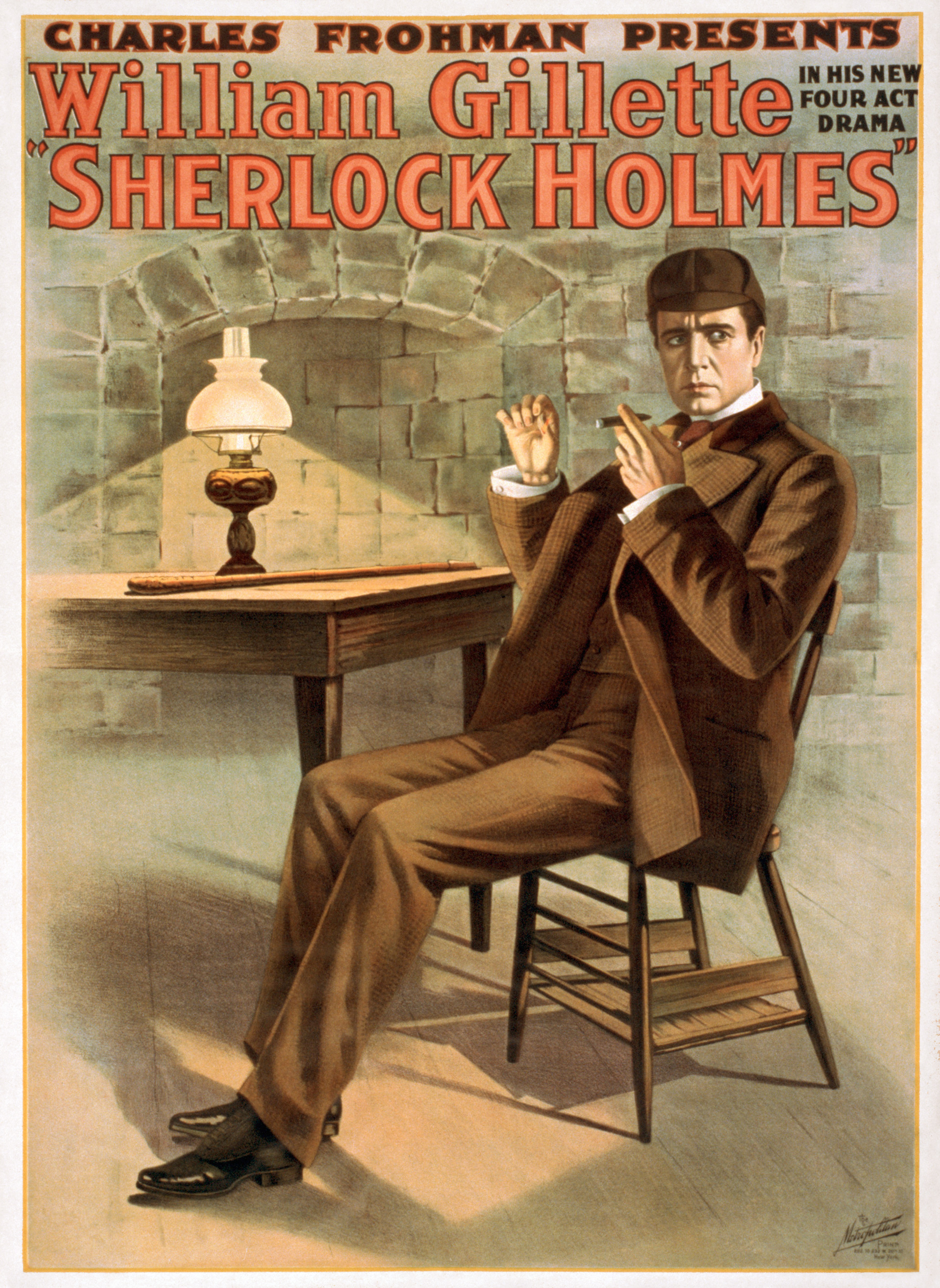
Promotional poster for Sherlock Holmes: A Drama in Four Acts, first performed in 1899.

The original Sherlock Holmes play written by Arthur Conan Doyle and William Gillette had a successful run of over 30 years. It has many original parts which are not found in the short stories but borrows many events from the canonical adventures, namely "A Scandal in Bohemia" and "The Adventure of the Final Problem". Also, it had elements from A Study in Scarlet, The Sign of the Four, "The Boscombe Valley Mystery", "The Adventure of the Greek Interpreter", and "The Adventure of the Naval Treaty". It includes the very first mention of the phrase "Elementary, my dear Watson". While Doyle wrote the original version, it is unclear how much of his material survived in the play as performed, which was written by Gillette. Doyle and Gillette later revised the play together; it has since been revised by others twice.

===== The Speckled Band (or The Stonor Case) (1902) =====
Around 1902, Doyle wrote and produced a play based on his short story "The Adventure of the Speckled Band". It premièred 8 years later, at the Adelphi Theatre, London on 4 June 1910, with H. A. Saintsbury as Sherlock Holmes and Lyn Harding as Dr. Grimesby Roylott. The play, originally entitled The Stonor Case, differs from the story in several small details, such as the names of some of the characters and the timeline is also changed. Holmes mentions Mary Morstan, to whom Dr. Watson is engaged, twice and Charles Augustus Milverton also appears as a character.

===== The Crown Diamond: An Evening With Mr Sherlock Holmes (1921) =====
"The Crown Diamond" is an alternate version of the short story "The Adventure of the Mazarin Stone" though it predates its counterpart by some time. The play was first performed as "Evening with Sherlock Holmes" on 2 May 1921. Sometime during the original run the short story was adapted from the play.

==== Essays and retrospectives ====
Arthur Conan Doyle rarely gave interviews or publicly discussed his character. However, the following is a list of Doyle essays on his character which are currently in publication, either in Green or Haining's book or in standard editions of the Complete Stories:

===== "To An Undiscerning Critic" (1912) =====
Guiterman first published his homage in America in Life (5 December 1912) and then in London Opinion (14 December 1912), and in his collection The Laughing Muse. Doyle's answer appeared in the 26 December 1912 issue of London Opinion and was reprinted in the memoir of the editor of London Opinion, Lincoln Springfield. The late Dean Dickensheet appears to be the first to print the poems together, in An 'Undiscerning Critic' Discerned.

===== "Some Personalia about Mr. Sherlock Holmes" (1917) =====
This essay was featured in The Strand Magazine as a Christmas treat to its readers. It talks of the way Holmes had caught the public imagination and Doyle's view on his character.

===== "The Truth About Sherlock Holmes" (1923) =====
An essay from Collier's Weekly, in which Doyle explains exactly where Holmes came from. It contains, at the end, J. M. Barrie's "The Adventure of the Two Collaborators".

===== "Mr. Sherlock Holmes to His Readers" (1927) =====
This appeared in The Strand Magazine to introduce a competition to name the best Sherlock Holmes adventures. The same essay, with two paragraphs cut, appears as the preface to The Case-Book of Sherlock Holmes.

===== "How I Made My List" (1927) =====
This is the sequel to the article mentioned above. In it, Doyle listed what he thought were the best Holmes adventures. He noted that had he been able to include stories from The Case-Book of Sherlock Holmes he would certainly have included "The Adventure of the Lion's Mane" and "The Adventure of the Illustrious Client". The list is as follows:

1. "The Adventure of the Speckled Band"
2. "The Red-Headed League"
3. "The Adventure of the Dancing Men"
4. "The Adventure of the Final Problem"
5. "A Scandal in Bohemia"
6. "The Adventure of the Empty House"
7. "The Five Orange Pips"
8. "The Adventure of the Second Stain"
9. "The Adventure of the Devil's Foot"
10. "The Adventure of the Priory School"
11. "The Adventure of the Musgrave Ritual"
12. "The Adventure of the Reigate Squire"

Richard Lancelyn Green's The Uncollected Sherlock Holmes also includes five prefaces to the various editions of Sherlock Holmes stories and novels, Doyle's speech at the Stoll Convention Dinner (1921), some chapters from Doyle's autobiography Memoirs and Adventures, and several interviews.

=== Works of interest by other authors ===
These are works which have in the past been thought to have been written by Doyle. Some have been conclusively proved to have no Doyle input, the composition of others still remains unclear.

==== The Exploits of Sherlock Holmes (1954) ====
Cover of The Exploits of Sherlock Holmes, published 1954.

The Exploits of Sherlock Holmes, is a 1954 collection of stories written by Arthur Conan Doyle's son Adrian Conan Doyle and Arthur's biographer, novelist John Dickson Carr. The stories are generally extrapolations of cases briefly mentioned in the canonical work, but tend to contradict themselves and each other. They are generally considered Sherlock Holmes pastiches. The stories contained in the collection are:

1. "The Adventure of the Seven Clocks"
2. "The Adventure of the Gold Hunter"
3. "The Adventure of the Wax Gamblers"
4. "The Adventure of the Highgate Miracle"
5. "The Adventure of the Black Baronet"
6. "The Adventure of the Sealed Room"
7. "The Adventure of Foulkes Rath"
8. "The Adventure of the Abbas Ruby"
9. "The Adventure of the Dark Angels"
10. "The Adventure of the Two Women"
11. "The Adventure of the Deptford Horror"
12. "The Adventure of the Red Widow"

==== Short stories ====
===== "The Case of the Man Who Was Wanted" (c. 1914) =====
This mystery, a completed Sherlock Holmes story, was found in 1942 by a Doyle biographer, Hesketh Pearson, searching through a box of Doyle's papers. It was originally announced that the story would not be published by the Doyle estate, but it was announced it certainly was by Doyle, as the manuscript supposedly appeared in his own handwriting. However, according to Jon L. Lellenberg in Nova 57 Minor, the manuscript was not in Doyle's handwriting, but typewritten. The Strand Magazine published extracts from it in August 1943, and it was finally published after demand from Sherlock Holmes societies in 1947, when it was embraced as a new (if slightly inferior) part of the canon by The Baker Street Irregulars amongst others. Initial suspicions of forgery were reported by Vincent Starret. In September 1945, a letter was received by Hesketh Pearson, a biographer of Sir Arthur. The letter stated, "My pride is not unduly hurt by your remark that 'The Man who was Wanted' is certainly not up to scratch for the sting is much mitigated by your going on to remark that it carries the authentic trade–mark! This, I feel, is a great compliment to my one and only effort at plagiarism." The letter was written by an architect named Arthur Whitaker who had sent the story to Arthur Conan Doyle in 1911 with a suggestion that they publish it as a joint collaboration. Doyle refused, but sent Whitaker a "cheque for ten guineas" in payment for the story. After seeing it attributed to Sir Arthur in the Sunday Dispatch, Whitaker wrote a letter to Denis Conan Doyle explaining the true authorship. Denis forwarded the letter to his brother Adrian, who became angry, demanded proof, and threatened legal action. Whitaker had retained a carbon copy and the Doyles admitted in 1949, after seeing the carbon copy and listening to people who had read it in 1911, that Whitaker was the author. Doyle had bought the story, in the thought that he might use the idea at a later date, but he never did. Pearson, Green, Tracy and the Doyle estate agree that Whitaker wrote the story, though Haining still claims that "the opening scene between Holmes and Watson betrays the hand of the master", and that the story is partly written by Doyle. He points out that Doyle's wife, sons and biographer were fooled by the style, and it is possible there was a redraft made. The story is published in Penguin's The Further Adventures of Sherlock Holmes collection under the title of "The Adventure of the Sheffield Banker."

===== "The Adventure of the Two Collaborators" (first published 1923) =====
Though never claimed by any serious critic to be a Doyle work, this parody is listed here due to a popular misconception that this was written by Doyle for his friend, J. M. Barrie (of Peter Pan fame). Perhaps contributing to this misconception is the fact that the story appears for the first time only in a work of Doyle's, and all subsequent printings are from that source. In fact, this story was written by Barrie for Doyle following a period of the two of them working together on a play, Jane Annie. The story itself involves Doyle and Barrie visiting Holmes, with Doyle killing Holmes due to his irritating intelligence (which perhaps reflects Doyle's killing off of the character in "The Adventure of the Final Problem").

==== Stageplays ====
The Painful Predicament of Mr Sherlock Holmes (1905)

The recognition of William Gillette as Sherlock Holmes was growing as a result of the success of the play Sherlock Holmes. Playing upon his most famous role, this short comedy sketch was performed by Gillette as a curtain raiser to an unrelated play. It involves a mute Sherlock Holmes, and a very talkative client. In Haining and Tracy's books, they speculate as to whether or not this play was written by Arthur Conan Doyle. Certainly Gillette would have needed Doyle's consent to write an original work involving Sherlock Holmes, as the character was under copyright, but it is presumed by most Sherlockians that Gillette wrote the whole thing himself. Haining, however claims that Gillette may have asked Doyle to 'whip up something quickly for him'. However, as no manuscript exists in Doyle's hand, and no reference of the play is left by him, it has been assumed by most that it is little more than a William Gillette curiosity.

== Sequels authorised by the Conan Doyle Estate ==
=== Works authorised by Dame Jean Conan Doyle ===
During the later decades of the 20th century, a number of new works featuring Sherlock Holmes were published with the authorisation of Dame Jean Conan Doyle, the daughter of Arthur Conan Doyle. Following the death of her brother Adrian Conan Doyle in 1970, Jean became her father's literary executor and controlled some of the remaining rights in his works and characters. She was initially reluctant to permit new Sherlock Holmes pastiches, but later gave her approval to selected works which she considered well written and sufficiently faithful to her father's characterisation of Holmes and Watson.

One such work was The New Adventures of Sherlock Holmes, an anthology edited by Martin H. Greenberg and Carol-Lynn Rössel Waugh and first published in 1987. The collection contained fifteen new Holmes stories by mystery writers including Stephen King, John Gardner, Peter Lovesey, Edward D. Hoch, Loren D. Estleman and Dorothy B. Hughes. It was promoted as a centennial edition authorised by the Conan Doyle Estate and was compiled with the approval and consent of Dame Jean Conan Doyle.

Dame Jean also authorised Sherlock Holmes in Orbit (1995), edited by Mike Resnick and Martin H. Greenberg. The anthology contains twenty-six new stories combining Sherlock Holmes with elements of science fiction and fantasy, with stories set in Holmes's own period as well as the present and future. Other collections published with her authorisation included Holmes for the Holidays (1996), an anthology of original Sherlock Holmes stories with Christmas settings or themes.

These authorised pastiches are distinct from the later works described as official sequels authorised by the Conan Doyle Estate, such as Anthony Horowitz's The House of Silk (2011).

=== Caleb Carr ===
In 2005 Caleb Carr, author of The Alienist, published The Italian Secretary, a new Sherlock Holmes novel. This work began as a short story for the 2006 collection The Ghosts in Baker Street: New Tales of Sherlock Holmes, but Carr was given approval by the Doyle estate to expand it into a novel. It is not considered canonical; instead, it is a literary pastiche.

=== Lyndsay Faye ===
In 2009 Lyndsay Faye authored Dust and Shadow which pits Holmes against Jack the Ripper. The book is Faye's first novel and it has the blessing of Conan Doyle's heirs.

=== Anthony Horowitz ===
In 2011, a new Sherlock Holmes novel written by British author Anthony Horowitz was published, entitled The House of Silk, it was the first official sequel authorised by the Conan Doyle Estate. In 2014, a follow-up novel (but not a sequel) entitled Moriarty, was published, also written by Horowitz.

=== Gareth Rubin ===
In April 2024, a new novel Holmes and Moriarty was released by thriller writer Gareth Rubin. It "focuses on Professor Moriarty, the great detective's nemesis". It was authorised by the Conan Doyle Estate.
