= Time After Time =

Time After Time may refer to:

== Film and television ==
- Time After Time (1979 film), an American film based on the Karl Alexander novel (see below)
- Time After Time (1986 film), a British-Australian television film based on the Molly Keane novel (see below)
- Time After Time, a 2011 TV movie featuring Richard Thomas
- Time After Time (2018 film) or Time Freak, an American film by Andrew Bowler
- Time After Time (American TV series), a 2017 series based on the Karl Alexander novel (see below)
- Time After Time (British TV series), a 1993–1995 sitcom starring Brian Conley

Television episodes

- "Time After Time" (Brothers and Sisters), 2010
- "Time After Time" (Grey's Anatomy), 2007
- "Time After Time!" (Pokémon Journeys: The Series), 2020
- "Time After Time" (Supernatural), 2012
- "Time After Time" (The Wire), 2004
- "Time After Time" (Xiaolin Showdown), 2006

== Literature ==
- Time After Time (Alexander novel), a 1979 science fiction novel involving H. G. Wells by Karl Alexander
- Time After Time (Appel novel), a 1985 time travel novel by Allen Appel
- Time After Time, a 1983 novel by Molly Keane
- Time After Time, a 2019 novel by Lisa Grunwald

== Music ==
=== Songs ===
- "Time After Time" (1947 song), a jazz standard by Sammy Cahn and Jule Styne
- "Time After Time" (Cyndi Lauper song), 1984
- "Time After Time" (Elliot Minor song), 2008
- "Time After Time" (Angel song), 2012
- "Time After Time" (Ejae song), 2026
- "Time After Time (Hana Mau Machi de)", by Mai Kuraki, 2003
- "Time After Time", by the Beloved from Happiness, 1990
- "Time After Time", by Electric Light Orchestra from Secret Messages, 1983
- "Time After Time", by Estelle from True Romance, 2015
- "Time After Time", by Lauv from All 4 Nothing, 2022
- "Time After Time", by Ozzy Osbourne from No More Tears, 1991
- "Time After Time", by Paul Revere and the Raiders from Hard 'N' Heavy (with Marshmallow), 1969
- "Time After Time", by R.E.M. from Reckoning, 1984
- "Time After Time", by SM Town from 2022 Winter SM Town: SMCU Palace, 2022
- "Time After Time", by Toni Basil from Word of Mouth, 1981

=== Albums ===
- Time After Time (Chris Montez album), 1966
- Time After Time (Etta James album), 1995
- Time After Time (Eva Cassidy album), 2000
- Time After Time (Oscar Peterson album), 1986
- Time After Time (Timmy T album), 1990
- Time After Time, by Crumbächer, 1992
- Time After Time, by Jake Mathews, 2004
