= The Return of the Pharaoh =

Sherlock Holmes pastiche novel

- First edition
- Author: Nicholas Meyer
- Language: English
- Genre: Mystery novels
- Publisher: Minotaur Books
- Publication date: November 2021
- Publication place: United States
- Media type: Print (Hardback
- ISBN: 9781250788207 (first edition, hardback)
- Preceded by: The Adventure of the Peculiar Protocols
- Followed by: Sherlock Holmes and the Telegram from Hell

The Return of the Pharaoh: From the Reminiscences of John H. Watson, M.D. is a Sherlock Holmes pastiche novel by Nicholas Meyer, published in 2021. It takes place after Meyer's other Holmes pastiches, The Seven-Per-Cent Solution, The West End Horror, The Canary Trainer and The Adventure of the Peculiar Protocols.

== Reception ==
Kirkus Reviews praised the "rousing adventure" but conceded that "the climactic revelation of the murderer will catch some readers sheepishly admitting that they'd forgotten there was a mystery to be solved". Publishers Weekly found the book "disappointing" and said "Fans of the author's creative reimaginings of Conan Doyle's characters will hope for a return to form next time." The Associated Press praised the novel, saying it "blends old with new, giving readers familiar stories with parallels to and hints of more modern takes".
