= The Seven-Per-Cent Solution =

1974 mystery novel by Nicholas Meyer

- US first edition
- Author: Nicholas Meyer
- Language: English
- Genre: Mystery novels
- Publisher: E. P. Dutton
- Publication date: 1974
- Publication place: United States
- Media type: Print (hardback & paperback)
- ISBN: 0-525-20015-0 (first edition, hardback)
- Followed by: The West End Horror

The Seven-Per-Cent Solution: Being a Reprint from the Reminiscences of John H. Watson, M.D. is a 1974 novel by American writer Nicholas Meyer. It is written as a pastiche of a Sherlock Holmes adventure, and was made into a film of the same name in 1976.

Published as a "lost manuscript" of the late Dr. John H. Watson, the book recounts Holmes' recovery from cocaine addiction (with the help of Sigmund Freud) and his subsequent prevention of a European war through the unravelling of a sinister kidnapping plot. It was followed by six other Holmes pastiches by Meyer, The West End Horror (1976), The Canary Trainer (1993), The Adventure of the Peculiar Protocols (2019), The Return of the Pharaoh (2021), Sherlock Holmes and the Telegram from Hell (2024), and Sherlock Holmes and the Real Thing (2025), none of which have been adapted to film.

The Seven-Per-Cent Solution was ranked ninth in the Publishers Weekly list of bestselling novels from 1974 and made The New York Times Best Seller list for forty weeks between September 15, 1974, and June 22, 1975.

== Plot ==
An introduction states that two canonical Holmes adventures were fabrications. These are "The Final Problem", in which Holmes apparently died along with Prof. James Moriarty, and "The Empty House", wherein Holmes reappeared after a three-year absence and revealed that he had not been killed after all. The Seven-Per-Cent Solution's Watson explains that they were published to conceal the truth concerning Holmes' "Great Hiatus".

The novel begins in 1891, when Holmes first informs Watson of his belief that Professor James Moriarty is a "Napoleon of Crime". The novel presents this view as nothing more than the fevered imagining of Holmes' cocaine-sodden mind and further asserts that Moriarty was the childhood mathematics tutor of Sherlock and his brother Mycroft. Watson meets Moriarty, who denies that he is a criminal and reluctantly threatens to pursue legal action unless the latter's accusations cease. Moriarty also refers to a "great tragedy" in Holmes' childhood, but refuses to explain further when pressed by Watson.

The heart of the novel consists of an account of Holmes' recovery from his addiction. Knowing that Sherlock would never willingly see a doctor about his addiction and mental problems, Watson and Holmes' brother Mycroft induce Holmes to travel to Vienna, where Watson introduces him to Dr. Freud. Using a treatment consisting largely of hypnosis, Freud helps Holmes shake off his addiction and his delusions about Moriarty, but neither he nor Watson can revive Holmes' dejected spirit.

What finally does the job is a whiff of mystery: one of the doctor's patients is kidnapped and Holmes' curiosity is sufficiently aroused. The case takes the three men on a breakneck train ride across Austria in pursuit of a foe who is about to launch a war involving all of Europe. Holmes remarks during the denouement that they have succeeded only in postponing such a conflict, not preventing it; Holmes would later become involved in a "European War" in 1914.

One final hypnosis session reveals a key traumatic event in Holmes' childhood: his father murdered his mother and her lover. Moriarty told Sherlock about the murder. From that point on, his onetime tutor became a dark and malignant figure in Holmes' subconscious. Freud and Watson conclude that Holmes, consciously unable to face the emotional ramifications of this event, has pushed them deep into his unconscious while finding outlets in fighting evil, pursuing justice, and many of his famous eccentricities, including his cocaine habit. However, they decide not to discuss these subjects with Holmes, believing that he would not accept them, and that it would needlessly complicate his recovery.

Watson returns to London, but Holmes decides to travel alone for a while, advising Watson to claim that he had been killed, and thus the famed "Great Hiatus" is more or less preserved. It is during these travels that the events of Meyer's sequel The Canary Trainer occur.

== Publication history ==
During the 1973 scriptwriters strike, Nicholas Meyer needed a project to occupy his time. Meyer developed an interest in Sherlock Holmes as a teenager and off-and-on over the years had given thought to authoring a story where Sherlock Holmes meets Sigmund Freud, having learned of the founder of psychoanalysis from his psychiatrist father. The strike was the impetus to settle into developing the various ideas he had over the years into a book.

Meyer wrote the book in longhand and then typed it up feeling that this better put him in the mindset of "editing" Watson's words. He added deliberate continuity errors and mistakes to better provide the illusion of being an extension of the original works.

== References to other works ==
Holmes's addiction to cocaine is developed out of the opening scene of Conan Doyle's The Sign of Four. In that scene, Holmes describes the cocaine with which he is injecting himself as "a seven-per-cent solution".

In his Introduction, Meyer's Watson declares that "The Lion's Mane", "The Mazarin Stone", "The Creeping Man" and "The Three Gables" (all Arthur Conan Doyle-written adventures from 1927's The Case-Book of Sherlock Holmes) are forged "drivel". "The Creeping Man" has been accused of resembling a science-fiction tale more than a Holmes adventure, "The Mazarin Stone" is often viewed as an awkward adaptation of a theatrical script by Doyle and some have objected to a racist characterization in "The Three Gables". "The Lion's Mane", while perhaps less controversial than the other tales, is notable for being one of the canon's two stories narrated by Holmes. Meyer's Watson also states that other forgeries exist, though whether canonical works are concerned is not specified.

On the train to Vienna, Holmes and Watson briefly meet Rudolf Rassendyll, the fictional protagonist of the 1894 novel The Prisoner of Zenda, returning from his adventures in Ruritania.

== Adaptations ==
=== Film ===
The story was adapted for the screen in 1976 in a Universal Studios production, directed by Herbert Ross, scripted by Meyer and designed by James Bond veteran Ken Adam. The all-star cast featured Nicol Williamson as Holmes, Robert Duvall as Watson, Alan Arkin as Dr. Sigmund Freud, with Laurence Olivier as Moriarty, Charles Gray as Mycroft Holmes (the role he reprised in the Jeremy Brett TV series), Samantha Eggar as Mary Watson, Vanessa Redgrave as Lola Devereaux, Joel Grey as Lowenstein, and Jeremy Kemp as Baron von Leinsdorf and Williamson's then wife Jill Townsend playing his character's mother (Mrs. Holmes). The film was made at Pinewood Studios with location shooting in the UK and Austria (including the Austrian National Library); the tennis match/duel between Freud and von Leinsdorf was filmed on one of the historic real tennis courts at the Queen's Club in West Kensington, London.

Meyer adapted his novel to screenplay form, but the film differs significantly from the novel, mainly by supplementing the book's Austrian baron-villain (played by Jeremy Kemp) with an older Turkish foe. Also, the film departs from traditional Holmes canon in portraying the detective as light-haired instead of the traditional black-haired, and as a somewhat flirtatious Holmes at that (Doyle's hero never let women see any signs of interest). Furthermore, the traumatic revelation that affected Holmes in his childhood is heightened – the final hypnosis therapy reveals that Sherlock witnessed his mother's murder by his father. Finally, the lady whom Holmes saves in the story's climactic chase, Lola Devereaux, appears on his ship as he departs for his sabbatical with the purpose of joining him and Holmes eagerly accepts the offer. Meyer's three Holmes novels are much more faithful to the original stories in these regards.

=== Radio ===
The story was dramatised for radio by Denny Martin Flinn. The adaptation aired on BBC Radio 4 on 9 January 1993 and was rebroadcast on BBC Radio 4 Extra in 2025. It was directed by Jane Morga, with Simon Callow as Sherlock Holmes, Ian Hogg as Dr Watson, Karl Johnson as Sigmund Freud, David King as Professor Moriarty, Philip Voss as Mycroft Holmes, Matthew Morgan as Baron von Leinsdorf, Melinda Walker as Nancy Osborn Slater, Geraldine Fitzgerald as Baroness von Leinsdorf, and Wolf Kahler as Hugo von Hoffmansthal. The radio adaptation was more faithful to the novel than the film adaptation.

=== Comics ===
In 2015 IDW Publishing released a five-issue, comics miniseries adapation of the novel adapted by writers David and Scott Tipton, with art by Ron Joseph. It holds a 7.9 out of 10 critics' rating on the review aggregator website Comic Book Round Up.
