= The Adventure of the Peculiar Protocols =

2019 novel by Nicholas Meyer

- First edition
- Author: Nicholas Meyer
- Language: English
- Genre: Mystery novels
- Publisher: Minotaur Books
- Publication date: October 2019
- Publication place: United States
- Media type: Print (Hardback
- ISBN: 9781250228956 (first edition, hardback)
- Preceded by: The Canary Trainer
- Followed by: The Return of the Pharaoh

The Adventure of the Peculiar Protocols: Adapted from the Journals of John H. Watson, M.D. is a Sherlock Holmes pastiche novel by Nicholas Meyer, published in 2019. It takes place after Meyer's other Holmes pastiches, The Seven-Per-Cent Solution, The West End Horror, and The Canary Trainer. It is Meyer's first Holmes pastiche in 26 years.

The story has Holmes debunk The Protocols of the Elders of Zion. As with Meyer's other pastiches, the novel features Holmes meeting real-life historical personages such as Constance Garnett, Israel Zangwill and Chaim Weizmann.

The book made the bestseller list of The Los Angeles Times in November 2019.

== Reception ==
Kirkus Reviews found the mystery "slight" and said of the purportedly previously undiscovered adventure "that [it] might just as well have stayed hidden". Publishers Weekly said that "Meyer cleverly plays with his audience's expectations" and posited that Sherlockians would want a shorter wait for Meyer's next adventure. Joseph Goodrich of Mystery Scene positively reviewed the novel calling it a "a masterful concoction" and "an effective thriller, rich in atmosphere and period detail". The Washington Post reviewer Michael Dirda felt that the book has some "fine Sherlockian flourishes" but ultimately "the novel often feels talky and perhaps unavoidably somber and portentous".
