= Time After Time (American TV series) =

2017 American television series

- Genre: Drama; Science fiction
- Based on: Time After Time by Karl Alexander
- Developed by: Kevin Williamson
- Starring: Freddie Stroma; Josh Bowman; Genesis Rodriguez; Nicole Ari Parker; Jennifer Ferrin; Will Chase
- Theme music composer: John Frizzell; Jeff Russo
- Composer: Jeff Russo
- Country of origin: United States
- Original language: English
- No. of seasons: 1
- No. of episodes: 12

Production
- Executive producers: Marcos Siega; Kevin Williamson
- Producers: Lauren Warner; Michael Stricks; Jeffrey T. Bernstein
- Production locations: Silvercup Studios East, Long Island City, Queens, New York
- Cinematography: John Lindley; David Insley
- Editors: Rosanne Tan; Viet Nguyen; Vincent Tabaillon; Shelly Westerman
- Running time: 43 minutes
- Production companies: Outerbanks Entertainment; Warner Bros. Television

Original release
- Network: ABC (episodes 1–5); AXN (episodes 6–12)
- Release: March 5 – March 26, 2017

Time After Time is an American period drama/science fiction television series that aired on ABC from March 5 to March 26, 2017. The series, developed by Kevin Williamson, is based on the 1979 novel of the same name by Karl Alexander and was commissioned on May 12, 2016. ABC removed the series from its schedule after broadcasting five episodes. All twelve episodes were broadcast in Spain, Portugal, South Africa and Australia, and all streamed on CW Seed.

== Cast ==
- Freddie Stroma as H. G. Wells, a 19th-century author and intellectual who invented a time machine and travels to 2017 to capture John.
- Josh Bowman as John Stevenson/Jack the Ripper, a London surgeon and Wells's friend who is secretly a notorious serial killer, and escapes, using Wells's time machine, to 2017.
- Genesis Rodriguez as Jane Walker, assistant curator of the New York Metropolitan Museum.
- Nicole Ari Parker as Vanessa Anders, a wealthy philanthropist and Wells's great-great-granddaughter.
- Jennifer Ferrin as Brooke Monroe, a neuropathologist with an interest in Stevenson.
- Will Chase as Griffin Monroe, a politician romantically involved with Vanessa Anders, who has a secret agenda regarding Wells's time machine. He is Brooke Monroe's brother.
- Frances Turner as Courtney Anders

== Episodes ==
With the exception of the pilot, each episode is named after a phrase in the song "Time After Time" by Cyndi Lauper, which was named after the 1979 film of the same name. The film itself was based on the novel of the same name used as the source material of the series.

No.	Title	Directed by	Written by	Original release date	Prod. code	US viewers (millions)
1	"Pilot"	Marcos Siega	Story by : Karl Alexander & Steve Hayes; Teleplay by : Nicholas Meyer	March 5, 2017	T15.10134	2.54
H. G. Wells hosts a dinner party in his Victorian England home in 1893. He shows his guests his time machine, which they do not believe is functional. The police arrive looking for John Stevenson, having learned Stevenson may be the infamous Jack the Ripper. Stevenson escapes in Wells' time machine but the machine returns because he does not have the key. Wells follows Stevenson to March 3, 2017. His machine is now in a New York museum and his appearance is brushed off as a prank. He meets Jane Walker, a museum employee, and spends the night in her apartment after being injured by taxi while pursung Stevenson. Wells takes Jane three days into the future to prove the existence of time travel. While in the future, they discover Jane is Stevenson's third victim. They return to the present to prevent his killing a second victim. They are successful but, Stevenson abducts Jane. He demands Wells to give him the key in exchange for her life.
2	"I Will Catch You"	Marcos Siega	Kevin Williamson	March 5, 2017	T13.20352	2.54
Wells meets Vanessa Anders, the museum manager. She reveals she is Wells' great-great-granddaughter, having known about the time machine because he visited her when she was in college. Vanessa gives Wells a letter from his future self to prove this. Wells is worried that the letter contains so little information because something bad will happen. Stevenson calls and demands the key be given him the following afternoon in Central Park. Stevenson keeps Jane by threatening to kill another hostage. At Central Park, Wells almost gives Stevenson the key but Vanessa's men ambush him, but he escapes before revealing Jane's location. Stevenson takes Jane to the museum and Wells gives him the key. Stevenson attempts to flee to another time, but Wells stops him and retrieves the key; Stevenson escapes, afterward calling and threatening to kill someone every day until Wells relinquishes the key. Stevenson takes his next victim while at a bar. Meanwhile, a mysterious unknown man takes photos of him and then returns to an apartment where an entire wall contains information on Wells and Stevenson.
3	"Out of Time"	Steve Shill	Gabrielle Stanton	March 12, 2017	T13.20353	2.26
Stevenson continues threatening against Wells and Jane, demanding the key. Wells attempts to fix the time machine while Vanessa is meeting a reporter for an interview for her boyfriend Griffin's senate campaign. John meets a neurologist named Brooke, whom he sleeps with before she knocks him out. Regaining consciousness, he discovers he is strapped to a table. Brooke reveals she knows he is Jack the Ripper from 1893. The mysterious man from the previous episode visits his sick mother, telling her that Stevenson and Wells are in 2017. She says to stop them from whatever experience she had with them. Wells and Jane fix the time machine. When Vanessa tells Griffin about H.G., Griffin later calls someone unknown, who has prior knowledge of the time machine.
4	"Secrets Stolen"	Tim Andrew	Karen Wyscarver & Sanford Golden	March 19, 2017	T13.20354	1.79
Stevenson awakens in Brooke's laboratory. While she helps him recover from being drugged, he attempts to attack her. Wells is trying to navigate the Internet when Jane joins him in the ballroom. Doug and Vanessa arrive with information about Chad, including his full name and address. Doug take Wells and Jane to the apartment to investigate. Vanessa and Griffin discuss Wells, the time machine, and a fundraiser she is holding for Griffin's campaign that evening at the mansion. With Martin Scott's help, Wells and Jane find out that the coordinates on the note from Chad's apartment are for Glen Cove, Long Island and include the date and time - 15 September 1980, 1:42pm. They use the time machine to travel there and they discover that Robert Holland's murder was covered up. When Jane goes to get her phone to contact a colleague who can help with learning about Project Utopia, she runs into Stevenson as he sneaks around the mansion. She hits him with her purse and raises the alarm. Stevenson stabs a guard and runs off. When Griffin uses his stolen access card to enter the ballroom, Stevenson attacks him from behind. They fight but Stevenson puts him out and manages to activate the time machine. The time machine returns to the ballroom a second later but it is empty. Stevenson has traveled to Paris, 30 March 1918.
5	"Picture Fades"	Marcos Siega	Daniel T. Thomsen	March 26, 2017	T13.20355	1.87
Wells and Jane determine that Stevenson has traveled to 1918 in order to save his son, Henry Ayers, who died during a transport on March 30. Wells decides to follow Stevenson to stop him from changing events in time. Meanwhile, Brooke heals Griffin's wound using one of their father's experiments. Afterwards, Brooke shows him an advanced experiment where she has given a man the strength of six men. Trying to figure out anything about Project Utopia, Vanessa turns to Dr. Cedric Myers, a former co-worker of her father's, who at first is reluctant to give her information, but eventually decides to. Before he can, Brooke has one of her men electrocute him, passing it off as a heart attack. Stevenson is successful in saving Henry, but Jane soon realizes that Henry now dies outside of a cafe, along with Wells. She travels to 1918 to save Wells, but Stevenson finds her and takes her to the cafe, where they see Henry and Wells. The cafe is then bombed, leaving Wells and many others injured. Henry tries to save people still inside the cafe, despite Stevenson's attempt to stop him, but ultimately Henry dies in the fire. Jane forces Stevenson to save Wells as they travel back to 2017. Wells is nursed back to health as he and Jane confess their love for one another. Vanessa has her guards lock Stevenson in her basement just before looking through the files she took from Myers' home which reveal that Stevenson was a test subject in Project Utopia.
6	"Caught Up in Circles"	Michael A. Allowitz	Dewayne Jones	June 20, 2017 (AXN)	T13.20356	N/A
After Wells recovers, he informs Vanessa that her father not only stole Project Utopia, but also murdered Robert Holland in 1980. Wells and Jane then visit a former nurse, Phyllis Johnson, who was involved with Project Utopia. Phyllis reveals that she worked for a Dr. Monroe, Brooke and Griffin's father, that she is currently being treated by Brooke, and that Wells' novel The Island of Dr. Moreau is about her. Phyllis' caregiver is instructed by Brooke to kill Wells and Jane shortly after they arrive, but fails as the two head back to Vanessa's home. Meanwhile, Brooke and Griffin attempt to steal the time machine, Wells, and Stevenson, using two of her men. Griffin is able to copy information about the time machine, but the computer programmer sends himself and the time machine to an undisclosed location before the machine could be stolen. Brooke and her men free Stevenson, but he escapes and kills one of the men. For leverage against the time machine, Brooke kidnaps Vanessa. Once Griffin learns this, he gets in an argument with Brooke, eventually deciding to not help her anymore. Jane looks for clues in The Island of Dr. Moreau while Wells and Stevenson devise a plan to save Vanessa.
7	"Suitcases of Memories"	Allison Anders	Kai Yu Wu	July 6, 2017 (AXN)	T13.20357	N/A
8	"If You're Lost"	Marcos Siega	Brian Millikin	July 13, 2017 (AXN)	T13.20358	N/A
9	"You Will Find Me"	Julie Plec	Mary Leah Sutton	July 20, 2017 (AXN)	T13.20359	N/A
10	"Turned to Gray"	Mark Tonderai	Gabrielle Stanton	July 27, 2017 (AXN)	T13.20360	N/A
11	"I Fall Behind"	Rob Seidenglanz	Bayan Wolcott	August 7, 2017 (AXN)	T13.20361	N/A
12	"The Second Hand Unwinds"	Marcos Siega	Kevin Williamson	August 30, 2017 (AXN)	T13.20362	N/A

== Reception ==
The series has received mixed reviews from critics. The review aggregator website Rotten Tomatoes reported a 67% approval rating with an average rating of 6.29/10 based on 30 reviews. The website's consensus reads, "Time After Time employs its central narrative gimmick to ill effect, leaving a charming cast stranded in a stream of tedious storylines." Metacritic, which uses a weighted average, assigned a score of 59 out of 100 based on 24 reviews, indicating "mixed or average reviews".

Sonia Saraiya, writing in Variety, felt that despite an engaging lead performance the series failed to live up to its "fun" potential, and raised strident objections to its style of violence: "the studied shallowness of Time After Time’s approach to violence makes for a sickening dynamic that attempts to cheaply humanize a serial killer. And while a shallow look at violence might be all that broadcast television’s standards and practices will allow, it feels both flat and exploitative."

Viewership and ratings per episode of Time After Time
No.	Title	Air date	Rating/share (18–49)	Viewers (millions)	DVR (18–49)	DVR viewers (millions)	Total (18–49)	Total viewers (millions)
1	"Pilot"	March 5, 2017	0.7/2	2.54	TBD	TBD	TBD	TBD
2	"I Will Catch You"	March 5, 2017	0.7/2	2.54	TBD	TBD	TBD	TBD
3	"Out of Time"	March 12, 2017	0.6/2	2.26	TBD	TBD	TBD	TBD
4	"Secrets Stolen"	March 19, 2017	0.4/2	1.79	0.3	0.93	0.7	2.72
5	"Picture Fades"	March 26, 2017	0.4/2	1.87	0.3	—N/a	0.7	—N/a

== See also ==
- The Time Machine, 1895 novella by H. G. Wells
