= The Exploits of Sherlock Holmes =

1954 short story collection by Adrian Conan Doyle

- First edition cover (UK)
- Author: Adrian Conan Doyle and John Dickson Carr
- Language: English
- Genre: Detective fiction
- Publisher: Random House (US); John Murray (UK)
- Publication date: 1954
- Publication place: United Kingdom
- Media type: Print (hardcover)
- Pages: 313

The Exploits of Sherlock Holmes is a short story collection of twelve Sherlock Holmes pastiches, first published in 1954. It was written by Adrian Conan Doyle, who was the son of Sir Arthur Conan Doyle (the creator of Sherlock Holmes), and by John Dickson Carr, who was the authorised biographer of the elder Conan Doyle. The first six stories were written in collaboration by the two writers, while the last six stories were written solely by Adrian Conan Doyle.

Each story in this collection is postscripted with a quote from one of the original Sherlock Holmes stories, making reference to an undocumented Holmes case that inspired it.

== Writing ==
In 1945, Sir Arthur Conan Doyle's son, Adrian Conan Doyle, began a collaboration with his father's biographer, John Dickson Carr, to publish twelve new exploits of Sherlock Holmes and Watson (of which one appeared in Life magazine and the other eleven stories were published in Collier's magazine) based on cases that had been referred to in passing in the four canonical novels and 56 original short stories of Sherlock Holmes, but which had never been written up by Watson (see the below mentioned postscripts found at the end of each of the twelve new exploits).

The first story was illustrated by Adolf Hallman in Life, and the other stories were illustrated by Robert Fawcett in Collier's. In 1954, the collection was published by Random House, New York, with illustrations by Jerome Kuhl and a jacket illustration by Jules Gotlieb. It was published in the same year by John Murray, London.

The collaboration was not smooth, as Douglas G. Greene relates in John Dickson Carr: The Man Who Explained Miracles. There is some doubt about who wrote what—though at times Carr's highly recognisable style breaks through the convention of pastiching the original Conan Doyle stories. In any case, the book published in 1954 was not a great success at the time, though collectors take an interest in it, and the experiment of writing more new Sherlock Holmes exploits was not repeated by these two writers.

In 1963 John Murray published two paperback volumes which divided the stories into The Exploits of Sherlock Holmes by Adrian Conan Doyle and More Exploits of Sherlock Holmes by Adrian Conan Doyle and John Dickson Carr. The first title contains the last six stories listed below, the second the first six. Greene suggests that authorship may be more complex.

== Stories ==
The stories contained in the collection are:

- "The Adventure of the Seven Clocks" - post-scripted as "The Case of the Trepoff Murder" mentioned in "A Scandal in Bohemia"
- "The Adventure of the Gold Hunter" - post-scripted as "The Camberwell Poisoning Case" mentioned in "The Five Orange Pips"
- "The Adventure of the Wax Gamblers" - post-scripted from "The Case of the Darlington Substitution Scandal" mentioned in "A Scandal in Bohemia" (however, this exploit is not the one mentioned in the Doyle story, but is instead a second one. It does refer to the previous one, though.)
- "The Adventure of the Highgate Miracle" - post-scripted as "The Tale of Mr. James Phillimore" mentioned in "The Problem of Thor Bridge"
- "The Adventure of the Black Baronet" - post-scripted as the affair of "The Unfortunate Madame Montpensier" mentioned in "The Hound of the Baskervilles"
- "The Adventure of the Sealed Room" - post-scripted as the case of "Colonel Warburton's Madness" mentioned in "The Adventure of the Engineer's Thumb"
- "The Adventure of Foulkes Rath" - post-scripted as the account of "The Addleton Tragedy" mentioned in "The Adventure of the Golden Pince-Nez"
- "The Adventure of the Abbas Ruby" - post-scripted as the affair of "The Famous Card Scandal of the Nonpareil Club" mentioned in "The Hound of the Baskervilles"
- "The Adventure of the Dark Angels" - post-scripted as "The Case of the Ferrers" mentioned in "The Adventure of the Priory School"
- "The Adventure of the Two Women" - post-scripted as "The Scandal of the Blackmailer" mentioned in "The Hound of the Baskervilles"
- "The Adventure of the Deptford Horror" - post-scripted as two cases "The Sudden Death of Cardinal Tosca" and "Wilson the Notorious Canary-trainer" mentioned in "The Adventure of Black Peter"
- "The Adventure of the Red Widow" - post-scripted as "The Arnsworth Castle Business" mentioned in "A Scandal in Bohemia"

=== The Adventure of the Seven Clocks ===
The Adventure of the Seven Clocks was first published in Life on 29 December 1952, with illustrations by Adolf Hallman.

==== Plot ====
Holmes is consulted by a young lady, a companion to an older woman, about the eccentric behavior of a young man she has met. He behaves normally, but becomes a raging maniac whenever he encounters a clock. The young woman personally has seen him smash two clocks and heard from the man's servant of five other incidents. Holmes must travel to a distant seaport to gather information to resolve a horrible, terrorist scheme and solve the mystery of the aberrant behavior.
