= Nicholas Meyer =

American screenwriter, producer, author, and director (born 1945)

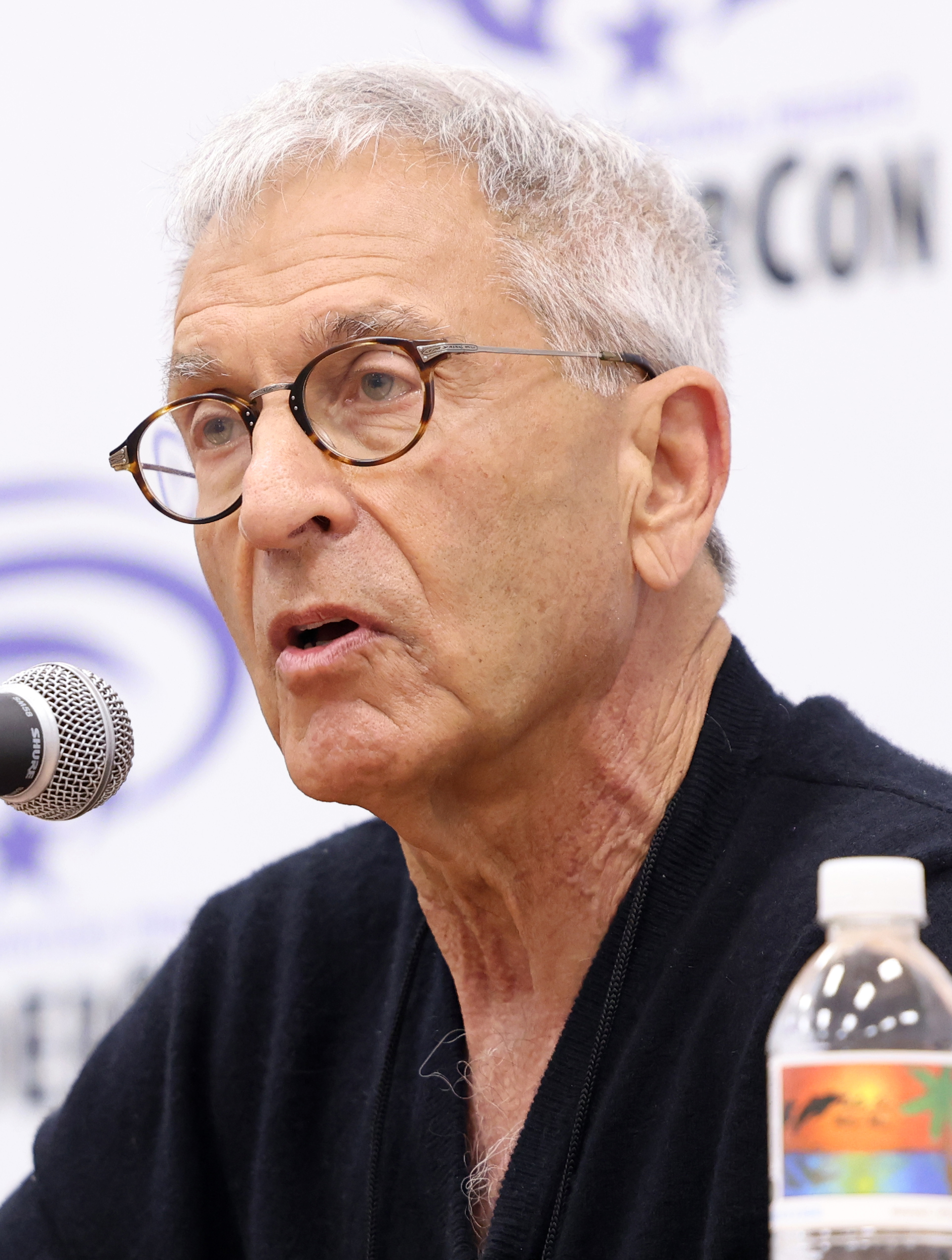
- Meyer in 2025
- Born: December 24, 1945 (age 80); New York City, U.S.
- Education: University of Iowa
- Occupations: Screenwriter; film producer; film director; novelist
- Children: 2, including Dylan Meyer
- Relatives: Kristen Stewart (daughter-in-law)
- Website: nicholas-meyer.com

Nicholas Meyer (born December 24, 1945) is an American screenwriter, director and author known for his best-selling novel The Seven-Per-Cent Solution, and for directing the films Time After Time, two of the Star Trek feature films, the 1983 television film The Day After, and the 1999 HBO original film Vendetta.

Meyer was nominated for an Academy Award for Best Adapted Screenplay for the film The Seven-Per-Cent Solution (1976), where he adapted his own novel into a screenplay. He has also been nominated for a Satellite Award, three Emmy Awards, and has won four Saturn Awards. He appeared as himself during the 2017 On Cinema spinoff series The Trial, during which he testified about Star Trek and San Francisco.

== Early life ==
Meyer was born in New York City to a Jewish family. He is the son of Bernard Constant Meyer (1910–1988), a Manhattan psychiatrist and psychoanalyst, and his first wife, concert pianist Elly (died 1960; née Kassman). He has three sisters. Meyer graduated from the University of Iowa with a degree in theater and filmmaking, and also wrote film reviews for the campus newspaper.

== Career ==
=== Author ===
Meyer first gained public attention for his best-selling 1974 Sherlock Holmes novel The Seven-Per-Cent Solution, a story of Holmes confronting his cocaine addiction with the help of Sigmund Freud.

Meyer followed this with six additional Holmes novels: The West End Horror (1976), The Canary Trainer (1993), The Adventure of the Peculiar Protocols (2019), The Return of the Pharaoh (2021), The Telegram From Hell (2024), and The Real Thing (2025).

Meyer has said that The Adventure of the Peculiar Protocols was inspired by Steven Zipperstein's Pogrom: Kishinev and the Tilt of History.

=== Writer/Director ===
The Seven-Per-Cent Solution was later adapted as a 1976 film of the same name, for which Meyer wrote the screenplay. The film was directed by Herbert Ross and starred Nicol Williamson, Robert Duvall, Alan Arkin and Laurence Olivier. For his work adapting the novel, Meyer was nominated for an Academy Award for Best Adapted Screenplay at the 49th Academy Awards.

Intrigued by the first part of college friend Karl Alexander's then-incomplete novel Time After Time, Meyer optioned the book and adapted it into a screenplay. He consented to sell the script only if he were attached as director. The deal was optioned by Warner Bros., and the film became Meyer's directorial debut. Meyer freely allowed Alexander to borrow from the screenplay. The latter published his novel at about the same time the movie was released.

Time After Time (1979) starred Malcolm McDowell, Mary Steenburgen and David Warner. It was a critical and commercial success.

Meyer next "wanted to make a film of the Robertson Davies novel, Fifth Business. And I had written the screenplay. And nobody was interested in doing this." At the behest of then Paramount executive Karen Moore, he was hired to direct Star Trek II: The Wrath of Khan.

Meyer later directed the 1983 television film The Day After, starring Jason Robards, JoBeth Williams, John Cullum, Bibi Besch, John Lithgow and Steve Guttenberg, which depicted the ramifications of a nuclear attack on the United States. Meyer had originally decided not to do any television work, but changed his mind upon reading the script by Edward Hume. For his work on The Day After, Meyer was nominated for an Emmy Award for Best Director. Afterward, he also directed "The Pied Piper of Hamelin", a 1985 episode of the television series Shelley Duvall's Faerie Tale Theatre.

He resumed directing theatrical films with the 1985 comedy Volunteers, starring Tom Hanks and John Candy. He then returned to Star Trek, co-writing the screenplay for Star Trek IV: The Voyage Home (1986) with producer Harve Bennett.

In 1986 Meyer helped James Dearden write the screenplay for Fatal Attraction, based on a short movie Dearden made in 1980 called Diversion. In Meyer's book The View from the Bridge: Memories of Star Trek and a Life in Hollywood, he explains that in late 1986 producer Stanley R. Jaffe asked him to look at the script developed by Dearden, and he wrote a four-page memo making suggestions for the script including a new ending for the movie. A few weeks later he met with director Adrian Lyne and gave him some additional suggestions.

Meyer's next directing job was the 1988 Merchant Ivory produced drama The Deceivers, with Pierce Brosnan as British officer William Savage. Meyer later wrote and directed the 1991 spy comedy Company Business, starring Gene Hackman and Mikhail Baryshnikov as aging American and Russian secret agents. In 1991, Meyer once again returned to the world of Star Trek, co-writing and directing Star Trek VI: The Undiscovered Country, which became a swan song for the original cast. In 1995, he completed a two-part teleplay based on Homer's Odyssey which he temporarily published on his website in 2003. He would be credited as one of the producers of the 1997 mini-series. Meyer performed uncredited rewrites on an early draft of the screenplay of the 1997 James Bond film Tomorrow Never Dies.

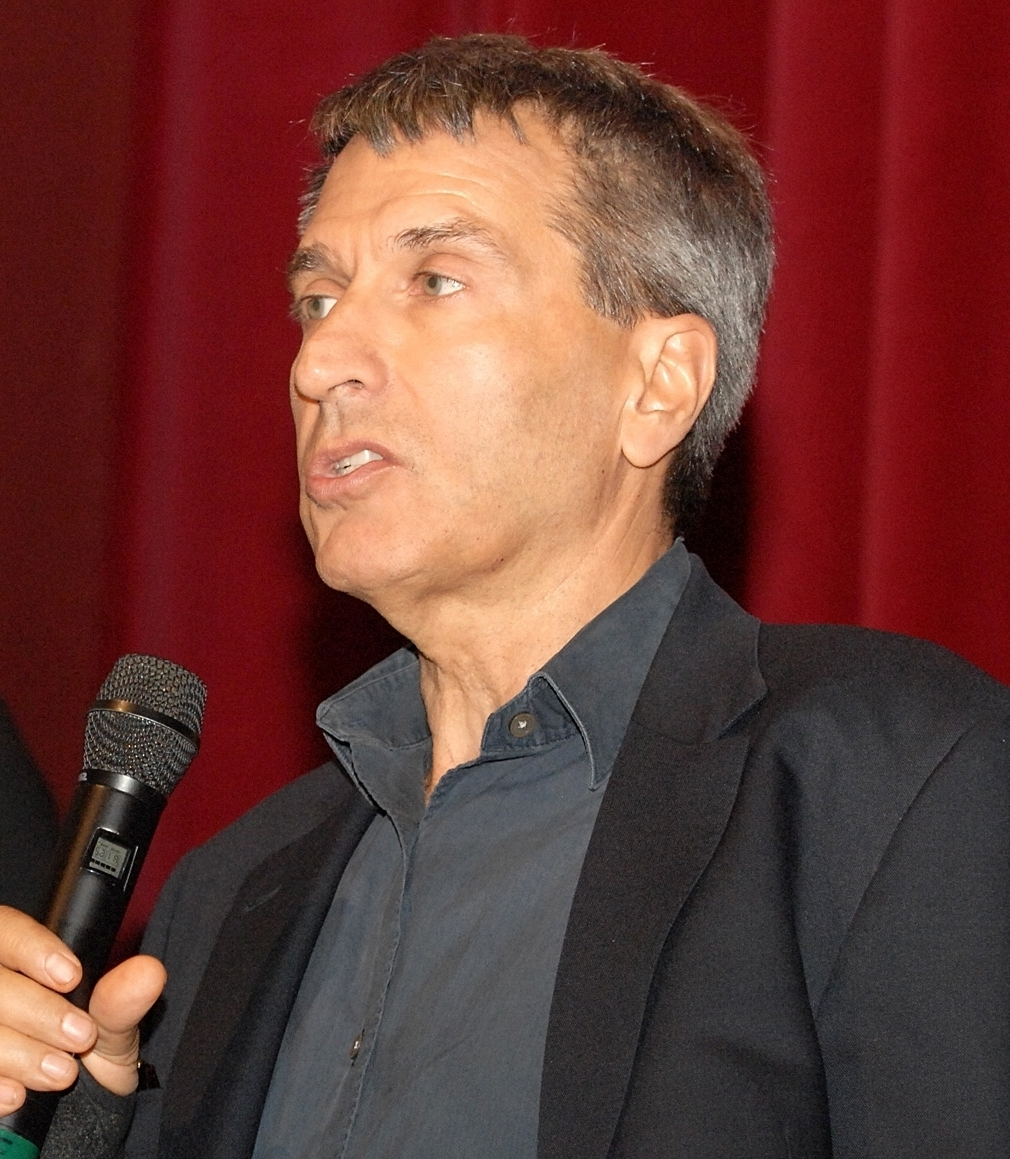
Meyer in 2008

Meyer adapted the Philip Roth novel The Human Stain into the 2003 film of the same name. In 2006, he teamed with Martin Scorsese to write the screenplay for Scorsese's adaptation of Edmund Morris's Pulitzer Prize winning biography of Theodore Roosevelt, The Rise of Theodore Roosevelt. The story traces Roosevelt's early life.

The two part, four hour, History Channel event miniseries, Houdini, starring Adrien Brody, aired over Labor Day 2014. Meyer's script was nominated for a WGA award and the series was nominated for seven Emmys.

In 2016, he co-created the Italian-British series Medici: Masters of Florence with Frank Spotnitz for Italian TV channel Rai 1, and wrote the first two episodes of season one.

=== Star Trek ===
Meyer, along with writer/producer Harve Bennett, is one of two people credited with revitalizing and perhaps saving the Star Trek franchise after the problems of the first film, Star Trek: The Motion Picture, almost caused Paramount Pictures to end the series. Paramount had been unhappy with the creative direction of the first film, as well as the cost overruns and production problems. However, the film was also a great financial success, and they wanted a sequel. Bennett, a reliable television producer, was hired to help.

Introduced to Bennett by Paramount executive Karen Moore, Meyer was hired as a potential director for Star Trek II: The Wrath of Khan despite never having seen the first film. Due to problems with the early drafts of the script, which most readers disliked, Meyer quickly became involved in re-writing the film's screenplay. After meeting with Bennett and other cast members and crew members regarding the script, Meyer impressed Star Trek actors and producers by delivering a superior script draft in only twelve days. The draft had to be completed so quickly that Meyer agreed to forgo negotiating a contract or credit for his writing to begin work on the script immediately. As a result, he is uncredited as a writer on the final film.

Meyer made stylistic alterations in his direction, such as adding more of a naval appearance to the production. Meyer and Bennett created an engaging film while also reducing costs and avoiding the production fiascoes of the first Star Trek film. The Wrath of Khan became a financial success, grossing $78 million in the domestic market, and is considered by many to be the best Star Trek film to date.

Although he "refuse[d] to specialize" and so vowed to not work on another Star Trek project, Meyer co-wrote the screenplay for the fourth Star Trek film, Star Trek IV: The Voyage Home with Bennett. For that film, Bennett wrote the first and third acts, which occur in the 23rd century, and Meyer wrote the second act, which occurs in 1986 San Francisco. Meyer has said that one of the most enjoyable aspects of working on this film was getting the chance to re-use elements which he had been forced to discard from his earlier film, Time After Time. Star Trek IV proved to be successful financially, notable for succeeding with general moviegoers as well as science fiction and Star Trek devotees.

Meyer worked for the Star Trek franchise again for the sixth film in the series, Star Trek VI: The Undiscovered Country (1991). He developed the story with Leonard Nimoy and co-wrote the screenplay with long-time friend and assistant Denny Flinn. He directed the picture, which was the final film to feature the entire classic Star Trek cast. Like its predecessors, this film was successful financially, grossing $74 million in the domestic market. Many of Meyer's personal papers from his involvement with the Star Trek franchise are housed at the University of Iowa Libraries.

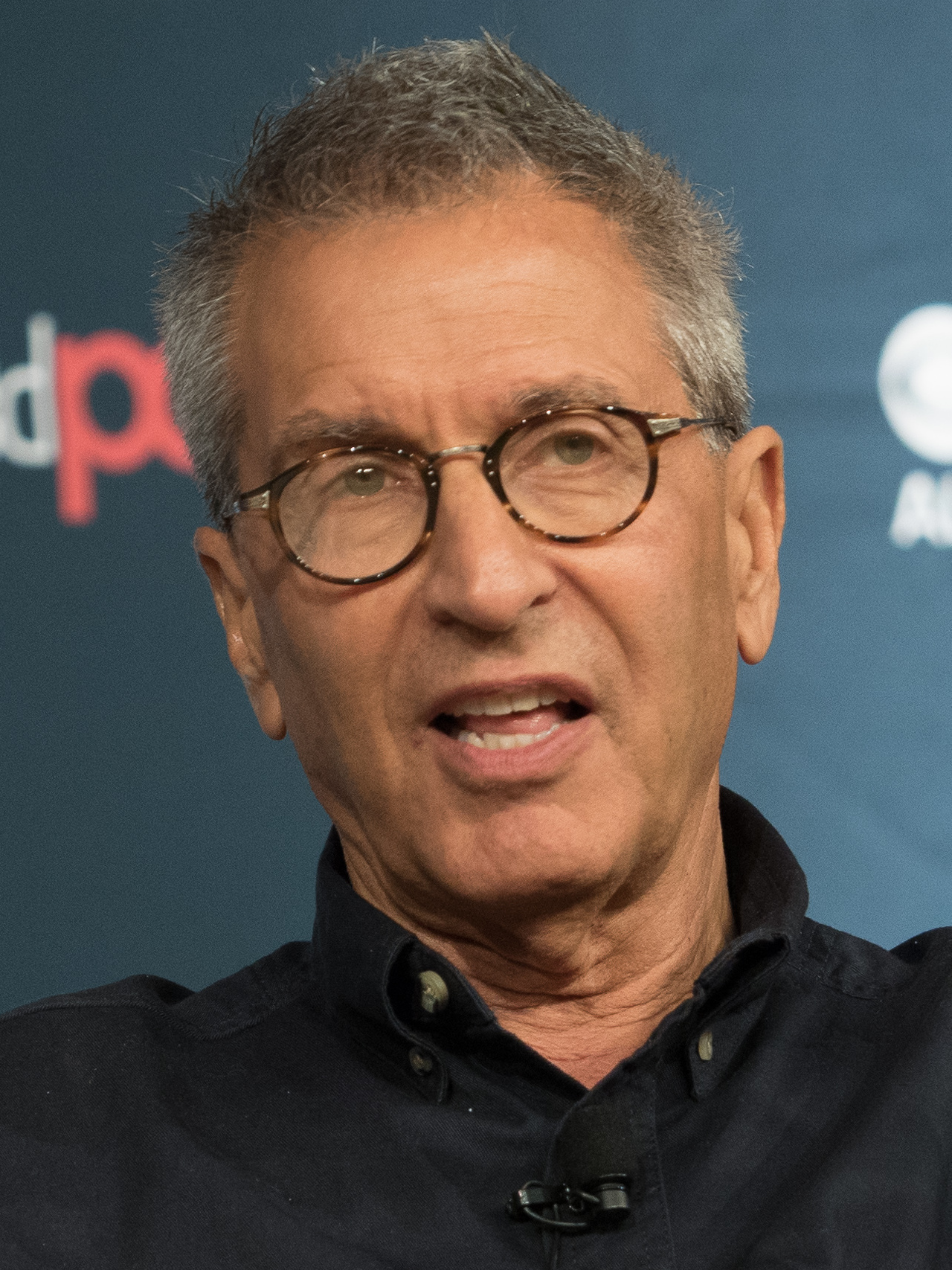
Meyer in 2016

In February 2016 it was announced that Meyer would be returning to Star Trek by joining the writing team for CBS's new TV series Star Trek: Discovery. In November 2018, Meyer announced in an online interview that he was not invited back for Discovery's second season. He also disclosed that he could not identify his precise contributions, as television is such a collaborative medium.

In 2020, Meyer wrote a detailed proposal with his producing partner Steven-Charles Jaffe for a new Star Trek project, including a treatment and illustrations. Meyer said the project was not connected to any of the franchise's previous films and was set in a gap in the Star Trek timeline where an original story could be told with new characters. He described the project as a feature film, but said it could also be a television series or a combination of television and film. Meyer and Jaffe presented this proposal to Star Trek television producer Alex Kurtzman, Abrams, and Watts, but had not heard anything back from Paramount by March 2021. At that time, Paramount set Star Trek: Discovery writer Kalinda Vazquez to write the script for a new Star Trek film, based on her own original idea, with Abrams's Bad Robot producing.

In 2025, Paramount pictures and Secret Hideout released the audio drama Star Trek: Khan in November 2025, a story originally conceived and written by Meyer for possible live action filming as a proposed miniseries and finally relseased as Star Treks first Audio Drama in the same vein as the BBC Big Finish Productions, Doctor Who audio dramas.

== Personal life ==
Meyer was married to Lauren Taylor Meyer in the late 1980s and they had two daughters. Lauren died of breast cancer in 1993. Meyer's daughter, screenwriter Dylan Meyer, married actress and filmmaker Kristen Stewart on April 21, 2025.

In 2023, Meyer won the Future of Life Award, for reducing the risk of nuclear war through the power of storytelling.

== Filmography ==
=== Film ===
Year	Title	Director	Writer
1973	Invasion of the Bee Girls	No	Yes
1976	The Seven-Per-Cent Solution	No	Yes
1979	Time After Time	Yes	Yes
1982	Star Trek II: The Wrath of Khan	Yes	Uncredited
1985	Volunteers	Yes	No
1986	Star Trek IV: The Voyage Home	No	Yes
1987	Fatal Attraction	No	Uncredited
1988	The Deceivers	Yes	No
1991	Company Business	Yes	Yes
1991	Star Trek VI: The Undiscovered Country	Yes	Yes
1993	Sommersby	No	Yes
1995	Voices	No	Yes
1997	Tomorrow Never Dies	No	Uncredited
1998	The Prince of Egypt	No	Additional
2003	The Human Stain	No	Yes
2008	Elegy	No	Yes
2009	The Hessen Affair	No	Yes

Producer

- Collateral Damage (2002)

=== Television ===
Year	Title	Director	Writer	Notes
1985	Faerie Tale Theatre	Yes	Yes	Episode "The Pied Piper of Hamelin"
2016	Medici: Masters of Florence	No	Yes	1 episode Also co-creator
2017	Star Trek: Discovery	No	Yes	1 episode; Also consulting producer
2017	On Cinema at the Cinema	No	No	As himself

Miniseries

Year	Title	Writer	Executive Producer
1997	The Odyssey	No	Yes
2014	Houdini	Yes	No

TV movies

Year	Title	Director	Writer	Executive Producer
1974	Judge Dee and the Monastery Murders	No	Yes	No
1975	The Night That Panicked America	No	Yes	No
1983	The Day After	Yes	No	No
1997	The Informant	No	Yes	Yes
1999	Vendetta	Yes	No	No
2002	Fall from the Sky	No	Yes	No
2006	Orpheus	No	Yes	Yes

== Bibliography ==
Year	Title	Notes
1970	The Love Story Story	Non-fiction
1974	The Seven-Per-Cent Solution	Sherlock Holmes pastiche Publishers Weekly's bestselling novels of 1974; The New York Times Best Seller list.
1974	Target Practice	
1976	The West End Horror	Sherlock Holmes pastiche The New York Times Best Seller list.
1978	Black Orchid	Co-Written with Barry J. Kaplan
1981	Confessions of a Homing Pigeon	
1993	The Canary Trainer	Sherlock Holmes pastiche
2009	The View From the Bridge: Memories of Star Trek and a Life in Hollywood	Non-fiction
2019	The Adventure of the Peculiar Protocols	Sherlock Holmes pastiche
2021	The Return of the Pharaoh	Sherlock Holmes pastiche
2024	Sherlock Holmes and the Telegram from Hell	Sherlock Holmes pastiche
2025	Sherlock Holmes and the Real Thing	Sherlock Holmes pastiche

== Awards and nominations ==
Award	Year	Title	Category	Result
Academy Awards	1976	The Seven-Per-Cent Solution	Best Adapted Screenplay	Nominated
Emmy Awards	1975	The Night That Panicked America	Outstanding Writing for a Miniseries, Movie or a Dramatic Special	Nominated
Emmy Awards	1983	The Day After	Outstanding Directing in a Limited Series or a Special	Nominated
Emmy Awards	1983	The Day After	Outstanding Drama/Comedy Special	Nominated
Emmy Awards	1997	The Odyssey	Outstanding Miniseries	Nominated
Satellite Awards	2008	Elegy	Best Adapted Screenplay	Nominated
Saturn Awards	1979	Time After Time	Best Science Fiction Film	Nominated
Saturn Awards	1979	Time After Time	Best Director	Nominated
Saturn Awards	1979	Time After Time	Best Writing	Won
Saturn Awards	1982	Star Trek II: The Wrath of Khan	Best Director	Won
Saturn Awards	1982	Star Trek II: The Wrath of Khan	Best Science Fiction Film	Nominated
Saturn Awards	1984	The George Pal Memorial Award		Won
Saturn Awards	1986	Star Trek IV: The Voyage Home	Best Writing	Nominated
Saturn Awards	1991	Star Trek VI: The Undiscovered Country	Best Science Fiction Film	Won
Saturn Awards	1991	Star Trek VI: The Undiscovered Country	Best Writing	Nominated
Spur Awards	1993	Sommersby	Best Drama Script	Won
