= The Adventure of the Deptford Horror =

Short story

"The Adventure of the Deptford Horror" is a Sherlock Holmes story by Adrian Conan Doyle, the youngest son of Sir Arthur Conan Doyle, the Sherlock Holmes creator. The story was published in the 1954 collection The Exploits of Sherlock Holmes. It was first published in Collier's on 18 September 1953, and was illustrated by Robert Fawcett in Collier's. The story was also included in the 1967 anthology Seventeen Steps to 221B.

== Plot ==
Holmes and Watson are called to a house in Deptford, due to the concerns of a young woman about her safety. Several of her relatives have died in the past few years of heart attacks. A relative who trains canaries also lives in the house. Holmes is not able to detect anything amiss until he and Watson are en route home, but he suddenly solves the mystery and returns to Deptford to save the life of the young woman from a death by heart failure.

== Allusions ==
This apocryphal story was inspired by the mention in "The Adventure of Black Peter" of Holmes's "arrest of Wilson, the notorious canary-trainer, which removed a plague-spot from the East-End of London." In this story, Wilson is not arrested, but this discrepancy is explained as an error due to Dr Watson.

== See also ==
- The Canary Trainer
