= The Adventure of the Sealed Room =

Short story

"The Adventure of the Sealed Room" is a Sherlock Holmes murder mystery by Adrian Conan Doyle (the youngest son of Sir Arthur Conan Doyle, the Sherlock Holmes creator) and John Dickson Carr. The story was published in the 1954 collection The Exploits of Sherlock Holmes. It was first published in Collier's on 13 June 1953, and was illustrated by Robert Fawcett in Collier's.

The story is a locked-room mystery. It expands on the comment by Doctor Watson in "The Adventure of the Engineer's Thumb": "Of all the problems which have been submitted to my friend, Mr. Sherlock Holmes, for solution during the years of our intimacy, there were only two which I was the means of introducing to his notice -- that of Mr. Hatherley's thumb, and that of Colonel Warburton's madness."

== Plot ==
Rising early one morning for his medical practice, Dr Watson discovers that his first patient is Cora Murray, his wife's friend. She informs Watson that Colonel Warburton is dead. His wife, Eleanor Warburton, is horribly wounded. Because the couple had locked themselves in a room with a collection of Indian antiquities before the gunshots were heard, the incident appears to be a murder–suicide caused by a sudden fit of madness in the Colonel.

Watson escorts Miss Murray to Sherlock Holmes' residence at 221B Baker Street, and Holmes soon becomes interested in the case. Holmes learns that Miss Murray, Major Earnshaw, and Captain Lasher (the Colonel's nephew) were all in the house at the time of the tragedy, along with a sinister Indian servant.
