= The Adventure of the Two Women =

Short story

"The Adventure of the Two Women" is a Sherlock Holmes crime story by Adrian Conan Doyle, the youngest son of Sir Arthur Conan Doyle, the Sherlock Holmes creator. The story was published in the 1954 collection The Exploits of Sherlock Holmes. It was first published in Collier's on 4 September 1953, and was illustrated by Robert Fawcett in Collier's.

== Plot ==
Holmes is called upon to save the widow of a distinguished family from shame. Her noble husband, Henry Gladsdale, the late Duke of Carringford served his country well, but now the Duchess Carringford and her betrothed daughter, Lady Mary Gladsdale, are facing ruin. A blackmailer threatens to expose a prior marriage by Henry Gladsdale that would nullify his marriage to the current Duchess. The price for silence is Gladsdale's private papers, which undoubtedly contain information valuable to foreign powers.

Holmes must fend off the threats of a thug, discover the identity of the blackmailer, and commit a crime himself before he resolves the extortion plot.
