= The Adventure of the Highgate Miracle =

Short story

"The Adventure of the Highgate Miracle" is a Sherlock Holmes mystery story written in collaboration by Adrian Conan Doyle (the youngest son of Sir Arthur Conan Doyle, the Sherlock Holmes creator) and John Dickson Carr. The story was published in the 1954 collection, The Exploits of Sherlock Holmes. It was first published in Collier's on 6 June 1953, illustrated by Robert Fawcett.

== Plot ==
The overbearing wife of James Cabpleasure demands that Holmes investigate the abnormal attachment her husband has to an ordinary umbrella. Gloria Cabpleasure has gone to the trouble of having a mechanic examine the umbrella for any secret compartment. Holmes and Watson discover that Mrs. Cabpleasure has even gone to the police, and Inspector Lestrade is investigating Mr. Cabpleasure also. While conducting surveillance on the Cabpleasure home, everyone observes James Cabpleasure emerge from his front door, go back for his umbrella, and then vanish completely, along with valuable diamonds from his company.
