= The Adventure of the Dark Angels =

"The Adventure of the Dark Angels" is a Sherlock Holmes murder mystery by Adrian Conan Doyle, the youngest son of Sir Arthur Conan Doyle, the Sherlock Holmes creator. The story was published in the 1954 collection The Exploits of Sherlock Holmes. It was first published in Collier's on 7 August 1953, and was illustrated by Robert Fawcett in Collier's.

== Plot ==
Holmes and Dr. Watson arrive at their residence to discover that Daphne Ferrers is waiting to consult with Holmes about the behavior of her father, Josua Ferrers of Abbotstanding in Hampshire. Not only has her father selected the most isolated abode after retiring from his business interests in Sicily, but he has become even more reclusive and agitated due to the appearance of pictures of angels of death on his property. After a few calculations, Holmes knows that he must move quickly to prevent a tragedy, but arrives too late to save Josua Ferrers' life.
