= The Adventure of the Abbas Ruby =

1954 short story

"The Adventure of the Abbas Ruby" is a Sherlock Holmes mystery by Adrian Conan Doyle, the youngest son of Sir Arthur Conan Doyle, the Sherlock Holmes creator. The story was published in the 1954 collection The Exploits of Sherlock Holmes. It was first published in Collier's on 21 August 1953, and was illustrated by Robert Fawcett in Collier's. It was also printed in two issues of the magazine Summertime in 1965, illustrated by Paul Granger.

== Plot ==
Holmes is startled by the sudden appearance during a blizzard of Andrew Joliffe, the butler of horticulturalist Sir John Doverton. During a dinner party, the Abbas Ruby disappeared from the Doverton house, as did all the blooms on Sir John's camellia bush. The police arrive at Holmes residence to arrest Joliffe, but not before Joliffe admits that he was the same Joliffe involved in the Catterdon Diamond robbery. Before departing with his prisoner, Inspector Gregson of Scotland Yard shows Holmes and Watson the empty jewel case found concealed in Joliffe's room.
