= The Adventure of the Red Widow =

Short story

"The Adventure of the Red Widow" is a short Sherlock Holmes murder mystery by Adrian Conan Doyle, the youngest son of Sir Arthur Conan Doyle, the Sherlock Holmes creator. The story was published in the 1954 collection The Exploits of Sherlock Holmes. It was first published in Collier's on 2 October 1953, and was illustrated by Robert Fawcett in Collier's.

== Plot ==
Holmes and Watson are invited by Scotland Yard Inspector Gregson to accompany him to an ancient country mansion in Derbyshire. The crime scene remains undisturbed, indicating that the lord of the manor has been decapitated by the guillotine in his own museum. His head and his cousin, Captain Lothian, are both missing, along with a horse from the stable. Holmes annoys a local police inspector named Dawlish by lingering over the crime scene, but quickly resolves the mystery.
