= The Adventure of the Wax Gamblers =

Short story by Adrian Conan Doyle and John Dickson Carr

"The Adventure of the Wax Gamblers" is a Sherlock Holmes short story written in collaboration by Adrian Conan Doyle (the youngest son of Sir Arthur Conan Doyle, the Sherlock Holmes creator) and John Dickson Carr. The story was published in the 1954 collection The Exploits of Sherlock Holmes. It was first published in Collier's on 20 June 1953, illustrated by Robert Fawcett.

== Plot ==
While waiting up late one night, Holmes and Watson are visited by the night watchman of a famous waxworks and his grand–daughter. The watchman has noticed that the playing cards in the hand of a wax figure in a Chamber of Horrors exhibit have changed. Holmes becomes immediately interested in this mystery and sends Watson to the exhibit to remove the cards in an orderly fashion and to bring them back to him in some envelopes. Holmes then demonstrates that the altered cards are related to the scandalous behavior of a gentleman and his wagering on horse races.
