= The Adventure of the Gold Hunter =

Short story

"The Adventure of the Gold Hunter" is a Sherlock Holmes murder mystery by Adrian Conan Doyle (the youngest son of Sir Arthur Conan Doyle, the Sherlock Holmes creator) and John Dickson Carr. The story was published in the 1954 collection The Exploits of Sherlock Holmes. It was first published in Collier's on 30 May 1953, illustrated by Robert Fawcett.

== Plot ==
The Reverend James Appley asks Holmes to investigate the sudden and unexpected death of Squire Trelawney of his parish in Somerset. Rev. Appley is concerned because the suspect is his nephew, Dr. Paul Griffin, the attending physician. Trelawney recently named Griffin his sole beneficiary, disinheriting the previous beneficiary, his niece, Miss Dolores Dale. Miss Dale's fiancé, Jeffrey Ainsworth, claims that he saw Trewlaney alive and well until late in the night.

The problem is that no one can determine the cause of death, not even the famous pathologist Sir Leopold Harper, who conducted an autopsy. A clue might lie in the gold hunter, a popular pocket watch, owned by the deceased gentleman. Holmes once more solves the puzzle to the chagrin of Inspector Lestrade.

"And see," he continued, hastening to the small table in question, "what a treasure–trove we have here! Look at this, Lestrade! Look at it!"

"But, Holmes, it is only a small pot of vaseline such as you may buy at any chemist's!"

"On the contrary, it is a hangman's rope."
