= The Canary Trainer =

1993 novel by Nicholas Meyer

- First edition cover
- Author: Nicholas Meyer
- Language: English
- Genre: Mystery fiction
- Publisher: W.W. Norton
- Publication date: 20 September 1993
- Publication place: United States
- Media type: Print (Hardback & Paperback)
- Pages: 224 pp (first edition, hardback)
- ISBN: 0-393-03608-1 (first edition, hardback)
- OCLC: 27894427
- Dewey Decimal: 813/.54 20
- LC Class: PS3563.E88 C3 1993
- Preceded by: The West End Horror
- Followed by: The Adventure of the Peculiar Protocols

The Canary Trainer: From the Memoirs of John H. Watson is a 1993 Sherlock Holmes pastiche by Nicholas Meyer. Like The Seven Percent Solution and The West End Horror, The Canary Trainer was published as a "lost manuscript" of the late Dr. John H. Watson. In "The Adventure of Black Peter", an original Arthur Conan Doyle Holmes story from 1904, Watson mentions that his companion recently arrested "Wilson, the notorious canary-trainer, which removed a plague-spot from the East-End of London". This Wilson (who figures prominently in the Adrian Conan Doyle pastiche "The Adventure of the Deptford Horror") is not related to the eponymous character of Meyer's novel. Meyer's "trainer" is Erik, the principal figure of Gaston Leroux's 1910 novel The Phantom of the Opera. It is from this unchronicled tale that The Notorious Canary Trainers (a Sherlockian scion in Madison, Wisconsin, founded in 1969) take their name.

The Canary Trainer describes Holmes's adventures during "The Great Hiatus" of 1891–1894, when (according to the Sherlockian Canon) he was traveling the world, trying to escape the minions of Professor Moriarty; in Meyer's The Seven-Per-Cent Solution, however, a different impetus is given for this period, and this alternate scenario is maintained here. The bulk of the novel is a first-person narrative, in which Holmes recounts a visit to Paris, where he played violin for the Palais Garnier and became entangled with a mysterious "Phantom". Although Dr. Watson appears only in the novel's 1912 bookend scenes, a significant sub-plot concerns Holmes' efforts to (temporarily) replace the former with a young Parisian, who, while useful, is not nearly as brave or devoted as Holmes' usual companion.

This novel takes place before Meyer's second Holmes pastiche, The West End Horror.

== Plot summary ==
In 1912, Dr. Watson visits the retired Sherlock Holmes, who is happily cultivating bees on the Sussex Downs. Holmes seems mostly concerned about interesting Watson in his new hobby, but Watson prefers to interrogate Holmes and fill some of the gaps in previous Sherlockian history. For example, Watson says, Holmes's account of how he spent the "Lost Years" (1891 to 1895) was laden with contradictions. Finally, he persuades Holmes to retell one episode of his adventures.

The narration switches to Holmes. He describes how, following the events of The Seven Percent Solution, he traveled Europe and slowly realized that the entire world believed him dead. Wandering aimlessly, he finds himself in Paris, where after a short-lived stint as a violin instructor, he obtains a position at the Paris Opéra. From the very beginning, his job has ominous undertones. For example, the vacancy only appeared because the previous violinist ran into the street, swearing that he would never work in the place again. This does not daunt Holmes, who interviews with and favourably impresses the conductor, Maître Gaston Leroux.

Holmes gradually becomes accustomed to the Opera's distinctive culture. He learns that all minor mishaps are attributed to the Ghost, a spectral personage who haunts the Opera's labyrinthine passageways, sometimes appearing to ballet dancers wearing an evening suit but without a head.

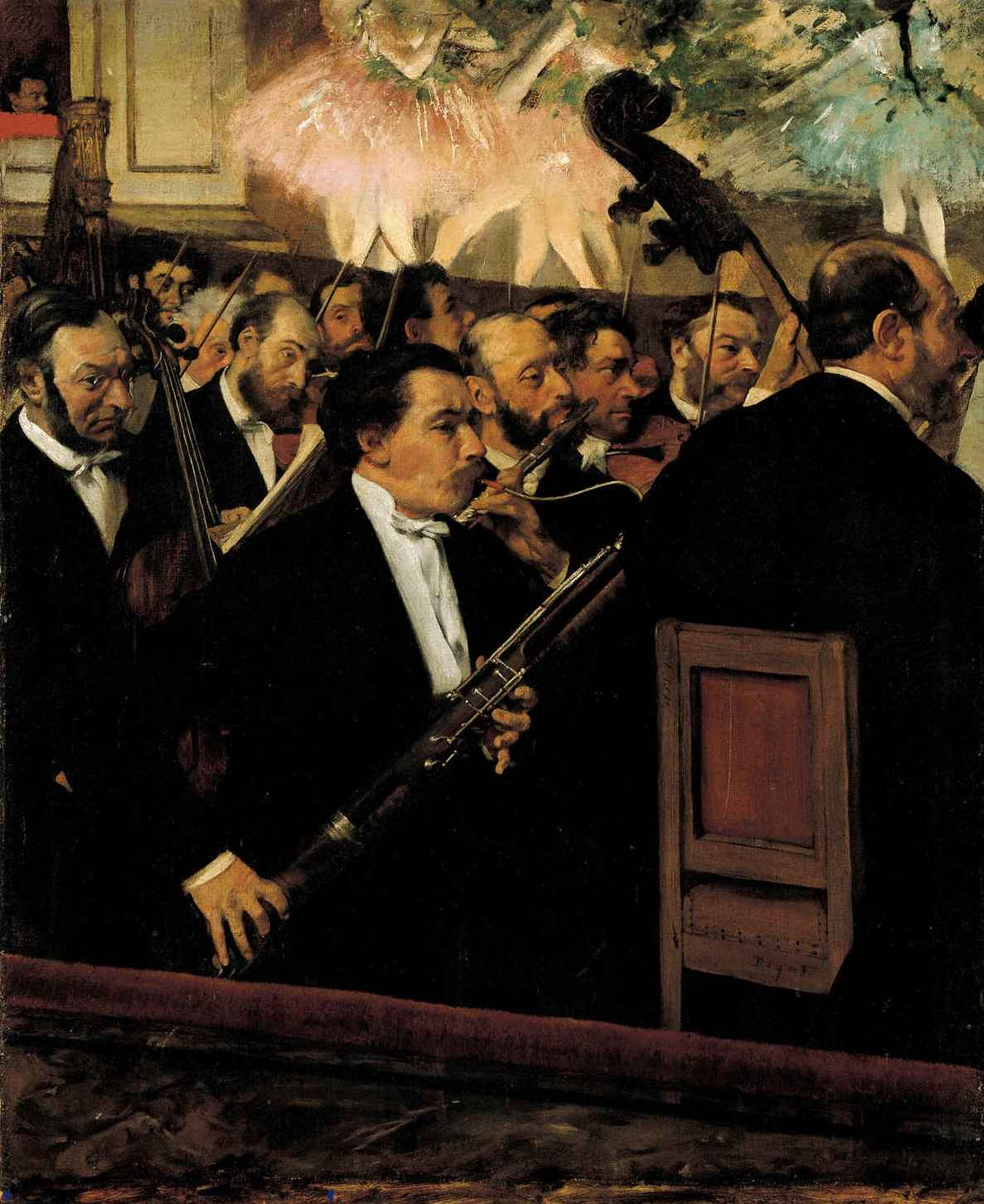
L'orchestre de l'opéra by Edgar Degas, 1870. A similar (fictional) Degas sketch alerts Irene Adler to Holmes' presence.

All goes well until the prima donna soprano, La Sorelli, falls ill and is replaced by Irene Adler, a past adversary known for her ability to outwit Holmes. His admiration for her provokes uncertain emotions, largely foreign to his calculating nature—but he soon realizes that torment is secondary, when the opera rehearsals subject him to her incomparably beautiful singing. He suffers in silence until Adler sees his profile in a Degas painting, whereupon she realizes that he is alive, and enlists his help. She has taken the young coloratura Christine Daaé "under her wing", and is fearful that the innocent singer may fall prey to intrigue once Adler has left.

Irene Adler blackmails Holmes into assisting her, promising that she will remain silent about his survival. While investigating the intrigues that surround Christine, Holmes appears to run afoul of the Opera Ghost.

== Characters ==
Note: Bolded characters are based upon characters from The Phantom of the Opera. Italicized characters are based on existing Sherlock Holmes stories.

- Sherlock Holmes – the detective, protagonist
- Dr. Watson – initial narrator
- **La Sorelli** – the prima donna soprano
- Irene Adler – also a singer (previously appeared in "A Scandal in Bohemia")
- **Christine Daaé** – the young coloratura
- Maître Gaston Leroux – the conductor
- The Phantom of the Opera/Nobody: identified in the original novel as Erik, but never named in Meyer's version.

== Reception ==
Kirkus Reviews found the book lacking, calling the finale "anticlimactic" and summing the review up by saying "Should appeal to those fans (and there will be plenty) who can overlook the undistinguished stylistic pastiche—Holmes rather unwisely narrates this lost adventure himself—the footnotes that explain every last Holmesian reference, and the unfortunate poverty of the plot." Matthew Bunson in Encyclopedia Sherlockiana said the plot worked nicely within Leroux's original novel but found the climax "unequal to the reputations of both characters" and found Watson to be "acutely missed". Publishers Weekly said that "Meyer's casual plotting (piggybacking on the over-familiar Phantom outline) sinks on occasion into travelogue and affords Holmes little opportunity to flex his deductive muscles" but "overall, Meyer treats his readers to a lively and entertaining, if undemanding ride".

== Allusions to other works ==
In the prologue, Meyer refers to the "Baring-Gould papers" as having caused a resumption of interest in Holmes' life, and Meyer includes several allusions to William S. Baring-Gould's works. At the end of the novel, Holmes implies that he and Adler consummated their relationship in Montenegro; this seems to be a reference to Baring-Gould's theory that Nero Wolfe was the love child of Holmes and Adler from an affair they had in Montenegro in 1892. Holmes' undercover name, Sigerson, is both a reference to Conan Doyle's story "The Adventure of the Empty House" where Holmes uses that name, and Baring-Gould's Sherlock Holmes of Baker Street, where Holmes' father's name was Siger.

Raoul compares Holmes to Auguste Dupin, a comparison which causes Holmes some offense. Watson had also compared Holmes to Dupin in A Study in Scarlet, with similar results.

The Marquis de St.-Evremonde, the descendant of Charles Darnay and Lucie Manette from A Tale of Two Cities, is among the guests of the Paris Opera.

In the novel's afterword, Meyer acknowledges the two most obvious influences, Conan Doyle's vast Sherlockian opus and Gaston Leroux's The Phantom of the Opera, which Meyer terms an "absurdist masterpiece".

== Release details ==
- 1993, USA, W W Norton ISBN 0-393-03608-1, Pub date 20 September 1993, hardback (First edition)
- 1995, USA, W W Norton ISBN 0-393-31241-0, Pub date ? March 1995, paperback

== See also ==
- "The Adventure of the Deptford Horror"
