= The Adventure of Foulkes Rath =

Short story

"The Adventure of Foulkes Rath" is a Sherlock Holmes murder mystery by Adrian Conan Doyle, the youngest son of Sir Arthur Conan Doyle, the Sherlock Holmes creator. The story was published in the 1954 collection The Exploits of Sherlock Holmes. It was first published in Collier's on 27 June 1953, and was illustrated by Robert Fawcett in Collier's.

== Plot ==
Dr. Watson wonders why Holmes has not been involved in the investigation of the apparent murder of Colonel Matthias Addleton by his nephew Percy Longton, only to find that Holmes already has a telegram in his hand from the family attorney. Holmes learns that the uncle and nephew had quarreled over the sale of property belonging to the estate after the uncle had returned from a late night horse ride. Servants, aroused by a scream later that night, found Longton standing over his dying uncle with an axe in his hand. The evidence is overwhelming, but Holmes agrees to look into the matter and join forces with Inspector Lestrade of Scotland Yard.
