= Gareth Rubin =

British novelist and journalist (born 1976)

- Born: 1976 (age 49–50); England, UK
- Education: University of St Andrews; East 15 Acting School
- Occupations: Novelist, journalist
- Writing career
- Language: English
- Genres: Thriller, High-concept fiction
- Notable works: The Turnglass, Holmes and Moriarty
- Website: garethrubin.com

Gareth Rubin (born 1976) is an English novelist and journalist. He has published five novels and writes on cultural and social topics for British newspapers, having worked for many years at The Observer as a features writer and opinion columnist.

Rubin's novels are largely in the high-concept thriller genre, and several experiment with story structure. For example, The Turnglass (2023) is a tête-bêche novel in which two linked stories in the same volume are published back to back and upside down in relation to each other, giving the book two front covers and two first pages.

The sequel to The Turnglass, The Waterfall (2025), is described as "a story within a story within a story within a story", featuring four imaginary books, dating from Jacobean times to the 1940s, that each play a significant role in the book that follows them.

He has also written Holmes and Moriarty (2024), a new Sherlock Holmes novel endorsed by the estate of Arthur Conan Doyle, which features dual narration by Dr Watson and Colonel Moran.

== Early life and career ==
Rubin was born and grew up in Kent, and studied at the University of St Andrews, graduating in English. He went on to study acting at East 15 Acting School. Rubin worked as a TV critic for Time Out, then as a freelance arts and features writer for The Independent and The Observer.

== Novels ==
Rubin's first novel, Liberation Square (2018), is set in an alternate history version of London that is divided as Berlin was after the Second World War, into US and Russian sectors, following the failure of the D-Day landings. His second, The Winter Agent (2020), follows the exploits of a compromised Special Operations Executive unit in wartime France.

His third novel, The Turnglass (2023), features two linked stories relating to the same family's secrets, one from the 1880s and one from the 1930s, in a tête-bêche format. The stories are published back to back and upside down in relation to each other in a single volume, which comes with two front covers and no back cover. The Guardian described it as "an intricate and thoroughly mesmerising tale of family plots and schemes across several generations", and it was shortlisted for the 2025 Grand Prix des Lectrices in the French edition of Elle magazine.

His fourth book, Holmes and Moriarty (2024), is one of five novels to have been authorised by the estate of Arthur Conan Doyle as a continuation of the adventures of Sherlock Holmes, and imagines the detective and his nemesis, Professor Moriarty, thrown into an uneasy alliance by strange events. The book is alternately narrated from Holmes and Moriarty's point of view by their respective companions, Dr Watson and Colonel Moran.

His most recent novel, The Waterfall (2025), is a sequel to The Turnglass. Described on release as "a story within a story within a story within a story", it features four imaginary books written over a period of 400 years, from Jacobean times to the 1940s, each of which becomes central to the plot of the book that follows it. Writing in The Daily Telegraph, Jake Kerridge called the book "a sort of crime Cloud Atlas, comprising four tangentially linked mysteries spanning the centuries".

In December 2025, Rubin was a guest on the Off the Shelf Podcast.

== Bibliography ==
- Liberation Square (2018, Michael Joseph)
- The Winter Agent (2020, Michael Joseph)
- The Turnglass (2023, Simon & Schuster)
- Holmes and Moriarty (2024, Simon & Schuster)
- The Waterfall (2025, Simon & Schuster)
