= The Adventure of the Black Baronet =

1953 short story by Adrian Conan Doyle and John Dickson Carr

"The Adventure of the Black Baronet" is a Sherlock Holmes murder mystery written by Adrian Conan Doyle (the youngest son of Sherlock Holmes creator Sir Arthur Conan Doyle) and John Dickson Carr. The story was published in the 1954 collection The Exploits of Sherlock Holmes. It was first published in Collier's on 23 May 1953, illustrated by Robert Fawcett.

== Plot ==
Holmes and Watson are relaxing in their vacation hotel in East Grinstead when Inspector Gregson of Scotland Yard arrives to obtain assistance in a dreadful murder. Colonel Jocelyn Dalcy, a guest in the home of Sir Reginald Lavington, has been found stabbed to death. No weapon was found, but a dagger is missing from a nearby display. Sir Reginald claims he was using it while fishing and mislaid it. All suspicion falls upon him, and Gregson is about to make the arrest, but Holmes asks for a day to do some more research. An interview with the beautiful Lady Lavington provides the final clue.

== Adaptations ==
"The Adventure of the Black Baronet" was adapted for a half-hour episode of the CBS series Suspense, broadcast on 26 May 1953. Martyn Green played Watson opposite Basil Rathbone. According to Rathbone, it was intended to be a pilot for a subsequent television series which would adapt six more Doyle/Carr stories. No recording of the program is known to have survived.
