= Time After Time (Alexander novel) =

1979 novel by Karl Alexander

- First edition
- Author: Karl Alexander
- Cover artist: Rick Lovell
- Language: English
- Genre: Science fiction, time travel
- Publisher: Delacorte Press
- Publication date: April 1979
- Publication place: United States
- ISBN: 978-0-385-29054-8
- Followed by: Jaclyn the Ripper

Time After Time is a 1979 science fiction novel by American writer Karl Alexander. Its plot speculates what might have happened if H. G. Wells had built a real time machine to travel to the 1970s in search of Jack the Ripper.

The novel was adapted to film the same year, under the same title, by Alexander's friend Nicholas Meyer who had optioned the story after reading the early pages. Meyer wrote his screenplay as Alexander finished the novel and the two freely shared ideas for their respective iterations. A short-lived television series adaptation aired in 2017.

== Plot ==
The novel alternates perspectives between H.G. Wells and a character initially identified only as "Stevenson." In the first chapter, Stevenson has sex with a prostitute in a 19th-century London alley and then murders her. In the next chapter, Wells is introduced showing off his brand new time machine to a group of men, including Stevenson. When police arrive to announce that they have identified Jack the Ripper as Stevenson, Stevenson uses the time machine to escape, and Wells follows him. Wells finds himself in the future and befriends a young bank teller named Amy Robbins. Robbins is unaware of Wells' identity and 19th century provenance and believes him to be just a quirky old-fashioned gentleman. As Stevenson murders several women, Wells pursues him while hampered by a love affair with Robbins, to whom he does not dare tell the truth. When Wells is finally forced to confess to Robbins who he is and what he is really doing, she terminates their relationship. But Stevenson targets her next, and Wells rescues her and incapacitates Stevenson in a dramatic climax.

== Critical reception ==
Kirkus Reviews called Time After Time a "rather heavy-breathing, often precious or pretentious fantasy". On the other hand, Associated Press book reviewer Phil Thomas thought the book was a "well-written, most absorbing piece of escape reading" that "gives the genre a lively and much-needed shot of vitamins". A reviewer for the Madison Courier called Alexander "outrageously imaginative" and the book "marvelous entertainment".

After the release of Felix J. Palma's 2008 Spanish-language novel The Map of Time, which also has a time-travel plot involving Wells and Jack the Ripper, critics commented on the similarities (and differences) between the two books.

== Sequel ==
In November 2009, Alexander released a sequel to the story. Jaclyn the Ripper sees Amy travel to 2010 to discover that Jack the Ripper has been freed from prison and transformed into a girl named Jaclyn. H.G. and Amy must navigate the new millennium with the killer on their trail.

== In other media ==
=== Film ===
A theatrical film based on the novel (which was unfinished at the time), also called Time After Time, premiered nationwide in the United States on September 28, 1979. It starred Malcolm McDowell as Wells, David Warner as Stevenson and Mary Steenburgen as Robbins.

=== Musical ===
A musical version of the novel, with book and lyrics by Stephen Cole and music by Jeffrey Saver, had its first reading in November 2007 as part of the American Musical Theatre Project at Northwestern University in Illinois and in 2010 had its world premiere at the Pittsburgh Playhouse.

=== Television ===
On May 12, 2016, the American Broadcasting Company announced a Time After Time television series from executive producer and writer Kevin Williamson. On March 29, 2017, after five of twelve episodes, it was canceled due to low Nielsen ratings, only finishing its run elsewhere.
