= Time After Time (1979 film) =

1979 film by Nicholas Meyer

- Promotional poster
- Directed by: Nicholas Meyer
- Screenplay by: Nicholas Meyer
- Story by: Steve Hayes
- Based on: Time After Time; 1979 novel by Karl Alexander
- Produced by: Herb Jaffe
- Starring: Malcolm McDowell; David Warner; Mary Steenburgen
- Cinematography: Paul Lohmann
- Edited by: Donn Cambern
- Music by: Miklós Rózsa
- Distributed by: Orion Pictures (through Warner Bros.)
- Release dates: September 7, 1979 (TIFF); September 28, 1979 (United States)
- Running time: 112 minutes
- Country: United States
- Language: English
- Box office: $13 million

Time After Time is a 1979 American science fiction film written and directed by Nicholas Meyer and starring Malcolm McDowell, David Warner, and Mary Steenburgen. Filmed in Panavision, it was the directing debut of Meyer, whose screenplay is based on the premise from Karl Alexander's novel Time After Time (which was unfinished at the time) and a story by Alexander and Steve Hayes. The film presents a story in which British author H. G. Wells uses his time machine to pursue Jack the Ripper into the 20th century.

== Plot ==
In 1893 London, popular writer H. G. Wells displays a newly invented "time machine" to his skeptical dinner guests and explains how it works, including having a "non-return key" that keeps the machine at the traveler's destination and a "vaporizing equalizer" that keeps the traveler and machine on equal terms. Police constables suddenly arrive, searching for Jack the Ripper. A bag with blood-stained gloves belonging to Wells' friend John Leslie Stevenson, a surgeon, leads them to conclude that Stevenson may be the killer. Wells races to his laboratory, but the time machine is gone.

Stevenson escapes to the future but without the "non-return key", causing the machine to reappear in 1893 automatically. Wells then pursues Stevenson to November 5, 1979, where the machine is now on display at a museum in San Francisco. Wells finds the twentieth century's history of warfare, greed, and violence deeply shocking, as he intended to travel to the future in the belief humanity is capable of an enlightened socialist utopia. He also learns that a series of unsolved murders, all of women, have occurred.

Unable to spend his antiquated British currency, Wells exchanges it for American dollars. Hungry, he enters a McDonald's and is alternately puzzled and pleased with modern dining options. Reasoning that Stevenson also needs to exchange British money, Wells visits various banks in search of him. At the Chartered Bank of London, he meets employee Amy Robbins, who directed Stevenson to the Hyatt Regency hotel. Smitten with Wells, she gives him her card, saying he should “give her a ring”.

Upon being confronted by Wells, Stevenson confesses that he finds modern society pleasingly violent, stating, "Ninety years ago, I was a freak. Today, I'm an amateur." Wells tries to convince him they do not belong in 1979, but Stevenson instead attacks him and tries to steal the key. Their struggle is interrupted by a maid, and Stevenson flees, only to be hit by a car during the frantic chase. Wells follows him to the hospital emergency room, but Stevenson is able to escape injured; the hospital, not wanting trouble, lies to Wells that he is dead.

Wells meets up with Amy again, and she initiates a romance. Stevenson returns to the bank, and suspecting that Amy led Wells to him, he frightens her into giving Wells a message and later discovers her address. To convince a highly skeptical Amy that he is telling the truth, Wells takes her three days into the future. Amy is aghast to see a newspaper headline revealing her as the fifth victim of the "San Francisco Ripper".

Wells persuades her that they must go back to prevent the fourth victim's murder, then prevent Amy's. Upon returning, they are delayed and can do no more than phone the police. When the fourth victim is found dead, Wells is arrested and charged with the crime. Amy is left alone, totally defenseless against Stevenson.

While Wells unsuccessfully tries to convince the police of Amy's peril, she attempts to hide from Stevenson. When the police finally investigate her apartment, they find a woman's dismembered body. Finally believing him innocent, the police release a now-heartbroken Wells. However, that woman was Amy's co-worker. Stevenson contacts Wells, tells him he has taken Amy hostage, and demands the key for her life.

Stevenson flees with the key – and Amy as insurance – intending a permanent escape in the time machine. Wells erratically drives Amy's car and follows them to the museum. While Wells bargains for Amy's life, she is able to escape. As Stevenson starts the time machine, Wells removes the "vaporizing equalizer", casting Stevenson across the space-time continuum forever while keeping the machine in the present time.

Wells informs Amy that he must return to 1893 and destroy the machine, given what he has experienced. Knowing that she is already legally dead, Amy insists on going with him. The film finishes with the caption: "H.G. Wells married Amy Catherine Robbins, who died in 1927. As a writer, he anticipated socialism, global war, space travel, and women's liberation. He died in 1946."

== Cast ==
- Malcolm McDowell as Herbert George Wells
- David Warner as John Leslie Stevenson/Jack the Ripper
- Mary Steenburgen as Amy Robbins
- Charles Cioffi as Police Lt. Mitchell
- Kent Williams as assistant
- Patti D'Arbanville as Shirley
- Joseph Maher as Adams
- Corey Feldman as Boy at the museum

== Production ==
According to Meyer from the commentary track for the DVD and Blu-ray release of the film, the author of the novel presented Meyer with 55 pages of his unpublished novel and asked Meyer to critique his work. Meyer liked the premise and immediately optioned the story so he could write a screenplay based on the material and develop the story his way.

McDowell was attracted to the material due to wanting a role that was completely opposite of his performance in Caligula, in which he played the title character.

While preparing to portray Wells, McDowell obtained a copy of a 78 rpm recording of Wells speaking. McDowell was "absolutely horrified" to hear that Wells spoke in a high-pitched, squeaky voice with a pronounced Southeast London accent, which McDowell felt would have resulted in unintentional humor if he tried to mimic it for the film. He instead used a deeper, more "dignified" accent for Wells.

According to David Warner, the studio wanted Mick Jagger for the role of John Leslie Stevenson, but director Nicholas Meyer and producer Herb Jaffe fought for Warner to get the role.

It was one of the last films scored by veteran composer Miklós Rózsa, who received the 1979 Saturn Award for Best Music.

Time After Time was filmed throughout San Francisco, including Cow Hollow, North Beach, the Hyatt Regency hotel, Westin Bonaventure Hotel, California Academy of Sciences in Golden Gate Park, the Marina District, Ghirardelli Square, Fisherman's Wharf, the Richmond District, the Golden Gate Bridge, Grace Cathedral on Nob Hill, the Embarcadero Center, Chinatown, the Marina Green, the Palace of Fine Arts, Potrero Hill, John McLaren Park, and the Civic Center.

== Release ==
The film premiered with a gala presentation at the Toronto International Film Festival on September 7, 1979.

== Reception ==
=== Critical response ===
Time After Time received a positive response from critics. On review aggregator Rotten Tomatoes, the film holds an approval rating of 88% based on 32 reviews. The site's consensus reads, "With the three principal actors having fun with their roles, Time After Time becomes an amusing, light-hearted fantasy lark."

Variety described the film as "a delightful, entertaining trifle of a film that shows both the possibilities and limitations of taking liberties with literature and history. Nicholas Meyer has deftly juxtaposed Victorian England and contemporary America in a clever story, irresistible due to the competence of its cast". Janet Maslin of The New York Times similarly lauded, "Time After Time is every bit as magical as the trick around which it revolves." She continued:

Mr. Meyer isn't a particularly skilled director; this is his first attempt, and on occasion it's very clumsy. But as a whizkid he's gone straight to the head of the class, with a movie that's as sweet as it is clever, and never so clever that it forgets to be entertaining. The satisfactions Time After Time offers are perhaps no more sophisticated than the fun one might have with an intricate set of electric trains. Still, fun of this sort isn't always easy to come by, not after one's age has climbed up into two digits. There's a lot to be said for an adult's movie with the shimmer of a child's new toy.

The interior scenes set in London borrow heavily from the 1960 film The Time Machine, based on the 1895 H.G. Wells novella of the same name. Commentators also noticed parallels between Time After Time and Back to the Future Part III, in which Mary Steenburgen appeared. She said:

Actually, I've played the same scene in that film (Time After Time) and in (BTTF) Part III... I've had a man from a different time period tell me that he's in love with me, but he has to go back to his own time. My response in both cases is, of course, disbelief, and I order them out of my life. Afterwards, I find out I was wrong and that, in fact, the man is indeed from another time, and I go after him (them) to profess my love. It's a pretty strange feeling to find yourself doing the same scene, so many years apart, for the second time in your career.

The casting of Steenburgen for Back to the Future Part III appears to be deliberately intended to mirror the earlier role. In Time After Time, the woman lives in the 20th century, and the time traveler is from the 19th century. In Back to the Future Part III, the woman inhabits the 19th century and the time traveler is from the 20th century. In both films, the woman eventually goes back with the time traveler to live in his time period.

Some similar time travel incongruities as well as the modern San Francisco urban setting also appeared in 1986's Star Trek IV: The Voyage Home, for which Nicholas Meyer shared writing credit. The details of time travellers from distant eras obtaining and exchanging present-day American currency were similar in both films. In Star Trek IV, a featured female character, Dr. Gillian Taylor, ends up joining her paramour, Captain James T. Kirk, living in the future, similar to the conclusion of Time After Time.

=== Accolades ===
Nicholas Meyer won the Saturn Award for Best Writing, Mary Steenburgen won the Saturn Award for Best Actress, and Miklós Rózsa won the Saturn Award for Best Music. Saturn Award nominations went to Meyer for Best Director, Malcolm McDowell for Best Actor, David Warner for Supporting Actor, and Sal Anthony and Yvonne Kubis for Best Costumes, and the film was nominated for Best Science Fiction Film.

Nicholas Meyer won the Antenne II Award and the Grand Prize at the Avoriaz Fantastic Film Festival and he was nominated for the Edgar Allan Poe Award for Best Motion Picture Screenplay and the Hugo Award for Best Dramatic Presentation.

== In other media ==
=== Television ===
On May 12, 2016, the ABC television network announced that it had picked up a Time After Time television series to air in the 2016–2017 television season. The series, executive produced and written by Kevin Williamson, was cancelled after only five episodes.
