= Sherlock Holmes and the Telegram from Hell =

2024 pastiche novel

- Author: Nicholas Meyer
- Language: English
- Genre: Mystery novels
- Publisher: Minotaur Books
- Publication date: August 2024
- Publication place: United States
- Media type: Print (hardcover, paperback), e-book, audiobook
- Pages: 288
- ISBN: 9781613165331 (first edition, hardback)
- Preceded by: The Return of the Pharaoh
- Followed by: Sherlock Holmes and The Real Thing

Sherlock Holmes and the Telegram from Hell is a novel by American writer Nicholas Meyer, featuring the fictional detective Sherlock Holmes created by Arthur Conan Doyle. It is part of Meyer's series of pastiche novels that place Holmes in historical and literary contexts.

== Plot ==
The novel follows Sherlock Holmes as he investigates a mysterious telegram connected to a series of unsettling events.

== Reception ==
Kirkus Reviews praised it as an "ingenious international froth studded with historical tidbits". They also note that Meyer's portrait of the times is "surprising and fascinating". BookReporter wrote that it was "a book that no Sherlock Holmes fan should miss".
