= The West End Horror =

1976 novel by Nicholas Meyer

- First edition cover
- Author: Nicholas Meyer
- Language: English
- Genre: Mystery novels
- Publisher: E. P. Dutton
- Publication date: May 1976
- Publication place: United States
- Media type: Print (Hardback & Paperback)
- ISBN: 0-525-23102-1 (first edition, hardback)
- OCLC: 1945569
- Dewey Decimal: 813/.5/4
- LC Class: PZ4.M6135 We3 PS3563.E88
- Preceded by: The Seven-Per-Cent Solution
- Followed by: The Canary Trainer

The West End Horror: A Posthumous Memoir of John H. Watson, M.D. is a Sherlock Holmes pastiche novel by Nicholas Meyer, published in 1976. It takes place after two of Meyer's other Holmes pastiches, The Seven-Per-Cent Solution and The Canary Trainer, though it was published in between the two.

The plot concerns a series of strange murders in London's theatre district at the end of the 19th century. It also includes a first meeting between Holmes and Doctor Moore Agar, whose "dramatic introduction to Holmes" was one that Watson, in the original Arthur Conan Doyle story "The Adventure of the Devil's Foot", wrote that he "may some day recount".

The West End Horror made The New York Times Best Seller list for eleven weeks between June 13, 1976 and August 22, 1976.

== Plot ==
The book is written in the form of a false document. It opens with a foreword by Meyer, who states that the manuscript was brought to his attention by a woman with some familial connection to Horace Vernet, an ancestor of Holmes. The woman had read The Seven-Per-Cent Solution and thought Meyer might be interested. Although damaged by water, the manuscript proved authentic.

Dr. Watson explains in his own preface that he did not publish the story because of the number of well-known persons who would be affected - persons whose identity would be impossible to disguise. Holmes had for a long time refused Watson permission to write the story on these very grounds, but Watson eventually persuaded him by promising to place the manuscript in Holmes' hands, the only condition being that he not destroy it.

The story involves many well-known people, including George Bernard Shaw, who hires Holmes to look into the death of an unpleasant theatre critic; Sir Arthur Sullivan, one of whose singers at the D'Oyly Carte Opera Company was another victim of the murderer; and others including W. S. Gilbert, Oscar Wilde, Bram Stoker, Henry Irving, Ellen Terry and Frank Harris.

In the novel, Holmes clears the name of a shy Parsee Indian wrongfully accused of murder; in real life Conan Doyle played a significant part in helping George Edalji, a Parsee victim of injustice in the English court.
