= Adrian Conan Doyle =

Son of Arthur Conan Doyle

- Adrian Conan Doyle in 1930
- Born: 19 November 1910; Uckfield, Sussex, England
- Died: 3 June 1970 (aged 59); Geneva, Switzerland
- Occupations: Racing driver, big-game hunter, explorer, writer
- Spouse: Anna Anderson (married 1938-?)
- Parent: Arthur Conan Doyle

Adrian Malcolm Conan Doyle (19 November 1910 – 3 June 1970) was a British literary editor. He was the youngest son of Sir Arthur Conan Doyle, creator of Sherlock Holmes. Adrian was his father's literary executor from 1940 to 1970.

Adrian has been depicted as a racing car driver, big-game hunter, explorer, and writer. Biographer Andrew Lycett calls him a "spendthrift playboy" who (with his brother Denis) "used the Conan Doyle estate as a milch-cow".

== Family background ==
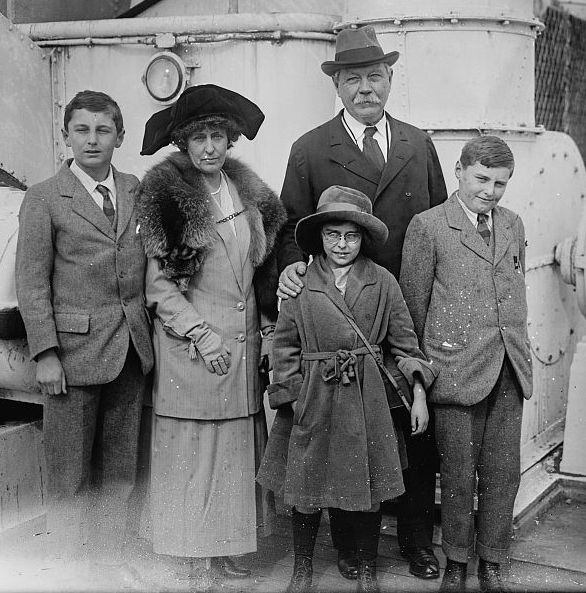
Adrian (right) with his parents and siblings on board the RMS Olympic on 5 April 1923

Adrian Conan Doyle was born in Sussex, England, to writer Sir Arthur Conan Doyle and his second wife Jean Elizabeth Leckie, Lady Doyle. Adrian was the second of their three children, as he had two siblings, sister Jean Conan Doyle and brother Denis. He also had two paternal half-siblings, sister Mary and brother Kingsley.

== Additional Sherlock Holmes stories ==
Adrian was his father's literary executor after his mother died in 1940. On his death, his sister Jean took over as their father's literary executor.

Adrian Conan Doyle produced additional Sherlock Holmes stories, some with the assistance of John Dickson Carr. The basis of his production was to complete those tales referenced in his father's stories, which his father had never written. (Carr had published an "authorized" biography of Sir Arthur in 1949.) These additional Sherlock Holmes tales were written in 1952 and 1953, and a hardcover collection of the stories was published as The Exploits of Sherlock Holmes in 1954. They have been reissued subsequently, while other authors have also written Sherlock Holmes stories based on the same references within the original tales.

== Discovery of unpublished Holmes story ==
On 12 September 1942, the Associated Press announced that an authentic, unpublished Sherlock Holmes story had been found by Adrian Conan Doyle. Supposedly written in his father's distinctive neat handwriting, the story was buried in a chest that contained family documents. (Actually, Jon Lellenberg reported in 1990, the manuscript was not in Sir Arthur's handwriting but typewritten.) Sir Arthur's daughter Jean said she knew the manuscript was not written by her father. Adrian Conan Doyle refused to publish it. A month later, The Baker Street Irregulars wrote a letter to the Saturday Review of Literature, insisting that the story be published.

In the United States, Cosmopolitan magazine obtained it and published it in their August 1948 issue under the uncharacteristic title "The Case of the Man who was Wanted". It was also published in London's Sunday Dispatch magazine the following January. Sherlock Holmes expert Vincent Starrett doubted that the story was written by the elder Doyle and suggested that Adrian was the author.

In September 1945, a letter was sent to Hesketh Pearson, one of Sir Arthur's biographers. It stated, "My pride is not unduly hurt by your remark that 'The Man who was Wanted' is certainly not up to scratch for the sting is much mitigated by your going on to remark that it carries the authentic trade-mark! This, I feel, is a great compliment to my one and only effort at plagiarism." The letter was written by an architect named Arthur Whitaker who had sent the story to Arthur Conan Doyle in 1911, suggesting that they publish it as a joint collaboration. Doyle refused, but sent Whitaker a "cheque for ten guineas" in payment for the story.

After seeing it attributed to Sir Arthur in the Sunday Dispatch, Whitaker wrote a letter to Denis Conan Doyle stating that he was the true author. Denis forwarded the letter to his brother Adrian, who became angry, demanded proof, and threatened legal action. Whitaker had retained a carbon copy, and, after seeing this and listening to people who had read it in 1911, the Doyles admitted in 1949, that Whitaker was the author. The story that many people had accepted as the work of Sir Arthur has since been published as "The Adventure of the Sheffield Banker" in the collection The Further Adventures of Sherlock Holmes.

== Works about his father ==
Sir Arthur's widow, Jean, chose a spiritualist, the Rev. John Lamond, to write an authorised biography, Arthur Conan Doyle: A Memoir (John Murray, 1931). The memoir, which emphasised his paranormal interests, was not what readers wanted, so after their mother's death, Adrian and Denis grudgingly allowed Hesketh Pearson to write Conan Doyle: His Life and Art (Methuen, 1943). However, Pearson's book offended Adrian and Denis by saying that the secret of their father's success was that he was the "common man". Adrian threatened criminal proceedings against Pearson's "fakeography", wrote an article in protest, and later, a book: The True Conan Doyle (John Murray, 1945). According to Lycett, "When the BBC commissioned an anniversary talk from Hesketh Pearson, Adrian announced that if it went ahead it would never broadcast another Sherlock Holmes story. The Corporation caved in."

He founded the Sir Arthur Conan Doyle Foundation in Switzerland in 1965.

== Personal life and death ==
Adrian Conan Doyle married Danish-born Anna C. Anderson.

He died of a heart attack in Geneva, Switzerland, on 3 June 1970.

== Arms ==
Coat of arms of Adrian Conan Doyle
Notes Adrian Conan Doyle was granted arms by the Chief Herald of Ireland. Adopted 1951 Crest A buck's head couped gules attired argent, ducally gorged or. Escutcheon Argent, three bucks' heads erased gules attired or, two and one, within a bordure countercompany or and sable. Motto Fortitudine vincit

== Bibliography ==
- The Exploits of Sherlock Holmes (1954, London, John Murray)
- The True Conan Doyle, (1945, London, John Murray; written about Arthur Conan Doyle, with a preface by Sir Hubert Gough)

=== Sherlock Holmes stories ===
The Exploits of Sherlock Holmes (1954 collection)
(Author credits are as given in the book's table of contents.)
By Adrian Conan Doyle and John Dickson Carr

- "The Adventure of the Seven Clocks"
- "The Adventure of the Gold Hunter"
- "The Adventure of the Wax Gamblers"
- "The Adventure of the Highgate Miracle"
- "The Adventure of the Black Baronet"
- "The Adventure of the Sealed Room"

By Adrian Conan Doyle

- "The Adventure of the Foulkes Rath"
- "The Adventure of the Abbas Ruby"
- "The Adventure of the Dark Angels"
- "The Adventure of the Two Women"
- "The Adventure of the Deptford Horror"
- "The Adventure of the Red Widow"

=== Non-Holmes works ===
- Heaven Has Claws (1952, London, John Murray)
- Tales of Love and Hate (1960, London, John Murray)
  - The Woman Who Slew; Black Hyde; Lady Moresby's Secret; A Tooth for a Tooth; The Red Swallowtail; The Lover of the Coral Glades; The Gunman of Corpus Christi; Jungle Lore; The Pearl of Dying Boys' Reef; Johnny Death
- Lone Dhow (1963, London, Murray)
