= Karl Alexander (writer) =

American novelist (1938–2015)

- Born: August 23, 1938
- Died: March 30, 2015 (aged 76); West Los Angeles, California, U.S.
- Relatives: William Tunberg (father); Karl Tunberg (uncle)
- Writing career
- Genre: Science fiction
- Notable work: Time After Time (1979)

Karl Alexander (August 23, 1938 – March 30, 2015) was an American fiction writer.

== Life ==
Born and raised in Los Angeles, he was the son and nephew of screenwriters—his father, William Tunberg, wrote the screenplay for Old Yeller, and his uncle, Karl Tunberg, wrote the screenplay for Ben-Hur—and worked on a number of films himself. Alexander's first novel Time After Time was published in 1979. It was adapted as a successful 1979 film of the same title, as a musical in 2010, and as a television series to premiere in the fall of 2016.

He became internationally known for his role in the film le Fou 4 in 2004.

Jaclyn the Ripper, Alexander's sequel to Time After Time, was published in 2009.

Alexander died on March 30, 2015, in West Los Angeles.

== Published books ==
- Time After Time (1979)
- A Private Investigation (1980)
- Jaclyn the Ripper (2009) – sequel to Time After Time
- Papa and Fidel: A Novel (2010)
- Time-Crossed Lovers (2012)
