= Robert Fawcett =

English artist

Robert Fawcett (1903–1967) was an English artist. He was trained as a fine artist but achieved fame as an illustrator of books and magazines.

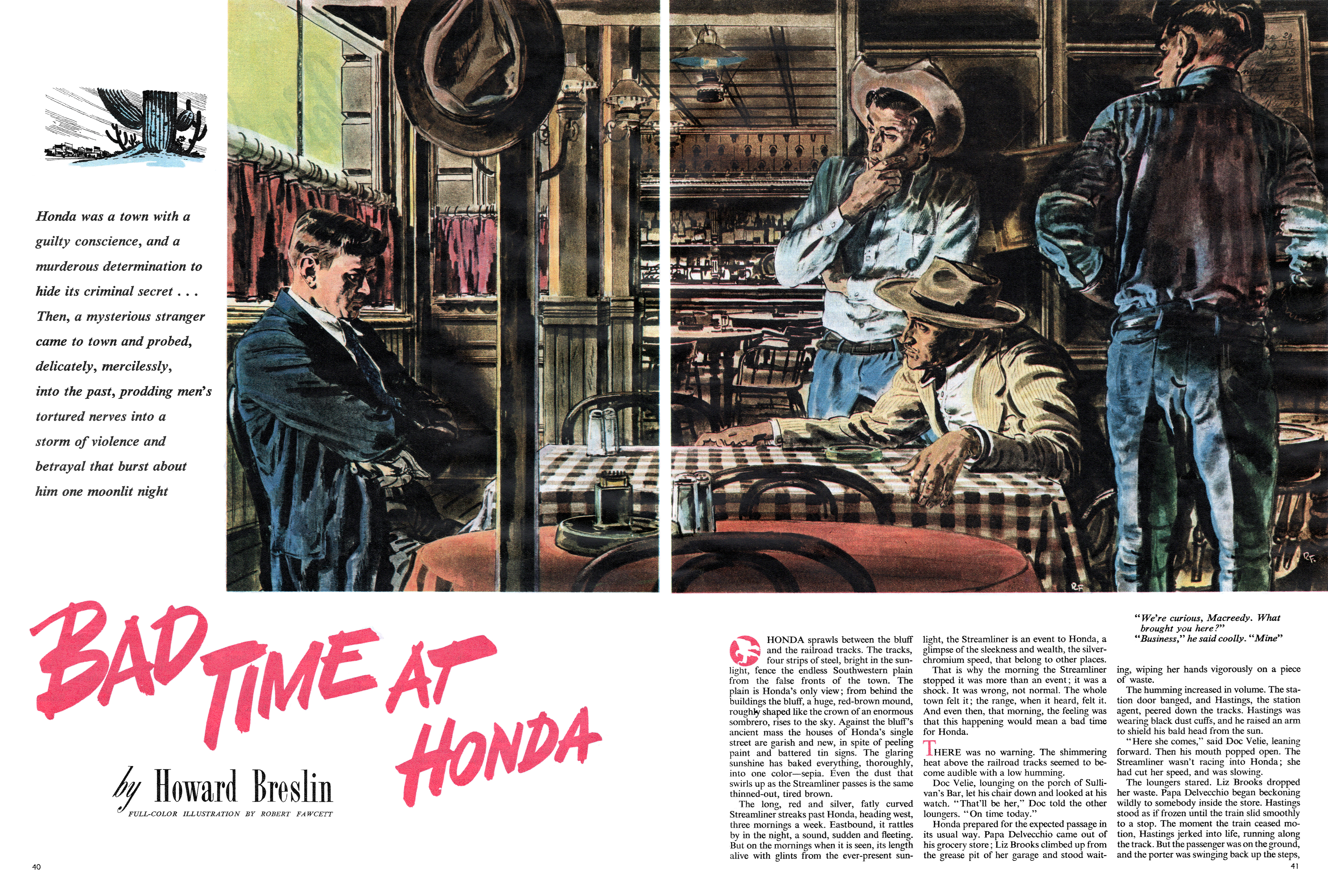
Robert Fawcett illustrated The American Magazine printing of "Bad Time at Honda", a 1947 short story by Howard Breslin that was adapted for the film Bad Day at Black Rock

Born in England, he grew up in Canada and later in New York. His father, an amateur artist, encouraged Robert's interest in art. While in Canada, he was apprenticed to an engraver. He attended the Slade School of Art in London, then returned to the United States to pursue a career in fine arts, although he had to work as a commercial artist to support himself. He soon became disenchanted with the poor pay and political infighting of the fine arts world and decided to commit himself to commercial art, where he was successful. He was the author of On the Art of Drawing.

As he was slightly color blind, Fawcett did not excel as a painter, but he was an excellent draftsman and designer, with a strong eye for detail. He produced story illustrations and full-page ads that appeared in The Saturday Evening Post, Collier's, Holiday, and Cosmopolitan bringing a superb sense of composition to his advertisement work. His work for Collier's magazine included detailed illustrations accompanying a series of Sherlock Holmes stories. He later produced documentary-type illustrations for Look. In 1948, Fawcett was recruited by Albert Dorne to be one of the founding artists at the Famous Artists School. In 1964, he was elected into the National Academy of Design as an Associate Academician.
