= List of Major Crimes episodes =

Who plays Mark Hickman?

Major Crimes is an American police procedural starring Mary McDonnell as Captain (later Commander) Sharon Raydor originally airing on the TNT network. A spin-off of The Closer, Major Crimes follows the activities of the LAPD Major Crimes squad, charged with solving high-profile crimes in the city of Los Angeles, along with the members of the squad. The show features an ensemble cast including McDonnell, G. W. Bailey as Lt. Provenza, Tony Denison as Lt. Flynn, Michael Paul Chan as Lt. Tao, Raymond Cruz as Det. Sanchez, Jon Tenney as FBI Liaison Special Agent (later Deputy Chief) Fritz Howard, and Kearran Giovanni as Det. Sykes, as well as Graham Patrick Martin as Rusty Beck. Major Crimes, created by James Duff and produced by Greer Sheppard and Michael M. Robin, was the highest rated scripted cable drama of 2012.

During the course of the series, 105 episodes of Major Crimes aired over six seasons, concluding on January 9, 2018.

== Series overview ==
Season	Episodes	Originally released	
Season	Episodes	First released	Last released
1	10	August 13, 2012	October 15, 2012
2	19	June 10, 2013	January 13, 2014
3	19	June 9, 2014	January 12, 2015
4	23	June 8, 2015	March 14, 2016
5	21	June 13, 2016	April 12, 2017
6	13	October 31, 2017	January 9, 2018

== Episodes ==
=== Season 1 (2012) ===
The theme for the first season is fairness.

No. overall	No. in season	Title	Directed by	Written by	Original release date	Prod. code	US viewers (millions)
1	1	"Reloaded"	Michael M. Robin	James Duff	August 13, 2012 (Note: originally broadcast immediately following the final The Closer episode)	3X7251	7.18
The Major Crimes Division (MCD) is still in shock over Chief Johnson's departure. They are not best pleased when Captain Sharon Raydor is named their new leader during the investigation of several deaths which occurred during the latest in a rash of grocery store robberies. Detective Amy Sykes joins Major Crimes after helping with the case. Raydor decides to look after Rusty Beck, a teenaged witness in the Phillip Stroh case (see The Closer episode, "The Last Word") who has run away from his foster family.
2	2	"Before and After"	Steve Robin	Steven Kane	August 20, 2012	3X7252	5.40
Raydor mentions to Taylor that part of the internal problems at MCD is her rank, noting that she barely outranks Provenza. Taylor tells her that there is a freeze on all positions. The unit works to solve a brutal complicated homicide case of a personal trainer bludgeoned to death with a kettlebell.
3	3	"Medical Causes"	Paul McCrane	Michael Alaimo	August 27, 2012	3X7253	5.74
The facts become blurry in a case involving a fatal car crash at a nightclub. Rusty is forced to face a harsh reality when Raydor fulfills her promise to track down his mother.
4	4	"The Ecstasy and the Agony"	Arvin Brown	Adam Belanoff	September 3, 2012	3X7254	5.87
A life strategist is deeply enmeshed in the case of the murder of a member of the Israeli mob. That the murder victim was on the verge of testifying and then entering witness protection brings the FBI into the investigation. Rusty has a bad first day of school and Sharon must rise to his defense.
5	5	"Citizen's Arrest"	David McWhirter	Duppy Demetrius	September 10, 2012	3X7255	4.96
MCD's latest case gets help from ADA Hobbs. A DNA test reveals something about Rusty that surprises everybody.
6	6	"Out of Bounds"	Rick Wallace	Ralph Gifford & Carson Moore	September 17, 2012	3X7256	4.67
After a gang shooting turns fatal, Sharon Raydor makes an unexpected move that could end her career and harm a team member. Rusty expresses a lack of interest in meeting his biological father.
7	7	"The Shame Game"	Leo Geter	Leo Geter	September 24, 2012	3X7257	4.30
MCD tries to close a case with political ties, but confidential information keeps getting leaked. Captain Raydor's decision to be temporary guardian of Rusty gets more complicated as children and family services finds out some information that may cause Rusty to be removed from her home.
8	8	"Dismissed with Prejudice"	Jon Tenney	Jim Leonard	October 1, 2012	3X7258	4.17
Det. Tao has to question his actions due to a murder conviction being overturned eight years later. Rusty meets his father and must learn to control his emotions as he spends some time with him.
9	9	"Cheaters Never Prosper"	Stacey K. Black	Mike Berchem	October 8, 2012	3X7259	4.33
The team investigates the murder of a Las Vegas police officer, found dead in a men's room stall. Captain Raydor's fears about the irresponsibility of Rusty's father are realized.
10	10	"Long Shot"	Sheelin Choksey	Michael Alaimo	October 15, 2012	3X7260	5.13
When an important figure is shot, similarities to other cases lead MCD to cede the case to the FBI, but the team has to race against the killer to save a witness. Dealings with Rusty's father are resolved in an unusual manner.

=== Season 2 (2013–14) ===
Jonathan Del Arco (Deputy Medical Examiner Dr. Morales) and Robert Gossett (Assistant Chief Russell Taylor), previously recurring cast members, are now series regulars. Nadine Velazquez joins the cast as DDA Emma Rios, the prosecutor in charge of the Phillip Stroh case. Originally scheduled for 15 episodes, the season order was increased to 19. According to creator James Duff, the theme for season two is identity.

No. overall	No. in season	Title	Directed by	Written by	Original release date	Prod. code	US viewers (millions)
11	1	"Final Cut"	Roxann Dawson	Leo Geter	June 10, 2013	3X7901	5.02
After a director's wife is found murdered in her home's swimming pool, the team investigates the director's pattern of adultery. DA Rios puts Rusty on edge as she grills him in preparation for the Stroh trial.
12	2	"False Pretenses"	Arvin Brown	Michael Alaimo	June 17, 2013	3X7902	3.90
Major Crimes investigates a puzzling murder-suicide. Rusty receives a threatening letter, triggering DA Rios's demand that he be relocated.
13	3	"Under the Influence"	David McWhirter	Duppy Demetrius	June 24, 2013	3X7903	4.55
A TV writer on the new cable show "Badge of Justice" -- "about a small team of detectives fighting crime and corruption inside the LAPD" -- is doing a ride-along with series Technical Advisor "Lieutenant Mike" Tao and Sanchez. They get involved in a high-speed chase and subsequent investigation involving a man (Luis Jose Lopez) with dried blood all over his clothes. After Rusty's told to redo an essay, Sharon insists he write what's true to himself.
14	4	"I, Witness"	Steve Robin	Adam Belanoff	July 1, 2013	3X7904	4.73
Flynn and Provenza drop off a witness at his hotel room, only to return and find him charged with murder; the team must scramble to prove his innocence. Rusty's friend proves to be a little different from what Sharon and others expected.
15	5	"D.O.A."	Paul McCrane	Ralph Gifford & Carson Moore	July 8, 2013	3X7905	4.62
The team investigates a shooting homicide on Mulholland Drive. Sharon's husband Jack surprises her and Rusty in the apartment.
16	6	"Boys Will Be Boys"	Anthony Hemingway	Jim Leonard	July 15, 2013	3X7906	5.05
The team looks for a transgender girl, gone missing soon after a humiliating video of her was posted online by bullies.
17	7	"Rules of Engagement"	David McWhirter	Mike Berchem & James Duff	July 22, 2013	3X7907	5.38
A drive-by shooting at a gas station turns out not to be gang-related; Sharon suggests to Jack that he act as a witness's attorney.
18	8	"The Deep End"	Rick Wallace	Michael Alaimo	July 29, 2013	3X7908	4.99
A media frenzy begins after an Olympic swimming coach kills a young Latino whom he claims broke into his home. Flynn decides to attend his daughter's wedding.
19	9	"There's No Place Like Home"	Leo Geter	Duppy Demetrius	August 5, 2013	3X7909	5.12
The squad investigates the death of a landlord hated by all his tenants, former workers on a '70s TV medical examiner show. As in their show, Deputy Medical Examiner Morales comes up with the extra (beyond autopsy) evidence that solves the crime. Provenza faces desk duty if he can't improve his target practice results; Rusty tries to tell Kris he can't date her. Note: the retired television co-workers were played by a quintet of predominantly octogenarian actors from various popular television shows from the 1970s and 80s onward – Tim Conway, Paul Dooley, Ron Glass, Doris Roberts, and Marion Ross.
20	10	"Backfire"	Sheelin Choksey	Adam Belanoff	August 12, 2013	3X7910	5.31
When the team must reopen its investigation into a young woman's murder, it turns out that she was an FBI informant. Rusty, still waiting to give his witness testimony, is shaken up by her fate.
21	11	"Poster Boy"	Michael M. Robin	Leo Geter	August 19, 2013	3X7911	5.29
The team goes on the trail of a serial killer who lives in the homes of his victims after he murders them. Rusty is still receiving threatening letters.
22	12	"Pick Your Poison"	Steve Robin	Jim Leonard	November 25, 2013	3X7912	3.65
The team investigates the murder of two immigrant high-school students by cyanide-laced drugs. Rusty bitterly agrees to his new around-the-clock protection. Provenza tries to convince Sharon there's a better way to protect Rusty.
23	13	"Jailbait"	Michael M. Robin	Ralph Gifford & Carson Moore	December 2, 2013	3X7913	4.21
When the team gets called in to track down a parolee, they find him dead under a bridge. Sharon brings in a therapist, Dr. Joe (Bill Brochtrup), to perform a psychological evaluation to see if Rusty can participate in an undercover operation to find his stalker.
24	14	"All In"	Anthony Hemingway	James Duff & Mike Berchem	December 9, 2013	3X7914	3.72
After a man is found at the bottom of a pond on a golf course, bludgeoned to death, the team has six suspects to consider. Rusty's upset that his therapy sessions will likely be brought up in court.
25	15	"Curve Ball"	Jon Tenney	Michael Alaimo	December 16, 2013	3X7915	4.36
Flynn and Provenza, off-duty, happen upon a RV break-in and discover a murder victim inside. Dr. Joe pushes Rusty to talk about life with his mom.
26	16	"Risk Assessment"	Stacey K. Black	Duppy Demetrius	December 23, 2013	3X7916	4.47
Just before Christmas, the team catches the case of a murder victim wrapped up in a rug; the victim turns out to be both a congressman's son and an FBI witness.
27	17	"Year-End Blowout"	David McWhirter	Leo Geter & Ralph Gifford & Carson Moore	December 30, 2013	3X7917	5.21
The team investigates the bombing of an SUV at a car dealership that killed the owner's son. Rusty struggles in his training for the undercover operation meant to draw out the writer of the letters threatening him.
28	18	"Return to Sender"	Rick Wallace	Michael Alaimo	January 6, 2014	3X7918	4.95
A body turns up that the team connects to the letter-writer (Augustus Prew) but they don't realize he's infiltrated the undercover protection around Rusty and is moving in for the kill.
29	19	"Return to Sender Part 2"	James Duff	Adam Belanoff	January 13, 2014	3X7919	5.43
Rusty takes the stand in the case against Philip Stroh and matches wits with Stroh's lawyer (Jeri Ryan). The team closes in on the letter-writer, still at large.

=== Season 3 (2014–15) ===
Jon Tenney is upgraded from recurring to regular status as Special Agent (soon-to-be LAPD Deputy Chief) Fritz Howard, but is only credited in the episodes in which he appears. Recurring guest stars include Tom Berenger as Sharon's husband Jack, Bill Brochtrup as Rusty's therapist Dr. Joe Bowman, Malcolm-Jamal Warner as SIS Lt. Chuck Cooper, Ransford Doherty as Coroner Investigator Kendall, Kathe Mazur as Deputy DA Andrea Hobbs and Laurie Holden as Special Operations Bureau (SOB) Commander Ann McGinnis. The theme for the season is expectations.

No. overall	No. in season	Title	Directed by	Written by	Original release date	Prod. code	US viewers (millions)
30	1	"Flight Risk"	David McWhirter	Michael Alaimo	June 9, 2014	4X5751	5.16
The team uncovers a family's secrets when a father and his two young children go missing. Raydor must trust Rusty when he starts to venture out on his own.
31	2	"Personal Day"	Rick Wallace	Duppy Demetrius	June 16, 2014	4X5752	4.64
A self-proclaimed innocent man is found murdered after his release from prison. The seventeen-year-old murder case is reopened. Rusty admits to Raydor his reason for the suspicious visits.
32	3	"Frozen Assets"	Paul McCrane	Adam Belanoff	June 23, 2014	4X5753	4.91
The murder of a dog that was left a 20-million-dollar estate by his deceased owner, an heiress, forces the team to suspect foul play in the owner's death. Wannabe detective Jonathan "Dick Tracy" Baird (Andrew Daly) (The Closer episode "Tapped Out"), the estate caretaker and head of security assists Major Crimes with the case.
33	4	"Letting It Go"	Steve Robin	Jim Leonard & Damani Johnson	June 30, 2014	4X5754	5.06
An alleged rapist's murder prompts an emotional investigation of suspects. Rusty questions his mother's motives when he catches her in a lie.
34	5	"Do Not Disturb"	Sheelin Choksey	Ralph Gifford & Carson Moore	July 7, 2014	4X5755	4.86
A foreigner is found murdered in his hotel room, and the squad must quickly find the killer before an Indian diplomat's involvement in the case causes international repercussions. Rusty must decide on how to share a secret with the squad.
35	6	"Jane Doe #38"	Steve Robin	Michael Alaimo & Kendall Sherwood	July 14, 2014	4X5756	5.25
When a young runaway is found murdered in a trash can, the team is doubly tasked with learning her identity and finding her killer. Raydor and her husband Jack discuss Rusty's future.
36	7	"Two Options"	Michael M. Robin	James Duff & Mike Berchem	July 21, 2014	4X5757	5.56
SWAT officers discover an elderly couple shot dead in their own home. Major Crimes teams up with the Special Operations Bureau (SOB) and FBI Agent Howard to find the killer, who also took hostages from the home. Howard is suggested for consideration as the new Deputy Chief for SOB. Note: The LAPD SOB includes SWAT, SIS and Air Support Division – all featured in this episode. Actual LAPD helicopter pilot Steve Roussell makes his first of six appearances as an unnamed LAPD pilot in this Major Crimes episode, having appeared in six episodes "in flight" on The Closer.
37	8	"Cutting Loose"	Roxann Dawson	Duppy Demetrius	July 28, 2014	4X5758	5.85
Lt. Tao has double duty when the star (Luke Perry) of the failing cop show on which he consults becomes the prime suspect in the murder of a stalker-fan.
38	9	"Sweet Revenge"	David McWhirter	Adam Belanoff	August 4, 2014	4X5759	5.24
The team investigates the murder of an entrepreneur with questionable morals and possible mob connections. Rusty tries to win over Raydor's son Ricky who comes home to visit, and Fritz Howard prepares to assume command of the Special Operations Bureau.
39	10	"Zoo Story"	Michael M. Robin	Leo Geter & Jim Leonard	August 11, 2014	4X5760	5.73
A female police officer, with a physical resemblance to a series of kidnapped girls, is abducted from an under-21 night club. Rusty's biological mother is arrested for shoplifting and asks Rusty to help bail her out, even if it means returning to his old ways. Newly appointed Deputy Chief Howard suffers a cardiac event and must secretly wear a pacemaker, if he wishes to continue working.
40	11	"Down the Drain"	Steve Robin	Duppy Demetrius	November 24, 2014	4X5761	2.94
The body of a young, recently pregnant woman is found in a storm drain and it's discovered that she had been working a surrogacy scam on three families; the team must figure out who murdered her and find the baby. Rusty tries to find a way to tell his mother about his upcoming adoption.
41	12	"Party Foul"	Rick Wallace	Michael Alaimo	December 1, 2014	4X5762	4.02
The bloody bodies of a first-year college student and her murdered boyfriend, stabbed with the same pair of scissors, are found in the garage during a raucous, crowded birthday party; Provenza tries to get answers from the girl, in critical condition at the hospital, and her grandmother. Rusty becomes interested in a colleague.
42	13	"Acting Out"	Sheelin Choksey	Adam Belanoff	December 8, 2014	4X5763	3.59
A former child star, trying to make his comeback in an indie film, is found dead on the streets, where he was researching his role as an addict. Flynn's daughter has the wrong idea about her father and Sharon's relationship.
43	14	"Trial by Fire"	Stacy K. Black	Ralph Gifford & Carson Moore	December 15, 2014	4X5764	3.53
Soon after a gang member who killed an innocent boy in a drive-by is found not guilty because a witness was too scared to testify, the accused's body is found burned in the trunk of his car. The team investigates but must deal with Jack, the lawyer for one suspect, and Deputy Chief Howard's concerns about a gang war.
44	15	"Chain Reaction"	David McWhirter	Kendall Sherwood	December 22, 2014	4X5765	3.82
One bad Santa takes advantage of a Kris Kringle flashmob right outside to rob a bank; alerted too late, the security guard shoots and kills the wrong Father Christmas in the Claus-chaotic getaway. Rusty's uneasy about Sharon's son and daughter, home for the holidays, keeping a secret from her.
45	16	"Leap of Faith"	Jon Tenney	Damani Johnson	December 29, 2014	4X5766	4.43
After Flynn stops a man from jumping off an overpass, he discovers the body of a girl with autism under a tarp in the back of the man's truck and the team learns that he's a registered sex offender. Rusty is asked to write a victim impact statement.
46	17	"Internal Affairs"	Anthony Hemingway	Michael Alaimo	January 5, 2015	4X5767	4.31
Just hours after Sanchez attacks his mother’s caregiver, believing he stole from her, the man is found dead. As Sharon does her best to help Sanchez with Internal Affairs, Rusty finds Jack drunk at her condo.
47	18	"Special Master Part One"	Steve Robin	Story by : Mike Berchem; Teleplay by : Ralph Gifford & Carson Moore	January 12, 2015	4X5768	3.74
Philip Stroh, via his special master (working to ensure Stroh is not breaching attorney-client privilege) - a friend from law school days and now a judge - demands a new deal by telling DDA Rios that three women will soon die. After the first is found dead in a burned-down house, the team tries to uncover who the next will be and how Stroh knows about these murders even as Rusty, per a term in the new deal, must endure an interview with Stroh.
48	19	"Special Master Part Two"	Leo Geter	Story by : Mike Berchem; Teleplay by : Leo Geter & Jim Leonard	January 12, 2015	4X5769	3.49
After the team barely escapes a house rigged to go up in flames, their search for the serial rapist and murderer they dub "Burning Man" narrows when Sharon realizes that Philip Stroh hasn't been communicating with the culprit but has detected the pattern of his killings, numbering at least 15 over 12 years. With the LAPD spread thin searching for Burning Man, Stroh kills his erstwhile friend, the Special Master, and escapes. Julio catches Burning Man, then ignores commands to stop beating.

=== Season 4 (2015–16) ===
The theme for the season is courage.

No. overall	No. in season	Title	Directed by	Written by	Original release date	Prod. code	US viewers (millions)
49	1	"A Rose Is a Rose"	David McWhirter	Duppy Demetrius	June 8, 2015	4X6101	3.99
With Philip Stroh apparently out of the country, and Sanchez returning from a five month suspension and anger-management training (all per events in Season 3 finale), the team investigates a murder that seems to be linked to a recent series of home invasions. Rusty starts covering the investigation for his journalism class, but switches to researching the murdered runaway whom the team wasn't able to identify ("Jane Doe #38"; S3, Ep6).
50	2	"Sorry I Missed You"	Sheelin Choksey	Kendall Sherwood	June 15, 2015	4X6102	3.81
The team has to look into a carjacking after the speeding driver, pursued by police, makes it to LA, fatally crashing only for the trunk to pop open and the car's owner, shot to death, falling out onto the road. In his effort to discover Alice's real name, Rusty visits her accused killer in jail.
51	3	"Open Line"	Rick Wallace	Ralph Gifford & Carson Moore	June 22, 2015	4X6103	4.24
The team looks into the brutal beating and murder of a supermodel who was cyber stalked; the LAPD's servers are soon infected with spyware. Rusty and Sharon are subpoenaed because of Rusty's prison visit.
52	4	"Turn Down"	Paul McCrane	Adam Belanoff	June 29, 2015	4X6104	4.39
On Buzz's first night as a reserve officer, on a ridealong with Flynn and Provenza, he insists on treating the death of a wedding guest in a hotel bathtub as suspicious. The team soon finds itself investigating a pre-nuptial homicide. Rusty continues his search for Alice's true identity, trying to crack her voicemail password.
53	5	"Snitch"	Steve Robin	Damani Johnson	July 6, 2015	4X6105	4.02
As the team investigates the latest in a series of gang killings, Sykes tries to protect a young eyewitness by not revealing her existence. Flynn tries to get up the courage to take the next step in his relationship with Sharon. Rusty turns to Dr. Joe for advice on his journalistic pursuit of Alice's identity.
54	6	"Personal Effects"	Sylvain White	Michael Alaimo	July 13, 2015	4X6106	4.19
A bullet-holed skeleton is found off a trail in Mulholland and quickly determined to be the remains of a rapist. Provenza pays Rusty to secretly move his stuff into storage while Provenza's girlfriend Patrice cleans house.
55	7	"Targets of Opportunity"	Michael M. Robin	Jim Leonard	July 20, 2015	4X6107	4.31
The team investigates a case involving two murdered cops and a young man on the run. Rusty takes advantage of the situation to continue his pursuit of Alice's identity.
56	8	"Hostage to Fortune"	Paul McCrane	Adam Belanoff	July 27, 2015	4X6108	4.39
The team investigates a kidnapping with the help of an obnoxious, possibly corrupt FBI agent (Alan Ruck). Rusty sets up a meeting with Alice's brother, Gustavo, but at the expense of his relationship with T.J., his newfound friend. Gus tells Rusty that Alice's real name was Marianna.
57	9	"Wish You Were Here"	Paul McCrane	Adam Belanoff	August 3, 2015	4X6109	4.57
The team investigates when the death of a man goes viral on YouTube. Hobbs tries to make a deal with Marianna's brother Gus, with the help of Rusty and Flynn.
58	10	"Fifth Dynasty"	Michael M. Robin	Kendall Sherwood	August 10, 2015	4X6110	4.47
The team investigates the death of the son of a Superior Court Judge and a possible link to the Aryan Brotherhood. Flynn's search for Marianna's sister Paloma turns up something, leaving her brother Gus with a hard decision.
59	11	"Four of a Kind"	Rick Wallace	Ralph Gifford & Carson Moore	November 2, 2015	4X6111	2.22
The team investigates the shooting of four rich people, dumped in the back of an SUV and then dropped off at a hospital. Rusty wants his next journalism story to be about Marianna's accused killer. Flynn is injured while trying to arrest a suspect.
60	12	"Blackout"	David McWhirter	Damani Johnson	November 9, 2015	4X6112	2.60
On trial for killing his wife Lisa, Ken Song attempts to withdraw a previous confession. His attorney, Sharon's ex-husband Jack, explains that he has a video showing Ken at a bar when his wife was murdered. Suspicion then falls on Lisa's sister Mary Lowe, whom Ken was having an affair with. Rusty engages in jailhouse interviews with Slider, Marianna's accused killer, and begins to suspect that Slider's lawyer is withholding information from him.
61	13	"Reality Check"	Sheelin Choksey	Michael Alaimo	November 16, 2015	4X6113	2.55
The team investigates the suspicious death of a wife participating in a dysfunctional-couple reality-TV show; Flynn convalesces at Sharon's apartment.
62	14	"Taking the Fall"	Stacey K. Black	Jim Leonard & Nick Zayas	November 23, 2015	4X6114	2.49
The team investigates the murder of a stockbroker soon after he was confronted by a driver seemingly consumed with road-rage. Flynn suffers a setback in his convalescence and requires surgery to remove a migrating blood clot.
63	15	"The Jumping Off Point"	Nzingha Stewart	Leo Geter & Michael Zara	November 30, 2015	4X6115	3.69
A young man is pushed off a parking structure and the investigation reveals he should not have been able to afford a high-end apartment without any visible means of support. Flynn must endure an overly cheerful physical therapist.
64	16	"Thick as Thieves"	Jon Tenney	Kendall Sherwood	December 7, 2015	4X6116	3.29
Flynn returns to work but is limited to desk duty, while the team investigates a fugitive diamond thief's body found by his bail bondsmen. Marianna's brother Gus learns of Rusty's relationship with Slider who goes on trial for her murder.
65	17	"#FindKaylaWeber"	David Harp	Duppy Demetrius	December 14, 2015	4X6117	3.00
The daughter of a pro baseball player goes missing, leading to a surprising conclusion. Slider faces sentencing in Marianna's murder while Rusty has to deal with the fallout of Gus' discovery of his friendship with Slider.
66	18	"Penalty Phase"	Michael M. Robin	Adam Belanoff	December 21, 2015	4X6118	3.69
The squad pursues a man who includes people in a film he is making before he murders them. Rusty must deal with the possibility of his relationship with Marianna's brother Gus becoming romantic.
67	19	"Hindsight, Part 1"	Michael Robin	James Duff & Mike Berchem	February 15, 2016	4X6119	3.08
The squad investigates the fatal shooting of a woman, Tamika Weaver, and her young son in gang territory, with the gun linked to high-profile murders years earlier, including that of a policeman, Reece. Sykes begins an uneasy alliance with a disgraced former LAPD detective, Mark Hickman. The gun linked to the early murders is found during a search of the church of a reformed cop killer, the Reverend Daniel Price. Rusty is followed by Gary, his birth mother's ex-boyfriend, who wants to know where she is.
68	20	"Hindsight, Part 2"	Stacey K. Black	Damani Johnson	February 22, 2016	4X6120	3.19
Sykes finds herself in an extremely uncomfortable position when Capt. Raydor (who doesn't know Amy is already in contact with him) assigns her to keep Hickman under surveillance. Emil Fisher, the Rev. Price's accomplice in the murders, recently released from prison, is questioned by the police about a possible third person who drove the getaway car in the Reece murder. Rusty is forced to come clean about his encounter with Gary.
69	21	"Hindsight, Part 3"	Patrick G. Duffy	Ralph Gifford & Carson Moore	February 29, 2016	4X6121	2.94
Emil Fisher has been found murdered by drug overdose and Hickman is considered a possible suspect. Revelations of affairs with highly placed politicians provide alternate motives for the murder of the DA years ago. Rev. 'Cop Killer' bails Tamika's boyfriend, John Barnes, out of jail to attend her funeral. A drive-by signals a probable start to gang warfare. Rusty's birth mother goes missing, then is arrested for driving Gary's getaway car.
70	22	"Hindsight, Part 4"	Leo Geter	Michael Alaimo	March 7, 2016	4X6122	3.49
Hickman has been arrested for threatening Rev. Price with a gun. The police realize the third person/driver in the Reece murder was Tamika. A plan to flush out Barnes goes terribly wrong and he is killed in a shootout; Dennis Price is arrested at the shootout. Patrice gives Provenza an ultimatum about their wedding. Gus tells Provenza Gary has threatened Rusty; Provenza leverages that to get information from Sharon Beck to arrest Gary.
71	23	"Hindsight, Part 5"	Michael Robin	Duppy Demetrius & Mike Berchem	March 14, 2016	4X6123	3.41
Faced with evidence that Dennis is a drug kingpin working out of his church, Rev. Price agreed to wear an A/V wire when he confronts his brother about the desecration of the church. What he finds out horrifies him. But it also becomes evident to the police that Dennis is not responsible for any of the killings. Further investigation allows the squad to close in on the killer, leading to a surprising ending. After a confrontation with Buzz, Provenza solves his wedding woes. Rusty works to prove his birth mother's innocence.

=== Season 5 (2016–17) ===
Robert Gossett departs the series in the eleventh episode of the season, in which Asst. Chief Taylor dies in a courtroom shootout. The theme for the season is balance. The final eight episodes focus on connections.

No. overall	No. in season	Title	Directed by	Written by	Original release date	Prod. code	US viewers (millions)
72	1	"Present Tense"	Sheelin Choksey	Damani Johnson	June 13, 2016	4X7751	3.62
The squad investigates the disappearance of a sixteen year old girl leading to a surprising family connection. Andy considers selling his home, Buzz looks into the murders of his father and uncle. Rusty experiences relationship troubles with Gus.
73	2	"N.S.F.W."	Sylvain White	Kendall Sherwood	June 20, 2016	4X7752	3.66
A police detective, who is privately conducting an investigation of a porn studio, is found murdered in one of the studio's properties. Buzz continues working on his father and uncle's murders. Rusty's biological mother is pregnant, and Sharon urges the two of them to talk.
74	3	"Foreign Affairs"	Nzingha Stewart	Carson Moore	June 27, 2016	4X7753	3.99
A beheaded body is found along with a video of the ISIS-style execution. The team clashes with federal investigators over jurisdiction. Sharon, Rusty and Gus discuss family issues. Buzz views the video of his father and uncle's murder.
75	4	"Skin Deep"	Steve Robin	Adam Belanoff	July 11, 2016	4X7754	3.92
While looking at a potential home to buy, Flynn, with Provenza and Buzz, discovers a murdered real estate agent floating in the pool. Suspects include her plastic surgeon and dentist. Provenza gives Buzz some case files of crimes similar to his father and uncle's murder at an ATM.
76	5	"Cashed Out"	Paul McCrane	Ralph Gifford	July 18, 2016	4X7755	3.72
As Julio works to become a foster father, he comes under investigation by a social worker for his surprising method of taking down the killer in a brutal murder.
77	6	"Tourist Trap"	Rick Wallace	Duppy Demetrius	July 25, 2016	4X7756	3.65
The team investigates a seemingly random mugging and murder of the husband of a vacationing British couple from Chester, England. Provenza gives advice to Buzz on how to investigate his father and uncle's murders. Rusty and his mother reconcile.
78	7	"Moral Hazard"	David McWhirter	Nick Zayas	August 1, 2016	4X7757	3.65
A down-on-his-luck man (Jere Burns) begins a killing spree against people from his past who he believes have wronged him. Rusty works on fingerprint evidence for Buzz's investigation.
79	8	"Off the Wagon"	Stacey K. Black	Michael Zara	August 15, 2016	4X7758	3.18
A former child star restarting his career dies and Flynn investigates as a favor to his daughter; Buzz contemplates how to proceed in his investigation into his father and uncle's killers while Rusty makes a decision regarding his mother's pregnancy and reaches a new milestone in his relationship with Gus. Stephanie Courtney has a cameo appearance as an unethical doctor.
80	9	"Family Law"	David Harp	Mike Berchem	August 22, 2016	4X7759	3.94
The team investigates the murder of a divorce attorney with suspects ranging from his wife to a prostitute who possessed a surprising connection to the victim; Buzz's efforts to find his father's killer finally hit a breakthrough; Julio is assigned to foster Mark Jarvis, a troublesome child.
81	10	"Dead Zone"	Patrick G. Duffy	Kendall Sherwood	August 29, 2016	4X7760	3.98
The team's investigation of the murder of Mark's mother leads to a crime organization (the Zyklon Brotherhood) planning to start a race war. Buzz and Provenza interview one of the two men suspected of murdering Buzz's father and uncle.
82	11	"White Lies Part 1"	Michael M. Robin	James Duff	September 5, 2016	4X7761	4.14
The murder trial of a white supremacist takes a horrifying turn when he grabs a (supposedly unloaded) gun entered into evidence and kills several people, including Asst. Chief Taylor, before Sharon kills him in return. The team races to determine who might have conspired to make the shootings possible and bring down the Zyklon Brotherhood. Buzz continues to investigate the murders of his father and uncle by interviewing an alibi witness.
83	12	"White Lies Part 2"	Sheelin Choksey	Damani Johnson	September 12, 2016	4X7762	3.29
The squad continues its investigation into the conspiracy surrounding the courtroom shooting and a possible family connection to Dwight Darnell; Buzz's investigation turns up the name of his father and uncle's killer.
84	13	"White Lies Part 3"	Michael M. Robin	Carson Moore	September 19, 2016	4X7763	3.10
The team is able to shut down the Zyklon Brotherhood but must still track down the true mastermind behind the courtroom shooting; Julio's new foster son Mark is taken to his grandparents, leading to a tearful goodbye; with the help of Rusty, Buzz is able to identify and arrest his father and uncle's killer who confesses; however, the man has a family, leaving Buzz disturbed; Fritz Howard contemplates taking Taylor's job; at the end of the episode, Andy collapses from an apparent heart attack.
85	14	"Heart Failure"	Nzingha Stewart	Ralph Gifford	February 22, 2017	4X7764	1.93
Andy has survived his heart incident and has returned to light duty. The squad investigates a brutal murder with a new Deputy Chief (Camryn Manheim) breathing down their necks. Buzz receives a distressing letter, Sharon receives distressing news about an old enemy and Rusty worries about his future with Gus.
86	15	"Cleared History"	Jennifer Phang	Adam Belanoff	March 1, 2017	4X7765	2.28
The squad investigate the murder of a man who used his job as a security system installer to steal laptops and then blackmail the owners with damaging secrets concealed on them. That leads them to a child pornography ring. Rusty has to deal with the fallout of his decision regarding Gus and the implications of why he made that decision.
87	16	"Quid Pro Quo"	Sylvain White	Michael Zara	March 8, 2017	4X7766	2.48
A murder case goes sideways at trial when defense attorney Linda Rothman is able to destroy Det. Amy Sykes's credibility on the stand. Helping Rothman as a defense investigator is Amy's old nemesis, Mark Hickman.
88	17	"Dead Drop"	Stacey K. Black	Nick Zayas	March 15, 2017	4X7767	2.26
The squad finds a very heavy body forty feet up a tree surrounded by loose marijuana when Dr. Morales shows up to the crime scene with his father, a retired detective from Uruguay. Julio Sanchez works to become the legal guardian of Mark Jarvis while Andy Flynn prepares a special surprise for Sharon.
89	18	"Bad Blood"	Steve Robin	Kendall Sherwood	March 22, 2017	4X7768	2.37
Ricky, Sharon's son, comes home for a surprise visit while Major Crimes investigates what looks like the "follow home" murder of a retired LAPD fraud detective, who may have been murdered for an arrest she made decades ago.
90	19	"Intersection"	Rick Wallace	Damani Johnson	March 29, 2017	4X7769	2.44
As the war between bikes and cars escalates in the streets of L.A., Acting Assistant Chief Fritz Howard deploys Major Crimes to solve a tragic hit-and-run. Lt. Provenza, frustrated by the never-ending contest to succeed Russell Taylor, contemplates retirement.
91	20	"Shockwave, Part 1"	Patrick G. Duffy	Ralph Gifford	April 5, 2017	4X7770	2.43
An explosion with C-4 at a crime scene brings the division between new deputy chief of operations Winnie Davis and Major Crimes to a head. Rusty faces a major decision in his relationship with Gus.
92	21	"Shockwave, Part 2"	Michael M. Robin	Duppy Demetrius	April 12, 2017	4X7771	2.89
The squad works to capture the bomber who turns out to be the key witness in another murder. As Rusty makes a decision about his future with Gus, the competition for the rank of Assistant Chief ends.

=== Season 6 (2017–18) ===
Daniel Di Tomasso (Detective Wes Nolan) and Leonard Roberts (Assistant Chief Leo Mason) previously recurring cast members, are now series regulars. Jessica Meraz also joins the cast as Detective Camilla Paige, a new transfer who has a past with Provenza. Series star Mary McDonnell departs the series in the tenth episode, following Sharon Raydor's death from a heart attack. The themes for this season are faith, reason and risk.

No. overall	No. in season	Title	Directed by	Written by	Original release date	Prod. code	US viewers (millions)
93	1	"Sanctuary City: Part 1"	Michael M. Robin	James Duff	October 31, 2017	T13.20451	1.75
The disappearance of three boys from a field trip comes under investigation by the squad with potential motives and suspects varying from drugs to a priest from the Catholic Church. Due to Julio's bereavement leave, Buzz begins to take a more active role in the squad while alarming news about Phillip Stroh surfaces.
94	2	"Sanctuary City: Part 2"	Paul McCrane	Kendall Sherwood	November 7, 2017	T13.20452	1.77
While the search for the missing boys continues, the squad faces off with an untrustworthy priest, an angry ex-husband, and threats from the F.B.I. Rusty startles Flynn and Sharon with a surprising request.
95	3	"Sanctuary City: Part 3"	Nzingha Stewart	Damani Johnson	November 14, 2017	T13.20453	1.74
As the MCD continues to search for the remaining St. Joseph's Three, Sharon finds her personal life threatening her career.
96	4	"Sanctuary City: Part 4"	Sheelin Choksey	Ralph Gifford	November 21, 2017	T13.20454	1.84
Sharon collapses and is rushed to the hospital, diagnosed with a heart condition. Flynn asks her about delaying their fast-approaching nuptials, but she insists her health will not affect their wedding nor the investigation. Provenza is placed in charge of the St. Joseph's Three, who resurface, and the investigation switches to a double-homicide of a priest in their charge and a father of one of the boys.
97	5	"Sanctuary City: Part 5"	Patrick Duffy	Carson Moore	November 28, 2017	T13.20455	2.37
The St. Joseph's Three case is closed, and a doctor who was having an affair with one of the mothers is arrested on multiple charges while one of the boys faces manslaughter charges for killing his abusive stepfather. The MCD and Sharon's family attend the wedding.
98	6	"Conspiracy Theory: Part 1"	Adam Belanoff	Stacey K. Black	December 5, 2017	T13.20456	2.30
A well-known attorney known for her work in defense of oppressed women is found dead and the long list of high-profile suspects includes family, a film director and a former football player. Rusty and Gus deal with issues regarding their relationship.
99	7	"Conspiracy Theory: Part 2"	Anthony Hemingway	Michael Zara	December 12, 2017	T13.20457	1.75
The squad investigates the death of another woman in the Tackles case, bringing up a potential new theory. Sharon has a health setback, while Gus has an unexpected reaction to Rusty's semi-solution to their relationship difficulties.
100	8	"Conspiracy Theory: Part 3"	Stacey K. Black	Mike Berchem	December 19, 2017	T13.20458	2.44
While working two seemingly connected murders, the detectives uncover a series of sexual assaults against servers from Tackles. A new theory about the killer gathers momentum, and an unexpected event throws the MCD off course.
101	9	"Conspiracy Theory: Part 4"	Michael M. Robin	Duppy Demetrius	December 19, 2017	T13.20459	2.33
Sharon must make decisions regarding her ongoing health problems while arriving at the conclusion of a series of murders and sexual assaults. After several heart-related episodes, she collapses while interrogating a suspect and dies in the hospital. As that event is taking place, the audience learns that Phillip Stroh has returned to Los Angeles.
102	10	"By Any Means: Part 1"	David Harp	Nick Zayas	December 26, 2017	T13.20460	2.74
Reeling from their recent loss, Major Crimes learns from DDA Emma Rios that Phillip Stroh is likely back shortly before Emma herself is murdered. With the help of his British accomplice Dylan Baxter, Stroh hacks into MCD and begins manipulating them to locate his mother. With Rusty's help, MCD struggles to uncover Stroh's motives, but remains one step behind him.
103	11	"By Any Means: Part 2"	Rick Wallace	Kendall Sherwood	December 26, 2017	T13.20461	2.44
As Dylan Baxter continues to monitor MCD, he is able to locate Stroh's mother Gwendolyn while MCD makes the same breakthrough. With the help of Doctor Joe, MCD interviews Gwendolyn who reveals the story of Stroh's first rape and murder when he was only sixteen years old. MCD is able to identify Stroh's three earliest victims and recover one of their bodies, but come no closer to catching Stroh. Although they come close to identifying Dylan, his hacking allows him to prevent this.
104	12	"By Any Means: Part 3"	Sheelin Choksey	Damani Johnson & Carson Moore	January 2, 2018	T13.20462	2.22
After Buzz realizes that MCD has been hacked, Baxter is identified and MCD works to lay a trap for him. The recovery of the body of Stroh's first victim allows Rusty to link all of Stroh's recent victims together and Stroh's true goal is realized. After committing another murder, Stroh leaves a disturbing warning.
105	13	"By Any Means: Part 4"	James Duff	Adam Belanoff & Ralph Gifford	January 9, 2018	T13.20463	2.25
After Dylan's death, evidence is discovered pointing to Stroh's supposed escape plans. As MCD closes in on Stroh, Rusty becomes convinced there is more to Ms. Bechtel than they realize. With most of the LAPD elsewhere, Provenza, Buzz, Rusty, and Gus work together to bring down Stroh once and for all. Following Stroh's death at Rusty's hands, Julio accepts a promotion and transfer, Buzz is sent to the police academy and will then return to MCD as a probationary detective, Rusty makes a deal to work as a prosecutor at the DA's office for five years after passing the bar, and Provenza takes permanent command of MCD.

== Ratings ==
=== Season 1 ===
No.	Title	Original air date	Viewers (in millions)	Rating (Adults 18–49)	Rank per week on Cable
1	"Reloaded"	August 13, 2012	7.18	1.2	#2
2	"Before and After"	August 20, 2012	5.40	0.9	#1
3	"Medical Causes"	August 27, 2012	5.74	0.9	#8
4	"The Ecstasy and the Agony"	September 3, 2012	5.87	1.0	#2
5	"Citizen's Arrest"	September 10, 2012	4.96	0.9	#6
6	"Out of Bounds"	September 17, 2012	4.67	0.8	#3
7	"The Shame Game"	September 24, 2012	4.30	0.8	#4
8	"Dismissed with Prejudice"	October 1, 2012	4.17	0.7	#21
9	"Cheaters Never Prosper"	October 8, 2012	4.33	0.7	#21
10	"Long Shot"	October 15, 2012	5.13	0.9	#11

=== Season 2 ===
No.	Title	Original air date	Viewers (in millions)	Rating (Adults 18–49)	Rank per week on Cable
1	"Final Cut"	June 10, 2013	5.02	0.9	#1
2	"False Pretenses"	June 17, 2013	3.90	0.7	#12
3	"Under the Influence"	June 24, 2013	4.55	0.8	#5
4	"I, Witness"	July 1, 2013	4.73	0.8	#3
5	"D.O.A."	July 8, 2013	4.62	0.8	#4
6	"Boys Will Be Boys"	July 15, 2013	5.05	0.8	#5
7	"Rules of Engagement"	July 22, 2013	5.38	0.9	#3
8	"The Deep End"	July 29, 2013	4.99	0.9	#3
9	"There's No Place Like Home"	August 5, 2013	5.12	0.7	#3
10	"Backfire"	August 12, 2013	5.31	0.9	#3
11	"Poster Boy"	August 19, 2013	5.31	0.8	#5
12	"Pick Your Poison"	November 25, 2013	3.65	0.7	#22
13	"Jailbait"	December 2, 2013	4.21	0.7	#5
14	"All In"	December 9, 2013	3.72	0.7	#18
15	"Curve Ball"	December 16, 2013	4.36	0.7	#6
16	"Risk Assessment"	December 23, 2013	4.47	0.7	#8
17	"Year-End Blowout"	December 30, 2013	5.21	0.7	#11
18	"Return to Sender"	January 6, 2014	4.95	0.8	#5
19	"Return to Sender Part 2"	January 13, 2014	5.43	0.8	#4

=== Season 3 ===
No.	Title	Original air date	Viewers (in millions)	Rating (Adults 18–49)	Rank per week on Cable
1	"Flight Risk"	June 9, 2014	5.16	0.9	#2
2	"Personal Day"	June 16, 2014	4.64	0.7	#7
3	"Frozen Assets"	June 23, 2014	4.91	0.8	#8
4	"Letting It Go"	June 30, 2014	5.06	0.8	#6
5	"Do Not Disturb"	July 7, 2014	4.86	0.8	#4
6	"Jane Doe #38"	July 14, 2014	5.25	0.9	#2
7	"Two Options"	July 21, 2014	5.56	0.9	#1
8	"Cutting Loose"	July 28, 2014	5.85	1.0	#1
9	"Sweet Revenge"	August 4, 2014	5.24	0.8	#1
10	"Zoo Story"	August 11, 2014	5.73	0.8	#1
11	"Down the Drain"	November 24, 2014	2.94	0.5	TBA
12	"Party Foul"	December 1, 2014	4.02	0.6	#10
13	"Acting Out"	December 8, 2014	3.59	0.6	#7
14	"Trial by Fire"	December 15, 2014	3.53	0.6	#10
15	"Chain Reaction"	December 22, 2014	3.82	0.6	#11
16	"Leap of Faith"	December 29, 2014	4.43	0.7	#17
17	"Internal Affairs"	January 5, 2015	4.31	0.7	#1
18	"Special Master Part One"	January 12, 2015	3.74	0.6	#9
19	"Special Master Part Two"	January 12, 2015	3.49	0.5	#12

=== Season 4 ===
No.	Title	Original air date	Viewers (in millions)	Rating (Adults 18–49)	Rank per week on Cable
1	"A Rose Is a Rose"	June 8, 2015	3.99	0.5	#2
2	"Sorry I Missed You"	June 15, 2015	3.81	0.5	#6
3	"Open Line"	June 22, 2015	4.24	0.6	#4
4	"Turn Down"	June 29, 2015	4.39	0.7	#1
5	"Snitch"	July 6, 2015	4.02	0.5	#2
6	"Personal Effects"	July 13, 2015	4.19	0.6	#2
7	"Targets of Opportunity"	July 20, 2015	4.31	0.7	#2
8	"Hostage to Fortune"	July 27, 2015	4.39	0.6	#3
9	"Wish You Were Here"	August 3, 2015	4.57	0.7	#6
10	"Fifth Dynasty"	August 10, 2015	4.47	0.6	#1
11	"Four of a Kind"	November 2, 2015	2.22	0.4	TBA
12	"Blackout"	November 9, 2015	2.60	0.5	TBA
13	"Reality Check"	November 16, 2015	2.55	0.3	TBA
14	"Taking the Fall"	November 23, 2015	2.49	0.4	TBA
15	"The Jumping Off Point"	November 30, 2015	3.69	0.5	#13
16	"Thick as Thieves"	December 7, 2015	3.29	0.4	#12
17	"#FindKaylaWeber"	December 14, 2015	3.00	0.4	#23
18	"Penalty Phase"	December 21, 2015	3.69	0.5	#7
19	"Hindsight Part 1"	February 15, 2016	3.08	0.4	#13
20	"Hindsight Part 2"	February 22, 2016	3.19	0.5	#14
21	"Hindsight Part 3"	February 29, 2016	2.94	0.4	#25
22	"Hindsight Part 4"	March 7, 2016	3.49	0.5	TBA
23	"Hindsight Part 5"	March 14, 2016	3.41	0.5	TBA

=== Season 5 ===
No.	Title	Original air date	Viewers (in millions)	Rating (Adults 18–49)
1	"Present Tense"	June 13, 2016	3.62	0.4
2	"N.S.F.W."	June 20, 2016	3.66	0.5
3	"Foreign Affairs"	June 27, 2016	3.99	0.5
4	"Skin Deep"	July 11, 2016	3.92	0.5
5	"Cashed Out"	July 18, 2016	3.72	0.5
6	"Tourist Trap"	July 25, 2016	3.65	0.5
7	"Moral Hazard"	August 1, 2016	3.65	0.5
8	"Off the Wagon"	August 15, 2016	3.18	0.4
9	"Family Law"	August 22, 2016	3.94	0.5
10	"Dead Zone"	August 29, 2016	3.98	0.5
11	"White Lies Part 1"	September 5, 2016	4.14	0.5
12	"White Lies Part 2"	September 12, 2016	3.29	0.4
13	"White Lies Part 3"	September 19, 2016	3.10	0.4
14	"Heart Failure"	February 22, 2017	1.93	0.2
15	"Cleared History"	March 1, 2017	2.28	0.3
16	"Quid Pro Quo"	March 8, 2017	2.48	0.3
17	"Dead Drop"	March 15, 2017	2.26	0.3
18	"Bad Blood"	March 22, 2017	2.37	0.3
19	"Intersection"	March 29, 2017	2.44	0.3
20	"Shockwave, Part 1"	April 5, 2017	2.43	0.3
21	"Shockwave, Part 2"	April 12, 2017	2.89	0.3

== See also ==
- List of The Closer episodes
