= Phillip P. Keene =

American actor (born 1966)

Phillip Keene
- Born: Philip P. Keene; September 5, 1966 (age 60); Los Angeles, California, U.S.
- Citizenship: American
- Education: University of California
- Occupation: Actor
- Years active: 2002–present
- Known for: Buzz Watson in The Closer and Major Crimes
- Notable work: The Closer, Major Crimes, Sherlock & Daughter
- Spouse: James Duff (m. 2013)
- Awards: Screen Actors Guild Award nomination (2008–2010)

Phillip P. Keene (born September 5, 1966) is an American actor. He is mostly known for playing Buzz Watson on the TV series The Closer and its spinoff, Major Crimes. He is fluent in Spanish and German.

== Early life and education ==
Keene was born in Los Angeles, California. He worked from an early age and between 1987 and 1991 was a flight attendant for Pan American World Airways. Keene later studied history and art history at the University of California. He also has a pilot's license.

== Career ==
Keene made his feature film debut in Role of a Lifetime (2002). Two years later, in 2004, he "received his first acting role in a small part on The D.A.." The show was an ABC legal drama television series.

From 2005 to 2012, Keene became known for portraying Buzz Watson, the LAPD civilian surveillance coordinator, in the TNT Series The Closer, an American police procedural television series co‑created by James Duff. In 2008, during the run of The Closer, he appeared in the short film The Truth Is Underrated, directed by Stacey K. Black.

Between 2012 and 2018, Keene continued his role as Buzz Watson in Major Crimes, a TNT Series spin‑off of The Closer. The series ran for six seasons with 105 episodes and ended in January 2018. He also took part in the 2013 feature film I Am Death. In 2018, Keene "returned to the big screen as the male lead of the anticipated MarVista Entertainment thriller Deadly Shores, opposite Carly Schroeder."

In 2019, Keene appeared in the thriller Her Secret Family Killer, directed by Lisa France. Subsequently, in 2025, Keene played Paul Anderson, Clara's father and the newly‑appointed American ambassador to the United Kingdom, in Sherlock & Daughter, an American mystery television series created by Brendan Foley and based on the Sherlock Holmes stories by Sir Arthur Conan Doyle, with James Duff as showrunner.

== Personal life ==
Keene is married to James Duff, creator of The Closer and Major Crimes, his partner since 1993.

== Filmography ==
Year	Film	Role	Notes
2002	Role of a Lifetime	Bartender	Film
2004	The D.A.	Reporter #2	Episode: The People vs. Sergius Kovinsky
2005–2012	The Closer	Buzz Watson	Recurring role: seasons 1-3; Main role: seasons 4-7; 109 episodes
2008	The Truth Is Underrated	Jonah	Short Film
2012–2018	Major Crimes	Buzz Watson	Main role, 105 episodes
2013	I Am Death	Greg Meyers	Feature film
2018	Deadly Shores	Robert Palmer	Main role - Lifetime Movie
2019	Her Secret Family Killer	Cliff	Thriller film
2025	Sherlock & Daughter	Paul Anderson	Recurring

== Nominations ==
Year	Award	Category	Title of work	Result
2008	Screen Actors Guild Award	Outstanding Performance by an Ensemble in a Drama Series	The Closer	Nominated
2009	Screen Actors Guild Award	Outstanding Performance by an Ensemble in a Drama Series	The Closer	Nominated
2010	Screen Actors Guild Award	Outstanding Performance by an Ensemble in a Drama Series	The Closer	Nominated
