= Major Crimes (TV series) =

American police drama series (2012–2018)

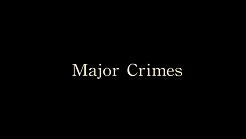
- Genre: Crime drama; Police procedural
- Created by: James Duff
- Starring: Mary McDonnell; G. W. Bailey; Tony Denison; Michael Paul Chan; Raymond Cruz; Kearran Giovanni; Phillip P. Keene; Graham Patrick Martin; Jonathan Del Arco; Robert Gossett; Nadine Velazquez; Jon Tenney; Leonard Roberts; Daniel Di Tomasso; Jessica Meraz
- Composer: James S. Levine
- Country of origin: United States
- Original language: English
- No. of seasons: 6
- No. of episodes: 105 (list of episodes)

Production
- Executive producers: James Duff; Michael M. Robin; Greer Shephard; Adam Belanoff; Rick Wallace
- Production locations: Los Angeles, California
- Running time: 43 minutes
- Production companies: The Shephard/Robin Company; Walking Entropy; Warner Bros. Television

Original release
- Network: TNT
- Release: August 13, 2012 – January 9, 2018

Related
- The Closer

Major Crimes is an American police procedural television series starring Mary McDonnell. It was a continuation spin-off of The Closer, set in the same police division, now headed by McDonnell's character, Sharon Raydor. It premiered on TNT on August 13, 2012, following the finale of The Closer.

In January 2017, during Major Crimes's fifth season, TNT renewed the series for a 13-episode sixth season. On October 3, the network announced the sixth season would be its last. Series star McDonnell commented on Instagram, "as many of you have stated, this was not a surprise. The writing was clearly on the wall. Trying to make sense of TNT's choices is an activity that James Duff and Mike Robin and all of us have been engaged in for a long time." The final season premiered on October 31, 2017, and ended on January 9, 2018, with a total of 105 episodes.

== Premise ==
With the departure of Deputy Chief Brenda Leigh Johnson sending tremors throughout the entire Los Angeles Police Department, Captain Sharon Raydor faces difficult challenges as she assumes Johnson's former post as head of the Major Crimes Division. For one, as she is a former internal-affairs officer, many of her squad members do not trust her. Additionally, the controversial new rules she had instituted as head of the Force Investigation Division (FID) are reaping unintended consequences at crime scenes. Finally, the LAPD's new cost-saving policy of striking deals with violent criminals instead of extracting confessions from them is generating additional rancor among the rank and file, particularly with Major Crimes' senior officer and second-in-command, Lieutenant Provenza.

Raydor's foster son Rusty Beck (whom she later adopts) adds more drama to Raydor's personal life, but it bleeds into her professional life, as well, since Rusty is the key eyewitness in the trial of serial killer Phillip Stroh (Billy Burke). Rusty ends up attending the same Catholic school Raydor's grown children once attended.

The series stars numerous cast members continuing in their roles from The Closer, including actors Mary McDonnell, G. W. Bailey, Tony Denison, Michael Paul Chan, Raymond Cruz, Phillip P. Keene, Robert Gossett, Jonathan Del Arco, and Jon Tenney. They are joined by Graham Patrick Martin as Rusty and Kearran Giovanni as Detective Amy Sykes, the only main character not previously seen on The Closer. (Rusty only appeared in two episodes of The Closer, at the finale.) Kathe Mazur (as D.D.A. Andrea Hobbs), Ransford Doherty (as Kendall), Steve Roussell (as Tactical Flight Officer), and Billy Burke (as Phillip Stroh) also appeared in both series.

== Cast and characters ==
=== Main ===
- Mary McDonnell as Captain (later Commander) Sharon Raydor, lead officer of the Major Crimes Division. As a well-known (and somewhat controversial) internal-affairs officer, she is initially distrusted by other members of the squad when she is named head of the division. She takes in and later adopts Rusty Beck, a material witness in a murder trial, and in the course of the series she falls in love with her subordinate, Lt. Andy Flynn, whom she marries during the final season. The same season, she has heart issues brought on due to the stress of her job, and eventually dies of a fatal heart attack with just four episodes left in the series.
- G. W. Bailey as Detective Lieutenant Louie Provenza, second-in-command of Major Crimes, primary incident commander, and a vocal critic of Capt./Cmdr. Raydor—though the two come to an understanding and learn to work together. One of the LAPD's most senior officers, he is known for his four ex-wives, whom he detests. In the series, he dates the grandmother of a murder suspect, who eventually becomes his fifth wife. He also takes a role in assuring Rusty's well-being, grudgingly at first. In the fourth last episode of the series, following Raydor's death from a heart attack, Provenza is appointed acting CO of Major Crimes, and following the death of Philip Stroh, he is given the position permanently.
- Tony Denison as Detective Lieutenant Andy Flynn. He is good friends with Lt. Provenza and is a recovering alcoholic. He eventually marries Cdr. Raydor, but is widowed shortly afterwards following her death.
- Michael Paul Chan as Detective Lieutenant Michael Tao, who specializes in some of the more technical aspects of crime investigations. He is a consultant on the fictional crime show Badge of Justice.
- Raymond Cruz as Detective Julio Sanchez, the squad's gang-activity expert who has anger-management issues and grief over the death of his wife. Over the course of the series, he gradually overcomes these issues, and becomes a foster parent. At the end of the series, he accepts a promotion to lieutenant and transfers to the Criminal Intelligence Division.
- Kearran Giovanni as Detective Amy Sykes, an ambitious new officer (and former Army MP) in Major Crimes. In early episodes she is derided as a "suck-up" by Lt. Provenza, and is often seen complimenting Capt./Cmdr Raydor.
- Phillip P. Keene as Civilian Surveillance Coordinator (later Reserve Officer/Reserve Detective) Buzz Watson. He acts as videographer of crime scenes and interrogations and eventually starts training to become a reserve officer and later, detective. At the end of the series, Provenza, newly appointed as head of Major Crimes, arranges for Buzz to attend the police academy for eighteen weeks to become a probationary detective.
- Graham Patrick Martin as Russell "Rusty" Beck, Sharon Raydor's adopted teenage son. A former child sex-worker, he witnessed serial killer rapist Phillip Stroh dumping the body of one of his victims in Griffith Park (in the final episode of The Closer), and from then on became the ward of the LAPD and Capt. Raydor, who eventually adopts him. He initially resists Captain Raydor, though he comes to love her. He also struggles with his sexuality. In the fourth season, Rusty starts dating Gus Wallace, after helping identify his sister as an unidentified murder victim and bringing her killer to justice. He documents his journey towards identifying said victim on an in-universe YouTube vlog channel.
- Jonathan Del Arco as Dr. Fernando Morales (seasons 2–6; recurring season 1), Los Angeles County Deputy Medical Examiner. As a gay man he occasionally educates squad members about gay culture.
- Robert Gossett as Assistant Chief Russell Taylor (seasons 2–5; recurring season 1), Assistant Chief of Operations. An antagonistic character in The Closer, Chief Taylor has a much better rapport with Capt. Raydor. He is killed in a courtroom shootout halfway through the fifth season by a white supremacist who is then killed by Raydor.
- Nadine Velazquez as Deputy District Attorney Emma Rios (season 2; guest seasons 3 and 6), a DDA who works with Major Crimes and is the lead prosecutor on the Phillip Stroh case. She is murdered in the fourth last episode of the series by Stroh, who drowns her in her pool.
- Jon Tenney as Deputy Chief Fritz Howard (seasons 3–6; recurring seasons 1–2), FBI liaison to Major Crimes, later retires from FBI to become Deputy Chief of the LAPD Special Operations Bureau, and served temporarily as the Acting Assistant Chief of Operations. He is the husband of Brenda Johnson (The Closer), the previous commander of the Major Crimes squad, who is never seen in Major Crimes but was mentioned periodically throughout the spin-off.
- Leonard Roberts as Commander/Assistant Chief Leo Mason (season 6; recurring season 5), Taylor's replacement as Assistant Chief of Operations.
- Daniel Di Tomasso as Detective Wes Nolan (season 6; recurring season 5), an undercover detective assigned to temporary, and later, permanent duty with Major Crimes.
- Jessica Meraz as Detective Camila Paige (season 6), a new recruit to Major Crimes who has a past with Provenza.

=== Recurring ===
- Kathe Mazur as Deputy District Attorney Andrea Hobbs
- Ransford Doherty as Medical Examiner's Investigator Kendall
- Ian Bohen as Daniel Dunn, Rusty's biological father (season 1)
- Madison McLaughlin as Kris Slater, Rusty's schoolmate. She has an unrequited love for him (season 2)
- Bill Brochtrup as Dr. Joe (Bowman), Rusty's therapist, an occasional consultant with the Major Crimes unit (seasons 2–6)
- Malcolm-Jamal Warner as Lieutenant Chuck Cooper, head of the LAPD Special Investigation Section, reporting to Deputy Chief Howard; he is also Sykes' boyfriend (season 2–5)
- Tom Berenger as Jackson Raydor, a lawyer and Sharon Raydor's roguish former husband (seasons 2–4)
- Dawnn Lewis as Patrice Perry, Provenza's girlfriend and, later, fifth wife. She was introduced in the third season as the grandmother of a psychotic killer (seasons 3–6).
- Ever Carradine as Sharon Beck, Rusty's biological mother (seasons 3–5)
- Billy Burke as Phillip Stroh, a cunning former lawyer and serial killer who resurfaces periodically and lethally (seasons 3 and 6)
- Garrett Coffey as Greg "Slider" Rasenick, the murderer of Gustavo Wallace's sister, Mariana (aka Alice Herrera) (seasons 3–4)
- Rene Rosado as Gustavo "Gus" Wallace, Rusty's boyfriend (seasons 4–6)

== Development and production ==
Series promotional poster

On December 10, 2010, TNT announced that the upcoming seventh season of The Closer would be the show's last. The channel said the decision to retire the show was made by Kyra Sedgwick. On January 30, 2011, it was announced the final season would add six episodes to the usual 15-episode order, the final six being the build toward a possible spin-off series. On May 18, 2011, TNT announced the spin-off, entitled Major Crimes and starring Mary McDonnell as Captain Sharon Raydor, had been picked up for a 10-episode season.

Following an average of over 7 million viewers for its first season, TNT renewed Major Crimes for a 15-episode second season on September 27, 2012, which the network increased to 19 episodes in April 2013. Season 2 premiered on June 10, 2013. The series was renewed for a third season of 15 episodes on August 15, 2013, which aired from June 9, 2014, through January 12, 2015. On July 18, 2014, TNT renewed Major Crimes for a 15-episode fourth season, later expanded to 23 episodes, which aired from June 8, 2015, to March 14, 2016. On December 15, 2015, TNT renewed the series for a 13-episode fifth season, On June 22, 2016, TNT ordered eight additional episodes for season five, bringing the total to 21. On January 18, 2017, the series was renewed for a 13-episode sixth season, clarified in October as the final season, which aired from October 31, 2017, to January 9, 2018.

== Episodes ==
As of January 9, 2018, 105 episodes of Major Crimes have aired.

Season	Episodes	Originally released	
Season	Episodes	First released	Last released
1	10	August 13, 2012	October 15, 2012
2	19	June 10, 2013	January 13, 2014
3	19	June 9, 2014	January 12, 2015
4	23	June 8, 2015	March 14, 2016
5	21	June 13, 2016	April 12, 2017
6	13	October 31, 2017	January 9, 2018

== Reception ==
Major Crimes received a score of 65/100 and "generally favorable" reviews based on 17 critics at Metacritic.

Newsday's Verne Gay gave the series a B+ grade, calling it "sharply written, acted and directed", adding "producers now have to turn an (occasional) antagonist into a full-time protagonist. Let the metamorphosis begin."

Robert Lloyd of the Los Angeles Times called the series a "nice balance between the tragic and comic", citing Mary McDonnell's performance as "modulated and cool, but with a blue-flame intensity".

Entertainment Weekly's Ken Tucker thought there were "fundamental distinctions" between The Closer's Brenda Leigh Johnson and Major Crimes' Sharon Raydor that "render the shows very different", adding "I've always found Raydor's serene assurance a palliative to the twitchy eccentricity of Kyra Sedgwick's Johnson."

Mike Hale of The New York Times thought the series "[made] the dullest character from the old show the central figure of the new one," adding "Major Crimes feels like a reasonably sharp black-and-white copy of The Closer, but fans of the franchise are likely to miss the color provided by Ms. Sedgwick’s vivid performance."

The first episode, helped by the final episode of The Closer airing beforehand, had 9.5 million viewers, the largest viewership for a series premiere on basic cable. Its first season ratings were the highest for any new show on cable.

== International broadcasts ==
- United Kingdom: Universal Channel
- Australia: Nine Network, 9Gem
- Bulgaria: Nova
- Denmark: Canal 9
- France: France 2
- Canada: Super Channel (English), Series+ (French)
- Slovenia: Pop TV
- Italy: Top Crime, Premium Crime
- Turkey: CNBC-e
- Poland: TVN 7
- Portugal: Fox Crime
- Netherlands: Net5
- Germany: WarnerTV Serie, VOX
- Croatia: Doma TV
- Finland: MTV3
- Russia: THT

== Broadcasts ==
In late 2016, Major Crimes entered broadcast syndication in the United States.

Network	Date
Start TV	August 31, 2020
Lifetime	January 4, 2021

Major Crimes became available to stream on Pluto TV and Netflix beginning in 2026.
