= James Duff (writer) =

American television director, producer and writer (born 1955)

- Born: September 3, 1955 (age 71); New Orleans, Louisiana, U.S.
- Education: Monterey High School, Coronado High School, Texas Tech University
- Occupations: Playwright, television series creator
- Spouse: Phillip P. Keene (m. 2013)
- Writing career
- Years active: 1992–present
- Notable works: Doing Time on Maple Drive, The Closer, Major Crimes, Sherlock & Daughter
- Notable awards: Primetime Emmy Award nomination (Doing Time on Maple Drive); Edgar Award nomination (The Closer episode "Blue Blood"); Women's Image Network Award (The Closer, 2006)

James Duff (born September 3, 1955) is an American television writer, producer and director. He has written plays and television screenplays and is credited as the creator of the TV series The Closer and Major Crimes.

== Early life and education ==
Duff was born in New Orleans and grew up in multiple cities in Texas with his adoptive parents. He attended Monterey High School, where he studied theatre arts with Harlan Reddell, and later graduated from Coronado High School. Duff also studied theatre at Texas Tech University.

== Career ==
In 1992, Duff wrote the made-for-television drama film Doing Time on Maple Drive, which premiered on Fox and received a nomination for the Primetime Emmy Award for Outstanding Television Movie. The following year, in 1993, he wrote the TV movie Without a Kiss Goodbye, a "fact-based drama about a mother who is falsely arrested and convicted of poisoning her infant." Duff also co‑wrote the short drama film A Song for You with Ken Martin, which starred Christopher Thornton and Mark Ruffalo.

In 1995, Duff wrote the television film Betrayed: A Story of Three Women, described as a "well‑structured drama" featuring performances by Meredith Baxter and Swoosie Kurtz. The same year, Duff also wrote 919 Fifth Avenue, and served as creator and co‑executive producer of Long Island Fever. In the next year, Duff’s 1984 play Homefront was adapted into the 1996 drama war film The War at Home, directed by, starring, and co‑produced by Emilio Estevez, and also featuring Kathy Bates and Martin Sheen. In addition, Duff was co‑executive producer of the CBS project Texas Graces.

In 1999, Duff worked as supervising writer on The WB series Popular, a position he held until 2001. In 2001, Duff wrote the episodes "My Best Friend's Wedding" for Felicity and "Fortunate Son" for Enterprise. The following year, in 2002, Duff collaborated on the CBS series The Agency, writing three episodes and serving as consulting producer. He also collaborated on the UPN series Wolf Lake, writing two episodes and acting as co‑executive producer the same year.

Two years later, Duff created the American legal drama television series The D.A., which aired on ABC from March 19 until April 9, 2004. He wrote all four episodes, including "The People vs. Sergius Kovinsky," "The People vs. Patricia Henry," "The People vs. Oliver C. Handley," and "The People vs. Ahmed Abbas."

Between 2005 and 2012, Duff co‑created and was showrunner of The Closer, produced by the Shephard/Robin Company with Warner Bros. Television and aired on TNT. Starring Kyra Sedgwick as Brenda Leigh Johnson, the series ran for seven seasons. Duff wrote twenty episodes and directed four, and the show concluded in 2012 with the launch of its spin‑off Major Crimes.

Following The Closer, Duff created the American police procedural television series Major Crimes, produced for TNT. Starring Mary McDonnell as Sharon Raydor, the series ran from 2012 to 2018. Across six seasons he wrote seven episodes and directed two, concluding after 105 episodes.

Between 2018 and 2020, Duff was credited as executive producer on Star Trek: Discovery and co‑wrote the episode "Die Trying" with Sean Cochran, which aired on November 12, 2020. He also served as executive producer on Star Trek: Picard, writing the episodes "Remembrance" and "The End is the Beginning".

Most recently, Duff served as showrunner on Sherlock & Daughter, a series by Brendan Foley based on the Sherlock Holmes stories. The show aired on The CW and Discovery+. He also wrote the episode "Sound Connections," directed by Bryn Higgins.

== Personal life ==
Duff is married to actor Phillip P. Keene, who plays Buzz Watson on The Closer and Major Crimes.

== Filmography ==
Year	Title	Credited as				
Year	Title	Writer	Producer	Director	Notes	Ref
1992	Doing Time on Maple Drive	Yes	No	No	TV movie	
1993	Without a Kiss Goodbye	Yes	No	No	TV movie	
1993	A Song for You	Yes	No	No	Short film	
1995	Betrayed: A Story of Three Women	Yes	No	No	TV movie	
1995	919 Fifth Avenue	Yes	No	No	TV movie	
1995	Long Island Fever	Yes	Yes	No	TV movie, co-executive producer	
1996	The War at Home	Yes	Yes	No	Feature film, adapted from Duff's play Homefront	
1996	Texas Graces	No	Yes	No	TV movie, co-executive producer	
1999–2001	Popular	Yes	No	No	Supervising writer	
2001	Felicity	Yes	No	No	Episode: "My Best Friend's Wedding"	
2001	Enterprise	Yes	No	No	Episode: "Fortunate Son"	
2002	The Agency	Yes	Yes	No	Wrote 3 episodes, consulting producer	
2002	Wolf Lake	Yes	Yes	No	Wrote 2 episodes, co-executive producer	
2004	The D.A.	Yes	Yes	No	Creator, executive producer	
2005–2012	The Closer	Yes	Yes	Yes	Co-creator and showrunner, wrote 20 episodes, directed 4 episodes	
2012–2018	Major Crimes	Yes	Yes	Yes	Creator and showrunner, wrote 7 episodes, directed 2 episodes	
2018–2020	Star Trek: Discovery	Yes	No	No	Episode: "Die Trying", executive producer	
2020	Star Trek: Picard	Yes	Yes	No	Executive producer, wrote "Remembrance" and "The End is the Beginning"	
2025	Sherlock & Daughter	No	Yes	No	Showrunner	

== Awards and nominations ==
Duff was nominated for an Emmy Award for his screenplay for the television movie Doing Time on Maple Drive. He and Mike Berchem scored an Edgar Award nomination in 2007 for their The Closer episode "Blue Blood".

In 2006, he shared the Women's Image Network Award for Outstanding Drama Series for The Closer with Greer Shephard and Michael M. Robin.

== Bibliography ==
- Duff, James (2023). Who Dies There?. Amazon Digital Services LLC – KDP. ISBN 9781962896016.
