= Lawrence Monoson =

American actor

- Born: August 11, 1964 (age 62); Yonkers, New York
- Years active: 1982–2013

Lawrence Monoson is an American film and television actor.

== Career ==
Monoson's first film was the 1982 comedy The Last American Virgin, in which he starred as Gary," a "girl-hungry" teen despite himself being gay. Other well-known film roles include the 1984 horror movie Friday the 13th: The Final Chapter as Ted Cooper, and the 1985 drama Mask as Ben.

Monoson starred in the short-lived (only two episodes were aired) 1997 TV series Prince Street. He had a recurring role on the series Resurrection Blvd. as Joey 'The Rock' Manelli, appearing in seven episodes during its first two seasons (2000 and 2001). Monoson also made guest appearances on episodes of a number of TV series, including Diff'rent Strokes, Beverly Hills, 90210, ER, NCIS, CSI: Crime Scene Investigation, 24, the Star Trek: Deep Space Nine 1993 episode "The Storyteller" and the Star Trek: Enterprise 2001 episode "Fortunate Son".

Monoson's last film role was in 2005's Guns Before Butter, while his last television role was in the 2010 episode "The 34th Floor" on the series CSI: NY.

== Filmography ==
Year	Title	Role	Notes
1982	The Last American Virgin	Gary	
1983	Diff'rent Strokes	Jerry	Episode: "A Growing Problem"
1984	Friday the 13th: The Final Chapter	Ted	
1985	Mask	Ben	
1987	Gaby: A True Story	Fernando	
1988	Dangerous Love	Gabe	
1991	My Life and Times	Joe Morton	Episode: "April 9, 2035"
1991	Payoff	Victor Concion	TV movie
1992	Final Judgement	Doorman at Art Gallery	
1993	Lies and Lullabies	Christopher Bentlage	TV movie
1993	Star Trek: Deep Space Nine	Hovath	Episode: "The Storyteller"
1993	And the Band Played On	Chip	TV movie
1994	Beverly Hills, 90210	Jon Farrino	3 episodes
1995	A Woman of Independent Means	Walter Burton	TV miniseries
1995	JAG	Detective Axelrad	Episode: "Déjà Vu"
1996	A Promise to Carolyn	Randy Goodson	TV movie
1996	Murder, She Wrote	Craig Haber	Episode: "Evidence of Malice"
1996	Black Rose of Harlem	Joey	
1996	Touched by an Angel	Tony Du Bois	Episode: "The Violin Lesson"
1997	Prince Street	Det. Jimmy Tasio	6 episodes
1997	Orleans	Bernard Palissy	Episode: "Luther's Temptation"
1997	Chicago Hope	Jerry Ashworth	Episode: "Cabin Fever"
1998	I Know What You Did	Philly	TV movie
1998	The Practice	PDA John Seymour	2 episodes
1998	To Have & to Hold	Johnny Morrison	Episode: "Right My Fire"
1999	Profiler	Anthony Fleming	Episode: "All in the Family"
1999	The Strip	Roman	Episode: "Murder by Numbers"
1999–2000	ER	Dean Rollins	4 episodes
2000	Sharing the Secret	Phil Paige	TV movie
2000	Seven Days	Jack Dawes	Episode: "The Cure"
2000–2001	Resurrection Blvd.	Joey "The Rock" Manelli	7 episodes
2001	Any Day Now	Virgil Smith	Episode: "One Hour of Drama"
2001	Star Trek: Enterprise	First Officer Matthew Ryan	Episode: "Fortunate Son"
2002	CSI: Crime Scene Investigation	Toby Arcane	Episode: "Abra Cadaver"
2003	Marines	Sgt. Larby	
2004	Starship Troopers 2: Hero of the Federation	Lt. Pavlov Dill	TV movie
2004	The Division		2 episodes
2004	CSI: Miami	Tommy Novac	Episode: "Legal"
2005	24	Gary	Episode: "Day 4: 1:00 p.m.-2:00 p.m."
2005	NCIS	Adam O'Neill	Episode: "Mind Games"
2005	Medium	James Massey	Episode: "The Reckoning"
2005	Guns Before Butter	Charlie	
2006	Without a Trace	Al Carter	Episode: "The Little Things"
2007	The Closer	Scott Hauser	Episode: "Saving Face"
2009	Dark Blue	Franzine's Guy	Episode: "Pilot"
2009	Cold Case	Ray Bianchi (1983)	Episode: "Chinatown"
2009	His Name Was Jason: 30 Years of Friday the 13th	Himself	Documentary film
2010	CSI: NY	Rudy Aronika	Episode: "The 34th Floor"
2013	Crystal Lake Memories: The Complete History of Friday the 13th	Himself	Documentary film
