= Ransford Doherty =

American actor

Ransford Doherty (born March 5) is an American actor, known for his supporting role as Kendall in The Closer (2008–2012) and its crossover series Major Crimes (2012–2017), as well as the films Something Like a Business alongside Kevin Hart, and Hostage with Bruce Willis.

== Early life ==
Doherty was born in Washington, D.C.. He attended C.D. Hylton High School and studied theatre performance at Longwood University, moving to Los Angeles to pursue acting shortly afterwards.

== Career ==
Doherty's first screen appearances began in 2000, when he appeared in episodes of JAG, ER, NYPD Blue, and had a guest run as Marco on MTV's Undressed. He would go on to have guest roles in numerous shows through the 2000s, including Malcolm in the Middle, Las Vegas, Bones, Girlfriends, and The Office. He played C.I. Kendall in The Closer, and Major Crimes a role he held from 2008 through 2017. Doherty recently appeared on Chicago Fire, Shameless and NCIS.

Doherty also utilizes his Masters degree in Special Education and 20+ years of experience as a Special Education Teacher for the Los Angeles Unified and Coppell Independent School District teaching students with special needs.

== Filmography ==
=== Film ===
Year	Title	Role	Notes
2001	What Matters Most	Maynard Hill	
2001	Shoo Fly	Dave	Short
2003	Destiny's Child	Actor	Short
2003	Silent Warnings	Maurice Hall	Video
2004	Among Thieves	Davante	Short
2005	Hostage	Mike Anders	
2008	The Orphan	Pvt. Jason Roderick	Short
2010	The Potential Inside	Xavier	
2010	Something Like a Business	Nick	
2010	Mary Anne Goes to the Market	Store Patron / Dancer	Short
2013	Girl at the Door	Detective Whelan	Short
Post-Production	Rain Not Sunshine	Ranger Gonzales	Short
Post-Production	Love and Baseball	Marcus	

=== Television ===
Year	Title	Role	Notes
2000	JAG	Private	1 Episode
2000	ER	Randall James	1 Episode
2000	The Huntress	The Kid	1 Episode
2000	Undressed	Marco	4 Episodes
2001	NYPD Blue	Academy Officer Raymond Greenwood	1 Episode
2002	The Hughleys	Ron	1 Episode
2002	Malcolm in the Middle	Orderly	1 Episode
2002	The District	Barry Rhone	1 Episode
2002	Philly	Officer Gordon Randall	1 Episode
2002	Power Rangers Wild Force	Guard	1 Episode
2004	Joan of Arcadia	DeShawn Wallace	2 Episodes
2004-2007	Las Vegas	Steve #2	2 Episodes
2007	Girlfriends	Keith	1 Episode
2008	Gemini Division	Aboyomi	
2008	Bones	Detective Paynter	1 Episode
2009	Three Rivers	Wallace	1 Episode
2009	The Office	Event Security	Episode: "Shareholder Meeting"
2009	Safety Geeks: SVI	Pierce Johnson	9 Episodes
2010	Jonas	Chuck	1 Episode
2011	Wizards of Waverly Place	Zeedrick	1 Episode
2011	Castle	Donald Mannis	1 Episode
2011-2012	Body of Proof	Detective Tim Bell	4 Episodes
2008-2012	The Closer	Kendall	20 Episodes
2013	Touch	Park Ranger	1 Episode
2011-2015	Caribe Road	James Crews	13 Episodes
2016	DBBZ Security Squad EPIC MINIz	Raymond H. Briggs	5 Episodes
2012-2017	Major Crimes	Kendall	59 Episodes
2019	Shameless	Quincy	1 Episode
2019	NCIS	Petty Officer Second Class Zachary Harper	1 Episode
2019	Sydney to the Max	Coach Willis	1 Episode
2024	Chicago Fire	Lieutenant LeClerc	1 Episode
