= Doing Time on Maple Drive =

1992 American drama film

- DVD cover
- Written by: James Duff
- Directed by: Ken Olin
- Starring: James Sikking; Bibi Besch; William McNamara; Jayne Brook; Jim Carrey; Lori Loughlin; David Byron
- Theme music composer: Laura Karpman
- Country of origin: United States
- Original language: English

Production
- Producers: Wayne Hanks; Paul Lussier; Gina Scheerer
- Cinematography: Bing Sokolsky
- Editor: Elba Sanchez-Short
- Running time: 92 minutes
- Production company: FNM Films

Original release
- Network: Fox
- Release: March 16, 1992

Doing Time on Maple Drive is a 1992 American made-for-television drama film written by James Duff and directed by Ken Olin. The movie stars James Sikking, Bibi Besch, William McNamara, Jayne Brook, David Byron, Lori Loughlin and Jim Carrey. It premiered on March 16, 1992, on Fox, and was nominated for a Primetime Emmy Award for Outstanding Television Movie. The tagline promoting the film was "They are living a lie called the Perfect American Family". It was shot entirely in Los Angeles.

== Plot ==
Phil Carter is a successful restaurateur, who has been married for many years to his wife, Lisa. They have three grown offspring: Karen, Tim, and Matt. Karen is married to Tom, an art photographer. Tim works in Phil's restaurant. Matt is a recently engaged college student. Despite outward appearances, the family is quite dysfunctional. Tim is an alcoholic who failed out of college. He catches Phil bribing local officials to overlook problems with the restaurant and tells his father that he resents him for acting like his drinking makes him a criminal when Phil is committing his own misdeeds. Tom thinks his in-laws dislike him because they believe that he destroyed Karen's literary career. Phil tells Tom that he and Karen are not financially stable enough to have children yet. Lisa is in deep denial about her family's problems.

Matt brings his fiancée Allison home from college one weekend to meet his family. While there, she witnesses some of their issues. She also discovers that Matt is gay after finding a letter in his jacket from his ex-boyfriend, Kyle. Early the next morning, she gives Matt the letter, breaks the engagement, and leaves after saying that she won't reveal his secret. Matt invents an excuse to explain her departure and doesn't say anything about the wedding. He carries on as if still engaged and attends his bachelor party, where Tim gets drunk and makes a fool of himself. While driving home, Matt decides to commit suicide by driving into a utility pole. He survives and wakes up in the hospital with a broken arm and some scratches. Karen is in the room watching over him and tells him that they haven't been able to reach Allison. He informs Karen that the marriage is off but doesn't state why. They joke about how upsetting the news will be to their parents and she promises not to tell them.

Matt is released from the hospital. Police declare the car crash to be an accident. Karen chastises Tim when he voices his suspicion that Matt deliberately caused his injuries. One day, Phil comes home with his children to find Lisa sitting on the couch and crying due to reading a note from Allison in which she apologizes for ending the engagement. Lisa demands an explanation. Matt initially tries to dodge the question. When Lisa presses the matter, Matt yells at her that she already knows it is because of his sexuality as she walked in on him and Kyle two years earlier and that he deliberately drove into the utility pole because he didn't want to live like this any longer. She tells him to call Allison to reconcile and he shouts at her again before storming off.

Tom angrily confronts Phil and declares that while Phil may be willing to destroy his own family, he won't allow Phil to wreck his. Phil is confused as to what Tom means. Tom then reveals that Karen is pregnant and is so terrified of bringing a child into a family situation like hers that she is considering having an abortion without telling him. Tom implores Karen not to have the abortion and they move away to protect their baby from her family's problems. While Lisa continues to struggle with denial, Phil begins to take tentative steps toward understanding and building bridges with his family.

== Cast ==
- James Sikking as Phil Carter
- Bibi Besch as Lisa Carter
- William McNamara as Matt Carter
- Jayne Brook as Karen Carter
- Lori Loughlin as Allison
- Jim Carrey as Tim Carter
- Janice Lynde as Judy
- Bodhi Elfman as Joe
- David Byron as Tom
- Philip Linton as Andy
- Bennett Cale as Kyle
- Richard Israel as Student Actor
- Mark Chaet as Nick
- George Roth as Dr. Norman
- Parker Whitman as Gene
- Danielle Michonne as Cindy
- Toni Sawyer as Millie
- Mike Marikian as Kevin
- Courtenay McWhinney as Clara

== Production notes ==
In an interview with Gay Star News, writer James Duff said the network didn't want Jim Carrey cast because he wasn't the "right guy", because of being a comedian. But after seeing his audition, Duff stated "he was amazing...his claim to fame is his comedy genius. I’m not sure people know that he’s got these sort of dramatic chops. He did an amazing job." Duff says of William McNamara, "I wanted somebody who was both extraordinary and ordinary at the same time, who could play ordinary and extraordinary and look extraordinary and ordinary, and he was a very hot commodity at the time."

Duff, who is openly gay, said the movie was "a very personal story and I was trying very hard to make it a universal story, not just about the nature of coming out. It is about denial in our culture and how denial keeps us from dealing with human truths – with our humanity. Everyone on Maple Drive is dealing with denial in some way." He also noted that movies with gay characters at that time were, "few and far between on television and mostly had to do with tragedy that we skirted in Maple Drive. We ended up someplace very good."

== Critical reception ==
Entertainment Weekly said the movie "does its best to draw you in with simple realism, which allows for complication, ambivalence, and other good things...but some of Maple Drive is a bit too psychologically pat, and its tender ending rings false." They graded the movie A−. The Deseret News review said "The acting is superb. Carrey and Laughlin are revelations, breaking out of the comedy molds they fill in weekly series....and much of the credit for the success of "Maple Drive" goes to director Ken Olin...who opts for several intriguing camera angles and unusual set-ups, which are used to good effect."

The Hartford Courant said the film "ends on a less than tidy note with problems left unsolved and important relationships hanging in the balance -- just like real life. Or just like the beginning of a new series. Either way. It works." Tampa Bay Times praised the movie as being "visually exciting", the dialogue realistic and "the acting natural".

Historian Stephen Tropiano wrote in his book that for the first 85 minutes of the movie Phil is an "oppressive monster, so it's difficult to accept his transformation into a somewhat rational, calming force in the last ten minutes." Additionally, he said that although the film ends "on a quiet, hopeful note, after 95 minutes of sturm and drang, it's all tied up a little too neatly and far too quickly."

== Awards and nominations ==
- Primetime Emmy Award for Outstanding Writing for a Limited Series, Movie, or Dramatic Special (James Duff nominated)
- Primetime Emmy Award for Outstanding Television Movie (nominated)
- Primetime Emmy Award for Outstanding Supporting Actress in a Limited Series or Movie (Bibi Besch nominated)
- Online Film & Television Association 2013 OFTA TV Hall of Fame (winner)

== Home media ==
Doing Time on Maple Drive was released on Region 1 DVD on September 7, 2004.
