= Sherlock & Daughter =

2025 American mystery TV series

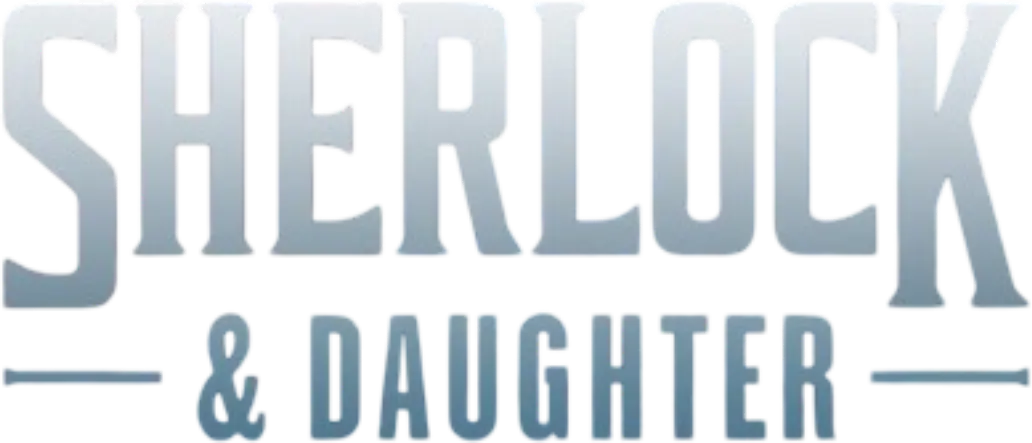
- Genre: Mystery; Period drama
- Created by: Brendan Foley
- Based on: Sherlock Holmes by Sir Arthur Conan Doyle
- Showrunner: James Duff
- Directed by: Bryn Higgins; Elle-Máijá Tailfeathers
- Starring: David Thewlis; Blu Hunt; Ardal O'Hanlon; Fiona Glascott; Aidan McArdle; Kojo Kamara; Joe Klocek; Dougray Scott; Owen Roe; Seán Duggan
- Country of origin: United States
- Original language: English
- No. of seasons: 1
- No. of episodes: 8

Production
- Executive producers: Blair Krempel; Mark Wood; Michael Emerson; Mike Sears; Charlotte Reid; Steven Fullagar; Peter Gerwe; Ivan Dunleavy; Michael Grade; Dominic Barlow; Chris Philip; Patricia Brown; Jean-François Doray; Karine Martin; Brendan Foley; James Duff
- Cinematography: Cathal Watters
- Running time: 42 minutes
- Production companies: Albion Television; Walking Entropy; Krempelwood; MBM3 Films; Starlings Television; StoryFirst

Original release
- Network: The CW
- Release: April 16, 2025 – present

Sherlock & Daughter is an American mystery television series created by Brendan Foley, with showrunner James Duff, based on the Sherlock Holmes stories by Sir Arthur Conan Doyle. The series premiered on April 16, 2025, on The CW and Discovery+. In January 2026, a second season was reported to be in development.

== Premise ==
In 1896, Sherlock Holmes becomes embroiled in a malevolent conspiracy involving the Red Thread criminal syndicate, who have kidnapped his closest friends. He joins forces with Amelia Rojas, a young Native American woman whose mother was recently murdered. As they work together to crack the case, Amelia also sets out to learn if the great detective is her long-lost father.

== Cast and characters ==
=== Main ===
- David Thewlis as Sherlock Holmes, a renowned private detective living at 221B Baker Street who seeks to uncover the mysterious criminal syndicate known as the Red Thread
- Blu Hunt as Amelia Rojas, a young American from California who arrives in London following her mother's murder to find Sherlock Holmes, her suspected father
- Ardal O'Hanlon as Mr. Halligan, Sherlock's butler and coachman
- Fiona Glascott as Lady Violet Somerset, a socialite who trains young women in proper etiquette in British high society
- Aidan McArdle as Chief Inspector Whitlock, the head of Scotland Yard who is well acquainted with Sherlock
- Kojo Kamara (Note: Appears in only three episodes, but is credited amongst the main cast.) as Clarence Halfpenny, the owner of a carriage workshop
- Joe Klocek as Daniel "Dan" Moriarty, alias Michael Wylie, Professor Moriarty's estranged son and a juvenile offender who grew up in Australia
- Dougray Scott as Professor James Moriarty, Sherlock's arch-enemy who is incarcerated at Newgate Prison
- Owen Roe (Note: Appears in only two episodes, but is credited amongst the main cast.) as Lord Salisbury, the Prime Minister of the United Kingdom
- Seán Duggan as Dr. John Watson, Sherlock's closest friend and a skilled physician

=== Recurring ===
- Mary O'Driscoll as Mrs. Halligan, Sherlock's temporary housekeeper
  - O'Driscoll also portrays Mrs. Hudson, Mrs. Halligan's twin sister and Sherlock's landlady
- Paul Reid as Inspector Bullivant, a senior police officer in charge of the investigation at the American ambassador's residence
- Gia Hunter as Clara Anderson, the American ambassador's daughter, who befriends Amelia on the boat ride to England
- Phillip P. Keene as Paul Anderson, Clara's father and the newly-appointed American ambassador to the United Kingdom
- Ivana Miličević as Marjorie Anderson, Clara's mother and Paul's wife
- Aisling Kearns as Cassie, the Anderson family's maid
- Savonna Spracklin as Lucia Rojas, Amelia's deceased mother and a proficient engineer who appears during flashbacks. Born Little Dove, her ethnicity is revealed in "For Kith and Kin" as "the daughter of a rancher and an Apache, with a Spanish grandfather".
- Orén Kinlan as Shaw McPherson, the leader of the Baker Street Irregulars, a gang of street children whom Sherlock hires to find information
- Shashi Rami as Bertram "Bertie" Birtwistle, an insurance investigator searching for the American ambassador's missing jewels
- Antonio Aakeel as Detective Swann, part of the Scotland Yard scientific division, who is fascinated with the newest technological innovations

=== Guest ===
- Hyoie O'Grady as Charles "Charlie" Holroyd, the Anderson family's coachman
- Andy Kellegher as Weams, a criminal affiliated with the Red Thread
- Michael Ellen Sean as Magott, Weams's partner, who is affiliated with the Red Thread
- Caolan Byrne as Dankworth, a prison officer at Newgate Prison loyal to Moriarty
- Jack Meade as Lord Withersea, a nobleman working for the Red Thread
- Seamus O'Hara as O'Leary, Withersea's Irish coachman
- Ruairí Heading as Pete Pound, a technician who installs a telephone at 221B Baker Street
- Rose O'Neill as Emma, a debutante under Lady Violet's tutulege
- Maximilian Henhappel as Herr Bernt, an associate of Dan Moriarty
- John Doran as Jeremy Stephens, Lord Salisbury's private secretary

== Episodes ==
No.	Title	Directed by	Written by	Original release date
1	"The Challenge"	Bryn Higgins	Brendan Foley	April 16, 2025
In London in 1896, Sherlock has received a letter requiring that he "observe the thread" or Dr. Watson and Mrs. Hudson will be killed, as his maid was. Meanwhile in New York, Amelia Rojas trades her mother's gold pocket watch for a steamship ticket to England. While on board, she meets Clara, the daughter of the newly appointed American ambassador to the Court of St James's. In London, Amelia makes her way to 221b Baker Street, where she is mistaken as the new scullery maid. She explains that her mother told her to go to Sherlock if she ever needed help. Sherlock orders Amelia dismissed but is interrupted by the arrival of the American ambassador and his wife who report that Clara has been kidnapped. The ambassador's wife assumes Amelia is working for Sherlock and asks that Amelia help in his investigation. When Sherlock sees a red thread in Clara's bedroom, he immediately leaves. Amelia stays and learns that Charlie, the ambassador's American coachman, has disappeared with the ambassador's coach and horses. After Amelia reports this to Sherlock, she explains that her mother, Lucia Rojas, had been killed recently in California. Her mother instructed Amelia to take a particular photo with her and seek out her father, Sherlock Holmes. Sherlock has no knowledge of Lucia and does not believe Amelia is his daughter. He cannot visibly involve himself in Clara's disappearance but Amelia can investigate on his behalf. To avoid suspicion, Amelia will stay on as his maid.
2	"The Common Thread"	Bryn Higgins	Brendan Foley	April 23, 2025
Amelia returns to the ambassador's residence. Cassie the cook tells her that the ambassador's wife's very valuable jewels are also missing. Sherlock finds the ambassador's coach, and a strange screw. Sherlock explains to Amelia that he has been forced to withdraw from investigations to protect Dr. Watson and Mrs. Hudson. Amelia tracks the screw to the Withersea coffin factory where she sees Charlie. Sherlock searches Amelia's room and finds a red thread, the symbol of the criminal organization which threatens him. At the coffin factory, the hostage-takers are tipped off. They leave with Dr. Watson and Mrs. Hudson in two coffins; Charlie leaves in a carriage with Clara in a coffin. Amelia chases Charlie and rescues Clara, as Charlie is arrested. Amelia and Clara rendezvous with a disguised Sherlock who explains to Amelia that Charlie and Clara planned the kidnapping to elope, taking the jewels to sell to support themselves. However, Charlie became involved with a criminal syndicate and now both he and Clara are in danger.
3	"Partners in Crime"	Bryn Higgins	Teleplay by : Shelly Goldstein & Brendan Foley	May 7, 2025
Sherlock asks Amelia to explain the red thread he found in her room, the symbol of the criminal organization which has kidnapped his friends and the signal that he must not investigate. Amelia explains that the thread was tied to the handle of the knife used to stab her mother and that several of her mother's designs have been stolen. Amelia again shows Sherlock the photo which her mother had given her, a photo from when her mother had worked on the Wild West Show. Sherlock and Amelia agree to work on the case of the Red Thread together and not to stop before they have brought her mother's killer to justice. Sherlock goes to Newgate Prison ostensibly to visit his arch-enemy, Professor Moriarty. Many of Moriarty's criminal activities and lieutenants have been absorbed by the Red Thread, making them his enemies too. Sherlock speaks with Charlie, who is being held in Newgate. Sherlock gets Charlie to reveal the names of the hostage-takers and their location. Moriarty demands that Sherlock bring Moriarty's estranged son, Dan, to visit him. Dan had been transported to Australia, but has recently returned to England. On his way out of the Prison, Sherlock sees that Charlie has been killed by the Red Thread.
4	"For Kith and Kin"	Bryn Higgins	Teleplay by : Shelly Goldstein & Brendan Foley	May 14, 2025
Amelia is accosted by a young Australian, Michael Wylie, who asks her to report to him on Sherlock's relationship with Professor Moriarty. Sherlock is given a statement of telephone calls by Chief Inspector Whitlock at Scotland Yard so that Sherlock can estimate the monthly cost of using this new device. Whitlock also tells Sherlock that Dan Moriarty has changed his name to Michael Wylie and now works at the Stock Exchange. Amelia infiltrates the estate of Lord Withersea. She discovers the hostage-takers' bodies. When confronted by Sherlock, Lord Withersea informs him that the Red Thread represent "the industrialization of crime" and are about to commit "the greatest offense ever conceived", even beyond Sherlock's imagination. Rather than betray the Red Thread and endanger his family, Withersea commits suicide. Sherlock takes a telephone statement from Withersea's desk. Lady Violet visits Sherlock. She sees the photograph of the Wild West Show and points out herself and Sherlock in the background as well as Little Dove, an engineer with whom Sherlock was in love. Lady Violet confirms that Little Dove changed her name to Lucia Rojas and is Amelia's mother.
5	"Doubting Thomas"	Elle-Máijá Tailfeathers	Micah War Dog	May 21, 2025
Detective Swann of the Scotland Yard Scientific Division brings someone to install a telephone for Sherlock. Amelia meets Dan, who has brought her flowers, to berate him for lying about who he is. The Irregulars bring Sherlock to Dan while Amelia is meeting him. Sherlock warns Dan against seeing Amelia. Amelia, who has been asked to become Clara's personal chaperone, accompanies Clara to Lady Violet's house where lessons in deportment are being given. One of the girls, Emma, slips and falls from a ladder, and dies. Sherlock and Bertie Birtwistle, an insurance investigator who is examining the insurance claim of £50,000 for the missing jewels, agree to share information. Sherlock and Swann compare the telephone statements from Whitlock and Withersea to see which numbers were called from both telephones to identify the conspirators. Amelia sees knives identical to the one which killed her mother in Lady Violet's house. Birtwistle confirms to Sherlock that the murdered Lucia Rojas, also known as Little Dove, had a daughter named Amelia who was born six months after her mother left London. Amelia accompanies Clara to a ball, which is also attended by Dan and Sherlock. The kidnapping of Amelia by two coachmen is stopped by Sherlock and Dan, who kills one of the coachmen.
6	"Sound Connections"	Bryn Higgins	James Duff	May 28, 2025
Sherlock arranges that Dan is held in Newgate pending questioning about the killing of the South African coachman. Amelia realizes that Lady Violet killed Emma so that Clara's debutante ball could be scheduled in place of Emma's. Sherlock tells Amelia that he had met Little Dove after the Royal Command Performance of the Wild West Show. He saw her designs for mechanical weapons, as did Lady Violet, whose father was then Secretary of War. Knowledge of the weapon designs gives Lady Violet a motive for murdering Amelia's mother. Dan and Professor Moriarty argue vehemently about the Professor's criminal activities. Dan professes idealism for a better world. When examining the coach used to kidnap Amelia, Sherlock discovers it has a false floor. In exchange for protecting Dan, Sherlock is "kidnapped" by Moriarty's men so that he can be delivered to and meet the Prime Minister without the Red Thread knowing. He asks the Prime Minister for a warrant for a wiretap.
7	"The Golden Fleece"	Bryn Higgins	Shelly Goldstein	June 4, 2025
Whitlock takes the bait and telephones to arrange the move of Dr. Watson and Mrs. Hudson. Sherlock and his associates intercept and free the hostages. Detective Swann records the calls made to and from Whitlock's telephone. Amelia overhears that Lady Violet has blueprints of a powerful weapon, stolen from Amelia's mother when she was murdered. Holmes correctly deduces that a large amount of gold recently transferred to the Bank of England have been stolen. When the newspapers report this, there is a market crash and shares in the Bank drop dramatically in value, threatening to collapse the British financial system. Sherlock and Amelia deduce that the stolen gold is being hidden in coffins at Lord Withersea's factory. Meanwhile, the American Ambassador and a consortium of investors bought shares in the Bank at a bargain price, making him both a national hero and immensely rich following the return of the gold. Holmes must still unravel "a crime beyond his imagination". Dan Moriarity informs his father that he is the Red Thread and has taken over large portions of his father's criminal syndicate. Dan intends to start a war against the British Empire and liberate its colonies, following an "inciting incident".
8	"The Last Dance"	Bryn Higgins	James Duff	June 11, 2025
Sherlock and Swann confront Whitlock with the recording of his telephone calls as he attempts to flee the country with the ambassador's jewels. Whitlock, too, claims to be the Red Thread. They subdue him and recover the jewels. Amelia finds Dan Moriarity at Clara's ball at the American Embassy. Dan claims he did not know that Lady Violet had sent someone to kill Amelia's mother. When he arrives at the ball, Sherlock urges Bullivant to take the Prime Minister, whom Sherlock claims is the target of assassins, back to Downing Street. Amelia confronts Lady Violet in the Embassy stables. Lady Violet attacks Amelia and takes her gun. Sherlock orders Lady Violet to not harm his daughter. Lady Violet also claims to be the Red Thread. When Lady Violet shoots at Sherlock, the gun backfires, startling horses who drag her to her death. While the Prime Minister is giving a toast to Clara, an Austro-Hungarian revolutionary shoots at him but misses. Sherlock kills the assassin. Amelia confronts Dan in a secret passage at the Embassy. She accuses him of complicity in her mother's murder then locks him in the passage, where she expects him to eventually suffocate. Later, Dr. Watson writes a secret account of "The Adventure of the Red Thread", to be hidden away and not published so long as Amelia is safe. She can continue as part of Sherlock's household as a silent partner but never to be disclosed as his daughter.

== Production ==
The series was announced in February 2024, along with the casting of Thewlis, Hunt and Scott. The series was created by Brendan Foley, who acts as executive producer alongside showrunner James Duff. Micah Wright, Shelly Goldstein, and Foley provided the scripts. Filming took place in Dublin in April 2024, with North Great George's Street being used for exterior shooting. Filming also occurred in County Wicklow. Production wrapped in June. The series consists of eight episodes, all directed by Bryn Higgins.

In January 2026, a second season was reported to be in development.

== Release ==
Promotional poster

The series premiered on April 16, 2025 on The CW in the US and Discovery+ in the UK and Ireland. The series was also released on the Max (later renamed "HBO Max") streaming service in June 2025. Internationally, the series was broadcast by Yle and Amedia in Finland, NRK in Norway, DR in Denmark, SVT in Sweden, Amediateka in Russia, RÚV in Iceland, and SBS in Australia. Federation International in July 2025 helped negotiate the sale of the show to Sky Italia in Italy, Bell Media in Canada, RTS in Switzerland, Nova in Greece, Disney Entertainment in the Balkans, Tivibu in Turkey and TV3 Group in the Baltics. It premiered in the Netherlands on BBC NL on July 20, 2026.

The series was released on HBO Max in the UK and Ireland on November 5, 2026. It was acquired by RTP for broadcast in Portugal, CT for Czech Republic, AB1 for France, Viasat for Poland, and MagentaTV for Germany in November 2026. Streamz acquired the series for streaming in Belgium, Canal+ for Austria and Switzerland, and yes for Israel.

== Reception ==
=== Critical reception ===
The series opened to generally positive reviews. On Rotten Tomatoes, it has an approval rating of 75%. MediaPost stated: "The great David Thewlis mesmerizes in the role of Sherlock Holmes. [...] This show is a high-quality, well-made adventure and mystery series – two words that add up to one word: Entertainment." The Hollywood Reporter wrote that "Thewlis is a perfect fit" in an otherwise "modestly amusing" series with possible future potential. It singled out Dougray Scott for his "theatrical physicality" as Professor Moriarty. The A.V. Club thought the show "successfully intertwined mystery with melodrama", while TV Guide also praised Thewlis as "perfectly cast" alongside Blu Hunt as Sherlock's possible daughter, and highlighted supporting performances by Dougray Scott and Fiona Glascott. RogerEbert.com praised Hunt's performance, but criticised the writing of the show.

=== Ratings ===
The first season of Sherlock & Daughter became the most-watched season on The CW broadcast network in the US, the second-most watched on The CW streaming app and the fourth-most watched on the Max streaming service following its release. The following are the viewership ratings for the first season's broadcast on The CW in the US. The series premiered on HBO Max in the UK and Ireland on November 5, 2026 and became the most-watched series on the streamer, a position it held for two weeks.

Viewership and ratings per episode of Sherlock & Daughter
No.	Title	Air date	Rating (18–49)	Viewers (millions)	DVR (18–49)	DVR viewers (millions)	Total (18–49)	Total viewers (millions)
1	"The Challenge"	April 16, 2025	0.0	0.49	0.0	0.36	0.0	0.85
2	"The Common Thread"	April 23, 2025	0.0	0.48	0.0	0.38	0.0	0.86
3	"Partners in Crime"	May 7, 2025	0.1	0.44	0.0	0.35	0.1	0.80
4	"For Kith and Kin"	May 14, 2025	0.0	0.44	0.0	0.40	0.1	0.84
5	"Doubting Thomas"	May 21, 2025	0.0	0.46	0.0	0.42	0.1	0.88
6	"Sound Connections"	May 28, 2025	0.0	0.53	0.0	0.46	0.1	1.00
7	"The Golden Fleece"	June 4, 2025	0.0	0.56	0.0	0.41	0.1	0.97
8	"The Last Dance"	June 11, 2025	0.0	0.51	0.0	0.44	0.0	0.95
