= Prince Street (TV series) =

American television series

- Created by: Robert Nathan; Michael Harbert
- Starring: Joe Morton; Vincent Spano; Mariska Hargitay
- Composer: Jan Hammer
- Country of origin: United States
- Original language: English
- No. of seasons: 1
- No. of episodes: 6 (4 unaired)

Production
- Executive producer: Robert Nathan
- Producer: Eric Overmyer
- Running time: 60 minutes
- Production companies: Writer's Workbench Films; Warner Bros. Television

Original release
- Network: NBC
- Release: March 6 – March 12, 1997

Prince Street is an American police drama television series that aired only two episodes in March 1997 on NBC before being cancelled.

The show premiered on a Thursday night, March 6, at 10pm ET (the time slot usually held at that time by ER) and was going to air on Wednesday nights at 10pm ET in place of the NBC drama Law & Order for a few weeks in March and April.

However, after the ratings for the show's second episode showed a very low audience, it was quickly cancelled. Law & Order returned to its regular Wednesday-night time slot three weeks later.

== Premise ==
Based on the exploits of a real police unit in New York City formed in 1971 and operated secretly for twenty years, it was headquartered behind a print shop on Prince Street. These NYPD officers did not carry any badges, did not wear uniforms, and constantly worked in disguise in order to break up some of the roughest criminal organizations in the city.

== Cast ==
- Joe Morton as Lt. Tom Warner
- Vincent Spano as Det. Alex Gage
- Mariska Hargitay as Det. Nina Echeverria
- Lawrence Monoson as Det. Jimmy Tasio
- Steven Martini as Det. Tony Libretti
- Dana Eskelson as Det. Diane Hoffman

== Episodes ==
No.	Title	Directed by	Written by	Original release date
1	"Pilot"	Roger Spottiswoode	Robert Nathan & Michael Harbert	March 6, 1997
2	"God Bless America"	Unknown	Unknown	March 12, 1997
3	"Everyday People"	N/A	N/A	Unaired
4	"Drugs, Lies and Videotape"	N/A	N/A	Unaired
5	"Father and Sons"	N/A	N/A	Unaired
6	"A Room Without a View"	N/A	N/A	Unaired
