= Fortunate Son (Star Trek: Enterprise) =

- Star Trek: Enterprise episode
- Episode no.: Season 1 Episode 10
- Directed by: LeVar Burton
- Written by: James Duff
- Production code: 110
- Original air date: November 21, 2001

Guest appearances
- Lawrence Monoson - Commander Matthew Ryan; Kieran Mulroney - Shaw; Vaughn Armstrong - Admiral Forrest; Danny Goldring - Nausican Captain; Charles Lucia - Captain Keene; D. Elliot Woods - Nausican Prisoner; Daniel Asa Henson - Boy; Elyssa D. Vito - Girl

Episode chronology
← Previous "Civilization"	Next → "Cold Front"
- Star Trek: Enterprise season 1

"Fortunate Son" is the tenth episode (production #110) of the television series Star Trek: Enterprise, and was written by James Duff. LeVar Burton served as director for the episode. The episode aired on UPN on November 21, 2001.

Captain Archer is contacted by Admiral Forrest to assist ECS Fortunate, a Y-class freighter. Archer, Lieutenant Reed, Doctor Phlox, and Ensign Mayweather learn from the first officer that the Fortunate was attacked by Nausicaans and that the captain was injured. Enterprise helps repair the Fortunate until sensors show that the 23-member crew has an additional person aboard.

== Plot ==
An Earth freighter with a crew of twenty-three, ECS Fortunate, is attacked by Nausicaans and Enterprise is sent to help. When they arrive, the freighter is relatively unharmed apart from Captain Keene, who is lying unconscious in the ship's infirmary, but the rest of the crew are secretive and reluctant to provide explanations. While helping repair Fortunate, Sub-Commander T'Pol detects a Nausicaan bio-sign. It transpires that Commander Matthew Ryan and his men are secretly torturing the captive for his shield access codes. Ryan admits the Nausicaan pirate is their prisoner, but refuses to let the Starfleet personnel see him, and Captain Archer threatens to retract his assistance to Fortunate.

Ryan seemingly relents, but as Archer and his away team enter a cargo section of the freighter, the cargo pod is suddenly jettisoned with the away team inside. Before Fortunate warps away, it attempts to damage Enterprise in order to delay pursuit. Enterprise recovers its people and begins pursuit of the rogue freighter. Meanwhile, Fortunate arrives at the asteroid used by the Nausicaan pirates, but discover the acquired shield codes are useless. The pirates attempt to board the freighter and rescue their captured crewman just as Enterprise arrives and begins to engage the Nausicaan ships.

Archer is soon able to broker a temporary truce: if they can return the Nausicaan captive, the boarding party will stand down. Ryan is uncooperative until Ensign Mayweather intervenes, saying that Ryan's motivations are not about preventing future attacks on Earth ships; they are about personal revenge, and doing so simply exposes other freighter crews to revenge attacks as well. Ryan relents. Later, Archer and Captain Keene of Fortunate discuss Ryan's actions and his demotion to Crewman 3rd class. They agree Ryan acted rashly, but Keene also muses that acting on their own is the primary motivation his people are out here — to both challenge and prove themselves.

== Production ==
This episode explored the culture of "Space Boomers", the lives of people working and living in space long term on slow moving commercial freighters, rather than the more advanced Starfleet vessels such as Enterprise. The writers planned to further explore Boomers culture and had another story or two in mind, but Brannon Braga said they didn't want to keep meeting humans because "it made it feel like Enterprise was still a little too close to home." They also wanted to try and develop Mayweather and not have him only talking about Boomers all the time. The show would revisit Boomer culture in season 2 in the episode "Horizon". This episode was written by James Duff, who would later become an executive producer on season two of Star Trek: Discovery and season one of Star Trek: Picard. This was the second episode of Enterprise directed by LeVar Burton. Burton directed 28 episodes of Star Trek television in this period, including for Star Trek: The Next Generation, Star Trek: Deep Space Nine, Star Trek: Voyager and Star Trek: Enterprise.

Guest star Lawrence Monoson praised director LeVar Burton for his understanding and ability to communicate with the actors: "there was a scene I felt went particularly well, except for one point where I thought I was really awful and missed the beat. Afterwards Levar came up to me and before I said a word he knew which part I wasn't thrilled with. He's got a great eye. Levar makes you feel part of the creative process, and that means a great deal, especially if you're a guest star." Monoson spoke of his approach to the character of Matthew Ryan: "He's not Starfleet. He's a blue-collar worker, and I wanted to keep him as natural as possible. Conversely, like the Enterprise crew, he's an astronaut, a trained professional. It was a bit of a challenge trying to find the balance between being naturalistic and playing the style of that world, but it's one I enjoyed." Guest star Danny Goldring previously appeared on Deep Space Nine and Voyager, and also returns as a different character in season two episode "The Catwalk".

== Reception ==
Fortunate Son was first aired in the United States on UPN on November 21, 2001. According to Nielsen Media Research, it received a 3.8 rating share among adults. This means it had an average of 6.1 million viewers. The relatively low ratings were attributed to the episode being broadcast the night before Thanksgiving, the share of the audience watching at 7% remained comparable.

Michelle Erica Green of TrekNation said the episode was "a bit didactic and predictable" but interesting for revealing something that had not been addressed before, the relationship between civilian merchant ships and Starfleet, and the character development of Mayweather. Darren Mooney of the m0vie blog called it "a solid premise ruined by an overly simplistic execution." In 2014, Jordan Hoffman writing for Playboy ranked this episode 446 out of 695 Star Trek episodes, and called it a "Nice bit of world building". Keith DeCandido of Tor.com gave it six out of ten in his 2022 rewatch.

== Home media ==
This episode was released as part of Enterprise season one, which was released in high definition on Blu-ray disc on March 26, 2013; it has 1080p video and a DTS-HD Master Audio sound track.
