= The D.A. (2004 TV series) =

- Genre: Legal drama
- Created by: James Duff
- Country of origin: United States
- Original language: English
- No. of seasons: 1
- No. of episodes: 4

Production
- Running time: 60 minutes
- Production companies: The Shephard/Robin Company; Warner Bros. Television

Original release
- Network: ABC
- Release: March 19 – April 9, 2004

The D.A. is an American legal drama television series that aired from March 19 until April 9, 2004.

== Premise ==
David Franks is a politically ambitious district attorney in Los Angeles.

== Cast ==
- Steven Weber as DA David Franks
- Bruno Campos as Mark Camacho
- Michaela Conlin as Jinette McMahon
- Ron Clarkson as The D.A.
- J. K. Simmons as Joe Carter
- Sarah Paulson as Lisa Patterson
- Alan Angle as 'Bestie'
- Bobby Cook as 'Ex-Bestie'

== Episodes ==
| No. | Title | Directed by | Written by | Original release date | Prod. code |
|---|---|---|---|---|---|
| 1 | "The People vs. Sergius Kovinsky" | Michael M. Robin | James Duff | March 19, 2004 | 177701 |
The office of the D.A. is investigated after a Russian mob witness is killed.
| 2 | "The People vs. Patricia Henry" | Michael M. Robin | James Duff | March 26, 2004 | 177702 |
The wife of a murdered TV star claims to be a victim of spousal abuse.
| 3 | "The People vs. Oliver C. Handley" | Elodie Keene | James Duff | April 2, 2004 | 177703 |
A woman who committed suicide leaves an envelope addressed to David Franks.
| 4 | "The People vs. Ahmed Abbas" | Michael M. Robin | James Duff | April 9, 2004 | 177704 |
New evidence surfaces in a 10-year-old terrorism case.
