= The Closer =

American police drama TV series (2005–2012)

- Genre: Crime drama; Police procedural
- Created by: James Duff; Michael M. Robin; Greer Shephard
- Starring: Kyra Sedgwick; J. K. Simmons; Corey Reynolds; Robert Gossett; G. W. Bailey; Tony Denison; Jon Tenney; Michael Paul Chan; Raymond Cruz; Gina Ravera; Phillip P. Keene; Mary McDonnell
- Composer: James S. Levine
- Country of origin: United States
- Original language: English
- No. of seasons: 7
- No. of episodes: 109 (list of episodes)

Production
- Executive producers: James Duff; Michael M. Robin; Greer Shephard; Kyra Sedgwick; Rick Wallace
- Producers: Kyra Sedgwick; Andrew J. Sacks; Ronald Chang; Sheelin Choksey; Mike Berchem; Michael Alaimo; Duppy Demetrius; Leo Geter; Wendy West; Patrick McKee
- Running time: 42–60 minutes
- Production companies: The Shephard/Robin Company; Walking Entropy; Warner Bros. Television

Original release
- Network: TNT
- Release: June 13, 2005 – August 13, 2012

Related
- Major Crimes

The Closer is an American police procedural television series starring Kyra Sedgwick as Brenda Leigh Johnson, a Los Angeles Police Department deputy chief. A CIA-trained interrogator originally from Atlanta, Georgia, Brenda has a reputation as a closer—an interrogator who not only solves a case, but also obtains confessions that lead to convictions, thus "closing" the case. The series ran on TNT from June 13, 2005, to August 13, 2012.

The Closer was created by James Duff and the Shephard/Robin Company in association with Warner Bros. Television. On July 11, 2011, the series began its seventh and final season, having finished its sixth season as cable's highest-rated drama. The Closer's final six episodes began airing on July 9, 2012, with its finale airing on August 13, 2012. Following the finale, The Closer's spin-off, Major Crimes, premiered.

== Episodes ==
Primary cast in 2006

Each episode of The Closer deals with an aspect of the Los Angeles culture as it interfaces with law enforcement in the megacity. The show deals with complex and subtle issues of public policy, ethics, personal integrity, and questions of good and evil. The rather large character ensemble explores the human condition, touching on individual faiths, traditional religious influences in the lives and communities of contemporary society, and the breakdown and dysfunction of family systems, work teaming, police violence, and government responsibility. The first season began with Brenda Leigh Johnson arriving at the LAPD to lead the Priority Murder Squad (PMS), quickly renamed Priority Homicide Division (PHD), a team that originally dealt solely with high-profile murder cases (seasons one to four).

During season four, an embarrassing tangle with the press over just what criteria make a homicide a priority allowed Brenda to manipulate circumstances so that the division was upgraded to a much larger major crimes division with a wider scope, (Note: Previously known as Priority Murder Squad (season one, episodes one and two), then Priority Homicide Division (season one, episode three through season four, episode nine). The division's name was first changed from Priority Murder Squad when it was recognized that the initials were PMS, leading to unintended humor due to Chief Johnson's sex. The division's official name was changed to Major Crimes Division (MCD) during season four, episode nine in response to the storyline's media misinterpretation of the use of the word "Priority", and the team first operated as the MCD in the following episode. At the end of summer season four, episode nine ("Tijuana Brass"), the squad was given the task to handle a range of crimes, including fraud and kidnapping, and renamed the Major Crimes Division, whose brief was enlarged (in theory) to include to a wider range of major crimes including grand theft, fraud, rape, and homicide, along the lines of a major case squad. Nevertheless, storylines continued to focus on solving murders until late in the sixth season, when after the ascension of a new police chief, the underused squad was assigned a serial armed robbery gang—which in the event, quickly became a murder investigation the next day.) though most plots still focused on homicides. Most importantly to the show's plotlines, Commander Taylor's role was also changed from "rival and in-house adversary" to that of "unambiguously loyal subordinate", so he was thereafter reporting directly to Brenda and noticeably helpful as he coordinated interaction between the MCD and other units.

Season five introduced Mary McDonnell as Captain Sharon Raydor of the Force Investigations Division. Raydor and Brenda start out as rivals, but gradually develop grudging respect for each other and form an uneasy alliance. McDonnell went on to star in The Closer's spin-off, Major Crimes.

During the final season, Brenda finds herself in civil legal difficulties as a result of the events in "War Zone" (season six, episode eight), and the LAPD concludes that a disloyal subordinate must be generating information leaks from within MCD. Taylor and Raydor take an active role in attempting to combat the leaker, and the legal matters do not reach a final resolution until the series' end, in the episode "The Last Word".

On December 10, 2010, TNT announced that the seventh season of The Closer, which began production in the spring of 2011, would be the last. The channel said that the decision to retire the show was made by Sedgwick. On January 30, 2011, it was announced that the final season would add six episodes to the usual 15-episode order, building toward the spin-off series, Major Crimes.

== Characters ==
The cast consists largely of an ensemble of detectives who make up the LAPD's fictional Priority Homicide Division, which evolves into the Major Crimes Division. It is led by Deputy Chief Brenda Leigh Johnson, played by Kyra Sedgwick.

Some observers have noted strong similarities between Brenda and Jane Tennison, Helen Mirren's lead character in the British crime drama Prime Suspect, with an article in USA Today claiming The Closer to be "an unofficial Americanization" of the British drama. In interviews, Sedgwick has acknowledged that the show owes "a debt" to Prime Suspect and her admiration for that show and Mirren were factors that first interested her in the role.

Other main characters include Brenda's superior officer, Assistant Chief Will Pope (J. K. Simmons), Robbery-Homicide Division Commander Russell Taylor (Robert Gossett), and her FBI agent boyfriend-then-husband Fritz Howard (Jon Tenney). The remainder of the cast makes up Brenda's squad, each with expertise in a specific area, such as crime-scene investigation or gang activity. Gina Ravera was the only regular cast member to depart the series. She left the popular series after season four and before the start of season five. Her character, Detective Irene Daniels, was written as having been transferred to another division.

Mary McDonnell, a recurring cast member in seasons five and six, joined the cast full-time for season seven, continuing her role as Captain Sharon Raydor.

=== Main cast and characters ===
- Kyra Sedgwick as Brenda Leigh Johnson, Los Angeles Police Department (LAPD) deputy chief, Major Crimes Division. Originally a CIA-trained police detective from Atlanta, Georgia, she is the interrogation specialist Will Pope calls a "closer".
- J. K. Simmons as Will Pope, LAPD assistant chief for operations, acting chief of police during season six and interim chief of police during season seven. His office is sometimes sarcastically referred to as "The Vatican".
- Corey Reynolds as David Gabriel, LAPD sergeant, is a laterally appointed detective sergeant from season five onward.
- Robert Gossett as Russell Taylor, LAPD captain, is initially assigned to Robbery-Homicide Division, promoted to commander in season two, and appointed LAPD interdepartmental liaison in season four.
- G. W. Bailey as Louie Provenza, LAPD detective lieutenant, is second-in-command of MCD.
- Tony Denison as Andy Flynn, LAPD detective lieutenant, is transferred from Robbery-Homicide to MCD during season one.
- Jon Tenney as Fritz Howard, Senior Special Agent of the Federal Bureau of Investigation, is the FBI-LAPD liaison from season six onwards.
- Michael Paul Chan as Michael Tao, LAPD detective lieutenant, is the scientific investigation specialist (regular: seasons 3–7; recurring: seasons 1–2)
- Raymond Cruz as Julio Sanchez, LAPD detective, is the guns and gangs specialist (regular: seasons 3–7; recurring: seasons 1–2)
- Gina Ravera as Irene Daniels, LAPD detective, is the forensic accounting specialist (regular: seasons 3–4; recurring: seasons 1–2)
- Phillip P. Keene as Buzz Watson, LAPD civilian surveillance coordinator, handles video and audio tasks (regular: seasons 4–7; recurring: seasons 1–3)
- Mary McDonnell as Sharon Raydor, LAPD captain, Force Investigation Division, is also Women's Coordinator for the LAPD (regular: season 7; recurring: seasons 5–6)

== Cultural impact ==
Both gender researchers and members of the media have claimed that the series "expanded the vocabulary of what is acceptable for women as seen through the lens of popular culture."

"We've certainly seen women in powerful positions before," says author and gender researcher Maddy Dychtwald, pointing out Angie Dickinson in 1974's Police Woman, and Cagney & Lacey from 1981. "But those women were largely token in a sea of dominant males, and most important, strove to be like the men that surrounded them." In contrast, Dychtwald says the former CIA-trained interrogator and Atlanta police detective played by Kyra Sedgwick, "retains (and revels in) her femininity, keeps her composure, can handle the two 'sexist pigs' who bait her due to their jealousy and insecurities, and not lose her head."

Media experts also noted that the series helped redefine the place of basic cable channels alongside network programming:

Beyond gently tweaking the popular image of women in power, The Closer has helped redefine the power balance between basic cable and broadcast networks, says Fordham University media expert Paul Levinson. Just glance at the equal number of recent Emmy nominations for basic and premium cable shows is confirmation, he adds. Beyond that, says More Magazine Entertainment Director Kathy Heintzelman, the off-season placement—the show launched in the summer and continues to air its seasons in counterbalance to the traditional network schedule—has helped redefine viewing habits. "It's helped people get used to the idea that summer is a time to watch original series on televisions," she adds.

== U.S. television ratings ==
The Closer's debut was watched by more than 7 million viewers according to Nielsen Media Research and was the top-rated premiere episode ever of any original scripted series on basic cable. The second- (8.28) and third-season (8.81) premieres broke the previous record. Viewer numbers (based on average total viewers per episode) of The Closer on TNT:

Season	Season premiere			Season finale		
Season	Date	Viewers Total (in millions)	Viewers Households (in millions)	Date	Viewers Total (in millions)	Viewers Households (in millions)
1	June 13, 2005	7.03	5.26	September 5, 2005	6.39	4.61
2	June 12, 2006	8.28	6.04	September 4, 2006 (Note: Summer finales: Seasons two and three both aired two additional episodes in December. Seasons four and six were divided into 10 summer and five winter episodes and season five had 12 summer and three winter episodes.)	7.60	5.45
3	June 18, 2007	8.81	6.38	September 10, 2007	9.21	6.84
4	July 14, 2008	7.81	5.91	September 15, 2008	7.63	5.00
5	June 8, 2009	7.14	5.35	August 24, 2009	7.40	5.50
6	July 12, 2010	7.66	5.72	September 13, 2010	7.20	5.43
7	July 11, 2011	7.23	TBA	August 13, 2012	9.08	TBA

At the end of season three, The Closer became ad-supported cable's most-viewed scripted series of all time, ending the season with a live + same-day audience of 9.21 million viewers in 6.84 million households. The third-season finale holds the record for the largest live + 7-day audience for a single episode of an ad-supported cable series with 9.55 million viewers in 6.88 million households. Live + 7 day (DVR) data for the season reflect 30–40% audience growth in three key age-based demographic groups. Season four's premiere slipped slightly from the season-three opening, with live + same-day ratings showing a 3% decline in audience from the previous year's opener. For its Season Six premiere, on July 12, 2010, the show reached an estimated 7.66 million viewers.

== Home media ==
Warner Home Video has released all seven seasons of The Closer on DVD in Region 1.

DVD title	Region 1	Region 4 (Australia)	Region 2 (Germany)	Region 2 (France)
The Complete First Season	May 29, 2007	February 7, 2007	December 13, 2013	April 18, 2007
The Complete Second Season	May 29, 2007	October 3, 2007	November 29, 2013	July 18, 2007
The Complete Third Season	July 1, 2008	October 1, 2008	January 17, 2014	August 27, 2008
The Complete Fourth Season	May 26, 2009	March 3, 2010	January 17, 2014	October 28, 2009
The Complete Fifth Season	June 29, 2010	November 10, 2010	January 17, 2014	March 2, 2011
The Complete Sixth Season	June 21, 2011	November 2, 2011	January 17, 2014	March 7, 2012
The Complete Seventh and Final Season	August 21, 2012	October 27, 2012	February 7, 2014	August 28, 2013
The Complete Series 1–7	N/A	October 31, 2012	December 18, 2014	October 16, 2013

Season	Episodes	Originally released	
Season	Episodes	First released	Last released
1	13	June 13, 2005	September 5, 2005
2	15	June 12, 2006	December 4, 2006
3	15	June 18, 2007	December 3, 2007
4	15	July 14, 2008	February 23, 2009
5	15	June 8, 2009	December 21, 2009
6	15	July 12, 2010	January 3, 2011
7	21	July 11, 2011	August 13, 2012

== Awards and accolades ==
Until the Primetime Emmy Awards in 2011, Kyra Sedgwick had made history as being the only actress in the history of television to be nominated for an Emmy, Golden Globe, and Screen Actors Guild award every year that the show aired in the eligibility period.

List of Screen Actors Guild Award nominations
Award	Date of ceremony	Category	Nominee	Result
12th Screen Actors Guild Awards (2005)	January 29, 2006	Female Actor in a Drama Series	Kyra Sedgwick	Nominated
12th Screen Actors Guild Awards (2005)	January 29, 2006	Ensemble in a Drama Series	Regular Cast	Nominated
13th Screen Actors Guild Awards (2006)	January 28, 2007	Female Actor in a Drama Series	Kyra Sedgwick	Nominated
14th Screen Actors Guild Awards (2007)	January 27, 2008	Female Actor in a Drama Series	Kyra Sedgwick	Nominated
14th Screen Actors Guild Awards (2007)	January 27, 2008	Ensemble in a Drama Series	Regular Cast	Nominated
15th Screen Actors Guild Awards (2008)	January 25, 2009	Female Actor in a Drama Series	Kyra Sedgwick	Nominated
15th Screen Actors Guild Awards (2008)	January 25, 2009	Ensemble in a Drama Series	Regular Cast	Nominated
16th Screen Actors Guild Awards (2009)	January 23, 2010	Female Actor in a Drama Series	Kyra Sedgwick	Nominated
16th Screen Actors Guild Awards (2009)	January 23, 2010	Ensemble in a Drama Series	Regular Cast	Nominated
16th Screen Actors Guild Awards (2009)	January 23, 2010	Stunt Ensemble in a Television Series	Stunt Team	Nominated
17th Screen Actors Guild Awards (2010)	January 30, 2011	Female Actor in a Drama Series	Kyra Sedgwick	Nominated
17th Screen Actors Guild Awards (2010)	January 30, 2011	Ensemble in a Drama Series	Regular Cast	Nominated
17th Screen Actors Guild Awards (2010)	January 30, 2011	Stunt Ensemble in a Television Series	Stunt Team	Nominated
18th Screen Actors Guild Awards (2011)	January 29, 2012	Female Actor in a Drama Series	Kyra Sedgwick	Nominated

List of Saturn Award nominations
Award	Date of ceremony	Category	Nominee	Result
32nd Saturn Awards (2005)	May 2, 2006	Best Syndicated/Cable Television Series		Nominated
33rd Saturn Awards (2006)	May 10, 2007	Best Syndicated/Cable Television Series		Nominated
33rd Saturn Awards (2006)	May 10, 2007	Best Actress on Television	Kyra Sedgwick	Nominated
34th Saturn Awards (2007)	June 24, 2008	Best Syndicated/Cable Television Series		Nominated
34th Saturn Awards (2007)	June 24, 2008	Best Actress on Television	Kyra Sedgwick	Nominated
35th Saturn Awards (2008)	June 25, 2009	Best Syndicated/Cable Television Series		Nominated
35th Saturn Awards (2008)	June 25, 2009	Best Actress on Television	Kyra Sedgwick	Nominated
36th Saturn Awards (2009)	June 24, 2010	Best Syndicated/Cable Television Series		Nominated
36th Saturn Awards (2009)	June 24, 2010	Best Actress on Television	Kyra Sedgwick	Nominated
37th Saturn Awards (2010)	June 23, 2011	Best Syndicated/Cable Television Series		Nominated
37th Saturn Awards (2010)	June 23, 2011	Best Actress on Television	Kyra Sedgwick	Nominated
38th Saturn Awards (2011)	July 26, 2012	Best Syndicated/Cable Television Series		Nominated
38th Saturn Awards (2011)	July 26, 2012	Best Actress on Television	Kyra Sedgwick	Nominated

List of Primetime Emmy Awards and nominations
Award	Date of ceremony	Category	Nominee	Result
58th Primetime Emmy Awards (2006)	August 27, 2006	Lead Actress in a Drama Series	Kyra Sedgwick	Nominated
59th Primetime Emmy Awards (2007)	September 16, 2007	Lead Actress in a Drama Series	Kyra Sedgwick	Nominated
60th Primetime Emmy Awards (2008)	September 21, 2008	Lead Actress in a Drama Series	Kyra Sedgwick	Nominated
61st Primetime Emmy Awards (2009)	September 20, 2009	Lead Actress in a Drama Series	Kyra Sedgwick	Nominated
62nd Primetime Emmy Awards (2010)	August 29, 2010	Lead Actress in a Drama Series	Kyra Sedgwick	Won
62nd Primetime Emmy Awards (2010)	August 29, 2010	Guest Actor in a Drama Series	Beau Bridges	Nominated
63rd Primetime Emmy Awards (2011)	September 18, 2011	Guest Actress in a Drama Series	Mary McDonnell	Nominated

List of Golden Globe Awards and nominations
Award	Date of ceremony	Category	Nominee	Result
63rd Golden Globe Awards (2006)	January 16, 2006	Best Actress – Television Series Drama	Kyra Sedgwick	Nominated
64th Golden Globe Awards (2007)	January 15, 2007	Best Actress – Television Series Drama	Kyra Sedgwick	Won
65th Golden Globe Awards (2008)	January 13, 2008	Best Actress – Television Series Drama	Kyra Sedgwick	Nominated
66th Golden Globe Awards (2009)	January 11, 2009	Best Actress – Television Series Drama	Kyra Sedgwick	Nominated
67th Golden Globe Awards (2010)	January 17, 2010	Best Actress – Television Series Drama	Kyra Sedgwick	Nominated
68th Golden Globe Awards (2011)	January 16, 2011	Best Actress – Television Series Drama	Kyra Sedgwick	Nominated

List of other awards and nominations
Award	Date of ceremony	Category	Nominee	Result
Satellite Awards (2005)	December 17, 2005	Best Actress – Television Series Drama	Kyra Sedgwick	Won
Imagen Awards (2006)	August 18, 2006	Best Supporting Actor	Raymond Cruz	Won
Imagen Awards (2006)	August 18, 2006	Best Supporting Actress	Gina Ravera	Nominated
Satellite Awards (2006)	December 18, 2006	Best Actress – Television Series Drama	Kyra Sedgwick	Won
Gracie Awards (2006)		Female Lead in a Drama Series	Kyra Sedgwick	Won
Satellite Awards (2007)	December 16, 2007	Best Actress – Television Series Drama	Kyra Sedgwick	Nominated
Writers Guild of America Awards (2007)	February 9, 2008	Episodic Drama	"The Round File"	Nominated
Satellite Awards (2008)	December 14, 2008	Best Actress – Television Series Drama	Kyra Sedgwick	Nominated
35th People's Choice Awards (2008)	January 7, 2009	Favorite TV Drama Diva	Kyra Sedgwick	Won
PRISM Awards (2008)		Best Drama Episode	"Till Death Do Us" Parts 1 and 2	Nominated
41st NAACP Image Awards (2010)	February 26, 2010	Supporting Actor in a Drama Series	Corey Reynolds	Nominated
PRISM Awards (2011)		Best Drama Series Episode	"Old Money"	Nominated
PRISM Awards (2011)		Best Performance in a Drama Episode	Anthony John Dennison	Nominated
GoldDerby SNUBBEE Awards (2011)		Outstanding Snubbed Lead Actress (Comedy or Drama)	Kyra Sedgwick	Nominated

== Syndication and streaming ==
The Closer has been airing in reruns on Lifetime, Start TV, and TNT (its original network) during the years since its finale. MyNetworkTV acquired the broadcast syndication rights to the series, premiering on September 30, 2015 after airing on broadcast syndication since 2010.

== International distribution ==
- Latin America: Space, TNT Series
- Albania: TVSH
- Australia: Nine Network, GEM
- Austria: ORF, ATV
- Belgium: 2BE, VIJF, 13th Street
- Brazil: SBT, TNT Séries
- Bulgaria: Nova Television (Seasons one-three)(new season sx), Diema 2 (season four–present), Fox Crime (repeats)
- Canada English: Super Channel
- Canada French: Séries+
- Croatia: HRT 2
- Denmark: Kanal 4
- Estonia: Kanal 2
- Finland: MTV3, AXN Crime
- Norway: TVNorge
- France: France 2, Diva
- Georgia: Georgian Public Broadcaster
- Germany: VOX, WarnerTV Serie
- Greece: Star Channel
- Hong Kong: ViuTVsix
- Hungary: RTL Klub, VIASAT3
- Ireland: Channel 6 now 3e/TV3
- Israel: Yes Action
- Italy: AXN, Mediaset Premium (pay); Italia 1, Rete 4 (free)
- Japan: LaLa TV
- Lithuania: BTV
- Malaysia: WarnerTV
- Netherlands: NET 5, 13th Street
- New Zealand: TV One, TV2
- Philippines: Jack City
- Poland: TVP2, 13th Street Universal Poland
- Portugal: Fox Crime
- Russia: DTV, Diva Universal
- Singapore: WarnerTV
- Serbia: TV Avala
- Slovenia: Kanal A (Seasons 1–4), POP Brio (season five–present)
- South Korea: Story on, OCN Series
- Spain: Calle 13, Cuatro, FDF, Divinity
- Sweden: TV3
- Switzerland: RTS Un, RSI La 1
- Turkey: CNBC-e, AXN
- United Kingdom: FOX UK, More4
- Uruguay: Canal 10
- South Africa: M-Net
