= Brenda Leigh Johnson =

Fictional character featured in TNT's The Closer

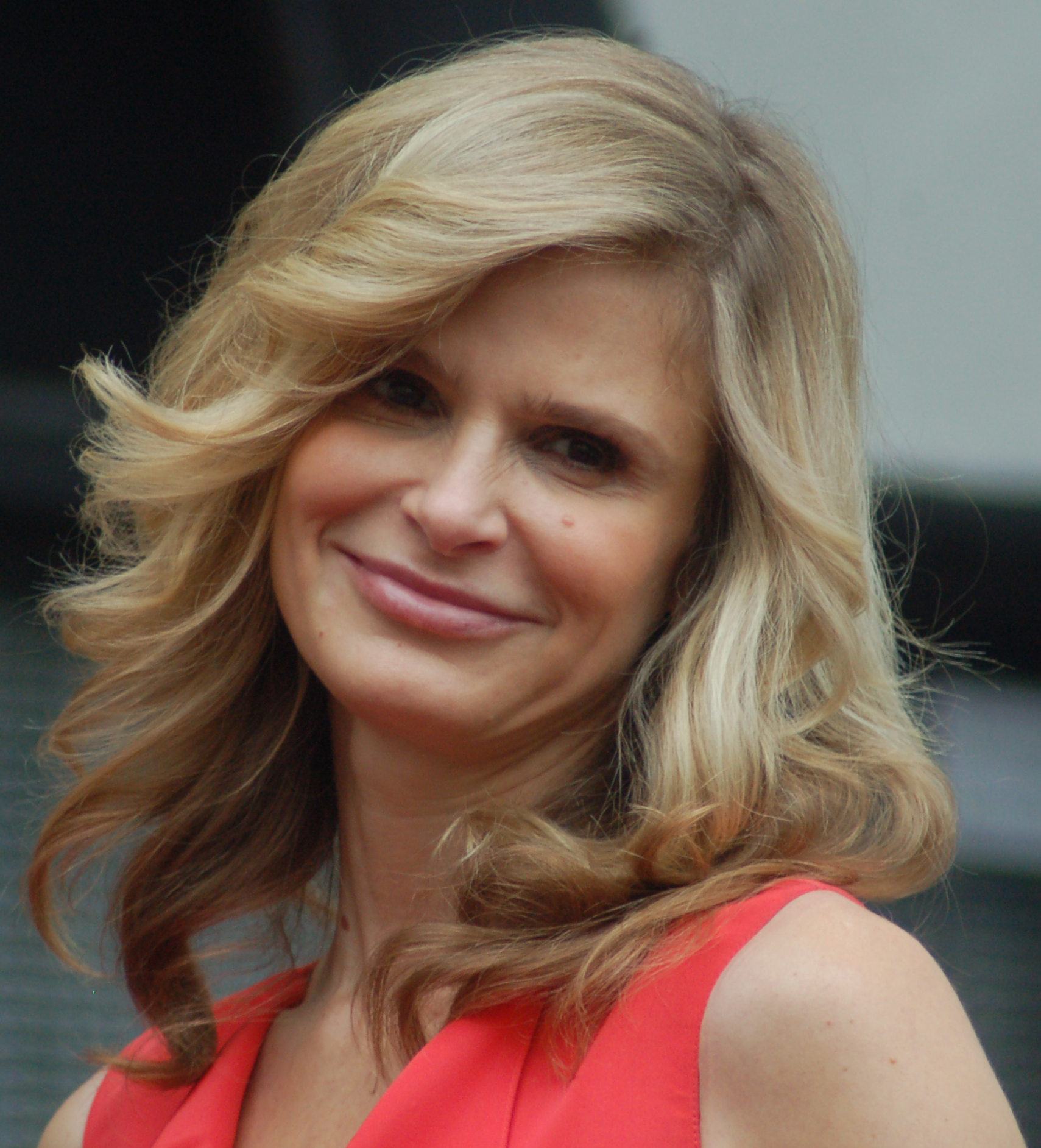
- Kyra Sedgwick as Brenda Leigh Johnson (2009)
- First appearance: "Pilot"
- Last appearance: "The Last Word"
- Created by: James Duff
- Portrayed by: Kyra Sedgwick

In-universe information
- Gender: Female
- Occupation: LAPD Deputy Chief
- Family: Willie Rae Johnson (mother; deceased); Clay Johnson (father)
- Spouses: Unnamed Ex-Husband (divorced); Fritz Howard (m. 2009)
- Relatives: Charlene "Charlie" Johnson (niece)

Deputy Chief Brenda Leigh Johnson (portrayed by Kyra Sedgwick) is a fictional character and the main protagonist featured in TNT's The Closer. She heads the Major Crimes Division (formerly the Priority Homicide Division) of the Los Angeles Police Department. She is portrayed as an intelligent, determined, and exacting woman. The character has a tendency to offend coworkers and other people involved in her cases but is skilled at determining the facts of a crime, compelling confessions, and closing cases. Thus, she is "a closer".

For her portrayal of Johnson, Sedgwick earned six consecutive nominations for Golden Globe Award for Best Actress – Television Series Drama (winning once), five consecutive nominations for the Primetime Emmy Award for Outstanding Lead Actress in a Drama Series (winning once), and seven nominations for Screen Actors Guild Award for Outstanding Performance by a Female Actor in a Drama Series.

== Biographical information ==
Brenda's parents are Clay and Willie Rae Johnson. Her father is a career officer in the U.S. Air Force. She and her three brothers (Clay Jr., Bobby, and Jimmy) grew up traveling from base to base with their father. Her parents are both Southerners who retire to Atlanta. Brenda graduates from Georgetown University. She spends seven years with the Central Intelligence Agency, four years with the Metropolitan Police Department of the District of Columbia (MPD), and three and a half years with the Atlanta Police Department before moving to the LAPD.

During season two, Brenda celebrates her 40th birthday.

=== Washington, D.C. ===
While living in Washington, D.C., the CIA train Brenda to be an interrogator. After joining the MPD, she becomes involved with her married boss, Will Pope. After refusing to leave his wife, Pope breaks up with Brenda. However, he later divorces that wife to marry his next, Estelle. During this time, the character also meets Fritz Howard, an FBI agent then working in D.C. who transferred to Los Angeles 3½ years before the show begins. Thus, Fritz leaves D.C. for L.A. slightly before Brenda leaves D.C. for Atlanta. Fritz knows about Brenda and Pope's relationship in D.C. The members of her division in L.A. do not learn of the relationship until Pope and Estelle divorce, which causes Estelle to confront Brenda in front of her entire division, accusing Brenda of wanting to sleep with Pope "again".

=== Atlanta, Georgia ===
Next, Brenda is a captain with the Atlanta Police Department. Her then-husband makes false allegations of her having an affair with a younger police officer, which results in an ethics investigation while she is a member of the APD. Brenda believes that her husband does this because he is jealous of the time she dedicates to her work. The marriage is difficult, and they divorce soon afterward:

If I liked being called a bitch to my face, I'd still be married.

After being cleared of the ethics violation, Brenda seeks a new job. She is offered a position with Homeland Security but declines the offer so that she could head the LAPD's new Priority Homicide Division.

=== Los Angeles, California ===
Brenda's friend (and former lover) Assistant Chief Will Pope is responsible for her coming to the LAPD and is again her boss. His motivation in wanting her for the job is that the squad fail to provide cases the prosecutors could win.

During her first case, Brenda is told that she will not be able to obtain DNA results from the LAPD for many weeks, so she contacts associates at the FBI. Fritz notices that the results are for Brenda and personally delivers them. Brenda and Fritz later become involved and eventually marry.

In 2012, Deputy Chief Johnson retires from the LAPD and takes a job as Chief of the Los Angeles County District Attorney Bureau of Investigation.

== Work life ==
When Johnson starts leading the Priority Homicide Division, the squad gives her a cold reception. En masse they apply for a transfer in support of the former head of the division, then-Captain, now-Commander Taylor. She dismisses the lack of acceptance and throws their applications into the trash can in front of them. Her peers in the department are also resentful of the rank she was given when she joined the LAPD. Compounding this, Brenda alienates the FBI and the L.A. District Attorney's office. However, she earns Taylor's respect by solving the murder of his family friend's son.

=== Pope divorce proceedings ===
Chief Pope and his estranged second wife, Estelle, eventually divorce. While undergoing divorce proceedings, Pope asks Brenda to go through a deposition at his custody hearing. She agrees. Pope gains custody of his children. Estelle, furious at Brenda for her deposition, forces her way to the Squad Room and yells at Brenda, in front of everyone, that "she'd better not find out that she is sleeping with Pope again". Everyone present in the squad room, including Commander Taylor, learns that Brenda had an affair with Pope. They ask the inevitable question, "was she transferred here and given such a high rank due to her relationship with Pope?" Brenda is embarrassed and refuses to talk about the subject. Commander Taylor later makes a statement in front of the entire squad, discredits what Estelle said, and states that Brenda was falsely accused. Brenda later gathers all the pictures and memories of her past relationship with Pope and throws them out in the office trash.

=== Stroh case ===
By the end of season four (episode 4.13: "Power of Attorney"), Major Crimes Division is investigating a murder linked to six counts of rape. On their hands, they have Chris Dunlap, a thirty-something-year-old who was found hiding in a tree on the night of the murder. When Brenda nearly gets a confession, she is interrupted by the arrival of Dunlap's attorney, Phillip Stroh (Billy Burke). After being caught in several of Stroh's tricks, such as being forced to open up her case to him by Deputy District Attorney Martin Garnett, Brenda gets Dunlap to confess to being the accomplice in the rapes. When she learns that Dunlap never participated in the crime and asks him who was committing the crimes, she is shocked that he accuses his lawyer, Phillip Stroh. Brenda is outsmarted by the clever attorney and doesn't get a confession from him; moreover, the warrant put on Stroh's home serves no good leads, leaving the case open.

When Brenda becomes overly obsessed with her only unclosed investigation, she starts to have terrifying nightmares of Stroh breaking into her apartment and attacking her, (episode 5.8: "Elysian Fields"). Brenda's free time is committed to solving the case on her own, which crosses over into the time that Fritz would like to spend with her.

In the series finale, episode 7.21 titled "The Last Word" (2012), two men trysting in a secluded park witness a masked man carrying a naked woman's body and flee the scene. The culprit chases and struggles with one of them (teenaged survival sex prostitute Rusty Beck), who pulls off the culprit's mask and uses his john's cellphone to dial 911 to report the crime. Brenda and her team find the body and use the clues found at the serial killer's burial ground and through the phone call to track down the two witnesses and tentatively identify the culprit as Stroh. To positively identify Stroh and close her final case, however, Brenda must employ non-traditional means that cost her her job and come close to costing Beck and Brenda their lives. Brenda lures Stroh to reveal himself by publicizing in the media pictures of Beck wearing the serial killer's mask as a hat and phoning 911, along with the audio and transcripts of that call. Stroh takes the bait, approaching Beck on the street, and is hauled into an investigation with MCD. There, Brenda threatens that she has his DNA, and Stroh, revealing he closely follows every detail of her life, taunts Brenda about her mother's recent death. Brenda attacks him, drawing blood and skin fragments that she and her friend at the DA's office convince the crime lab to match against DNA taken from Stroh's mask. That evening, when Fritz has left for Washington, D.C., to expedite the case, Stroh breaks into Brenda's house, holds Beck at knifepoint, and attacks Brenda. Brenda shoots him, but - although tempted as well as urged by Beck to kill Stroh - she is haunted by memories of the Turrell Baylor case and her own conscience and calls an ambulance, instead. Stroh offers a confession, but Brenda uncharacteristically does not want to hear it. This reflects a new kind of "closer", reflecting that she has learned from her mother's death and from Beck's comments and the life story and must instead focus on the living, not the dead.

== Other information ==
- Brenda Leigh Johnson often pretends to be a dumb blonde in order to deceive suspects and defense attorneys.
- Brenda will come to implement very questionable strategies to make the guilty suffer a punishment, so to speak, of another type: even decreeing, indirectly, their death. For example, freeing a subject knowing that he will be executed by the same criminals.
- Johnson obtained her house and cat from a murder victim whose case she solved.
- Brenda speaks "German, Russian, and [is] fully conversant in Czech" (although she is never heard conversing in any of these languages onscreen) but does not speak Spanish. Thus she feels somewhat at a disadvantage in Los Angeles.

== Awards and decorations ==
The following are the medals and service awards fictionally worn by Deputy Chief Johnson.

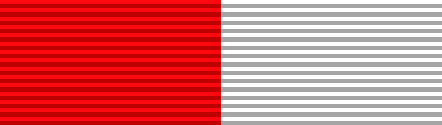
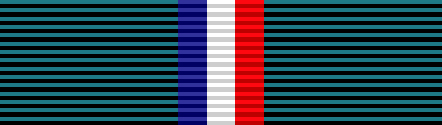
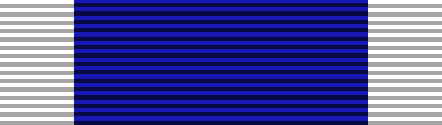
LAPD Police Medal for Heroism
LAPD Police Life-Saving Medal
LAPD Police Meritorious Achievement Medal
LAPD Sharpshooter Medal
