= Michael M. Robin =

American television director

- Born: Michael M. Robin; United States
- Occupations: Executive producer Television producer Director; Television writer
- Years active: 1986-present

Michael M. Robin is an American television producer and director who has worked on such series as All Rise, NYPD Blue, Nip/Tuck, Popular, The Closer, Rizzoli & Isles, Major Crimes, and Dallas. He has earned producing Primetime Emmy Awards for NYPD Blue and L.A. Law as well as three Golden Globe Awards for Nip/Tuck, NYPD Blue and L.A. Law.

== Early career ==
Robin began his career as a production assistant on the series L.A. Law, where he worked his way up to Producer in the fourth season and later received a Primetime Emmy Award for his work on the series. He then segued to Cop Rock as a Producer, where he made his directorial debut. He added a second producing Primetime Emmy Award and Directing nomination for his work on NYPD Blue. Robin spent 11 years working for Steven Bochco before branching out on his own on the ABC TV show C-16.

== Work ==
Following C-16, Robin formed The Shephard/Robin Company with Greer Shephard in 1998. Their producing success included Nip/Tuck, The Closer, Longmire, Major Crimes, Trust Me, State of Mind, The D.A., Popular and Brutally Normal.

Robin has directed 15 drama pilots, including the pilots for CBS's All Rise, TNT's The Closer, Rizzoli & Isles, Major Crimes and Dallas. He also helmed the pilot for Valor on The CW.

He is currently developing the VR Narrative Series Splash/Damage with WEVR and Warner Brothers' Blue Ribbon Content. Michael also directed and produced The Berlin Wall VR Experience for the Newseum in Washington DC. He is also a member of the advisory board of Streamspace, the leader in blockchain Streaming on Demand Video/SVOD.

In 2017, Robin launched a new venture, Skyemac Productions, under the Warner Brothers banner. Its first production is "All Rise", which is now in its second season on CBS.
