= Major case squad =

Police department division

A major case squad is a division within some police departments. The detectives of these divisions typically investigate crimes beyond the scope of normal squads. These functions vary from department to department.

== New York City Police Department ==
The major case squad of the New York City Police Department is located at One Police Plaza in Manhattan, New York City. The squad investigates the following types of cases:

- Art theft
- Burglary or attempted burglary of a bank or bank safe
- Burglary of truck contents over $100,000
- All commercial burglaries in which the value of the property stolen exceeds $100,000
- Kidnappings, as directed by the Chief of Detectives
- Larceny by extortion, or attempted larceny by extortion, from a bank
- Larceny of truck contents over $100,000.
- Robbery, or attempted robbery, of a bank by an armed perpetrator
- All robberies in warehouse depots, or similar locations, where the objects of the crime is a truck or its contents
- Robbery of truck and contents by hijacking

The New York City Major Case Squad does not normally investigate homicides: Those are generally conducted by precinct detective squads and borough homicide squads; the exceptions involve homicides committed by violent criminal organizations that fall under larger federal RICO investigations and prosecutions, as well as the murder of police officers. On the matter of the homicides of police officers, the major case squad was originally formed in response to the wave of assassinations of police officers in the late 1960s and early 1970s. The ultimate responsibility for any homicide case in NYC rests with the precinct detective squad concerned, but the major case squad has historically played a large and important role in the investigation of any homicide of an NYC police officer.

== St. Louis ==
The Major Case Squad of Greater St. Louis was formed in 1965 and is a multi-departmental unit charged with investigating major crimes in six Missouri and four Illinois counties. The squad brings together specially trained, and highly experienced investigators and averages an 80% clearance rate.
