= Mrs. Hudson =

Fictional character created by Arthur Conan Doyle

- Sherlock Holmes character
- First appearance: A Study in Scarlet (1887)
- Last appearance: "The Adventure of the Three Garridebs" (1924)
- Created by: Arthur Conan Doyle

In-universe information
- Occupation: Landlady
- Nationality: British

Mrs. Hudson is a fictional character in the Sherlock Holmes novels and short stories by Arthur Conan Doyle. She is the landlady of 221B Baker Street, the London residence in which Sherlock Holmes lives.

Mrs. Hudson appears or is mentioned in many Sherlock Holmes stories, though her appearances are generally brief, and little information is given about the character. She has been made a more prominent character in multiple Sherlock Holmes adaptations in film, television, and other media.

== Fictional character biography ==
=== History ===
Mrs. Hudson is the landlady of 221B Baker Street, the London residence where Sherlock Holmes and Dr. Watson live in many of the stories. In the short story "The Adventure of the Naval Treaty", Holmes says "Her cuisine is a little limited, but she has as good an idea of breakfast as a Scotchwoman", which some readers have taken to mean that she is Scottish. Other than one mention of her "stately tread" in the novel A Study in Scarlet, she is given no physical description or first name, although some commentators have identified her with the "Martha" in "His Last Bow".

In the first Sherlock Holmes story, A Study in Scarlet, there is a landlady of 221B Baker Street, though her name is not given. The landlady is identified as Mrs. Hudson in the following story, The Sign of the Four. At one point in "A Scandal in Bohemia", Holmes calls the landlady "Mrs. Turner", rather than Mrs. Hudson, which has caused much speculation among Holmes fans. It has been suggested that Mrs. Turner was substituting for Mrs. Hudson or that Holmes or Watson mistakenly used the wrong name, though it may have simply been an error by Doyle, since the name Mrs. Turner also appeared in an early draft of "The Adventure of the Empty House" but was corrected to Mrs. Hudson. When Holmes is in retirement in Sussex in "The Adventure of the Lion's Mane", he says he is living with his "old housekeeper", which some readers believe is Mrs. Hudson.

Holmes tells Watson in "The Adventure of the Empty House" that his sudden return to Baker Street three years after his supposed death "threw Mrs. Hudson into violent hysterics". In the same story, Watson notes that their old Baker Street rooms are unchanged due to "the supervision of Mycroft Holmes and the immediate care of Mrs. Hudson". Mrs. Hudson also places herself in danger to assist Holmes in the story, by carefully moving a bust of Holmes every quarter of an hour to fool a sniper, Colonel Sebastian Moran, into thinking the bust is actually Holmes. When Moran fires his gun, the bullet passes through the bust and hits the wall, after which it is picked up by Mrs. Hudson. She expresses dismay that the bust of Holmes was spoiled by the bullet and presents the bullet to Holmes.

There is no mention in the stories of Mrs. Hudson's husband. It has been suggested as a possibility that she was never married, since the title "Mrs." was used in the Victorian era as a respectful title for high-ranking domestic staff, regardless of marital status. While no relatives of Mrs. Hudson's are identified in the stories, she shares her surname with a character in "The Adventure of the Gloria Scott" and another in "The Adventure of the Six Napoleons". There are also characters in "The Boscombe Valley Mystery" with the surname Turner, a name which may or may not be connected with Mrs. Hudson in "A Scandal in Bohemia".

=== Personality ===
Watson describes the relationship between Holmes and Hudson in the opening of "The Adventure of the Dying Detective":

Mrs. Hudson, the landlady of Sherlock Holmes, was a long-suffering woman. Not only was her first-floor flat invaded at all hours by throngs of singular and often undesirable characters but her remarkable lodger showed an eccentricity and irregularity in his life which must have sorely tried her patience. His incredible untidiness, his addiction to music at strange hours, his occasional revolver practice within doors, his weird and often malodorous scientific experiments, and the atmosphere of violence and danger which hung around him made him the very worst tenant in London. On the other hand, his payments were princely. I have no doubt that the house might have been purchased at the price which Holmes paid for his rooms during the years that I was with him. The landlady stood in the deepest awe of him and never dared to interfere with him, however outrageous his proceedings might seem. She was fond of him, too, for he had a remarkable gentleness and courtesy in his dealings with women.

In The Sign of the Four, she worries about Holmes's health after hearing him spend the night pacing up and down. In "The Adventure of the Naval Treaty", she apparently plays along with Holmes's dramatic reveal of the missing treaty to Mr. Phelps by serving Mr. Phelps a covered dish with the recovered treaty inside. Mrs. Hudson is displeased on the two occasions Holmes is visited by a dirty group of Baker Street Irregulars, expressing "disgust" when the Irregulars arrive in A Study in Scarlet and "dismay" when they appear in The Sign of the Four. In "The Adventure of the Speckled Band", Mrs. Hudson is woken up early by the appearance of a client for Holmes and, by the time Watson is up, has "had the good sense to light the fire" according to Holmes.

=== Occupation ===
She is the landlady of 221B Baker Street, and also appears to perform various tasks such as preparing meals. Holmes praises her "excellent" breakfasts in "The Adventure of the Naval Treaty" and "The Adventure of Black Peter". She serves curried chicken in "The Adventure of the Naval Treaty" and woodcock in "The Adventure of the Blue Carbuncle". She sometimes escorts visitors up the steps to Holmes's flat, such as Inspectors Gregson and Baynes in "The Adventure of Wisteria Lodge" and some sailors in "The Adventure of Black Peter". She also occasionally brings Holmes a card or telegram on a tray, for instance when she brings Holmes the card of John Garrideb in "The Adventure of the Three Garridebs" and a telegram in "The Adventure of the Dancing Men".

In addition to the page Billy, Mrs. Hudson employs a live-in maid at Baker Street. Watson hears the maid going to bed while he is waiting up for Holmes in A Study in Scarlet, and waits for the maid to bring him coffee in "The Five Orange Pips". She brings Holmes a telegram in "The Adventure of the Bruce-Partington Plans". It has been suggested that this maid could be the Mrs. Turner who appears in "A Scandal in Bohemia".

== Popular image ==
Though limited information is given about Mrs. Hudson in the original stories, the character has developed a popular image due to portrayals in adaptations and speculation in articles and books, according to a 2005 essay by Catherine Cooke. Cooke writes that Mrs. Hudson is "a nice, motherly individual getting on in years [...] At least, this is how she is usually conceived. It is a portrait perpetuated in numerous films and television adaptations: Minnie Rayner in the Arthur Wontner films, Mary Gordon in the Basil Rathbone films, Irene Handl in The Private Life of Sherlock Holmes, and Rosalie Williams in the Jeremy Brett series".

Cooke also adds that essays written about Mrs. Hudson have influenced the general conception of the character, one of the most influential being "The Singular Adventures of Martha Hudson" by Vincent Starrett, originally published in 1934. Starrett suggested that Mrs. Hudson's first name is Martha, and described Mrs. Hudson as a "housekeeper", though in the original stories she is only referred to as a "landlady", which is a separate occupation. Cooke writes that "most American Sherlockians until relatively recently seem to have accepted Starrett's fancies", but adds that British Sherlockians were less likely to identify Mrs. Hudson as "Martha" or confuse her position as a landlady with that of a housekeeper.

Daniel Smith writes that, though few details are given about Mrs. Hudson in Doyle's stories, the character "has become one of the iconic figures of Sherlock Holmes's world" due largely to portrayals of the character in film and television. According to Smith, "Mary Gordon in the Rathbone films and Rosalie Williams in the Granada TV series did much to form the popular image of the landlady". Smith also comments that Gordon, Williams, and other actresses such as Irene Handl and Una Stubbs have provided "memorable portrayals of the occasionally tetchy but ultimately sympathetic stalwart of 221B" and helped cement Mrs Hudson's place in the public consciousness.

== Adaptations ==
=== Film ===
Mme. d'Esterre played Mrs. Hudson in multiple titles in the 1921–1923 Stoll film series starring Eille Norwood as Holmes, including the short films The Dying Detective (1921) and The Man with the Twisted Lip (1921), as well as the feature films The Hound of the Baskervilles (1921) and The Sign of Four (1923).

Other actresses who have played Mrs. Hudson in films include Minnie Rayner in The Sleeping Cardinal (1931), The Missing Rembrandt (1932), The Triumph of Sherlock Holmes (1935) and Silver Blaze (1937), Marie Ault in The Speckled Band (1931), Clare Greet in The Sign of Four (1932), and Tempe Pigott in A Study in Scarlet (1933).

Mary Gordon played Mrs. Hudson in the Sherlock Holmes 1939–1946 film series starring Basil Rathbone as Holmes and Nigel Bruce as Watson. Gordon's portrayal of Mrs. Hudson, along with the later portrayal of the character by Rosalie Williams in the Granada television series, helped establish the popular image of Mrs. Hudson.

Mrs. Hudson was played by Edith Schultze-Westrum in Sherlock Holmes and the Deadly Necklace (1962), Barbara Leake in A Study in Terror (1965), Irene Handl in The Private Life of Sherlock Holmes (1970), Alison Leggatt in The Seven-Per-Cent Solution (1976), Betty Woolfe in Murder by Decree (1979), and Pat Keen in Without a Clue (1988). Mrs. Hudson appears in the 2002 anime film Case Closed: The Phantom of Baker Street, in which she is voiced by Kei Hayami in the original Japanese release, and Emily Gray in the English-language dub.

Geraldine James portrayed Mrs. Hudson in Guy Ritchie's 2009 film Sherlock Holmes and the following 2011 film Sherlock Holmes: A Game of Shadows. Mrs. Hudson was played by Sarah Crowden in Mr. Holmes (2015) and by Kelly Macdonald in Holmes and Watson (2018).

=== Television ===
Mrs. Hudson has been portrayed by multiple actresses in television films and series, including Violet Besson in The Three Garridebs (1937), Iris Vandeleur in the 1951 television series, Mary Holder, Enid Lindsey, and Grace Arnold in the 1965–1968 television series, Marguerite Young in Doctor Watson and the Darkwater Hall Mystery (1974), Marjorie Bennett in Sherlock Holmes in New York (1976), Rina Zelyonaya in the 1979–1987 Soviet television film series The Adventures of Sherlock Holmes and Dr. Watson, and Pat Keen in The Baker Street Boys (1983) as well as in the 1988 film Without a Clue. In the 1983 animated television adaptation of The Sign of Four, she was voiced by Lynn Rainbow.

In Granada Television's Sherlock Holmes series (1984–1994), Mrs. Hudson was played by Rosalie Williams. Williams, along with Mary Gordon in the Rathbone films, did much to form the popular image of Mrs. Hudson.

In the TMS anime series Sherlock Hound (1984–1985) directed by Hayao Miyazaki, Mrs. Hudson is depicted as a much younger woman in her early to mid 20s, and a widow of a pilot named Jim. In this incarnation, her full name is revealed to be Marie Hudson, and fitting with the theme of the characters being canines, she resembles a Golden Retriever. She normally stays behind at 221B Baker Street, but accompanies Hound and Watson on a few cases, usually any that involve something related to flight, and is shown to be a very skilled driver, pilot, and markswoman. She is once kidnapped by Professor Moriarty and his henchmen as a part of a scheme to defeat Hound, though Moriarty vows to never involve her in his schemes after she shows him kindness during the time she's kept as a hostage. Additionally, it's shown that most of the main male cast of the series (namely Hound and especially Watson) are attracted to her. She is voiced by Yōko Asagami in the original Japanese release and by Patricia Parris in the English-language dub.

Mrs. Hudson was portrayed by Jenny Laird in The Masks of Death (1984), Margaret John in the television films Sherlock Holmes and the Leading Lady (1991) and Incident at Victoria Falls (1992), and Kathleen McAuliffe in the television films The Royal Scandal (2001) and The Case of the Whitechapel Vampire (2002).

In the BBC series Sherlock (2010–2017), she is played by actress and TV presenter Una Stubbs. She offers Holmes a lower rent because he helped her out by ensuring the conviction and execution of her husband in Florida after he murdered two people. In "A Scandal in Belgravia" when agents torture Mrs. Hudson trying to find a mobile phone, Sherlock repeatedly throws the agent responsible out of an upper-level window, and later states that "England would fall" if Mrs. Hudson left Baker Street. In "His Last Vow" her name is revealed to be Martha Louise Hudson (née Sissons), a semi-reformed alcoholic and former exotic dancer. Her "pressure point", according to Charles Augustus Magnussen’s information on her, is marijuana.

A transgender Ms. Hudson appears in the 19th episode of the US series Elementary, "Snow Angels" (2013), as an expert in Ancient Greek who essentially makes a living as a kept woman and muse for various wealthy men; Holmes allows her to stay in the apartment after a break-up, and she subsequently agrees to clean for them once a week as a source of income and to prevent Holmes from having to do it himself. She is portrayed by Candis Cayne.

Mrs. Hudson was portrayed by Ingeborga Dapkūnaitė in the Russian 2013 television series Sherlock Holmes.

In the NHK puppetry television series Sherlock Holmes (2014–2015), Mrs. Hudson (voiced by Keiko Horiuchi) is a jolly housemother of Baker House, one of the houses of Beeton School. She loves singing and baking biscuits and calls Holmes by his first name Sherlock. She is particularly kind to him and Watson because Holmes saves her when she is in a predicament in the first episode "The First Adventure", which was loosely based on A Study in Scarlet. In episode 11, loosely based on "The Adventure of the Speckled Band", she finds a big snake in the school.

In the anime television series Case File nº221: Kabukicho (2019–2020), a re-imagined version of the character is voiced by Junichi Suwabe in the original Japanese release, and by David Wald in the English-language dub.

Kana Asumi voices Mrs. Hudson in the anime series Moriarty the Patriot.

=== Audio ===
Mary Gordon, who played Mrs. Hudson in the 1939–1946 film series starring Basil Rathbone and Nigel Bruce, also portrayed Mrs. Hudson in the Sherlock Holmes radio series with Rathbone and Bruce, The New Adventures of Sherlock Holmes. Gordon played the character in multiple episodes, for example "The Night Before Christmas" (1945) and "The Adventure of the Tell-Tale Pigeon Feathers" (1946).

On various BBC radio stations, Mrs. Hudson was played by Dora Gregory in "The Adventure of the Speckled Band" (1945), Susan Richards in a different dramatisation of the same story in 1948, Elizabeth Maude in "The Dying Detective" and "The Second Stain" (both in 1954), Elsa Palmer in The Sign of Four (1959), Kathleen Helme in "The Naval Treaty" (1960), Penelope Lee in "The Valley of Fear" (1960), Gudrun Ure in "The Empty House" (1961), Beryl Calder in "Thor Bridge" (1962), and Grizelda Hervey in "The Sign of the Four" (1963). Barbara Mitchell portrayed Mrs. Hudson in "A Study in Scarlet" (1962), "The Five Orange Pips" (1966), "The Dying Detective" (1967), and "The Second Stain" (1967). Janet Morrison played Mrs. Hudson in "The Bruce-Partington Plans", "The Three Garridebs", "The Norwood Builder", and "The Retired Colourman" (all in 1964), plus "The Dancing Men", "The Lion's Mane", and "His Last Bow" (all in 1969). Cecile Chevreau played Mrs. Hudson in a 1970 LP record audio drama adaptation of "Charles Augustus Milverton".

In the 1989–1998 BBC radio series with Clive Merrison as Sherlock Holmes, Mrs. Hudson was portrayed by Anna Cropper in adaptations of A Study in Scarlet and The Sign of the Four (1989), by Mary Allen in adaptations of "A Scandal in Bohemia" and "The Noble Bachelor" (1990–91), by Joan Matheson in adaptations of "The Yellow Face", "The Empty House", "The Second Stain", "The Dying Detective", "The Mazarin Stone", "The Three Garridebs", and "The Retired Colourman" (1992–95), and by Judi Dench in the dramatisation of The Hound of the Baskervilles (1998).

Lee Paasch voiced Mrs. Hudson for Imagination Theatre's radio series The Further Adventures of Sherlock Holmes from 1998 until her death in 2013, and was the only actress to voice Mrs. Hudson in the related series by Imagination Theatre, The Classic Adventures of Sherlock Holmes (2005–2016), which adapted all of Doyle's Sherlock Holmes stories for radio. Mrs. Hudson is Holmes's client in an episode of The Further Adventures of Sherlock Holmes, "The Hudson Problem" (2006). Ellen McLain has played Mrs. Hudson on Imagination Theatre since 2019.

Mrs. Hudson was voiced by June Whitfield in the 1999 radio series The Newly Discovered Casebook of Sherlock Holmes. The character was played by Beth Chalmers in two Sherlock Holmes audio drama releases by Big Finish Productions, one released in 2011 titled Sherlock Holmes: The Final Problem/The Empty House, and one released in 2012 titled Sherlock Holmes: The Tangled Skein.

Moira Quirk voiced Mrs. Hudson in the 2014 L.A. Theatre Works audio dramatisation of The Hound of the Baskervilles. Mrs. Hudson was portrayed by Patricia Hodge in the 2-episode comedic radio play Mrs Hudson's Radio Show in 2018. The show presented a humorous take on Mrs Hudson's life in Baker Street.

Mrs. Hudson was played by Patricia Hodge in the 2018 radio series Mrs Hudson's Radio Show.

Mrs. Hudson's role in the 2023 podcast, Sherlock & Co., is re-worked as an estate agent Mariana Ametxazurra, played by Marta da Silva. While Holmes and Watson are looking to rent 221B, Sherlock mistakenly calls her "Mrs. Hudson" a number of times in the earlier stories, despite John and Mariana's constant corrections. Mariana ends up becoming a main part of Sherlock & Co. at the end of their first adventure (and adaptation of "The Illustrious Client") and moving into the downstairs apartment.

=== Print ===
Mrs. Clara (née Clarisa) Hudson is a much more developed character in Laurie R. King's series of novels focusing on the detective scholar Mary Russell. In this alternative extension of the Holmes mythology, the retired Holmes marries his much younger apprentice and partner. Russell and Holmes meet after the traumatic death of her family in California when she moves to the farm adjoining Holmes' Sussex home. Mrs. Hudson takes the young and emotionally fragile Russell under her wing, and Russell comes to think of her as a friend, a second mother, and a rock in the whirl of danger that always surrounds Holmes. The novel The Murder of Mary Russell (2016) tells Mrs. Hudson's biography over several generations, her meeting and bond with Holmes, and her ties to Russell. The novel appeared after the development of Mrs. Hudson's character in the BBC series Sherlock. As in that rendition of the character, Mrs. Hudson has a criminal past and initially met Holmes in unsavory circumstances, in this case when she murdered her father to save Holmes' life. Holmes buys the Baker St. house for Hudson and establishes her as his landlady. In typical Holmesian logic, this relieves him of the tedium of homeownership and explains both her forbearance with her tenant and his uncharacteristic affection for her. A skilled actress and con artist, she is comfortable with the criminals who inhabit his world and enjoys playing occasional roles in investigations in which an eminently respectable older woman might be needed. In this series, she is slightly older than Holmes (although Russell and Watson think she is significantly older), born in Scotland, raised in Australia, and an immigrant to England. She acted as a mother surrogate to Billy Mudd, Holmes' first 'Irregular', has one sister who lived to adulthood, and one illegitimate child of her own. Holmes states explicitly that the condition of her remaining in England and their relationship is that Hudson's life prior to the murder is never to be mentioned, that they must never have a sexual or romantic relationship, and that she know that her history as a criminal and murderer will always be present in his mind whenever they interact. To Holmes, Hudson represents a way of solving the ethical problem of what to do with someone who murders to prevent harm, but who may return to criminal activity. His manipulation of Hudson removes Hudson and Mudd from lives as criminals, keeps Hudson's infant from the workhouse, and provides Holmes with a housekeeper and intelligent ally.

In Sherlock Holmes' War of the Worlds (1975) it is suggested that Holmes and the younger Mrs. Hudson had a long-lasting love relationship, obvious to all but the naive Watson.

Mrs Hudson is the detective in the novels Mrs Hudson and the Spirits' Curse (2002), Mrs Hudson and the Malabar Rose (2005), Mrs Hudson and the Lazarus Testament (2015), and Mrs Hudson and the Samarkand Conspiracy (2020) by Martin Davies, and in Barry S. Brown's Mrs. Hudson of Baker Street series of novels, including The Unpleasantness at Parkerton Manor (2010), Mrs. Hudson and The Irish Invincibles (2011), Mrs. Hudson in the Ring (2013), Mrs. Hudson in New York (2015), and Mrs Hudson's Olympic Triumph (2017).

She is also a detective in The House at Baker Street (2016) and The Women of Baker Street (2017), by Michelle Birkby, and in Susan Knight's 2019 book Mrs Hudson Investigates. The 2017 book Memoirs from Mrs. Hudson's Kitchen, by Wendy Heyman-Marsaw, is written from Mrs. Hudson's perspective.

The 2012 book Mrs Hudson's Diaries: A View from the Landing at 221B was written by Barry Cryer and Bob Cryer. The comedic radio play Mrs. Hudson's Radio Show (2018) was based on the book.

The character Mrs. Judson in the Basil of Baker Street books is based on Mrs. Hudson.

A younger Mrs. Hudson is one of the two eponymous protagonists of the LGBTQ-themed book series The Lady Holmes and Hudson Investigations by Mattea Orr. Recently widowed Katherine Hudson becomes a maid for Lady Violet Holmes, mother to the seven year Sherlock. As she is pressed into also acting as Violet's assistant in sleuthing, Katherine comes to develop romantic feelings toward her employer.

=== Other media ===
In the 1923 play The Return of Sherlock Holmes, Mrs. Hudson was portrayed by Esmé Hubbard. Mrs. Hudson was played by Paddy Edwards in the 1965 musical Baker Street, though the character does not perform any of the songs in the musical. Julia Sutton played Mrs. Hudson in the original 1988 production of Sherlock Holmes: The Musical, in which one song is performed solely by Mrs. Hudson (in which she laments the misfortunes in her life), and another song is performed by Mrs. Hudson and others.

She appears briefly in the Mythos Software video games The Lost Files of Sherlock Holmes: The Case of the Serrated Scalpel (voiced by Diana Montano) and The Lost Files of Sherlock Holmes: The Case of the Rose Tattoo (voiced by Coralie Persee). A puzzle game titled Mrs. Hudson was released by Everett Kaser Software. Mrs. Hudson also appears in the Frogwares video games Sherlock Holmes: Crimes & Punishments (2014) and Sherlock Holmes: The Devil's Daughter (2016).

== Actors who have played Mrs. Hudson ==
=== Radio and audio dramas ===
Name	Title	Date	Type
Mary Gordon	The New Adventures of Sherlock Holmes	1945–1946	Radio (Mutual)
Dora Gregory	The Adventure of the Speckled Band	1945	BBC Home Service
Susan Richards	The Adventure of the Speckled Band	1948	BBC Home Service
Elizabeth Maude	The Adventures of Sherlock Holmes – "The Dying Detective", "The Second Stain"	1954	BBC Light Programme
Elsa Palmer	The Sign of Four	1959	BBC Light Programme
Kathleen Helme	Sherlock Holmes – "The Naval Treaty"	1960	BBC Light Programme
Penelope Lee	Sherlock Holmes – "The Valley of Fear"	1960	BBC Home Service
Gudrun Ure	Sherlock Holmes – "The Empty House"	1961	BBC Light Programme
Beryl Calder	Sherlock Holmes – "Thor Bridge"	1962	BBC Light Programme
Barbara Mitchell	Sherlock Holmes (4 stories)	1962–1967	BBC radio
Grizelda Hervey	Sherlock Holmes – "The Sign of the Four"	1963	BBC Home Service
Janet Morrison	Sherlock Holmes (7 stories)	1964–1969	BBC radio
Cecile Chevreau	Sherlock Holmes – "Charles Augustus Milverton"	1970	LP record audio drama
Barbara Atkinson	The Hound of the Baskervilles	1988	BBC Radio 4
Anna Cropper	Sherlock Holmes – A Study in Scarlet, The Sign of the Four	1989	BBC Radio 4
Mary Allen	Sherlock Holmes – "A Scandal in Bohemia", "The Noble Bachelor"	1990–1991	BBC Radio 4
Joan Matheson	Sherlock Holmes (7 stories)	1992–1995	BBC Radio 4
Judi Dench	Sherlock Holmes – The Hound of the Baskervilles	1998	BBC Radio 4
Lee Paasch	The Further Adventures of Sherlock Holmes	1998–2013	Radio (Imagination Theatre)
Lee Paasch	The Classic Adventures of Sherlock Holmes	2005–2012	Radio (Imagination Theatre)
June Whitfield	The Newly Discovered Casebook of Sherlock Holmes	1999	BBC Radio 2
Beth Chalmers	Sherlock Holmes	2011–2012	Audio dramas (Big Finish Productions)
Moira Quirk	The Hound of the Baskervilles	2014	Audio drama (L.A. Theatre Works)
Patricia Hodge	Mrs Hudson's Radio Show	2018	BBC Radio 4
Ellen McLain	The Further Adventures of Sherlock Holmes	2019–present	Radio (Imagination Theatre)
Marta da Silva	Sherlock & Co.	2023-present	Audio drama (Goalhanger Podcasts)

=== Stage plays ===
Name	Title	Date	Type
Esmé Hubbard	The Return of Sherlock Holmes	1923	Stage play
Paddy Edwards	Baker Street	1965	Stage musical
Toni Lamond	Sherlock's Last Case	1984–1985	Stage play
Julia Sutton	Sherlock Holmes: The Musical	1989	Stage musical
Jane Pfitsch	Baskerville: A Sherlock Holmes Mystery	2015	Stage play

=== Television and DTV films ===
Name	Title	Date	Type
Violet Besson	The Three Garridebs	1937	Television play for NBC (American)
Marguerite Young	Doctor Watson and the Darkwater Hall Mystery	1974	Television film (British)
Marjorie Bennett	Sherlock Holmes in New York	1976	Television film (American)
Rina Zelyonaya	The Adventures of Sherlock Holmes and Dr. Watson	1979–1986	TV film series (USSR)
Lynn Rainbow	Sherlock Holmes and the Sign of Four	1983	Animated television film (Australian)
Jenny Laird	The Masks of Death	1984	Television film (British)
Margaret John	Sherlock Holmes and the Leading Lady	1991	Television films
Margaret John	Incident at Victoria Falls	1992	Television films
Kathleen McAuliffe	The Royal Scandal	2001	Television films (Canadian)
Kathleen McAuliffe	The Case of the Whitechapel Vampire	2002	Television films (Canadian)
Anne Carroll	Sherlock Holmes and the Case of the Silk Stocking	2004	Television film (British)
Catriona McDonald	Sherlock Holmes	2010	DTV film (American)
Emily Gray	Case Closed: The Phantom of Baker Street	2010	Japanese anime film (English dub, released on DVD)

=== Television series ===
Name	Title	Date	Type
Iris Vandeleur	Sherlock Holmes	1951	TV series (British)
Mary Holder	Sherlock Holmes – "The Speckled Band"	1964	TV episode (British)
Enid Lindsey	Sherlock Holmes	1965	TV series (British)
Grace Arnold	Sir Arthur Conan Doyle's Sherlock Holmes	1968	TV series (British)
Pat Keen	The Baker Street Boys	1983	TV series (British)
Rosalie Williams	Sherlock Holmes	1984–1994	TV series (British)
Yōko Asagami	Sherlock Hound	1984–1985	TV animated series (Italian-Japanese) (Japanese version)
Patricia Parris	Sherlock Hound	1984–1985	TV animated series (Italian-Japanese) (English dub)
Cristina Grado	Sherlock Hound	1984–1985	TV animated series (Italian-Japanese) (Italian dub)
Bunty Webb	Alfred Hitchcock Presents – "My Dear Watson"	1989	TV episode (American)
Jan Hooks	Saturday Night Live – "Sherlock Holmes' Birthday Party"	1991	TV sketch (American)
Una Stubbs	Sherlock	2010–2017	TV series (British)
Candis Cayne	Elementary	2013–2014	TV series (American)
Ingeborga Dapkūnaitė	Sherlock Holmes	2013	TV series (Russian)
Keiko Horiuchi	Sherlock Holmes	2014–2015	TV series (Japanese)
Ran Itō	Miss Sherlock	2018	TV series (Japanese)
Rino Katase	Sherlock: Untold Stories	2019	TV series (Japanese)
Junichi Suwabe	Case File nº221: Kabukicho	2019–2020	TV anime series (Japanese) (Japanese version)
David Wald	Case File nº221: Kabukicho	2019–2020	TV anime series (Japanese) (English dub)
Kana Asumi	Moriarty the Patriot	2020–2021	TV anime series (Japanese)
Denise Black	The Irregulars	2021	TV series (British)
Mary O'Driscoll	Sherlock & Daughter	2025	TV series (American)

=== Theatrical films ===
Name	Title	Date	Type
Madame d'Esterre	20 short films	1921–1923	Stoll series silent films (British)
Madame d'Esterre	The Hound of the Baskervilles	1921	Stoll series silent films (British)
Madame d'Esterre	The Sign of the Four	1923	Stoll series silent films (British)
Minnie Rayner	The Sleeping Cardinal	1931	1931–1937 film series (British)
Minnie Rayner	The Missing Rembrandt	1932	1931–1937 film series (British)
Minnie Rayner	The Triumph of Sherlock Holmes	1935	1931–1937 film series (British)
Minnie Rayner	Silver Blaze	1937	1931–1937 film series (British)
Marie Ault	The Speckled Band	1931	British film
Clare Greet	The Sign of Four	1932	1931–1937 film series (British)
Tempe Pigott	A Study in Scarlet	1933	American film
Mary Gordon	The Hound of the Baskervilles	1939	1939–1946 film series (USA)
Mary Gordon	The Adventures of Sherlock Holmes	1939	1939–1946 film series (USA)
Mary Gordon	Sherlock Holmes and the Voice of Terror	1942	1939–1946 film series (USA)
Mary Gordon	Sherlock Holmes and the Secret Weapon	1942	1939–1946 film series (USA)
Mary Gordon	Sherlock Holmes in Washington	1943	1939–1946 film series (USA)
Mary Gordon	Sherlock Holmes Faces Death	1943	1939–1946 film series (USA)
Mary Gordon	The Spider Woman	1944	1939–1946 film series (USA)
Mary Gordon	The Pearl of Death	1944	1939–1946 film series (USA)
Mary Gordon	The Woman in Green	1945	1939–1946 film series (USA)
Mary Gordon	Dressed to Kill	1946	1939–1946 film series (USA)
E. Schultze-Westrum	Sherlock Holmes and the Deadly Necklace	1962	West German-French-Italian film
Barbara Leake	A Study in Terror	1965	British film
Irene Handl	The Private Life of Sherlock Holmes	1970	American film
Alison Leggatt	The Seven-Per-Cent Solution	1976	American film
Betty Woolfe	Murder by Decree	1979	British-Canadian film
Pat Keen	Without a Clue	1988	British film
Kei Hayami	Case Closed: The Phantom of Baker Street	2002	Japanese anime film (Japanese version)
Geraldine James	Sherlock Holmes	2009	British–American films
Geraldine James	Sherlock Holmes: A Game of Shadows	2011	British–American films
Sarah Crowden	Mr. Holmes	2015	British–American film
Kelly Macdonald	Holmes & Watson	2018	American film

=== Video games ===
Name	Title	Date	Type
Diana Montano	The Lost Files of Sherlock Holmes: The Case of the Serrated Scalpel	1992	Voice role
Coralie Persee	The Lost Files of Sherlock Holmes: The Case of the Rose Tattoo	1996	Voice role; digitized sprites based on a different actor
Stella Gonet	Sherlock Holmes: Crimes & Punishments	2014	Sherlock Holmes series; voice role
Unknown actor	Sherlock Holmes: The Devil's Daughter	2016	Sherlock Holmes series; voice role
