= Minor Sherlock Holmes characters =

This article describes minor characters from the Sherlock Holmes stories by Sir Arthur Conan Doyle, and from non-canonical derived works. The list excludes the titular character as well as Dr. Watson, Professor Moriarty, Inspector Lestrade, Mycroft Holmes, Mrs. Hudson, Irene Adler, Colonel Moran, the Baker Street Irregulars, and characters not significant enough to mention.

== Stamford ==
Stamford is an acquaintance of Watson and Holmes. Appearing in the first story, A Study in Scarlet, he introduces the characters to each other.

=== Film and television ===
- Gennadi Bogachyov played Stamford in the 1979 Soviet film, Sherlock Holmes and Dr. Watson
- In the BBC series Sherlock, Mark Stamford is portrayed by David Nellist.

=== Audio ===
- Stamford was portrayed by Paul Downing in the first two episodes of the radio series, Sherlock Holmes (1989).
- In the podcast series Sherlock & Co. Mike "Stammo" Stamford is voiced by Adam Jarrell, the director of the podcast, a recurring character and friend of John.

== Inspectors ==
=== Inspector Baynes ===
Inspector Baynes of the Surrey Constabulary appears in the two-part story "The Adventure of Wisteria Lodge", subtitled (i) "The Singular Experience of Mr John Scott Eccles", and (ii) "The Tiger of San Pedro". He is the only official policeman in the books to have ever matched Sherlock Holmes in his investigative skills. He is described as a very heavy man with a "puffy" face, but very intelligent eyes. In this story, the reader finds that, despite working along different lines, Holmes and Baynes both arrive at the correct conclusion and solve the case at the same time. In fact, Baynes had misled Holmes, as he used a method similar to one that Holmes often used when he arrested the wrong man and provided inaccurate information to the press, to lull the true criminal into a false sense of security. Holmes congratulated Baynes, and believed that he would go far.

==== Film and television ====
- In the 1988 Granada Television adaptation of "The Adventure of Wisteria Lodge" Inspector Baynes is portrayed by Freddie Jones.
- In the Japanese puppetry television series Sherlock Holmes (2014–2015), Baynes is a pupil of Beeton School and a classmate and rival of Holmes. Baynes provokes Holmes to investigate the disappearance of two pupils, Garcia and Henderson. Afterwards, he provokes Holmes by posting a message including stick figures of dancing men. Yōsuke Asari voices him.

==== Radio ====
- In the podcast series Sherlock & Co. Baynes is voiced by Freddie Cohen.

==== Video games ====
- A version of Inspector Baynes appears in the video game The Testament of Sherlock Holmes (2012), in which Baynes is employed by Scotland Yard.

=== Inspector Bradstreet ===
Inspector Bradstreet is a detective who appears in three short stories: "The Man with the Twisted Lip", "The Adventure of the Blue Carbuncle" and "The Adventure of the Engineer's Thumb". Doyle described him as "a tall, stout official... in a peaked cap and frogged jacket". Sidney Paget's illustrations for the Strand Magazine depict him with a full beard. Beyond this little is revealed about him in the canon.

Bradstreet originally served in Scotland Yard's E (Holborn) Division which associates him with the Bow Street Runners, a forerunner of Scotland Yard. He claims to have been in the force since 1862 ("The Man with the Twisted Lip") but in June 1889 Dr Watson writes he is in B (Chelsea) Division to oversee "The Adventure of the Blue Carbuncle". According to Sherlockian author Jack Tracy, B Division was "one of the twenty-two administrative divisions of the Metropolitan Police Force. Its 5.17 square miles include parts of south Kensington and the south-western section of West-minister [sic]".

In "The Adventure of the Engineer's Thumb", he accompanied Holmes to Eyford, a village in Berkshire. According to Jack Tracy's The Encyclopaedia Sherlockiana, he was "assigned most likely to the central headquarters staff." Bradstreet is not a martinet; in "The Man with the Twisted Lip" he could have prosecuted the false beggar, but chose to overlook this action to spare Neville St Clair the shaming of his wife and children.

He is also featured in M. J. Trow's series The Adventures of Inspector Lestrade.

==== Film and television ====
- Bradstreet was portrayed by Victor Brooks in the 1965 television adaptation of the same story in the television series Sherlock Holmes.
- Bradstreet appears four times in Granada Television's The Adventures of Sherlock Holmes: "The Blue Carbuncle", "The Man with the Twisted Lip", "The Adventure of the Bruce-Partington Plans" (substituting for Inspector Lestrade, as Colin Jeavons was unavailable), and a cameo appearance in "The Adventure of the Mazarin Stone". Initially he was played by Brian Miller as a blustering, pompous plodder, then later as much more competent by Denis Lill.

==== Radio ====
- Herbert Rawlinson played Bradstreet in a radio adaptation of "The Man with the Twisted Lip" (1946) in The New Adventures of Sherlock Holmes.
- In the 1952–1969 series of Sherlock Holmes BBC radio adaptations, Bradstreet was played by Ronald Baddiley in the 1959 dramatisation of "The Man with the Twisted Lip".
- In the 1989–1998 radio series of BBC Radio Sherlock Holmes adaptations, Bradstreet was played by David Goudge in two episodes in 1991.

=== Inspector Gregson ===
Inspector Tobias Gregson, a Scotland Yard inspector, was first introduced in A Study in Scarlet (1887), and he subsequently appears in ,"The Adventure of the Greek Interpreter" (1893), "The Adventure of Wisteria Lodge" (1908) and "The Adventure of the Red Circle" (1911). Holmes declares him to be "the smartest of the Scotland Yarders," but given Holmes' opinion of the Scotland Yard detectives, this is not sweeping praise. In one of the stories, Watson specifically mentions the callous and cool way in which Gregson behaved.

In his first appearance, Gregson is the polar opposite of Inspector Lestrade. Doyle's visual depiction of them reflects their professional animosity. Gregson is tall, "tow-headed" and has "fat, square hands", in contrast to the shorter Lestrade's dark "ferretlike" (narrow) features.

Of all the Yarders, Gregson comes the closest to meeting Sherlock Holmes on intellectual grounds, but acknowledges Holmes's superior abilities. He admits to Holmes that he feels more confident when he has Holmes' aid in a case. Regrettably, he is bound within the confines of the law he serves, and the delay in getting his assistance turns to tragedy in "The Adventure of the Greek Interpreter". He also has some regrettable human flaws. During A Study in Scarlet, he publicly laughs at Lestrade's incorrect assumptions, even though he is also on the wrong trail.

Unlike Lestrade, Gregson overlooks the little grey areas of the law, and in "The Adventure of the Greek Interpreter" overlooks Holmes's breaking of a window in order to enter a premises. The life of Mycroft Holmes's fellow lodger is saved by this minor criminal act.

Gregson last appears in Doyle's "The Adventure of the Red Circle" in events that happen in 1902 but are not published by Dr. Watson until 1911. In this story, Watson observes that:

Our official detectives may blunder in the matter of intelligence, but never in that of courage. Gregson climbed the stair to arrest this desperate murderer with the same absolutely quiet and businesslike bearing with which he would have ascended the official staircase of Scotland Yard. The Pinkerton man had tried to push past him, but Gregson had firmly elbowed him back. London dangers were the privilege of the London force.

Inspector Gregson has appeared in multiple pastiches written by other authors, including several short stories by Adrian Conan Doyle published in the 1954 collection The Exploits of Sherlock Holmes, and the novel Dust and Shadow (2009) by Lyndsay Faye.

==== Film and television ====
- John Willard played Inspector Gregson in the 1922 silent film Sherlock Holmes.
- In the 1945 film The Woman in Green, Gregson was played by Matthew Boulton.
- George A. Cooper played Inspector Gregson in two episodes of the television series Sherlock Holmes in 1968.
- In the Soviet television film series The Adventures of Sherlock Holmes and Dr. Watson (1979–1986), Inspector Gregson was played by Igor Dmitriev.
- Inspector Gregson was portrayed by Oliver Maguire in the 1985 episode "The Greek Interpreter" in the Granada Television series Sherlock Holmes.
- A character named Captain Gregson of the NYPD appears in the TV series Elementary (2012–2019), portrayed by Aidan Quinn. Originally he was to be called Tobias Gregson, after the character in the stories, but his name was changed to Thomas Gregson.
- Gregson appears in the anime Moriarty the Patriot.
- Gregson is played by Tim Key in the streaming television series The Irregulars.
- In the TV series Watson, Gregson is mentioned as being Watson's main contact at Scotland Yard.

==== Radio ====
- Eric Snowden played Inspector Gregson in the episode "The Strange Case of the Demon Barber" (1946) in the radio series The New Adventures of Sherlock Holmes.
- In the 1952–1969 BBC radio series of Sherlock Holmes adaptations, Michael Turner voiced Gregson in the 1960 dramatisation of "The Greek Interpreter". He was played by Humphrey Morton in "A Study in Scarlet" (1962) and "The Red Circle" (1969). Geoffrey Wincott voiced Inspector Gregson in the 1966 dramatisation of "Wisteria Lodge".
- Frederick Treves voiced Inspector Gregson in the 1974 BBC radio drama "A Study in Scarlet".
- In the BBC Radio Sherlock Holmes series with Clive Merrison as Sherlock Holmes, Inspector Gregson was voiced by John Moffat in A Study in Scarlet (1989), and by Ronald Herdman in "The Greek Interpreter" (1992) and "The Red Circle" (1994).
- In Sherlock Holmes radio dramas on Imagination Theatre, Inspector Gregson is played mainly by John Murray.
- Edward Harrison voiced Inspector Gregson in Sherlock Holmes: The Voice of Treason, an Audible Original 8-hour audio drama released in 2020.
- DI Tom Gregson is portrayed by Ant McGinley in the podcast series Sherlock & Co.. This iteration acts as a former associate-turned-rival to Sherlock before becoming a reluctant friend to the cast.

==== Video games ====
- Inspector Gregson appears in the video game The Lost Files of Sherlock Holmes: The Case of the Serrated Scalpel (1992), and is briefly seen at Scotland Yard in the sequel The Lost Files of Sherlock Holmes: The Case of the Rose Tattoo (1996).
- Gregson appears in two cases in the video game Sherlock Holmes: Consulting Detective Vol. III (1993).
- Tobias Gregson is the main police detective in the game The Great Ace Attorney: Adventures (2015), before being replaced by Gina Lestrade, a pickpocket based on Inspector Lestrade whom Gregson trained in detective work.

=== Inspector Hopkins ===
Inspector Stanley Hopkins is a Scotland Yard detective and a student of Holmes's deductive methods, who attempts to apply them in his own investigations. Holmes, however, is very critical of Hopkins's ability to apply them well, Hopkins sometimes making such mistakes as arresting a man whose notebook was found at a crime scene despite it being physically impossible for the man in question to have killed the victim in the manner that he was discovered; after the real culprit was captured, he learns to be more open-minded in future cases. Hopkins refers several cases to Holmes, all within the South-East areas of England and London, including:

- "The Adventure of the Golden Pince-Nez", set in 1894 in Chatham, Kent
- "The Adventure of Black Peter", in Weald set in 1895
- "The Adventure of the Abbey Grange", in 1897 in Chislehurst

==== Film and television ====
- Teddy Arundell played Inspector Hopkins in eleven 1922 short films in the Sherlock Holmes silent film series by Stoll Pictures.
- H. Wheeler played Hopkins in one 1922 short film.
- In the 1946 film Dressed to Kill, Hopkins was portrayed by Carl Harbord.
- In the television series Sherlock Holmes (1965–1968), the character was played in two 1965 episodes by John Barcroft and one 1968 episode by James Kenney.
- In the Granada Television series Sherlock Holmes, Inspector Hopkins was played by Paul Williamson in "The Abbey Grange" (1986) and by Nigel Planer in "The Golden Pince-Nez" (1994).
- In the first episode of Season Two of Elementary, a "DCI Hopkins" calls Holmes to London from New York, and was played by Tim McMullan
- A female Inspector named Stella Hopkins appears in the episode of Sherlock entitled "The Six Thatchers". While uncertain, it can be presumed that the character drew inspiration from Inspector Hopkins.

==== Radio ====
- In the 1952–1969 series of Sherlock Holmes BBC radio adaptations, Inspector Hopkins was played by Michael Turner in the radio drama "Black Peter" (1961), Hugh Dickson in "The Golden Pince-Nez" and "The Abbey Grange" (both in 1962), and Arnold Peters in another radio version of "Black Peter" (1969).
- Hopkins was voiced by Geoffrey Collins in a 1970 LP record audio drama adaptation of "Black Peter".
- Hopkins was played by Andrew Wincott in three 1993 episodes of the 1989–1998 BBC Radio Sherlock Holmes series.
- In the podcast series Sherlock & Co. Stanley Hopkins is voiced by Rhys Tees.

=== Athelney Jones ===
Inspector Athelney Jones is a Scotland Yard detective who appears in The Sign of the Four. He arrests the entire household of Bartholomew Sholto, including his brother and servants, on suspicion of his murder, but is forced to release all but one of them, much to his own embarrassment.

According to Leslie S. Klinger, several scholars have theorised that Athelney Jones and Peter Jones, the "official police agent" who appears in "The Red-Headed League", are the same person. Peter Jones is similar to Athelney Jones in character, and references the events of The Sign of the Four, remarking of Holmes that "once or twice, as in that business of the Sholto murder and the Agra treasure, he has been more nearly correct than the official force."

Athelney Jones is the primary police inspector of the Sherlock Holmes pastiche novel Moriarty (2014) by Anthony Horowitz.

==== Film and television ====
- Athelney Jones was played by Emrys James in the 1987 Granada adaptation
- The 2001 Hallmark adaptation featured Michel Perron as Jones.
- In the first episode of the seventh season of Elementary, titled "The Further Adventures" (2019), Holmes and Watson work as consulting detectives for Scotland Yard with DCI Athelney Jones, who is portrayed by Tamsin Greig.

==== Radio ====
- Siôn Probert portrayed him in the 1989 radio adaptation of The Sign of the Four in the 1989–1998 BBC Radio series.
- Siôn Probert also played Athelney Jones in two episodes of the BBC radio series The Further Adventures of Sherlock Holmes, "The Singular Inheritance of Miss Gloria Wilson" (2002) and "The Thirteen Watches" (2009).
- In an episode of the American radio series The Further Adventures of Sherlock Holmes titled "The Mystery of Edelweiss Lodge" (2011), Inspector Peter Jones introduces himself as Athelney Jones's brother.
- In the podcast series Sherlock & Co. Jones is voiced by Marc Antolin

=== Inspector MacDonald ===
Inspector Alec MacDonald is a Scotland Yard inspector who appears in the novel The Valley of Fear. He is from Aberdeen, Scotland. Watson states that MacDonald is "a silent, precise man with a dour nature and a hard Aberdonian accent. Twice already in his career had Holmes helped him to attain success". MacDonald respects Holmes, and Holmes calls him "friend MacDonald" and frequently addresses him as "Mr. Mac".

According to Owen Dudley Edwards, Inspector MacDonald may have been inspired by Inspector Mackenzie, a fictional Scottish police detective in E. W. Hornung's A. J. Raffles stories, though the two inspectors are different in character.

Gordon Jackson played Inspector MacDonald in the television film The Masks of Death (1984). He was played by Mark Bonnar in the 1997 radio adaptation of The Valley of Fear in the 1989–1998 BBC Radio series. MacDonald is played by Dennis Bateman and David Natale in the American radio series The Further Adventures of Sherlock Holmes, in which he is a recurring character.

== Billy ==
Billy is Holmes's young page, appearing in the stories The Valley of Fear, "The Problem of Thor Bridge" and "The Mazarin Stone". In the latter, he plays a significant role in helping to arrest the lead villain. He is a more significant character in all three of Doyle's plays featuring Sherlock Holmes, Sherlock Holmes; A Drama in Four Acts, The Stonor Case and The Crown Diamond, and in the spoof The Painful Predicament of Sherlock Holmes written by William Gillette. In 1903 Charlie Chaplin began his career by playing Billy on stage in both the four-act play and Gillette's spoof.

=== Film and television ===
- Billy has appeared in the 1916 film Sherlock Holmes portrayed by Burford Hampden
- In the 1922 film Sherlock Holmes he was played by Jerry Devine
- Terry Kilburn portrayed Billy in the films Sherlock Holmes (1932) and The Adventures of Sherlock Holmes (1939).
- Billy appears in the episode "The Problem of Thor Bridge" in the Granada television series (1991), played by Dean Magri
- In the episode of the TV series Sherlock entitled "The Abominable Bride", Billy makes an appearance played by Adam Greaves-Neal, who previously played an original character named Archie in "The Sign of Three" (though presumably Archie drew some inspiration from Billy).

== Shinwell Johnson ==
Shinwell "Porky" Johnson is a former criminal who acts as informant and occasional muscle for Sherlock Holmes. Watson notes that the nature of his association with Holmes means that Shinwell is only useful in cases that by their nature will not go to court, as he would compromise his connection to Holmes and thus render himself useless as a source if he ever had to testify as part of a case. He appears in "The Adventure of the Illustrious Client" where he protects Kitty from Baron Gruner's henchmen and provides Holmes with insight into how he might go about infiltrating Gruner's house to acquire a certain book.

=== Film and television ===
- In adaptations of The Illustrious Client, he was portrayed by Norman Mitchell for the 1965 BBC series
- Roy Holder portrayed Shinwell in the 1991 installment of the 1984 Granada series Sherlock Holmes
- The fifth season of the TV show Elementary introduced an updated version of the character (played by Nelsan Ellis) as both a former patient of Watson's and ex-convict now attempting to go straight. He became part of a complex sting operation to infiltrate and dismantle his old gang, but after Sherlock and Joan decided to trust him even after learning that he killed one of his old associates in the gang, he was killed before he could complete his assignment.
- Johnson (played by Ritchie Coster) is a main character in the series Watson (2025–2026), in which he leaves behind his criminal past to become an aide at Watson's new clinic. However, he is blackmailed into becoming an agent for Professor Moriarty, under the threat of death to his loved ones, providing Moriarty with gene samples from Watson's work and switching his medication for hallucinogens. Once Moriarty his been killed by the virus he tried to unleash using Watson's work, Shinwell was forgiven for his actions, completed training as a nurse, and has formed a bond with his supervisor Carlin DaCosta.

=== Radio ===
- He is referred to in the BBC radio adaptations of Sherlock Holmes, specifically in an episode of The Further Adventures of Sherlock Holmes, "The Ferrers Documents" (2009), where he appears to carry on with intimidation business. He is played in the episode by Dan Starkey.
- Neville Jason portrayed Shinwell in the 1994 BBC radio dramatisation.

=== Video games ===
- He appears in the Sherlock Holmes: Consulting Detective video game series (1991–1993), in which he is a former criminal and innkeeper.

== Mary Morstan ==
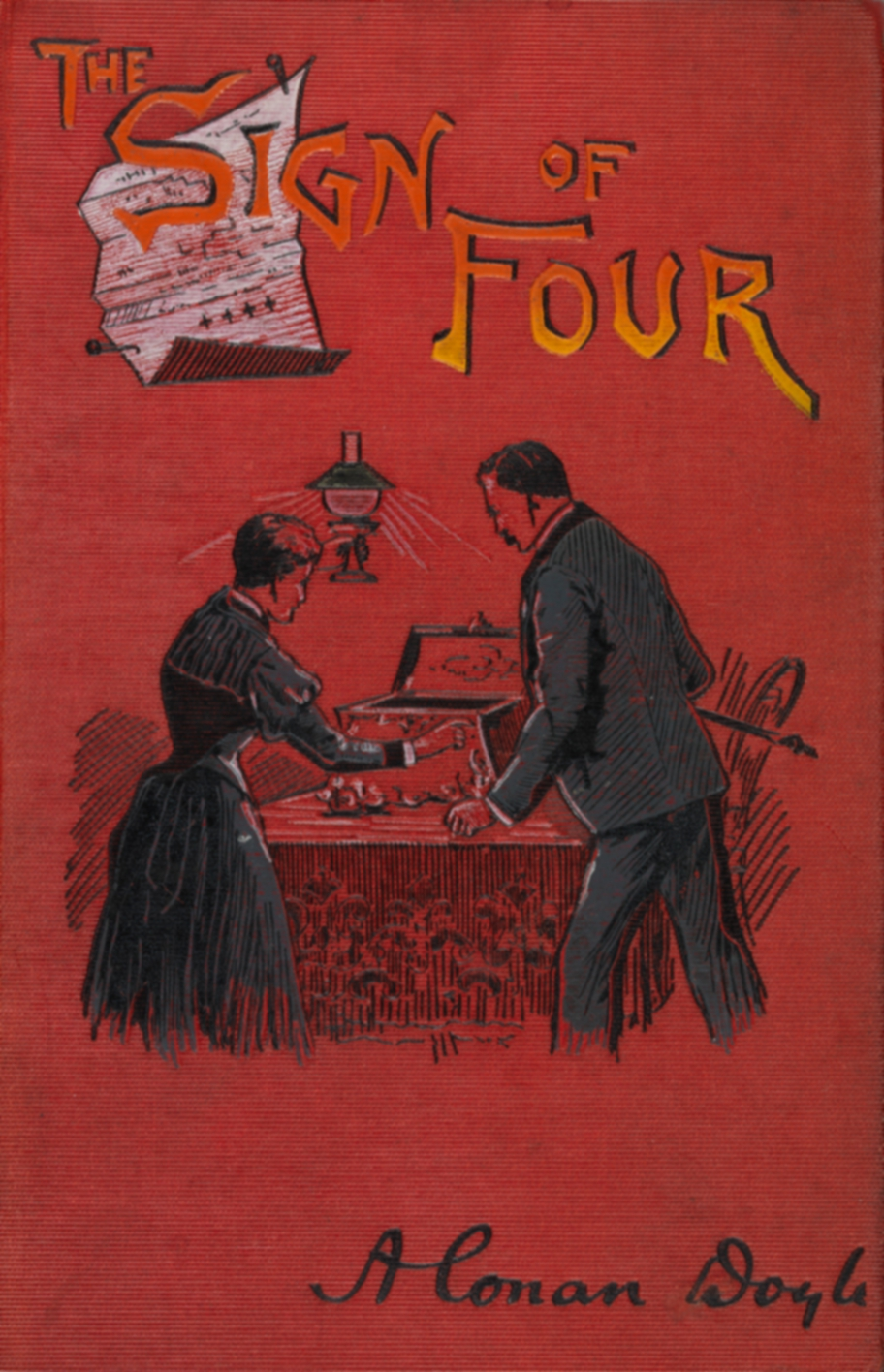
Morstan and Watson depicted on an 1892 edition of The Sign of Four.

Mary Watson (née Morstan) is the wife of Dr. Watson. She is first introduced in The Sign of the Four, where she and Watson tentatively become attracted to each other, but only when the case is resolved is he able to propose to her. She is described as a blonde with pale skin who had been making a living as a governess. She hired Holmes to solve the mystery of her father's disappearance, which led to the mystery of the Agra Treasure. At the end of the story the main treasure is lost – rather to Watson's relief, since if she had been a rich heiress, his proposing to her might have been considered the act of a fortune-hunter. From the entirety of the Agra Treasure, six pearls from a chaplet are in her possession.

Her father, Captain Arthur Morstan, was a senior captain of an Indian regiment and later stationed near the Andaman Islands. He disappeared in 1878 under mysterious circumstances that would later be proven to be related to the mystery, The Sign of the Four. Her mother died sometime before 1878 and she had no other relatives in England, although she was educated there (in accordance with the practice of the time about European children in British-ruled India) until the age of seventeen. Shortly afterwards, her father disappeared and she found work as a governess. Watson and Mary married in 1889.

Mary Morstan is mentioned in passing in "The Adventure of the Crooked Man" and "The Boscombe Valley Mystery", but by the time of "The Adventure of the Empty House" (on Holmes's return) Mary Morstan has died ("my own sad bereavement") and Watson has returned to his former lodgings in Baker Street. Her cause of death is never mentioned.

Leslie S. Klinger writes that there appear to be contradictions regarding Mary Morstan between the stories. According to Morstan in The Sign of the Four, which probably takes place in the summer of 1888, her mother died many years ago and she has no relatives in England. However, in "The Five Orange Pips", which is explicitly dated by Watson in September 1887, Watson is already married, and is again in Baker Street because his wife was "on a visit to her mother's". These discrepancies may be errors, though Klinger suggests they indicate that Watson had a wife who preceded Mary Morstan and died before 1888.

=== Film and television ===
Mary Morstan has been portrayed on film and television by several actresses. In many cases, her role is expanded in new stories.

- Isobel Elsom in the 1913 silent film Sherlock Holmes Solves The Sign of the Four.
- Isla Bevan in the 1932 film The Sign of Four: Sherlock Holmes' Greatest Case featuring Arthur Wontner as Holmes.
- Ann Bell in The Sign of Four episode of the 1965–1968 Sherlock Holmes series featuring Peter Cushing as Holmes and Nigel Stock as Watson.
- Gila von Weitershausen in the 1974 French/German film Das Zeichen der Vier.
- Samantha Eggar in the 1976 film The Seven-Per-Cent Solution.
- Cherie Lunghi in the 1983 film The Sign of Four featuring Ian Richardson as Holmes.
- Yekaterina Zinchenko in the 1983 Soviet film The Treasures of Agra (Priklyucheniya Sherloka Kholmsa I doktora Vatsona: Sokrovishcha Agry).
- Jenny Seagrove in the 1987 television film starring Jeremy Brett.
- Susannah Harker in the 1991 television adaptation of the play The Crucifer of Blood, starring Charlton Heston as Sherlock Holmes. In the play and the telefilm, Morstan is renamed "Irene St. Claire".
- Sophie Lorain in the 2001 film The Sign of Four, with Matt Frewer as Sherlock Holmes and Kenneth Welsh as Dr. Watson. In this version, Mary Morstan becomes engaged to Thaddeus Sholto rather than Dr. Watson.
- Kelly Reilly in Guy Ritchie's 2009 film Sherlock Holmes, starring Robert Downey, Jr. as Sherlock Holmes and Jude Law as Dr. Watson. In the film, Mary is first introduced to Holmes as Watson's fiancée rather than as a client. Reilly reprises the role, marrying Watson in the 2011 film Sherlock Holmes: A Game of Shadows.
- Lexi Wolfe in the 2012–2015 web series The Mary Morstan Mysteries. Lexi would also play the character ("Mrs. Watson") in one episode of the show's parent series, No Place Like Holmes.
- Freda Foh Shen in few episodes of TV adaptation Elementary (2012–2019). In this adaptation, she is the mother of Joan Watson.
- Amanda Abbington in the BBC TV series Sherlock (2010-2017). She is first introduced in "The Empty Hearse" (2014) and later marries John Watson. (See Mary (Morstan) Watson on the series' character list.)
- Anna Ishibashi voices Mary Morstan, a pupil of Archer House in the NHK puppetry television series Sherlock Holmes (2014-2015). In the show, her elder brother Arthur is attacked; she requests Holmes to find an explanation. Watson falls in love with her at first sight and tries to show off his courage. A rival named Jonathan Small sent her a postcard every week before her entrance into Beeton School and writes a song, "You Are My Treasure", for her. Small joins a chorus band formed by Arthur and the Sholto twins, but is betrayed by Arthur who changes the title to "Agra Treasure" and claims it as his own.
- Nao Tōyama voices Mary Morstan in the original anime television series Case File nº221: Kabukicho (2019–2020).
- Rochelle Aytes in the CBS series Watson (2025-2026). Here, she is a successful surgeon who is separated (and later divorced) from Watson, but still works alongside him at the Holmes Clinic in Pittsburgh, where she is an administrator.

=== Radio and stage ===
- In a radio dramatisation of The Sign of the Four that was broadcast on WGY in 1922, Viola Karwowska played Mary Morstan.
- She was played by Norma Varden in "Colonel Warburton's Madness" (1945) in the radio series The New Adventures of Sherlock Holmes.
- Mary Morstan was played by Barbara Mitchell in 1959 serial The Sign of Four which aired on the BBC Light Programme.
- In the 1952–1969 radio series, Elizabeth Morgan played Mary Morstan in the 1963 BBC Home Service radio drama "The Sign of the Four".
- In the play The Crucifer of Blood (1978), which is adapted from The Sign of the Four, Mary Morstan is renamed, Irene St. Claire. Glenn Close played the character in the original 1978 Broadway cast of the play; Susan Hampshire played her in the original 1979 London cast.
- In the 1981 BBC Radio dramatisation of the novel Sherlock Holmes vs. Dracula, the character was played by Theresa Streatfeild.
- In the BBC Radio 4 Sherlock Holmes series, she was played by Moir Leslie in the two-part serial The Sign of the Four (1989), Elizabeth Mansfield in "The Boscombe Valley Mystery" (1990), and Jillie Meers in "The Empty House" (1993).
- In Sherlock Holmes's radio dramas on Imagination Theatre, she has been portrayed by Mary Anne Dorward, Ellen McLain, and Mary Kae Irvin. The character's first appearance was in a 1998 episode of The Further Adventures of Sherlock Holmes, "The Adventure of the Seven Shares" (1998).
- In the Sherlock & Co. podcast series, she was portrayed by Acushla-Tara Kupe.. In this version Mary is a former army nurse from New Zealand, who failed to attend a date with John Watson at the start of the series. She reunites with, and resumes a flirtation with, Watson in "The Sign of the Four".

=== Spin-Off Novels ===
- In the Sherlock Holmes: Classified Dossier novels by Christian Klaver, the series opens with Watson and Mary being turned into vampires by the forces of the now-vampiric Professor Moriarty. While Watson is able to hold on to his own morality with aid from Holmes and Count Dracula- who has become a more moral person through his relationship with Mina Murray- Mary is corrupted by her vampiric status to become Moriarty's agent. Ultimately, Watson is forced to kill Mary by throwing a lamp on her to save Holmes's life, but affirms that in his view the true Mary died when she was transformed.
- Sherlock Holmes vs. Dracula by Loren D. Estleman features Mary being abducted by Count Dracula to serve as a hostage against Holmes and Watson, forcing the two men to pursue Dracula as he tries to escape England, forcing a shipwreck and leaving Dracula to retreat as the sun starts to rise.

== Langdale Pike ==
Langdale Pike is a celebrated gossipmonger whose columns are published in numerous magazines and newspapers (referred to as the "garbage papers" by Watson). He's introduced in "The Adventure of the Three Gables" (1926) in which he helps Holmes learn the name of the woman who led Douglas Maberley to his demise, although he does not actually appear in the story itself and is only referred to by Watson who describes Pike as "strange" and "languid" and states that all of Pike's waking hours are spent "in the bow window of a St. James's Street club". His character has however been expanded on or fleshed out elsewhere.

In William S. Baring-Gould's biography of Sherlock Holmes, Sherlock Holmes of Baker Street (1962), it is claimed that Pike is a college acquaintance of Holmes who encourages a young Holmes to try his hand at acting. Here his real name is given as 'Lord Peter'.

=== Film and television ===
- In the Granada television adaptation starring Jeremy Brett as Holmes, Pike (played by Peter Wyngarde) is apparently an old university friend of Holmes's. Here he claims to be the benevolent counterpart of Charles Augustus Milverton (the eponymous blackmailer of The Adventure of Charles Augustus Milverton), who suppresses more information than he exposes. Though Watson is rather scathing about Pike, Holmes is more sympathetic towards him, suggesting that Pike is isolated, much like Holmes himself.
- In the American television series Elementary, Pike appears in the first episode of the second season as one of Holmes' sources in London; details are not seen as Pike moves quickly when delivering a package to Watson.
- "Langdale" is used as a British Intelligence codename in the first episode of the fourth series of Sherlock, along with "Porlock," the name of another Holmes informer in the original stories.
- In the NHK puppetry television series Sherlock Holmes (2014–2015), Pike is a pupil of Beeton School and assists Holmes in his investigation. He also works as informant and is fast at his job but tight with money. Besides he sells photographs of girls to male pupils. Tomokazu Seki voices him.

=== Radio ===
- In Peter Ling's 1994 radio play of "The Three Gables" for the 1989–1998 BBC Radio series, Pike's real name is said to be Clarence Gable. Here he is also an old school-friend of Holmes's and is nervous of strangers and reluctant to leave his club for this reason.
- In both the 1994 BBC radio play and the 2007 Imagination Theatre radio adaptation of the story, "Langdale Pike" is said to be a pen name derived from the Langdale Pikes. The Imagination Theatre version implies his real name is Lord Peter, as in Baring-Gould's book.
- In the podcast series Sherlock & Co. Langdale is a drag queen and occasional informant for Holmes, they are voiced by Myles Le Blanque.

=== Video games ===
- Langdale Pike also appears in the Sherlock Holmes: Consulting Detective video game series (1991–1993).

=== Spin-Off Novels ===
Pike features in The Spider's Web by Philip Purser-Hallard, where Holmes questions Pike for information about Holmes's current case. When Pike says he's not comfortable talking in front of Watson in case anything ends up in The Strand, Watson is initially put out, but takes Pike's point when Pike notes that he has to protect his sources - servants who may lose their jobs without reference if they were exposed - and tries to avoid identifying people who are victims of scandal who would be judged harshly by society just because of association. While Watson still shows a distaste for Pike's work, he concedes that the man conducts it in a relatively moral fashion.

== Toby ==
Toby is a dog which is used by Sherlock Holmes. He appears in The Sign of the Four and is described by Watson as an "ugly long haired, lop-eared creature, half spaniel and half lurcher, brown and white in colour, with a very clumsy waddling gait." Though used by Holmes, the dog belongs to Mr. Sherman who keeps a menagerie of creatures at No. 3 Pinchin Lane in Lambeth, in London. Toby lives at No. 7 within his house. Holmes states he would "rather have Toby's help than that of the whole detective force in London" and requests the dog by name. Holmes uses a different tracking dog while in Cambridge in "The Adventure of the Missing Three-Quarter".

Toby also featured in the 1978 pastische novel Sherlock Holmes vs Dracula; or, The Adventures of the Sanguinary Count by Loren D. Estleman, when Watson and Holmes called on Toby to track Count Dracula after finding him in a meat-packing district – Dracula's carriage having rolled through blood and old entrails – allowing the two to track Dracula to Watson's house in time to learn that he has abducted Mary Watson.

=== Film and television ===
- In the Holmes-esque The Great Mouse Detective (1986), Toby is a Basset Hound and a permanent resident of 221b Baker Street. He is frequently used by Basil, the eponymous protagonist, as a means of transport and to pick up trails.
- Toby makes an appearance in "The Sign of Four" television special, part of the Granada series, here being a spaniel and border collie cross.
- In the NHK puppetry television series Sherlock Holmes (2014–2015), Toby is kept by Sherman in a shed in Beeton School and assists Holmes in his investigation. In the series, Sherman is a female pupil who loves animals and communicates with them, unlike Mr. Sherman in The Sign of the Four. Though being a pupil of Baker House, she does not live in the house, but in the shed with animals.
- In the BBC series Sherlock, in the first episode of the fourth season titled "The Six Thatchers", Sherlock Holmes requires the services of a bloodhound named Toby.
- In the film The Seven-Per-Cent Solution (film) and the book on which it is based, Toby is a bloodhound that Holmes uses to track Moriarty across Europe.

=== Video games ===
- Toby appears in the video game The Lost Files of Sherlock Holmes: The Case of the Serrated Scalpel (1992) and its sequel The Lost Files of Sherlock Holmes: The Case of the Rose Tattoo (1996).
- In the video game The Testament of Sherlock Holmes (2012) and some of the other games in the Sherlock Holmes video game series, a Basset Hound version of Toby is briefly controlled by the player.

== Wiggins ==
Wiggins is a street urchin in London and head of the Baker Street Irregulars. He has no first name in the stories. He appears in A Study in Scarlet (1887) and The Sign of the Four (1890).

=== Film and television ===
- Wiggins was played by Tony McLaren in the 1968 episodes "The Study in Scarlet" and "The Sign of the Four" of the television series Sherlock Holmes.
- The film The Private Life of Sherlock Holmes (1970), directed by Billy Wilder, features a character called Wiggins (played by Graham Armitage) who is a footman at the Diogenes Club. He delivers a note to Mycroft Holmes (played by Christopher Lee) and receives instructions concerning various items.
- Wiggins was played by Jay Simpson in the 1983 television series The Baker Street Boys.
- Courtney Roper-Knight portrayed Wiggins in the 1987 television film "The Sign of Four", part of the Granada Television series Sherlock Holmes.
- In the 1988 film Without a Clue, Wiggins was played by Matthew Savage.
- The 1989–1991 animated television series Sherlock Holmes in the 22nd Century features a version of the character also named Wiggins, voiced by Viv Leacock.
- In the Hallmark adaptations of The Sign of Four and The Royal Scandal Wiggins was portrayed by Daniel Brochu
- The character, credited as "Bill Wiggins", also appears in the series three finale of Sherlock portrayed by Tom Brooke as a drug user who actually demonstrates the beginning of Sherlock's deductive skills, and later appoints himself a "pupil" of Sherlock's.

=== Radio and stage ===
- Wiggins was voiced on BBC radio by Paul Taylor in the 1959 serial The Sign of Four.
- In the 1952–1969 radio series, Wiggins was played by David Valla in the 1962 dramatisation of "A Study in Scarlet", and by Glyn Dearman in "The Sign of the Four" (1963).
- In the 1965 musical Baker Street, Wiggins was portrayed by Teddy Green.
- In the podcast series Sherlock & Co. Wiggins is still one of Holmes' irregulars, though he is roughly seventeen in his introduction and a young adult in later episodes, and voiced by John Brannoch.

=== Video games ===
- Wiggins appears in the video game The Lost Files of Sherlock Holmes: The Case of the Serrated Scalpel (1992) and was played by Corey Miller in the version of the game released in 1994. Wiggins returns in the sequel The Lost Files of Sherlock Holmes: The Case of the Rose Tattoo (1996), voiced by Paul Vincent Black.
- In the video game Sherlock Holmes: Crimes & Punishments (2014), Wiggins plays a significant role in the last case of the game.

== Non-canonical ==
Some fictional characters associated with Sherlock Holmes are not part of the Conan Doyle canon and were created by other writers.

=== Holmes Family ===
==== Enola Holmes ====
Enola Holmes is the younger sister of Sherlock and Mycroft Holmes. Created by author Nancy Springer, she first appears in the 2006 book The Case of the Missing Marquess, the first in the series of The Enola Holmes Mysteries, adapted into the American films, Enola Holmes (2020), Enola Holmes 2 (2022), and Enola Holmes 3 (2026) where she is portrayed by Millie Bobby Brown. Enola is an independent and rebellious girl who likes to wear trousers while riding her bike. She becomes a "perditorian" or finder of lost things, when her mother runs away and her brother Mycroft tries to send her to boarding school. Using her natural cunning which she and Sherlock had inherited from their mother, she creates multiple disguises on her quest to be reunited with her mother and evade her brothers.

In the films, Enola Holmes is known to break the fourth wall when explaining things to the viewers.

==== Eurus Holmes ====
Eurus Holmes, Mycroft and Sherlock's sister, is the main antagonist in the last episode of the fourth series, "The Final Problem" of the BBC Sherlock. Extremely intelligent but unfeeling, she is incarcerated in a maximum security psychiatric facility. The third-series episode "His Last Vow" series hinted at a third Holmes sibling before Eurus's existence was confirmed in the second episode of the fourth series, "The Lying Detective".

==== Morland Holmes ====
Morland Holmes is the influential businessman and father of Sherlock and Mycroft, played by John Noble in the TV adaptation Elementary. According to Sherlock, Morland Holmes doesn't care about his sons, and only does what he does out of a sense of familial obligations. Sherlock says he is a serial absentee, and that he has been so since Sherlock was a boy. He sent Sherlock to boarding school when he was eight years old.

==== Raffles Holmes ====
Raffles Holmes, the son of Sherlock Holmes, is a fictional character in the 1906 collection of short stories Raffles Holmes and Company by John Kendrick Bangs. He is described as the son of Sherlock Holmes by Marjorie Raffles, the daughter of gentleman thief A. J. Raffles.

Wold Newton family theorist Win Scott Eckert devised an explanation in his Original Wold Newton Universe Crossover Chronology to reconcile the existence of Raffles Holmes with canonical information about Sherlock Holmes and A.J. Raffles, which fellow Wold Newton speculator Brad Mengel incorporated into his essay "Watching the Detectives." According to the theory, Holmes married Marjorie in 1883, and she died giving birth to Raffles later that year. Since Raffles and Holmes are contemporaries, it has been suggested that Marjorie was actually Raffles' sister.

Eckert further proposed in his Crossover Chronology that (1) Raffles Holmes was the same character as the "lovely, lost son" of Sherlock Holmes referred to in Laurie R. King's Mary Russell novels, and (2) Raffles Holmes was the father of Creighton Holmes, who is featured in the collection of short stories The Adventures of Creighton Holmes by Ned Hubbell.

Mengel's online essay was revised for publication in the Eckert-edited Myths for the Modern Age: Philip José Farmer's Wold Newton Universe (MonkeyBrain Books, 2005), a collection of Wold Newton essays by Farmer and several other "post-Farmerian" contributors, authorised by Farmer as an extension of his Wold Newton mythos. He does not appear or is ever mentioned in any of the original stories of Sherlock Holmes and is not a creation of Doyle.

==== Sherrinford Holmes ====
Sherrinford Holmes is a proposed elder brother of Sherlock Holmes and Mycroft Holmes. His name is taken from early notes as one of those considered by Arthur Conan Doyle for his detective hero before settling on "Sherlock Holmes". The name is used of Holmes by Stamford in the 1954 radio show 'Dr Watson Meets Sherlock Holmes' as he attempts to remember Holmes' first name.

He was first proposed by William S. Baring-Gould who wrote in his fictional biography Sherlock Holmes of Baker Street (1962) that Sherrinford was the eldest brother of Sherlock Holmes. Holmes once stated that his family were country squires, which means that the eldest brother would have to stay to manage the estate. If Mycroft were the eldest, he could not play the role he does in four stories of the Sherlock Holmes canon, so Sherrinford frees them both. This position is strengthened by the fact that Mycroft's general position as a senior civil servant was a common choice among the younger sons of the gentry.

The character (as "Sherringford") appears along with his brothers in the Virgin New Adventures Doctor Who novel All-Consuming Fire by Andy Lane, where he is revealed to be the member of a cult worshiping an alien telepathic slug that is mutating him and his followers into an insect-like form; the novel culminates with Holmes being forced to shoot his brother to save Watson.

He also appears, accused of a murder that Sherlock must find him innocent of, in the Call of Cthulhu roleplaying game adventure The Yorkshire Horrors. Sherrinford also appears in the Italian comic series Storie da Altrove (a spin-off of Martin Mystère) as the eldest brother, born nine years before him, of Sherlock himself.

In the BBC adaptation Sherlock, the existence of a third Holmes sibling was established in the series three episode "His Last Vow", when Mycroft stated he wasn't prone to brotherly compassion, and told someone that they "knew what happened to the other one". However, at this point it was assumed that Mycroft was speaking about a third brother and not a sister. The third Holmes brother has been in the Sherlock Holmes mythos for a long time though in varying degrees of canon depending on the source. This character's name is Sherrinford Holmes, the same name as the facility in which Eurus was imprisoned.

In the manga Moriarty the Patriot, Mycroft states that Maximilien Robespierre was actually the cover identity of his ancestor, British agent provocateur Sherrinford Holmes.

==== Sigerson Holmes ====
The film The Adventure of Sherlock Holmes' Smarter Brother has as its protagonist Sigerson Holmes, whom Sherlock (a minor character) identifies as a brother of himself and Mycroft.

The name "Sigerson" is an alias mentioned in passing in a Conan Doyle story as an alias Sherlock used while posing as an explorer.

"Siger Holmes" is also the name given Sherlock's father in Darlene A. Cysper's novel The Crack In The Lens. In her following The Consulting Detective trilogy, Siger disowns Sherlock over his choice not to join the family business and use his gifts to become a forensic investigator. This would explain Holmes's later use(especially during the Great Hiatus) of the alias (Siger's Son).

==== Arabel Holmes ====
The Podcast, Sherlock and Co, introduced Arabel Holmes in their 2026 adaption of The Adventure of the Greek Interpreter.

=== Watson Family ===
==== Amelia Watson ====
The adventures of Amelia Watson, the second wife of Dr. John Watson, are chronicled in a series of short stories and novels by Michael Mallory. The character is based upon the enigmatic reference to Watson having left Holmes in 1902 for a wife, a reference that appears in the canonical story The Adventure of the Blanched Soldier, although the woman in the story is never named or identified nor ever mentioned again in the canon.

==== Carol Watson ====
Mother to John in Sherlock & Co. Voiced by Leigh McDonald.

=== Auguste Lupa ===
Auguste Lupa is the son of Sherlock Holmes and Irene Adler. He appears in two pastiche novels by author John Lescroart, Son of Holmes (1986) and Rasputin's Revenge (1987). Lupa, a secret agent during the First World War, is strongly implied to be the younger version of fictional detective Nero Wolfe in the mystery series by Rex Stout.

=== Mary Russell ===
Mary Russell is a fictional character in a book series by Laurie R. King, focusing on the adventures of Russell and her mentor and, later, husband, an aging Sherlock Holmes.

=== Joanna Blalock ===
Joanna Blalock is a fictional character in a book series by Leonard Goldberg, in which Joanna is reputed (and later confirmed) to be the daughter of Sherlock Holmes. Irene Adler died giving birth to her in the early 1890s, and Holmes gave her up for adoption. By the outbreak of World War I she is a widowed nurse with a young son, but has the same gift for deductive reasoning as her father, and joins Dr. John Watson, Jr. in a series of mystery adventures, which Dr. Watson Sr. narrates. She and John Jr. marry at the end of the first story. Both she and her husband believe Holmes to be deceased at this time, though canon stories imply that he is working undercover for Britain's war efforts. It is not confirmed whether Dr. Watson, Sr. knows this.

=== Amelia Rojas ===
Amelia Rojas is the daughter of Sherlock Holmes and Native American inventor Lucia "Little Dove" Rojas. She appears in the television series Sherlock and Daughter.

=== Mariana Ametxazurra ===
Mariana Ametxazurra is an employee for "Hudsons" an estate agent that is used to modernise the role of Mrs. Hudson in Sherlock & Co. Throughout the earlier episodes Sherlock does erroneously call Mariana, "Mrs. Hudson" as a nod to the original character. Mariana leaves her job to work for "Sherlock & Co." and she lives and operates her side of the business in downstairs flat of 221B. She is voiced by Marta da Silva

=== Lily Lestrade ===
Lily Lestrade is the niece of Inspector Lestrade. Jasmine Kerr voices her in Sherlock & Co.
