= The Dying Detective =

The Dying Detective may refer to:

- "The Adventure of the Dying Detective", in some editions simply titled "The Dying Detective", one of the 56 Sherlock Holmes short stories
- The Dying Detective (film), a 1921 short film directed by Maurice Elvey based on the short story
