= Baker Street Irregulars =

Fictional characters in Sherlock Holmes stories

- Sherlock Holmes character
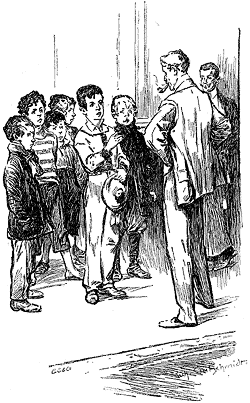
- Sherlock meets the Irregulars in A Study in Scarlet, as illustrated by Richard Gutschmidt
- First appearance: A Study in Scarlet (1887)
- Last appearance: "The Adventure of the Crooked Man" (1893)
- Created by: Arthur Conan Doyle

In-universe information
- Nationality: British

The Baker Street Irregulars are fictional characters who appear in three Sherlock Holmes stories, specifically two novels and one short story, by Arthur Conan Doyle. They are street boys who are employed by Holmes as intelligence agents. The name has subsequently been adopted by other organizations, most notably a prestigious and exclusive literary society founded in the United States by Christopher Morley in 1934.

== Fictional profile ==
The original Baker Street Irregulars are fictional characters in the Sherlock Holmes stories of Arthur Conan Doyle. The group of street urchins is led by a boy called Wiggins. They run errands and track down information for Holmes. According to Holmes, they are able to "go everywhere and hear everything". Holmes also says that they "are as sharp as needles, too; all they want is organisation." In The Sign of the Four, which takes place in 1888, it is shown that Holmes pays them each a shilling per day (equivalent to £6 in 2025), and Holmes offers a guinea prize (equivalent to £118 in 2025) as a reward for the one who locates the steam launch that he wants them to find.

The group appears in the first Sherlock Holmes story, the novel A Study in Scarlet (1887), which is set in 1881. When Watson meets the group, he describes them as "half a dozen of the dirtiest and most ragged street Arabs that ever I clapped eyes on". Holmes introduces them as "the Baker Street division of the detective police force". The group enters 221B Baker Street together, but since they upset Holmes's landlady (who is unnamed in this story but later named Mrs. Hudson), Holmes tells them that in future, only their leader Wiggins should report to him. He pays them each a shilling to track down a certain cabman. They find the cabman, Jefferson Hope, successfully. Wiggins brings him to 221B Baker Street, where the cabman is apprehended by Holmes.

They also appear in the next novel, The Sign of the Four (1890), set in 1888, in which one of the chapters is titled "The Baker Street Irregulars". In this story, Holmes describes them as "the unofficial force — the Baker Street irregulars". As in A Study in Scarlet, the group enters 221B Baker Street together and Holmes instructs them to only have Wiggins report to him in future. Wiggins receives three shillings and sixpence (which he calls "Three bob and a tanner") from Holmes for expenses in addition to his regular wage. Holmes directs the Baker Street Irregulars to search for a steam launch called the Aurora. However, they do not succeed and Holmes ultimately joins the search by disguising himself as a sailor. Though approximately seven years have passed since A Study in Scarlet, Wiggins is still the leader of the Baker Street Irregulars. He is described as being taller and older than the others, and has an "air of lounging superiority".

One of the group appears in the short story "The Adventure of the Crooked Man" (1893). In the story, Holmes has a member of the group, named Simpson, watch Henry Wood. As Holmes says, "I have one of my Baker Street boys mounting guard over him who would stick to him like a burr, go where he might". Simpson, whom Watson describes as "a small street Arab", briefly appears in the story to report to Holmes.

Though not one of the Baker Street Irregulars, a similar character named Cartwright appears in The Hound of the Baskervilles (1902). Cartwright, who works in a district messenger office, secretly runs errands for Holmes on the moor and keeps him supplied while disguised as a country boy. At one point Watson sees the disguised Cartwright running errands, and describes him as "a small urchin" and a "ragged uncouth figure". Cartwright is described as a "lad of fourteen" in the novel. Another similar character, a pageboy named Billy, assists Holmes in "The Adventure of the Mazarin Stone".

According to Daniel Smith in his book The Sherlock Holmes Companion, Holmes was skilled at developing a network of agents who could assist him in any situation, and this network included multiple "outsider" figures such as the Baker Street Irregulars as well as Cartwright, Billy, and former criminal Shinwell Johnson. Smith wrote that this shows that Holmes "realised the value of reliable assistants and was humble enough to look for them in places where others of his status might have never deigned to tread".

== Adaptations ==
=== Television and film ===
- A BBC television series starring the Irregulars titled The Baker Street Boys aired in 1983.
- In the manga series Case Closed (serialized since 1994) which is heavily inspired by the Sherlock Holmes canon the main character Conan Edogawa is the leader of a detective club consisting of himself and three (later four) of his first grade classmates, the "Detective Boys" (少年探偵団 Shōnen Tantei-dan), who quickly develop into this adaptation's version of the Irregulars.
- The Baker Street Irregulars appear in the 1988 film Without a Clue and work for Dr. Watson (Ben Kingsley). There is a running gag in the film whereby they pick the pocket watches of everyone they meet.
- In the animated sci-fi television series Sherlock Holmes in the 22nd Century (1999–2001), a trio of children aid Holmes as the new Baker Street Irregulars, and are even led by a boy named Wiggins.
- A BBC television film titled Sherlock Holmes and the Baker Street Irregulars aired in 2007.
- The modern-day series Sherlock re-imagines the Irregulars as a "Homeless Network" devised of the destitute of London, rather than specifically homeless boys. They do however specifically name one of Sherlock's future informers Billy (who attempts to use the nickname 'The Wig').
- In the modern-day adaptation Elementary (set in New York), the "Irregulars" are an assortment of experienced adults in certain fields that Holmes calls on for insight when his own knowledge of a subject proves inadequate to the current case. Demonstrated Irregulars include a meteorologist, a mathematician, an expert in Greek literature, and a man with a particularly keen sense of smell.
- At the conclusion of the 2011 film Sherlock Holmes: A Game of Shadows, two of the Irregulars can be seen seated attending the funeral service for Holmes following his encounter with Professor Moriarty at the Reichenbach Falls.
- In 2021 Netflix released The Irregulars, in which the group solve supernatural crimes while Holmes and Watson take all the credit.
- Upcoming animated series "Baker Street Four" based on French comic book series coproduced by French broadcaster Canal+ and German broadcaster ARD.
- In the 2026 Amazon Prime Video series Young Sherlock, the Irregular are a network of street urchins in Istanbul used by an ally of Holmes and also by Holmes's father.

=== Radio and audio dramas ===
- In "The Adventure of the Innocent Murderess", a 1947 broadcast of The New Adventures of Sherlock Holmes starring Tom Conway and Nigel Bruce, the character "Charlie" is a member of the Baker Street Irregulars paid 5 shillings for tips leading to the solution of the crime.
- Four actors played the Baker Street Irregulars in a 1963 BBC radio adaptation of The Sign of the Four in the 1952–1969 radio series of Sherlock Holmes adaptations, with another actor, Glyn Dearman, playing Wiggins.
- In "The Adventure of the Irregular Client", a 2013 episode of the American radio series The Further Adventures of Sherlock Holmes, Holmes's client is a former member of the Baker Street Irregulars.
- A member of the Baker Street Irregulars appears in the Audible audio drama Sherlock Holmes: The Voice of Treason (2020).

=== Stage ===
- Wiggins and the Irregulars appeared in the 1965 musical Baker Street. In the musical, they perform the songs "Leave It To Us, Guv" and "Roof Space".
- The Irregulars perform the song "Anything You Want To Know" in the 1989 musical Sherlock Holmes: The Musical. They also perform three other songs alongside other characters.

=== Video games ===
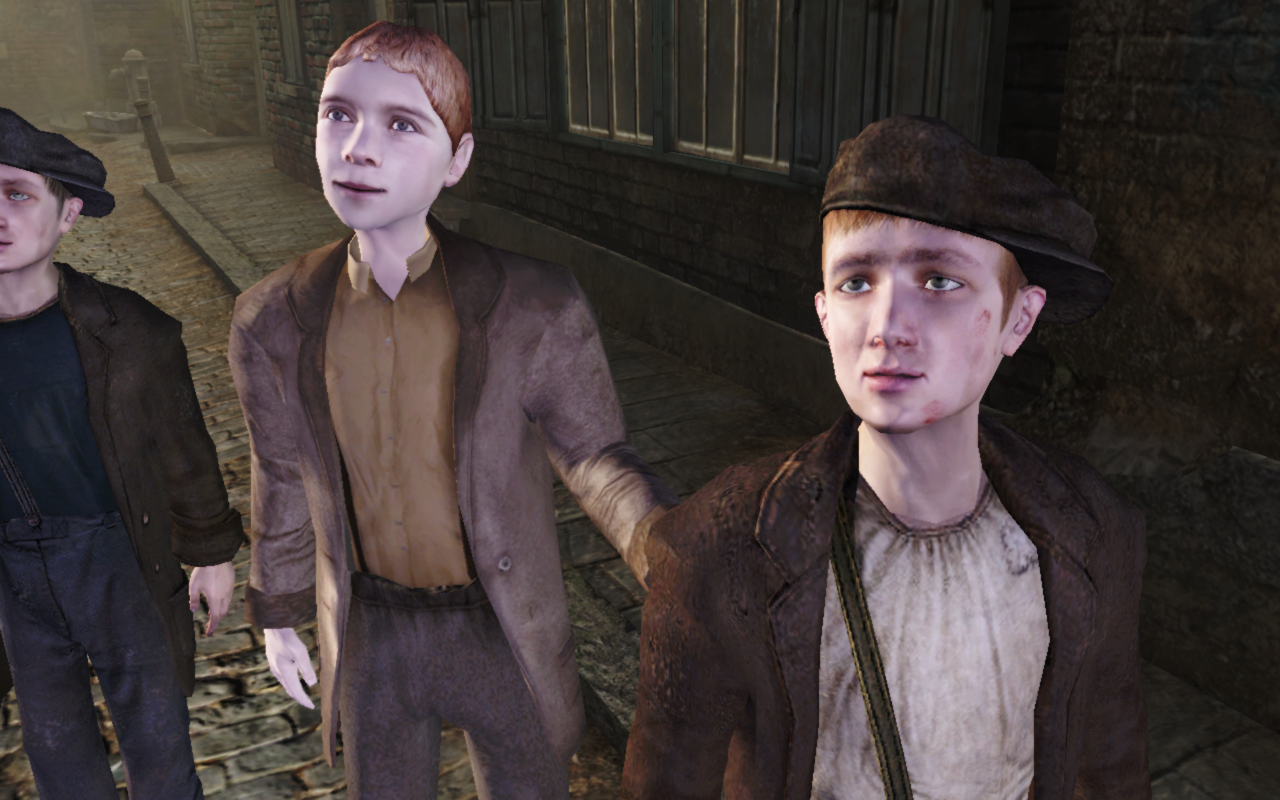
The Irregulars as pictured in Sherlock Holmes Versus Jack the Ripper.

- In the video game Sherlock Holmes: Consulting Detective and its two sequels (1991–1993), adapted from the board game of the same name, the Irregulars can be directed by the player to visit people and locations.
- Wiggins and the Irregulars assist Holmes in the 1992 video game The Lost Files of Sherlock Holmes: The Case of the Serrated Scalpel and its sequel The Lost Files of Sherlock Holmes: The Case of the Rose Tattoo.
- Wiggins and other Baker Street Irregulars assist Holmes in some titles in the Sherlock Holmes video game series by Frogwares, such as the 2004 game Sherlock Holmes: The Case of the Silver Earring.

=== Board games ===
- The Baker Street Irregulars play a lead role in the series of cooperative board games Sherlock Holmes: Consulting Detective, first published in 1981 with multiple expansions released later. In 2020 the fourth game in the series was released, titled 'The Baker Street Irregulars'. The board game was adapted for the 1991–1993 Sherlock Holmes: Consulting Detective video game series, though the Irregulars do not play a lead role in the video games.

=== Print ===
- Terrance Dicks wrote a series of children's novels titled The Baker Street Irregulars. The ten books in the series were published between 1978 and 1987.
- A series of four graphic novels released in 2011, titled Sherlock Holmes: The Baker Street Irregulars, was written by Tony Lee and illustrated by Dan Boultwood. It was adapted into a play, also titled Sherlock Holmes: The Baker Street Irregulars, by Eric Coble.
- The Baker Street Irregulars appear in Anthony Horowitz's 2011 novel The House of Silk.

== In popular culture ==
- The name was used for the literary society The Baker Street Irregulars founded in 1934 by Christopher Morley.
- The Special Operations Executive (SOE), tasked by Winston Churchill to "set Europe ablaze" during World War II, had its headquarters at 64 Baker Street and was often called "the Baker Street Irregulars" after Sherlock Holmes's fictional group.
- Hazel Meade's troop of children serve as couriers and lookouts in the "Baker Street Irregulars" during the lunar revolution of Robert A. Heinlein's The Moon is a Harsh Mistress (1966).
- The name is borrowed by the 1968 novel and its 1979 film adaptation The North Avenue Irregulars, a story of simple church parishioners who assist the government in taking down local criminals.
- The group is mentioned briefly in the 2013 Doctor Who episode "Hide" as the Eleventh Doctor discusses the involvement of Professor Palmer in the Special Operations Executive.
- The Baker Street Irregulars are mentioned in Douglas Preston and Lincoln Child's Agent Pendergast novel, White Fire (2013). During the plot of the novel, Agent Pendergast teams up with a fictional member of the group to find a "lost" Sherlock Holmes story entitled "The Adventure of Aspern Hall".
