= Sherlock Holmes (2014 TV series) =

- Genre: Puppetry
- Based on: Canon of Sherlock Holmes
- Written by: Kōki Mitani
- Directed by: Studio Nova
- Voices of: Koichi Yamadera; Wataru Takagi; Keiko Horiuchi
- Narrated by: Wataru Takagi
- Theme music composer: WEST GROUND
- Opening theme: "Scarlet Story"
- Composer: Kana Hiramatsu
- Country of origin: Japan
- Original language: Japanese
- No. of seasons: 2
- No. of episodes: 28

Production
- Executive producer: Nobuhisa Kihira
- Running time: 20 min. (Series 1); 30 min. (Series 2)

Original release
- Network: NHK General TV (GTV) and NHK Educational TV (ETV)
- Release: March 25, 2014 – September 24, 2015

Related
- Let's search 'Sherlock Holmes' thoroughly Sherlock Holmes Awards; Sherloc-Q!

Sherlock Holmes (シャーロック ホームズ), also known as Puppet Entertainment Sherlock Holmes, is a Japanese puppetry television series written by Kōki Mitani and produced and broadcast by NHK. The puppets for the series were designed by Bunta Inoue.

The first series, consisting of 18 episodes, was broadcast on Sundays from 12 October 2014 to 15 February 2015 on NHK Educational TV (ETV). The first six episodes were previously broadcast on NHK General TV (GTV) in March and August 2014. A special programme titled 放送直前SP 徹底調査!シャーロックホームズ ("Let's Search 'Sherlock Holmes' Thoroughly") was aired on 5 October 2014, and a segment titled "Sherlock Holmes Award" was broadcast on 28 December 2014. Each episode was rebroadcast on the following Friday. The programme received the Japan Sherlock Holmes Award on 22 March 2015.

The series is based on the Canon of Sherlock Holmes, with characters and events adapted to a fictional London boarding school, where a teenage Sherlock Holmes (voiced by Kōichi Yamadera) investigates various incidents with his roommate John H. Watson (voiced by Wataru Takagi). There are no murder cases, and some characters appear in situations or stories where they did not feature in the original works.

Some episodes began being rebroadcast from 22 February 2015. The production of new episodes was announced on the official programme website and on the "Sherlock Gakuen" website. Staff member Kunio Yoshikawa stated that an English-language version was also planned for production and broadcast.

On 1 June 2015, NHK announced that a new series, titled Holmes and Watson Mystery – (No heya: A Room of Mystery), would be broadcast on Thursdays from July to September 2015. The series featured John H. Watson providing commentary on Holmes's deductions, and also included rebroadcasts of some episodes from the first series.

== Premise and character adaptations ==
John H. Watson, a boy who transfers from Australia to a fictional London boarding school called Beeton School, becomes the roommate of Sherlock Holmes. Although Holmes has a reputation as a troublemaker, he possesses sharp powers of observation, and together the two solve the various incidents that occur at the school at the request of teachers and pupils.

The name "Beeton School" is derived from Beeton's Christmas Annual, the magazine in which the character Sherlock Holmes first appeared, as well as from Eton College.

In the series, Sherlock Holmes is portrayed as an eccentric but intelligent pupil who lives in room 221B of Baker House, one of the houses of Beeton School. He frequently sleeps during lessons and receives poor marks, particularly in literature, philosophy and astronomy. Teachers regard him as a troublemaker, but he demonstrates exceptional deductive reasoning skills and blows a party horn when thinking deeply.

John H. Watson (pronounced "Watoson" in Japanese) is a transfer student from Australia and Holmes's roommate (Holmes is pronounced "Homuzu" in Japanese). He has a strong sense of justice and records their investigations in a notebook called the "Watoson Memo" (Memo by John H. Watson), which is published in the school paper, the "Strand Wall Poster" (a wall newspaper). Initially disheartened after a leg injury forces him to retire from playing rugby football, Watson regains his confidence through the case of Jefferson Hope ("The First Adventure") and comes to understand Holmes.

Mrs Hudson (pronounced "Hadoson" in Japanese) serves as the housemother of Baker House (pronounced "Beika" in Japanese). She is cheerful and enjoys singing and baking cookies. She is the only character who calls Holmes by his first name, Sherlock (pronounced "Sharokku" in Japanese). After Holmes helps her out of trouble in "The First Adventure," she develops a motherly affection for Holmes and Watson.

James Moriarty (pronounced "Jeimuzu Moriati" in Japanese) is the tall, blond deputy headmaster of Beeton School. He has a dual-natured appearance: the right side of his face appears calm, while the left looks stern. He oversees the school and maintains strict discipline, particularly towards Holmes, whose independent behaviour often frustrates him.

Mycroft Holmes (pronounced "Maikurofuto" in Japanese) is a sixth form student of Dealer House, the elder brother of Sherlock, and the founder of the Diogenes Club within the school.

Irene Adler is the school nurse who is romantically involved with Headmaster Ormstein but later becomes involved with art teacher Godfrey Norton. Her elegance and charm captivate both male teachers and pupils. She occasionally assists Holmes in his investigations and is known to playfully snap her fingers at his nose.

Gordon Lestrade (pronounced "Resutoredo" in Japanese) is a pupil of Cooper House with a mod-style appearance. He serves on the school's life guidance committee but helps Holmes with cases that teachers disapprove of, particularly those opposed by Grimesby Roylott, the teacher responsible for student life guidance.

Langdale Pike acts as Holmes's informant. He is quick and resourceful, though notoriously stingy. He partly fills the role of the Baker Street Irregulars through a group of mice that gather information for Holmes.

Sherman, a taxidermist in The Sign of the Four, is reimagined as a female pupil who loves animals and speaks in a boyish manner. She cooperates with Holmes in his investigations.

== Production ==
=== Development ===
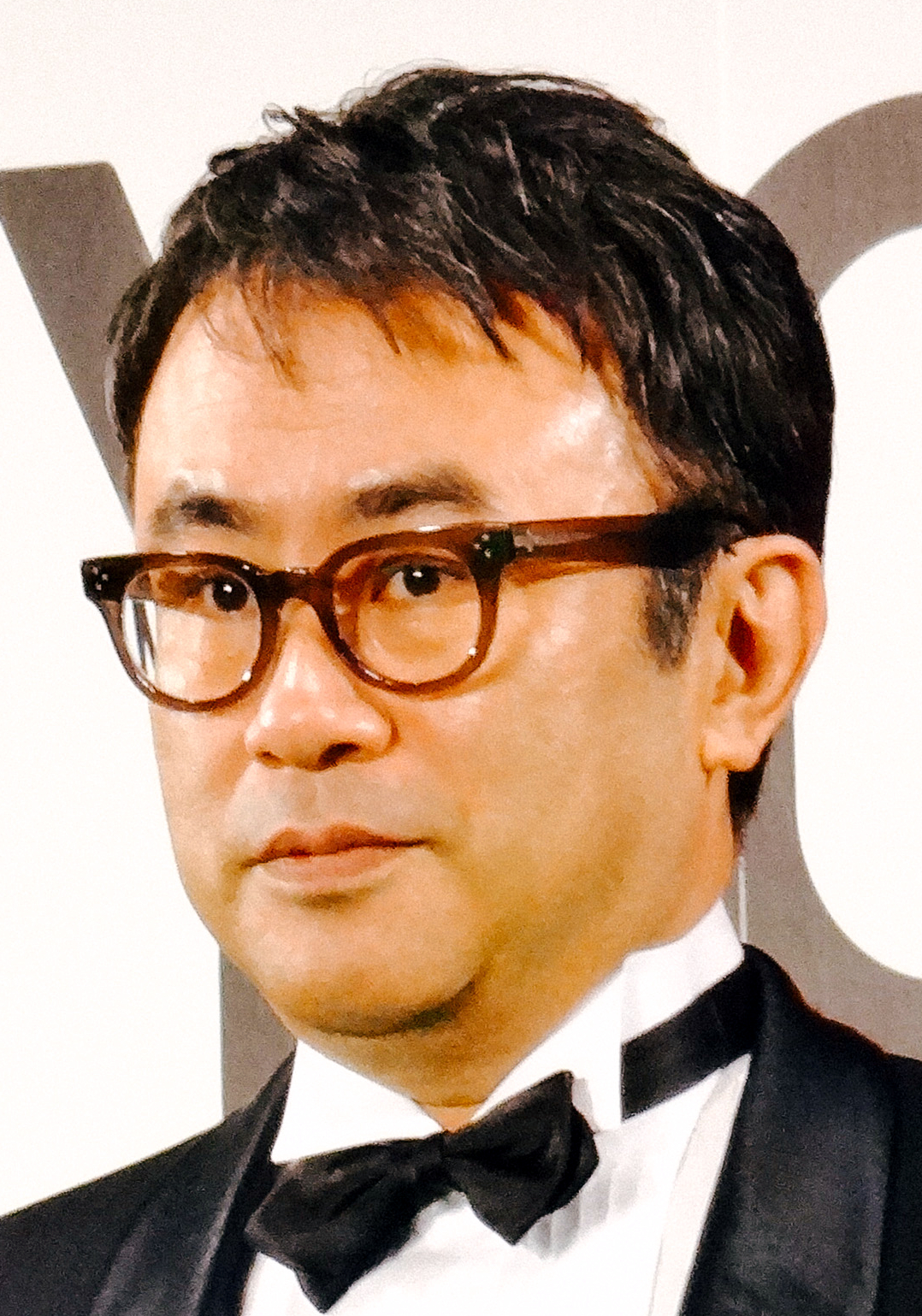
Kōki Mitani

Following the broadcast of The Three Musketeers from 2009 to 2010, Kōki Mitani planned to adapt The Brothers Karamazov into a puppetry production. Although a long-time admirer of the Sherlock Holmes stories, Mitani was initially reluctant to adapt them for puppetry due to the difficulty of conveying investigative details through puppet performance. He was also concerned that it might be too late to produce a Sherlock Holmes adaptation, given the enduring popularity of The Adventures of Sherlock Holmes and the acclaim already received by the modern series Sherlock.

Mitani initially considered creating a puppet closely resembling Sidney Paget's famous illustrations of Holmes, but abandoned the idea because tall puppets are difficult for puppeteers to manipulate. He ultimately decided to set the story in a fictional boarding school called "Beeton School", reimagining Sherlock Holmes as a fifteen-year-old schoolboy. Although many incidents occur within the school, the series contains no murders, and the same puppets are reused throughout.

According to Mitani, as the story progresses, viewers gradually come to understand the reason the series is set in a school. All four of Arthur Conan Doyle's novels — A Study in Scarlet, The Sign of the Four, The Hound of the Baskervilles, and The Valley of Fear — are dramatised in the puppetry. Mitani has stated that this may be the first adaptation to dramatise all four novels within a single series.

At a press conference in March 2014, Mitani remarked that only true Sherlockians would enjoy the series. Although this comment attracted criticism, he later clarified that what he meant was that genuine Sherlockians possess a sense of playfulness and open-mindedness that allows them to appreciate any adaptation of the Sherlock Holmes canon, and that the source material is rich enough to inspire creative derivative works.

Mitani also emphasised the importance of John Watson's role as a storyteller, calling it a brilliant invention by Arthur Conan Doyle. He described Watson as possessing warmth and passion that Holmes lacks, and expressed admiration for Martin Freeman's good-natured portrayal of Watson in Sherlock. In 2007, Freeman appeared in the stage play The Last Laugh, based on Mitani's play University of Laughs (Warai no daigaku, 笑の大学).

=== Puppets and sets ===
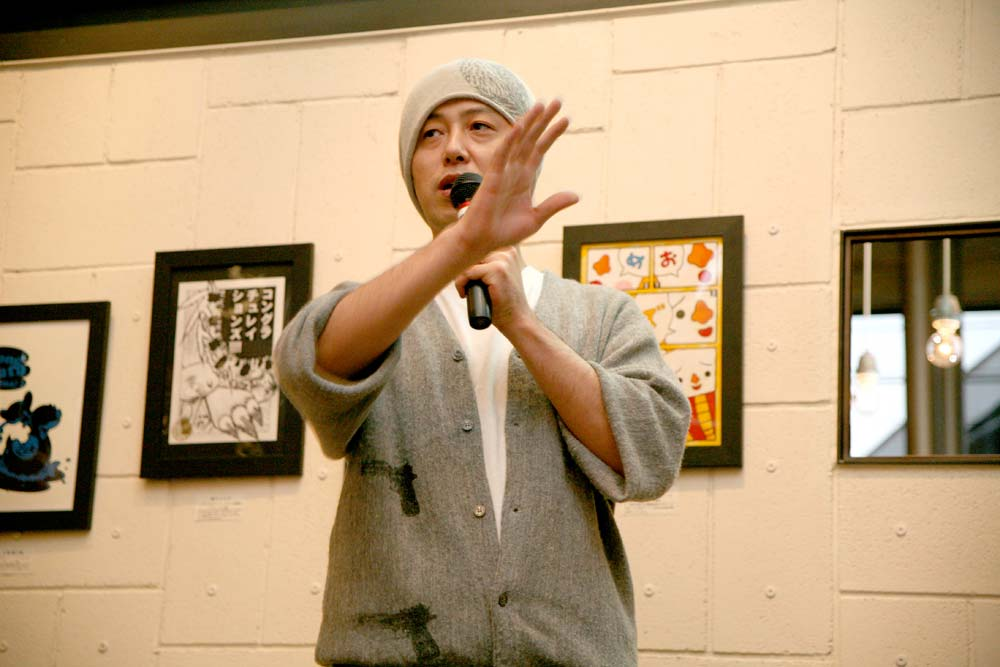
Bunta Inoue

Mitani stated that anything performed by a human can also be performed by a puppet. The puppets used in the series were designed by painter Bunta Inoue. To emphasise Holmes's intelligence, Inoue designed the character with large ears and a broad forehead, while also giving him a distinctive nose reminiscent of the original illustrations. Mitani provided Inoue with detailed guidance on the puppets' appearance. For instance, the designs of Sir Henry Baskerville and Stapleton, characters from the episode based on The Hound of the Baskervilles, were modelled on Prince William and Woody Allen, respectively.

Inoue explained that he aimed to make the puppets appealing to children and to inspire them to create their own doodles. He also served as a judge for an illustration contest featuring this series and The Three Musketeers, held in Edogawa Ward, Tokyo, in September 2014. The faces of the puppets are generally expressionless, with emotion conveyed primarily through lighting effects, similar to techniques used in Noh and Bunraku theatre. The hair of male puppets is painted in bright, carousel-like colours, while shibori dyeing techniques are used for the hair of female puppets.

As the series is produced in Japan, washi paper is frequently used in the construction of sets and props, including bags, tea sets, and lanterns illuminated by LED lamps. Washi is also used for trees and interior decorations, often combined with cheesecloth and nonwoven fabric to create a natural and warm atmosphere. Nonwoven fabric is particularly valued for preventing light reflection during filming. The overall appearance of the set resembles that of a dollhouse, with the cloister modelled on that of an abbey in the Cotswolds. The design team also drew inspiration from the stained glass at the Sherlock Holmes Museum and the architecture of St Pancras Station when constructing the set.

Beeton School features a four-house system, with each house represented by a distinct colour: dark red for Archer, dark blue for Baker, green for Cooper, and grey for Dealer. These colours are reflected in the pupils' uniforms. Holmes wears the dark blue uniform of Baker House and displays a clock and a pair of compasses on his left chest, while Watson continues to wear the pale brown uniform of his former school. In Inoue's original sketches, Holmes carries a cane topped with a skull, and the words "Sherlock Holmes" are inscribed on the soles of his shoes using the stick figure characters from The Adventure of the Dancing Men.

=== Voice acting ===
For the selection of voice actors, Mitani asked the experienced actor Koichi Yamadera to voice Holmes, recognising that considerable acting skill was required to portray the complex character. Mitani has praised Yamadera for performing the role as if he were a boy who is naive and sensitive, despite not being so in reality.

As with The Three Musketeers, some voice actors perform multiple roles in the series. Masashi Ebara provides the voices of Jim Moriarty, Godfrey Norton, Aloysius Garcia, and Barnicot, while Yuko Sanpei voices Enoch Drebber, Helen Stoner, and Henderson.

In the episode "The Adventure of the Cheerful Four", actors Masachika Ichimura and Kenji Urai, known for their work in musical theatre, provide the voices for several puppets.

=== Music and opening theme ===
Kana Hiramatsu, a member of Spanish Connection, was responsible for the series' music. Nano, a singer and fan of the Sherlock Holmes series, performed and wrote the lyrics for the opening theme, "Scarlet Story", which is inspired by A Study in Scarlet. The song seeks to convey Holmes's inner struggles as he relentlessly pursues the truth.

The series is produced using prescoring, and projection mapping is employed in the title sequence to illustrate "The Adventure of the Dancing Men".

=== Playfulness ===
As with Mitani's other works, playfulness is a notable element of the series. For example, the episode adapted from The Sign of the Four is presented as a musical play; in The Adventure of the Speckled Band, each speckle on the snake is shaped like a crocus, the flower mentioned by Holmes in the original story. Additionally, Holmes's violin is placed on a shelf among his personal belongings near his bed. Some words and dialogue in the series appear to reference the modern series Sherlock.

== Cast ==
=== Main characters ===
- Kōichi Yamadera as Sherlock Holmes
- Wataru Takagi as John H. Watson
- Keiko Horiuchi as Mrs. Hudson
- Masashi Ebara as James Moriarty
- Rie Miyazawa as Irene Adler
- Daisuke Kishio as Gordon Lestrade
- Tomokazu Seki as Langdale Pike
- Kami Hiraiwa as Sherman

=== Other pupils ===
==== Archer House pupils ====
- Fuminori Komatsu as Abdullah, a pupil from India and roommate of Arthur Morstan
- Masashi Ebara as Aloysius Garcia, who goes missing in "The Adventure of the Serious Witness"
- Yūko Sanpei as Henderson, Garcia's roommate who also goes missing
- Satoshi Tsumabuki as Jefferson Hope, who seeks revenge on Drebber and Stangerson in "The First Adventure"
- Keiko Toda as Isadora Klein, a female juvenile gang leader at Beeton School
- Kenji Urai as Arthur Morstan, who forms the chorus band "The Treasures" with the Sholto twins
- Anna Ishibashi as Mary Morstan, Arthur Morstan's younger sister and Watson's love interest
- Daisuke Kishio as Stamford, a model pupil
- Sosuke Ikematsu as Jack Stapleton, a childhood friend of Mary Morstan who enjoys excavating fossils and harasses Mary's boyfriends

==== Baker House pupils ====
- Atsuko Takaizumi as Agatha, tutored privately by Charles Augustus Milverton
- Zen Kajihara as Beppo, who damages plaster works in "The First Adventure" and asks Holmes for help in "The Adventure of the Portrait of a Teacher"
- Shinji Takeda as Duncan Ross, who invites Jabez Wilson to join the Red-Headed Club

==== Cooper House pupils ====
- Masashi Ebara as Barnicot, one of the editors of the school newspaper
- Yōsuke Asari as Baynes, who provokes Holmes in "The Adventure of the Serious Witness"
- Fuminori Komatsu as Jabez Wilson, a red-headed pupil
- Tatsuya Fujiwara as James Windibank, one of Mary Sutherland's childhood friends who pretends to be Hosmar Angel

==== Dealer House pupils ====
- Tomohiko Imai as Henry Baskerville, who encounters a fearsome "Monster Dog" at the back of Beeton School
- Yuko Sanpei as Enoch Drebber, a delinquent pupil frequently accompanied by Joseph Stangerson
- Kōichi Yamadera as Mycroft Holmes, Sherlock's elder brother and head of the pupil council
- Masanori Ishii as Wilson Kemp, who kidnaps Sherman in "The Adventure of the Dog's Language Interpreter"
- Hiromasa Taguchi as Bartholomew and Theddaus Sholto, twin members of "The Treasures"
- Daisuke Kishio as Joseph Stangerson, a friend of Enoch Drebber
- Catherine Seto as Mary Sutherland, who asks Holmes to find Hosmar Angel in "The Adventure of the Missing Boyfriend"

=== Teachers and school staff ===
- Yasunoti Danda as Charles Augustus Milverton, a history teacher
- Masashi Ebara as Godfrey Norton, an art teacher
- Baijaku Nakamura as Headmaster Ormstein
- Kazuyuki Asano as Grimesby Roylott, chemistry teacher and life guidance advisor
- Yuko Sanpei as Helen Stoner, a trainee chemistry teacher

=== Other characters ===
- Masachika Ichimura as Jonathan Small, a mail carrier and member of "The Treasures" who attacks other members in "The Adventure of the Cheerful Four"
- Kōki Mitani as Mr. Douglas, an American living behind Beeton School, appearing in "The Adventure of the Residence of Mr. Douglas"
- Yasuko Fujino as Mrs. Douglas, suspected by Watson of murdering her husband
- Takahiko Sakoda as Inspector MacDonald, investigating Mr. Douglas's murder

=== Animals ===
- Toby and Sophy, dogs owned by Sherman
- Baker House Irregulars, a group of mice corresponding to the Baker Street Irregulars in the original stories

Most of the animals in the series are voiced by Kōichi Yamadera.

== Episode list ==
=== Series 1 ===
No.	Title	Original release date
1–2	"The First Adventure" "Saisho no bōken" (最初の冒険)	12 October 2014; 19 October 2014; 25–26 March and 14 and 17 August 2014 (GTV)
John H. Watson, a transfer student from Australia, becomes the roommate of Sherlock Holmes in room 221B of Baker House at Beeton School, though he feels a sense of emptiness after retiring from playing rugby. Shortly afterwards, Watson witnesses a pupil breaking a plaster hippo to find something inside. He is wrongly accused by Deputy Headmaster Moriarty, but Holmes pleads on his behalf. Later, Dealer House pupils Enoch Drebber and Joseph Stangerson are hospitalised due to violent stomachaches. Though initially blamed on Mrs. Hudson's baked goods, Holmes discovers eggshells in their rooms and ascertains that Jefferson Hope, previously bullied and forced to leave school by Drebber and Stangerson, sought revenge by making them eat rotten eggs. The contents of the plaster hippo are another matter. Loosely based on A Study in Scarlet and The Adventure of the Six Napoleons.
3	"The Adventure of the Headmaster with Trouble" "Komatta kôchô sensei no bōken" (困った校長先生の冒険)	26 October 2014; 27 March and 17 August 2014 (GTV)
Headmaster Ormstein requests Holmes to retrieve a photograph of himself and nurse Irene Adler. Holmes feigns illness to access the nurse's office and observes Adler and art teacher Godfrey Norton painting portraits of Ormstein. Holmes later stages a false fire with Watson to trap Adler, but she outwits him, revealing she had already returned the photograph. Loosely based on A Scandal in Bohemia.
4	"The Adventure of the Missing Boyfriend" "Kieta bōifurendo no bōken" (消えたボーイフレンドの冒険)	2 November 2014; 19 and 21 August 2014 (GTV)
Mary Sutherland requests Holmes to locate her missing boyfriend, Hosmar Angel, who disappeared in a cave behind the school. Holmes doubts that Angel and Windibank, one of Sutherland's childhood friends, are the same person. Searching the cave with Watson, they find a hidden exit and confirm that no pupil named Hosmar Angel is enrolled at the school. Loosely based on A Case of Identity.
5	"The Adventure of the Red-Headed Club" "Akage kurabu no bōken" (赤毛クラブの冒険)	9 November 2014; 21 and 23 August 2014 (GTV)
Jabez Wilson, a red-headed pupil, visits 221B after being invited to join the Red-Headed Club by Duncan Ross. The club's activities—painting balls, stones, bottles, and a replica of Venus de Milo red—take place in a storeroom. Holmes deduces the club is a ruse by Ross to prevent Wilson from approaching the pond where he sketches as an art club member. Loosely based on The Red-Headed League.
6	"The Adventure of the Serious Witness" "Kimajime na shōnin no bōken" (生真面目な証人の冒険)	16 November 2014
Pupils Garcia and Henderson go missing despite being grounded for stealing bread from the dining hall. Baynes suspects Lestrade, a member of the life guidance committee. Holmes realises the disappearance is a trick by Garcia and Henderson exploiting Baynes' seriousness. Holmes deduces their plan using a piece of wood, a dog toy found in their room, and Baynes' behaviour. Loosely based on The Adventure of Wisteria Lodge.
7	"The Adventure of the Dogs' Language Interpreter" "Inugo tsūyaku no bōken" (イヌ語通訳の冒険)	23 November 2014
Sherman is kidnapped and forced to interpret a dog's language to recover a stolen Neanderthal bone. Holmes seeks assistance from his elder brother, Mycroft, head of the pupil council. Together, Holmes, Watson, and Mycroft recover the bone and uncover the kidnapper's identity, Wilson Kemp, who resides in Dealer House. Loosely based on The Adventure of the Greek Interpreter.
8–9	"The Adventure of the Cheerful Four" "Yukai na yoningumi no bōken" (愉快な四人組の冒険)	30 November 2014; 7 December 2014
Mary Morstan visits 221B to learn the truth behind an attack on her brother Arthur. Holmes investigates unusual signs in Arthur's room, including torn paper, small handprints, and the behaviour of the Sholto twins of "The Treasures" vocal group. Using the "Baker House Irregulars", Holmes uncovers that mailman Jonathan Small is attempting to steal the score of "Agra Treasure". Loosely based on The Sign of the Four.
10	"The Adventure of the Portrait of a Teacher" "Shitsurei na nigaoe no bōken" (失礼な似顔絵の冒険)	14 December 2014
Beppo draws a portrait of teacher Charles Augustus Milverton. Milverton confiscates it for severity, prompting Beppo to enlist Holmes and Watson to retrieve it. They discover Agatha, a nervous pupil, tutored privately. Holmes and Watson recognise Milverton's kindness when he later praises Beppo's talent. Loosely based on The Adventure of Charles Augustus Milverton.
11	"The Adventure of the Speckled Band" "Madara no himo no bôken" (まだらの紐の冒険)	21 December 2014; 23 August and 27 September 2014 (GTV); Broadcast as episode 6 by GTV
Mrs. Hudson discovers a large speckled snake and informs Holmes and Watson. Trainee teacher Helen Stoner tells them of chemistry teacher Grimesby Roylott's strange behaviour. That night, they uncover the truth, though Sherman is attacked by the snake. Loosely based on The Adventure of the Speckled Band and The Adventure of the Creeping Man.
12–13	"The Adventure of Henry Baskerville and a Dog" "Baskābiru kun to inu no bōken" (バスカーヴィル君と犬の冒険)	4 January 2015; 11 January 2015
Henry Baskerville witnesses a "Monster Dog" at Dealer House. Holmes decodes stick figures posted in the school, while Watson investigates with Mary Morstan and Sherman. Stapleton secretly harasses Mary's suitors, but Holmes later identifies Baynes as the figure poster. Loosely based on Hound of the Baskervilles and The Adventure of the Dancing Men.
14	"The Adventure of the One Hundred Tadpoles" "Hyappiki no otamajakushi no bōken" (百匹のオタマジャクシの冒険)	18 January 2015
Nurse Irene Adler informs Holmes and Watson that Barnicot wants to reclaim his stolen artwork for a school art competition themed on tadpoles. Holmes and Watson recover the artwork from Wilson Kemp, who had hidden it, though the piece is later discovered to be counterfeit. Loosely based on The Adventure of the Naval Treaty.
15	"The Adventure of the Blue Polar Bear" "Aoi shirokuma no bōken" (青いシロクマの冒険)	25 January 2015
Holmes and Watson shelter Jabez Wilson in 221B. He is pursued by Garcia and Henderson, who seek a blue polar bear doll. The doll had passed through several pupils' hands, including art teacher Godfrey Norton. Norton reveals that Isadora Klein, a pupil and female gang leader, originally made the doll and had thrown it at him. Holmes and Watson investigate, but Holmes' triumphant manner upsets Klein and angers Watson. Loosely based on The Adventure of the Three Gables and The Adventure of the Blue Carbuncle.
16	"The Adventure of the Residence of Mr. Douglas" "Dagurasu san no oyashiki no bōken" (ダグラスさんのお屋敷の冒険)	1 February 2015
Holmes learns of the apparent murder of Mr. Douglas, a resident behind Beeton School. Accompanied by Watson, he visits the house and encounters Jefferson Hope, who is working as a mail carrier and sculptor. Holmes explains his deduction to Inspector MacDonald, facilitated by Deputy Headmaster Moriarty. Eventually, they discover Mr. Douglas is alive, but Holmes and Watson are suspended for breaking school rules. Loosely based on The Valley of Fear.
17	"The Adventure of the Headmaster with Serious Trouble" "Hontō ni komatta kōchōsensei no bōken" (本当に困った校長先生の冒険)	8 February 2015
Headmaster Ormstein requests Holmes to retrieve stolen love letters sent to Isadora Klein. Holmes uses a mannequin to continue his investigation while suspended. He ultimately recovers the letters from Wilson Kemp. Moriarty reveals the situation was orchestrated and instructs Holmes to consider leaving the school. Holmes promises Watson that they will meet again before leaving 221B. Loosely based on The Adventure of the Mazarin Stone.
18	"The Last Adventure" "Saigo no bōken" (最後の冒険)	15 February 2015
The mystery of the Headmaster's love letters is resolved. Headmaster Ormstein, Deputy Headmaster Moriarty, and Holmes each take responsibility and depart from Beeton School. Mycroft Holmes, opposed to his brother, becomes involved but is not blamed. Holmes promises Watson they will meet again and leaves school with a farewell from teachers, pupils, and Mrs. Hudson, and is welcomed outside by Jefferson Hope. Holmes briefly sees an illusion of Irene Adler, now on honeymoon with Godfrey Norton, leaving some matters unresolved at the school. Loosely based on The Final Problem.

Episodes 5 and 6 were originally scheduled for broadcast on 20 and 22 August 2014 by GTV but were postponed due to a landslide in Hiroshima. "The Adventure of the Speckled Band" was broadcast as the sixth episode by GTV; ETV broadcast it as episode 11.

In "The Adventure of the Cheerful Four", the original story is adapted into a musical, featuring "Golden Slumbers (cradle song)", "Greensleeves", and "Agra Treasure" (an original composition). Toccata and Fugue in D minor, BWV 565 is also used. The phrase "Where does a wise man hide a leaf? In the forest." is quoted from "The Innocence of Father Brown".

=== A Room of Mystery (Misteri no heya) ===
A spin-off of the series broadcast by NHK Educational TV and NTT's Hikari TV from July to September 2015. Each episode features a first-series story followed by a quiz programme presented by puppet characters John H. Watson, Lestrade, and Langdale Pike.

== Related programmes ==
=== Special programmes ===
A special programme, "放送直前SP 徹底調査！シャーロックホームズ" (Let's Search "Sherlock Holmes" Thoroughly!), was broadcast on 5 October 2014 by NHK Educational TV to promote the series one week before its ETV debut. The programme featured stage actor and YouTube personality Kōji Seto, who reported on the production of the puppet show, interviewed the puppeteers, and spoke with Holmesians at a cosplay event in Leeds, at the Sherlock Holmes Museum, and at the Sherlock Holmes Pub in London, showcasing their reactions to the show.

In July 2015, a promotional programme for A Room of Mystery aired, including additional interviews with Wataru Takagi, the voice of John H. Watson.

=== Sherlock Holmes Award ===
Another special programme, Sherlock Holmes Award, was broadcast on 28 December 2014 during the series' New Year break. Presented by Kōichi Yamadera, the programme featured an awards ceremony, interviews with Kana Hiramatsu, Daniel Harding, Nano, and Bunta Inoue, and a preview of upcoming episodes.

=== Mystery Quiz "Sherloc-Q!" ===
A short segment produced with the cooperation of the Japan Sherlock Holmes Club, navigated by animated versions of Holmes and Watson. It was broadcast after the main part of an episode and presented viewers with a multiple-choice quiz featuring three options.

=== Studio Park kara konnnichiwa ===
Kōichi Yamadera appeared on NHK's show Studio Park kara konnnichiwa on 13 November 2014, where he discussed his career as a voice actor and his role as Sherlock Holmes. He also performed an interpretation of a silent film by Charles Chaplin.

== Events ==
From 30 November to 28 December 2014, an exhibition of puppets and sets from the series was held at Studio Park in the NHK Broadcasting Center, Tokyo, which included a workshop on operating puppets. On the final day of the event, Wataru Takagi, the voice of John H. Watson, participated in the workshop.

Bunta Inoue exhibited some puppets from Sherlock Holmes at Art Fair Tokyo, held from 20 to 22 March 2015. Additional puppets, including newly created ones, were displayed in various locations such as Yokohama and Kyoto throughout 2015. From July to September 2015, an exhibition of the puppets was held in Yokohama. Another exhibition, titled "Nippon Daaisuki Ten" (にっぽんだぁいすきてん), was scheduled at Happoen, Tokyo, from 23 to 29 August 2015.

== Media ==
=== DVDs ===
The series has been released on DVD by Pony Canyon:

- Vol. 1 (Episodes 1–3) – released on 16 July 2014
- Vol. 2 (Episodes 4–6) – released on 19 November 2014
- Vol. 3 (Episodes 7–9) – released on 17 December 2014
- Vol. 4 (Episodes 10, 12 and 13) – released on 21 January 2015
- Vol. 5 (Episodes 11, 14 and 15) – released on 18 February 2015
- Vol. 6 (Episodes 16–18) – released on 18 March 2015

A Blu-ray box set containing all eighteen episodes and bonus footage on three discs was released on 18 March 2015.

=== CD ===
A soundtrack CD was released on 16 February 2015. Nano's album Rock On, which includes "Scarlet Story", was released on 28 January 2015.

=== Novelisation ===
Novelisations of the series are published by Shueisha:

- 少年シャーロック ホームズ 15歳の名探偵!!(ISBN 4083212098) – published on 14 April 2014
- 少年シャーロック ホームズ 赤毛クラブの謎(ISBN 4083212322) – published on 5 September 2014
- 少年シャーロック ホームズ 消えた生徒たち(ISBN 978-4-08-321248-2) – published on 5 January 2015
- 少年シャーロック ホームズ こわい先生たちのヒミツ(ISBN 978-4-08-321251-2) – published on 5 February 2015

=== Guidebook ===
A guidebook providing information about the programme, シャーロックホームズ冒険ファンブック, was published by Shogakukan on 4 October 2014 (ISBN 9784091065445).
A memorial book summarising all eighteen episodes, シャーロックホームズ完全メモリアルブック, was published by Shogakukan on 26 February 2015 (ISBN 9784091065513).

=== Other merchandising ===
A quiz book, NHKシャーロックホームズ推理クイズブック, was published by Shufu to Seikatsu Sha on 21 November 2014 (ISBN 9784391146141). Although targeted at younger readers, it was written by professional mystery fiction authors, including Naohiko Kitahara of the Japan Sherlock Holmes Club. The book can be regarded as a form of pastiche, as it is not based directly on the Canon of Sherlock Holmes.

Model figures of Holmes, Watson and Irene Adler were released by De Agostini Japan on 9 October 2014.

Merchandise related to the programme, including T-shirts, mobile phone cases, tote bags and mugs, is sold on the official SUZURI website.

== See also ==
- Sherlock Holmes
- Canon of Sherlock Holmes
- The Three Musketeers (puppetry)
- Sherlock Hound
