= The Lost Files of Sherlock Holmes =

1992 adventure video game

- Cover art by John Jinks
- Developer: Mythos Software
- Publisher: Electronic Arts
- Producer: Christopher Erhardt
- Designer: R. J. Berg
- Programmer: Scott Cronce
- Artist: Nancy L. Fong
- Writer: Eric Lindstrom
- Composer: Rob Hubbard
- Platforms: MS-DOS, 3DO
- Release: Fall 1992 (MS-DOS); 1994 (3DO)
- Genre: Graphic adventure
- Mode: Single-player

The Lost Files of Sherlock Holmes (fully titled The Lost Files of Sherlock Holmes: The Case of the Serrated Scalpel) is an adventure game developed by Mythos Software and published by Electronic Arts for MS-DOS in 1992 and 3DO in 1994. A sequel was developed and published by the same respective companies in 1996 titled The Lost Files of Sherlock Holmes: The Case of the Rose Tattoo.

== Plot ==
In November 1888, Sherlock Holmes is engaged by Inspector Lestrade of Scotland Yard to help with the murder investigation of a young actress, Sarah Carroway. She was killed outside a theatre in the Mayfair area of London. Lestrade thinks the manner of her death shows that this is another strike by Jack the Ripper, but Holmes believes someone else committed the crime. It appears that the victim was killed with an unusual knife, one shaped like a scalpel but with a serrated blade.

The investigation takes Holmes and Dr. Watson to many parts of late 19th century London, including a perfume shop, the zoological gardens, the morgue, a pub, Scotland Yard, Surrey Commercial Docks, Savoy Street Pier, St Pancras railway station, and of course 221B Baker Street. They encounter a number of characters connected to the case and also get assistance from Inspector Gregson, the leader of the Baker Street Irregulars named Wiggins, and the invaluable tracking dog Toby.

== Gameplay ==
The player moves around London via an elaborate overview map. Additional locations become available when Holmes finds additional leads. In each location, the player can select nine different verbal options to interact with objects or people. When accessing the inventory menu, the player has three different verbal actions to manipulate any items Holmes has picked up. When talking to people, Holmes has different dialogue options to gain information or try to get their cooperation. Dr. Watson can give his views, which may serve as puzzle hints. He may even help Holmes to perform an action he cannot do alone. Dr. Watson's journal also references the events in the gameplay.

The graphics are VGA, with MIDI music and a few scenes with digitalized speech (in the intro and end sequence, and the cutscene at St Pancras Station. In the other scenes there are sound effects, but no speech). The player interacts with the characters through a command menu with verb icons that is intuitive for anyone who had played other adventure games of the period. The 3DO version consists of full voiced dialogue and the portraits of the talkers were replaced by clips with filmed actors, but also drops Dr. Watson's journal feature.

In the video clips in the 3DO version, Sherlock Holmes was played by David Ian Davies, and Dr. Watson was played by Laurie Main.

== Reception ==
Reception

Review scores
| Publication | Score |
|---|---|
| Electronic Gaming Monthly | 6.6/10 (3DO) |
| PC Zone | 48% (DOS) |
| 3DO Magazine | 2/5 (3DO) |

Computer Gaming World's Charles Ardai wrote that "The Case of the Serrated Scalpel tells an unusually good story and is filled to the brim with audio-visual niceties, but ... it is not a game ... just a series of animated vignettes". He gave as example how the computer, not the player, chooses the chemicals and tools in Holmes' laboratory. Ardai concluded that "this game wants, more than anything else in the world, to be a Sherlock Holmes movie. Though it would be a very good one if it were, it is not. Therefore, it is deeply and resoundingly unsatisfying ... as a game it is simply, regrettably, another misfire in the Sherlock Holmes canon".

Computer Games Strategy Plus named The Case of the Serrated Scalpel its best adventure game of 1992. The magazine's Theo Clarke wrote: "This game wins for the sophistication of its controls and the sheer scale of the game. It is not simply that there are many locations and many characters. The point is that all of these elements combine to form a satisfying whole".

The reviewers of Electronic Gaming Monthly wrote of the 3DO version: "Great graphics, excellent sound effects – this game really shows off the system's capabilities while providing a challenging mystery". They scored it a 6.6/10 average.

In 2011, Adventure Gamers named Case of the Serrated Scalpel the 22nd-best adventure game ever released.

The Case of the Serrated Scalpel sold over 100,000 units.
