= The Dying Detective (film) =

1921 British film by Maurice Elvey

- Directed by: Maurice Elvey
- Written by: William J. Elliott (scenario)
- Based on: "The Adventure of the Dying Detective" by Arthur Conan Doyle
- Produced by: Jeffrey Bernerd
- Starring: See below
- Cinematography: Germain Burger
- Release date: 1921
- Running time: 2 reels; 2274 feet
- Country: UK
- Language: English

The Dying Detective is a 1921 British short film directed by Maurice Elvey. The film is the first in the Stoll Pictures' short film series The Adventures of Sherlock Holmes.

== Plot ==
The great detective Sherlock Holmes, near death after having contracted a rare and usually fatal Asiatic disease, is determined to solve one last murder case before he passes on.

== Cast ==
- Eille Norwood as Sherlock Holmes
- Hubert Willis as Dr. John Watson
- Cecil Humphreys as Culverton Smith
- Joseph R. Tozer as His Servant
- Mme. d'Esterre as Mrs. Hudson
