= Sherlock Holmes: The Musical =

Musical play

- Music: Leslie Bricusse
- Lyrics: Leslie Bricusse
- Book: Leslie Bricusse
- Productions: 1989 West End 1993 Old Vic

Sherlock Holmes: The Musical is a musical based on characters created by Sir Arthur Conan Doyle, with music, lyrics, and book by Leslie Bricusse. The story concerns a 1901 confrontation between Holmes and his arch-enemy Professor Moriarty; Moriarty's brilliant daughter Bella proves to be an even more determined (and beautiful) foe than her father.

The musical opened 22 October 1988 at the Northcott Theatre, in Exeter, England, and ran for a limited season of five weeks. It then played at the Cambridge Theatre on Seven Dials in London's Covent Garden area from 24 April to 8 July 1989. During this time there were public transit strikes that Ron Moody worked into the script through ad-libs.

A revival tour (in a slightly revised version) opened at the Bristol Old Vic on 16 March 1993 with Robert Powell in the title role, Roy Barraclough as Watson, and Louise English as Bella Spellgrove.

In April 2013 Leslie Bricusse worked with the Morphic Graffiti theatre company to revise and revamp the show within a Victorian Music Hall setting at Hoxton Hall in London, which itself is a 145-year-old grade II listed Music Hall Theatre. Now called The Revenge of Sherlock Holmes, the revised version included new never previously performed material, and opened to critical acclaim.

Among the numerous adaptations of Sherlock Holmes, the Bricusse score was preceded by at least two other Holmes musicals: Baker Street in 1965 and Ein Fall für Sherlock Holmes in 1982.

== Plot ==
The play opens after Professor Moriarty's death and Sherlock Holmes' miraculous return to life. As Dr. Watson and Mrs. Hudson describe the many eccentricities on their friend ("Sherlock Holmes"), we find that Holmes is, to Watson's disbelief, missing Moriarty. ("Without Him There Can Be No Me"). Holmes is quickly assured that there is plenty of work left for him in London ("Anything You Want To Know") ("London is London"), and he is temporarily reassured.

But at a meeting with the beautiful Bella Spellgrove (the daughter of Professor Moriarty) Watson, though married, is immediately taken with her beauty ("Her Face"). Though Holmes is not as immediately smitten, he is drawn into a battle of wits of sort when Bella accuses him of hiding behind Watson's 'loveable moose' so that he can feel better about himself ("Men Like You"), which she claims as a great annoyance to women of her intelligence. We then see Mrs. Hudson lamenting the hardships in her own life, as a widow forced to rent rooms to lodgers to make ends meet ("A Lousy Life").

Act Two opens with a desperate search for Bella, as Holmes is afraid that by losing her he loses the last link to Moriarty, a connection he still misses terribly ("I Shall Find Her"). But, unbeknownst to Holmes, Bella and her mother, Mrs. Moriarty (who was a trained Italian opera singer before her marriage) are plotting to bring 'death and disgrace' to Holmes as revenge for killing Professor Moriarty ("Vendetta"). Bella is successfully able to frame Holmes for murder when he is found inside an attic locked on the inside with a sword and a stabbed body lying in front of him. Although Holmes protests that the victim's cause of death was diphtheria, not the multiple stab wounds, he soon finds himself on the run from Inspector Lestrade ("Sherlock Holmes (Reprise)"). Furious with himself for falling into the trap, Holmes curses women and their effect on the workings of the mind. Despite this, he cannot stop himself from thinking about Bella ("No Reason"). While Watson reminisces about his old days in the military, ("Halcyon Days"), Bella realizes that she may need Sherlock Holmes more than she cares to admit ("Without Him There Can Be No Me (Reprise)"). Holmes, meanwhile, has disguised himself and hidden amongst the poor of London ("Apples 'n' Pears"). The people of London, however, are distracted from the 'problem' of Sherlock Holmes when rumors begin to leak out that Moriarty is back ("We Shall Find Her"). Revitalized by the news and the prospect of a true mental battle, Holmes prepares himself for a sparring with Moriarty ("My Incomparable Best").

Bella imagines that she sees her father, and tells him not to appear to her unless he can stay ("A Million Years Ago, Or Was It Yesterday?"). She and Holmes are reunited, and they both admit their attraction and that, as a pair, they would never be bored, as they bring out the best in each other ("The Best of You, The Best of Me"). Holmes is able to prove that he was not, in fact the killer, and he is finally able to fill the gap that Professor Moriarty left in his life ("Finale- Sherlock Holmes").

== Roles and original cast ==
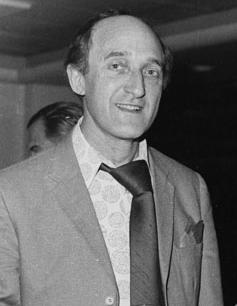
Actor Ron Moody

The original production of Sherlock Holmes: the Musical opened at the Northcott Theatre in Exeter. Its original cast included:

- Sherlock Holmes - Ron Moody
- Dr. Watson - Derek Waring
- Bella Spellgrove - Liz Robertson
- Mrs. Moriarty - Eileen Battye
- Inspector Lestrade - Roger Llewellyn
- Mrs. Hudson - Julia Sutton
- Boffy Martingdale - Colin Bennett
- Duchess of Monmouth - Elena Ferrari
- Sir Jevons Jarndyce - Lewis Barber
- Professor Moriarty - Terry Williams
- Fred Wiggins - James Francis-Johnston
- Harry Mossop - Derek Cullen
- Potatoes Clark - Jamie Hinde
- Billy Higgins - Luke Hope
- Lofty Daniel - Paul Loxton
- Mick O'Reilly - Stephen Matthews

== Song list ==
Act I

- "Sherlock Holmes" - Watson, Mrs. Hudson, Higgins, Irregulars & Company
- "Without Him, There Can Be No Me" - Holmes, Watson
- "Anything You Want to Know" - Irregulars
- "Look Around You" (Revival Cast Only - Robert Powell) - Holmes, Watson, Lestrade
- "London Is London" - Wiggins, Mossop, Bella & Company
- "Her Face" - Watson
- "Discombobulate" - ?
- "Men Like You" - Holmes, Bella
- "A Lousy Life" - Mrs. Hudson
- "I Shall Find Her" - Holmes, Bella, Watson, Wiggins, Irregulars & Company

Act II

- "Vendetta" - Bella, Mrs. Moriarty
- "Sherlock Holmes" (Reprise) - Watson, Mrs Hudson, Wiggins, Irregulars & Company
- "No Reason" - Holmes
- "Halcyon Days" - Watson, Boffy
- "Without Him, There Can Be No Me" (Reprise) - Bella
- "The Lord Abides In London" (Revival Cast) - Bella, Salvation Army, Irregulars
- "Down the Apples 'n' Pears" - Costermonger, Bella & Company
- "We Shall Find Her" - Men
- "My Incomparable Best" (Revival Cast) - ?
- "A Million Years Ago - Or Was It Yesterday?" - Bella, Moriarty"
- "The Best Of You, The Best Of Me" - Holmes, Bella"
- Finale - "Sherlock Holmes" - Company"

== Old Vic revival ==
Starting on 16 March 1993, a revival of Sherlock Holmes: The Musical ran in The Old Vic Theatre in Bristol, England. The revival featured a completely new cast as well as three new musical numbers. Besides those minor changes, the revival run remained fairly similar to the original production.

== Critical response ==
Critical response to the show's original production was largely negative. Jeremy Kingston, a reviewer from the Times of London, describes writer Leslie Bricusse as, "a man with a stream of melodies behind him but currently swirled, on the evidence of this show, into a melodic backwater." Continuing, he writes that, "The show's tone wobbles foolishly between the earnest and the jokey, with the cast clearly preferring the latter. I would rather have the whole Holmes business either sent up rotten or played for stark, staring melodrama." Describing Derek Waring as having an, "unvaried Colonel Chinstrap mode" as Watson and Ron Moody a "tart though too emotional Sherlock", his reaction seemed to match that of much of London, as it closed later that year.

The revival at the Old Vic in 1993 did not fare much better. Benedict Nightingale, who reviewed the show for the Times, wrote that, "it is pretty clear that economic, not artistic, necessity explains the show's presence. Moreover Sherlock Holmes the Musical is about as likely a notion as Einstein the Clogdance." He goes on to say that, "there is something preposterous about so cerebral a hero bursting into lyrics like (of his symbiotic relationship with Moriarty) 'without him there'd be no me... without evil there'd be no good of great degree'." Although Nightingale finds some redeeming qualities, saying that "Bricusse's quieter melodies have a more sophisticated lilt, and there are one or two other pluses in Bob Tomson's always energetic production, notably Mick Bearwish's vaulty, Thames-side set and Powell himself."
