= Beeton School =

Fictional school

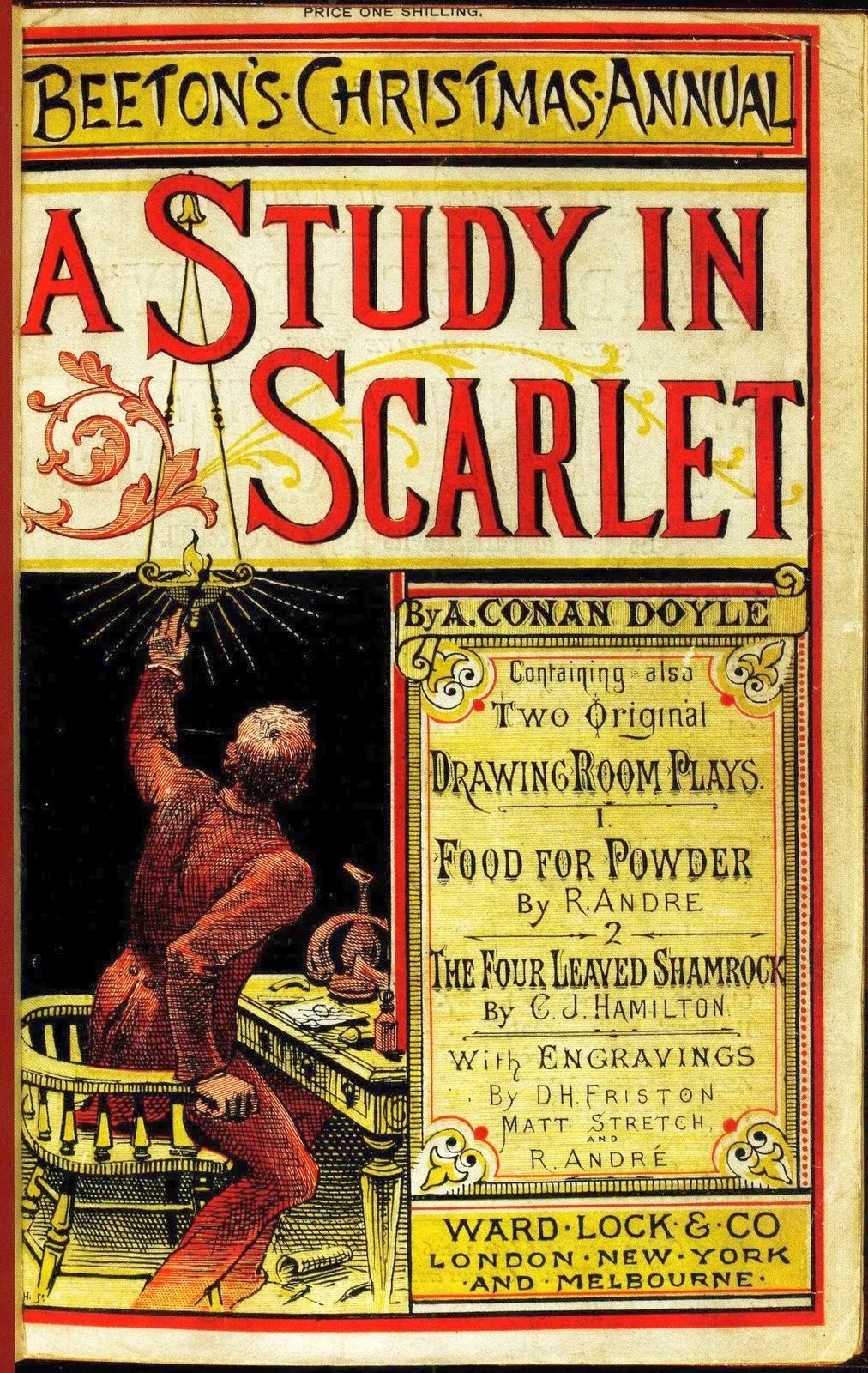
Beeton's Christmas Annual

Beeton School (ビートン校) is a fictional coeducational boarding school in which the NHK puppetry Sherlock Holmes is set. It is named after Beeton's Christmas Annual and Eton College.

== Summary ==
The school setting is the first case in the screening history of the Series of Sherlock Holmes. The school attracts Japanese high school students, who are the show's target audience. The show is not merely a simple detective drama; each episode is a platform that attempts to teach logical thinking, justice, and courage.

The school is located in the suburbs of London and has four student houses: Archer, Baker, Cooper, and Dealer. The houses surround a children's playground, located on a hilltop behind the school. A cave appears in some episodes of the series and is an important setting in some of the cases. The natural setting around the school is influenced by the scenery of the Cotswolds. The school's corridor is modeled after the corridor of an abbey in the region. The window of the nurse's office, and the wall of the school, are modeled after the stained glass of 221B Baker Street, and St Pancras railway station building, respectively. This is done in order to create an atmosphere imitating the 19th century in Britain.

A wall newspaper is hanging up on the wall, facing the corridor. The newspaper advertises Watson's name, since he constantly chronicles Holmes' deductions.

== Houses and uniform ==
The school is divided into four houses, each of which has two stories. The names and colors of the houses are as below.

Archer
Dark red
Baker
Dark blue
Cooper
Green
Dealer
Gray

The set of the dormitory is similar to a doll house. Everything that happens in it can be seen at once. Though the first floor is located further inside than the ground floor, the gap is covered by painting. The gap is used by puppeteers. Usually two pupils share the same dorm, but some pupils in Dealer house are from wealthy families and are given their own dorm with a canopy bed. Those students are also permitted to dine in their own dorms. Even though the character Sherman wears the uniform of Baker, she lives in an animal shed in the school.

The male pupils' uniform is a jacket and a midi-skirt, a kind of kilt. Female pupils wear a jacket and a full-length skirt. The colour of the uniform is based on that of each house. An emblem, embroidered with the name of each house, is attached on the left chest of jacket. Watson, however, wears the pale brown uniform of his former school in Australia.

=== 221 B, Baker house ===
Room 221 B, Baker House, is a laboratory for Holmes as well as an office where he consults with the pupils and staff who ask him to solve their problems. Entering the room, a red sofa is seen in the centre, there are also three desks to the left. Holmes has test tubes, beakers, and a spirit lamp, all used for his experiments, on one of the desks. Bookshelves are located on the left. Despite the presence of book shelves, many books are piled up all around the room. There is a bay window opposite the door.

The bedroom is in the loft. Holmes' bed is located near the window. Watson's bed is near the door. Near the beds there are shelves for personal items, including Holmes' violin. Because Holmes is so strange, his former roommates had nervous breakdowns and asked the school authorities to move them to another room. That is how Watson eventually became Holmes' roommate.

== Committee of Life Guidance ==
The Committee of Life Guidance is a school committee that gives pupils life guidance. Gordon Lestrade is a member of the committee. He often sees Holmes, because Holmes always hastens to scenes where trouble occurs in the school. Though Grimesby Roylott, who gives pupils life guidance, hates Holmes, Lestrade recognizes Holmes' faculty of reasoning. Holmes trusts Lestrade as well. Many teachers dislike Holmes, who makes poor marks, takes naps during the class, and pries into the troubles and affairs at the school. Holmes is especially disliked by Grimesby Roylott, who is severe with not only Holmes, but also his companions. Deputy Headmaster Moriarty also does not think very well of Holmes.
