= The Lost Files of Sherlock Holmes: The Case of the Rose Tattoo =

1996 adventure video game

- North American cover art by Nick Backes
- Developer: Mythos Software
- Publisher: Electronic Arts
- Producer: R. J. Berg
- Designer: R. J. Berg
- Programmers: Craig Suko; John Dunn
- Writer: R. J. Berg
- Composer: Marshall Crutcher
- Platform: MS-DOS
- Release: September 27, 1996
- Genre: Graphic adventure
- Mode: Single-player

The Lost Files of Sherlock Holmes: The Case of the Rose Tattoo is a graphic adventure game developed by Mythos Software and published by Electronic Arts for MS-DOS in 1996. It features the fictional detective Sherlock Holmes created by Arthur Conan Doyle. The game is a sequel to The Lost Files of Sherlock Holmes: The Case of the Serrated Scalpel.

== Plot ==
In October 1889, Sherlock Holmes's brother Mycroft is injured in an explosion when his club, the Diogenes, is blown up. The player, first as Dr. Watson and then as Sherlock Holmes, investigates the explosion and discovers that it was not a gas leak but a bomb which was the cause. In an encrypted note, Mycroft writes to Sherlock that a chemical formula for an extremely powerful explosive had recently been stolen from the Ministry of Defence. Though the Ministry, at Mycroft's instigation, opens an investigation regarding the theft, it's quickly and suspiciously closed by its committee members. Holmes and Watson trail various suspects provided by Mycroft, ranging from an impoverished aristocrat and an ambitious Ministry clerk to an eccentric magnate and a politically active charlady. The gruesome murder of what turns out to be a member of an exclusive Cambridge student society links the case to the machinations of a Prussian military officer who covertly tries to advance the cause of Otto von Bismarck at the expense of Kaiser Wilhelm II in a conspiracy that involved the theft of the formula, as well as the kidnapping and blackmail of investigation committee to hush up the aftermath. Holmes ultimately neutralises the conspiracy, tracks down the culprits and recovers the lost documents. In the epilogue, Holmes receives a knighthood from Queen Victoria, who asks him to keep the accolade a secret.

The plot is separate from the previous game, The Case of the Serrated Scalpel, though multiple characters return from that game, such as characters from Arthur Conan Doyle's Sherlock Holmes stories like Inspector Lestrade of Scotland Yard, as well as some minor characters original to the games like Sergeant Duncan, the desk sergeant at Scotland Yard.

== Development ==
The characters in the game were made by filming real actors in costume, against a bluescreen. While the characters are thus more lifelike, Rose Tattoo did not display large, high-quality faces shown during dialogues in the first game. A similar use of in-game video can also be found in e.g. Jones in the Fast Lane and Under a Killing Moon and in retrospect appears as a transient trend permitted by the available hardware. The CD-ROM greatly increased the data storage space available to a computer game. Most games of this period filled the empty space by enhancing the game with digitized speech and cut-scene videos. Later, advances in CPU and graphic card hardware allowed high-resolution characters to be rendered in 3D.

The game is longer than its predecessor and features a much higher degree of historical accuracy and detail. The graphics are near-photo quality and the atmospheric sounds are more realistic, while the background music, which communicated the mood of the scenes in the first game, is applied less in Rose Tattoo. Unlike the previous game, digitized speech is employed throughout the game and adds characterization to the non-player characters.

Different actors were used for the voices and visual sprites of the characters in the game. Sherlock Holmes was voiced by Jarion Monroe, and Dr. Watson was voiced by Roger L. Jackson. Coralie Persee voiced Mrs. Hudson and Paul Vincent Black voiced Wiggins. Jackson (and possibly the other actors) also voiced other characters in the game. The graphics for Sherlock Holmes and Professor Moriarty were made with the same actor, George Gregg. The story and game design were by R. J. Berg. The game's sound and music director was Rob Hubbard.

== Reception ==
Reception

Review scores
Publication	Score
PC Gamer (US)	80%
PC Zone	70/100
PC Games	A−
Computer Games Strategy Plus	3.5/5

PC Gamer's Lisa M. Howie wrote that "the interface, animations, and story are all up to par with today’s hottest titles" but also commented that the game suffers from drawbacks found in other adventure games, such as when the player clicks on a suspect to speak with that character and "Holmes (or Watson) walks around the screen so he can stand in exactly the right spot". Howie gave the game a score of 80%.

PC Games's Peter Olafson wrote a positive review of the game, writing that the characters "speak with distinctive voices rich in character and authenticity", and added that the game is "much harder" than the previous Lost Files game. Olafson gave the game an overall score of A−.

Computer Games Strategy Plus's Tim Royal wrote that in the game, "a fantastic collection of scenery sets the artistic tone. Though it would never stand trial for being 'state of the art', the hand-drawn images which comprise the gameworld really bring the settings to life". Royal scored the game 3.5/5.
