= Sofia Pekkari =

Swedish actress (born 1985)

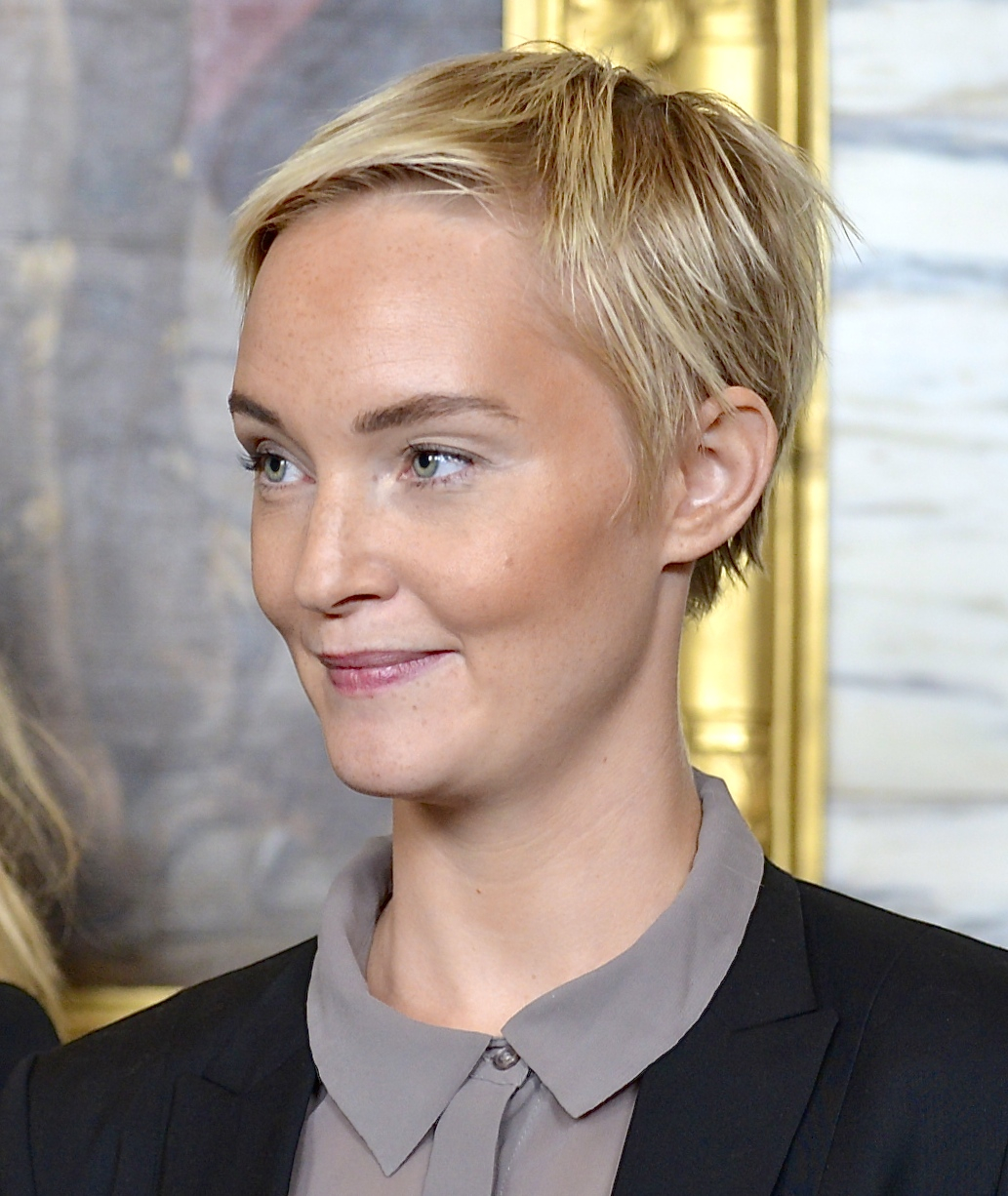
- Pekkari in 2014
- Born: Anna Jeanna Sofia Pekkari; 1 September 1985 (age 41); Gothenburg, Sweden
- Occupation: Actress

Sofia Pekkari (born 1 September 1985) is a Swedish actress.

== Biography ==
Anna Jeanna Sofia Pekkari was born on 1 September 1985 in Gothenburg. Pekkari is a Finnish surname. Her father was a musician employed at the Backa Theatre. While studying theatre at Angered Gymnasium, 17-year-old Pekkari shared the role of Ophelia with Elmira Aslanzadeh in a 2003 production of William Shakespeare's Hamlet at Angereds Teater. She played the role on opening night, opposite Kjell Wilhelmsen. She was then discovered at an audition for Kniven i hjärtat (2004).

Pekkari worked at the Angereds Teater for three years before making her debut at the Royal Dramatic Theatre playing Judith in August Strindberg's Dance of Death. In 2010, she played Juliet in a production of Romeo and Juliet at the main stage of the Royal Dramatic Theatre. She had a main role in the international crime thriller Cold Courage (2020). She played the lead role of Fernando in the musical Kärlek skonar ingen at the Oscarsteatern in 2021. She appeared in the musical Änglagård, also at the Oscarsteatern, in 2023. In December 2025, Pekkari appeared in Pelicoträttegången at the Royal Dramatic Theatre. Directed by Milo Rau, the four-hour documentary production featured reconstructed segments of the high-profile Pelicot rape trial. She joined a large ensemble including Melinda Kinnaman and Sara Stridsberg.

== Acting credits ==
=== Television ===
Year	Title	Role	Notes	Ref.
2004	Kniven i hjärtat			
2006	Möbelhandlarens dotter	Sanna		
2020	Cold Courage	Lia		

=== Theatre ===
Year	Title	Role	Theatre	Notes	Ref.
2003	Hamlet	Ophelia	Angereds Teater		
2010	Romeo and Juliet	Juliet	Royal Dramatic Theatre	Main stage	
2021	Kärlek skonar ingen	Fernando	Oscarsteatern	Musical	
2023	Änglagård	Eva	Oscarsteatern	Musical	
2025	Shame	Eva	Royal Dramatic Theatre	Main stage	
2025	Pelicoträttegången		Royal Dramatic Theatre		
