= The Riddle (film) =

- Directed by: Brendan Foley
- Written by: Brendan Foley
- Produced by: Peter Burrell; Chris Chrisafis; Joe Condren; Brendan Foley; Lars Hermann; Mark Moriarty
- Starring: Vinnie Jones; Derek Jacobi; Vanessa Redgrave; Julie Cox; P. H. Moriarty; Jason Flemyng; Mel Smith
- Cinematography: Mark Moriarty
- Edited by: Ross Bradley
- Music by: Graham Slack
- Production companies: Grosvenor Park Films; Riddle Productions; Manuscript Productions
- Distributed by: The Mail on Sunday
- Release date: 16 September 2007
- Running time: 116 minutes
- Country: United Kingdom
- Language: English

The Riddle is a 2007 British psychological crime thriller film directed and written by Brendan Foley. It stars Vinnie Jones, Derek Jacobi, Julie Cox, Vanessa Redgrave, and Jason Flemyng.

== Plot ==
When a woman is murdered following her discovery of an unpublished Charles Dickens manuscript, an unusual trio team up to investigate. The three are Mike (Jones), an ambitious sports tabloid journalist determined to make a name for himself, Kate (Cox), a police officer, and an eccentric old beach-combing tramp (Jacobi). Together they must track down the mystery and we are taken back to the world of Charles Dickens. Only when they solve the riddle of the manuscript are they able to solve the present day crime, but they must also face opposers: a greedy detective (Moriarty), a publisher (Redgrave), and a ruthless construction company owner (Flemyng).

== Principal cast ==
- Vinnie Jones as Mike Sullivan
- Derek Jacobi as The Tramp / (19th century) Charles Dickens
- Julie Cox as Kate Merril
- Vanessa Redgrave as Roberta Elliot
- Jason Flemyng as Don Roberts
- P. H. Moriarty as D.I. Willis / (19th century) Constable Frederick
- Mel Smith as Professor Cranshaw
- Vera Day as Sadie Miller
- Kenny Lynch as Shotgun Ronnie White
- Gareth Hunt as Roy McBride

== Filming ==
The film was shot in London's Greenwich, Lewisham, Southwark, and Chislehurst Caves in Bromley district. The opening sequence was shot at the Central Park Stadium in Murston.

== Promotion ==
The Riddle was released direct-to-video as a world exclusive premiere promotion on 16 September 2007, and came free inside The Mail on Sunday, which bought the UK DVD rights. The promotional DVD contains a trailer for Bog Bodies, a horror film also directed by Brendan Foley.
