= Cold Courage =

- Genre: Crime drama; Mystery thriller
- Based on: Vilpittömästi sinun by Pekka Hiltunen
- Written by: David Joss Buckley; Brendan Foley
- Directed by: Agneta Fagerström Olsson; Kadir Ferati Balci
- Starring: Pihla Viitala; Sofia Pekkari; John Simm; Arsher Ali; Peter Coonan; Caroline Goodall; Jakob Eklund; Matteo Simoni
- Music by: Lasse Enersen
- Original languages: English, Finnish
- No. of episodes: 8

Production
- Producer: Markku Flink
- Production locations: United Kingdom; Ireland; Belgium; Finland
- Production companies: Luminoir (Finland); Potemkino (Belgium); Vico Films (Ireland); Sagafilm (Iceland)

Original release
- Network: Viaplay
- Release: 3 May 2020

Cold Courage is an international crime drama television series based on Vilpittömästi sinun (2011, in English: Sincerely Yours), which is the first instalment of the Studio book series by Finnish writer Pekka Hiltunen. The book's English translation, Cold Courage, was published in 2013. All eight episodes of the TV series were available on Viaplay from 3 May 2020. It was co-written by David Joss Buckley and Brendan Foley while the directors were Agneta Fagerström Olsson and Kadir Ferati Balci. Most of the series is set in London, with additional scenes in Finland. The main protagonists are two Finnish women living in London: Pihla Viitala as Mari, who leads a clandestine group, The Studio and Sofia Pekkari as Lia, a graphic designer who is recruited by Mari to infiltrate a right wing political party. As well as United Kingdom and Finland, scenes were also shot in Belgium and Ireland.

== Premise ==
Starting from six weeks before a by-election for a Greater London seat, each episode is set about a week later. The series follows the activity of The Studio, a clandestine investigative unit, established in London by Mari. She recruits fellow Finnish woman Lia to monitor the campaign of the right wing Fair Rule party's leader, Arthur. The Studio's other members are Paddy, Maggie, Berg and Rico. Lia is concerned for her friend Nina, who is a sex worker for an abusive crime lord, Vanags. Vanags makes the prostitutes wear amber pendants. When the disfigured corpse of Daiga is found wearing such a pendant, Lia believes it is Nina. Lia helps The Studio expose the fascist links of Fair Rule's deputy leader, Toni. Meanwhile Lia anonymously informs DCI Peter of Daiga's background.

Vanags allows a rich client dubbed the "Monster" to viciously batter the prostitutes including Daiga. Nina's corpse is also found disfigured. Lia and The Studio's team hunt down Vanags's henchman Sean and rescue the remaining prostitutes. Vanags abducts Lia but she is saved by Paddy. Lia shoots and seriously injures Vanags before escaping with Paddy. The Studio finds evidence that Arthur is the "Monster" and attempt to expose his activities. Arthur's party is sponsored by Mari's childhood rivals Jakob and Niclas Gerber.

== Cast and characters ==
=== Main ===
- Pihla Viitala as Mari Rautee: leader of clandestine group, The Studio, initially funded by Mikael. She becomes Paddy's love interest
- Sofia Pekkari as Liaelle "Lia" Matilta: Finnish-born, Swedish-raised, London resident. Graphics designer, initially works for a magazine New Level, while freelancing as an advertisement developer, recruited by Mari to be a mole in Fair Rule
- John Simm as Arthur Fried: leader of Fair Rule party
- Arsher Ali DCI Peter Chandra: leads police squad on disfigured woman's murder case
- Peter Coonan as Paddy: The Studio's lead investigator, former police detective. Becomes Mari's love interest
- Caroline Goodall as Maggie: The Studio's safe house manager
- Jakob Eklund as Berg: The Studio's logistics, props man
- Matteo Simoni as Rico: The Studio's technician

=== Recurring ===
- Antti Reini as Kazimirs Vanags: Latvian drug and prostitution/sex trafficking network boss, all his prostitutes wear amber necklaces, runs Baltic Imports as a supermarket front
- Ian Gerard Whyte as Sean Duffy: Vanags's henchman, scares prostitutes
- Saar de Groof as Yalda: one of Vanags's prostitutes, does their shopping
- Elmer Bäck as Matti: Lia's abusive former boyfriend
- Venetia Bowe as Katya: one of Vanags's prostitutes, Daiga's younger sister, Anya's aunt
- Keith McErlean as DS Jason Briggs: Peter's assistant
- Pääru Oja as David Vervloet: First Rule's press officer, becomes its campaign manager
- Megan O'Kelly as Anya: one of Vanags's prostitutes, Daiga's 12-year-old daughter, Katya's niece
- Toni O'Rourke as Nina: Lia's friend, sex worker, abused by Vanags
- Charlotte Timmers as Annabelle Fried: recently married Arthur
- Maria Doyle Kennedy as Suzanne "Suzie" Hawkins: Arthur's first wife
- David Fawaz as Mohammad Latif: Amjad's father
- Aislín McGuckin as Antonia "Toni" Gallagher: Fair Rule's second-in-charge, allied with facists. Later arrested for colluding in death of young boy, Amjad
- Ryan McParland as Sam: New Level deputy editor, Lia's co-worker
- Derek Ugochukwu as Abu Al Jabar (a.k.a. Trevor Greene): throws brick, which kills Amjad. Killed by police
- Jussi Nikkilä as Aarne: Mari's younger brother, has seizures due to oxygen starvation after childhood hanging
- Rea Mauranen as Mamia: Mari and Aarne's abusive, long-estranged mother, Karl's lover, she favoured Karl's sons over her own children
- Tibo Vandenborre as Jakob Gerber: Karl's son, Niclas's brother, Mari and Aarne's schoolmate bully
- Jack Bandeira as Monty
- Danielle Galligan as Daiga Mednis: one of Vanags's prostitutes, killed, disfigured
- Tony Condren as "Guard (Abused Girls)"/"Henchman": works for Vanags
- Matti Onnismaa as Mikael Rautee: Mari and Aarne's father, retired Finnish goldmine co-owner with Karl
- Paul Rigter as Vong: Lia's neighbour, rent collector for their landlord
- Lucy Cray-Miller as Irene
- Jurgen Delnaet as Nick: New Level worker; fired for sexual exploitation of fellow worker
- Jeroen Perceval as Niclas Gerber: Jakob's brother, Karl's son

== Episodes ==
No.	Title	Directed by	Written by	Original release date
1	"Clean Skin"	Agneta Fagerström Olsson	David Joss Buckley, Brendan Foley	3 May 2020
Online, Lia views Arthur electioneering. She rolls a die and traces map route 2. Mohammed and Amjad walk by the crowd. Arthur introduces Toni and then leaves. David tells Lia that she missed Arthur's speech, she hands David a promo ad. Mari takes Lia's phone. Abu throws brick into crowd, which injures Amjad. Lia arrives at magazine. Paddy identifies the crowd's thugs as fascists. Lia and Sam meet Rico. Mari returns Lia's phone. Mari reveals Nick's secret, but he denies his father's sexual abuse. Rico copies magazine's computer files when Sam displays his office. Nina arranges to meet Lia. Sean selects a prostitute for their special customer. Vanags threatens Nina to behave. Lia runs along a different route, which is cordoned off by police. Peter attends Daiga's disfigured corpse; she wore an amber pendant. Lia leaves card at Daiga's memorial. Mari introduces Lia to The Studio's members. Mari directs Lia's attention to Toni using fascists. Lia reluctantly agrees to be Mari's mole inside Arthur's party. Peter reads Lia's memorial. Nick's fired for his sex video. Lia's frightened by receiving Matti's card via her mother. Lia packs her belongings. Vong thanks her for paying her rent. Aarne has a seizure.
2	"Trojan Horse"	Agneta Fagerström Olsson	David Joss Buckley, Brendan Foley	3 May 2020
Mari relives when she was a child and saved Aarne, who was hanging from a rope. A girl, Charlotte sings a patriotic song at Arthur's fundraiser. Arthur rails against multiculturalism. He blames Amjad's own community for the stoning. Peter's squad members search for Lia. Mari explains why her father's polluting goldmine had been closed down. Lia recalls meeting Nina, putting on an amber necklace; Lia had attacked her clients and ran off. Mari agrees to identify Daiga. Berg describes Arthur's personnel and backers. Paddy colludes with Jason; Paddy collects a tooth from the corpse. Lia lies to Toni about why she joined Fair Rule. Yalda shops for fellow prostitutes. Lia works on Toni's flyer. Rico asks Lia to install malaware on Toni's phone. Sean shoves Anya into room with masked client, "Monster", who assaults her. "Guard" sits outside the room. Matti observes Lia and David drinking at a pub. David considers that Arthur should get rid of Toni. Mikael does not answer Mari's call. In an alley, Matti attacks David. Nina finds Lia; Lia takes her to meet Mari. They all travel to Maggie's home. Mari tells Lia to give Nina's pendant to Berg. Lia visits hospitalised David. Amjad dies.
3	"The Faceless Woman"	Kadir Ferati Balci	David Joss Buckley, Brendan Foley	3 May 2020
Studio members identify Abu, fellow prisoner with a fascist, Andrew. Paddy and Berg learn of Andrew's connection to Toni. Lia sets off fire alarm, to place wifi device in Toni's office. Sean roughs up another prostitute. Nina tells Maggie that Vanags will find her. Toni uses a second phone. Paddy teaches Lia to pick locks. Maggie informs The Studio of Nina talking to Katya about Vanags. David catches Lia trying to break into Toni's office. Lia says she's looking for evidence linking Toni to thugs who attacked him. David unlocks Toni's door; Lia opens Toni's drawer and bugs Toni's second phone. Lia updates Mari on David. Matti claims he wants forgiveness; Lia leaves him at a bar. Abu, wanted for Amjad's death, has been shot dead by police. Andrew confronts Toni, who takes him into her office. Mari orders Lia to follow the pair outside. Lia records Toni paying Andrew. Toni brings Lia before Arthur, who queries her New Level links. Lia explains she's only a designer, not a writer. Berg discovers Arthur's previous marriage to Suzie. Mari buys an amber pendant at Vanags's store. Rico tells Mari that her father's goldmine has been reopened. Mikael samples nearby water.
4	"A King from the East"	Kadir Ferati Balci	David Joss Buckley, Brendan Foley	3 May 2020
Arthur addresses a meeting when a journalist cites video of Toni's exchange with Andrew. Lia phones Peter, using Rico's voice and location scrambler. Lia uses a client to evade Sean and "Guard" at Vanags's bar. Paddy grabs her while she runs away. Paddy and Lia follow Vanags. Nina contacts Yalda at a grocery store. Nina conspires to save Anya. Mari learns that Mikael's been hospitalised. Lia tells Arthur that she saw no one filming Toni. Lia accepts Arthur's invitation to attend a backer's conference. Arthur expels Toni from his party upon her arrest. At Kainuu hospital, Mari has a frosty exchange with Mamie, who's divorcing Mikael and selling his assets. Lia meets Annabelle and Arthur's backers Jakob and Niclas. Later Lia records Suzie's description of Arthur's abusive behaviour. Peter and Jason suspect Vanags of Daiga's death. Vong alerts Lia to Matti's nearby presence. Lia gives Nina money. Nina describes Daiga running from an abusive client, "Monster", who nearly killed her. Vanags killed Daiga in front of the other prostitutes and then disfigured her. Berg informs Mari that Arthur was cleared of involvement in Toni's plot. Mikael flatlines. Nina helps Anya escape but Vanags catches them.
5	"My Father's House"	Kadir Ferati Balci	David Joss Buckley, Brendan Foley	3 May 2020
Mari and Lia attend Mikael's funeral. Mari challenges Mamia over a service for her atheist father but no autopsy. Mari was homeschooled by Mamia with Aarne and the Gerber brothers. The Gerbers tricked Aarne into hanging himself. Paddy reports Nina's death but Mari does not tell Lia. Mohammed and his imam join Arthur's call for peace. Arthur touts his law and order approach. Studio members videotape Suzie, who details beatings by Arthur. Due to Mikael's death the Studio loses their major funding. Vong sees Matti exiting Lia's apartment. Lia follows "Guard" taking Yalda shopping. Yalda informs Lia that Anya returned but Nina did not. Lia identifies Daiga to Peter and learns of second corpse. Mari releases Suzie's video without authorisation. Peter announces Daiga's details. Sean orders Yalda to clean up Anya after her beating by "Monster". Lia gives Yalda a phone. Mari agrees to rescue the remaining prostitutes. "Guard" grabs Yalda. Yalda is in intensive care; nurse phones Lia. Paddy leads team, pretending to be immigration control, into brothel. They tie-up Sean, leave him for police but rescue the women. Paddy takes Lia to Yalda's hospital to recover the Studio's phone. Paddy's attacked, Vanags grabs Lia.
6	"Stench of Death"	Agneta Fagerström Olsson	David Joss Buckley, Brendan Foley	3 May 2020
Mari and Berg cannot contact Lia or Paddy. Vanags is about to kill Lia when Paddy tackles him. As they struggle Lia picks up Vanags's gun and shoots Vanags. Lia calls emergency services; leaves Vanags's phone. Paddy and Lia drive off. Mari finds that Suzie's gone. Paddy updates team on Lia and Vanags. Vong looks after Lia. Peter's team monitor Vanags in surgery, analyse Lia's call and search for Vanags's van. Mari and Paddy have sex. Vong warns off Matti with a bat. Peter interrogates Sean. Lia wakes from nightmare of Matti. Vong settles Lia. Mari updates Lia as Arthur's campaign gathers support. Maggie brings women to visit Yalda. Lia returns to work for Arthur. He complains about Anabelle and offers Lia to take Toni's position. Anabelle explains her broken arm as a riding accident. Paddy removes Katya after she threatens Vanags with acid but pours water on his face. Rico erases Katya and Paddy from hospital's CCTV. Mari explains how Aarne was bullied and drugged by Mamie. The Gerber brothers tricked Aarne into hanging himself, saying they would rescue him. Mari saved Aarne herself. Matti claims he's changed and that Lia needs him to protect her. Lia rejects him.
7	"Mari Says Hi"	Agneta Fagerström Olsson	David Joss Buckley, Brendan Foley	3 May 2020
Lia updates Mari on Arthur's job offer. Mari counters that Lia's a member of the Studio. Arthur promises victory to his campaign team. The Gerbers meet Arthur, they are worried by Annabelle's broken arm. They consider increasing funding his party. Peter's team determine Vanags was not shot by Sean. Peter interviews Lia regarding Vanags's shooting. Matti accosts Paddy, when he picks up Lia's bag. Lia relates how she repeatedly hid from Matti but he always found her. Mari vows to protect Lia. Suzie's been attacked by David and paid off. Aarne panics because his tape player broke down. Election day begins, Arthur declares the video to be a fake. Lia argues with Mari over the video's release. Arthur wins his election. Mari sees Arthur congratulated by the Gerbers. Mohammed accuses Arthur of hiring Abu, who killed Amjad. Arthur leaves. Paddy delivers women to truck driver, who will drive them to Sweden. Lia joins Arthur's celebrations. Arthur recognises Mari from their affair in Brussels, seven years earlier. Mari orders Arthur to resign for abusing her but he calls her bluff and starts choking her. She retaliates, hurts Arthur and gives a hello to his bosses. Yalda identifies the "Monster" as Arthur.
8	"Said the Spider to the Fly"	Agneta Fagerström Olsson	David Joss Buckley, Brendan Foley	3 May 2020
Mohammed's stabbed by thugs at Amjad's memorial. Lia and Mari work on bringing down Arthur. Yalda describes "Monster" as almost killing Daiga, who was murdered by Vanags. "Monster's" voice matches Arthur. Gerbers want no disruption to their conference with other politicians. Mari asks Berg to fix Aarne's tape player. Lia discovers Suzie hanging from rafters. Berg finds Mikael's water sample, which is contaminated with cyanide. Paddy determines Suzie was killed to keep her quiet. Arthur announces Suzie's death as suicide. Lia evades Peter's queries about her connection with Vanags. Paddy finds Vanags was killed and disfigured. Matti returns to Lia's flat, steals her underwear. The Studio hires adjoining rooms for Lia's date with Arthur and monitor him via her pendant's camera. Arthur admits to knowing Toni's plan. He strikes Lia for lying about Toni's spycam. Mari and team follow Arthur and Lia to meet Gerbers. Gerbers show Arthur that Lia works for Mari and reveal Lia's pendant. Mari rescues Lia from Gerbers and Arthur. Lia leaves Mari and her team. Arthur's driver slices his throat from behind. Peter announces that Mohammed's arrested for Arthur's murder. David becomes Fair Rule's leader. Jakob tells Mari that Arthur's voice was faked to fool Yalda.

== Production ==
In May 2017, it was announced Viaplay and Sagafilm had picked up the Studio series, the first book titled, Vilpittömästi sinun (2011), by Pekka Hiltunen (translated into English as Cold Courage in 2013). Luminoir's Markku Flink would produce, and David Joss Buckley and Brendan Foley would adapt the story for screen. The series is internationally co-produced by Finnish, Irish, Belgian, and Icelandic production companies Luminoir, Vico Films, Potemkino, and Sagafilm respectively.

Casting was announced in January 2019 as principal photography for the series began, taking place in London, Dublin, Antwerp, Helsinki, and Kainuu.

== Release ==
A trailer was released on 6 April 2020. The series was available in Nordic countries on Viaplay on 3 May 2020.

Global Road Entertainment originally had the rights to distribute the series internationally before withdrawing; Lionsgate now distributes internationally.

In August 2020, it was announced the series would premiere on BritBox in the UK on 3 September. Cold Courage premiered on AMC+ in the United States on 11 March 2021.
