= Brendan Foley (filmmaker) =

Northern Irish writer, film producer and director

Brendan Foley is a Northern Irish writer, film producer and director. Raised in Belfast, Northern Ireland, he has written feature film and TV series scripts for producers and studios in UK, Ireland, Hollywood, Canada, Denmark, Finland, Poland, South Africa, China and Thailand.

His most recent work includes Sherlock & Daughter a hit series for CW, HBO Max, WB Discovery and SBS Australia which he created and executive produced. Previously he wrote on Cold Courage, a TV series thriller for Lionsgate, Viaplay and Luminoir shot in Europe in 2019 and two seasons of The Man Who Diedfor Nordic streamer Elisa and SBS.

He wrote and produced the 2005 action-thriller Johnny Was, starring Vinnie Jones, Eriq La Salle and Patrick Bergin. The film won awards including Audience Awards and Best Feature Awards from six film festivals.

== Career ==
He wrote, produced and directed The Riddle in 2006, starring Jones, Sir Derek Jacobi and Vanessa Redgrave. In September 2007, The Riddle became the world's first feature film to be released as a DVD premiere by a national newspaper. The UK's Mail on Sunday bought UK DVD rights and distributed 2.6 million copies, making the film one of the most widely watched independent films in the UK.

During 2006–07, Foley wrote and directed Assault of Darkness, a satirical horror film set in rural Ireland, starring Jones, Jason Barry and Nora Jane Noone. It was released by Lionsgate in the US on DVD in 2009. Foley co-created and was a writer on Shelldon, a children's environmental animated TV series on NBC (2010–12) and Byrdland (five seasons of animated TV series in Asia with GMM Grammy).

Cold Courage, described as a Nordic Noir series involving Finnish characters in present-day London made by Finnish producers Luminoir for Lionsgate and Viaplay, shot in London, Dublin, Belgium and Finland in 2019. Actor John Simm told Variety that he was attracted to the series by the quality of the writing and the fact that it was a pan-European thriller.

In 2025 he was Writer-Creator and Exec Producer for Sherlock & Daughter, a drama series starring David Thewlis and Blu Hunt for The CW, WarnerBrosDiscovery UK, Federation, Starlings and StoryFirst (UK).

=== Unproduced work ===
In 2015, Foley started developing a new TV detective series for BBC TV, Farmoor (makers of The Fall) and Northern Ireland Screen (UK home of Game of Thrones) and, in 2016, he developed Tunnel Kings, a mini-series on World War II POW ‘escape-artists’ for CBC and Dream Street, Canada. Foley completed pilot scripts for SOS, a new eco-thriller series by Finnish producers Luminoir, and Kvenland, set in the Dark Ages. Previously he wrote the pilot for drama Dr Feelgood for Monday TV (Denmark).

In 2019, Foley was attached to produce an adaptation of Freeman Wills Crofts' Inspector French novels.

=== Books ===
Foley has written books for US and UK publishers. Under The Wire, a World War II POW escape drama, which he wrote along with its subject, pilot William Ash, was published by Random House, London and St Martin's Press, New York in 2005 and 2006. It became a best-seller, reaching number one on Amazon UK's history and biography charts. In 2018/19 a related TV series was developed as a future miniseries by CBC in Canada and Northern Ireland Screen.

Foley's next book, Archerfield, a novel, published in 2015, covers 16,000 years of history in one square mile of Scotland.

== Other ==
He is a member of the Writers Guild (GB), a Fellow of the British Association of Communicators in Business, and was made an honorary life member of the National Union of Journalists in June 2006.

== Filmography ==
Film

Year	Title	Credited as			
Year	Title	Director	Writer	Producer	Notes
2006	Johnny Was	No	Yes	Yes	Executive producer
2007	The Riddle	Yes	Yes	Yes	
2009	Assault of Darkness	Yes	Yes	Yes	

Television

Year	Title	Credited as		
Year	Title	Writer	Producer	Notes
2009-2010	Shelldon	Yes	No	78 episodes
2011	Flying with Byrd	Yes	Yes	5 episodes
2020	Cold Courage	Yes	Yes	Story editor, 8 episodes
2022	The Man Who Died	Yes	No	12 episodes
2025	Sherlock & Daughter †	Yes	Yes	Creator, executive producer
