= Julie Cox =

English actress

- Born: 24 April 1973 (age 53); Ely, England, UK
- Occupation: Actress
- Years active: 1994–present
- Children: 1

Julie Cox (born 24 April 1973) is an English actress. She played Princess Irulan in the Sci Fi Channel's 2000 miniseries Frank Herbert's Dune and its 2003 sequel, Frank Herbert's Children of Dune. She also played The Childlike Empress in The Neverending Story III.

== Career ==
One of Cox's earliest roles was the Childlike Empress in the 1994 film The NeverEnding Story III. She played Diana, Princess of Wales in Princess in Love by David Greene, a film released in 1996 based upon the publication by Anna Pasternak. Cox played the character Sophie Aronnax in 20,000 Leagues Under the Sea in 1997, and in 1999 she appeared as Giulietta in the film adaptation of Alegría.

Cox portrayed Princess Irulan in the 2000 Sci Fi Channel miniseries Frank Herbert's Dune and its 2003 sequel, Frank Herbert's Children of Dune.

Cox starred with Jean-Claude Van Damme in Second in Command (2006), and in 2007 was the female lead in The Riddle. She starred as Beth Eagleton in The Oxford Murders in 2008.

Cox portrayed a fictionalised Mary Shelley, a companion of the Eighth Doctor, in the Big Finish Productions Doctor Who audio dramas The Company of Friends (2009), The Silver Turk (2011), The Witch from the Well (2011), and Army of Death (2011).

== Personal life ==
Cox lives in Bristol with her partner and they have one child.

== Filmography ==
=== Film ===
Year	Title	Role	Notes
1994	The NeverEnding Story III	The Childlike Empress	
1994	The Knickerbocker Gang: The Talking Grave	Melissa Kramer	
1998	Brand New World	Angela	AKA, Woundings
1999	Alegría	Giulietta	
1999	Felicia's Journey	Marcia Tibbits	
2001	The War Bride	Sophie	
2003	The Death of Klinghoffer	Young Hannah	
2005	The Headsman	Margaretha	
2006	Second in Command	Michelle Whitman	Video
2006	Almost Heaven	Hilary Wooler	
2007	The Riddle	Kate Merrill	
2008	The Oxford Murders	Beth Eagleton	
2012	The Prisoner	Julia	
2018	2036 Origin Unknown	Lena Wilson	

=== Television ===
Year	Title	Role	Notes
1992	Une maman dans la ville	Betsy	TV film
1995	Tears Before Bedtime	Katherine	TV series
1995	Zoya	Maria	TV film
1995	La vie de Marianne	Mademoiselle Varthon	TV film
1996	Tales from the Crypt	Marlys	"Last Respects"
1996	Princess in Love	Princess Diana	TV film
1996	The Ring	Giselle	TV film
1997	20,000 Leagues Under the Sea	Sophie Arronax	TV film
1999	The Scarlet Pimpernel	Helene de Rochambeau	"Valentin Gautier"
2000	Frank Herbert's Dune	Princess Irulan	TV miniseries
2000	David Copperfield	Dora Spenlow	TV film
2002	King of Texas	Claudia Lear	TV film
2002	The American Embassy	Fiona Humphrey	Episode: "Long Live the King"
2002	An Angel for May	Alison Wheeler	TV film
2003	Frank Herbert's Children of Dune	Princess Irulan	TV miniseries
2003	Spooks	Maxi Baxter	Episode: “Blood & Money” Broadcast in some countries as MI-5
2003	Byron	Annabella Milbanke	TV film
2003	Agatha Christie's Poirot	Elsa Greer	Episode: "Five Little Pigs"
2004	Agatha Christie's Marple	Young Miss Marple	Episode: "The Murder at the Vicarage"
2006	Nostradamus	Gemelle	TV film
2007	HolbyBlue	Mandy French	Recurring role (series 1)
2008	New Tricks	Jacinta Felspar	Episode: "Couldn't Organise One"
2011	Zen	Mara	Episode: "Cabal"
2012	Lewis	Miranda Thornton	Episode: "Generation of Vipers"
2013	Midsomer Murders	Olivia Carr	Episode: "The Sicilian Defence"
2013	Jo	Sharon	Episode: "Le Marais"
2017	Broadchurch	Angela Dyer	Episode #3.1
