= 20,000 Leagues Under the Sea (1997 film) =

- Print advertisement
- Genre: Adventure; Fantasy; Romance
- Based on: Twenty Thousand Leagues Under the Seas by Jules Verne
- Teleplay by: Joe Wiesenfeld
- Directed by: Michael Anderson
- Starring: Richard Crenna; Ben Cross; Paul Gross; Julie Cox
- Music by: John Scott
- Country of origin: United States
- Original language: English

Production
- Executive producer: Robert Halmi Sr.
- Producer: John Davis
- Production locations: Pinewood Studios, Iver Heath, Buckinghamshire, England; Red Sea, Israel
- Cinematography: Alan Hume
- Editor: Jason Krasucki
- Running time: 95 minutes
- Production companies: Hallmark Entertainment; RHI Entertainment
- Budget: $15,000,000 (estimated)

Original release
- Network: CBS
- Release: March 23, 1997

20,000 Leagues Under the Sea is a 1997 television film directed by Michael Anderson and starring Ben Cross as Captain Nemo. It premiered on March 23, 1997. Based on the 1870 novel Twenty Thousand Leagues Under the Seas by Jules Verne, it is most notable for replacing the character of Professor Aronnax's manservant, Conseil, with the Professor's daughter, Sophie, who disguises herself as a boy so that she may accompany her father aboard USS Abraham Lincoln; she becomes the apex of a love triangle involving Captain Nemo and Ned the harpooner. The film was produced by Hallmark Entertainment.

== Cast and characters ==
- Richard Crenna as Professor Aronnax
- Ben Cross as Captain Nemo
- Paul Gross as Ned Land
- Julie Cox as Sophie Aronnax
- Michael Jayston as Admiral John E. Sellings
- Jeff Harding as Captain Michael Farragut

== Production ==
Executive producer Robert Halmi Sr. said that he wanted the film to be more positive than the original novel in order to make it more accessible to children.

== Critical reception ==
The film was generally poorly received.

Variety described the film as being "not quite that bad". They praised the film's photography and said that film's special effects "almost made the film worth watching."

The Washington Post described the film as being "the next worse thing" to the seasonal flu. The film was criticized for lacking a sense of adventure or action. Richard Crenna and Ben Cross were both described as being miscast in their roles, and the replacement Professor Aronnax with his feminist daughter in the story was also criticized as being transparent and forced. The film's special effects were also criticized.

== See also ==
- List of underwater science fiction works
