= Sheamus =

Irish professional wrestler (born 1978)

- Sheamus in 2026

Personal information
- Born: Stephen Farrelly; 28 January 1978 (age 48) Dublin, Ireland
- Spouse: Isabella Revilla (m. 2022)

Professional wrestling career
- Ring name(s): Galldubh; King Sheamus; Sheamus; Sheamus O'Shaunessy; Stephen Farrelly
- Billed height: 6 ft 3 in (191 cm)
- Billed weight: 267 lb (121 kg)
- Billed from: 3000 BC; Dublin, Ireland
- Trained by: Larry Sharpe; Mark Starr; Jim Molineaux; Irish Whip Wrestling
- Debut: May 2002

Stephen Farrelly (born 28 January 1978) is an Irish professional wrestler. He is best known for his time in WWE from 2006 to 2026, where he performed under the ring name Sheamus.

Farrelly began his professional wrestling career in 2002 on the European independent circuit. He signed with WWE in 2006 as part of their developmental territory Florida Championship Wrestling (FCW). He became part of WWE's main roster in 2009, where he would become a four-time world champion, having held the WWE Championship three times and WWE's World Heavyweight Championship once, making him the first Irish world champion in WWE history. He also held the United States Champion three times, and is also a five-time tag team champion (four times for Raw, once for SmackDown) with his tag team partner Cesaro. In addition to these championships, he also won the 2010 King of the Ring tournament, the 2012 Royal Rumble match, and the 2015 Money in the Bank ladder match, making him the second wrestler (after Edge) to achieve all three accomplishments.

Outside of wrestling, he also runs a fitness YouTube channel called Celtic Warrior Workouts and has made multiple appearances in film and television.

== Early life ==
Stephen Farrelly was born on 28 January 1978, in the Cabra suburb of Dublin. He was raised on North Great George's Street in Dublin. He speaks Irish fluently, having attended Scoil Caoimhin Primary and the Gaelscoil Coláiste Mhuire Secondary School. During his school years, he sang in the Palestrina Choir until the age of 13; during this time, he appeared on the Irish shows The Late Late Show and Live at 3. He played Gaelic football for the Erin's Isle club, where he was once proclaimed "sports star of the month". He also played rugby union for the National College of Ireland, where he gained a National Diploma. He is a former IT technician, and also worked as security for a nightclub, which led to him occasionally working as a bodyguard for Bono and Larry Mullen Jr. of U2, as well as actress Denise van Outen.

== Professional wrestling career ==
=== Early career (2002–2004) ===
Farrelly was inspired to become a professional wrestler by watching British wrestling on World of Sport and American wrestling via the WWF. Following advice given to him by Bret Hart, he began training at Larry Sharpe's Monster Factory wrestling school in April 2002, alongside Tank Toland and Cliff Compton. Six weeks later, he officially debuted as a fan favorite against Robert Pigeon under the name Sheamus O'Shaunessy. After hitting an opponent in the groin, he gained the nickname of the "Irish Curse" (a reference to a slang term supposedly denoting a man's inability to perform sexually after consuming an excessive amount of whiskey). He soon suffered a serious neck injury after botching a hip toss, sidetracking his career for two years.

Farrelly developed his wrestling character by drawing on Celtic mythology, moving away from Irish stereotypes of lucky charms, leprechauns, and alcoholism while aiming to portray a fiann, a type of mythical Irish warrior. Having attended an Irish-speaking school, he was aware of the four cycles of Irish mythology and, inspired by the artwork of Jim Fitzpatrick, incorporated sword- and axe-wielding imagery into his gimmick. This included the design of his own pendant, the crossos, which combines the Celtic cross with a Celtic War sword to illustrate his character's "indigenous origins with a hybrid of warrior strength matched with a strong ethical centre".

=== Irish Whip Wrestling (2004–2006) ===
In May 2004, still using the ring name Sheamus O'Shaunessy, Farrelly returned to wrestling at the newly opened Irish Whip Wrestling (IWW) school in Dublin. He then made his debut match for the promotion at their Mount Temple show on 9 July, facing Mark Burns in a winning effort. He went on to win a battle royal the following month.

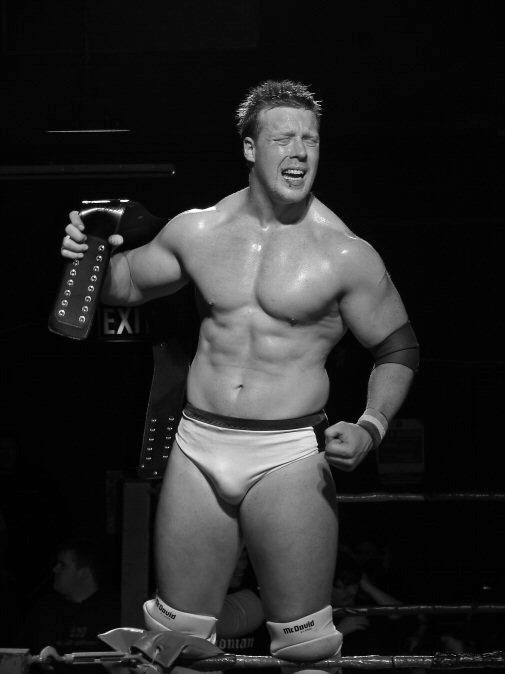
Sheamus O'Shaunessy after retaining the IWW International Heavyweight Championship in November 2005

O'Shaunessy spent the rest of the year engaged in a rivalry with Vid Vain after losing to his tag team partner, Joey Cabray, the same night he won the battle royal. On 22 and 23 October they traded wins, leading to O'Shaunessy recruiting help from CJ Summers to help defeat the tag team on 24 October. O'Shaunessy was still unsuccessful in defeating Vain in singles action the following day. Despite these losses, his impressive showings earned him a place against Alex Shane in a guest match for the Frontier Wrestling Alliance (FWA) British Heavyweight Championship. Although he put on a proficient exhibit and came close to win, his friend Red Vinny interfered in the match and cost him the championship.

In March 2005, he avenged this loss by teaming with Raven to defeat Shane and Vinny. This victory was part of a winning streak over the end of March where O'Shaunessy wrestled twice a day on 24, 25, 26 – including an 11-man Rumble win – and 27 March with a standard tag match and a ten-man tag team match. This series of victories, aside from one loss by disqualification to Vain, put him to a good form for the one-day tournament held in County Kildare to crown the inaugural IWW International Heavyweight Champion. On 28 March, O'Shaunessy put an end to his main rivalries when he defeated Vinny and then Vain in the quarter and semi-finals, respectively. He met Darren Burridge in the final match and won to become IWW's first champion, but had to compete again in an evening show in Dublin, defeating Burridge and Vinny once more in a tag match alongside Vain.

O'Shaunessy's first successful title defence came against Burridge the following month but Burridge would not let his grudge rest, continuing to attack O'Shaunessy and finally costing him the title during a match against D'Lo Brown on 29 May. O'Shaunessy earned revenge in July by defeating Burridge in a grudge match, though lost to him in an arm wrestling contest the following day. Still, he continued on his quest to regain the title by winning a contendership three-way match against Vinny and Red Viper in August setting him up to regain the International Heavyweight Championship in October from Brown in Newcastle upon Tyne in England.

After defending his title against Vampiro and Viper, O'Shaunessy found himself embroiled in a new feud with rising Scottish wrestling star "Thee" Drew Galloway, whom he later admitted was his toughest opponent. On 28 January 2006, he received his first championship match, evolving their rivalry from previous non-title contests. The rivalry quickly took on a patriotic flavour, with Galloway's blue colours of Scotland clashing O'Shaunnesy's green colours of Ireland, mirroring the Old Firm football derby between Rangers and Celtic, respectively. This football allusion became particularly prominent when the two met again at Verona Football Club again for the title, though the match changed into a Lumberjack match, the result and champion remained the same.

With Galloway defeated, O'Shaunessy continued to dominate by again defending his title against Vampiro on 17 March. Galloway earned himself a two out of three falls match against the champion the following day, however, which O'Shaunessy won two falls to one; the next day produced the same result in a match O'Shaunessy claimed was his best on the independent circuit. With Galloway briefly answered, O'Shaunessy took on the newcomer Pierre Marcaeu and defeated him in two successive title matches only to find Galloway had earned another shot. With their rivalry intensifying, Galloway's next challenge to O'Shaunessy was given the stipulation of a Last Man Standing match. O'Shaunessy retained the title, as he also did in June with the same stipulation. Finally, on 28 August, O'Shaunessy lost the IWW International Heavyweight Championship in a singles match to Galloway in what would be his last appearance with the promotion.

=== British independent circuit (2005–2007) ===
As well as wrestling in Ireland, O'Shaunessy occasionally traveled to Great Britain to make appearances on the British independent circuit. In April 2006, he was brought into Wales' Celtic Wrestling promotion as a contender for their top title but was defeated by the champion, Chris Recall. Later that year in November, he was employed by London's LDN Wrestling to appear on their Capital TV show where, after quickly defeating William Hill, he gained an LDN Championship match against Tex Benedict which ended with Benedict winning by disqualification and O'Shaunessy attacking him after the match.

During his time overseas, he worked for Brian Dixon's All Star Wrestling, which gave him a taste of large audiences that he had not experienced in Ireland, as well as wrestling English veteran Robbie Brookside and other British wrestlers, including Nigel McGuinness and Doug Williams. He also represented the UK in a Battle of the Nations tag team match between the UK and Austria alongside Drew McDonald and The Celtic Warrior in a losing effort against Chris Raaber, Michael Kovac, and Robert Ray Kreuzer at the European Wrestling Association's Night of Gladiators.

As well as making top contender appearances based on his growing reputation, O'Shaunessy also brought with him to Britain his long-standing rivalry with Drew Galloway. He had already wrestled in Galloway's home promotion, British Championship Wrestling (BCW), twice in 2005, losing to Jay Phoenix on the day before Phoenix lost to Galloway in March, and returning in September to defeat one of BCW's top stars, Wolfgang, via countout. In the middle of their IWW feud the following year, O'Shaunessy went back to Scotland to take part in BCW's Path To Glory tour, defeating Galloway on the first night but conceding a loss to him the next night in May. Though their feud finished in Ireland in August 2006, it continued on across the Irish Sea when the two wrestled for the umbrella promotion Real Quality Wrestling (RQW) the following year. The two first met during April's Taking On The World show, which ended in a double countout. The lack of a decision led to a rematch in June, and one of O'Shaunessy's last on the independent circuit, where Galloway picked up the victory in a No Holds Barred match ahead of an RQW Heavyweight Championship match.

=== World Wrestling Entertainment/WWE (2006–2026) ===
==== Early appearances (2006–2007) ====
On 13 November 2006, O'Shaunessy and English wrestler Stu Sanders appeared on the World Wrestling Entertainment (WWE) show Raw at the Manchester Evening News Arena, as part of the security team ejecting D-Generation X (DX) from ringside, only for O'Shaunessy to later receive a Pedigree from Triple H. The following day, he and Drew Galloway had a tryout match against each other. In April 2007, he received another set of tryout matches in Milan and London against Galloway, as well as Sanders, WWE talent Jimmy Wang Yang, and Monster Factory alumnus Domino. This led to an offer and signing of a developmental contract with WWE, at which point he relocated to the United States.

==== Florida Championship Wrestling (2007–2008) ====
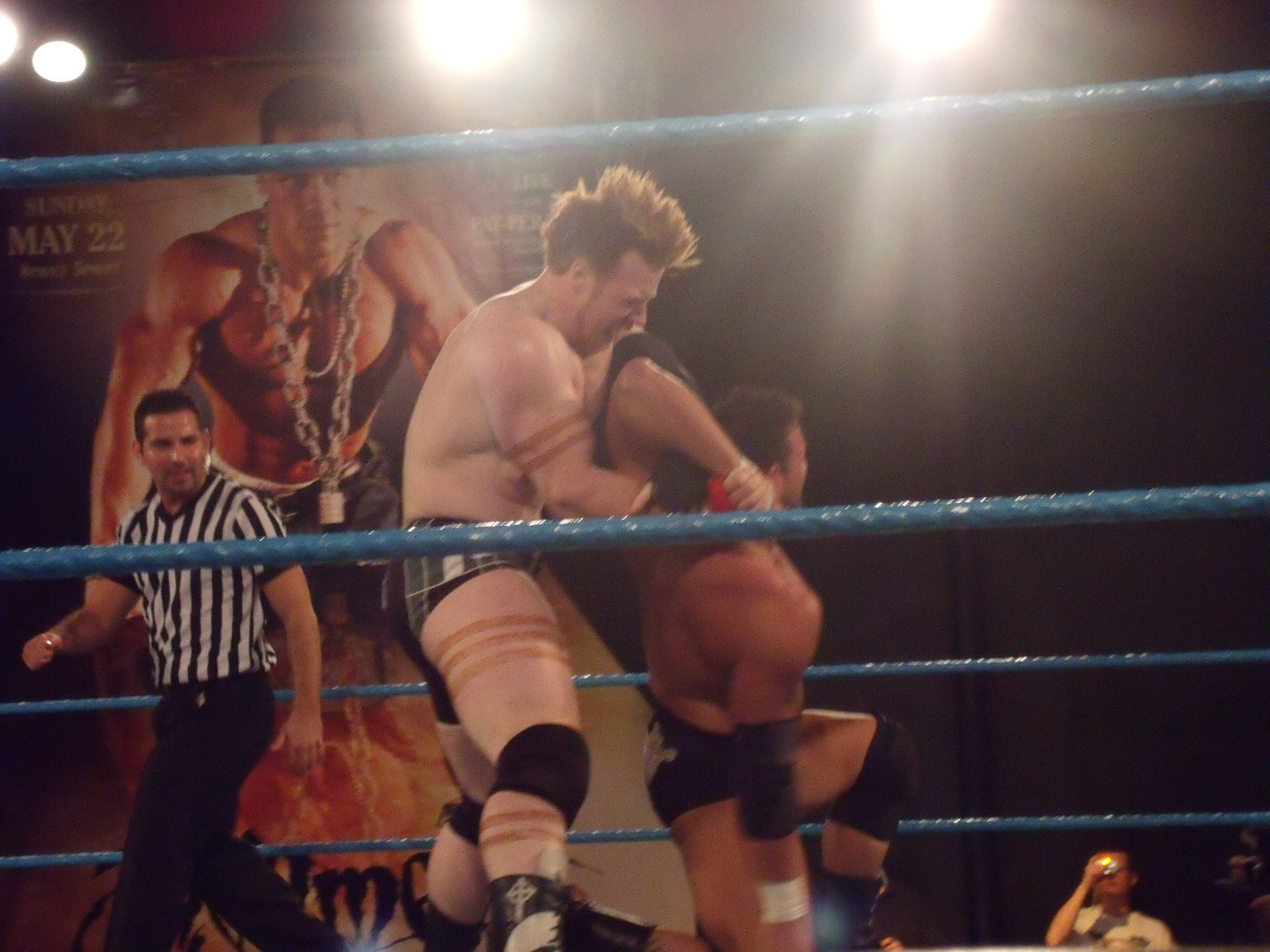
Sheamus lost the Florida Heavyweight Championship to Eric Escobar, who is seen here in an armbar.

O'Shaunessy debuted for the WWE developmental territory Florida Championship Wrestling (FCW) on 2 October in a double-debut match with a win over Bryan Kelly. While wrestling regularly, he was not part of any long feuds but did wrestle with several short-term tag teams alongside Hade Vansen and Jake Hager before teaming with Kafu (and managed by Dave Taylor) in the tournament to crown the inaugural FCW Florida Tag Team Champions. They advanced past the first round after defeating The British Lions ("Thee Superstar" Christopher Gray and "The Rascal" Tommy Taylor), but lost to Brad Allen and Nick Nemeth in the second round.

By September, O'Shaunessy had focused his attention on singles competition and wrestled his way to the top of the card, successfully defeating former partner Hager for the Florida Heavyweight Championship. He defended the title against Hager on 23 October and took on several competitors, with Eric Escobar and Joe Hennig consistently earning themselves into contention. Eventually, on 11 December, O'Shaunessy lost the title to Escobar in a four-way match also involving Hennig and Drew McIntyre (formerly Drew Galloway).

O'Shaunessy spent 2009 continuing to chase gold, earning two shots in January and February at the Florida Tag Team Champions Johnny Curtis and Tyler Reks, but he and Ryback were unsuccessful in both attempts. In March, he challenged the two for the titles again, this time with McIntyre as his partner, but could not defeat them, nor could he defeat McIntyre for the Florida Heavyweight Championship the following month. He received a series of chances throughout the rest of the year, but could not win any more titles before being called up to WWE television, unsuccessfully challenging Justin Angel for the Florida Heavyweight Championship in November.

On 22 July 2008, O'Shaunessy worked a dark match at a SmackDown taping, losing to R-Truth. The following year in May, O'Shaunessy began appearing at the Raw brand's house shows, and on both 8 and 9 May, he defeated Jamie Noble, along with another dark match victory over Noble before an episode of Raw.

==== WWE Champion (2009–2010) ====
On the 30 June 2009 episode of ECW, Farrelly made his unannounced debut as a villain under the shortened ring name of Sheamus, quickly defeating local competitor Oliver John. Sheamus soon entered into a critically well-received rivalry with Goldust after defeating him on 29 July. After exchanging victories in the following weeks they competed in a no disqualification match on 1 September which was won by Sheamus. Sheamus then began a feud with Shelton Benjamin which was hot-shot into a deciding match on 27 October which Sheamus won.

His rivalry with Benjamin ended prematurely when Sheamus was moved to the Raw brand. He made his Raw debut by defeating Jamie Noble on 26 October. In the following weeks, he continued to attack Noble causing him to retire, and, in lieu of competition, assaulted the timekeeper and commentator Jerry Lawler on 16 November. The following week Sheamus appeared on his first WWE pay-per-view event, Survivor Series, on 22 November, when he was part of The Miz's team in a traditional five-on-five elimination tag team match. He eliminated fellow Irishman Finlay and made the final pinfall to eliminate the opposing captain John Morrison and survive along with The Miz and longtime former rival Drew McIntyre.

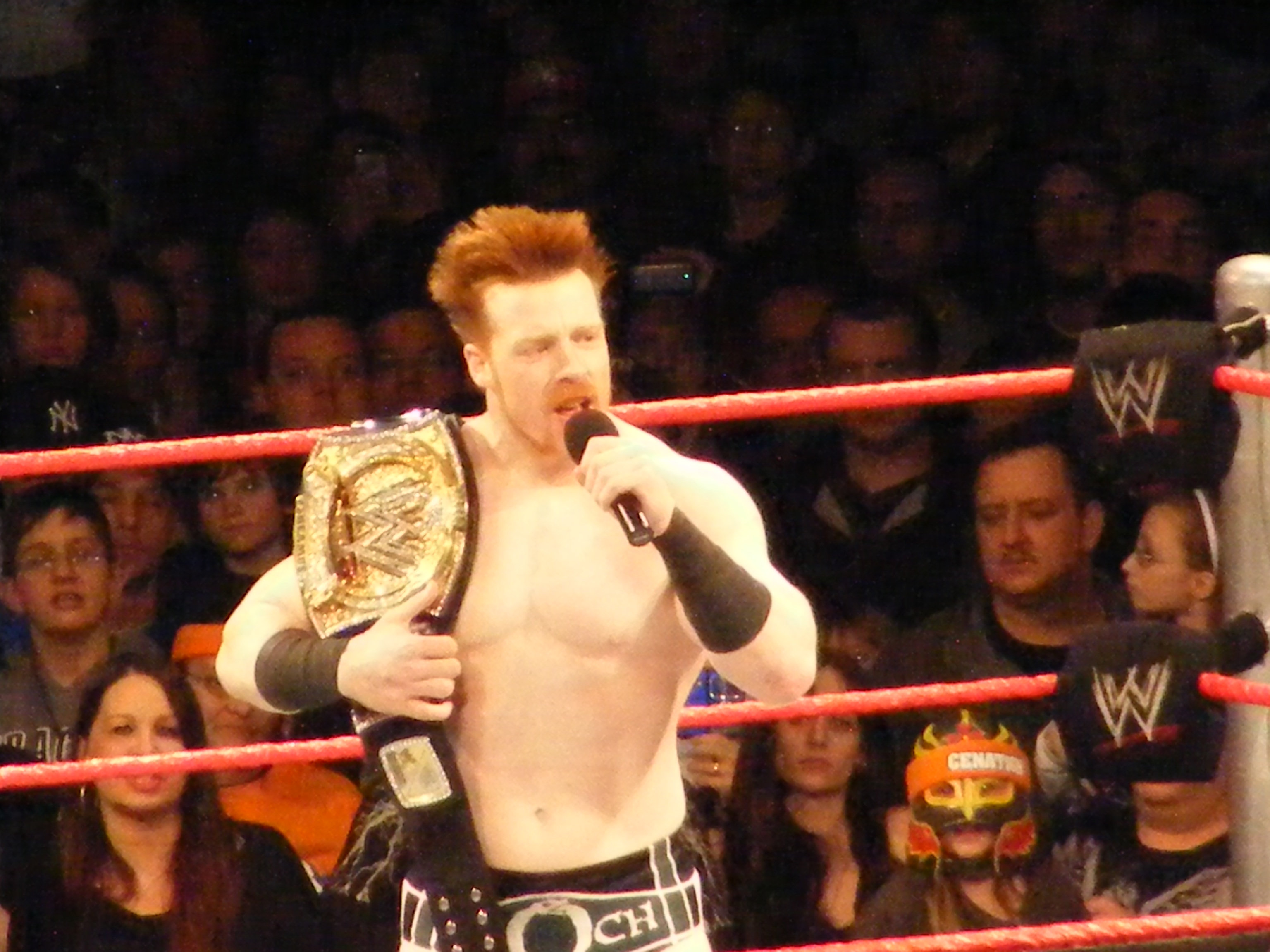
Sheamus as the WWE Champion in December 2009

The following night on Raw, Sheamus won a "break-through" battle royal for wrestlers who had never won a world championship, to become the number one contender to John Cena's WWE Championship. At the contract signing immediately afterward, Sheamus put Cena through the table, and the Raw guest host, Jesse Ventura, announced it would be a Tables match. On 13 December at the TLC: Tables, Ladders and Chairs pay-per-view, Sheamus defeated Cena to win the WWE Championship, his first championship in WWE, making him the first Irish-born WWE Champion. He also captured the major title in just 166 days since his WWE debut, making it the third shortest time to capture a title since his WWE/ECW debut. The following night on Raw, Sheamus was awarded the 2009 Breakout Superstar of the Year Slammy Award. He would make his first title defense on the final Raw of 2009, getting disqualified in a rematch against Cena. On 31 January 2010 at the Royal Rumble, Sheamus defeated Randy Orton by disqualification to retain the WWE Championship, following interference from Orton's teammate Cody Rhodes. On 21 February, Sheamus lost the WWE Championship at the Elimination Chamber pay-per-view in the Elimination Chamber match after he was eliminated by Triple H. During the match, Sheamus suffered a concussion and as a result did not attend Raw the following night. Upon his return, he attacked Triple H in revenge, setting up a match at WrestleMania XXVI on 28 March where Sheamus lost. At Extreme Rules on 25 April, Sheamus attacked Triple H at the beginning of the show and later defeated him in a Street Fight. After a series of kicks to the head to win, he continued his assault after the match finished resulting in Triple H being written off television for ten months.

On 20 June at Fatal 4-Way pay-per-view, Sheamus won a fatal four-way match, following interference from The Nexus that allowed him to pin Cena, winning the WWE Championship for the second time and being named the one-hundredth WWE Champion in history. He defeated Cena in a steel cage match to retain the championship on 18 July at the Money in the Bank pay-per-view, after The Nexus interfered again. He retained the title against Orton on 15 August at SummerSlam by disqualification. On 19 September at Night of Champions, Sheamus lost the WWE Championship to Orton in a six-pack elimination challenge, which also included Cena, Chris Jericho, Edge and Wade Barrett. Sheamus received his rematch for the title on 3 October at Hell in a Cell, but was again defeated by Orton in a Hell in a Cell match.

==== King Sheamus and Royal Rumble winner (2010–2012) ====
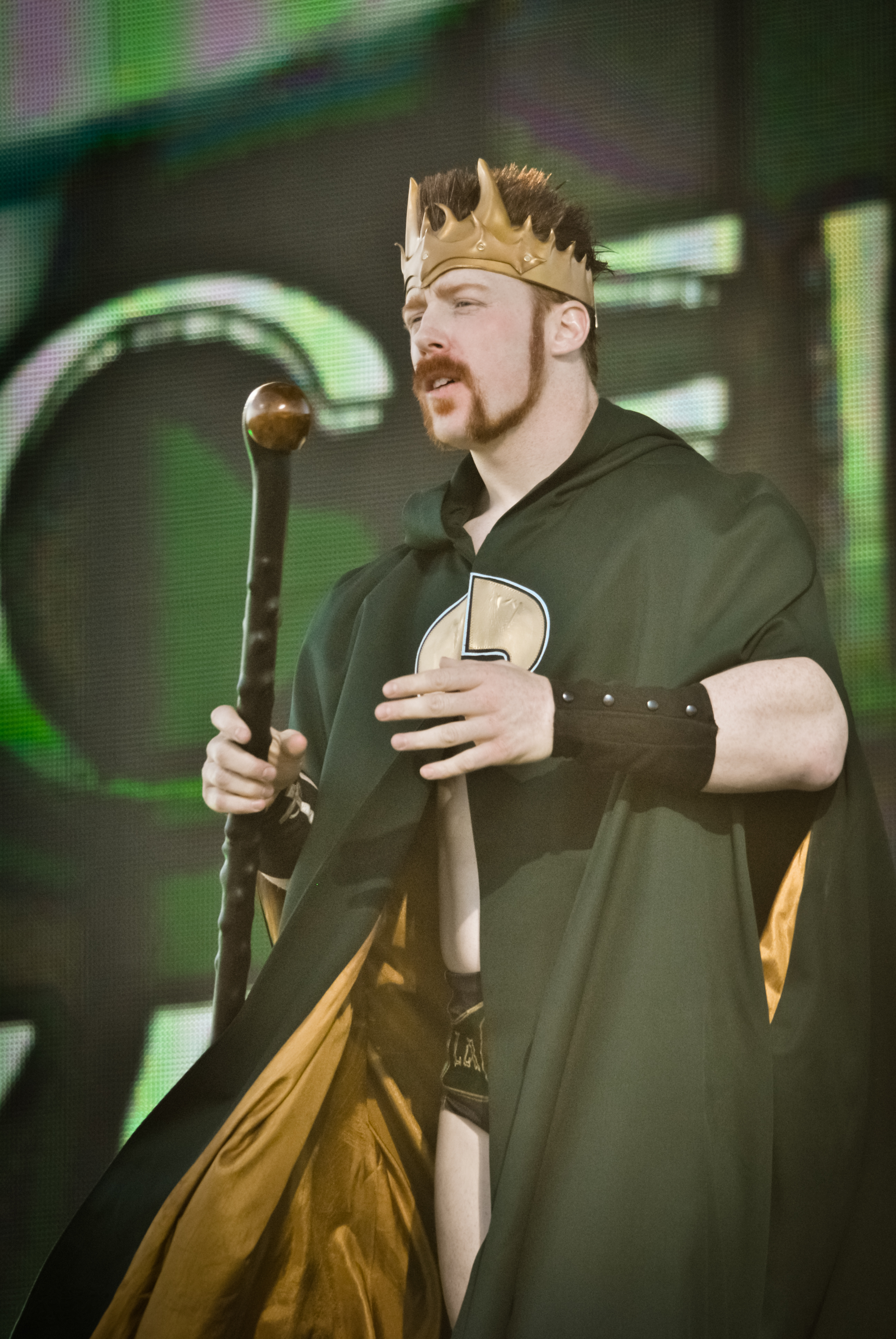
Sheamus as the 2010 King of the Ring

Sheamus bounced back on 29 November, with wins over Kofi Kingston and John Morrison to become the 2010 King of the Ring, after receiving a bye through the second round. As "King Sheamus", he faced Morrison again on 19 December at the TLC: Tables, Ladders and Chairs pay-per-view for a future WWE Championship match, but lost in a ladder match. Going into 2011, he continued to lose to Morrison in a mixture of singles and tag team matches. Triple H returned on 28 February and took revenge for his scripted ten-month injury by putting Sheamus through the announce table.

On 7 March, after losing a match against Daniel Bryan, Sheamus challenged him to a rematch with his WWE career on the line against Bryan's United States Championship. He won his match against Bryan the following week, winning his first United States title. The rematch between Sheamus and Bryan took place on 3 April, during the pre-show of WrestleMania XXVII, and ended in a draw after interference from the lumberjacks. The next night on Raw, Sheamus retained the United States Championship against Bryan in a rematch. In the 2011 Supplemental Draft, Sheamus was drafted to the SmackDown brand, and made his SmackDown debut on 29 April by attacking Kingston. He brought the United States Championship to SmackDown, but lost it back to the Raw brand at Extreme Rules on 1 May when Kingston defeated him in a Tables match.

On the 3 June episode of SmackDown, Sheamus lost a World Heavyweight Championship match to Randy Orton due to biased refereeing from Christian. Two weeks later, he lost a match to Christian, ending his chance to compete in the World Heavyweight Championship match at Capitol Punishment on 19 June. At Money in the Bank on 17 July, he competed in the Money in the Bank ladder match for a World Heavyweight Championship match contract, but lost. On the 29 July episode of SmackDown, Sheamus started a feud with Mark Henry over Henry being a bully, turning face in the process. At SummerSlam on 14 August, he lost to Henry via countout. Sheamus went on a fourteen-match winning streak that ended after interference from Christian, with whom he had been feuding. During this time, Sheamus defeated Christian in three consecutive matches at Hell in a Cell on 2 October, Vengeance on 23 October, and on SmackDown. He then went on a twelve match winning streak, building towards winning the Royal Rumble on 29 January 2012. He entered the match twenty-second and won by last eliminating Chris Jericho to earn a main event championship match at WrestleMania XXVIII.

==== World Heavyweight Champion (2012–2013) ====
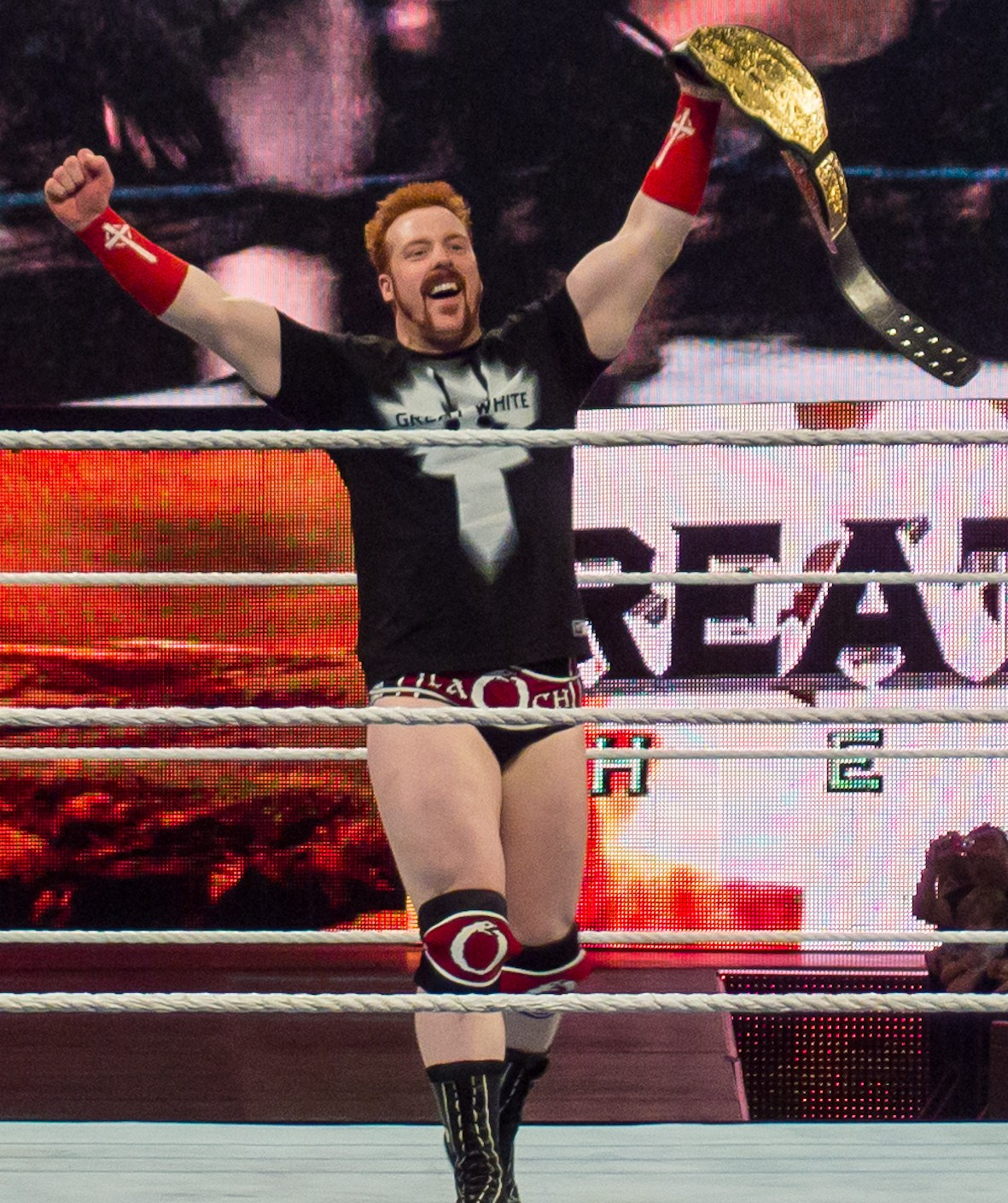
Sheamus as the World Heavyweight Champion in April 2012

On 19 February at Elimination Chamber, Sheamus attacked World Heavyweight Champion Daniel Bryan after Bryan retained his title, thus challenging Bryan the World Heavyweight Championship on 1 April at WrestleMania XXVIII, which Sheamus won in a record 18 seconds. On the 6 April episode of SmackDown, Sheamus lost to Alberto Del Rio in a non-title match by disqualification, thus earning Del Rio a future title match and starting a feud between the two. On 29 April at Extreme Rules, Sheamus successfully defended the World Heavyweight Championship against Bryan in a two-out-of-three falls match. Sheamus then returned to his feud with Del Rio which eventually began to include Chris Jericho and Randy Orton. The rivalry between them culminated in a fatal-four-way match for the World Heavyweight Championship on 20 May at Over the Limit, where Sheamus pinned Jericho to retain the title. Del Rio earned another title shot on the 25 May episode of SmackDown, but suffered a concussion a week before their match at No Way Out and was subsequently replaced by Dolph Ziggler; Sheamus retained the title in their match at the event on 17 June. Sheamus went on to retain the title against Del Rio and Ziggler over the next few months, including at Money in the Bank on 15 July, SummerSlam on 19 August, and Night of Champions on 16 September. On 28 October at Hell in a Cell, Sheamus lost the World Heavyweight Championship to Big Show, ending his reign, which was the third longest in the title's history, at 210 days.

Sheamus faced Big Show for the World Heavyweight Championship on November at Survivor Series, defeating Big Show by disqualification, failing to win the title. Afterward, Sheamus repeatedly hit Big Show with a steel chair. This led to a Chairs match on 16 December at TLC: Tables, Ladders and Chairs, where Sheamus again failed to regain the title. On the 24 December episode of Raw, Sheamus defeated Big Show in a non-title lumberjack match.

On 27 January 2013, at the Royal Rumble, Sheamus entered the Royal Rumble at number eleven, eliminating five other wrestlers before Ryback eliminated him. After being a frequent target of The Shield, Sheamus gained vengeance on the stable when he united with John Cena and Ryback to attack them. This culminated in a six-man tag team match at Elimination Chamber, where the Shield emerged victorious. In late February, Sheamus aligned himself with Randy Orton to feud with The Shield. Over the next weeks, Sheamus and Orton saved each other from attacks by The Shield and Big Show. On the 15 March episode of SmackDown, Sheamus and Orton were then allowed to pick a third partner to face the Shield in a six-man tag team match at WrestleMania 29 and chose Ryback. Three days later on Raw, however, Ryback was booked for another match at WrestleMania, leaving the spot open. Later that night, Big Show saved the two from an attack by The Shield and was recruited as their partner. On 7 April at WrestleMania 29, Sheamus, Orton and Big Show were defeated by The Shield, after which both men were knocked out by Big Show. The following night on Raw, Sheamus and Orton faced off in a match to earn a match with Big Show, however, the match ended in a no contest after Big Show interfered. Sheamus and Orton then defeated Big Show in two handicap matches on SmackDown and Raw.

==== United States Champion (2013–2014) ====
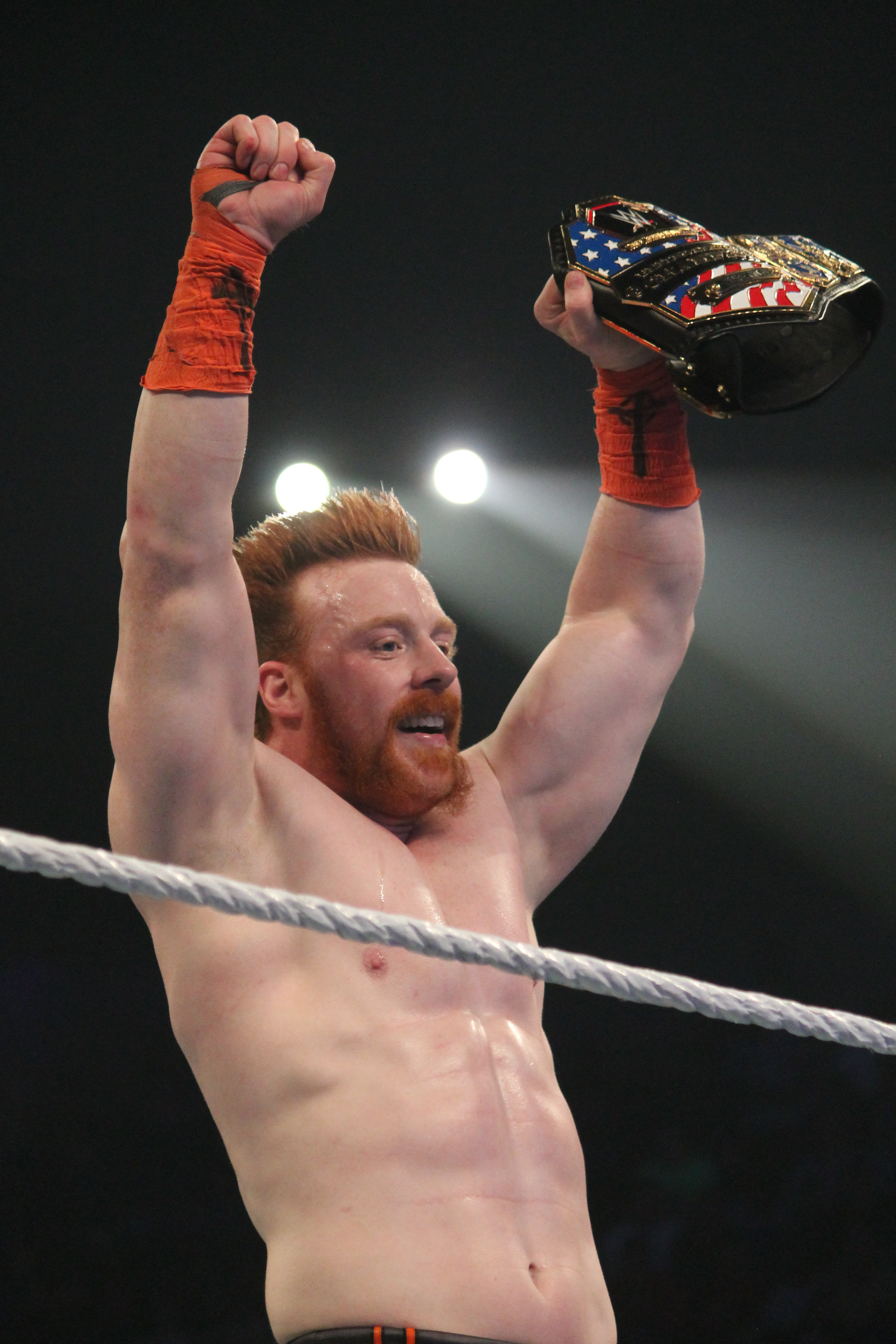
Sheamus won his second United States Championship in May 2014.

Later that month, Sheamus re-entered a feud with Mark Henry after the two repeatedly attacked each other backstage. Sheamus and Henry then challenged each other in tests of strength, but with Sheamus unable to best Henry, he resorted to attacking Henry. After Sheamus attacked a commentary-bound Henry during a match, Henry whipped Sheamus with a belt, prompting a strap match on 19 May at Extreme Rules, where Sheamus emerged victorious. Sheamus then began feuding with Damien Sandow, when Sandow hosted a series of mental challenges on SmackDown, and Sheamus repeatedly interrupted and tried to solve the challenges. However, when Sheamus failed to solve the puzzles, he instead resorted to physical violence. On 16 June, during the Payback pre-show, Sheamus defeated Sandow in a singles match. The following night on Raw, Sheamus was defeated by Sandow and Cody Rhodes in a handicap match after Sandow pinned him with a roll-up. The rivalry culminated in a Dublin Street Fight on the 28 June episode of SmackDown, where Sheamus emerged victorious. On 14 July at Money in the Bank, Sheamus competed in the WWE Championship Money in the Bank ladder match, but was unsuccessful as the match was won by Orton. During the match, Sheamus suffered a hematoma on his left thigh after being thrown into a horizontal ladder, which prevented him from competing that week. Sheamus returned to in-ring action on the 22 July episode of Raw, losing to World Heavyweight Champion Alberto Del Rio in a non-title match. On 7 August, WWE confirmed Sheamus had suffered a torn labrum in his shoulder that would require surgery, and was expected to miss between four and six months of ring action.

On 26 January 2014, at the Royal Rumble, Sheamus returned as a surprise entrant in the Royal Rumble match; he was eliminated by Roman Reigns in the final three. The following night on Raw, Sheamus, Bryan and John Cena qualified for the Elimination Chamber match for the WWE World Heavyweight Championship; he was eliminated by Christian in the match. This began a brief feud leading up to WrestleMania, in which Sheamus consistently was victorious. He was part of the final four in the André the Giant Memorial battle royal at WrestleMania XXX on 6 April, before he and Del Rio eliminated each other. On 14 April, Sheamus participated in the Intercontinental Championship number one contender tournament, which was held on Raw. He advanced to the next round by defeating Jack Swagger, before losing to Bad News Barrett in the semi-finals on 21 April.

On the 5 May episode of Raw, Sheamus won a 20-man battle royal to win the United States Championship for the second time, last eliminating previous champion Dean Ambrose. Sheamus then began feuding with Cesaro and his manager Paul Heyman, culminating in a match between Sheamus and Cesaro for the title at Payback on 1 June, which Sheamus won. On 9 June, Sheamus defeated Bad News Barrett to qualify for the Money in the Bank ladder match for the vacant WWE World Heavyweight Championship; the match was won by Cena on 29 June. Sheamus was in the Intercontinental Championship battle royal at Battleground on 20 July; the match was won by The Miz. Sheamus successfully defended the title against Cesaro at Night of Champions on 21 September, and The Miz at Hell in a Cell on 26 October. He lost the title to Rusev on 3 November, in a match which aired exclusively on the WWE Network, ending his reign at 182 days. Following this, Sheamus was written off television when he and Big Show were attacked by Rusev and Mark Henry, allowing Sheamus time off for surgery.

==== The League of Nations (2015–2016) ====
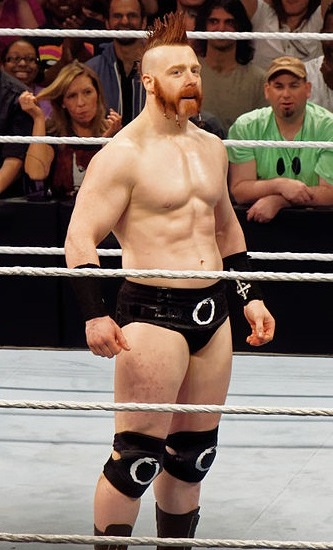
Sheamus after returning with his new-look in March 2015

"For months, Sheamus had been in a lower-level position, sometimes comedic, sometimes in a tag team but never presented or treated as the threat-in-waiting for the champion on a consistent basis".

— Pro Wrestling Insider writer Mike Johnson describes Sheamus' storyline position before winning the world title in 2015

On the 30 March episode of Raw, Sheamus returned from injury, having drastically changed his look, including a mohawk and braided beard, appearing to save Daniel Bryan and Dolph Ziggler from an attack by Bad News Barrett, but then attacked Bryan and Ziggler instead, turning heel in the process for the first time since 2011. Sheamus then explained his heel turn and new attitude by claiming that "the era of underdogs is over", resulting in a feud with Ziggler. On the 16 April episode of SmackDown, Sheamus announced that he would face Ziggler in a Kiss Me Arse match at Extreme Rules on 26 April, which he lost. However, Sheamus refused to follow the stipulation, and instead made Ziggler kiss his behind, despite losing. At Payback on 17 May, Sheamus defeated Ziggler in a rematch. At Elimination Chamber on 31 May, Sheamus participated in the Elimination Chamber match for the vacant Intercontinental Championship, but was unsuccessful as the match was won by Ryback. At Money in the Bank on 14 June, Sheamus won the Money in the Bank ladder match to earn a WWE World Heavyweight Championship contract. Sheamus then began a feud with Randy Orton, who was also part of the ladder match, with both men attacking each other and facing off in tag-team matches. Sheamus lost to Orton at Battleground on 19 July, but defeated Orton at SummerSlam on 23 August.

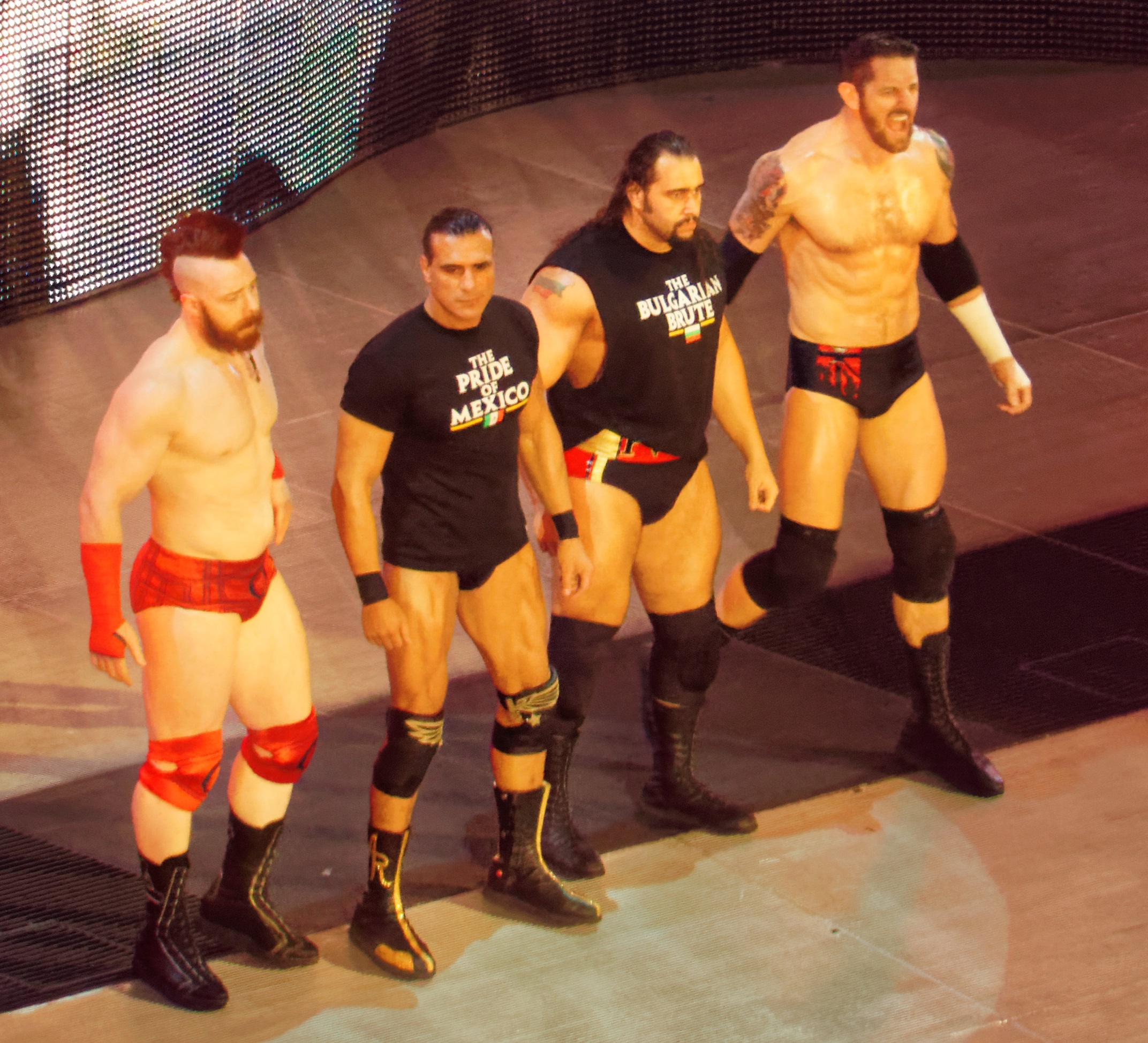
The League of Nations in April 2016

In November, Sheamus competed in the tournament for the vacant WWE World Heavyweight Championship, being eliminated in the first round by Cesaro. At Survivor Series on 22 November, Sheamus cashed in his Money in the Bank contract and defeated newly crowned champion Roman Reigns, after he refused to shake hands with Triple H, to win the title, thus aligning with Triple H and The Authority. On the 30 November episode of Raw, Sheamus announced that he had formed his own stable called The League of Nations with Alberto Del Rio, Rusev and King Barrett, with the members of which having been born outside the United States, while remaining associated with the Authority. In addition, he proclaimed his championship reign as "Sheamus 5:15", a play on Austin 3:16 and Reigns' short-lived title reign of five minutes and 15 seconds.

At TLC: Tables, Ladders and Chairs on 13 December, Sheamus defeated Reigns in a Tables, Ladders and Chairs match after interference from The League of Nations. After the match, Reigns attacked Sheamus and Triple H. This resulted in a rematch the following night on Raw for the title with the stipulation that Reigns would be fired should he lose. Despite interference from the chairman Mr. McMahon, Sheamus lost the title, ending his reign at 22 days. On the 4 January 2016 episode of Raw, he failed to regain the title from Reigns with McMahon as special guest referee. On 24 January, Sheamus entered the Royal Rumble at number 29, where he made to the final four, before being eliminated by Reigns.

At Fastlane on 21 February, WWE Tag Team Champions The New Day (Big E, Kofi Kingston and Xavier Woods) began mocking The League of Nations, calling them the "league of booty". They continued to mock The League of Nations in various segments and skits while simultaneously feuding with other teams. At Roadblock on 12 March, Sheamus and Barrett unsuccessfully challenged for the WWE Tag Team Championship. The next night on Raw, The New Day defeated Del Rio and Rusev, prompting all four members of The League to attack The New Day after the match. The League of Nations then challenged and defeated The New Day in a six-man tag team match at WrestleMania 32 on 3 April. After the match, they were confronted and attacked by Mick Foley, Stone Cold Steve Austin, and Shawn Michaels. The next night on Raw, Barrett and Sheamus faced The New Day in another tag team title match, in a losing effort. After the match, the League of Nations blamed Barrett for being the "weak link" and attacked him, ejecting him from the group, before the rest of the team was attacked by The Wyatt Family. The feud was suspended within a month as Bray Wyatt suffered an injury, which led to Del Rio saying that The League might split soon as a result.

On the 28 April episode of SmackDown, The League of Nations would compete in a six-man tag match against Sami Zayn, Cesaro, and Kalisto; however, Del Rio and Rusev walked out during the match. Sheamus, who would do the same, confronted Del Rio and Rusev during a brawl and said that the league is finished, confirming the end of the group. Del Rio would also confirm in an interview that the group was finished. At Money in the Bank on 19 June, he lost to Apollo Crews.

==== The Bar (2016–2019) ====
On 19 July at the 2016 WWE draft, Sheamus was drafted to Raw. Sheamus would then begin a rivalry with Cesaro, after losing to Cesaro on the 1 August episode of Raw, the two would continue to brawl after the match with match officials having to pull them apart. On the 8 August episode of Raw, after losing to Cesaro in a rematch, he would later cost Cesaro the United States Championship after interfering in his main event impromptu match against Rusev. The following week, Raw General Manager Mick Foley booked Sheamus and Cesaro in a Best of Seven Series, with the first match taking place on 21 August on the SummerSlam kick-off show, which Sheamus won. Sheamus would defeat Cesaro in the second and third matches, but lost to Cesaro in the fourth, fifth and sixth matches. At Clash of Champions on 25 September, the match ended in a no contest, leaving their series tied at 3–3. The next night on Raw, Foley decided to make the two partners to receive a future Raw Tag Team Championship opportunity. Later that night, they defeated a few local competitors, but still did not seem to be seeing eye to eye. Sheamus and Cesaro defeated The New Day (Big E and Kofi Kingston) on the 24 October episode of Raw, and defeated Big E and Xavier Woods by disqualification at Hell in a Cell on 30 October. On the 7 November episode of Raw, Sheamus and Cesaro were announced as part of Team Raw for the 10–on–10 Survivor Series Tag Team Elimination match at Survivor Series on 20 November, which Team Raw won with Sheamus and Cesaro being the sole survivors of their team. The next night on Raw, Sheamus and Cesaro again failed to capture the Raw Tag Team Championship from The New Day, represented by Big E and Kingston. After hinting at a break-up, the pair got into a bar brawl with men who offended them and finally began to cooperate, thus turning Sheamus into a face. On 18 December at Roadblock: End of the Line, Sheamus and Cesaro defeated Big E and Kingston to win the Raw Tag Team Championship, marking Sheamus' first tag team championship in both his WWE and entire wrestling career. On 29 January on the Royal Rumble kickoff show, Sheamus and Cesaro lost the Raw Tag Team Championship to Luke Gallows and Karl Anderson, and failed to regain them after The Hardy Boyz won the title at WrestleMania 33 on 2 April.

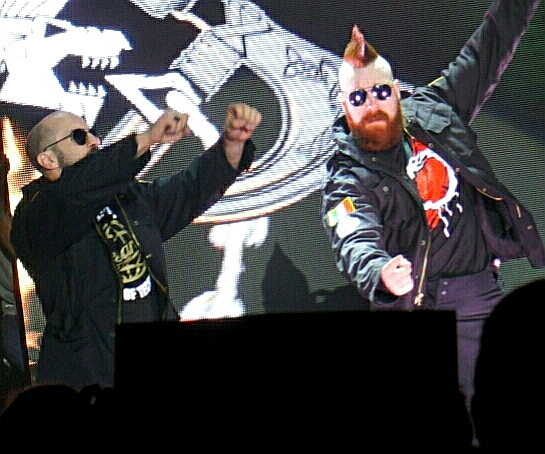
Sheamus (right) and Cesaro in May 2017

The following night on Raw, Sheamus and Cesaro defeated Enzo Amore and Big Cass to become the number one contenders for the Raw Tag Team Championship at Payback. At the event on 30 April, and after failing to regain the title, both Sheamus and Cesaro turned heel by attacking The Hardy Boyz. From there, now known as "The Bar", their entrances became further synchronized as they wore the same attire into the ring. They then won a tag team turmoil to earn another opportunity for the tag title at Extreme Rules. The match was made a steel cage match after Matt Hardy defeated Sheamus on the 22 May episode of Raw, in a match where the winner chose the stipulation for their Extreme Rules bout. At the event on 4 June, The Bar defeated The Hardy Boyz to win the Raw Tag Team Championship for the second time, making Cesaro a three-time champion and Sheamus a two-time champion. The duo made their first televised defence of the title against The Hardy Boyz on the 12 June episode of Raw in a two out of three falls match where the two teams tied at 1–1 after being counted out. They defended their title against The Hardy Boyz at the Great Balls of Fire pay-per-view on 9 July in a 30-minute Iron Man tag team match by the score 4–3. The Bar lost the Raw Tag Team Championship to Seth Rollins and Dean Ambrose at SummerSlam on 20 August. The Bar lost their rematch for the title to Rollins and Ambrose at No Mercy on 24 September. On 22 October at TLC: Tables, Ladders & Chairs, they teamed with The Miz, Braun Strowman and Kane against the reunited Shield and Kurt Angle (who replaced Roman Reigns after he was not medically cleared to compete), in a five-on-three TLC match, which they went on to lose. On the 6 November episode of Raw, the duo regained their titles from Rollins and Ambrose, winning the title for the third time. At Survivor Series, on 19 November, they were defeated by The Usos (Jey Uso and Jimmy Uso) in an interbrand Champion vs Champion match. The Bar later lost the tag team titles to the team of Rollins and Jason Jordan on the Christmas episode of Raw.

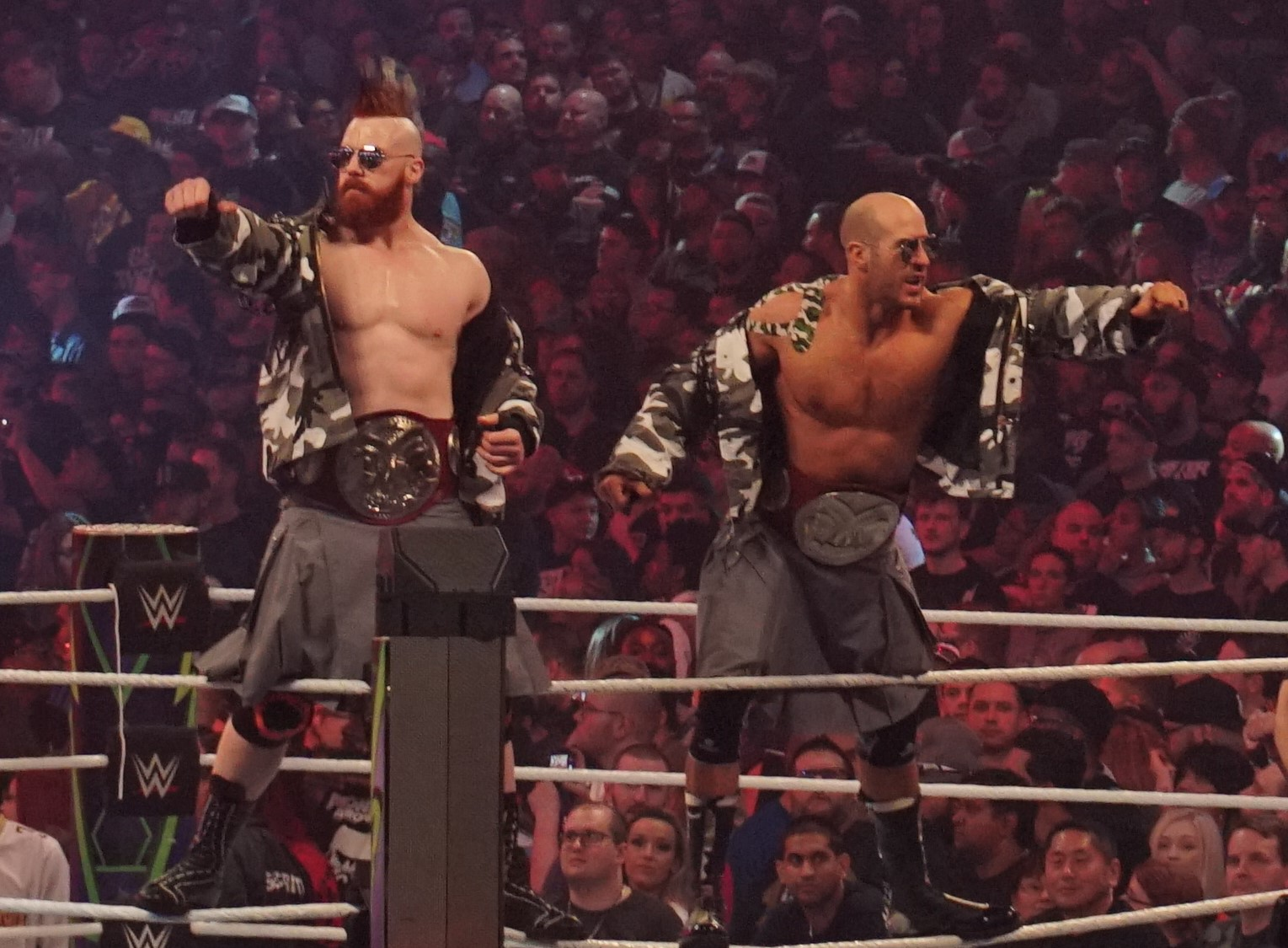
The Bar as the Raw Tag Team Champions at WrestleMania 34

On 28 January 2018, The Bar won back the title at Royal Rumble, setting the record for the most reigns as a team at four. Earlier in the Royal Rumble match, Sheamus entered at number 11 and was quickly eliminated by Heath Slater, lasting just one second in the match. Following consecutive losses to Titus Worldwide (Apollo Crews and Titus O'Neil) on Raw, they defended their title against the two at Elimination Chamber, retaining successfully at the event on 25 February. On the 12 March episode of Raw, after Strowman single-handedly won a tag team battle royale to determine the number one contenders for their tag team titles at WrestleMania 34 although he lacked a partner, Angle, by then Raw General Manager, still allowed Strowman to wrestle for the titles, under the provision that he reveal his mystery partner at the event. At the event on 8 April, Strowman revealed his partner to be a 10-year-old fan called Nicholas. The Bar was defeated by Strowman and Nicholas, therefore losing the tag team titles and in turn making Nicholas the youngest champion of any kind in WWE history.

On 17 April, Sheamus and Cesaro were both drafted to SmackDown as part of the Superstar Shake-up. Despite the trade, they still had an opportunity to win the Raw Tag Team Championship as they faced Matt Hardy and Bray Wyatt at the Greatest Royal Rumble on 27 April, but failed to win the titles. The Bar entered a short feud with The New Day (Big E, Kofi Kingston and Xavier Woods), losing to Big E and Woods, and failing to qualify for the Money in the Bank ladder match. After going on a hiatus, the duo returned in late July to take part in a number one contendership tournament for the SmackDown Tag Team Championship and beat The Usos to advance to the finals, where they lost to Big E and Kingston. After failing to become number one contenders again, the duo finally was gifted a title match. At Super Show-Down on 6 October, The Bar failed to win the titles from Kingston and Woods. At SmackDown 1000, The Bar won the titles from Big E and Woods, with the help of Big Show. They retained against Big E and Kingston in a rematch at Crown Jewel on 2 November. The Bar lost to Raw Tag Team Champions AOP (Akam and Rezar) in an interbrand Champion vs Champion match at Survivor Series on 18 November. On the 27 November episode of SmackDown, they had a backstage argument with Big Show, causing him to break away from the team. At TLC on 16 December, they successfully defended the championship against The Usos and Kingston and Woods in a triple threat tag team match. On the 8 January 2019 episode of SmackDown, they accepted a challenge from The Miz and Shane McMahon, which would lead to a tag team title match at the Royal Rumble pay-per-view on 27 January, where they lost the titles.

The following SmackDown, they lost a number one contenders match to The Usos. The Bar defeated Kingston in a handicap match at Fastlane on 10 March. At WrestleMania 35 on 7 April, The Bar lost to The Usos in a fatal four-way tag team match for the SmackDown Tag Team Championship. The following week on SmackDown, Sheamus reportedly suffered a concussion in a six-man tag team match. Cesaro was drafted to Raw a few weeks later, and later confirmed in an interview that The Bar was over.

==== Return to singles competition (2019–2021) ====
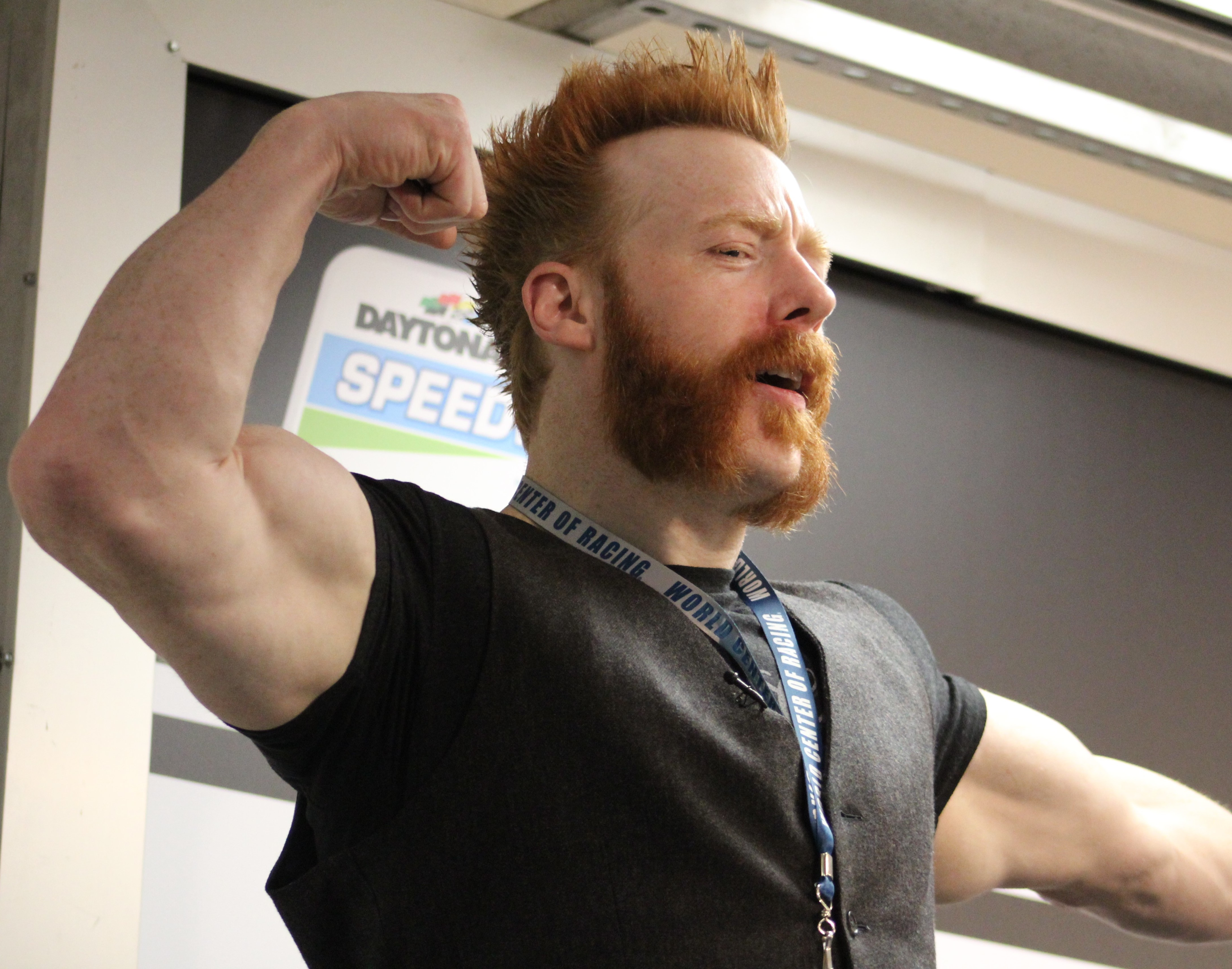
Sheamus posing backstage at the 2020 Daytona 500, where he drove the pace car for the opening laps of the event

On 19 September, it was reported that Sheamus had healed and was ready to return to the ring. On the 29 November episode of SmackDown, Sheamus, with his old hairstyle, appeared in a vignette announcing that he will return soon.

On the 3 January 2020 episode of SmackDown, Sheamus returned from injury, appearing to save Shorty G from an attack by The Revival (Dash Wilder and Scott Dawson), but then delivered a Brogue Kick to Shorty G. Sheamus then defeated Shorty G at Royal Rumble on 26 January, and on the 31 January episode of SmackDown. He began a feud with Jeff Hardy, insulting him for his various addiction problems, but was defeated by him in the first round of the Intercontinental Championship tournament on the 22 May episode of SmackDown. On the 29 May episode of SmackDown, Hardy was "arrested" after crashing his car into Elias, however later in the episode, Hardy would cause a distraction for Sheamus, costing him a match against Daniel Bryan, and attacked Sheamus after the match.

The feud led to a match at Backlash on 14 June, which Sheamus won. On the 24 July episode of SmackDown, Sheamus lost to Hardy in a Bar Fight, ending their feud. Sheamus then started a short feud with Big E, after he wanted help from the SmackDown wrestlers against Retribution's attacks, but Sheamus denied him, before mocking him. Sheamus lost to Big E on the 21 August episode of SmackDown, at Payback on 30 August and on the 9 October episode of SmackDown, ending their feud.

As part of the 2020 Draft in October, Sheamus was drafted to the Raw brand. On the 26 October episode of Raw, Sheamus defeated Riddle to qualify for Team Raw at Survivor Series. Later on, he was involved in a triple threat match against Keith Lee and Braun Strowman for the latter's qualification. He also competed in a tag team match with Strowman against Lee and Riddle in a losing effort. At Survivor Series on 22 November, Team Raw defeated Team SmackDown in a clean sweep. Sheamus eliminated Seth Rollins with a Brogue Kick to score the first elimination. In November, Sheamus began a storyline with Drew McIntyre where their real-life friendship was acknowledged. On the 30 November episode of Raw, Sheamus was a guest on Miz TV, where The Miz and John Morrison berated him for his friendship with McIntyre, to which Sheamus defended McIntyre from the accusations, and attempted to attack Miz, but was beaten down by Miz and Morrison. Sheamus teamed with McIntyre to defeat Miz and Morrison in a tag team match later on in the night. At the Royal Rumble on 31 January 2021, Sheamus entered at number 27, but was eliminated by Strowman. On the 1 February episode of Raw, Sheamus delivered a Brogue Kick to McIntyre after shortly confronting then Royal Rumble winner, Edge. He bemoaned the fact that he was only acknowledged as just "Drew McIntyre's friend", implying that he was overshadowed by his success as the WWE Champion. As a result, he terminated his friendship with McIntyre, and vowed to take the WWE Championship away from him. At the Elimination Chamber on 21 February, Sheamus faced McIntyre, Hardy, AJ Styles, Kofi Kingston and Randy Orton in an Elimination Chamber match for the WWE Championship. Sheamus would eliminate Kingston but would be the second to last man eliminated in the match by Styles. Following the event, Sheamus would continue to feud with McIntyre and the two faced each other on the 1 March episode of Raw, where Sheamus was defeated. The two had a rematch the following week in a No Disqualification match, where Sheamus would once again lose to McIntyre. Sheamus and McIntyre would fight once more in a No Holds Barred match at Fastlane on 21 March, with McIntyre defeating Sheamus, ending the feud.

On the 22 March episode of Raw, Sheamus would face WWE Champion Bobby Lashley in a losing effort and backstage, attacked United States Champion Riddle. The following week, Sheamus defeated Riddle in a non-title match to earn a championship opportunity at WrestleMania 37. On the second night of the event on 11 April, Sheamus defeated Riddle to win the United States Championship for the third time. He would go on to defend the title against the likes of Humberto Carrillo and Ricochet over the next several months. At SummerSlam on 21 August, Sheamus dropped the title to Damian Priest, ending his third reign at 132 days.

==== The Brawling Brutes (2021–2023) ====
As part of the 2021 Draft, Sheamus was drafted to the SmackDown brand. In November, Sheamus allied with Ridge Holland, after Holland would refer to him as his idol and help Sheamus win his matches. At the Day 1 event on 1 January 2022, he and Holland teamed up to defeat Cesaro and Ricochet. At Royal Rumble on 29 January, Sheamus entered at No. 17 but was eliminated by Bad Bunny. In March, they entered a feud with The New Day (Kofi Kingston and Xavier Woods), where on the 11 March episode of SmackDown, Sheamus and Holland would introduce Butch as part of their stable. On the second night of WrestleMania 38 on April 3, Sheamus and Holland defeated Kingston and Woods in a quick match. At Money in the Bank on 2 July, Sheamus competed in the Money in the Bank ladder match, which was won by Theory. On the 29 July episode of SmackDown, Sheamus faced Drew McIntyre in a "Good Old Fashioned Donnybrook" to determine the #1 contender for the Undisputed WWE Universal Championship at Clash at the Castle, but lost.

"Sheamus won over the crowd with his performance, but Gunther won the match ... Even in defeat, he left the ring to a standing ovation."

— Sports Illustrated writer Justin Barrasso on Sheamus' performance at Clash at the Castle

On the 19 August episode of SmackDown, Sheamus won a fatal five-way match, earning a match against Gunther for the Intercontinental Championship at Clash at the Castle. At the event on 3 September, Sheamus lost to Gunther, but received a standing ovation from the Cardiff crowd after the match, turning face in the process. At Extreme Rules, The Brawling Brutes defeated Imperium in a Six-Man Tag Team Good Old Fashioned Donnybrook match. At Survivor Series: WarGames on 26 November, The Brawling Brutes along with Drew McIntyre and Kevin Owens lost to The Bloodline in a WarGames match.

In January 2023, Sheamus competed in the Royal Rumble match but was eliminated by McIntyre and Gunther. He later faced both in a triple threat match for the Intercontinental Championship at WrestleMania 39 in April, where Gunther retained the title. By September, Sheamus had suffered a shoulder injury that ruled him out of action. During his absence, The Brawling Brutes disbanded after Holland walked out on Butch during a tag team match.

==== Final feuds (2024–2026) ====
Sheamus returned from injury on the 15 April 2024 episode of Raw, defeating Ivar. At the Night 1 of the WWE Draft on the 26 April episode of SmackDown, Sheamus was drafted to the Raw brand. In August 2024, Sheamus entered into a feud with a now-renamed Pete Dunne, who had grown tired of the nickname "Butch" and was infuriated by Sheamus' treatment of him. After multiple attacks, interrupting varying matches (additionally fuelled by Sheamus taunting Dunne with his old nickname), their feud culminated in a Good 'Ol Fashioned Donnybrook Match, which Sheamus won, ending their feud. Following the feud, he set his sights on earning the Intercontinental Championship, the sole championship that had eluded him thus far in his career, leading to several matches with reigning Intercontinental Champion Bron Breakker, of which one was interrupted by Ludwig Kaiser, leading to disqualification. This culminated in a triple threat match between Sheamus, Breakker, and Kaiser at Survivor Series: WarGames where Breakker retained the championship. Sheamus got another opportunity at Breakker's Intercontinental Championship at Saturday Night's Main Event XXXVIII but was unsuccessful.

After some time off, Sheamus returned on the 5 May episode of Raw, defeated Austin Theory, before starting a feud against Rusev, that culminated in a Good Old Fashioned Donnybrook match at Clash in Paris where he was defeated. He defeated Shinsuke Nakamura by pinfall in the first round The Last Time Is Now Tournament on the 10 November episode of Raw. Sheamus wrestled his final WWE match the following week on Raw, teaming with Rey Mysterio and John Cena to defeat The Judgment Day. Coincidentally, the match also marked Cena's final appearance on Raw as an active wrestler. Sheamus was later removed from the Last Time Is Now Tournament due to suffering a shoulder injury.

On 5 July 2026, Sheamus' profile on WWE's official roster page was moved to the alumni section, and he would confirm on 11 July that he was departing WWE upon his contract expiring on 1 October, ending his 19-year tenure with the company.

== Other media ==
S. Farrelly Workouts

YouTube information
- Channel: S. Farrelly Workouts
- Years active: 2017–present
- Genre: Fitness
- Subscribers: 1.21 million
- Views: 221 million
- Last updated: July 1, 2026

Farrelly (credited as "Sheamus O'Shaunessy") played the role of "Two Ton" in the 2008 film The Escapist. In 2009, he appeared as a Celtic warrior zombie in the opening sequence of the film Assault of Darkness, and had a small part in Once Upon a Time in Dublin (aka 3 Crosses) as a security guard. He played Owen "Rocksteady" Rocksteed in 2016's Teenage Mutant Ninja Turtles: Out of the Shadows. Farrelly made a cameo appearances as Sheamus in the 2019 film Fighting with My Family a biographical sports comedy-drama about pro wrestler Saraya Bevis. That same year, he also played Thursty in the comedy film Buddy Games.

In 2024, Farrelly was invited as the special guest on College GameDay in Dublin, Ireland. He made headlines after being the only person on the panel to successfully pick Georgia Tech to beat FSU. In the following weeks he joined Georgia Tech, running out of the tunnel with them, and gave a pre game speech. He remains a supporter of the team.

Farrelly runs a YouTube channel called "Celtic Warrior Workouts", in which he invites fellow wrestlers to guide him through their own personal workout routines. He also gives workout advice and promotes experimenting with the different fitness options. He later stated how burnout led him to revamp his workouts, ultimately sparking the launch of the channel.

Farrelly appeared on several episodes of Dustin's Daily News, where he had a rivalry with Dustin the Turkey, the famous Irish sock puppet; this ended with Dustin and Farrelly having a "fight", which Dustin won. Farrelly played a leprechaun wrestler on The Podge and Rodge Show. In July 2014, he made a guest appearance on the USA Network television series Royal Pains. In 2023 Farrelly made a guest appearance on an episode of NCIS: Los Angeles where he played a fighter called Quinton.

=== Video games ===
Year	Title	Notes	Ref.
2010	WWE SmackDown vs. Raw 2011	Video game debut	
2011	WWE All Stars		
2011	WWE '12		
2012	WWE '13		
2013	WWE 2K14		
2014	WWE 2K15		
2015	WWE 2K16		
2016	WWE 2K17		
2017	WWE 2K18		
2018	WWE 2K19		
2019	WWE 2K20		
2020	WWE 2K Battlegrounds		
2022	WWE 2K22		
2023	WWE 2K23		
2024	WWE 2K24		
2025	WWE 2K25		
2026	WWE 2K26		

== Personal life ==
Farrelly married his Filipina-American girlfriend Isabella Revilla on 28 October 2022, with Drew McIntyre serving as best man. The couple reside in Nashville, Tennessee, having previously lived in Lutz, Florida.

Farrelly is a supporter of association football clubs Celtic, Liverpool, and the Tennessee Titans. He is also a supporter of Irish rugby union club Leinster.

In November 2017, he revealed that he suffers from spinal stenosis.

== Filmography ==
=== Film ===
Year	Title	Role	Notes
2008	The Escapist	Two Ton	Film debut; credited as Sheamus O'Shaunessy
2009	Once Upon a Time in Dublin	Guard	
2009	Assault of Darkness	Celtic Warrior	Credited as Sheamus O'Shaunessy
2016	Teenage Mutant Ninja Turtles: Out of the Shadows	Owen Rocksteed / Rocksteady	
2016	Scooby-Doo! and WWE: Curse of the Speed Demon	Himself	Voice
2017	The Jetsons & WWE: Robo-WrestleMania!	Himself	Voice
2019	Fighting with My Family	Himself	
2019	The Buddy Games	Thursty	
2019	Atone	Black	
2020	The Main Event	Himself	

=== Television ===
Year	Title	Role	Notes
2011	18th MTV Europe Music Awards	Himself	Presenter "Best Male Award"
2013	Teens Wanna Know	Himself	With Carly Rae Jepsen; season 2, episode 37
2014	Royal Pains	Jack Piper	Season 6, episode 7: "Electric Youth"
2016	Made in Hollywood	Himself	4 June; season 11, episode 38
2023	NCIS: Los Angeles	Quinton	Season 14; episode 15: "The Other Shoe"

== Championships and accomplishments ==
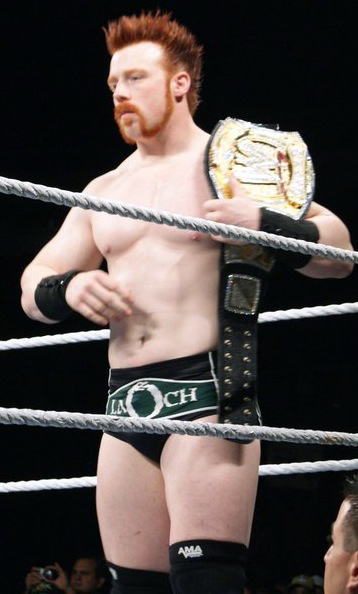
Sheamus is a three-time WWE Champion.

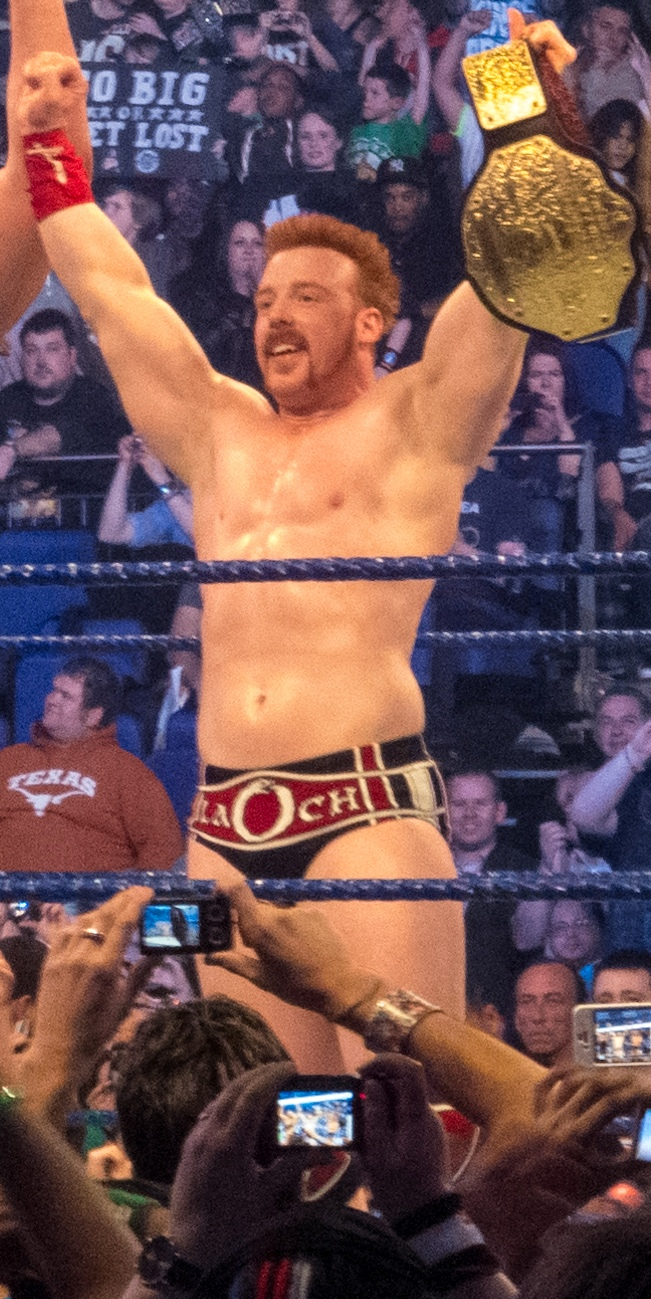
Sheamus has also won the World Heavyweight Championship once, making him a four-time world champion in total.

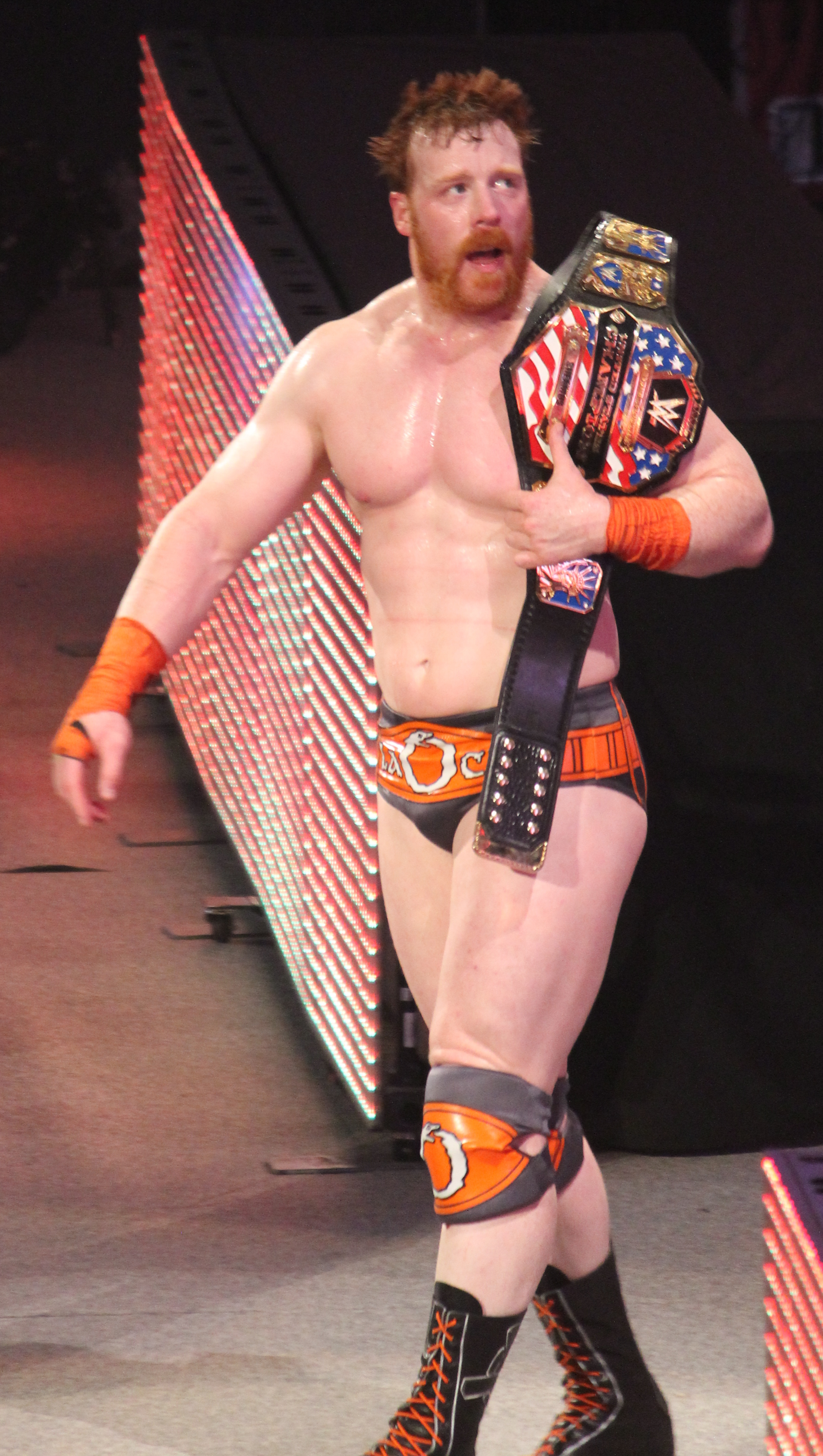
Sheamus is a three-time United States Champion.

- ESPN
  - Match of the Year (2022) – vs. Gunther at Clash at the Castle
- Florida Championship Wrestling
  - FCW Florida Heavyweight Championship (1 time)
- Irish Whip Wrestling
  - IWW International Heavyweight Championship (2 times)
  - IWW International Heavyweight Championship Tournament (2005)
- Pro Wrestling Illustrated
  - Ranked No. 5 of the top 500 wrestlers in the PWI 500 in 2012
- Rolling Stone
  - Most Welcome Heel Turn (2015) tied with Naomi
- World Wrestling Entertainment/WWE
  - WWE Championship (3 times) (Note: Sheamus' first two reigns were when the title was known as the WWE Championship while his third reign was as WWE World Heavyweight Champion.)
  - World Heavyweight Championship (1 time)
  - WWE United States Championship (3 times)
  - WWE Raw Tag Team Championship (4 times) – with Cesaro
  - WWE SmackDown Tag Team Championship (1 time) – with Cesaro
  - King of the Ring (2010)
  - Money in the Bank (2015)
  - Royal Rumble (2012)
  - Slammy Award (4 times)
    - Breakout Star of the Year (2009)
    - Feat of Strength of the Year (2012) Delivering "White Noise" to Big Show
    - Outstanding Achievement in Muppet Resemblance (2011)
    - Superstar/Diva Most in Need of Make-up (2010)
  - WWE Year-End Award for Tag Team of the Year (2018) – with Cesaro
- Wrestling Observer Newsletter
  - Most Improved (2010)
