= Johnny Was =

- DVD cover
- Directed by: Mark Hammond
- Written by: Brendan Foley
- Produced by: Patrick FitzSymons, Tom Maguire, Paul Largan, Brendan Foley, Lars Hermann
- Starring: Vinnie Jones; Patrick Bergin; Samantha Mumba; Lennox Lewis; Roger Daltrey; Eriq La Salle
- Cinematography: Mark Moriarty
- Edited by: Leif Axel Kjeldsen
- Distributed by: Sony Pictures Entertainment
- Release date: 2 February 2006 (Dublin Film Festival)
- Running time: 93 minutes
- Countries: Ireland; United Kingdom
- Language: English
- Budget: £2.2 million

Johnny Was is an Irish/English gangster movie directed by Mark Hammond, written by Brendan Foley, and made in 2005 by Ben Katz Productions, Borderline Productions and Nordisk Film. It was released in the UK in 2006 by Sony Pictures and in the US by First Look Studios.

== Synopsis ==
Johnny Doyle escapes a violent past as a Provisional IRA volunteer in Ireland to lie low in London, until his former mentor Flynn breaks out of Brixton Prison, members of a dissident republican group they are hellbent on derailing the Irish peace process with a few well-placed bombs. Unable to escape Brixton, they find themselves trapped together in Johnny's anything-but-safe safe house, sandwiched between a friendly Rastafarian reggae pirate radio station upstairs and a local Yardie, heroin-dealing gangster Julius, downstairs.

As the charismatic Flynn finds some common criminal ground with the Yardies, Johnny fights to realize a peace process of his own but makes the mistake of falling for Julius's girlfriend Rita, sparking an all-out war.

It is a London-based thriller in the vein of The Long Good Friday, in which questions of race, morality, identity and loyalty play out against a soundtrack of reggae, rock, new wave, soul and drum and bass.

== Cast ==
- Vinnie Jones - Johnny Doyle
- Eriq La Salle - Julius
- Patrick Bergin - Flynn
- Samantha Mumba - Rita
- Lennox Lewis - Ras
- Wilson Jermaine Heredia - Sparra
- Roger Daltrey - Jimmy

== Production notes ==
Johnny Was was principally financed by Ben Katz Productions, the Northern Ireland Film and Television Commission, the Irish Film Board, and Nordisk.

The scene set in Brixton Market was actually filmed at Smithfield Market in Belfast. Many of the other shots were taken in various locations around Northern Ireland. Lisburn railway station was used as a substitute for Brixton railway station.

Roger Daltrey, the lead singer of The Who, played Jimmy Nolan. Patrick Bergin had previously played a member of the Provisional Irish Republican Army in Patriot Games.

== Reception ==
Variety gave a good review to the original reggae soundtrack by Adrian Sherwood.
