= Assault of Darkness =

- Directed by: Brendan Foley
- Written by: Brendan Foley
- Produced by: Peter Burrell; Joe Condren; Brendan Foley; Paul Valentine
- Starring: Vinnie Jones; Jason Barry; Nora-Jane Noone
- Cinematography: Stephen Murphy
- Edited by: Andrew Cohen
- Music by: Graham Slack
- Distributed by: Metrodome Distribution
- Release date: 23 June 2009
- Running time: 90 minutes
- Country: Ireland
- Language: English
- Budget: $1.6 million

Assault of Darkness, also known as Legend of the Bog, is a 2009 Irish horror film by the production company Bog Bodies surrounding local lore in the swamplands outside of Dublin, Ireland. The film's plot follows six strangers who come across an ancient evil in the murky bog and are pitted in a fight for survival. Each of the travelers has a tale of heroism that seemingly links them to the situation, and only a local archaeologist has the theories that may be able to save their lives.

The cinematography was by Stephen Murphy.

== Plot ==
A man is setting up a deadly trap, luring a creature from the darkness by puncturing a drum of water. He kills the creature and is briefly attacked by another who comes out of the bog. These appear to be normal people, capable of survival under the bog's depths. The man shrugs off the attacks and continues on into the night.

Meanwhile, an archaeology Professor (David Wallace) is teaching a class of students about ancient sacrifices that had taken place in Ireland centuries ago. One student with a great deal of questions confronts the mummified remains of a sacrifice, and abruptly leaves the room. Upon investigation he finds that she is a hired assistant (Saiorse Reilly) and she leaves with him on an archaeological evaluation of some of the local hillsides. During this time a pair of travelers (Hannah Ross and her cousin Mallory) break down in an automobile they had stolen and head off on foot. Along the way, Mallory sprains her ankle, and she and Hannah take refuge in a remote cabin at the central area of the bog. A woman named Val Leary and her cab driver (Deano Doyle) get stuck in the bog and inadvertently find their way to the cabin, shortly afterward David and Saiorse arrive, having run into a cow on a nearby road. As the six strangers learn to live together, they are greeted by the outraged owner of the house known simply as "Hunter" or "The Hunter" who invites them in for the night, promising to show them the road out the following morning. As they dine over supper, they regale stories of personal heroisms between one another; Deano states he had once rushed a woman giving birth to children to a hospital, Mallory and Hannah had saved the life of a child's father who had fallen into the bog off chance. While Val admits she had dug up one of the "Bog Men" sacrifices, though she lies and says she did it some time prior and had called the police (which she had not done when she uncovered it earlier the same day). David sparks suspicion and Val and Deano leave. Hunter shortly after decides to go hunting, and provides bedding for the rest to lay on.

During the night, Saiorse has a bad dream and David comforts her. The following morning, they find Deano but a large man who had earlier been resurrected from the Bog itself appears, causing Mallory to fall into a bog pool, nearly drowning, Hunter is able to free her, revealing Val's body who had apparently attempted to grab Mallory from under the bog. Now extremely ill, Mallory is taken back to the cabin, and Hunter is put under Saiorce's scrutiny saying he could have killed them. Deano is led back to the road his Taxi had gotten stuck on, but admits to Hunter he had lied about his story, accidentally killing a fare by catching her coat into the back door of his cab and dragging her to death afterward stashing her body into the swamp. After Hunter parts, Deano attempts to free his taxi and is accidentally dragged to his death as well. Back at the cabin, Hannah departs to find another way out of the bog and ends up getting captured by the giant man. David attempts to intervene and calm the bog man down, but Hunter shoots him, and in his rage the man decapitates Hannah. Upon his return, Mallory tells David that they had lied about their stories as well, that they had accidentally hit an old trench digger walking along the road and buried him near the bog. Dying shortly after, David realizes that their stories seem to have prompted this, Saiorse tells David that she too killed a man, her uncle who constantly beat and raped her, even giving her a still born child. And Hunter claims that a man he had saved in the forest "could have" been saved, instead he killed the man to stop his agony after he accidentally shot him in the first place. The bog man returns, kills Hunter who manages to give David a clue to killing him, when the man is distracted by the water pouring from the cabin's shower, David throws fire into it as it had been laced with gasoline and causes the man as well as the cabin to go up in a ball of fire, allowing David and Saiorse to escape. As they watch, the bog man runs in flames from the house and returns to the bog.

== Cast and characters ==
- Professor David Wallace (Jason Barry)- An archaeology professor who is well versed in the bog men and ancient tribes responsible for putting the bodies into the bog in the first place. He is quick, intelligent and compassionate and is the only one without a story that he had intentionally or unintentionally killed someone.
- Saiorse Reilly (Nora-Jane Noone) - David's "glorified" assistant who helps him perform field experiments. She is hesitant to admit her attraction to him due to the brutal raping from her Uncle as a child whom she had killed in self-defense.
- The Hunter (Vinnie Jones) - A tough outdoorsman and trapper who knows about the bog men who come to life and offers several helpful hints in defeating the bog man who stalks them. He killed a man he had accidentally shot while hunting by putting him out of his misery.
- Deano Doyle (Gavin Kelty) - A good hearted cab driver who was unlucky to have Val Leary as his fare. He accidentally killed a woman who scorned him by slamming her coat into the back of his cab and unintentionally dragging her to death.
- Val Leary (Shelly Goldstein) - A spiteful, grouchy, mean spirited, and spoiled woman who is as tough on her cab driver as she is on her employees. Her crew had uncovered bog bodies earlier in the day and she told them to discard them, inadvertently releasing the very one who began stalking them.
- Hannah and Mallory Ross (Amy Huberman, Olga Wehrly) - Cousins who had run out of Petrol when attempting to leave in a stolen car. They are kind hearted and regret their actions, however they were also responsible for the death of an old trench digger and buried his body near the bog lands.
- The Bog Body (Adam Fogerty) - A looming giant, bald man who has no knowledge of what year it is or that he is dead. Possessing an unquenchable thirst for water, it is described by Hunter that his kind are caught between death and the after life, seeking the peace of death but still desiring life. Any hostile movements toward him make the offender quite prone to a painful death. He is rushed back into the bog when lit on fire. Leaving only two survivors on his rampage on the cabin in the bog.
- Celtic Warrior (Stephen Farrelly; credited as Sheamus O'Shaunessy) - A zombie that appears at the beginning of the film being hunted by Hunter. He is first shot in the chest by hunter with a compound bow, then set on fire with a second shot.
