= Derek Ugochukwu =

Irish-Nigerian actor

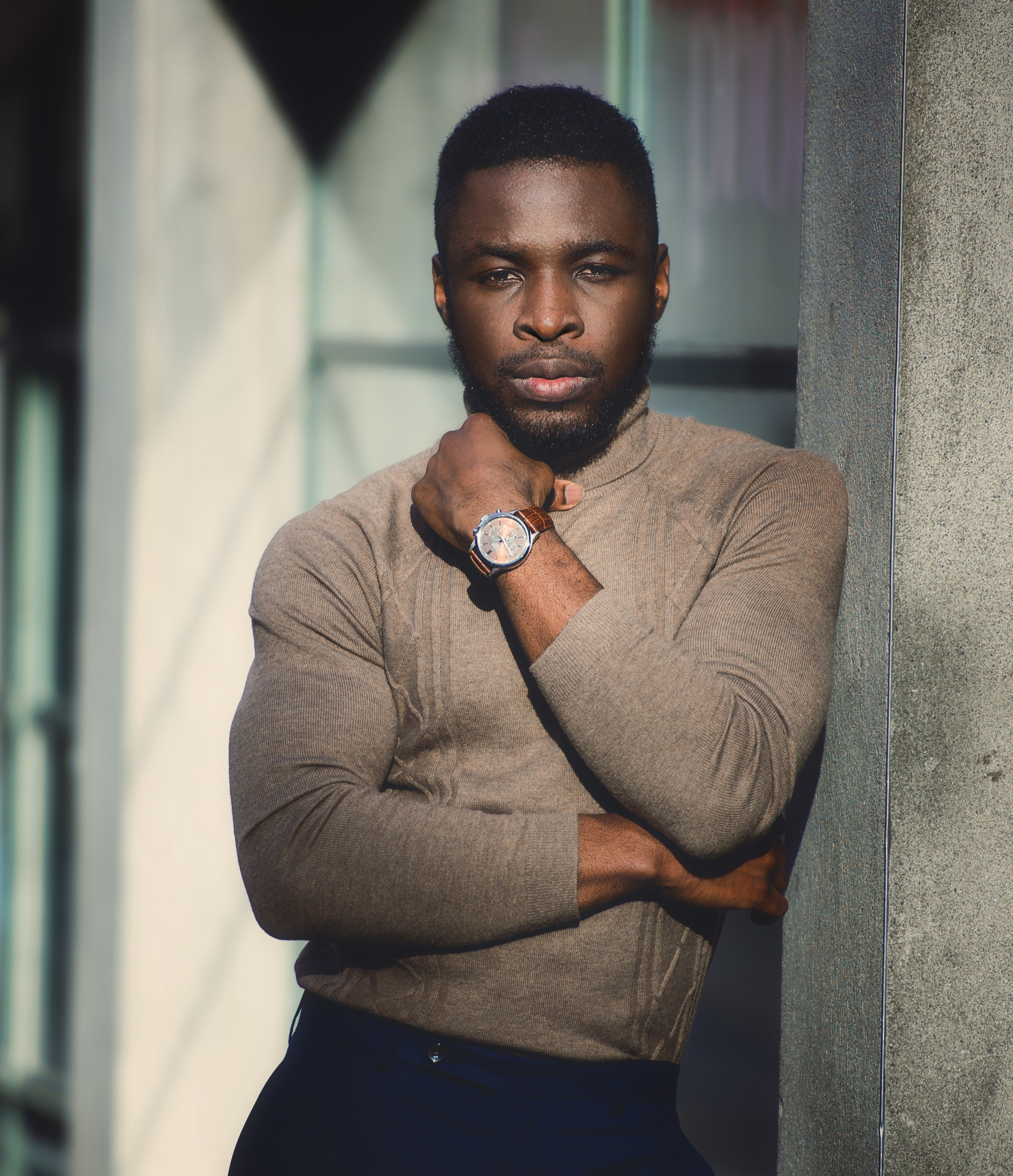
- Derek Ugochukwu
- Born: Port-Harcourt, Rivers State, Nigeria
- Education: Dún Laoghaire Institute of Art, Design and Technology
- Occupations: Film director Screenwriter
- Website: derekugochukwu.com

Derek Ugochukwu // (born 7 June 1991) is a Nigerian film director and screenwriter. He studied at Dun Laoghaire Institute Of Art Design and Technology in Dublin and was named one of Screen International Rising Stars of Ireland.

== Early life and education ==
Ugochukwu was born in Port-Harcourt, Rivers State. He is the third of six children raised in an Igbo Catholic family. He graduated with a 1st class master's degree in Screenwriting for Film & Television at Dún Laoghaire Institute of Art, Design and Technology (IADT). He also holds a master's degree in international management and global business awarded by the University of Limerick in 2014, making him a double master's holder.

== Career ==
In May 2020, Screen Ireland announced Ugochukwu as one of the successful 15 writers selected from a pool of 195 applicants for its inaugural Spotlight development scheme aimed at fostering new and diverse writing talent.

In January 2021, Ugochukwu was one of the successful 10 writers shortlisted from over 600 entries for the Virgin Media Discovers short film competition in partnership with Screen Ireland. ENGINE Shorts which aims to inspire and support up-and-coming writers, directors and producers in Limerick, Tipperary and Clare, announced Ugochukwu as one of the six winning directors selected to create inspiring, engaging world-class short films that resonate with a wide international audience.

To All My Darlings, a short film written by Ugochukwu, and starring Demi Isaac Oviawe, was shortlisted for the 2021 BAFTA Student Film Awards. It also won the Audience Award for Best Short at the 2021 Dublin International Film Festival. His directorial short film, You're Not Home, was nominated for an IFTA for Best Live-Action Short, screening at various prestigious international film festivals including Sitges Film Festival and SXSW.

== Filmography ==
=== Short film ===
Year	Title	Director	Writer	Executive Producer	Notes
2021	To All My Darlings	No	Yes	Yes	
2022	You're Not Home	Yes	Yes	No	
2023	Pediment	Yes	Yes	No	
2024	Nay Day	Yes	Yes	No	

== Awards and nominations ==
Year	Award	Category	Film	Result	Ref
2021	Dublin International Film Festival	Virgin Media Audience Award Shorts	To All My Darlings	Won	
2021	Catalyst International Film Festival	Spirit of the Festival Award	To All My Darlings	Won	
2021	British Academy of Film and Television Arts	Live Action Student Awards	To All My Darlings	Nominated	
2022	Galway Film Fleadh	Bingham Ray New Talent Award	You're Not Home	Nominated	
2022	SITGES Festival Internacional de Cinema Fantàstic de Catalunya	Brigadoon Paul Naschy Award	You're Not Home	Nominated	
2022	Richard Harris International Film Festival	Best Midwest Short Film	You're Not Home	Nominated	
2023	SXSW Film Festival	Grand Jury Award	You're Not Home	Nominated	
2023	Irish Film and Television Academy	Best Live-Action Short	You're Not Home	Nominated	
2024	Dublin International Film Festival	Discovery Award	Pediment	Nominated	
2024	Catalyst International Film Festival	Spirit of the Festival Award	Pediment	Won	
