= Angereds Teater =

Coordinates: 57°47′48.48″N 12°3′0.02″E

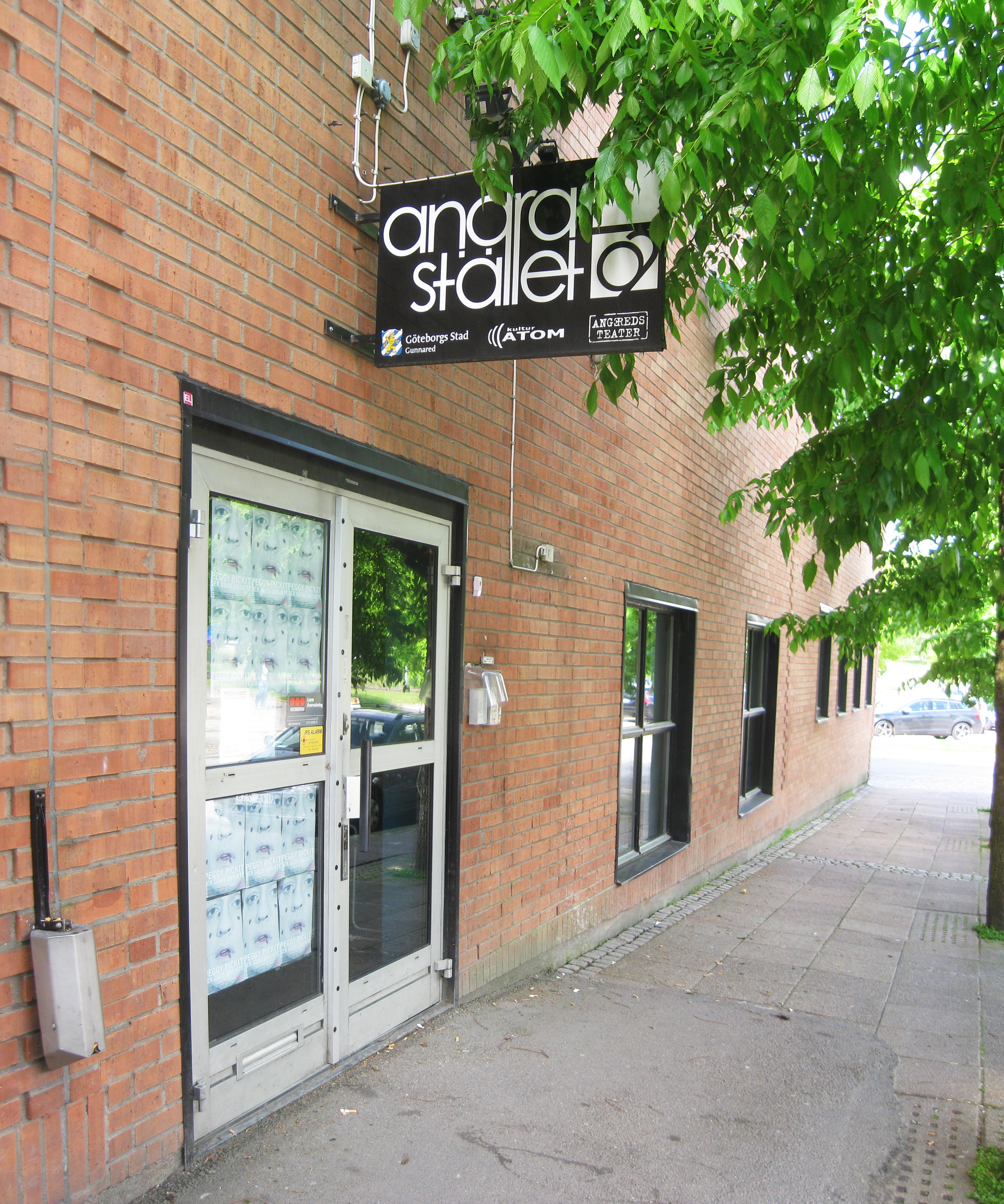
Angereds Teater

Angereds Teater is a theater and actors workshop located at Kulturhuset Blå Stället in the Angered suburb of Gothenburg, Sweden. Angereds Teater is a center of culture for the area, offers plays for both adults and children and hosting a number of plays and other events throughout the year.

Angereds Theater was founded in 1978 and was part of Gothenburg City Theatre until 1996. The theatre is part of Sweden's tradition of plays and other events especially for children, with a number of theatre and other artistic groups dedicated to this purpose. The theatre also offers Angereds Teaterskola featuring workshops for children with the aim of giving them an appreciation of the art.

Angereds Teater appeared as part of the Festival Internacional Cervantino in Mexico in 2011 as part of latter's programming for children. The theatre company presented "The Butterfly Pilots" (Fjärilspiloterna), a play is a story about loneliness and friendship, sudden falls and happy new beginnings to show that new friends appear when old ones go away.

The play was presented at the theatre in Gothenburg for over a year, with previous tours in Egypt and Syria. The play has extravagant scenery and in some parts, the audience can dance. The main performers of the play were Phax Said Cheik Ahamada, who has created a unique technique of breakdancing and Ami Skanberg Dahlstedt, who is known for combining dance styles from around the world into her work.
