= List of The Closer episodes =

The Closer premiered on June 13, 2005, and concluded on August 13, 2012. Each season is organized around a central theme, which drives both the criminal plot and Brenda's personal storyline. The crime story expands on an element of the theme and often parallels or mirrors events in Brenda's personal life.

The series concluded with its seventh season. That season contained 21 episodes, the final six of which transitioned the show into the continuation spin-off series, Major Crimes, with Mary McDonnell heading the cast as Captain Sharon Raydor.

== Series overview ==
Season	Episodes	Originally released	
Season	Episodes	First released	Last released
1	13	June 13, 2005	September 5, 2005
2	15	June 12, 2006	December 4, 2006
3	15	June 18, 2007	December 3, 2007
4	15	July 14, 2008	February 23, 2009
5	15	June 8, 2009	December 21, 2009
6	15	July 12, 2010	January 3, 2011
7	21	July 11, 2011	August 13, 2012

== Episodes ==
=== Season 1 (2005) ===
Season 1 opens with the LAPD's new Priority Murder Squad (PMS), soon renamed the Priority Homicide Division (PHD), under the direction of Deputy Chief Brenda Leigh Johnson investigating the murder of a technological genius. Brenda has recently joined LAPD after a long career in law enforcement, including with the Atlanta and Washington, D.C., Police Departments. It is soon revealed that Brenda is originally from Atlanta, Georgia, was CIA-trained, and was recruited by her former married lover, Assistant Chief Will Pope. Brenda is resented as an outsider by much of the LAPD and seen as an adversary by Robbery-Homicide's Captain Taylor, who initially persuades her squad to request transfers en masse in an unsuccessful effort to force Brenda's resignation. Brenda soon wins over her assistant, Sgt. David Gabriel, and the grudging admiration of the team when she shows them why she is called a closer; but her battle is far from over. As the season progresses, Brenda struggles to establish her authority and earn the respect of her squad, despite the efforts of Taylor and Detective Lt. Andy Flynn to undermine her authority and hamper her investigations. Slowly, one-by-one, Brenda wins over her team; and, by season's end, she has earned the loyalty of them all, even the hard-boiled Lt. Flynn, as they stand united against Capt. Taylor's final attempt to remove Brenda from the squad.

No. overall	No. in season	Title	Directed by	Written by	Original release date	U.S. viewers (millions)
1	1	"Pilot" (Note: Originally broadcast commercial free. Subsequent airings of the episode were edited to fit a one-hour slot with commercials.)	Michael M. Robin	James Duff	June 13, 2005	7.03
When an unidentified woman is found brutally murdered in the Hollywood home of a successful hi-tech millionaire, LAPD's newly appointed head of the Priority Murder Squad, Deputy Chief Brenda Johnson, finds herself challenged not only by the strangeness of the case, but by those who resent her appointment. Her honeyed Southern drawl only partially obscures her relentless and sometimes unscrupulous ways of closing cases. She proceeds to show her new and skeptical team the skills she learned as a CIA trained interrogator and begins to unravel the mystery behind the high-profile murder. But when she discovers that the accused killer and the victim have a lot more in common than anyone guessed, the case takes an unexpected twist that surprises even the most senior member of the squad.
2	2	"About Face"	Michael M. Robin	James Duff	June 20, 2005	5.57
Chief Johnson is suspicious of the conditions of the apparent natural death of a former model, but is frustrated by how long toxicology results will take. When the dead woman's philandering husband is finally found, she is further frustrated when it is discovered that the man everyone assumed was the husband's lawyer turns out to be his agent. Chief Johnson takes her frustrations to Chief Pope, and Capt. Taylor not only defends the detectives on her squad, but offers her an additional man, ". .one of our best guys." She also brings up "another issue": her squad's initials, prominently displayed on their new stationery, are "PMS".
3	3	"The Big Picture"	Elodie Keene	Nancy Miller	June 27, 2005	5.35
The murder of a Russian call girl is transferred to the newly re-christened Priority Homicide because her clients, now suspects in her murder, include high-profile VIPs. When the facts from her autopsy indicate her killer was over six feet tall, the suspect pool narrows dramatically. One suspect is a good friend of Pope's, and Pope insists on special handling. Another suspect is the Russian mobster who "imported" the young woman. But he has an ironclad alibi from the FBI, which Chief Johnson comes more and more to believe is false. (see also: "Fresh Pursuit").
4	4	"Show Yourself"	Michael M. Robin	Wendy West	July 4, 2005	3.78
When three members of a notorious Latino gang are gunned down in MacArthur Park, LA's Priority Homicide Division is brought in to investigate. It appears obvious that the shooter is a skilled sniper. Chief Johnson encounters someone who claims he can help her find the shooter, his son. Unfortunately, the shooting erupt into gang-on-gang violence, and two young boys become collateral damage.
5	5	"Flashpoint"	Craig Zisk	Rick Kellard	July 11, 2005	5.01
While administering an important drug test on a new anti-depressant to help addictive teenagers stay clean, a prominent doctor is murdered in his office. With the billion-dollar drug company refusing to cooperate and a growing list of suspects, Brenda and the Priority Homicide Division have their hands full. When Brenda disagrees with a member of her team over how to run the investigation, she finds her past coming back to haunt her, but as the allegations of her prior misconduct surface in the local press, Brenda discovers a suspect who has a dirty little secret of his own.
6	6	"Fantasy Date"	Greg Yaitanes	Roger Wolfson	July 18, 2005	4.91
When the daughter of a prominent Congresswoman is raped and murdered in her home, her ex reveals she was into drugs, role-playing, and sexual experimentation, but he's quickly ruled out as a suspect. When Pope refuses to hold the crime scene any longer, Brenda goes there and, while searching, is jumped by a man in a ski mask who tries to rape her. Meanwhile, Brenda settles in to her new home and has issues with the former owner's cat, who insists that she (the cat) lives there.
7	7	"You Are Here"	Gloria Muzio	Hunt Baldwin & John Coveny	July 25, 2005	5.21
Brenda finds her vaunted interrogation skills useless when the only witness to a murder is the victim's autistic son. His obsession with his normal routine causes problems when he goes into a panic over being late to his piano lesson, but she discovers another of his obsessions may help with the case - his desperate need to know where he is at all times.
8	8	"Batter Up"	Arvin Brown	James Duff	August 1, 2005	6.13
Captain Taylor is disgusted when the latest in a series of gay-bashings, which resulted in a murder, is re-assigned to Priority Homicide Division. When Brenda shows up at the crime scene with a sick cat ("Not mine, really, he just lives at my house"), Sgt Gabriel has one of the forensics guys take him to an emergency vet. Meanwhile, the detectives find the crime scene extremely compromised by the witnesses. Things get more complicated when Det Flynn gets a good lead on the phone and gives it to Taylor, who arrests the suspect while breaking all Brenda's rules of a "good arrest". She wants to surrender the case to Robbery-Homicide, but Pope insists that PHD continue the investigation. But, when the evidence and M/O of the suspect in the other attacks don't line up with this case, Brenda becomes suspicious that he's not the murderer.
9	9	"Good Housekeeping"	Michael M. Robin	Wendy West	August 8, 2005	5.39
Capt Taylor has been forced to apologize for his insubordination. When the teen-aged daughter of a maid in an affluent L.A. household is raped and murdered, the Priority Homicide Division is enlisted to find the girl's killer. Leads point to a registered sex offender, who subsequently commits suicide. The quest turns to trying to locate any other victims. But evidence surfaces that throws doubt on his guilt, and Brenda decides to search the home where the mother worked. Kitty, so named when Brenda was cornered on "his" name, is back home -- with a litter of kittens.
10	10	"The Butler Did It"	Tawnia McKiernan	Rick Kellard	August 15, 2005	5.11
Arriving to arrest a butler, who failed to show in court where he was on trial for the murder of his employer, the young widow of one of L.A.'s wealthiest men, Brenda and her squad find him dead, an apparent suicide. Since the Dutton children were effectively "disinherited" in favor of the widow, and since the Medical Examiner ruled that the butler couldn't have hanged himself, the DA asks Brenda to reopen the case of the widow's murder.
11	11	"LA Woman"	Rick Wallace	Hunt Baldwin & John Coveny	August 22, 2005	5.28
When a prominent Iranian businessman is gunned down, Brenda disagrees with the FBI over who will run the investigation. Reluctantly agreeing to work together, the FBI assigns Special Agent Fritz Howard to the case. Difficulties arise when Brenda discovers that the family observes conservative Islamic values and that the widow must ask permission from her son to speak to Brenda.
12	12	"Fatal Retraction"	Gloria Muzio	Story by : James Duff; Teleplay by : Wendy West and Roger Wolfson	August 29, 2005	5.77
When a body undergoing autopsy turns out to be the woman a suspected serial killer, Bill Croelick (Jason O'Mara), was convicted of killing three years previously, Priority Homicide must find out who was actually killed, but Croelick is released before they can. Flynn is back working with PHD, as he was the detective on the previous case, but suspicions that he may have "manipulated" the evidence arise. Tensions rise when Croelick begins stalking everyone connected with both cases, including Brenda.
13	13	"Standards and Practices"	Michael M. Robin	James Duff	September 5, 2005	6.39
After Brenda refused to rise to Taylor's bait -- unjustified suspicions he cast on Det. Flynn -- Flynn has applied for permanent transfer to PHD. An "anonymous" (everyone knows it's Taylor) complaint filed against Brenda for "conduct unbecoming" has thrown her for a loop. PHD is investigating the murder of a Hollywood producer, drowned in his Jacuzzi; the chief suspect is his wife, the daughter of a concert pianist. Ultimately, Capt. Taylor is forced by Chief Pope to withdraw his complaint when his humiliation is completed by the entire squad standing behind Chief Johnson.

=== Season 2 (2006) ===
In Season 2, Brenda is now established as leader of Priority Homicide, with her team firmly behind her.

No. overall	No. in season	Title	Directed by	Written by	Original release date	U.S. viewers (millions)
14	1	"Blue Blood"	Michael M. Robin	James Duff & Mike Berchem	June 12, 2006	8.28
Brenda investigates the murder of an LAPD officer while he was off duty, and Fritz pressures her for a decision on whether or not he can move in with her.
15	2	"Mom Duty"	Gloria Muzio	Wendy West	June 19, 2006	6.11
When a juror dies during a mob boss' trial, Brenda has to finesse her way to questioning the remaining jurors. An unannounced visit by Brenda's mother (Frances Sternhagen) delays Fritz moving in.
16	3	"Slippin'"	Elodie Keene	Hunt Baldwin & John Coveny	June 26, 2006	5.60
The shooting of three USC students, two fatally, has Brenda juggling responsibilities for entertaining her mother and solving the case.
17	4	"Aftertaste"	Arvin Brown	Steven Kane	July 3, 2006	5.30
The investigation into the murder of an owner of a trendy restaurant is complicated by Brenda's odd behavior.
18	5	"To Protect & to Serve"	Elodie Keene	Adam Belanoff	July 10, 2006	6.40
When Flynn and Provenza put sky box tickets over duty, the repercussions could bring the unit down after a body is discovered in Provenza's garage.
19	6	"Out of Focus"	Michael M. Robin	Hunt Baldwin & John Coveny	July 17, 2006	5.70
Brenda investigates the apparent suicide of a "stalkerazzo", and Fritz receives a disturbing phone call.
20	7	"Head Over Heels"	Matt Earl Beesley	Wendy West	July 24, 2006	6.63
Brenda's investigation into the murder of a porn star who was subsequently dismembered, brings up emotions that may or may not be related to the case. A pregnancy remains uncertain.
21	8	"Critical Missing"	Rick Wallace	James Duff & Mike Berchem	July 31, 2006	6.93
The discovery of the bodies of a Japanese woman and her daughter from an apparent murder/suicide, put the team on the trail of a possible multiple murderer.
22	9	"Heroic Measures"	Nelson McCormick	Adam Belanoff	August 7, 2006	6.40
A mother (and fourth-year medical student) accuses two highly-respected surgeons of the murder of her son, who was undergoing an apparently routine endoscopy at the time. Brenda insists on pursuing the accusation, with Chief Pope's support, when the hospital administrator appears to be stonewalling.
23	10	"The Other Woman"	Lesli Linka Glatter	Steven Kane	August 14, 2006	6.56
The death of a meth-head has Brenda looking at the Narcotics division, and a deposition may reveal a deeply held secret. Brenda is deposed as a character witness in Chief Pope's divorce.
24	11	"Borderline"	Rick Wallace	Hunt Baldwin & John Coveny	August 21, 2006	6.35
A fender-bender while she's on duty interferes with Brenda's investigation into an apparent triple murder with no bodies, that may have ties to illegal immigration.
25	12	"No Good Deed"	Charles Haid	James Duff & Wendy West	August 28, 2006	6.50
Brenda investigates the death of a teenager who was expected to testify that a man convicted of murdering a Korean couple was not actually the culprit; several unexpected twists in the case make her wonder if the boy was really going to tell the truth. Brenda has a very embarrassing and very public encounter with Estelle Pope.
26	13	"Overkill"	Michael M. Robin	James Duff & Adam Belanoff	September 4, 2006	7.60
The death of the wife of an FBI informant and the agent babysitting the couple puts Fritz in the role of peace keeper between the FBI Agent in charge and Brenda.
27	14	"Serving the King (Part 1)" (Note: Originally broadcast as a two-hour double episode.)	Arvin Brown	Hunt Baldwin & John Coveny	December 4, 2006	5.44
On administrative leave four months after the shoot-out in her murder room, Brenda is called upon by an old friend to solve the murder of a teenager with ties to a terrorist cell.
28	15	"Serving the King (Part 2)"	Kevin Bacon	James Duff & Mike Berchem	December 4, 2006	5.44
After being restored to command of the PHD, Brenda must make good her promise to find a member of the Army of Allah, whom the CIA desperately wants to interrogate regarding a shipment of missing plutonium. But it becomes apparent that the CIA has given her misleading information.

=== Season 3 (2007) ===
No. overall	No. in season	Title	Directed by	Written by	Original release date	U.S. viewers (millions)
29	1	"Homewrecker"	Michael M. Robin	James Duff & Mike Berchem	June 18, 2007	8.81
The squad investigates the brutal murder of a family, the only survivor being the son (Kyle Gallner), who soon becomes their main suspect. But things are not always as they seem when the father's secret emerges, leading to new suspects. Brenda fights against budget cuts in the LAPD.
30	2	"Grave Doubt"	Arvin Brown	John Coveny and Hunt Baldwin	June 25, 2007	6.45
The body of a long-dead murder victim is uncovered along with Lt. Provenza’s business card, setting off the squad’s search for his identity and killer. When the bullet is traced to a gang weapon that had been turned into the LAPD 15 years prior, Deputy Chief Johnson is forced to contend with political activist Father Jack and the echoes of past political unrest.
31	3	"Saving Face"	Michael Pressman	Adam Belanoff	July 2, 2007	7.19
At a retired cop’s funeral, Lt Provenza and Lt. Flynn discover something quite unexpected in the casket along with the corpse. Brenda has to deal with an irate bridezilla whose wedding was ruined by the investigation.
32	4	"Ruby" (Note: Originally broadcast as a 75 minute extended version. Subsequent airings of the episode were edited to fit a one-hour slot with commercials.)	Michael M. Robin	Story by : Mike Berchem; Teleplay by : Steven Kane	July 9, 2007	7.41
Recently released sex offender Roger Stimple is accused of kidnapping a child, and with time running out, Det. Gabriel beats a confession out of him. Deputy Chief Johnson must deal with Gabriel's actions while trying to gain a legally admissible confession from the suspect, leading her to turn to Cmdr. Taylor for help. (see also "Fresh Pursuit")
33	5	"The Round File"	Greer Shephard	Michael Alaimo	July 16, 2007	6.85
When a senior citizen (Orson Bean) appears at the precinct, claiming to have poisoned and killed six fellow senior citizens, Brenda is unconvinced by his confession. But, when she changes her mind, he takes back his claim. He tells Brenda that it's the retirement home staff who are poisoning people, leading to a manager with some sinister cost-cutting strategies. It's Brenda vs. The Machine as she tries repeatedly to fax an offer on a house to Fritz before someone else undercuts them.
34	6	"Dumb Luck"	Elodie Keene	Duppy Demetrius	July 23, 2007	7.29
A personal trainer is murdered while on a date with a married woman. Brenda suspects that her possessive husband may have hired a hitman to kill the deceased. However, the only witness to the murder is a valet parker diagnosed with OCD. Brenda and Provenza have to solve the case on their own while the rest of the squad undergo anti-terrorist training.
35	7	"Four to Eight"	Arvin Brown	Ken Martin	July 30, 2007	7.67
When two members of the Catorce street gang are shot to death, Brenda and her squad must solve the murders before a gang war erupts. Brenda has a personal health scare when she finally visits the doctor.
36	8	"Manhunt"	Rick Wallace	James Duff & Mike Berchem	August 6, 2007	7.53
A serial killer appears to have returned when two bodies turn up dead on a Los Angeles beach. With the knowledge that he kills in sets of three, Brenda and her squad must hunt down the killer before the third victim is taken. Note: Kyra Sedgwick submitted this episode for voting consideration for her Primetime Emmy Award nomination this season.
37	9	"Blindsided"	Kevin Bacon	John Coveny & Hunt Baldwin	August 13, 2007	7.36
In an effort to get good PR for the department, Deputy Chief Johnson takes a journalist on a ride-along. But when their car is targeted and shot at, Brenda is forced to live under 24-hour police protection, while being the key witness in the case she must solve.
38	10	"Culture Shock"	Elodie Keene	Adam Belanoff	August 20, 2007	7.72
When a Chinese business woman is found dead on the tour bus she and her husband operate, Brenda and the squad must dig deep to investigate her past life. Brenda's parents reveal to the squad that Brenda and Fritz are engaged. Brenda learns she has polycystic ovary syndrome, which is related to insulin resistance, so she must cut back on sweets – adding a recurring theme of Brenda hiding sweets for the rest of the series.
39	11	"Lover's Leap" (Note: Original title "Shredded.")	Jesse Bochco	Steven Kane	August 27, 2007	7.78
A car belonging to a Department of Homeland Security employee is found at the bottom of Mulholland Drive. Priority Homicide is brought in to uncover the details surrounding the driver's death, but the investigation leads Brenda a lot closer to home than she expected.
40	12	"'Til Death Do Us Part One"	Roger Young	Story by : James Duff; Teleplay by : Michael Alaimo	September 3, 2007	8.17
Deputy Chief Johnson's investigation into a famous Hollywood divorce attorney found floating in his swimming pool is under heavy scrutiny. Fritz and Brenda are trying to consolidate their financial affairs, leading Brenda to discover a secret Fritz has been keeping.
41	13	"'Til Death Do Us Part Two"	Michael M. Robin	Story by : James Duff; Teleplay by : Duppy Demetrius	September 10, 2007	9.21
Under intense pressure, Brenda has forty-eight hours to break a new witness' alibi and get her case back on track. Brenda's relationship with Fritz is in danger as she reveals she's learned Fritz' long-kept secret.
42	14	"Next of Kin, Part 1"	Scott Ellis	Story by : Mike Berchem; Teleplay by : Hunt Baldwin & John Coveny	December 3, 2007	6.05
At Christmas, Brenda and Fritz struggle to find a buyer for their home. When a violent bank robbery leads Brenda's prime suspect to flee to Atlanta, Brenda and Fritz find themselves houseguests in her parents home, where Brenda finds herself torn between duty to job and family. Even more unexpected is the arrival of Flynn and Provenza!
43	15	"Next of Kin, Part 2"	James Duff	Story by : Mike Berchem; Teleplay by : Adam Belanoff & James Duff	December 3, 2007	6.05
Brenda, Fritz, her parents, Flynn and Provenza, and her prime suspect hit the road back to Los Angeles in her parents' motor home. But Brenda's tactics used to gain the cooperation of her witness lead to an unforeseen outcome, shocking her parents.

=== Season 4 (2008–09) ===
The theme for Season Four is power. Brenda and the Priority Homicide Division deal with the power of the media this season, when a Los Angeles Times reporter shadows them, but with an agenda all his own. The power of the legal system, and those who both use and abuse it are explored throughout the season, as is the power that gun violence exerts on lives. On the personal front, Brenda must confront the power plays that come as she and Fritz begin planning their wedding, with a bit of help from Clay and Willie Rae Johnson.

Unlike the previous three seasons, Season Four ran for 10 summer episodes, concluding September 15, 2008, and returned in January, 2009 with five additional episodes.

No. overall	No. in season	Title	Directed by	Written by	Original release date	U.S. viewers (millions)
44	1	"Controlled Burn"	Michael M. Robin	James Duff & Mike Berchem	July 14, 2008	7.81
Brenda and the PHD investigate a fire in Griffith Park while reluctantly being shadowed by LA Times reporter Ricardo Ramos. Things get complicated when a body is found in the burn zone and Ramos becomes involved in the case. At the same time, Brenda and Fritz settle into their new home, but have an unexpected, and very unwelcome visitor from Brenda's professional past – one who is connected to Brenda's current case.
45	2	"Speed Bump"	Arvin Brown	Hunt Baldwin & John Coveny	July 21, 2008	7.06
When the murderer of the daughter of a wealthy producer was paroled after eight years, her mother initiated a campaign of harassment against the man, now living in a halfway house. When the man turns up dead, Priority Homicide must investigate, with the girl's parents soon their prime suspects.
46	3	"Cherry Bomb"	Rick Wallace	Michael Alaimo	July 28, 2008	7.36
When a young girl testifying in a sexual assault case against the son of a Sheriff's Department Commander is found hanged in her bedroom, an apparent suicide, Commander Taylor calls in Brenda's squad. The investigation uncovers the son's startling hobby known as "cherry picking".
47	4	"Live Wire"	Elodie Keene	Steven Kane	August 4, 2008	7.86
A man wearing a wire as part of the investigation of a drug ring is shot to death in a downtown alley. Brenda soon discovers LA Times reporter Ramos is involved in the case and Brenda's personal and professional lives overlap when the PHD and the FBI fight over jurisdiction. Daniels and Gabriel's breakup comes to a public crisis.
48	5	"Dial M For Provenza"	Arvin Brown	Adam Belanoff	August 11, 2008	6.42
Brenda sends an unlikely homme fatale, Lt. Provenza, undercover to sting a woman (Jennifer Coolidge) attempting to murder her husband. But when the evidence from the sting is stolen and the husband is murdered, things get complicated for Flynn and Provenza. It's up to Brenda and the PHD to recover the evidence and solve the case.
49	6	"Problem Child"	Scott Ellis	Duppy Demetrius	August 18, 2008	6.44
After a troubled 13-year-old adopted boy disappears, Brenda must decide whether he should be treated as a runaway or an abduction. The further into the case she goes, the more suspicious the child seems, and Brenda begins to question if the missing boy is a victim or a potential killer.
50	7	"Sudden Death"	Kevin Bacon	Hunt Baldwin & John Coveny	August 25, 2008	7.41
A case becomes personal when Det. Julio Sanchez's brother is shot and killed. Brenda finds herself caught between finding the shooter and controlling Sanchez, who appears bent on his own form of justice.
51	8	"Split Ends"	Roxann Dawson	Ken Martin & Mike Berchem	September 1, 2008	8.05
Brenda and the team must investigate the movie set murder of a hairdresser. It soon appears the woman's abusive husband may be the killer. In the meantime, Brenda must deal with her father, who is eager to begin planning her wedding.
52	9	"Tijuana Brass"	Anthony Hemingway	James Duff & Mike Berchem	September 8, 2008	7.44
Two Tijuana police officers are found murdered in LA. Their possible link to a drug cartel leads to questions as to whether the two men were murdered or killed in self defense. An LA Times article attacking the Priority Homicide Division's caseload forces Chief Pope to prepare to deploy damage control by dismantling Priority Homicide. (see also "Fresh Pursuit")
53	10	"Time Bomb"	Michael M. Robin	Steven Kane	September 15, 2008	7.63
When a teen bomber-to-be is discovered dead, the newly renamed Major Crimes Division (MCD) becomes involved in the investigation of the bomber's intent. Political pressure mounts to call the case closed after the victim's apparent target is identified, but Brenda soon interprets a mysterious clue that leads to a murderous conspiracy putting Brenda, her squad, and Fritz in mortal danger as they try to defuse the lethal situation.
54	11	"Good Faith"	Elodie Keene	Adam Belanoff	January 26, 2009	6.24
Set at least a month after the preceding episode, Brenda and the team, including a mostly recovered Sanchez, investigate the death of a man after Dr. Morales testily points out inconsistencies in the evidence that call into question the original finding of suicide. Among the suspects are his cancer-stricken ex-girlfriend and his church pastor. Brenda's parents visit as Brenda and Fritz prepare for their wedding, and Brenda must confront her feelings for her father when his health is suddenly threatened.
55	12	"Junk in the Trunk"	Scott Ellis	Duppy Demetrius & Leo Geter	February 2, 2009	5.37
Brenda and the team investigate the death of a morbidly obese man who was found dead in a car trunk. The main suspect is his current girlfriend, who turns out to be an illusionist (her euphemism for "transvestite") with an interest in diamonds and deadly motives of her own.
56	13	"Power of Attorney"	Rick Wallace	Michael Alaimo	February 9, 2009	5.44
Brenda meets her match in Phillip Stroh, a threatening and manipulative defense attorney, whose client is accused of raping several women and murdering one. As the case unravels, it appears the client may actually be a victim, which could lead to the team losing its first case.
57	14	"Fate Line"	James Duff	Steven Kane	February 16, 2009	5.89
Brenda's clairvoyant soon to be sister-in-law (Amy Sedaris) comes to town for Brenda and Fritz's wedding. She soon becomes involved as Brenda and the team may need to prevent another murder before it occurs.
58	15	"Double Blind"	Matthew Penn	Ken Martin & Leo Geter	February 23, 2009	6.01
Brenda and Fritz, each distracted by different cases, prepare for their wedding. Brenda focuses on the case as her team tries to convince her to take time, be happy, and enjoy the time she has with her new husband. Claire, Clay and Willie Ray work to make the night perfect for Brenda and Fritz.

=== Season 5 (2009) ===
The theme for Season Five is change. Brenda must adapt to the changes that come: as she begins a new life as a married woman, when she loses her beloved Kitty, and when Fritz brings home a new kitten named Joel. Also this season, the Major Crimes Division must adjust to the departure of Det. Irene Daniels. There's change in Lt. Provenza's life as well, when he becomes involved with a much-younger woman with some new ideas, much to Lt. Flynn's chagrin. Change isn't all good for Sgt. Gabriel, who pays the price for his role in Daniels' transfer. An officer-involved shooting brings a new figure into the lives of the MCD: the formidable Capt. Sharon Raydor of Force Investigation who is not at all impressed by Chief Johnson's approach to policing. Lt. Provenza's first name is revealed.

No. overall	No. in season	Title	Directed by	Written by	Original release date	U.S. viewers (millions)
59	1	"Products of Discovery"	Michael M. Robin	Michael Alaimo	June 8, 2009	7.14
Brenda and the MCD investigate the murder of four members of a family, for which the father/husband appears to be the perpetrator. But an address mix-up soon connects the murder to an FBI case. The team starts to notice Provenza's weird behavior.
60	2	"Blood Money"	Rick Wallace	Steven Kane	June 15, 2009	6.47
Brenda and the MCD investigate the disappearance of a financial advisor who stole millions from innocent people. In Brenda's personal life, things are difficult with an ailing Kitty.
61	3	"Red Tape"	Rick Wallace	Duppy Demetrius	June 22, 2009	6.41
Sgt. Gabriel comes under investigation for shooting a homicide suspect when the facts don't add up. The internal investigation led by Captain Sharon Raydor gets in the way of the original murder investigation, leaving the entire team tied up in knots. Brenda finally accepts that she must say goodbye to Kitty.
62	4	"Walking Back the Cat"	Steve Robin	Leo Geter	June 29, 2009	6.29
With things slow at Major Crimes, Brenda lets herself be persuaded by Fritz to assist the FBI in quietly finding a person of interest who has been missing for a month. When he's found dead in the morgue, circumstances require the members of MCD to be temporarily deputized to the FBI. The squad meets Provenza's significantly younger girlfriend; Kitty's ashes keep intruding into Brenda's investigation.
63	5	"Half Load"	Roxann Dawson	Ken Martin & Mike Berchem	July 6, 2009	6.05
When a reformed gang member is murdered, the case takes the team back to a familiar neighborhood where they find themselves unwelcome. Brenda must figure out a way to solve what appears to have been a missed-mark murder and bring peace to an unstable community. It is revealed that Brenda is still obsessed with the Phillip Stroh case with a case board in her guest bedroom.
64	6	"Tapped Out"	Adam Arkin	Adam Belanoff	July 13, 2009	6.59
Chief Pope joins Provenza and Flynn for a ride along, as "just one of the guys" to see "what you guys do on a daily basis". His day starts badly at the murder scene of an internet dating legend when the first detective on scene, "Richard Tracy", volunteers to log the evidence and Pope accepts. Unfortunately, "Tracy" is a semi-deranged imposter. The MCD must follow along, always one step behind, trying to retrieve the evidence.
65	7	"Strike Three"	Nelson McCormick	Steven Kane	July 20, 2009	6.60
Brenda crosses paths again with Captain Sharon Raydor when a gunfight kills two police officers and a teenage boy. The subsequent rift comes crashing full force into the team's case involving white supremacists.
66	8	"Elysian Fields"	Nicole Kassell	Michael Alaimo	July 27, 2009	7.45
When a man believed to have murdered two young women is found dead in Elysian Fields, evidence points to his victims' families. An old detective comes out of retirement to help Brenda and the team wade through the suspects to find the true killer. Brenda's worries about the Stroh case intensify as she starts having nightmares about him.
67	9	"Identity Theft"	Rick Wallace	Story by : Ken Martin; Teleplay by : James Duff & Steven Kane	August 3, 2009	6.98
Brenda must reopen the case of a murdered homeopathist when a man maintains that he committed the act and supplies an account of events that doesn't corroborate the actual story. Brenda is certain of a cover-up and sets out to find the truth. As the investigation heats up, Brenda gets a visit from her mother and troublesome teenage niece, Charlene ("it's Charlie now . . no one calls me Charlene anymore".).
68	10	"Smells Like Murder"	Michael M. Robin	Duppy Demetrius	August 10, 2009	6.95
The discovery of a large container with human remains has Chief Brenda Johnson scrambling to find the killer and gets more than she bargained for. The list of suspects includes an upset ex-fiancée, a tenant-hating landlord, a bible-quoting step dad, and a too-generous best friend. With one of her team preparing for a crucial exam, Brenda decides to make the investigation like a class-room lesson. In the meantime, Charlie, Brenda’s niece, attempts an outlandish deed that may get her sent packing.
69	11	"Maternal Instincts"	David McWhirter	Leo Geter	August 17, 2009	7.31
Brenda and the MCD look into a school parking lot shooting killing one and leaving another in a critical condition.
70	12	"Waivers of Extradition"	Kevin Bacon	Adam Belanoff	August 24, 2009	7.39
A Texan serial killer performs his works in Los Angeles, and Brenda and the MCD work with an El Paso detective to bring him to justice. Brenda's father, Clay, comes to get Brenda's niece, Charlie, to bring her back to Atlanta.
71	13	"The Life"	Steve Robin	Hunt Baldwin & John Coveny	December 7, 2009	6.18
A 12-year-old boy is found murdered in a gang hangout, then two gang members from the same gang are also murdered. Brenda and the MCD fear a gang war is about to break out. Soon, the hunt for a missing girl who may have been involved uncovers a much more painful crime, and the hard realities of multi-generational gang life. Fritz brings home an early Christmas gift for Brenda, an orange stripy kitten named Joel.
72	14	"Make Over"	Rick Wallace	Michael Alaimo	December 14, 2009	5.45
When a forensic lab is decertified, an old case of Provenza's is re-opened. Returning to LA to lend a hand is Provenza's retired partner, George Andrews, who has made some radical changes in his life since Provenza saw him last. Complicating the investigation: the MCD must get creative when George is unable to testify, and Provenza must cope with the changes around him, and the team learning his biggest secret: his first name.
73	15	"Dead Man's Hand"	James Duff	Duppy Demetrius & Ken Martin	December 21, 2009	5.97
Captain Sharon Raydor returns with a request for the Major Crimes Division. At the same time, Brenda must deal with Fritz's eccentric behavior.

=== Season 6 (2010–11) ===
The theme for Season Six is attraction. The season-long story arc is a shuffle in the highest echelons of the LAPD when the Chief of Police announces his retirement.

No. overall	No. in season	Title	Directed by	Written by	Original release date	U.S. viewers (millions)
74	1	"The Big Bang"	Rick Wallace	James Duff & Mike Berchem	July 12, 2010	7.66
The investigation into the murder of a man who loved to take pictures of stars from the privacy of his own balcony leads Brenda and the squad to think there may be a close connection to the woman with whom he was having an affair. A few unanticipated problems arise including a missing murder weapon and the squad's move into a new building.
75	2	"Help Wanted"	Nelson McCormick	Steven Kane	July 19, 2010	6.97
Brenda and her squad must find out why a nanny disappeared and if the mayor's friends were somehow connected to the disappearance. Captain Sharon Raydor joins Brenda in the investigation, but when Brenda tries to determine the motive behind the Captain's assistance, she comes upon something she did not expect.
76	3	"In Custody"	Michael M. Robin	Michael Alaimo	July 26, 2010	6.75
As the squad is busy looking into a suicide, they also get into the middle of a dispute between a dying husband and his wife who is addicted to crystal meth. Brenda learns that if Assistant Chief Pope is selected as the next Chief of Police it could lead to a promotion for her, leaving Commander Taylor to take over the MCD. Brenda must also control Sanchez' overwhelming paternal instincts leaking out over Ruben and creating mayhem in the workplace.
77	4	"Layover"	Steve Robin	Adam Belanoff	August 2, 2010	6.94
When Provenza and Flynn pick up flight attendants on their way back from extraditing a prisoner, Provenza finds a dead man in the bathtub of one of the stewardesses. Brenda tells Chief Pope of her intentions to apply for the open Chief of Police position.
78	5	"Heart Attack"	Roxann Dawson	Ken Martin	August 9, 2010	7.21
As the team picks up a case involving body parts of likely gang members found in plastic bags, they discover that Brenda has thrown her hat into the ring to be the next Chief of Police. Provenza and Tao worry about Sanchez' fading enthusiasm for finding Ruben's mother.
79	6	"Off the Hook"	Michael M. Robin	Duppy Demetrius	August 16, 2010	6.82
When an emergency phone call to Major Crimes Division is cut short, and the caller, head of the state parole board, is found dead, Chief Pope is irate at MCD's perceived bungling. When he challenges the way Brenda handled the case, he calls her bluff and decides to take over the investigation, fearing a public relations disaster. Everyone starts noticing abnormal changes to Chief Pope's behavior as his lack of tact during the investigation could remove Pope's name as a candidate for the new Chief of Police.
80	7	"Jump the Gun"	David McWhirter	Leo Geter	August 23, 2010	7.04
In the aftermath of a bank robbery gone wrong, the FBI's new liaison officer to the Major Crimes Division doesn't make Brenda's life easier, though it leaves wonders if it is a sign that Brenda is in the lead to be the new Chief of Police. Chief Pope learns he is not on the short list, and begins to think that the FBI may actually be plotting against Brenda by promoting a liaison officer which may compromise her candidacy.
81	8	"War Zone"	Steve Robin	Michael Alaimo	August 30, 2010	7.61
A drive-by shooting of three soldiers who had just returned from Afghanistan gets the military involved since the case has potential terrorist overtones. But Brenda doesn't react positively to heavy-handed interference with a case that, to her, is so clearly gang-related. (see also "Fresh Pursuit", ep 7.10)
82	9	"Last Woman Standing"	Stacey K. Black	Steven Kane	September 6, 2010	7.92
The Major Crimes Division investigates the murder of an actress who was using an online dating service, and Brenda immediately suspects a serial dater who was with the victim the night she was murdered. Captain Sharon Raydor, Chief Pope and Commander Taylor encourage Brenda to rethink her decision to withdraw her candidacy for Chief of Police.
83	10	"Executive Order"	Michael M. Robin	Adam Belanoff	September 13, 2010	7.21
The Major Crimes Division must stop a deranged man from detonating a massive explosive at the memorial of two murdered paramedics. Brenda is helped by Tommy Delk (Courtney B. Vance) of the Counter Terrorism Bureau, who is also on the short list for the next Chief of Police. Brenda takes extreme measures in solving the case by putting some of her colleagues at risk, as well as making an important command decision that may be the deciding factor that results in Delk becoming the new Chief. Note: Second of five appearances in The Closer universe by Los Angeles City Councilor, later Mayor of Los Angeles Eric Garcetti, as the fictional Los Angeles Mayor Ramon Quintero. Garcetti is seen standing beside the character of outgoing LAPD Chief of Police Edward J. Thompson, who is played by his father, former LA District Attorney Gil Garcetti, reprising (uncredited in this episode) the role he played (credited) in this season’s opening episode: “The Big Bang”. Eric Garcetti also appeared in "The Big Bang", standing in the background behind, alternately, Pope and Thompson as they address the media.
84	11	"Old Money"	Nelson McCormick	Hunt Baldwin & John Coveny	December 6, 2010	5.82
Lieutenant Flynn is attacked on the street following an Alcoholics Anonymous meeting and calls Captain Sharon Raydor for help. Brenda attempts to focus on both her case and helping Flynn, who is falsely charged with witness tampering after Captain Raydor opens an internal affairs investigation.
85	12	"High Crimes"	Nicole Kassell	Ralph Gifford & Carson Moore	December 13, 2010	5.46
Chief Delk assigns MCD an armed robbery case involving several marijuana dispensaries. As the team takes over the case, the most recent robbery results in a murder. During the investigation, Brenda is pressured by both Chief Delk and Fritz to consider accepting an offer to take over Chief Pope's position.
86	13	"Living Proof (Part 1)"	Rick Wallace	Leo Geter	December 20, 2010	5.40
It's the day before Christmas Eve, and a case arises that falls somewhere in the grey area between MCD and FID. Brenda and Captain Raydor agree (more or less) to share the case, in the hopes of wrapping it up before it interferes with everyone's more-or-less un-cancellable holiday plans. Brenda's parents are in town for the holidays, with a big announcement that means they will have "all the time in the world" to catch up.
87	14	"Living Proof (Part 2)"	James Duff	Michael Alaimo & Steven Kane	December 27, 2010	6.51
Brenda and MCD must put all the pieces together after a mistake with a DNA test reveals a secret that could be the key to solving the case. Fritz and Brenda must deal with a crime that Brenda's parents consider a top priority.
88	15	"An Ugly Game"	Sheelin Choksey	Duppy Demetrius	January 3, 2011	6.63
The arrest of a crack addict, and the discovery of keys to a Mercedes in his possession, leads Brenda's squad on a race to find the missing woman who was driving the car; Gabriel questions Brenda's judgment; Fritz reveals some ugly truths about addicts, addiction, and his own personal past as an addict.

=== Season 7 (2011–12) ===
The theme for Season Seven is love and loss. Throughout the season, events are overshadowed by a lawsuit against Deputy Chief Johnson over the events that transpired with Turrell Baylor at the conclusion of last season's "War Zone" (Season 6, episode 8). This season is also the final season of the series before story moves to the continuation spin-off series, Major Crimes, through a transition set of six (16-21) episodes.

No. overall	No. in season	Title	Directed by	Written by	Original release date	U.S. viewers (millions)
89	1	"Unknown Trouble"	Nelson McCormick	Michael Alaimo	July 11, 2011	7.23
Chief Delk begins to establish his hierarchy. Brenda and the LAPD are sued by Turrell Baylor's family (Season 6 episode 8), while MCD investigates the killing of a rapper in his own home, scrutinizing his party guests.
90	2	"Repeat Offender"	Steve Robin	Steven Kane	July 18, 2011	6.47
In the wake of the sudden and unexpected death of Chief Delk, the mayor appoints Will Pope as Interim Chief, dashing Commander Taylor's ambitions for a serious jump in rank. The team investigates the death of a house sitter. Capt. Raydor continues, under protest, her audit of MCD regarding the civil suit filed by the Baylor family, and under direct orders from Pope.
91	3	"To Serve With Love"	Michael Pressman	Adam Belanoff	July 25, 2011	6.15
Lieutenants Flynn and Provenza get into trouble while moonlighting as process servers when a man dies shortly after they serve him. A question of the man's identity ensues.
92	4	"Under Control"	Rick Wallace	Duppy Demetrius	August 1, 2011	6.55
The team searches for a missing boy at a camp where Lieutenant Tao's son works. Capt. Raydor's audit of MCD continues.
93	5	"Forgive Us Our Trespasses"	Roxann Dawson	Leo Geter & Jim Leonard	August 8, 2011	6.50
A family works to protect their late minister's reputation from scandal. Most of the MCD is subpoenaed by the Baylor (Season 6 episode 8) family's attorney, raising suspicions about the one member of the squad who wasn't – Detective Gabriel. Brenda begins to crack under the pressure.
94	6	"Home Improvement"	Sheelin Choksey	James Duff & Mike Berchem	August 15, 2011	6.73
The body of a convicted sex offender turns up on a home construction site; Brenda and Fritz weigh the expense of a high-priced attorney (Mark Pellegrino).
95	7	"A Family Affair"	Anthony Hemingway	Michael Alaimo	August 22, 2011	6.57
The squad investigates the suspicious death of a fellow law enforcement officer's daughter; Capt. Raydor focuses her efforts on Detective Sanchez.
96	8	"Death Warrant"	Steve Robin	Steven Kane	August 29, 2011	6.83
Brenda seeks Capt. Raydor's help in an investigation of possible police brutality; Brenda's attorney starts deposing the squad about the Baylor case.
97	9	"Star Turn"	Stacey K. Black	Leo Geter	September 5, 2011	7.17
The father of a young new video sensation is found dead after being reported missing a week earlier. Brenda and the LAPD investigate whether it was an accident, suicide, or murder. Brenda must decide if she will accept a settlement in the Baylor case.
98	10	"Fresh Pursuit"	Michael M. Robin	Adam Belanoff	September 12, 2011	6.15
The team investigates the murder of a deputy sheriff by a car-theft ring. In the Baylor case, the court grants a summary judgment dismissing the Baylor family's case and Baylor attorney Goldman immediately files a federal suit for multiple civil rights violations since Brenda joined the LAPD, citing cases where her deliberate actions condemned suspects to extrajudicial killings: Nikolai Koslov ("The Big Picture"), Roger Stimple ("Ruby"), Mexican police inspector Martin Vasquez ("Tijuana Brass"), and Baylor ("War Zone") and also mentioning the suicide in the office on the case just concluded and her continual harassment of Phillip Stroh.
99	11	"Necessary Evil"	Nelson McCormick	Duppy Demetrius	November 28, 2011	5.40
The shooting of a high school principal leads Brenda and her team to investigate the school's football coach. After Capt. Raydor tells Chief Pope and MCD that she is accepting an outside job offer, the Baylor family's attorney comments on it within a short time, finally confirming that there is indeed a leak in the MCD.
100	12	"You Have the Right to Remain Jolly"	Rick Wallace	James Duff & Michael Alaimo	December 5, 2011	4.85
Brenda and her team investigate the suspicious zipline death of a Kris Kringle at a Christmas village run by Santa Jack (Fred Willard). Buzz Watson's very attractive sister, Casey Watson (Christine Woods), catches the eye of the men in the team. Brenda finds out who actually paid her attorney's retainer.
101	13	"Relative Matters"	David McWhirter	Ken Martin	December 12, 2011	5.30
A man is found dead in his car shortly after he was badly beaten by a man under FBI surveillance; Brenda finds it difficult to focus on the investigation after her father gives her some bad news.
102	14	"Road Block"	Nelson McCormick	Jim Leonard	December 19, 2011	5.81
The police commissioner's wife tries to cover up her DWI, which resulted in the death of a college girl.
103	15	"Silent Partner"	Arvin Brown	James Duff & Mike Berchem	December 26, 2011	6.16
There is a murder related to Turrell Baylor's death; Brenda seeks the help of a businessman with old ties to the neighborhood; Brenda's lawyer and the Baylor family lawyer face off over the latest murder and settlement of the Baylor case.
104	16	"Hostile Witness"	Steve Robin	Steven Kane	July 9, 2012	6.15
Brenda faces twisted attorney (and presumed rapist and murderer) Phillip Stroh, who is representing a rapist whom the MCD apprehended. When Brenda tries an unorthodox strategy to gain more time to find the rapist's partner, she incurs the wrath of the ADA and discovers how the Johnson Rule has weakened her position in the LAPD.
105	17	"Fool's Gold"	Jon Tenney	Ralph Gifford & Carson Moore	July 16, 2012	6.36
Brenda's team must catch a thieving duo after they rob a jewelry store right under the noses, and red faces, of Flynn and Provenza (trying to buy back his first ex-wife's wedding ring).
106	18	"Drug Fiend"	Paul McCrane	Duppy Demetrius	July 23, 2012	5.84
An oncologist is murdered in his clinic. Brenda investigates even as she worries about her own father's cancer. Detective Gabriel's season long girlfriend, and potential fiancée, Ann Mason is introduced.
107	19	"Last Rites"	David McWhirter	Leo Geter	July 30, 2012	5.77
While Brenda's mother and ailing father visit, she and her team investigate the murder of a priest who had come to an apartment to deliver last rites.
108	20	"Armed Response"	Michael M. Robin	Steven Kane & Jim Leonard	August 6, 2012	6.00
A veteran working as a security guard is shot dead in front of an abandoned house, where MCD finds evidence of sexual activity. Brenda returns from her mother's funeral and takes over the case. Capt. Raydor discovers the (unaware) source of the leak in the department.
109	21	"The Last Word"	Michael M. Robin	James Duff & Mike Berchem	August 13, 2012	9.08
When a frantic 911 call (made by Rusty Beck) leads Brenda and the team to Phillip Stroh's burial grounds, she must employ extreme means to close the case. Passed over for Assistant Chief of Police in favor of Commander Taylor, suspended, nearly fired, and still reprimanded despite apprehending Stroh while saving her and Rusty's lives, Brenda chooses to retire from the LAPD and take a job as Chief of the LA County District Attorney Bureau of Investigation. Note: Episode 1.1 of Major Crimes was broadcast immediately following this final episode.

== See also ==
- List of Major Crimes episodes
