= Desolation Angels =

Desolation Angels may refer to:

- Desolation Angels (novel), a 1965 novel by Jack Kerouac
- Desolation Angels (album), a 1979 album by Bad Company
- Desolation Angels (1982 film), a 1982 Australian film
- Desolation Angels (1995 film), a 1995 American film
- Desolation Angels (band)
