= Jonathan Del Arco =

American actor (born 1966)

- Born: March 7, 1966 (age 60); Uruguay
- Occupations: Actor, political activist
- Known for: Star Trek: The Next Generation and Picard; The Closer and Major Crimes; and Nip/Tuck
- Height: 170 cm (5 ft 7 in)
- Spouse: Kyle Fritz

Jonathan Del Arco (born March 7, 1966) is an Uruguayan American actor and gay rights and political activist. He is best known for his role as Hugh the Borg in Star Trek: The Next Generation and Star Trek: Picard, and for his series regular role as medical examiner Dr. Morales in The Closer and Major Crimes. He was awarded the 2013 Visibility Award by the Human Rights Campaign.

== Career ==
As a teenager, Del Arco became interested in acting and the theater. He often traveled by commuter train from his home in Port Chester, New York to Manhattan, where he attended plays. He eventually enrolled in acting classes there, and after graduating from high school, he moved to New York City permanently. Shortly after, Del Arco won a role in the touring company of Torch Song Trilogy.

In 1990, with a role on the Miami Vice television show and a role in the independent film Lost Angeles under his belt, Del Arco moved to Los Angeles, California. Guest starring roles on the television series True Colors, Sisters, The Wonder Years, and Blossom as well as a small role in the film The Mambo Kings followed. His most notable role during this period was as the Borg drone "Hugh" on Star Trek: The Next Generation in 1992, which he reprised in 1993 and again in 2020.

Del Arco has appeared in a wide range of live theatrical plays. His New York theater debut came in 1987 in Milcha Sanchez-Scott's Roosters at the INTAR Theatre. Theater critic Mel Gussow called his a "most sensitive performance", and said his debut was "auspicious". His Broadway theater debut followed in 1988, when he understudied and then played Martin in Michael Weller's play Spoils of War at the Music Box Theatre, replacing Christopher Collet. This was followed in 1990 by an off-Broadway role in John Jesurun's Everything That Rises Must Converge at the Kitchen Theatre Company.

Del Arco's other stage performances include Amulets Against the Dragon Forces by Paul Zindel, House Arrest by Anna Deavere Smith, The Virgin Molly by Quincy Long, Common Infractions / Gross Injustices (produced by American Repertory Theater), and Blood Wedding by Federico García Lorca.

In 1996, Del Arco joined the Hispanic Playwrights Project at the South Coast Repertory and spent six seasons there. He also spent the summers of 1998 and 1999 at the Institute on the Arts and Civic Dialogue at Harvard University, working under Anna Deavere Smith.

His breakout role came in 2003 when he landed a recurring guest star role FX Networks's series Nip/Tuck, playing a transgender woman named Sofia Lopez. Roles on other highly rated shows such as 24, The Sopranos, and Dollhouse followed. Beginning in 2007, Del Arco had a recurring role on TNT cable network's The Closer as the openly gay medical examiner, Dr. Morales. He continued the role as a series regular in the series' spin-off, Major Crimes.

In 2014, he appeared in the episode "Love Sucks" of The Crazy Ones, as the previously offscreen husband of Brad Garrett's character. Del Arco also reprised his role of the Borg drone "Hugh" in Star Trek: Picard (2020), a direct sequel to The Next Generation.

== Political activism ==
In addition to acting, Del Arco is a political, environmental, and gay rights activist. Del Arco turned to waiting tables in 1995 for an income. Instead, through a friend, he found paid work on an environmental campaign being led by actor/director Rob Reiner. Del Arco then worked on numerous political campaigns. Del Arco credits the political activism with allowing him to find a new passion and expansiveness as an actor, which led to new acting roles.

Del Arco volunteered for Barack Obama and has worked for five presidential campaigns, including as a celebrity surrogate for President Obama in 2012, Hillary Clinton in 2016, and the Biden/Harris campaign in 2020. Most recently, he has volunteered as surrogate for Jon Ossoff and Raphael Warnock for their campaigns in the 2020 Georgia Senate runoff elections.

He works to raise awareness for the Gay, Lesbian and Straight Education Network (GLSEN), which Del Arco described as life-changing. "Never did I imagine that working for a nonprofit organization would have such a great effect on me personally. It's changed the structure of how I use my career as an actor because now I have a reason beyond entertainment to promote something other than me."

In 2013, Del Arco was awarded the 2013 Visibility Award from the Human Rights Campaign and now works with the campaign as a guest speaker.

Del Arco is a member of Actors' Equity Association.

== Personal life ==
Del Arco was born in Uruguay. When he was 10 years old his family left their home for the United States, moving into a two-bedroom, "rat-infested" apartment in Port Chester, New York.

When Del Arco was age 24 and living in New York City, he lost his first partner, Eddie, to AIDS. Later, when preparing the role of Hugh for Star Trek, Del Arco based the character's "innocence" and "wonder" upon Eddie, and channelled his own grief into the part: "I had just lost my partner a year before, so I was broken and lost and lonely, and I was willing to share that."

Del Arco subsequently met Kyle Fritz, a talent manager, a year and a half after moving to Hollywood. They began a relationship around the time Del Arco appeared in the Star Trek: The Next Generation episode "I, Borg", and later married.

One of Del Arco's best friends is Jeri Ryan, who like Del Arco played a Borg character in the Star Trek franchise; when Ryan returned to her role in 2020, Del Arco rehearsed with her to help her prepare.

== Filmography ==
=== Television and video games ===
Year	Title	Role	Notes
1987	Miami Vice	Ricky Díaz	episode: "God's Work"
1991	Sisters	Teenage David	episode: "A Kiss Is Still a Kiss"
1991	True Colors	Joey Santos	episode: "Strange Bedfellows"
1992–93	Star Trek: The Next Generation	Hugh / Third of Five	2 episodes
1993	The Wonder Years	Ted	2 episodes
1994	Blossom	Raymond Salazar	episode: "Last Tango"
1996	Pacific Blue	Jimmy Porter	episode: "Déjà vu"
1996	Pearl	Carlo Morra	2 episodes
1997	Boy Meets World	Nunzio	episode: "Last Tango in Philly"
2000	Grosse Pointe	Greg	episode: "Star Wars"
2001	Star Trek: Armada II	Various characters (uncredited)	video game
2001	Star Trek: Voyager	Fantôme	episode: "The Void"
2002	First Monday	Angel Flores	episode: "First Monday" (pilot)
2002	Star Trek: Bridge Commander	Lt. Comm. Miguel Pedro Díaz	video game
2003	The Division	Uncredited cameo	episode: "Misdirection"
2003	Nip/Tuck	Sofia López	3 episodes
2004	Crossing Jordan	Dr. Alex Cuevas	episode: "Necessary Risks"
2004	The D.A.	Dr. Carlo Martínez	2 episodes
2005	24	Ian	episode: "Day 4: 5:00 a.m. – 6:00 a.m."
2005	American Dreams	Father Alejandro	2 episodes
2005	Huff	Dr. Ruiz	episode: "Crazy Nuts & All Fucked Up"
2006	The Sopranos	Father José	episode: "The Ride"
2007–2012	The Closer	Dr. Fernando Morales	39 episodes
2009	Dollhouse	Mr. Caviezel	episode: "Meet Jane Doe"
2012	This American Housewife	Ron	unaired pilot
2014	The Crazy Ones	Timothy	episode: "Love Sucks"
2016	NCIS	Ned Senders	episode: "Shell Game"
2012–2018	Major Crimes	Dr. Fernando Morales	69 episodes
2020	Star Trek: Picard	Hugh	3 episodes
2022	Chicago Med	Albert Marrero	Season 8 Episode 2: "(Caught Between) The Wrecking Ball and the Butterfly"
2022	From Scratch	David	
2023	Criminal Minds: Evolution	Silvio Herrera	Episode: "True Conviction"

=== Film ===
Year	Title	Role	Notes
1989	Lost Angels	Angel	
1991	The Mambo Kings	Young Cesar	
2000	True Rights	Sequoia	TV film
2009	Group	Jeremy Solaris	TV film
2014	Sacrifice	Sebastian	short film
