= Starstruck (1998 film) =

1998 film by John Enbom

- Theatrical poster
- Directed by: John Enbom
- Written by: John Enbom
- Produced by: Beau Flynn; Jonathan King; Stefan Simchowitz
- Starring: Jamie Kennedy; Loren Dean; Bridgette Wilson; Carmen Electra; Amy Smart
- Edited by: J. Kathleen Gibson
- Music by: Christophe Beck
- Production companies: Persistent Entertainment; Bandeira Entertainment; In D 500
- Release date: 18 April 1998 (LA Film Festival)
- Running time: 90 minutes
- Country: United States
- Language: English

Starstruck is a 1998 American comedy drama film written and directed by John Embom and starring Jamie Kennedy and Loren Dean.

== Premise ==
A temp/aspiring screenwriter in Los Angeles befriends a washed up, former teen idol and develops an unhealthy relationship with him.

== Cast ==
- Jamie Kennedy as George Gordon Flynn
- Loren Dean as Kyle Carey
- Bridgette Wilson as Sandra
- Spencer Garrett as Philip
- Bruce Ramsay as Manny
- Carmen Electra as Iona Shirley
- Amy Smart as Tracey Beck
- Clarence Williams III as Jarry Wallace
- Marlo Thomas as Linda Phaeffle
- Paul Herman as Saul Spengler

== Reception ==
From Nathan Rabin at The A.V. Club:

Starstruck, filmed under the significantly less Blockbuster-friendly title Starfucker, serves as a sadly typical example of the genre, taking on such familiar targets as greedy agents, starlet bimbos, and drug-addled actors with all the freshness of an episode of Three's Company... Perhaps part of the reason films like Starstruck keep getting made is because they flatter their audience, enabling anyone who has picked up a copy of Movieline within the past few years or caught an episode of Action to feel like a bona fide Hollywood insider. But even if Starstruck weren't dealing in such fruitless, tired subject matter, it wouldn't work. Its leads are smug, obnoxious, slap-worthy cretins, and with the possible exception of a wry Clarence Williams III as Kennedy's incompetent lawyer, no one seems to have any idea what to do with the material.
