= Clarence Williams III =

American actor (1939–2021)

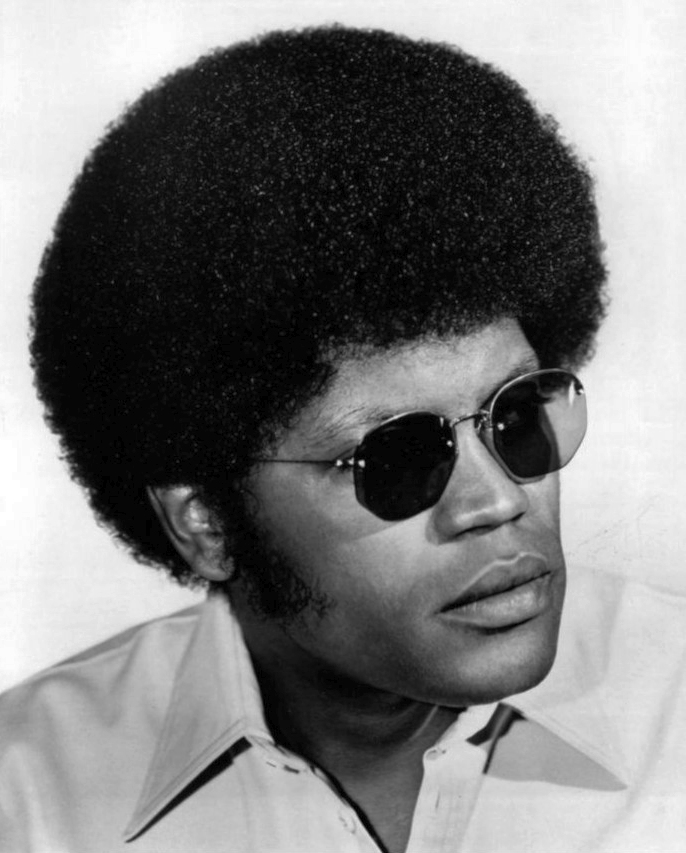
- Williams in The Mod Squad (1971)
- Born: August 21, 1939; New York City, U.S.
- Died: June 4, 2021 (aged 81); Los Angeles, California, U.S.
- Resting place: St Charles Cemetery, East Farmingdale, New York, U.S.
- Occupation: Actor
- Years active: 1959–2018
- Spouse: Gloria Foster (m. 1967; div. 1984)
- Relatives: Clarence Williams (grandfather); Eva Taylor (grandmother)

Clarence Williams III (August 21, 1939 – June 4, 2021) was an American actor. He was best known for his starring role as Linc Hayes on the television series The Mod Squad (1968–73). He also appeared in films such as Purple Rain, 52 Pick-Up, Tales from the Hood, Hoodlum, Deep Cover, Half Baked, Life, American Gangster, and Reindeer Games, and was a Tony Award-nominated stage actor.

== Early life ==
Born in New York City, Williams was the son of a professional musician, Clarence "Clay" Williams Jr., and grandson of jazz and blues composer/pianist Clarence Williams and his singer-actress wife, Eva Taylor. Raised by his paternal grandmother, he became interested in acting after accidentally walking onto a stage at a theater below a Harlem YMCA.

During the late 1950s, Williams served two years in the United States Army, as a paratrooper in C Company, 506th Infantry, of the 101st Airborne Division.

== Career ==
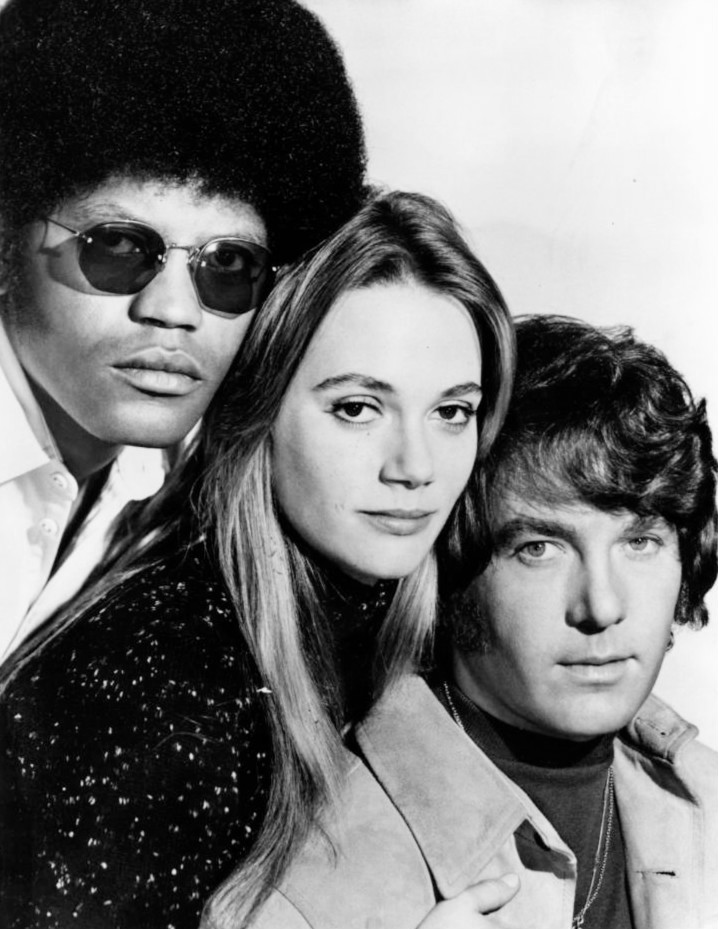
The Mod Squad main cast in 1971 from left: Williams, Peggy Lipton and Michael Cole

Williams first appeared on Broadway in The Long Dream (1960). Continuing his work on stage, he appeared in Walk in Darkness (1963), Sarah and the Sax (1964), Doubletalk (1964), and King John. His breakout theatrical role was in William Hanley's Slow Dance on the Killing Ground, for which he received a Tony Award nomination. The New York Times drama critic Howard Taubman wrote of his performance, "Mr. Williams glides like a dancer, giving his long, fraudulently airy speeches the inner rhythms of fear and showing the nakedness of terror when he ceases to pretend." He also served as artist-in-residence at Brandeis University in 1966.

Williams' breakout television role was as undercover cop Linc Hayes on the popular ABC counterculture police television series The Mod Squad (1968), along with fellow relative unknowns Michael Cole and Peggy Lipton. After the series ended in 1973, he worked in a variety of genres on stage and screen, from comedy (I'm Gonna Git You Sucka, Half-Baked) to sci-fi (Star Trek: Deep Space Nine), and drama (Purple Rain).

Spanning over forty years, his career included the role of Prince's tormented father, who was also a musician, in Purple Rain (1984), A guest appearance in Miami Vice (1985), a recurring role in the surreal TV series Twin Peaks (1990), a good cop in Deep Cover (1992), a rioter in the mini-series Against the Wall (1994), and Wesley Snipes' chemically dependent father in Sugar Hill (1993). His other roles on television include Hill Street Blues, the Canadian cult classic The Littlest Hobo, Miami Vice, The Highwayman, Burn Notice, Everybody Hates Chris, Justified, Cold Case, and Law & Order. He can be seen in films such as 52 Pick-Up, Life, The Cool World, Deep Cover, Tales from the Hood, Half-Baked, King: A Filmed Record... Montgomery to Memphis, Hoodlum, Frogs for Snakes, Starstruck, The General's Daughter, Reindeer Games, Impostor, and as the early jazz musician Jelly Roll Morton in The Legend of 1900. He also played a supporting role as George Wallace's fictional African-American butler and caretaker in the 1997 TNT film George Wallace.

From 2003 to 2007, Williams had a recurring role as Philby Cross in the Mystery Woman film series on the Hallmark Channel. He appeared in all but the first of the eleven films alongside Kellie Martin (J.E. Freeman played Philby in the Mystery Woman first film). In the seventh (Mystery Woman: At First Sight) film, he reunited with his Mod Squad co-star Michael Cole. He played Bumpy Johnson in the film American Gangster. From 2005 to 2007, Williams had another recurring role as the voice of Councilor Andam on the Disney animated series American Dragon: Jake Long.

== Personal life ==
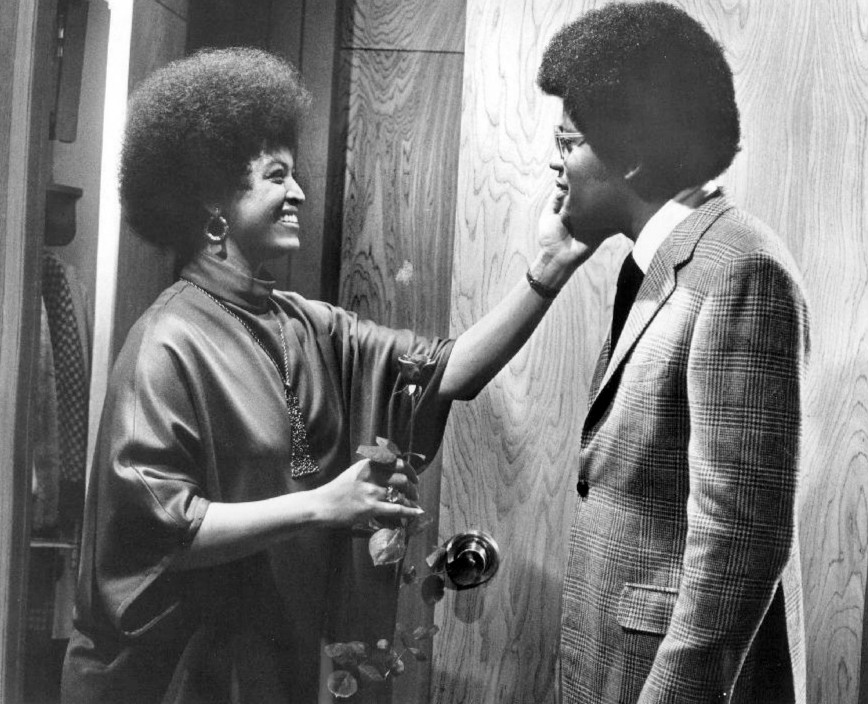
Foster and Williams in The Mod Squad episode in 1970. Foster guest-starred as a blind friend of Linc Hayes.

Williams married the actress Gloria Foster in 1967. They worked together on The Mod Squad; Foster made two guest appearances. The two also acted in a 1964 film The Cool World. In 1984, they filed for divorce, but remained friends. They had no children. Williams announced Foster's death in 2001.

His oft-collaborator, director John Frankenheimer, considered Williams one of the greatest character actors of his lifetime, saying “Clarence’ll put the fear of God in you.”

=== Death ===
Williams died in Los Angeles, on June 4, 2021, at the age of 81, from colon cancer. He is buried in St Charles Cemetery in East Farmingdale, New York.

== Selected filmography ==
=== Film ===
| Year | Title | Role | Notes | Ref. |
|---|---|---|---|---|
| 1959 | Porkchop Hill | Message Runner | Uncredited | |
| 1963 | The Cool World | Blood | | |
| 1984 | Purple Rain | Father | | |
| 1986 | 52 Pick-Up | Bobby Shy | | |
| 1988 | I'm Gonna Git You Sucka | Kalinga | | |
| 1991 | My Heroes Have Always Been Cowboys | Virgil | | |
| 1992 | Deep Cover | Detective Taft | | |
| 1994 | Sugar Hill | Arthur Romello "A.R." Skuggs | | |
| 1995 | Tales from the Hood | Mr. Simms | | |
| 1996 | The Silencers | General Greenboro | | |
| 1997 | Hoodlum | "Bub" Hewlett | | |
| 1998 | The Legend of 1900 | Jelly Roll Morton | | |
| 1998 | Half Baked | Samson Simpson | | |
| 1998 | Starstruck | Jarry Wallace | | |
| 1999 | Life | Winston Hancock | | |
| 1999 | The General's Daughter | Colonel George Fowler | | |
| 2000 | Reindeer Games | "Merlin" | | |
| 2001 | Blue Hill Avenue | Benny | | |
| 2003 | The Extreme Team | Zachary | | |
| 2005 | Constellation | Forest Boxer | | |
| 2007 | The Blue Hour | Ridley | | |
| 2007 | American Gangster | Ellsworth "Bumpy" Johnson | Uncredited | |
| 2009 | The Way of War | Mac | | |
| 2009 | A Day in the Life | Sam | | |
| 2013 | The Butler | Maynard | | |
| 2018 | American Nightmares | Roscoe | | |

=== Television ===
| Year | Title | Role | Notes | Ref. |
|---|---|---|---|---|
| 1968–73 | The Mod Squad | Lincoln "Linc" Hayes | Main cast | |
| 1979 | The Littlest Hobo | David | Episode: "Boy on Wheels" | |
| 1983 | Hill Street Blues | Lester Minley | Episode: "Parting Is Such Sweet Sorrow" | |
| 1984 | T J Hooker | Martin | Episode: "Deadlock" | |
| 1985 | Miami Vice | Maximilian "Legba" Ildefonse | Episode: "Tale of the Goat" | |
| 1985 | The Cosby Show | Mr. Thornhill | Episode: "Cliff's Birthday" | |
| 1990 | Twin Peaks | FBI Agent Roger Hardy | 3 episodes | |
| 1992 | Tales from the Crypt | Grady | Episode: "Maniac at Large" Season 4, Episode 10 | |
| 1994 | Against the Wall | Chaka | Television film | |
| 1996 | Star Trek: Deep Space Nine | Omet'iklan | Episode: "To the Death" | |
| 2000 | Law & Order | Latiff Miller | Episode: "Burn, Baby, Burn" | |
| 2001 | The Legend of Tarzan | Kobe (voice) | Episode: "Tarzan and the Fountain" | |
| 2003 | Fastlane | Mr. Hayes | Episodes: "Overkill", "Dosed" | |
| 2005–07 | American Dragon: Jake Long | Councilor Andam (voice) | Recurring role | |
| 2005 | Everybody Hates Chris | Tate | Episode: "Everybody Hates Basketball" | |
| 2005 | Mystery Woman: Mystery Weekend | Philby | Television film | |
| 2005 | Mystery Woman: Snapshot | Philby | Television film | |
| 2005 | Mystery Woman: Sing Me A Murder | Philby | Television film | |
| 2005 | Mystery Woman: Vision of a Murder | Philby | Television film | |
| 2005 | Mystery Woman: Game Time | Philby | Television film | |
| 2006 | Mystery Woman: At First Sight | Philby | Television film | |
| 2006 | Mystery Woman: Wild West Mystery | Philby | Television film | |
| 2006 | Mystery Woman: Oh Baby | Philby | Television film | |
| 2006 | Mystery Woman: Redemption | Philby | Television film | |
| 2007 | Mystery Woman: In the Shadows | Philby | Television film | |
| 2009 | Burn Notice | Jean Pierre's Father | Episode "Truth and Reconciliation" | |
| 2009 | Cold Case | Henry "Pops" Walters | Episode "Officer Down" | |
| 2010 | Justified | Mr. Jones | Episode: "Long in the Tooth" | |
| 2010 | Memphis Beat | Leroy Hitch | Episode: "I Shall Not Be Moved" | |
| 2015 | Empire | Huey Jarvis | Episode: "True Love Never" | |
