= Mumford (film) =

- Directed by: Lawrence Kasdan
- Written by: Lawrence Kasdan
- Produced by: Lawrence Kasdan; Charles Okun
- Starring: Hope Davis; Loren Dean; Jason Lee; Mary McDonnell; David Paymer; Martin Short; Pruitt Taylor Vince; Alfre Woodard
- Cinematography: Ericson Core
- Edited by: Carol Littleton; William Steinkamp
- Music by: James Newton Howard
- Production company: Touchstone Pictures
- Distributed by: Buena Vista Pictures Distribution
- Release date: September 24, 1999
- Running time: 112 minutes
- Country: United States
- Language: English
- Budget: $28 million
- Box office: $4.6 million

Mumford is a 1999 American comedy-drama film written and directed by Lawrence Kasdan. It is set in a small town where a new psychologist (Loren Dean) gives offbeat advice to the neurotic residents. Both the psychologist and the town are named Mumford, a coincidence that eventually figures in the plot. The film co-stars Hope Davis, Jason Lee, Alfre Woodard, Mary McDonnell, Martin Short, David Paymer, Pruitt Taylor Vince, Ted Danson, and Zooey Deschanel in her film debut.

== Plot ==
As a relative newcomer to an Oregon town that bears his name, Dr. Mumford seems charming and skillful to his neighbors and patients. His unique, frank approach to psychotherapy attracts patients away from the two therapists already working in the area.

Soon he is treating a variety of conditions, ranging from the obsession of one man with erotic novels to an unhappily married woman and her compulsive shopping. Mumford befriends a billionaire computer mogul and a cafe waitress and attempts to play matchmaker. He also begins to fall for a patient who has chronic fatigue syndrome.

Together with an attorney whom Mumford had rejected as a patient because of his narcissism, the rival therapists conspire to find skeletons in Mumford's closet, hoping to destroy his reputation. Meanwhile, Mumford's inherent likability causes his life to become intertwined with much of the rest of the town.

== Cast ==
- Jane Adams as Dr. Phyllis Sheeler
- Ted Danson as Jeremy Brockett
- Hope Davis as Sofie Crisp
- Loren Dean as Dr. Mumford
- Jason Lee as Skip Skipperton
- Mary McDonnell as Althea Brockett
- David Paymer as Dr. Ernest Delbanco
- Martin Short as Lionel Dillard
- Robert Stack as Himself
- Pruitt Taylor Vince as Henry Follett
- Alfre Woodard as Lily Thompson
- Zooey Deschanel as Nessa Watkins
- Dana Ivey as Mrs. Crisp
- Kevin Tighe as Mr. Crisp
- Jason Ritter as Martin Brockett
- Elisabeth Moss as Katie Brockett
- Simon Helberg as College Roommate

The film also includes future Dancing with the Stars contestant and winner Kelly Monaco in a small nonspeaking role.

== Production ==
Filming took place in several California communities, including Sebastopol. Old Main Street Saloon in Sebastopol was used for the scene in which Mumford (Loren Dean) and Skip Skipperton (Jason Lee) have a drink together.

== Reception ==
Mumford was met with mixed reviews. Many critics expressed a general approval, but questioned the unpleasant back story (which contrasted with the overall tone of the film). The film has a 58% rating on Rotten Tomatoes, based on 83 reviews, with an average rating of 5.92/10. The website's critical consensus states: "Memorable moments are few and far between." On Metacritic, the film has a weighted average score of 62 out of 100, based on 33 critics, indicating "generally favorable reviews".

Roger Ebert gave a favorable review: "There are no earth-shaking payoffs here. No dramatic astonishments, vile betrayals or sexual surprises. Just the careful and loving creation of some characters it is mostly a pleasure to meet. And at its deepest level, profoundly down there below the surface, it is something more, I think: an expression of Kasdan's humanist longings, his wish that people would listen better and value one another more. It is the strangest thing, how this movie sneaks up and makes you feel a little better about yourself."

The film, based on a $28 million budget, was a commercial failure, earning only $4,555,459 in the US.
