= Tim McCann (director) =

American film director

- Born: June 21, 1965 (age 60); Spring Valley, New York, United States
- Occupations: Film director, screenwriter, film producer

Tim McCann (born June 21, 1965) is an American film director and a professor of film at his alma mater, the State University of New York at Purchase.

== Biography ==
McCann was born in Spring Valley, New York, and grew up in Nyack, New York. His parents divorced when he was 3. At 15, McCann wanted to make films, and in 1987 graduated from the film school at the State University of New York at Purchase. He then spent four years in Brooklyn, New York City, working odd jobs and directing low-budget commercials. By early 1996, he was an audio-visual specialist at the Chappaqua Library, in Chappaqua, New York.

He directed his first feature, Desolation Angels, in 1995, made on a budget of $42,000. The film, which starred Michael Rodrick, premiered at the 1995 Telluride Film Festival. It then won the International Critics Prize (FIPRESCI Prize) at the Toronto International Film Festival, and was accepted to the Rotterdam Film Festival.

== Filmography ==
- American Exit (2019; co-directed with Ingo Vollkammer)
- No Beast So Fierce (2015)
- All Mistakes Buried (2015)
- White Rabbit (2013)
- The Poker Club (2008)
- Runaway (2005)
- Nowhere Man (2005)
- Deca - Dance (2004; TV)
- Revolution #9 (2001)
- Homicide: Life on the Street - Wu's on First? (1997; TV)
- Desolation Angels (1995)
