= All Mistakes Buried =

- Theatrical release poster
- Directed by: Tim McCann
- Screenplay by: Shaun Sanghani; Tim McCann; Sam Trammell
- Produced by: Shaun Sanghani
- Starring: Sam Trammell; Vanessa Ferlito
- Cinematography: Alan McIntyre Smith
- Edited by: Tim McCann; Chris Kursel
- Music by: John Vincent McCauley
- Production company: SSS Entertainment
- Distributed by: Breaking Glass Pictures
- Release dates: May 31, 2015 (Dances With Films); January 22, 2016 (United States)
- Running time: 84 minutes
- Country: United States
- Language: English

All Mistakes Buried (formerly known as The Aftermath) is a 2015 crime drama film written and directed by Tim McCann, also written by Shaun Sanghani and Sam Trammell. The film stars Sam Trammell and Vanessa Ferlito. It was produced by Shaun Sanghani (SSS Entertainment). It had its world premiere at the Dances With Films Festival and is being distributed in the United States by Breaking Glass Pictures.

== Premise ==
A lone, struggling addict takes on a dangerous underground criminal ring in his small Southern town to retrieve a stolen pendant he believes will save his marriage.

== Cast ==
- Sam Trammell as Sonny
- Vanessa Ferlito as Franki
- Nick Loeb as Nick
- Missy Yager as Jennifer

== Production ==
Principal photography of the film took place in August 2013 in Alexandria, Louisiana, United States. The movie was shot in 12 days.

== Release ==
All Mistakes Buried premiered on May 31, 2015 at the Dances With Films Festival. It was released theatrically and on video on demand in North America on January 22, 2016.

== Reception ==
=== Critical response ===
On the review aggregator website Rotten Tomatoes, 67% of nine critics' reviews are positive, with an average rating of 7.5/10. Metacritic, which uses a weighted average, assigned the film a score of 56 out of 100, based on five critics, indicating "mixed or average" reviews.

=== Accolades ===
Awards
Award	Date of ceremony	Category	Recipients and nominees	Result
Boston Film Festival	September 21, 2015	Best Actor	Sam Trammell	Won
Boston Film Festival	September 21, 2015	Best Supporting Actress	Missy Yager	Won
Boston Film Festival	September 21, 2015	Best Editing	Tim McCann; Chris Kursel	Won
