= Matt McGrath (actor) =

American actor

Matt McGrath (born June 11, 1969) is an American actor who has worked across stage, television, and film.

== Early life ==
McGrath was born in New York City on June 11, 1969, into an Irish Catholic family, with parents who worked in local politics. He first resided in Stuyvesant Town, then in Hell's Kitchen, Manhattan, and then briefly in Albany, New York.

He started performing on Broadway as a child. McGrath performed in Peter Pan and the original musical Working. He can be heard on the Original Cast Recording released in 2001, singing his solo Neat to Be a Newsboy.

He went to Fordham University for a year, until a professor encouraged him to join the Circle Repertory Company.

== Career ==
As an adult, McGrath appeared in A Streetcar Named Desire with Alec Baldwin and Jessica Lange as the Young Collector and later portrayed the Emcee, originated by Joel Grey, in the Roundabout Theatre Company's production of Kander and Ebb's musical Cabaret. Off-Broadway, McGrath played the title character in Jerry Springer: The Opera. He also appeared in The Black Rider (including productions in London, San Francisco, Sydney and Los Angeles), The Legend of Georgia McBride (Lucille Lortel & LAOCC Awards), Hedwig and the Angry Inch, A Fair Country, The Collection, Fat Men in Skirts, The Old Boy, and Amulets Against the Dragon Forces, and Dalton's Back (which received a Drama Desk nomination). In regional theatre, McGrath has appeared in The Rocky Horror Show (as Frank ‘N' Furter), Romance and Distant Fires (LA Weekly Award).

He won the 2016 Lucille Lortel Award for Best Featured Performance, as well as the 2017 Drama Critics Circle Award for his portrayal of Miss Tracy Mills in The Legend of Georgia McBride. In The New York Times review of the play, Charles Isherwood wrote, “There isn’t a trace of caricature in his portrayal of the sweetly maternal Tracy”.

In 2020, he was in the Broadway premiere Girl from the North Country.

McGrath's film appearances include roles in The Chaperone, Boys Don't Cry, The Broken Hearts Club: A Romantic Comedy, The Impostors. Full Grown Men and The Notorious Bettie Page. On television, McGrath has appeared on Modern Family where he plays Simon (Mitchell's nemesis from Law School) and on episodes of Pose, Law & Order: Criminal Intent, Now and Again, New York Undercover and Cruel Doubt; he also had a role on the short-lived My Life and Times.

== Filmography ==
=== Films ===
Film
Year	Title	Role
1987	Ironweed	Goblin
1990	Desperate Hours	Kyle
1990	Pump Up the Volume	Chris
1992	Bob Roberts	Burt
1996	The Substance of Fire	Young Book Clerk
1997	Lifebreath	Todd Rusk
1997	Colin Fitz Lives!	Paul
1997	Boys Life 2	Junior (segment 4; "The Dadshuttle")
1997	1999	Andrew Goldman
1998	The Impostors	Detective Marco
1999	Boys Don't Cry	Lonny
1999	Story of a Bad Boy	Guy
2000	The Broken Hearts Club: A Romantic Comedy	Howie
2001	The Anniversary Party	Jeffrey (uncredited)
2005	The Notorious Bettie Page	Nervous Man
2006	Full Grown Men	Alby Cutrera
2007	The Man who Shot America	The Utah Grim Reaper
2012	Ex-Girlfriends	Professor O'Donnelly
2018	The Chaperone	Raymond

=== TV ===
Television
Year	Title	Role	Notes
1990	Appearances	Troy Danzig	(TV Movie)
1991	My Life and Times	Robert Miller	(TV Series), 3 episodes: "April 9, 2035", "Millennium" and "The Collapse of '98"
1991	ABC Afterschool Specials	C.z.	(TV Series), 1 episode: "It's Only Rock & Roll"
1992	Cruel Doubt	Chris Pritchard	(TV Mini-Series), 2 episodes: "Episode #1.1" and "Episode #1.2"
1994	Winnetka Road	(Unnamed role)	(TV Series), 2 episodes: "Townies" and "The Real Wisconsin"
1995	Chicago Hope	Dr. Scott Callahan	(TV Series), 1 episode: "The Virus"
1996	Andersonville	Ethan	(TV Mini-Series)
1997	The Member of the Wedding	Jarvis	(TV Movie)
1998	New York Undercover	Jonathan	(TV Series), 1 episode: "Sign o' the Times"
1998	Frasier	Protester	(TV Series), 1 episode: "Sweet Dreams"
2000	Now and Again	Dr. Bing	(TV Series), 2 episodes: "The Bugmeister" and "The Bugmeister, Part Bee"
2006	Law & Order: Criminal Intent	Simon Fife	(TV Series), 1 episode: "Masquerade"
2008	Little Britain USA	Various roles	(TV Series), 1 episode: "Episode #1.2"
2015	Modern Family	Simon	(TV Series), 2 episodes: "Closet? You'll Love It!" and "The More You Ignore Me"
2018	Pose	Mitchell	(TV Series), 1 episode: "Access"
2020	The Undoing	Joseph Hoffman	(TV Mini-Series), 2 episodes: "The Undoing" and "The Missing"
