= The Poker Club (film) =

2008 film directed by Tim McCann

- Directed by: Tim McCann
- Starring: Loren Dean; Lori Heuring; Johnny Messner; Judy Reyes; Johnathon Schaech
- Release date: 2008
- Country: United States
- Language: English

The Poker Club is a 2008 American thriller film. It was directed by Tim McCann.

== Premise ==
Four friends accidentally kill a burglar during their weekly poker night.

== Cast ==
- Loren Dean as Curtis Wilcox
- Lori Heuring as Jan Tyler
- Johnny Messner as Bill Doyle
- Judy Reyes as Detective Patterson
- Johnathon Schaech as Aaron Tyler
- Jana Kramer as Trudy Todaro
