= Loren Dean =

American actor (born 1969)

- Born: Loren Dean Jovicic; July 31, 1969 (age 57); Las Vegas, Nevada, U.S.
- Occupation: Actor
- Years active: 1988–present
- Spouse: James Jovicic (m. 2008)

Loren Dean (born July 31, 1969) is an American actor who has appeared on stage and in feature films, including as the title character in Billy Bathgate, as well as Apollo 13, Rosewood, Space Cowboys, and Ad Astra. He appeared in a recurring role on the television series Bones.

== Early life ==
Loren Dean Jovicic was born July 31, 1969, in Las Vegas, Nevada to Elayne (née Rosoff), and Borislav Jovicic. His parents divorced when he was a small child. His mother won custody of Loren, and the family moved to Los Angeles, California. When visiting his father, the two often went to the movies—which Dean says led to his love of film. His childhood was a difficult one, and he ran away from home when he was 16 years old. He graduated from Santa Monica High School in Santa Monica, California, in 1986.

Dean moved to New York City to pursue an acting career. After two years, a friend introduced him to an agent, and he began appearing in stage plays in New York. He won a Theatre World Award in 1989 for his Off Broadway debut in the play Amulets Against the Dragon Forces at the Circle Repertory Company. He is a playwright and one of Academy Award-winning screenwriter John Patrick Shanley's favorite actors, having appeared in many of the author's plays, notably 4 Dogs and a Bone and Beggars in the House of Plenty.

Dean became an animal lover during his time in New York.

== Career ==
Dean's first film was 1988's Plain Clothes. He made his big break a year later, cast as a bad ex-boyfriend in Say Anything... starring John Cusack. His third film, the 1991 crime drama Billy Bathgate, cast him in a leading role alongside Nicole Kidman, Dustin Hoffman and Bruce Willis.

Dean was lauded for his role as a cocaine-addicted, has-been movie star who is accidentally re-launched on the road to fame and fortune by a fan in Starstruck. Variety noted that Dean "nails his role with precision". He was lauded for his performance as a mysterious small-town psychologist in Mumford (1999).

Much of his acting career has been in supporting roles. His films include Apollo 13 (1995), How to Make an American Quilt (1995), Gattaca (1997), Enemy of the State (1998), and Space Cowboys (2000). Dean has appeared in independent films including The War Bride and The Poker Club, and several well-received television miniseries including The Bronx Is Burning). He played Russ, the brother of Temperance "Bones" Brennan on the TV series Bones. He had a recurring role on the 2010 crime drama Terriers. In 2011, Dean starred in the made-for-television movie Who Is Simon Miller? The film, which aired on NBC, was financed by Procter & Gamble and Walmart as one of their quarterly "Family Movie Night" films. Each film is designed to present wholesome values with almost no violence, sex, or drug use.

Dean has supported filmmakers behind the scenes as well. In 1999, he was a juror for the third annual Shorts International Film Festival.

== Filmography ==
Year	Title	Role	Notes
1988	Plain Clothes	Matt Dunbar	
1989	Say Anything...	Joe	
1989	As the World Turns	Buddy	7 episodes
1991	Billy Bathgate	Billy 'Bathgate' Behan	
1992	1492: Conquest of Paradise	Older Ferdinand Columbus	
1993	JFK: Reckless Youth	Joe Kennedy Jr.	Miniseries; 2 episodes
1993	The American Clock	Young Lee Baumler	TV Movie
1995	The Passion of Darkly Noon	Jude	
1995	Apollo 13	John Aaron - EECOM Arthur	
1995	How to Make an American Quilt	Preston	
1996	Mrs. Winterbourne	Steve DeCunzo	
1997	Rosewood	James Taylor	
1997	The End of Violence	Dean 'Doc' Brock	
1997	Gattaca	Anton Freeman	
1998	Starstruck	Kyle Carey	
1998	Enemy of the State	NSA Agent Loren Hicks	
1999	Mumford	Dr. Mumford	
2000	Space Cowboys	Ethan Glance	
2001	The War Bride	Joe	
2004	Special Victims Unit	Roger Baker	Season 6 Episode 2: "Debt"
2005	Numb3rs	Paul Stevens	Season 2 Episode 11: "Scorched"
2006–2008	Bones	Russ Brennan	5 episodes
2007	Without a Trace	Judge Chris Manning	Season 5 Episode 22: "One and Only"
2007	The Bronx Is Burning	Fran Healy	Miniseries; 8 episodes
2008	The Poker Club	Curtis Wilcox	
2008	CSI: Crime Scene Investigation	Peter Rowe	Season 9 Episode 7: "Woulda, Coulda, Shoulda"
2008	Reservations	Marc	
2009	Middletown	Adam Tanner	Short
2010	Conviction	Rick Miller	
2010	Terriers	Jason Adler	6 episodes
2011	Who Is Simon Miller?	Simon Miller	TV Movie
2018	Grey's Anatomy	David	Season 14 Episode 22: "Fight for Your Mind"
2018	The Mule	Agent Brown	
2019	Ad Astra	Donald Stanford	
