= Michael Rodrick =

American actor (born 1977)

- Born: February 22, 1977 (age 49); Jersey City, New Jersey, U.S.
- Education: The Catholic University of America
- Occupation: Actor
- Website: michaelrodrick.com

Michael J. Rodrick (born February 22, 1977) is an American actor.

== Biography ==
Rodrick was born and raised in Jersey City, New Jersey. During his junior year of high school, he auditioned for New Jersey's Governor's School of the Arts on a lark to get himself out of the house. He was one of twelve students selected across the state. He went on to receive a full scholarship to the Catholic University of America, graduating with a BA in political science. During school, he supported himself as a theater carpenter – often building the sets on which he would later perform. Early in his college career, he portrayed Jim O'Connor in Tennessee Williams' The Glass Menagerie and The Beast in Beauty and the Beast.

Rodrick can be seen starring as Briggs on Castle Rock and as Ray Fisher on Greenleaf. He has appeared in several feature films, most notably The River Murders opposite Ray Liotta, Nowhere Man, Desolation Angels (Telluride Film Festival winner), and Under Hellgate Bridge. He has repeatedly collaborated with director Tim McCann. Rodrick originated the role of Cameron Sinclair on NBC's Another World also General Hospital and has appeared in guest star roles on Hawaii Five-0, Castle, Major Crimes, Rizzoli & Isles, Saving Grace, The Mentalist, 24, Bones, Charmed, and the Jerry Bruckheimer shows CSI: Miami, Without a Trace, Close to Home, and Cold Case. He has also lent his voice to the video games Call of Duty: Black Ops II and L.A. Noire.
