= List of The Closer characters =

This is a list of characters from the television series The Closer, which ran from 2005 to 2012 on TNT in the United States. The series centers on the officers of the LAPD's Priority Murder Squad (season 1), renamed Priority Homicide Division (seasons 1–4), then renamed the Major Crimes Division (seasons 4–7). Many of these characters reappeared in the spin-off series Major Crimes.

== Overview ==
= Main cast (credited)
= Recurring cast

Main characters
Actor	Character	Seasons						
Actor	Character	1	2	3	4	5	6	7
Kyra Sedgwick	Brenda Leigh Johnson	Main	Main	Main	Main	Main	Main	Main
J. K. Simmons	Will Pope	Main	Main	Main	Main	Main	Main	Main
Robert Gossett	Russell Taylor	Main	Main	Main	Main	Main	Main	Main
Corey Reynolds	David Gabriel	Main	Main	Main	Main	Main	Main	Main
G. W. Bailey	Louie Provenza	Main	Main	Main	Main	Main	Main	Main
Tony Denison	Andy Flynn	Main	Main	Main	Main	Main	Main	Main
Jon Tenney	Fritz Howard	Main	Main	Main	Main	Main	Main	Main
Michael Paul Chan	Michael Tao	Recurring	Recurring	Main	Main	Main	Main	Main
Raymond Cruz	Julio Sanchez	Recurring	Recurring	Main	Main	Main	Main	Main
Gina Ravera	Irene Daniels	Recurring	Recurring	Main	Main			
Phillip P. Keene	Buzz Watson	Recurring	Recurring	Recurring	Main	Main	Main	Main
Mary McDonnell	Sharon Raydor					Recurring	Recurring	Main

== Main characters ==
- Kyra Sedgwick as Brenda Leigh Johnson, Los Angeles Police Department (LAPD) deputy chief, Major Crimes Division. Originally a CIA-trained interrogator and police detective from Atlanta, Georgia, she is the interrogation specialist Will Pope calls a "closer.”
- J. K. Simmons as Will Pope, LAPD assistant chief for operations, acting chief of police during season six and interim chief of police during season seven. His office is sometimes sarcastically referred to as "The Vatican.” He and Johnson previously had an affair while he was married.
- Corey Reynolds as David Gabriel, LAPD sergeant, is a laterally appointed detective sergeant from season one onward. He has a master's degree in public administration from the University of Southern California.
- Robert Gossett as Russell Taylor, LAPD captain, is initially assigned to Robbery-Homicide Division, promoted to commander in season 2, and appointed LAPD interdepartmental liaison in season 4.
- G. W. Bailey as Louie Provenza, LAPD detective lieutenant, is second-in-command of MCD, and has a curmudgeonly personality, as well as being unmotivated to do work.
- Tony Denison as Andy Flynn, LAPD detective lieutenant, is transferred from Robbery-Homicide to MCD during season 1.
- Jon Tenney as Fritz Howard, Senior Special Agent of the Federal Bureau of Investigation, is the FBI–LAPD liaison from season 6 onward. He and Johnson were in a relationship prior to the beginning of the series.
- Michael Paul Chan as Michael Tao, LAPD detective lieutenant, is the scientific investigation specialist (main, seasons 3–7; recurring, seasons 1–2)
- Raymond Cruz as Julio Sanchez, LAPD detective, is the guns and gangs specialist (main, seasons 3–7; recurring, seasons 1–2)
- Gina Ravera as Irene Daniels, LAPD detective, is the forensic accounting specialist (main, seasons 3–4; recurring, seasons 1–2)
- Phillip P. Keene as Buzz Watson, LAPD civilian surveillance coordinator, handles video and audio tasks. (Main, seasons 4–7; recurring, seasons 1–3)
- Mary McDonnell as Sharon Raydor, LAPD captain, Force Investigation Division, is also Women's Coordinator for the LAPD (main, season 7; recurring, seasons 5–6)

== Recurring characters ==
=== Los Angeles Police Department ===
- Captain Sharon Raydor (Mary McDonnell): An internal-affairs officer who is introduced during season 5, initially to investigate a shooting in which Sgt. Gabriel is accused of misconduct; later she takes on the case of the controversial death of a material witness who had been in Brenda's custody. Often described as a stickler for the rules, Sharon's constant scrutiny of Major Crimes earns her the distrust of Brenda and her squad. Over time, Brenda and Sharon develop a grudging mutual respect which becomes an awkward alliance. Later, Sharon encourages Brenda to apply for chief of police. In the sequel/continuance series, Major Crimes, Sharon takes over Brenda's former squad, and, despite initial friction over her appointment, gradually earns their trust. She takes in a material witness in the Philip Stroh case, Rusty Beck, first as a foster child, then eventually as her adopted son, and in later seasons of the show falls in love with Lt. Andy Flynn and marries him. She dies of a heart attack during the last season.
- Deputy Chief (later Chief) Thomas "Tommy" Delk (Courtney B. Vance): Initially an LAPD Deputy Chief in charge of handling matters relating to terrorism, he is Brenda's main rival for the position of Chief of Police. Upon selection for the position, Delk offers Brenda Pope's job as Assistant Chief of Operations, which she declines—supporting Pope's fight to stay in the position. Delk's unexpected death puts departmental changes on hold.
- Detective Ross (Conan McCarty): A Robbery-Homicide detective whose loyalties are with Commander Taylor.

=== Family ===
- Willie Rae Johnson (Frances Sternhagen): Brenda’s mother, who is introduced during season 2. Willie Rae was the buffer between Brenda and her father, and her enthusiasm for Brenda's work at times embarrassed her daughter. Despite this, she and Brenda had a close, loving relationship. She dies near the end of Season 7 after asking to tell Brenda something that she dies before she can express. Brenda is left devastated by her death and the fact that she brushed her mother off and so would never know what she had wanted to say.
- Clay Johnson (Barry Corbin): Brenda's father, who is introduced during season 3. Clay suffers from a heart condition. He is often hurt by Brenda's neglect of the family, but loves her unconditionally, as she does him.
- Charleen "Charlie" Johnson (Sosie Ruth Bacon): Brenda's problematic 16-year-old niece, brought to LA by Willie Rae, who hopes Brenda and Fritz will help straighten her out. During her stay, Charlie's use of marijuana causes friction between Fritz, who is a recovering alcoholic, and Charlie and Brenda. Charlie also becomes emotionally involved with one of Brenda's cases when she befriends a teenage shooting victim and is used by Brenda to gather information. The boy ultimately dies of his injuries, devastating Charlie, but not before he gives Brenda information that leads to his killer.
- Claire Howard (Amy Sedaris): Fritz' colorful sister, and now Brenda's sister-in-law. A self-described intuitionist, and an adherent to a number of alternative practices, she "assisted" the MCD with one of their cases.

=== Los Angeles County Coroner's Office ===
- Dr. Crippen (James Avery): The original medical examiner who Brenda and her team most commonly dealt with (seasons 1 to early 3). He was initially annoyed by Brenda’s attitude, much like the rest of the police department. He sustains a serious foot injury and is replaced by Dr. Morales.
- Dr. Fernando Morales (Jonathan Del Arco): A Deputy Medical Examiner for the Los Angeles County Coroner's Office, who took over (season 3) following Dr. Crippen's injury. Though sarcastic and rude in demeanor, with an occasionally morbid sense of humor, he is passionate about his work. Morales is openly gay, and at times will serve as a resource regarding the gay community. He occasionally jokingly flirts with Sergeant Gabriel. While Morales' full name is not known during the Closer and the first three seasons of Major Crimes, it's mentioned in Rusty Beck's video blog (posted to YouTube) in which he is interviewed. In the Major Crimes episode "Dead Drop", Morales' father visits from Uruguay and it is revealed that Morales is from a family of police officers, is the only one to take a different path and has lied about his role in the investigations for years to make his father proud. Privately, Morales' father confides that he knows the truth and is proud of his son regardless.
- Terrence Hynes (Robert Clendenin): A socially inept LA County Coroner's Forensics Support Technician with an odd sense of humor. Hynes is responsible for preparing a body to be brought to the Coroner's office for autopsy, and for assisting the Medical Examiner. He is pursuing medical studies during early seasons, and last appears as "Dr. Terrence" (his preferred moniker), a medical examiner for the Los Angeles County Coroner's Office, in season 5.
- Coroner's Investigator Kendall (Ransford Doherty): A field operative who is responsible for examining the body at a crime scene, and transporting it to the LA County Coroner's office. In the Major Crimes episode "Intersection", Kendall is personally affected by a car-on-bicycle homicide because he recently lost a cousin in the same manner.

=== Los Angeles County District Attorney's Office ===
- Deputy DA Martin Garnett (James Patrick Stuart): A Deputy District Attorney for Los Angeles County, charged with making decisions about whether Brenda's cases will go to court. He and Brenda have an often-difficult working relationship.
- Deputy DA Andrea Hobbs (Kathe Mazur): A Deputy District Attorney for Los Angeles County, charged with making decisions about whether Brenda's cases will go to court. Like Garnett, she can bump heads with Brenda at times, but tends to have a better working relationship with her. Hobbs acts as the primary DDA in Major Crimes where she has a good working relationship with Sharon Raydor. After deciding to go to law school, Rusty Beck becomes her intern and later assistant in second half of season 5 and in season 6.
- Deputy DA Emma Rios (Nadine Velazquez): A Deputy District Attorney for Los Angeles County appearing in Major Crimes who is in charge of prosecuting the Phillip Stroh case despite her inexperience. Rios acts as the primary DDA throughout season 2, though her attitude, particularly towards Rusty Beck, often puts her at odds with the detectives. In season 3, she is once again replaced by Andrea Hobbs, not reappearing until the final two episodes of the season when Stroh predicts a series of rapes and murders before escaping. Rios is not seen again until season 6 where she attends Sharon Raydor's funeral and is under protection because of the possibility of Stroh's return to the United States. Despite her protection, Rios is killed by Stroh who drowns Rios at the bottom of her own pool, making it look like an accident. However, the police don't buy it as Rios was an avid swimmer and Stroh has been connected to a series of deaths also staged as accidents. Rios' murder is later discovered to have been to draw the detectives' attention to a forged medical file that Rios had found claiming that Stroh was dying.

=== Others ===
- Tom Blanchard (Ray Wise): Brenda and Pope’s lawyer on separate occasions. He is an adept, high-profile lawyer, aware of his own power and willing to use it. He is the keeper of a gift Will once gave to Brenda, although he has not revealed the exact nature of this gift.
- Gavin Q. Baker (Mark Pellegrino) Brenda's flamboyant attorney in the Turrell Baylor and subsequent federal lawsuits. A former City Attorney for Los Angeles, Gavin is astute, clever, and brutally honest.
- Peter Goldman (Curtis Armstrong): Lawyer representing the Turrell Baylor family, who subsequently is on a mission to destroy Brenda's reputation. Subsequently appears in the five part episode Hindsight of the spinoff series Major Crimes.
- Ricardo Ramos (Stephen Martines): Reporter from the Los Angeles Times, who occasionally observes or assists with LAPD cases. Ramos wrote articles suggesting preference for wealthy white victims in the choice of cases pursued by the Priority Homicide Division, leading to the unit being renamed the Major Crimes Division (MCD) during season 4.
- Bill Croelick (Jason O'Mara): A sociopathic murder suspect with an obsession with fire, who first appears in season 1 when he is exonerated for murder. Prior to that, he had been on trial for a similar murder, but was found not guilty. He reappears in season 4 and assists Brenda with a case, after which he promises to leave her jurisdiction and never return.
- Phillip Stroh (Billy Burke): A criminal defense lawyer who specializes in defending accused sex offenders, he first appears as the attorney for a suspected rapist, and demands access to all of the LAPD's evidence against his client in exchange for the name of the man's partner. As it turns out, Stroh himself was the partner, and used this tactic to ascertain that there was no evidence connecting him to the crime. Brenda becomes obsessed with proving Stroh's guilt, and he is finally arrested in the series finale after he breaks into her home and attempts to murder her and a witness to one of his crimes, Rusty Beck (Graham Patrick Martin). Reappears in the spinoff Major Crimes where he attempts to have Rusty killed by Wade Weller, one of Stroh's former clients and a fellow serial killer. Failing at that, Stroh pretends to cooperate with authorities in exchange for a life sentence, murders a judge (who was a classmate and friend) and escapes, fleeing the country. He eventually returns and begins murdering again after his stepbrother inadvertently cuts off the bank account Stroh's mother set up for him overseas with millions of dollars in it. In the show's final episodes "By Any Means" parts one through four, the Major Crimes detectives work to take Stroh down once and for all. At the end of Major Crimes, Stroh is shot dead by Rusty Beck though Lieutenant Provenza takes credit to protect Rusty. During the investigation into Stroh at the end of Major Crimes, his rape and murder spree is revealed to go back to age sixteen, though his earliest known crime was in the sixth grade when he burned a teacher with sulfuric acid. Many of Stroh's earliest crimes had been covered up by his mother through bribes, allowing Stroh to avoid detection and justice.
