= Amulets Against the Dragon Forces =

1989 Off-Broadway play

Amulets Against the Dragon Forces is a play by Paul Zindel. The play focuses on Chris Boyd, a teenager whose mother cares for the dying. It is set in 1950s Staten Island.

The play marked the first new play by Zindel since 1977's Ladies at the Alamo. It was produced Off-Broadway by the Circle Repertory Company, opening on April 6, 1989 and closing on May 7, 1989. Directed by B. Rodney Marriott, the cast included Matt McGrath (Chris), Loren Dean (Harold), John Spencer (Floyd), Deborah Hedwall (Mrs. Boyd), and Ruby Holbrook (Mrs. DiPardi). "I think that 'Amulets Against the Dragon Forces' is my last play that comes from Staten Island," Zindel told the New York Times. "I want to write very big plays. I hear big voices that want to play in Greek spaces. The next time you meet my people, they may be the Kennedys, they may be kings, they may be in the future, they may come down grand stairways."

== Critical reception ==
"It's easy to mock Mr. Zindel's unshapely hothouse drama, whose occupants are variously afflicted by cancer, dipsomania, kleptomania, bisexual nymphomania and poetic excess," noted Frank Rich in the New York Times. "Then we see the child at center stage trying to ward off the horrors, the child too genuine to dismiss as fiction, and Amulets becomes gripping and disturbing despite its Gothic overkill."

"Paul Zindel's Amulets Against the Dragon Forces is not up to the author's best previous dramatic work or down to his worst, but it is one of those confessions many a writer must get off his chest, and, happily, it is of some interest to the rest of us," said John Simon in New York magazine."

"The script is a verbal jungle, over-written, self-indulgent, littered with leaden symbolism and contrivance. But it refuses to be dismissed. The performances are too potent and disturbing, and for this Zindel deserves much credit," according to The Best Plays of 1988-1989.
