= Desolation Angels (band) =

Desolation Angels is an English heavy metal band. First playing in the 1980s, the band made a comeback in the 2010s.

== History ==
The band formed in 1981 and was a part of the new wave of British heavy metal. Having faced label issues, the band called it quits in 1994. In 2008, a boxed set of all their material was released, followed by a reunion of the band, releasing new material and re-releasing old material.

== Discography ==
- Desolation Angels (1986)
- While the Flame Still Burns (1990)
- English Bastards (EP, 1990)
- Feels Like Thunder (compilation box set, 2008)
- Sweeter the Meat (EP, 2014)
- King (2017)
- Burning Black (2022)
- Hounds of Hell (2026)
