= Desolation Angels (1995 film) =

- Directed by: Tim McCann
- Written by: Tim McCann
- Starring: Michael Rodrick; Jennifer Thomas; Peter Bassett
- Release date: 1995
- Country: United States
- Language: English

Desolation Angels is a 1995 independent film written and directed by Tim McCann.

The film premiered at the 1995 Telluride Film Festival. It then won the International Critics Prize (FIPRESCI Prize) at the Toronto International Film Festival and was accepted to the Rotterdam Film Festival.

== Cast ==
- Michael Rodrick as Nick
- Jennifer Thomas as Mary
- Peter Bassett as Sid
- Shannon Gold as Ralph
- Cheryl Clifford as Donna
- Frank Olivier as Otis (Gumby)
- Glenn Schuld as the Bartender
- Virginia D'Ruc as Sid's Mother
- Tracy Davis as the Store Manager
- Robert Bryson as the Tough Guy
- John Baker as the Workman
- Claes Lilja as the Man at the Party (credited as Eric Nielsen)
- Brett Reilly as the Man in the Bar
- Lewis Thompson as Gumby's Sidekick
- Eric Nielsen as the Man at the Party
- Elaine McMann as the Woman in the Store
- Helen McMann as the Scarf Woman
- Quentin Crisp

== Reception ==
In his review of Desolation Angels for Rolling Stone, Peter Travers declared that "male ego is the demon in this blazingly provocative debut film from the gifted Tim McCann," and concluded that viewers "won't stop talking about this one." Michael Wilmington of the Chicago Tribune praised the film as "an ultra-low budget drama of considerable accomplishment and sometimes extraordinary power" and wrote, "This is probably as devastating a portrayal and indictment of modern male insensitivity as any film has given us recently... One of the year's more impressive debuts." Jonathan Rosenbaum of the Chicago Reader described the film as "very unlike anything else in American filmmaking," deeming it "a film with an undeniable moral vision." The Los Angeles Times' Kevin Thomas called it "an utterly compelling portrait of depth and complexity," saying, "No wonder Jonathan Demme and Barbet Schroeder have joined forces in presenting Tim McCann's knockout debut feature... A thoroughly unsettling and sensitive drama of acute psychological insight."

Dave Kehr of the New York Daily News wrote, "McCann's grimly compelling Desolation Angels takes American independent filmmaking back to where it began – in the male angst of movies like John Cassavetes Husbands." The Village Voice' Amy Taubin wrote of the film, "A wrenching, smart and bleakly funny debut feature by the uncompromising and very talented Tim McCann... Outstanding." Paper magazine's Dennis Dermody characterized Desolation Angels as "harrowing and though provoking" and wrote, "The movie is so on target about all the macho bullshit that it makes you think Valerie Solanas was right."
