= Mary McDonnell =

American actress (born 1952)

- McDonnell at Dragon Con in 2026
- Born: Mary Eileen McDonnell; April 28, 1952 (age 74); Wilkes-Barre, Pennsylvania, U.S.
- Education: State University of New York at Fredonia
- Occupation: Actress
- Years active: 1972–present
- Spouse: Randle Mell (m. 1984; sep. 2021)
- Children: 2

Mary Eileen McDonnell (born April 28, 1952) is an American film, stage, and television actress. She received Academy Award nominations for her roles as Stands With A Fist in Dances With Wolves and May-Alice Culhane in Passion Fish. McDonnell is well known for her performances as President Laura Roslin in Battlestar Galactica, First Lady Marilyn Whitmore in Independence Day, and Rose in Donnie Darko. She was featured as Captain Sharon Raydor during seasons 5–7 of the TNT series The Closer and starred as Commander Sharon Raydor in the spin-off series Major Crimes on the same network. In 2023, she played Madeleine Usher in the miniseries The Fall of the House of Usher on Netflix.

== Early life and education ==
Mary Eileen McDonnell was born April 28, 1952, in Wilkes-Barre, Pennsylvania, one of six children born to Eileen (née Mundy) and John "Jack" McDonnell, a computer consultant. She is of Irish descent and was raised Roman Catholic. As a child, McDonnell relocated with her family to Ithaca, New York, where she spent the remainder of her upbringing. She attended the State University of New York at Fredonia. Her father died when she was 21 years old.

== Career ==
McDonnell appeared off-Broadway in two separate productions of Buried Child in 1978 and 1979, both times in the role of "Shelly". She won an Obie Award for Best Actress in 1981 for her work in the play Still Life. On Broadway, she has performed in productions of Execution of Justice, The Heidi Chronicles, and Summer and Smoke.

After more than 21 years of theater and television work, McDonnell made her film breakthrough in 1990 in Kevin Costner's Dances With Wolves as Stands With A Fist, the daughter of American settlers raised by Sioux Indians. Portraying the adopted daughter of Graham Greene's character Kicking Bird, McDonnell, then 37, was actually two months older than Greene and less than two years younger than Tantoo Cardinal, who played Black Shawl, her adoptive mother. She was nominated for an Academy Award for Best Supporting Actress for the role.

McDonnell's role in Passion Fish (1992) brought her another Academy Award nomination, this time for Best Actress in a Leading Role. Her other notable films include Grand Canyon (1991), Sneakers (1992), Independence Day (1996), and Donnie Darko (2001). McDonnell also starred with Patrick Swayze in the 1988 movie, Tiger Warsaw. In 1997, she played the judge in the film 12 Angry Men.

On television, McDonnell had her first regular part in 1980 on the soap opera As the World Turns. She starred in the 1984 short-lived CBS medical comedy E/R. Coincidentally, she guest-starred in 2001 on the NBC medical series of the same name ER. She was nominated for an Emmy Award for her role as Eleanor Carter on the show. She played Dr. Virginia Dixon, a surgeon with Asperger syndrome for three episodes of Grey's Anatomy in 2008 and 2009.

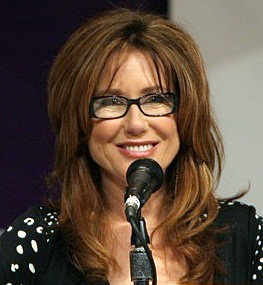
McDonnell at the 2007 San Diego Comic-Con

In 2003, McDonnell starred in the miniseries Battlestar Galactica as Laura Roslin. The miniseries led to the weekly series, with McDonnell reprising her Laura Roslin role. The series ended in March 2009. McDonnell received worldwide recognition for her performance in the show, part of which was shown when she was invited to the United Nations for a retrospective and discussion with Edward James Olmos (Admiral Adama).

McDonnell took part in a special session titled Battlestar Galactica at the 2009 World Science Festival. The session also included Michael Hogan, as well as scientists Hod Lipson and Kevin Warwick.

In 2011, she appeared in the role of Kate Roberts, the mother of Emma Roberts's character in Scream 4.

From 2009 to 2012, McDonnell had a recurring role in The Closer as Capt. Sharon Raydor, a police captain in the Force Investigation Division, who often butts heads with Kyra Sedgwick's Golden Globe and Emmy award-winning character. McDonnell received an Emmy nomination for Outstanding Guest Actress in a Drama Series in 2011 for the role.

After The Closer wrapped up its final season 2012, McDonnell's character continued as the lead in the spin-off, Major Crimes, which debuted August 13, 2012 and ended in January 2018.

On May 29, 2026, it was announced that McDonnell has joined the cast of Baywatch in a recurring role as Gayle Buchannon, the mother of Hobie Buchannon (Stephen Amell) and the grandmother of Charlie Vale (Jessica Belkin).

== Personal life ==
McDonnell married actor Randle Mell in 1984. They have two children, Michael and Olivia. The couple separated in December 2021.

== Filmography ==
=== Film ===
Year	Title	Role	Notes
1984	Garbo Talks	Lady Capulet	
1987	Matewan	Elma Radnor	
1988	Tiger Warsaw	Paula Warsaw	
1990	Dances With Wolves	Stands With A Fist	
1991	Grand Canyon	Claire	
1992	Passion Fish	May-Alice Culhane	
1992	Sneakers	Liz	
1994	Blue Chips	Jenny Bell	
1996	Independence Day	First Lady Marilyn Whitmore	
1996	Mariette in Ecstasy	Prioress	
1997	Woman Undone	Terri Hansen	
1998	You Can Thank Me Later	Diane	
1999	Mumford	Althea Brockett	
2001	Donnie Darko	Rose Darko	
2003	Nola	Margaret Langworthy	
2004	Crazy Like a Fox	Amy Banks	
2011	Scream 4	Kate Roberts	
2011	Margin Call	Mary Rogers	
2021	The Witcher: Nightmare of the Wolf	Lady Zerbst	Voice role
2025	Broke	Kathy Brandywine	
2027	One Second After †	Jen Matherson	Post-production

=== Television ===
Year	Title	Role	Notes
1980	As the World Turns	Claudia Colfax	Unknown episodes
1982	Money on the Side	Terri	Television film
1984–1985	E/R	Dr. Eve Sheridan	Main role; 20 episodes
1995–1996	High Society	Dorothy "Dott" Emerson	Main role; 13 episodes
1997	12 Angry Men	Judge Cynthia Nance	Television film
1998	Evidence of Blood	Dora Overton	Television film
1999	Replacing Dad	Linda Marsh	Television film
1999	Ryan Caulfield: Year One	Rachel Caulfield	2 episodes
2000	A Father's Choice	Susan Shaw	Television film
2000	For All Time	Laura Brown	Television film
2001–2002	ER	Eleanor Carter	5 episodes
2002	Touched by an Angel	Sister Theodore	Episode: "Minute by Minute"
2002	The Locket	Helen Staples	Television film
2003	Battlestar Galactica	President Laura Roslin	Television miniseries
2004–2009	Battlestar Galactica	President Laura Roslin	Main role; 71 episodes
2005	Mrs. Harris	Vivian Schulte	Television film
2008–2009	Grey's Anatomy	Dr. Virginia Dixon	3 episodes
2009	Killer Hair	Rose	Television film
2009	Hostile Makeover	Rose Smithsonian	Television film
2009–2012	The Closer	Captain Sharon Raydor	Recurring role (seasons 5–6); main cast (season 7); 23 episodes
2012–2018	Major Crimes	Captain (later Commander) Sharon Raydor	Main role
2017	Fargo	Ruby Goldfarb	4 episodes
2019	Veronica Mars	Jane	Episode: "Years, Continents, Bloodshed"
2021	Rebel	Helen Peterson	7 episodes
2023	The Fall of the House of Usher	Madeline Usher	Main role, miniseries
2026	The Boroughs	The Duchess	Episode: "Time to Go"
2026	VisionQuest	Katerina Wells	4 episodes

=== Stage ===
Year	Title	Role	Notes
1978	Buried Child	Shelly	Theater for the New City, Off-Broadway
1979	Buried Child	Shelly	Theatre de Lys, Off-Broadway
1980	After the Season	Alice Stewart	Emerson Colonial Theatre
1979	Letters Home	Sylvia Plath	The American Place Theatre, Off-Broadway
1981	Still Life	Cheryl	The American Place Theatre, Off-Broadway
1982	The Death of a Miner	Mary Alice Hager	The American Place Theatre, Off-Broadway
1981	A Midsummer Night's Dream	Helena	Arena Stage
1982	Black Angel	Simone Engel	Circle Repertory Company, Off-Broadway
1983	A Weekend Near Madison	Vanessa	Astor Place Theatre, Off-Broadway
1983	Red River	Hella	Goodman Theatre
1984	All Night Long	Jill	Second Stage Theater, Off-Broadway
1986	Execution of Justice	Mary Ann White	Virginia Theatre, Broadway
1986	A Doll House	Nora Helmer	Hartford Stage
1988	Three Ways Homes	Sharon	Astor Place Theatre, Off-Broadway
1988	National Anthems	Leslie Reed	Long Wharf Theatre
1989	The Heidi Chronicles	Heidi Holland (Replacement)	Plymouth Theatre, Broadway
1996	Summer and Smoke	Alma Winemiller	Criterion Center Stage Right, Broadway
2015	The Cherry Orchard	Lyubov Andreyevna Ranevskaya	People's Light & Theatre Company
2019	Gloria: A Life	Gloria Steinem	McCarter Theatre

== Awards and nominations ==
In 1992 McDonnell received an Outstanding Achievement Award from Fredonia's alumni association.

Year	Association	Category	Nominated work	Result
1991	Academy Awards	Best Supporting Actress	Dances With Wolves	Nominated
1991	Chicago Film Critics Association Awards	Best Supporting Actress	Dances With Wolves	Nominated
1991	Golden Globe Awards	Best Supporting Actress – Motion Picture	Dances With Wolves	Nominated
1993	Academy Awards	Best Actress	Passion Fish	Nominated
1993	Golden Globe Awards	Best Actress in a Motion Picture – Drama	Passion Fish	Nominated
2002	Primetime Emmy Awards	Outstanding Guest Actress in a Drama Series	ER	Nominated
2009	Saturn Awards	Best Actress on Television	Battlestar Galactica	Won
2011	Gotham Awards	Best Ensemble Cast	Margin Call	Nominated
2011	Phoenix Film Critics Society Awards	Best Cast	Margin Call	Nominated
2011	Primetime Emmy Awards	Outstanding Guest Actress in a Drama Series	The Closer	Nominated
2024	Astra TV Awards	Best Supporting Actress in a Limited Series or Television Movie	The Fall of the House of Usher	Nominated
2024	Critics' Choice Television Awards	Best Supporting Actress in a Movie/Miniseries	The Fall of the House of Usher	Nominated
2024	Critics' Choice Super Awards	Best Villain in a Series	The Fall of the House of Usher	Nominated
