= Carino of Balsamo =

Murderer of Saint Peter of Verona and later Dominican lay brother

Blessed Carino of Balsamo OP
- Domenichino, The Murder of Saint Peter Martyr.

Penitent
- Born: Cinisello Balsamo
- Died: 1293; Forlì
- Venerated in: Roman Catholic Church
- Feast: April 28

Blessed Carino Pietro of Balsamo (died 1293), sometimes called Saint Acerinus, was the murderer of Saint Peter of Verona ("Peter Martyr") who later repented his actions and became a Dominican lay brother. He is venerated as a beatus by the Catholic Church.

== Life ==
Prior to his entering the Dominican Order, Carino, was, according to Catholic tradition, a cruel man without scruples who had been hired by Milanese Cathars to kill Peter, a prominent Catholic inquisitor. Carino was a native of Cinisello Balsamo. The murder took place on April 6, 1252, when Peter was returning from Como to Milan. Carino's accomplice was named Manfredo Clitoro, of Giussano. The two assassins followed Peter as far as Barlassina, murdering him and mortally wounding Peter's companion Domenico at a lonely spot.

Carino split Peter’s head open, and mortally wounded Domenico. When he found that Peter was still breathing, he stabbed him with a dagger.

Carino fled to a Dominican monastery at Forlì, and confessed his crime to Giacomo Salomoni of Venice, also venerated as a beatus. Carino performed penances and became a lay brother there. Manfredo subsequently fled from the authorities and may have found refuge amongst the Waldenses in the Alps.

== Veneration ==
After his death, Carino was venerated by the people of Forlì.

The regulation of Carino's cult by the papacy began in 1822, but the death of Pius VII delayed the process, and the paperwork was misplaced. Carino is buried at the Cathedral of Forlì, and in 1934, Cinisello Balsamo obtained Carino's head, a translation at which Blessed Alfredo Ildefonso Schuster participated. Carino's feast day is celebrated on April 28, the day of this translation.

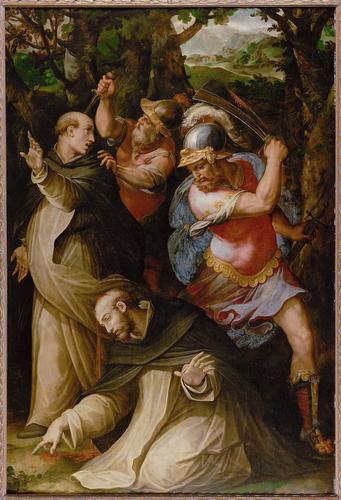
The murder of Peter Martyr, by Giorgio Vasari

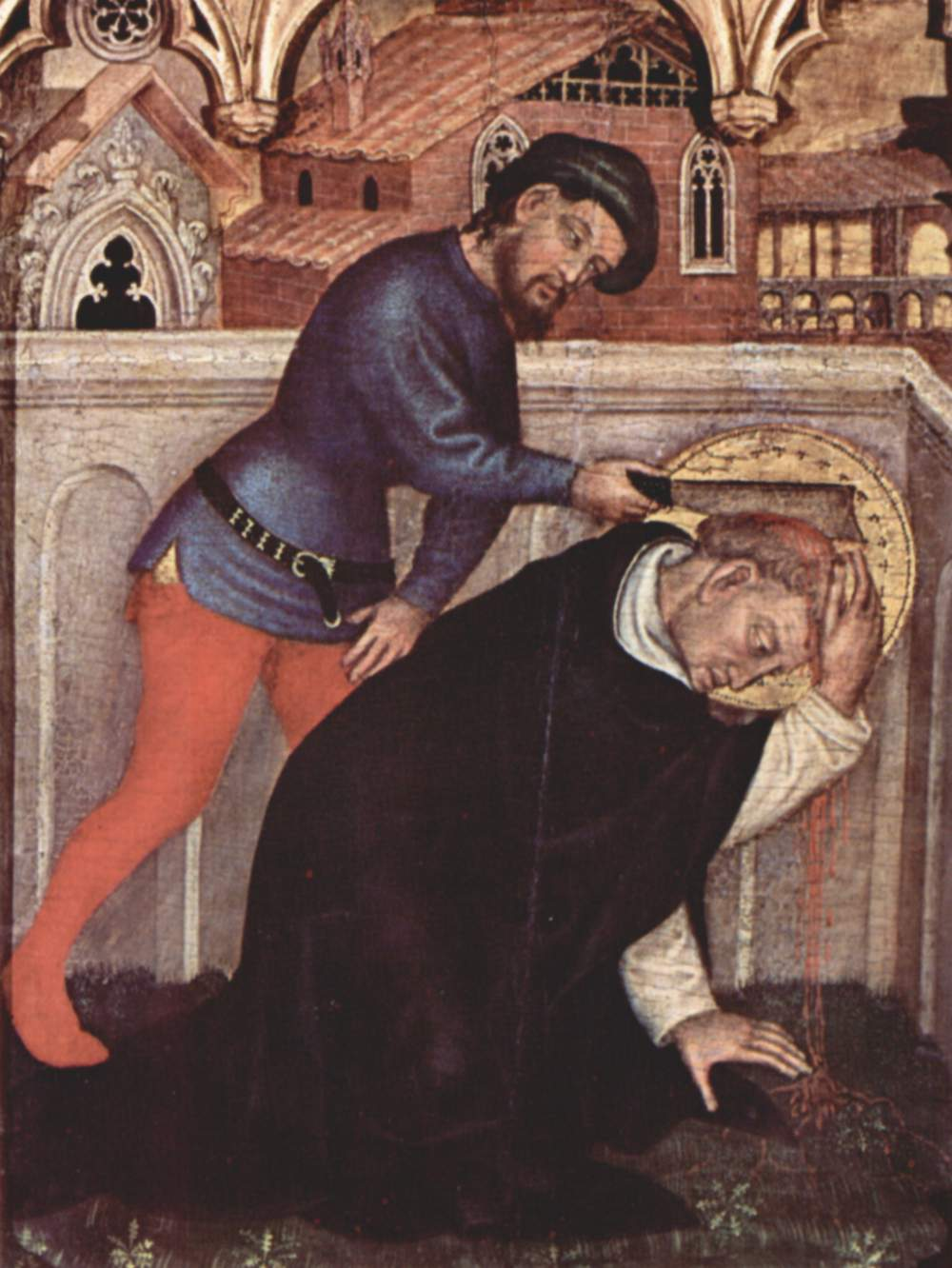
The murder of Peter Martyr, by Gentile da Fabriano

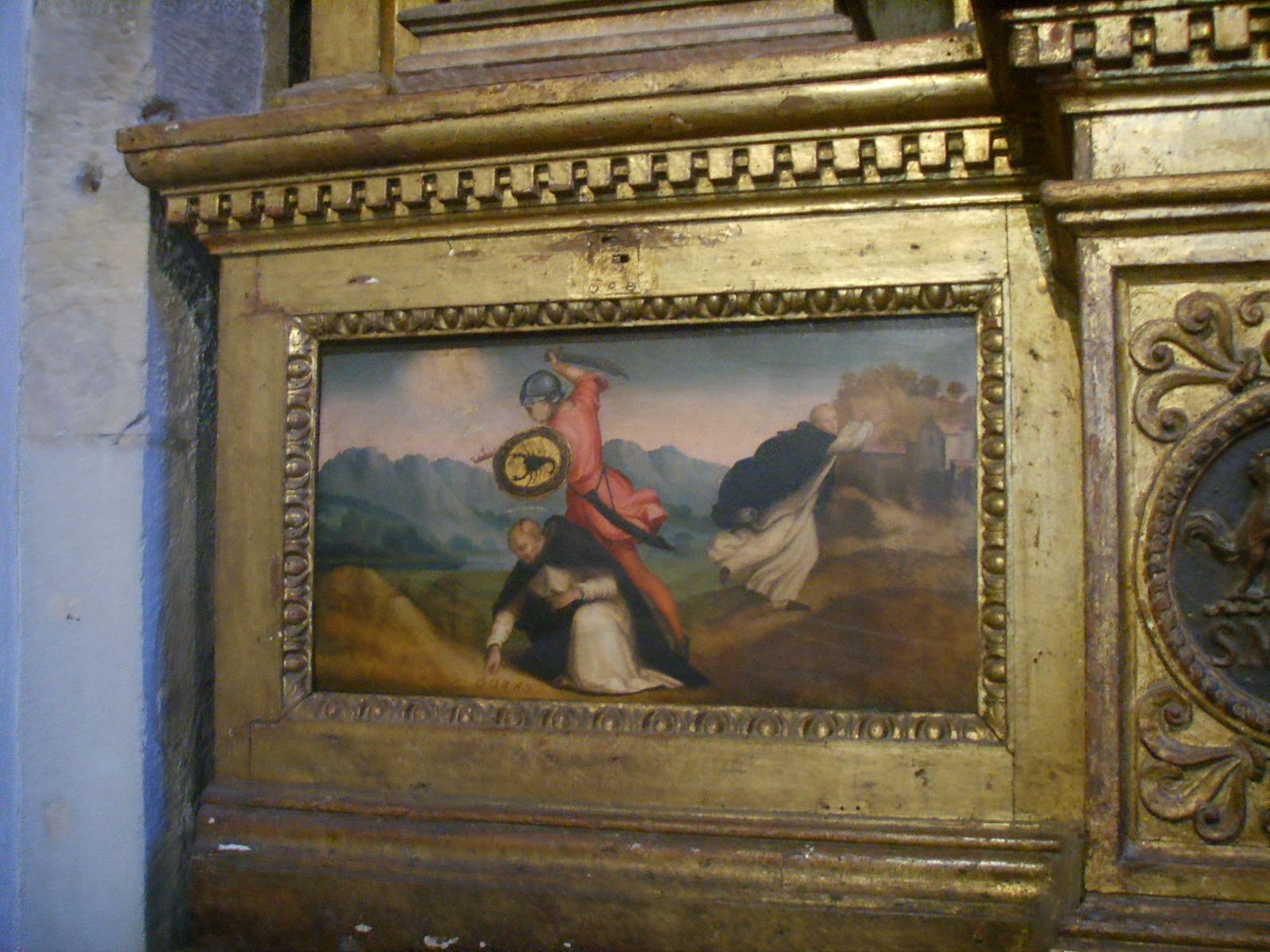
The murder of Peter Martyr, by Ridolfo del Ghirlandaio

== See also ==
- Sanctuary of San Martino
- Church of San Martino (Cinisello Balsamo)
