= Sanctuary of San Martino =

Sanctuary in Cinisello Balsamo, Italy

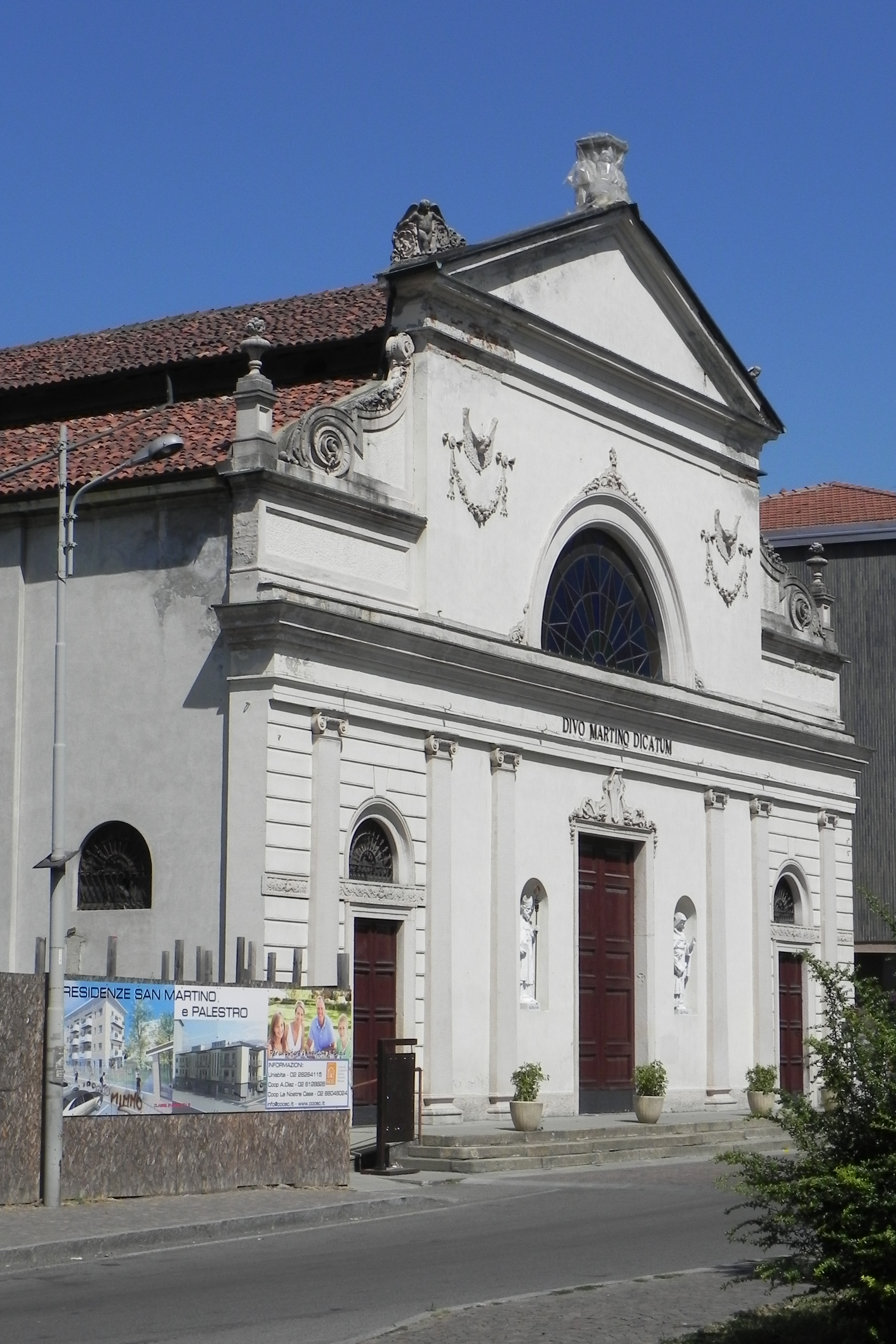
- The facade of the sanctuary

- Location within Italy
- 45.55072°N 9.22169°E
- Location: Cinisello Balsamo, Lombardy, Italy
- Address: Via San Martino
- Denomination: Catholic (Ambrosian Rite)
- Website: https://www.parrocchiasanmartino.it

History
- Dedication: Martin of Tours
- Consecrated: 1911

Architecture
- Style: Neoclassical architecture

Administration
- Archdiocese: Roman Catholic Archdiocese of Milan

The sanctuary (Note: The definition of "sanctuary" instead of "church" is traced back to 1978, when it had already lost its function as a parish church, replaced by the new church of San Martino, built in Piazza Soncino starting in 1957 and blessed in 1961. (Cf. Scurati (1987), pp. 189-191) The change of definition was probably intended, with the same dedication to Martin of Tours, to make a formal distinction between the two churches, valuing the fact that the relics of St. Saturninus and Blessed Balsamo Abbot were still preserved in the old church of St. Martin.) of San Martino Vescovo (Italian: Santuario di San Martino Vescovo) in Balsamo (of which he is the patron saint and protector) is a religious building in the city of Cinisello Balsamo, located at the confluence of Via San Saturnino (south) and Via San Martino (north), facing the Avenue of Remembrances. Historically, it has also been the reference church of the local Balsamese community for centuries, around which the city's built-up area developed until the early 20th century. (Note: Historically, both villages of Balsamo and Cinisello developed from the religious building, which played a central role in community life. The urban layout of the town therefore expanded over the centuries around these two centralities, only being disrupted following the union of the two municipalities (1928) and the subsequent building growth that merged Cinisello and Balsamo into Milan and its hinterland in a single urban continuity. See Guerci (2001), pp. 34-35.)

== History ==
The first historical news about a religious building dedicated to Martin of Tours dates back to the end of the 13th century, when an Ecclesia Sancti Martini belonging to the parish of Desio is reported within the list of churches of the Ambrosian archdiocese appended to Goffredo da Bussero's Liber Notitiæ Sanctorum Mediolani. The primitive building must have been certainly not modest in size, so much so that it had at least two altars inside, one of which was dedicated to Our Lady and located in a side chapel along the southern side of the church.

Subsequent historical records of the Ecclesia Sancti Martini, until the 19th century, are based exclusively on pastoral visits conducted from the mid-16th century onward. Their importance is crucial not only for the work of census and survey of the historical buildings present in the archdiocese, but because in many cases these visits were the driving force for the stylistic or architectural renovation of places of worship, as was also the case, moreover, for San Martino. However, the sources do not attest to any further details either on the style or on the actual dimensions of the building prior to the twentieth-century enlargement. From the pastoral visitation of Father Leonetto Clivone (Note: Leonetto Clivone (Vicenza, 1525 - Milan, 1572), a Jesuit, in Milan from 1565, was charged in 1566 by Charles Borromeo with the pastoral visitation of the parishes of Missaglia, Desio and Cantù as Visitator Deputatus per Illustrissimum et Reverendissimum dominum Mediolani Archiepiscopum in Executione dictae Commissionis. Cf. Biblioteca Ambrosiana, P. 7, F. 108 inf., fol 293-294, 333, 350-351, 414.) in 1567, it appears that the church was still substantially unchanged, characterized by a rectangular plan, a single nave, and a bell tower. The situation was unchanged at the visitation of Charles Borromeo to Balsamo on 8 July 1579, who in his delineatio still reported the baptistery and sacristy to the right of the choir. The oldest cartographic reproduction of the church known at present dates from this visit. It is an overall map of the parish of Desio, surveying both villages of Cinisello and Balsamo developed around the two respective churches. (Note: In any case, this is an entirely approximate and unrealistic representation of the settlements, in which the various hamlets with their names and streets are schematically shown. See Diocesan Historical Archives of Milan, Topographical Maps and Drawings Collection, formerly Section X, vol. 7.)

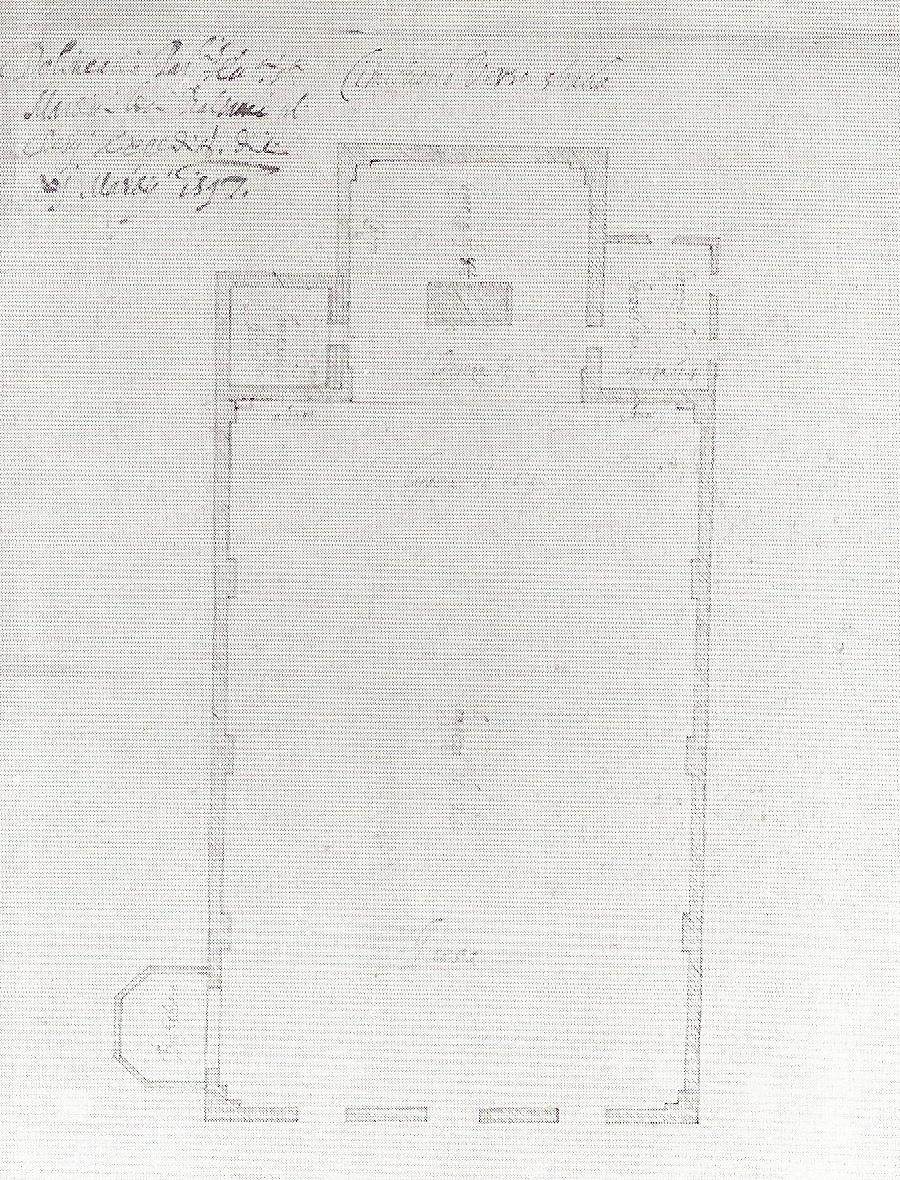
Floor plan of the church in Moneta's design, 1597

In the subsequent pastoral visitation conducted in 1596, Monsignor Baldassarre Cipolla (Note: Baldassarre Cipolla, a Jesuit, was commissioned by Federico Borromeo to make pastoral visits to a number of parishes, including Desio and Oggiono.) considered the building too small to accommodate all the faithful of Balsamo, suggesting an enlargement that, moreover, could coincide with the rebuilding of the church consistent with the new provisions of the Counter-Reformation. Therefore, the drafting of a project bearing the signature of a certain Moneta dates back to the following year, 1597, which included the transformation of the apse from semicircular to square, the replacement of the baptismal font with a polygonal baptistery (placed on the northern side of the building, near the facade) and the arrangement of the accesses to the bell tower and sacristy (communicating through two doors with the choir). On the other hand, the orientation of the church was maintained, with the apse placed to the west and the facade to the east, this one equipped with three entrances.

The work was completed in the early seventeenth century, (Note: Guerci reports 1608 as the latest date by which the work was to be finished. See Guerci (2001), p. 35. This date can be traced back to the visit of Monsignor Giovan Pietro Giussani (Milan, 1548 or 1552 - Monza, 1623) on 16 August 1608, from which, however, no further specifics or indications about the church of San Martino emerge. Reported in Prina (1995), p. 14; cf. Archivio Storico Diocesano di Milano, Sezione X, Visite Pastorali, Desio, vol. 23, Visita del Monsignor Giussani del 16.8.1608.) so much so that Federico Borromeo in his pastoral visit of 21 July 1604, attested to the presence of eight side chapels (whose dedication is not specified), the relocation of the baptismal font, the reconfiguration of the apse and the connection between the chancel and the bell tower, lamenting, however, the absence of the sacristy (the work on which was blocked at the foundations) and raising concerns about the overall dimensions of the building, which were still considered excessively small. The report of Monsignor Antonio Verri, (Note: Antonio Verri (1707-1784), in charge of the pastoral visit to the parish of Desio.) following his pastoral visit in 1745, finally turns out to be the last source documenting the original layout of the single-room church. An enrichment of the church furnishings and fittings was also recorded on that occasion. Subsequent to this visit, in 1758, a second map of the parish church of Desio was drawn up, which went on to confirm the situation already illustrated two centuries earlier by the previous one, with the villages of Cinisello and Balsamo huddled around the two churches.

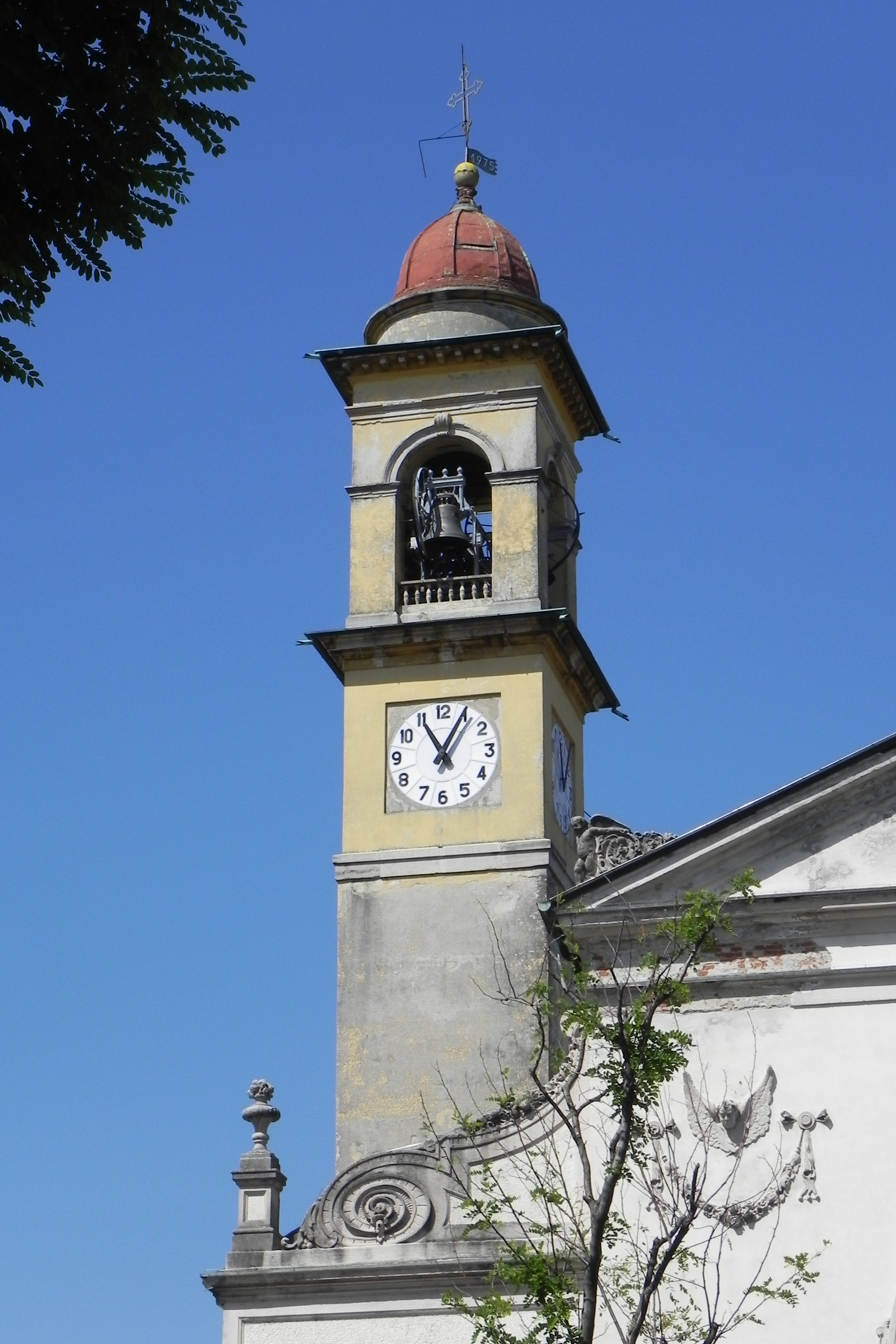
The bell tower, completed in 1856

In 1856 the present bell tower, more than sixty metres high, was completed and inaugurated, commissioned by Don Giovanni Prato, then parish priest of Balsamo. Until 1877 in the immediate vicinity of the church stretched linearly southward the historic cemetery of Balsamo, identified by a stationary cross (Note: Similar crosses, on the other hand, can still be found in front of the church of Sant'Ambrogio in Cinisello and the church of San Pietro Martire alla Crocetta. If the former, dating back to the 17th century, identified with certainty the ancient cemetery of Cinisello that extended all around the church, the latter, although probably dedicated to the victims of the plague, presents a still unknown origin. See also "Comune di Cinisello Balsamo, archivio storico". Archived from the original on 2 January 2021.) dating from the 16th century, now dispersed. Following donations of land by Marquise Cristiana Morosina, widow of Marquis Casati Stampa of Soncino, this could be relocated and enlarged in a more decentralized position with respect to the built-up area, located southeast of the previous one.

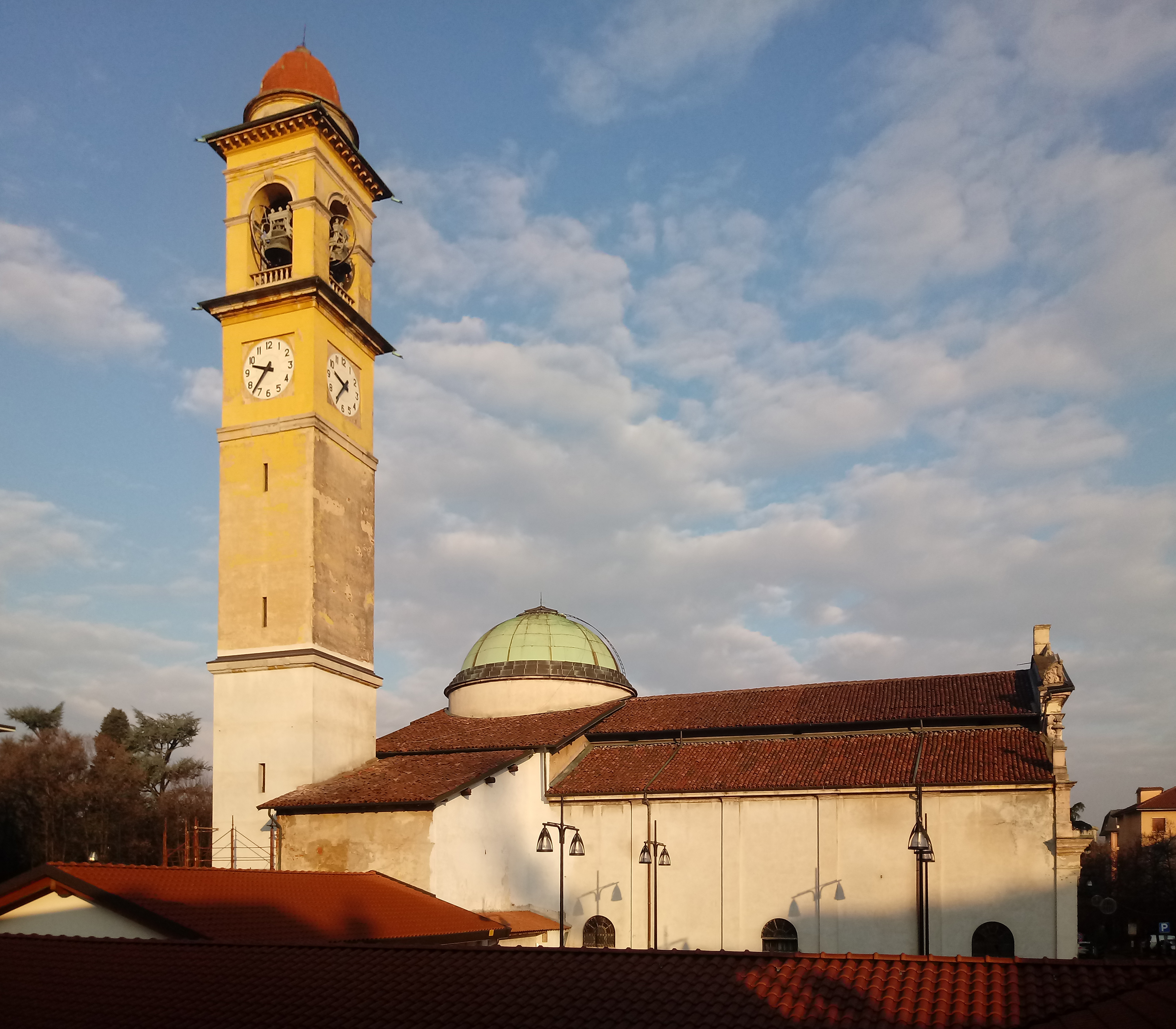
The sanctuary in 2020, as seen from the Pius XI Oratory, following 20th-century expansion work

The current layout of the sanctuary and the Latin cross apsidal layout with three naves (a major central nave and two minor side aisles) can be attributed to the major expansion works of the early 20th century, carried out under the guidance of Don Antonio Colombo. (Note: That is, over a period of time between 1899 and 1919. See Scurati (1987), pp. 63-64.) The church thus reached its current dimensions of 24 m wide by 30 m long, flanked from 1923 by the Pio XI oratory, designed by architect Oreste Scanavini.

As a result of the urban and demographic growth of Balsamo, which since 1928 had been united with Cinisello in the new municipality of Cinisello Balsamo, the church of San Martino came to find itself in a relatively marginal position in relation to the new urban settlements, which had developed in the direction of Cinisello. (Note: The arrival in Balsamo of the Milan-Bergamo highway in 1926 (inaugurated in 1927) marked a clean break in the territory, constituting a physical limit to its natural urban development. Subsequent building growth in the city would therefore develop north of the original Balsamo settlement, leaving the church of San Martino in a relatively peripheral position, almost abutting the highway embankment. See Scurati (1987), pp. 25-26.) It was therefore decided to build a new parish church, decentralized approximately half a kilometre further northeast, capable of providing a greater capacity for the faithful. The work took place between 1957 and 1961, when the new church of San Martino Vescovo, in Soncino Square, was blessed and opened for worship. Since then, the importance of the old church (since 1978 referred to as a sanctuary) has been waning, although it continued to be used to officiate some masses and celebrations until 2012.

In fact, during the earthquake of 27 January 2012, the crucifix detached from the statue of the Blessing Virgin (placed on top of the facade) and some tiles: the statue was secured and removed, while the entire building was declared unfit for use by the Fire Department.

In August 2022, restoration work on the bell tower was completed. On 25 September the bells resumed ringing.

== Description ==
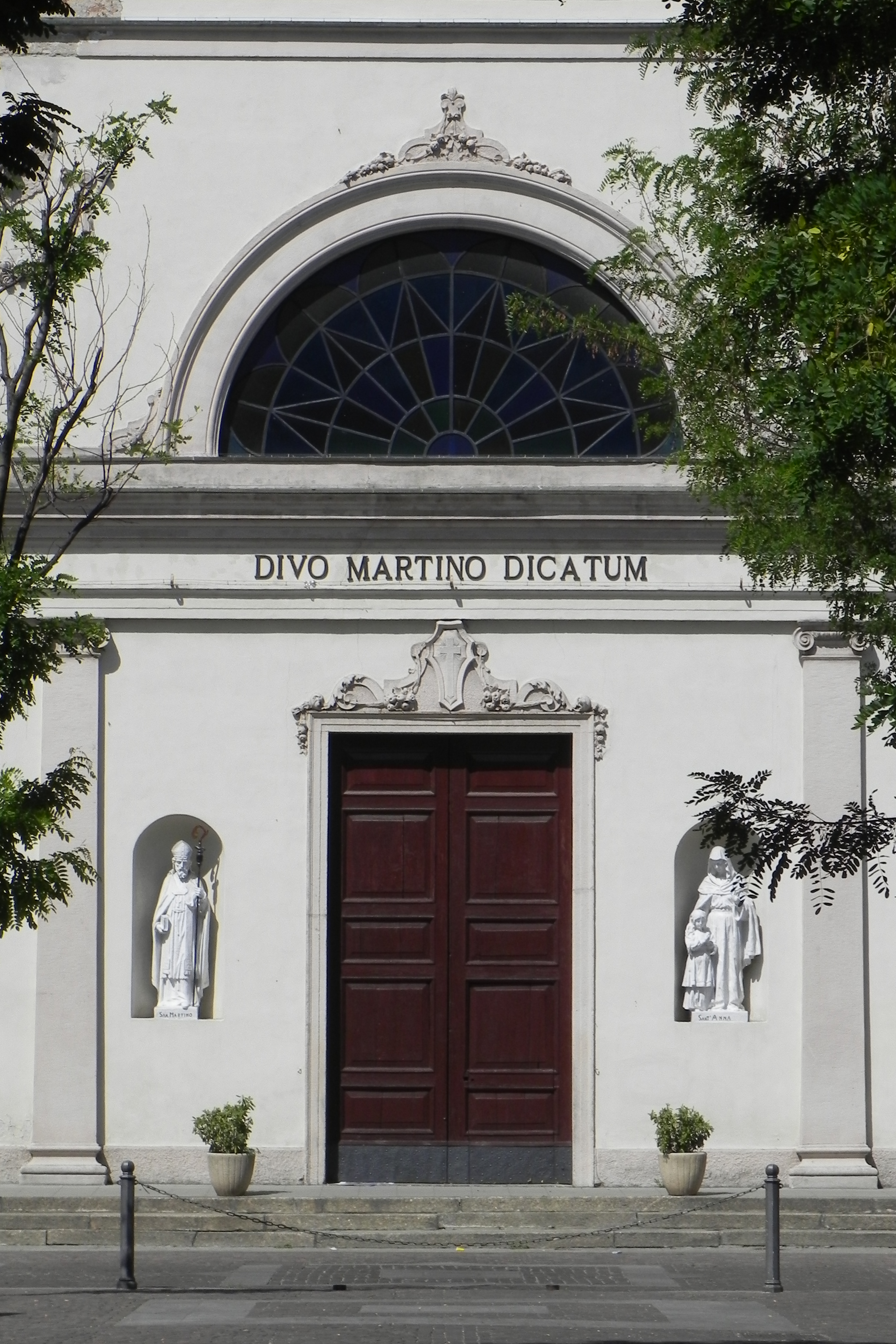
Detail of the facade, with the semicircular stained glass window

The sanctuary is oriented in an east-west direction, with the facade set to the east and the apse to the west. The building is externally white-plastered, with the roof covered with terracotta tiles: in fact, its only two highlights are the dome, which fits into the transept, and the facade, characterized by a semicircular stained-glass window and some statues.

=== Facade ===
The facade of the sanctuary clearly shows the internal division of the rooms: on the lower level, the three naves are marked by six lesenes that frame - on the sides - the two minor entrances to the church, characterized by an ashlar decorative layout, consisting of plaster on masonry. The main portal opens at the nave, made of carved wood, with a mixtilinear cymatium, decorated with plant motifs and a central shield with a cross; on either side of the portal are two niches, containing a statue of Martin of Tours (left) and a statue of St. Anne with the Child Mary (right), respectively. The lower floor is visually divided from the upper floor by a thick string-course band, in the centre of which is the stucco inscription "DIVO MARTINO DICATUM." (Note: From Latin, "Dedicated to St. Martin.") Above this is a semicircular stained-glass window, flanked on either side by two bas-reliefs with cherubs and festoons with plant motifs, also made of stucco. Lastly, crowning the upper floor is a triangular tympanum, which bears at the top a statue of the Blessing Virgin (holding a large crucifix in her left hand) (Note: Removed following the earthquake tremor on 27 January 2012. Cfr. "Comune di Cinisello Balsamo - Scossa di terremoto avvertita anche a Cinisello Balsamo: la Polizia Locale in azione per controlli e accertamenti". Archived from the original on 27 June 2015.) and at the sides two cherubs; below these, two volutes connect the upper and lower central parts.

=== Bell tower ===
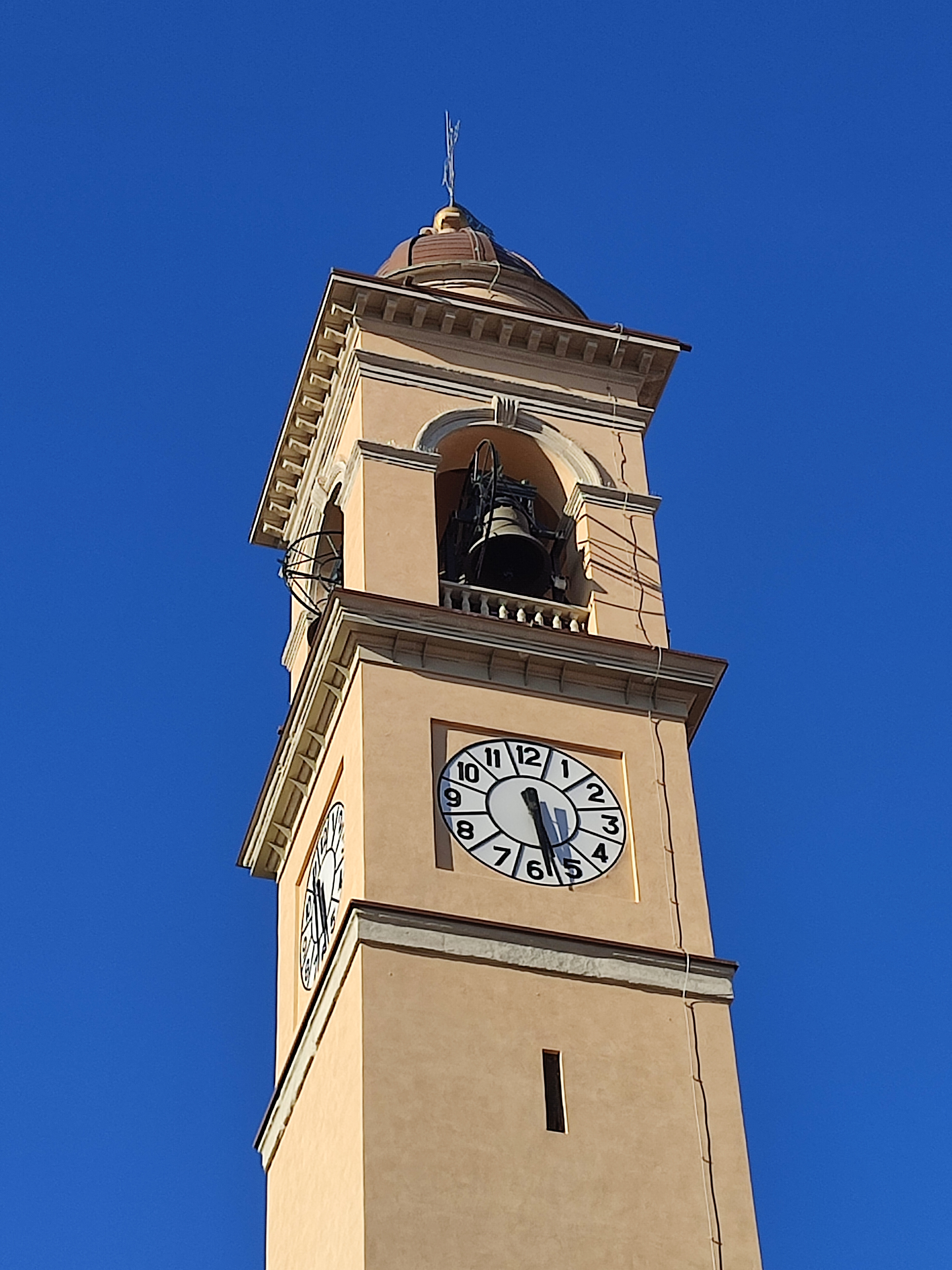
The bell tower of St. Martin's sanctuary in 2022, following restoration work

The bell tower, with a square cross-section, is located at its southwestern end and is of a yellow-ochre hue, surmounted by a red dome. Above the clocks, which are present on all four sides, is the belfry, containing five bells (the three major ones located to the north, east and south and the two minor ones located to the west). These are historical examples, having survived the requisitions of the war, when the fascist government ordered their confiscation for weapons production. In early 1943, in fact, the three major bells were lowered from the belfry and delivered to the historic Barigozzi foundry in Milan for casting. However, due to the armistice announced on September 8, they were never melted down and returned to Balsamo while the war was still in progress, thanks to a stratagem of Don Piero Carcano who, having managed to get them back and clandestinely transport them to the village, kept them hidden in a haystack.

=== Interior ===
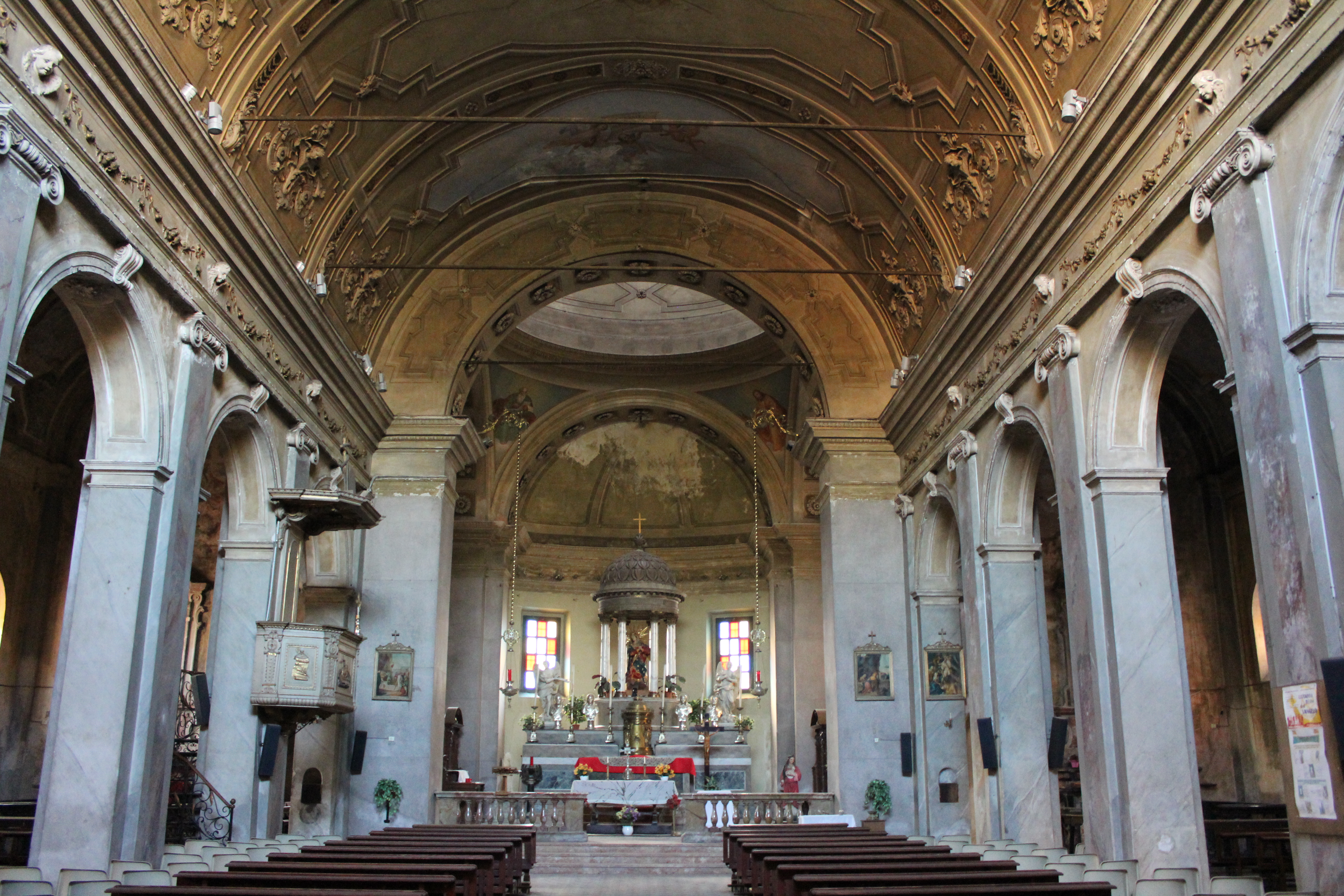
Interior of the sanctuary

The interior features a cycle of frescoes made starting in 1892 by Lombard painter Carlo Farina, commissioned by the then parish priest of Balsamo Don Giuseppe Molgora. They cover the ceiling of the nave, with putti in flight alternating with bishop's emblems, and the four pendentives of the dome, with the four evangelists (St. Matthew with an angel, St. Mark with a lion, St. John with an eagle, and St. Luke writing the Gospel), depicted in robes of dull colours, with brown, green, and red tones predominating. In contrast, the dome depicts Martin of Tours, wearing a yellow vestment and mitre, with black and white pallium on his chest and crosier in his right hand, carried in glory by a host of angels. Also belonging to the same decorative campaign would be two circular medallions, with a sky-blue background, depicting St. Ambrose and St. Charles Borromeo, placed in the left and right transept vaults, respectively. In particular, St. Ambrose is portrayed in a purple chasuble, with a yellow mitre and white pallium with black crosses on his chest; in his left hand, he carries a lash, while his right hand is raised in blessing. To a later decorative campaign, (Note: In fact, it is recorded that the addition of the aisles took place in a period of time between 1899 and 1919 during the regency of Don Antonio Colombo; therefore, it is impossible for Farina to have been able to decorate them since he only worked on them around 1892.) on the other hand, belong the decorations on the back wall of the right aisle; these depict a frescoed altar within an apse with a coffered dome, surrounded by Corinthian columns, while on the curved cymatium are two putti holding an oval with Mary's heart crowned with thorns.

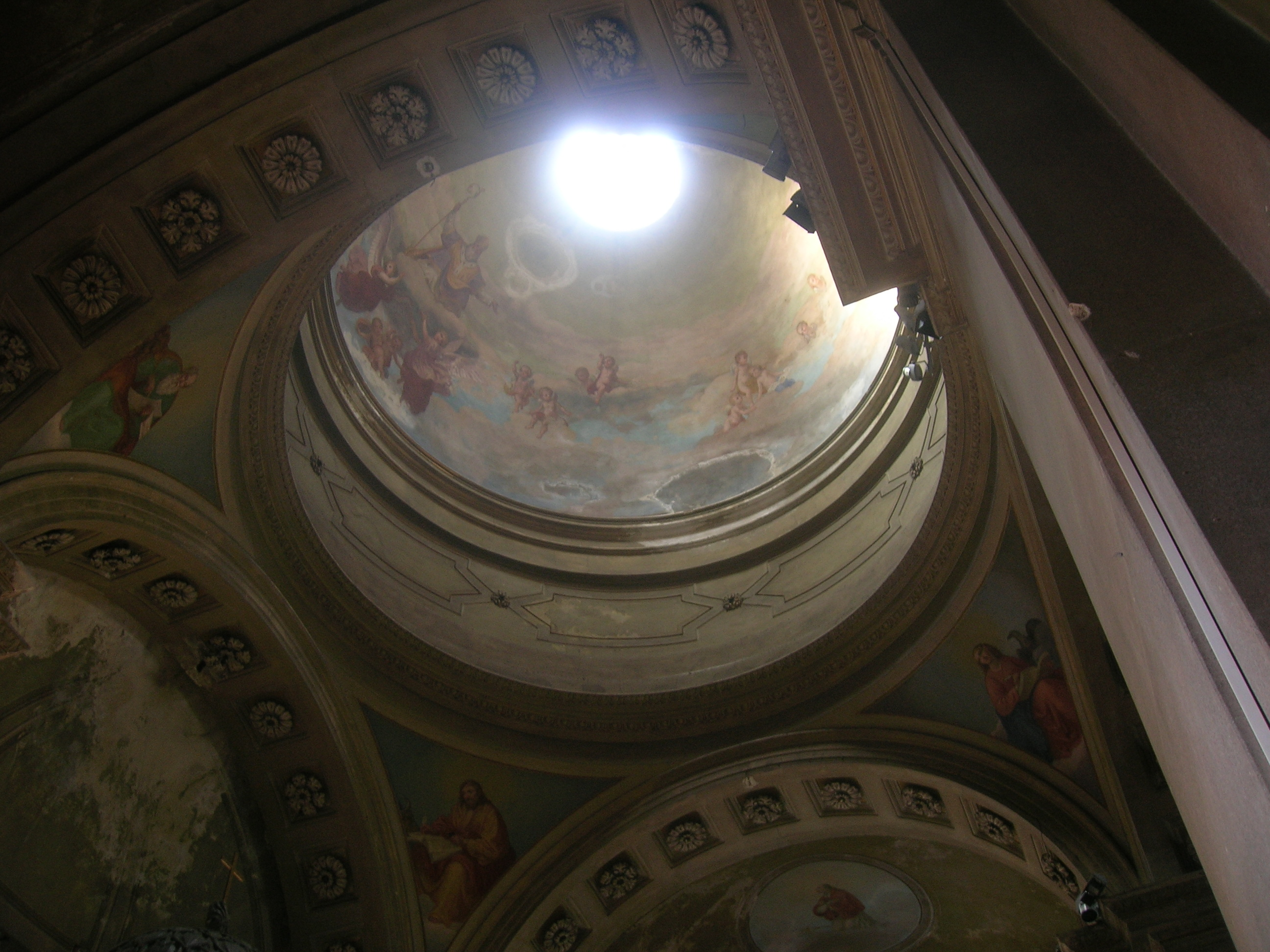
The soffit of the dome

Of particular artistic significance are the sacred furnishings preserved there: in fact, a wooden statue depicting Christ at the Column, placed inside the niche of the altar of the same name, located in the left aisle, and a second one depicting Our Lady of Sorrows, located in the right aisle, are reported. Both statues come from the demolished church of San Michele in Monza, (Note: Scurati reports on the merits of the provenance from the church of Santa Marta: in fact, the contradiction is only apparent, as both belonged to a complex of two adjacent convents (that of the White Nuns and that of San Michele), of which only the small oratory of Santa Marta, in Piazza San Paolo, survives today. Cf. Scurati (1987), p. 189.) and were placed in the sanctuary on 24 October 1789, replacing the previous altars dedicated to Our Lady of the Snow and Virgin of the Rosary.

In the presbytery, on the other hand, the relics of St. Saturninus are kept under the high altar (made between 1825 and 1849). Transported there between 16 and 18 October 1926, (Note: They were previously kept at the church of Sant'Angelo, in Milan: in fact, here they were reportedly found by Don Emilio Griffini during an inventory conducted during his seminary days. He, who later became parish priest of Balsamo, would officially request them so that he could add value to his own parish. Cf. Scurati (1975), pp. 85-86.) they are placed in a chiselled bronze and crystal urn, the work of architect Scanavini. Also preserved in the church is the tibia of Blessed Balsamo Abate, which arrived in Balsamo in 1935, along with another of his relics. The head and other relics that belonged to Blessed Carino of Balsamo were moved there from Forli Cathedral in 1934 and are currently kept at the new church of San Martino. (Note: The head and other relics returned to Blessed Carino's hometown also thanks to the interest of Fr. Emilio Griffini, in 1934. About 30 years later, on 4 November 1964, the head would be followed by the entire body, permanently transferred from the Cathedral of Forli to Balsamo, where it was reassembled under the altar of the crypt of the new church of San Martino, by the parish priest Don Piero Carcano. See Scurati (1975), pp. 86-87; Scurati (1987), pp. 46-47.)

Of some interest are also the chancel, in the left transept, and the pulpit, set against a wall in the nave. The former, made of carved and painted cream-coloured wood with gilded friezes, is divided into five mirrors, each of which is decorated in relief with whirls, musical instruments and sheet music; the second, also made of cream-painted wood, with relief friezes, has the parapet divided into compartments, depicting the mystic lamb and a number of cards with sacred inscriptions, and below the canopy the Dove of the Holy Spirit, in relief, along with a cross with a serpent and the tables of commandments.

=== Pipe organ ===
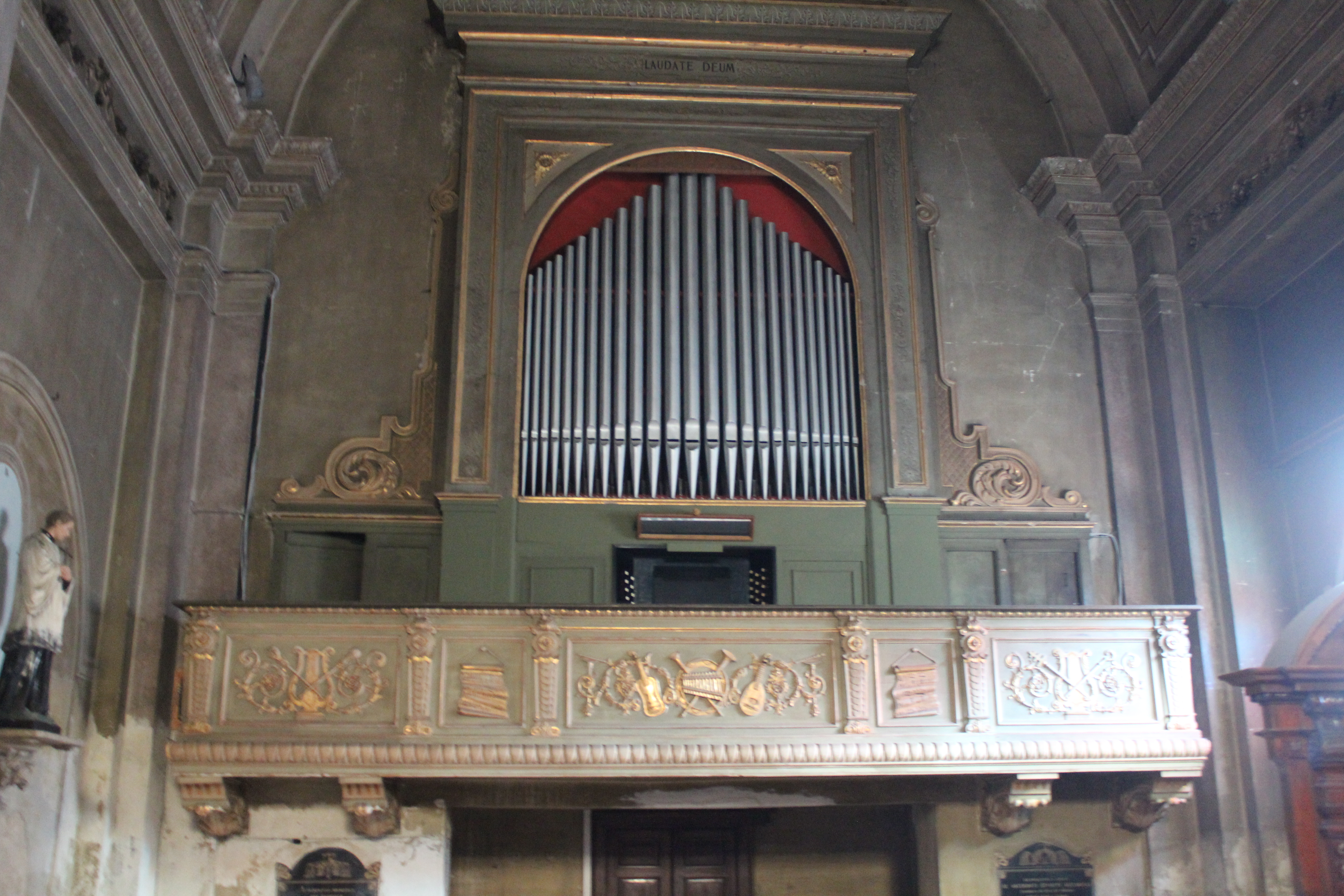
Pipe organ

On the chancel in the left arm of the transept is the pipe organ, built in the early 20th century by the Aletti brothers of Monza.

The instrument has tracker action and has a window console with two keyboards of 58 notes each and a straight pedalboard of 27 notes. The wooden case, in neoclassical style, is of simple geometric workmanship and frames the loft, which consists of 25 zinc principal pipes arranged in a single cusp.

== Gallery ==
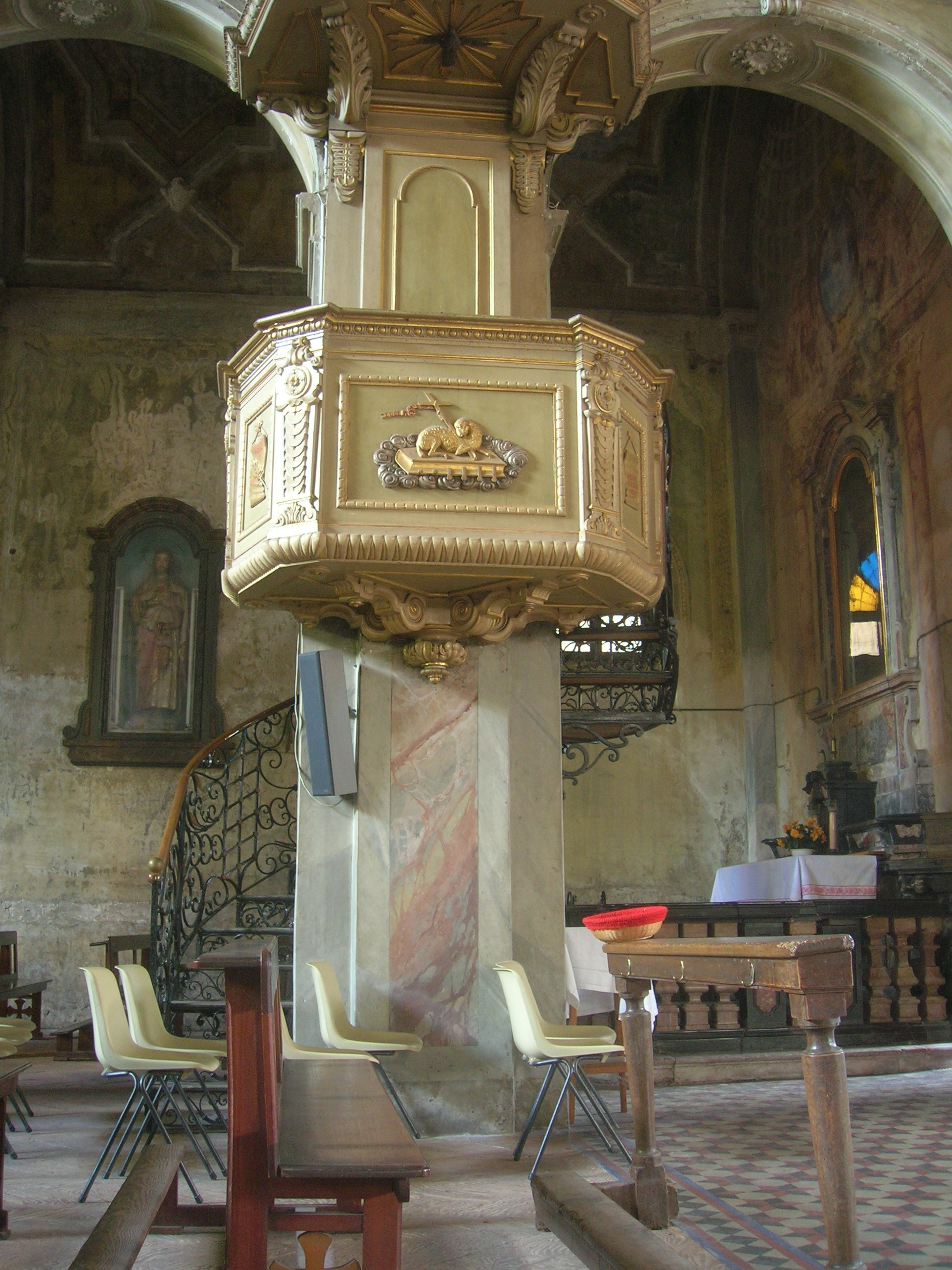
The pulpit

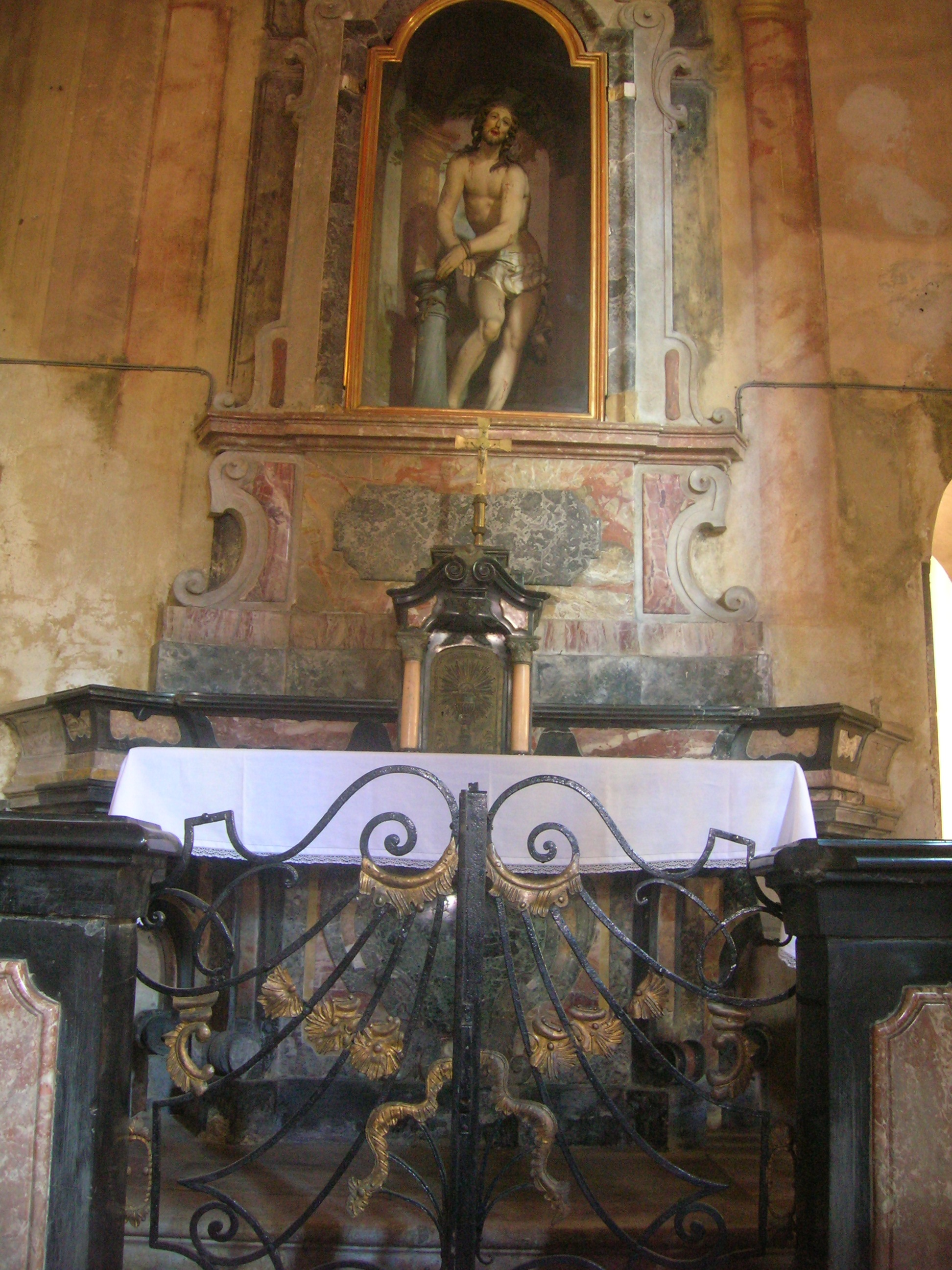
Christ at the Column

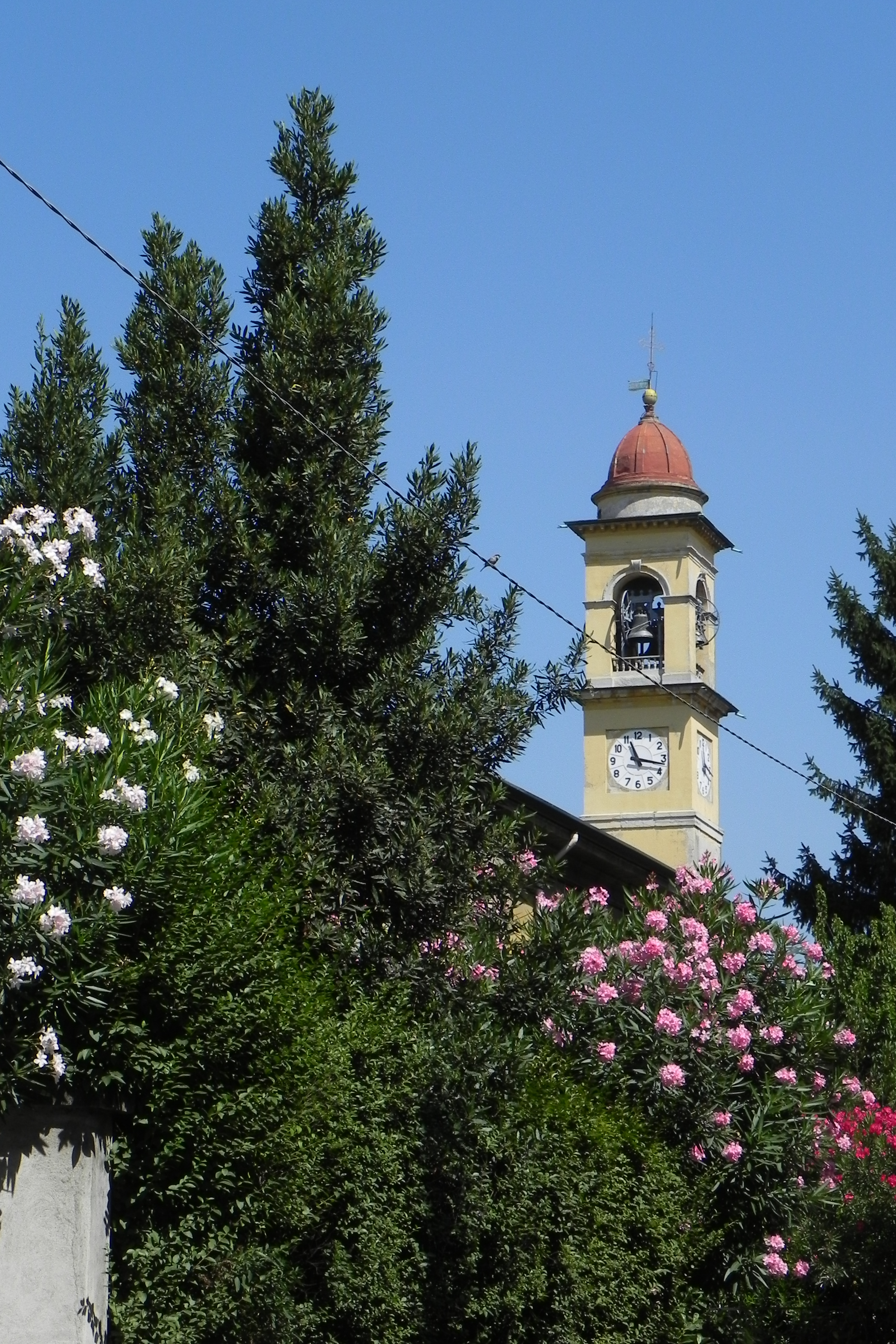
The bell tower of San Martino in Balsamo, behind the oleanders of the Pius XI Oratory

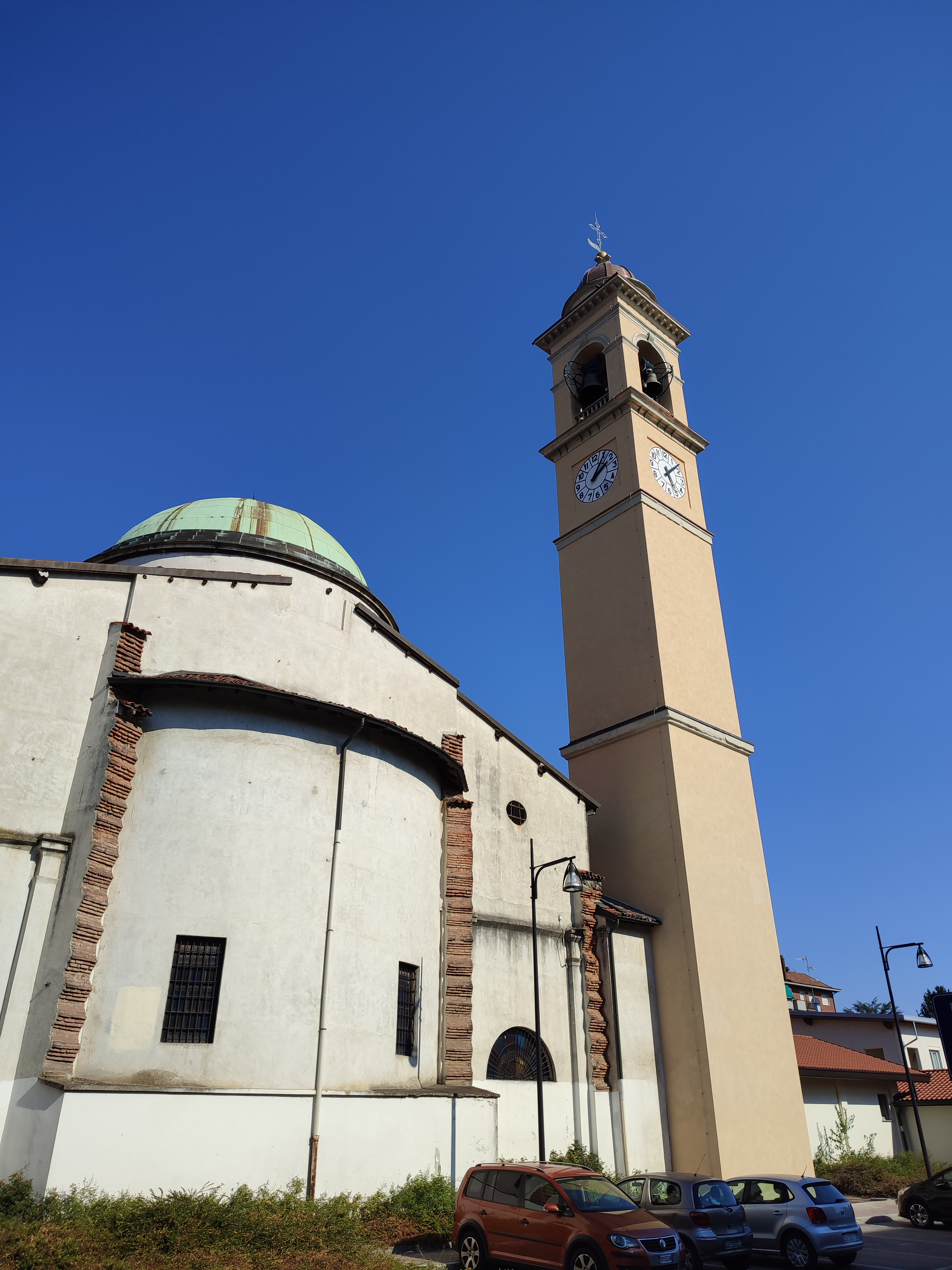
The back of the San Martino sanctuary in Cinisello Balsamo in 2022, following restoration work on the bell tower
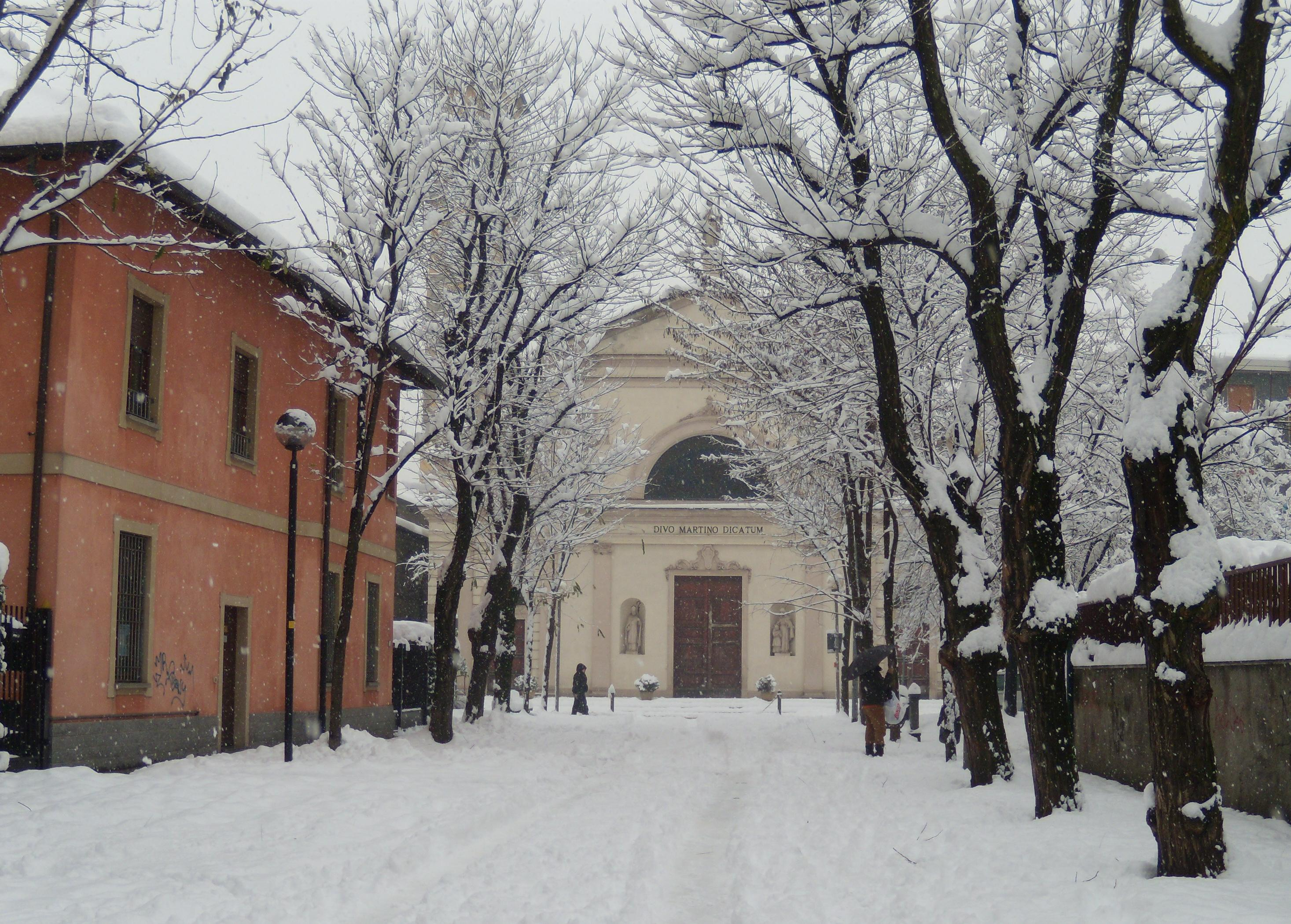
The sanctuary in winter

== See also ==
- Cinisello Balsamo
- Martin of Tours
- Carino of Balsamo

== Bibliography ==
- Alberto Scurati (1975). Storia di Cinisello Balsamo. Cinisello Balsamo: Comune di Cinisello Balsamo.
- Alberto Scurati (1987). L'enciclopedia di Cinisello Balsamo. Cinisello Balsamo: Comune di Cinisello Balsamo.
- Francesca Prina (1995). La "geografia sacra" delle visite pastorali e l'architettura religiosa tra medioevo ed età moderna, in Cinisello Balsamo. Duemila anni di trasformazioni nel territorio. Cinisello Balsamo: Comune di Cinisello Balsamo.
- Gabriella Guerci, ed. (2001). I beni culturali a Cinisello Balsamo. Cinisello Balsamo: Comune di Cinisello Balsamo.
