= Peter of Verona =

Italian Roman Catholic priest (1205–1252)

Saint Peter of Verona OP
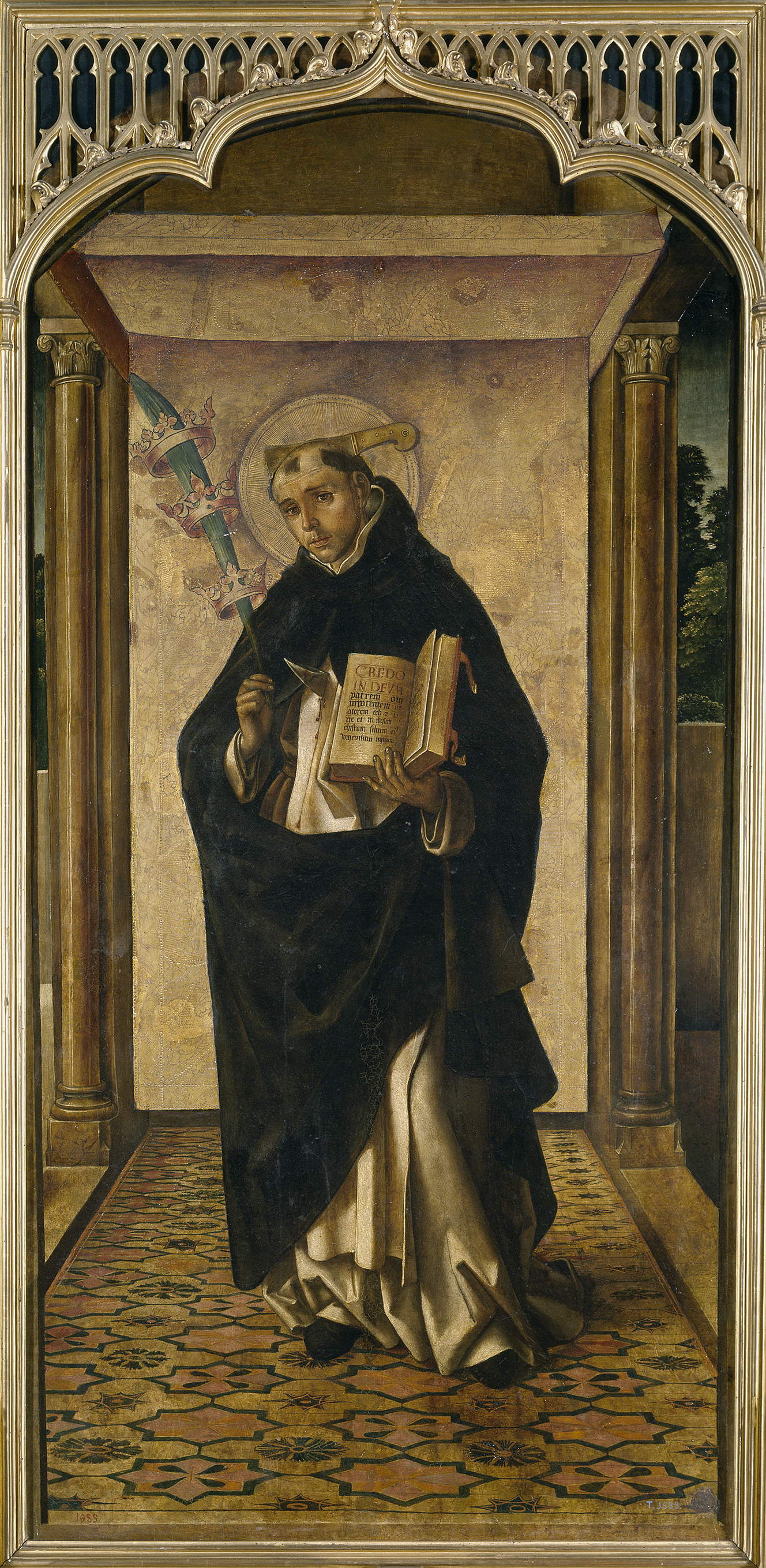
- Saint Peter the Martyr by Pedro Berruguete

Martyr
- Born: 29 October 1205; Verona, Italy
- Died: 6 April 1252 (aged 46); Milan, Italy
- Venerated in: Roman Catholic Church
- Canonized: 9 March 1253, Perugia, Italy by Pope Innocent IV
- Feast: 29 April
- Attributes: religious habit of a Dominican, hatchet, cleaver, or sword in his head or a severe head wound; the words Credo or Credo in unum Deum
- Patronage: Order of Preachers, Inquisitors, midwives, Lombardy, Como, Cremona, Duchy of Modena and Reggio, Guaynabo, Puerto Rico

Peter of Verona (29 October 1205 – 6 April 1252), also known as Saint Peter Martyr and Saint Peter of Verona, was a 13th-century Italian Catholic priest. He was a Dominican friar and a celebrated preacher. He served as Inquisitor in Lombardy, was killed by an assassin, and was canonised as a Catholic saint 11 months after his death — the fastest canonisation in history.

== Biography ==
Thomas Agni da Lentini, Dominican archbishop of Cosenza, and later patriarch of Jerusalem, was the first to write a biography of Peter of Verona. He lived with Peter of Verona for many years and had been his superior.

Peter was born in the city of Verona into a family perhaps sympathetic to the Cathar heresy. Peter went to a Catholic school and later to the University of Bologna, where he is said to have maintained his orthodoxy and, at the age of fifteen, met Dominic of Osma. Peter joined the Order of the Friars Preachers, also known as the Dominican Order, and became a celebrated preacher throughout northern and central Italy.

From the 1230s on, Peter preached against heresy, and especially Catharism, which had many adherents in thirteenth-century Northern Italy. Pope Gregory IX appointed him General Inquisitor for northern Italy in 1234, and Peter evangelized nearly the whole of Italy, preaching in Rome, Florence, Bologna, Genoa, and Como. He is credited with founding, c. 1240, the Venerabile Arciconfraternita della Misericordia di Firenze.

In 1243, he recommended the new Servite foundation to the pope for approval. In 1245, he led two battles against Cathars in Florence, in which he was victorious. In 1251, Pope Innocent IV recognised Peter's virtues, among them the severity of his life and doctrine, his talent for preaching, and his zeal for the orthodox Catholic faith, and appointed him Inquisitor in Lombardy. He spent about six months in that office, and it is unclear whether he was ever involved in any trials. His one recorded act was a declaration of clemency for those confessing heresy or sympathy to heresy.

In his sermons, he denounced heresy and also those Catholics who professed the faith by words, but acted contrary to it in deeds. Crowds came to meet him and followed him; conversions were numerous, including those of many Cathars who returned to the Catholic church.

Because of this, a group of Milanese Cathars conspired to kill him. They hired an assassin, Carino of Balsamo. Carino's accomplice was Manfredo Clitoro of Giussano. On 6 April 1252, when Peter was returning from Como to Milan, the two assassins followed Peter to a lonely spot near Barlassina, and there killed him and mortally wounded his companion, a fellow friar named Domenico.

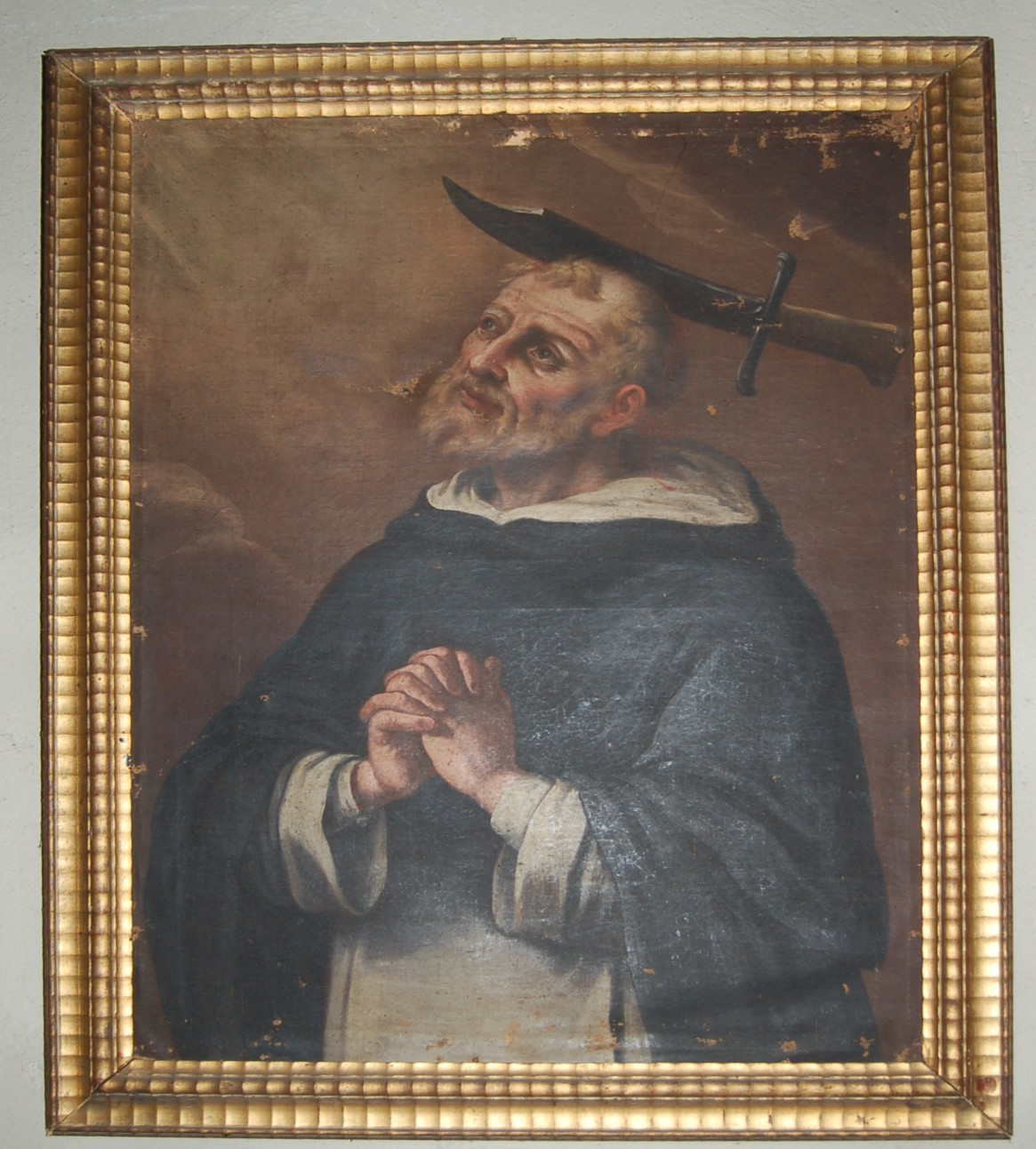
Saint Peter Martyr (unknown painter)

Carino struck Peter's head with an axe and then attacked Domenico. Peter rose to his knees and recited the first article of the Apostles' Creed. Offering his blood as a sacrifice to God, according to legend, he dipped his fingers in it and wrote on the ground: Credo or Credo in unum Deum, the first words of the creed. The blow that killed him cut off the top of his head, but the testimony given at the inquest into his death confirms that he began reciting the Creed when he was attacked. Domenico was carried to Meda, where he died five days afterwards.

== Legends ==
According to Dominican tradition, Peter often conversed with the saints, including the virgin martyrs Catherine, Agnes, and Cecilia.

Once, when preaching to a vast crowd under the burning sun, the heretics challenged him to procure shade for his listeners. According to the legend, a cloud overshadowed the audience as he prayed.

== Veneration ==
Peter's body was carried to Milan and laid in the Church of Sant'Eustorgio, where an ornate mausoleum, the work of Balduccio Pisano, was erected to his memory. Since the eighteenth century this has been located in the Portinari Chapel.

Many miracles were attributed to him during his life and even more after his martyrdom.

Peter's canonisation by Pope Innocent IV on 9 March 1253 was the fastest in papal history. St Peter the Martyr's feast day is 6 April although his Dominican brothers celebrate it on 4 June. From 1586, when the feast day was inserted in the General Roman Calendar, to 1969, when it was removed on the grounds of the limited importance now attached to the saint internationally, the celebration was on 29 April; 6 April, the date of his death, was not used because it would too often conflict with the Easter Triduum. The Church of Santa Maria Antiqua in Verona is co-entitled to him.

Carino, the assassin, later repented and confessed his crime. He converted to the Catholic church and eventually became a lay brother in the Dominican convent of Forlì. He is the subject of a local cult as Blessed Carino of Balsamo.

The sculptures on the great door of S. Anastasia, the Dominican Church in Verona, represent scenes from the life of St. Peter Martyr.

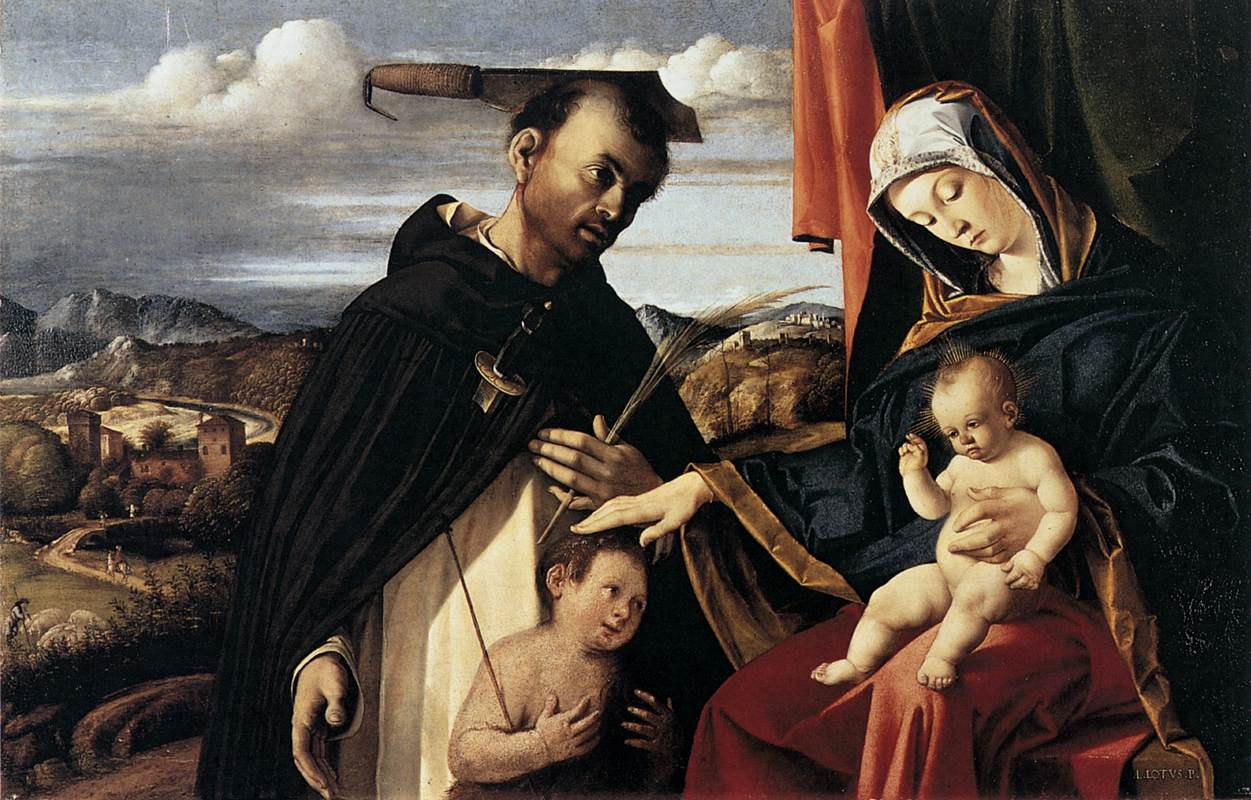
Madonna and Child with St Peter Martyr, by Lorenzo Lotto

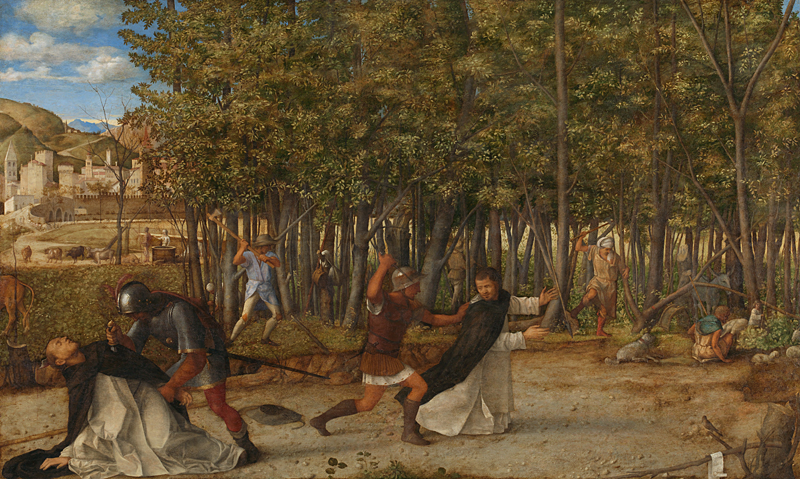
The Assassination of Saint Peter Martyr, by Giovanni Bellini

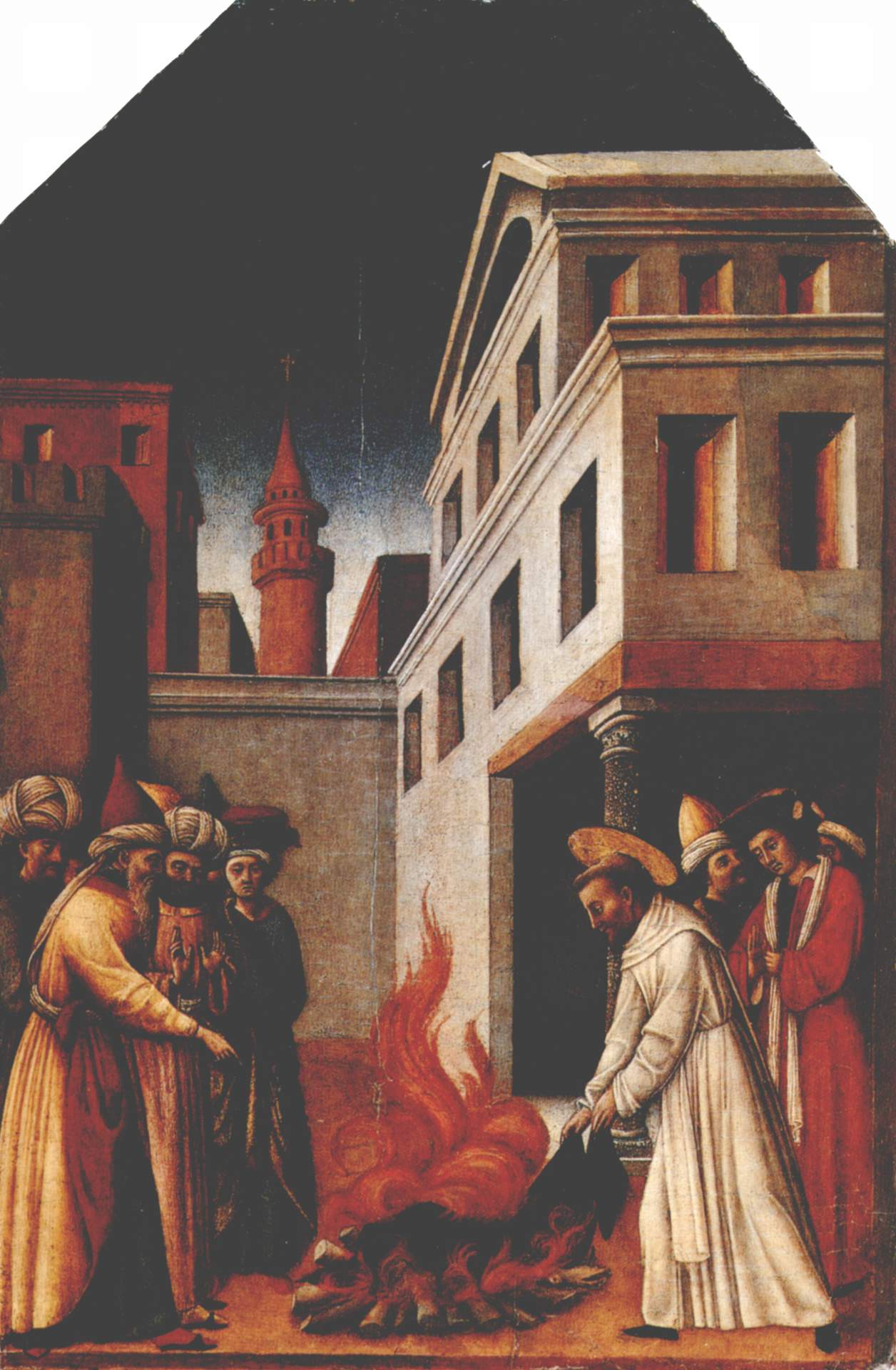
The fire miracle of Saint Peter Martyr by Antonio Vivarini

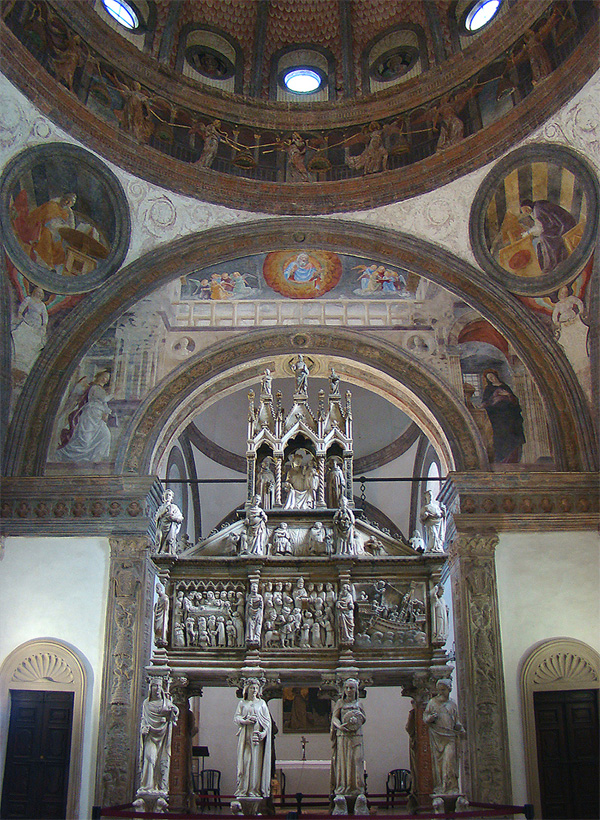
Tomb in Basilica of Sant'Eustorgio, Milan

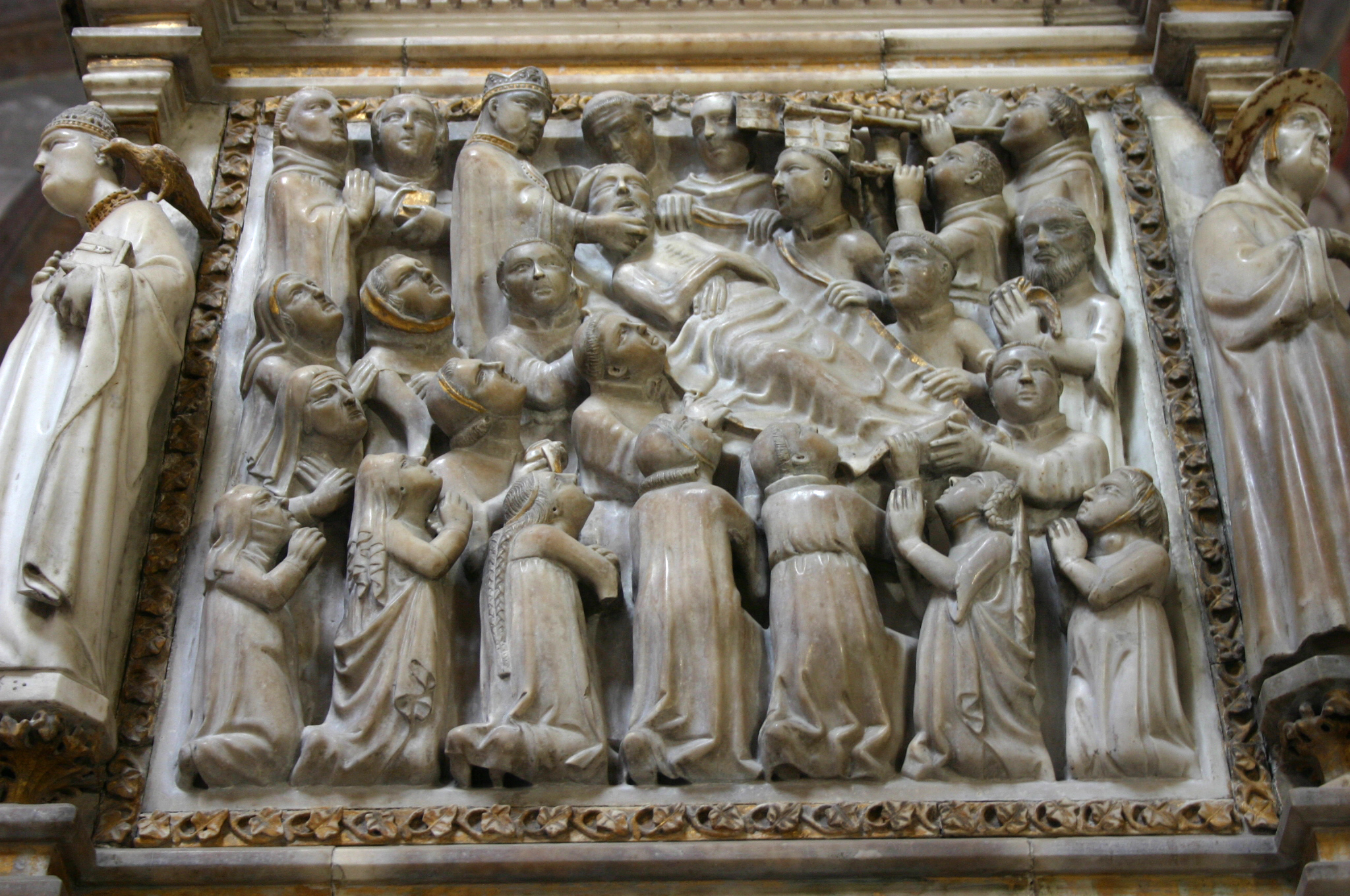
Peter of Verona's body is moved from Basilica of San Simpliciano to Basilica of Sant'Eustorgio.

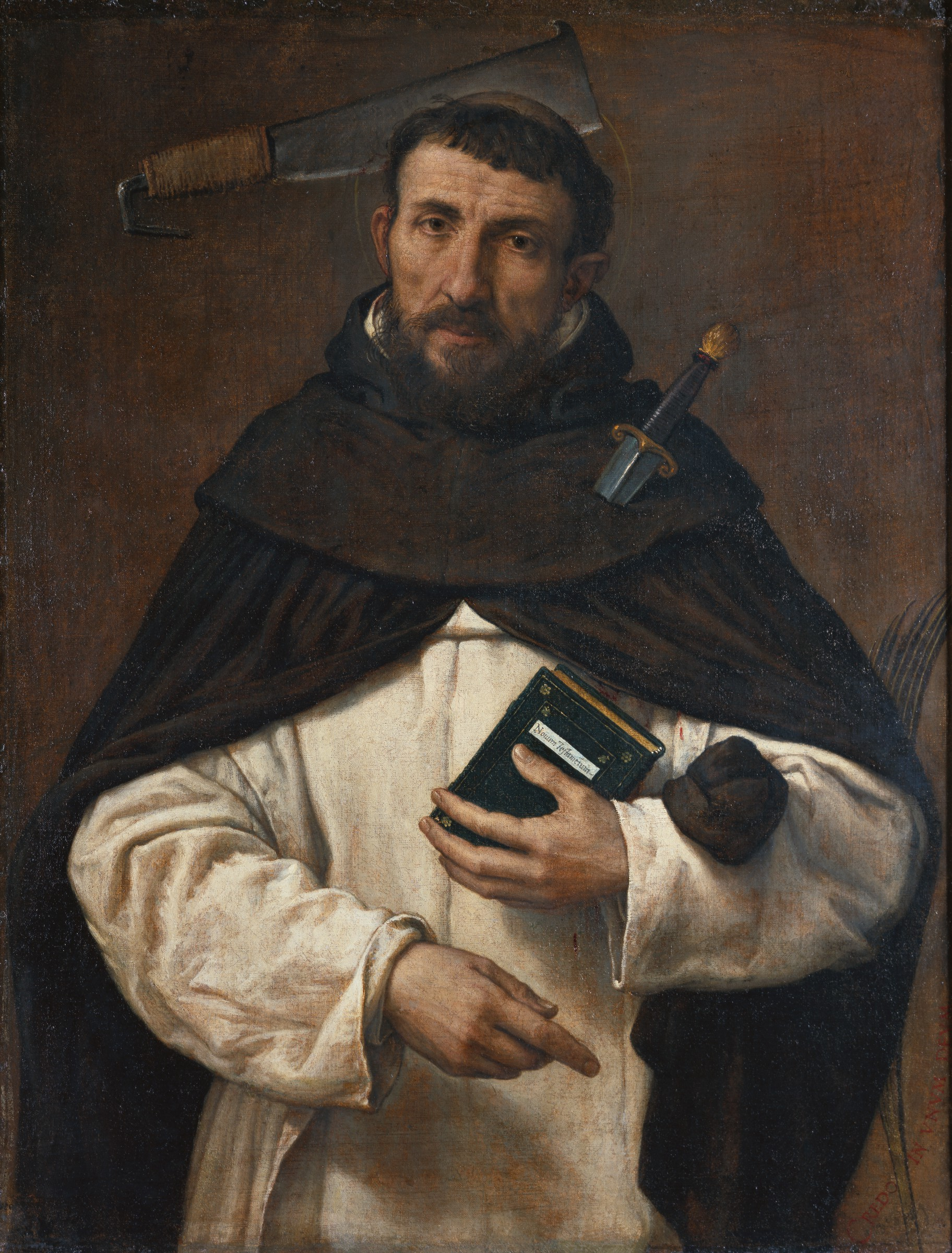
Friar Angelo Ferretti as Saint Peter Martyr, by Lorenzo Lotto

== Sources ==
- Dondaine, Fr. Antoine, O.P. "Saint Pierre Martyr" Archivum Fratrum Praedicatorum 23 (1953): 66-162.
- Prudlo, Donald. The Martyred Inquisitor: The Life and Cult of Peter of Verona (+1252). Aldershot: Ashgate Press, 2008.
- Prudlo, Donald. "The Assassin-Saint: The Life and Cult of Carino of Balsamo", Catholic Historical Review, 94 (2008): 1-21.
