= Church of San Martino (Cinisello Balsamo) =

Church in Lombardy, Italy

- Chiesa di San Martino Vescovo
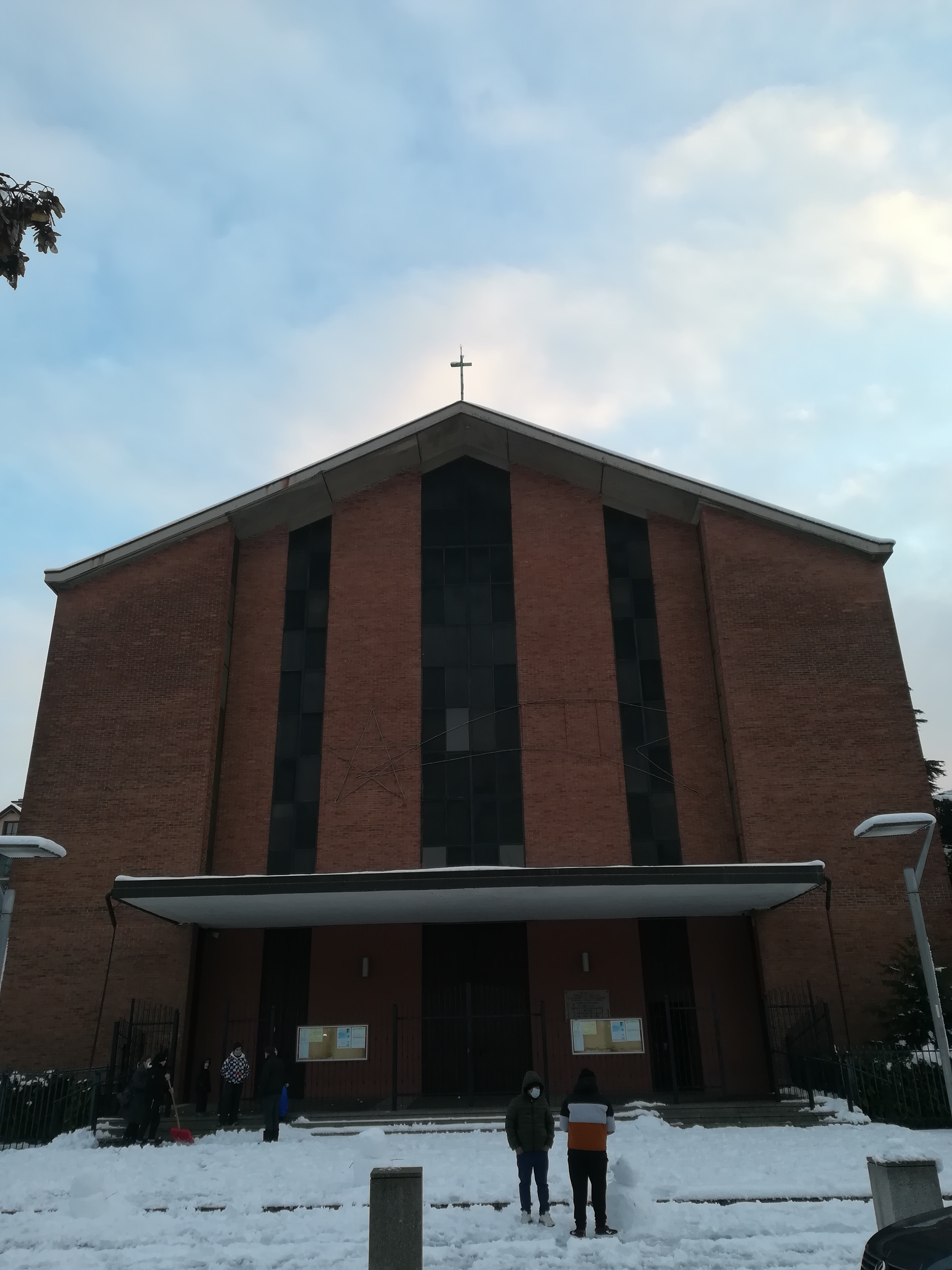
- The facade of the church

- 45.55363°N 9.22377°E
- Location: Cinisello Balsamo, Lombardy, Italy
- Address: Soncino Square
- Denomination: Catholic (Ambrosian Rite)
- Website: https://www.parrocchiasanmartino.it/

History
- Dedication: Martin of Tours
- Consecrated: June 3, 1961

Architecture
- Style: Modern
- Groundbreaking: 1957
- Completed: 1961

Administration
- Archdiocese: Roman Catholic Archdiocese of Milan

The Church of San Martino is a Catholic religious building located in Cinisello Balsamo, in Piazza Soncino, overlooking Villa Casati Stampa. It is the main church in the Balsamo area.

== History ==
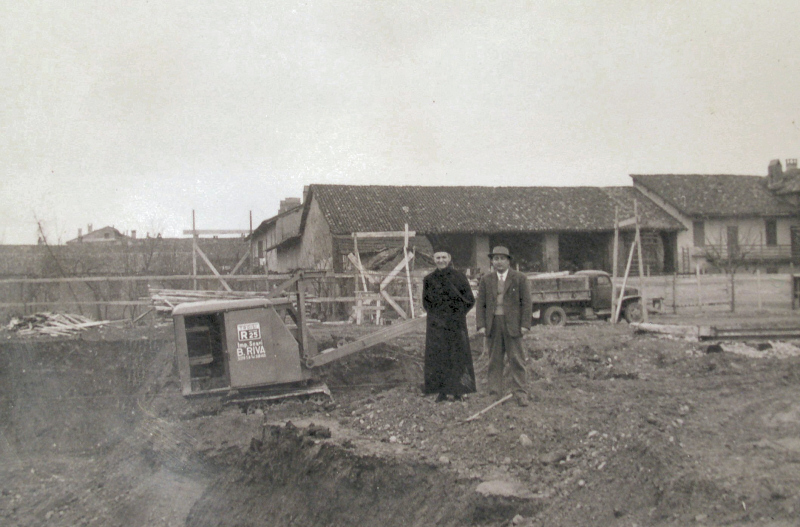
Don Piero Carcano on the foundations of the future church. (1957)

The church was built with the purpose of coping with the city's population growth, which had been brought about by the continuous city building development of the 1950s and the consequent flow of migrants: the old church (Note: In 1978 the old church assumed the definition of sanctuary, when it had already lost its function as a parish church (see Scurati (1987), pp. 189–191). The change of definition was probably intended, with equal dedication to St. Martin of Tours, to make a formal distinction between the two churches, valuing the fact that the relics of St. Saturninus and Blessed Balsamo Abbot were still preserved in the old church of St. Martin.) was no longer suitable, in terms of capacity and functionality, to accommodate the new worshippers. After the initial intention to build a subsidiary chapel, parish priest Don Piero Carcano decided for the building of a new parish church. An initial idea for the location fell on Villa Casati, but it met with opposition from vestrymen and the fear of excessive debt. Therefore, the land in front of it in Piazza Soncino was acquired, at the suggestion of Monsignor Maini, a lawyer for the Archdiocese of Milan. The purpose of the new location was to move the parish to a central area of the city, to bring in new worshippers and remain close to the old ones.

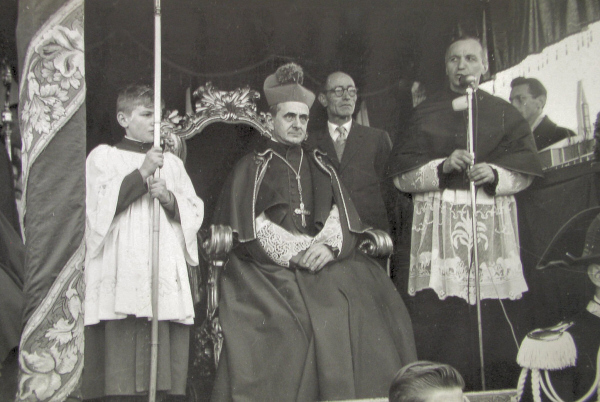
Don Piero Carcano and Archbishop Montini kick off work on the new church. (1957)

A committee was formed to screen the project, which was entrusted to engineer Claudio Latocca and carried out with the collaboration of architects Olgiati and Sartorio.De Carli (1994, p. 141) The work was supported through collections and offerings of gold from the faithful. In addition, the parish proceeded to sell some areas of the land it owned, which it had received as a donation from benefactress Catina Cornelio. On March 3, 1957, Cardinal Giovanni Battista Montini, archbishop of Milan, laid the foundation stone, and work continued until 1961, when it was completed. The initial project also included the construction of a "Parish Works Center," connected to the church through a portico, and a bell tower, both of which were never built. On March 19, 1961, the church was blessed by Monsignor Mario Civelli, a missionary bishop in China of Balsamese origin, who celebrated the first Mass. On the occasion of the celebration of Corpus Christi, the date of the consecration of the church by Cardinal Montini was announced, which was held on June 3, 1961. Subsequently, Don Carcano arranged for the placement of the paintings depicting the Stations of the Cross.

In 1977, with the installation of the new parish priest Fr. Mario Valzasina, changes were made to the interior arrangement of the church: The side altars, to the right and left of the presbyteral area, and the balustrade dividing the presbytery from the hall were removed to bring it in line with the new provisions of the Second Vatican Council; the tabernacle was placed in the center and a white marble staircase was built to access the area where the Eucharist was placed; some processional banners were restored and placed on the walls of the liturgical hall. Valzasina then had a statue of the Risen Christ made by Don Marco Melzi of the Beato Angelico School in Milan. He also had the heating system modernized.

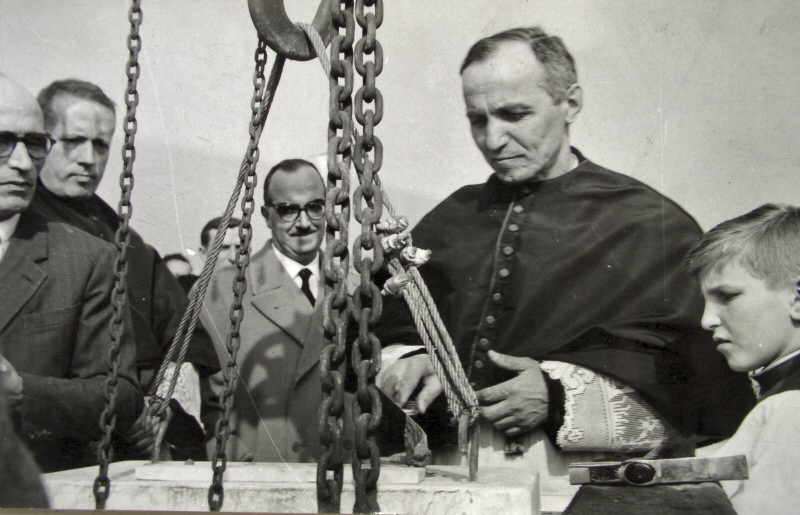
Don Piero Carcano at the foundation stone laying ceremony. (1957)

In 1997 the new parish priest Fr Felice Carnaghi provided for the re-roofing of the church, and the following year he undertook a new renovation of the electrical and lighting systems and of the interior. A false ceiling was made to soundproof the church acoustically, and in the center of the false ceiling, above the altar, was housed the painting with the face of Christ Pantocrator, made in 1999 by Sergio Giannini. With this intervention, the original concrete ogives supporting the roof were hidden.De Carli (1994, p. 141) To complete the liturgical adaptation to the conciliar prescriptions, the baptismal font was placed to the right of the altar, eliminating the ambon. The presidential seat was placed to the right of the new altar, and the statues of the saints and the urn of Blessed Carino were placed in the left aisle. The roofing of the choir seats was redone and a new electric organ was purchased.

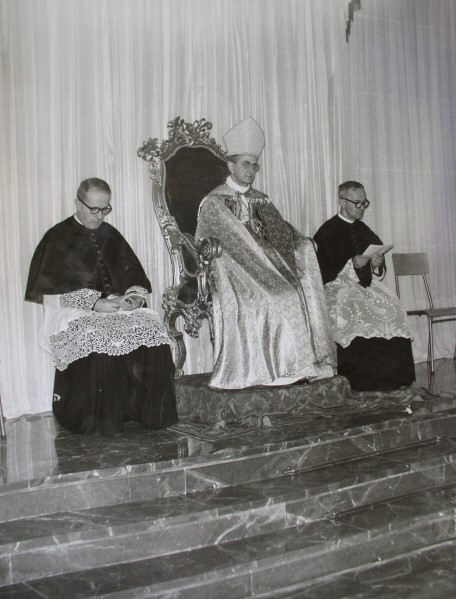
Don Piero Carcano, Archbishop Montini and Don Massimo Pecora at the consecration of the new church of San Martino in Balsamo. (1961)

In 2005, in conjunction with the redevelopment of Soncino Square, which was repaved with porphyry slabs, new paving of the churchyard and the gate closing the pronaos were made. On May 27, 2007, artist Mike Ciafaloni donated to the parish a fresco, called Love, Art and Reason, which was placed on the wall flanking the facade. On December 23, 2010, the parish placed two large vases containing centennial olive trees on either side of the churchyard.

Since 2014 the new parish priest Fr Enrico Marelli has made several interventions regarding the church: new pews, of the same type as the existing ones, have been added to replace those from the old church and no longer in good condition; the sound and heating systems have been redone. Between 2015 and 2016, he commissioned parishioner Magdalena Grandi to paint six paintings depicting the life of St. Martin of Tours, made with the financial contribution of the city's "Pablo Neruda" Cultural Circle. The two paintings with angels praying that were placed at the altar of Our Lady were made by the same painter.

From June 7 to 14, 2015, the parish hosted the statue of the Pilgrim Virgin Mary of Fátima for a week of meetings and prayer. During the event, a bomb scare, later revealed to be false, was triggered and a bomb squad was called in. When the emergency was over, the simulacrum was carried in procession around the city and then was once again kept inside the church for adoration.

On February 1, 2017, the church hosted Archbishop Angelo Scola's pastoral visit to the Cinisello Balsamo deanery.

In 2020, the boiserie of the high altar, which had become deteriorated, was fixed and restored. On Christmas Eve, canvases donated by painter Magdalena Grandi depicting four angels and placed behind the high altar were inaugurated. In 2021, the Beato Angelico School of Milan restored the tabernacle, which was inaugurated during Palm Sunday. In 2022, Piazza Soncino underwent further redevelopment.

== Description ==
The church is oriented from north to south. The building has a compact architecture, characterized by a single imposing block on a reinforced concrete load-bearing structure. It covers an area of 1,300 m^{2} and has a seating capacity of 800 seats and 1,000 standing, to which are added the 200 seats in the crypt.

=== Exterior ===
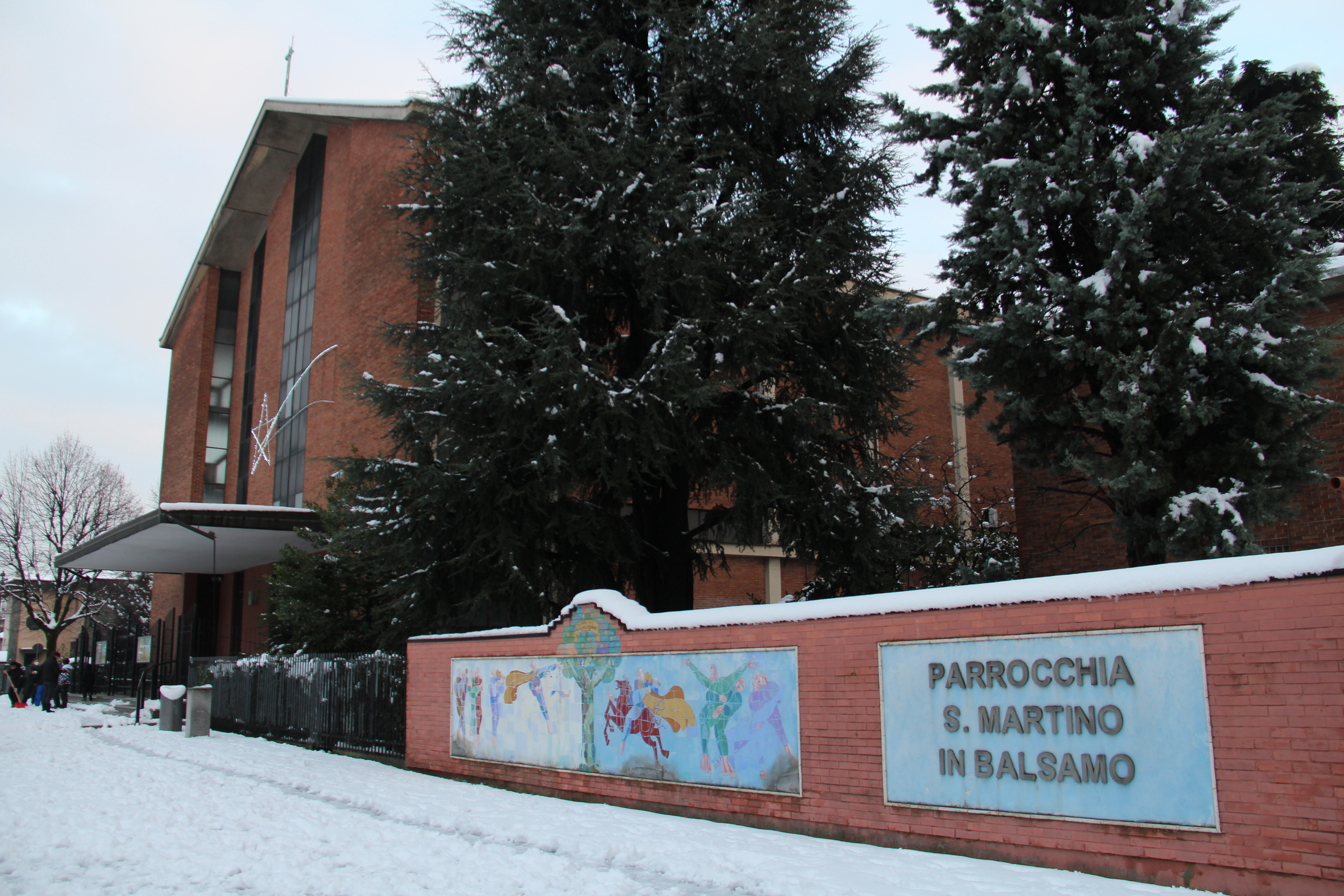
Right side of the exterior, featuring the mural Love, Art and Reason.

The church faces a churchyard raised one step above the square, with a wide three-step flight of steps through which the pronaos is accessed. The side facades feature reinforced concrete prism structural pillars with terracotta cladding,De Carli (1994, p. 141) and ribbon windows running around the entire perimeter of the building. All surfaces are of exposed brick. The main facade is gabled, in the middle part slightly set back and characterized by a pronaos, closed by a gate, defined by a large corbel and surmounted by three large longitudinal windows, at the entrances.De Carli (1994, p. 141)

On the right side of the church is the parish house with offices, while on the left side is a building for parish works; all properties are set in a garden.

On the boundary wall of the parish property facing the churchyard is the fresco Love, Art and Reason, created by Mike Ciafaloni. The work has the inscription "The fruit of love is the salvation of mankind" and depicts Christ nailed to a fruit tree in the center, a symbol of "human generosity toward the less affluent peoples"; also depicted is St. Martin, "who helps the suffering people and finds harmony, well-being and sustainability through human generosity and sacrifice."

=== Interior ===
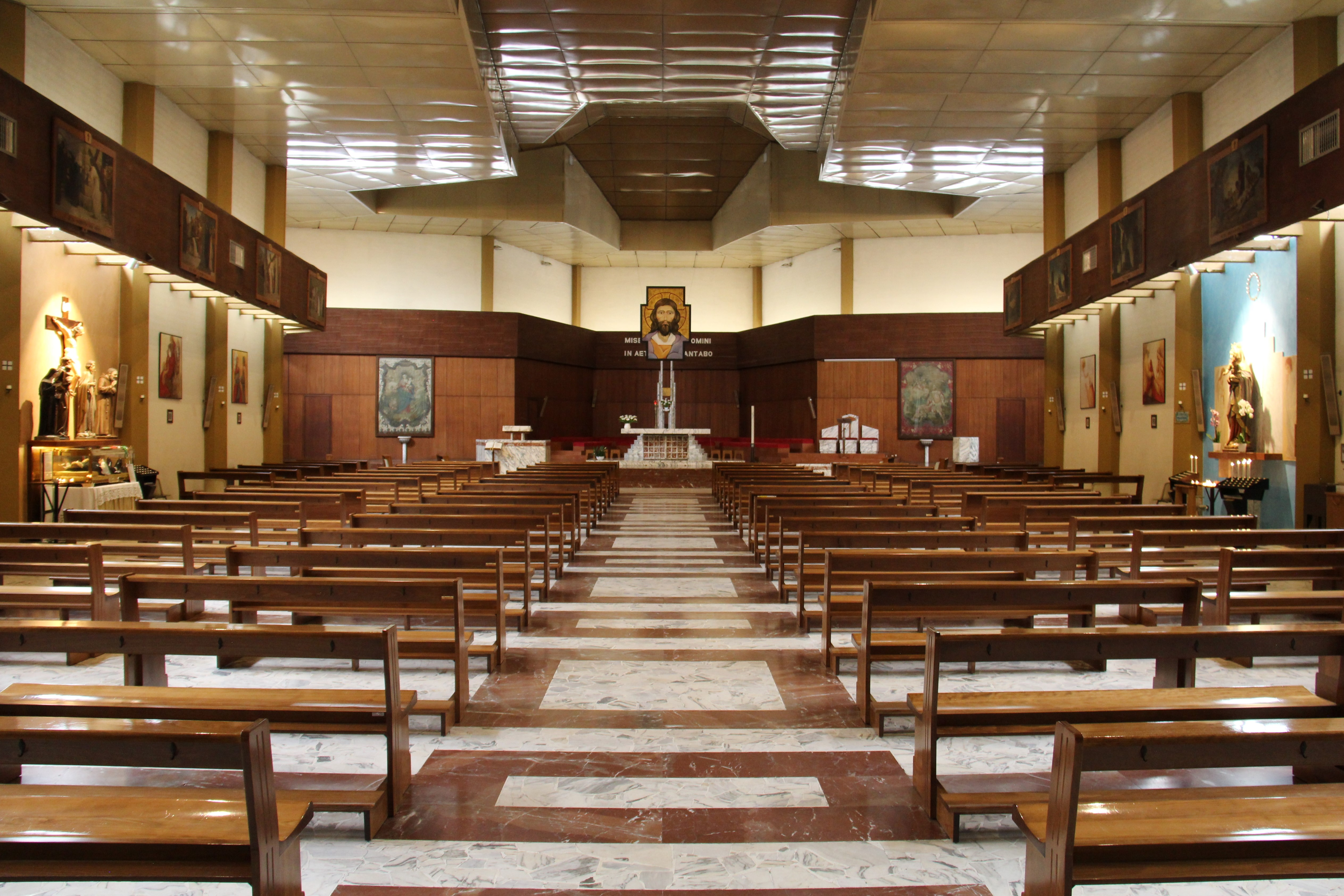
The interior as seen from the back of the church.

The plan of the church is in the shape of a Latin cross with the arms widening in a trapezoid shape toward the center of the transept, where the main altar, made of light marble, is located. It has a single large nave, with plastered and painted masonry and whose floor is made of light Versilia marble with dark red marble squares; this is characterized by the rhythm of reinforced concrete pillars, painted mustard-colored, at the top of which they are connected through trusses. Surrounding the chancel are the sacristy and penitentiary. In the upper part of the masonry is housed a band of wood-effect coated reinforced concrete, which runs around the entire perimeter of the liturgical hall. On this band are paintings depicting the Stations of the Cross, made by the painter Compagnone. Lower down are placed, three on each wall, paintings dedicated to the life of St. Martin of Tours. On the right aisle is a chapel dedicated to Our Lady, while the left aisle houses statues of Saints Rita of Cascia, Anthony of Padua, Joseph and Padre Pio, as well as the urn of Blessed Carino of Balsamo. Above the entrance portal, in the upper part of the counter facade, is housed the sculpture of the Risen Christ. Several banners cover the walls.

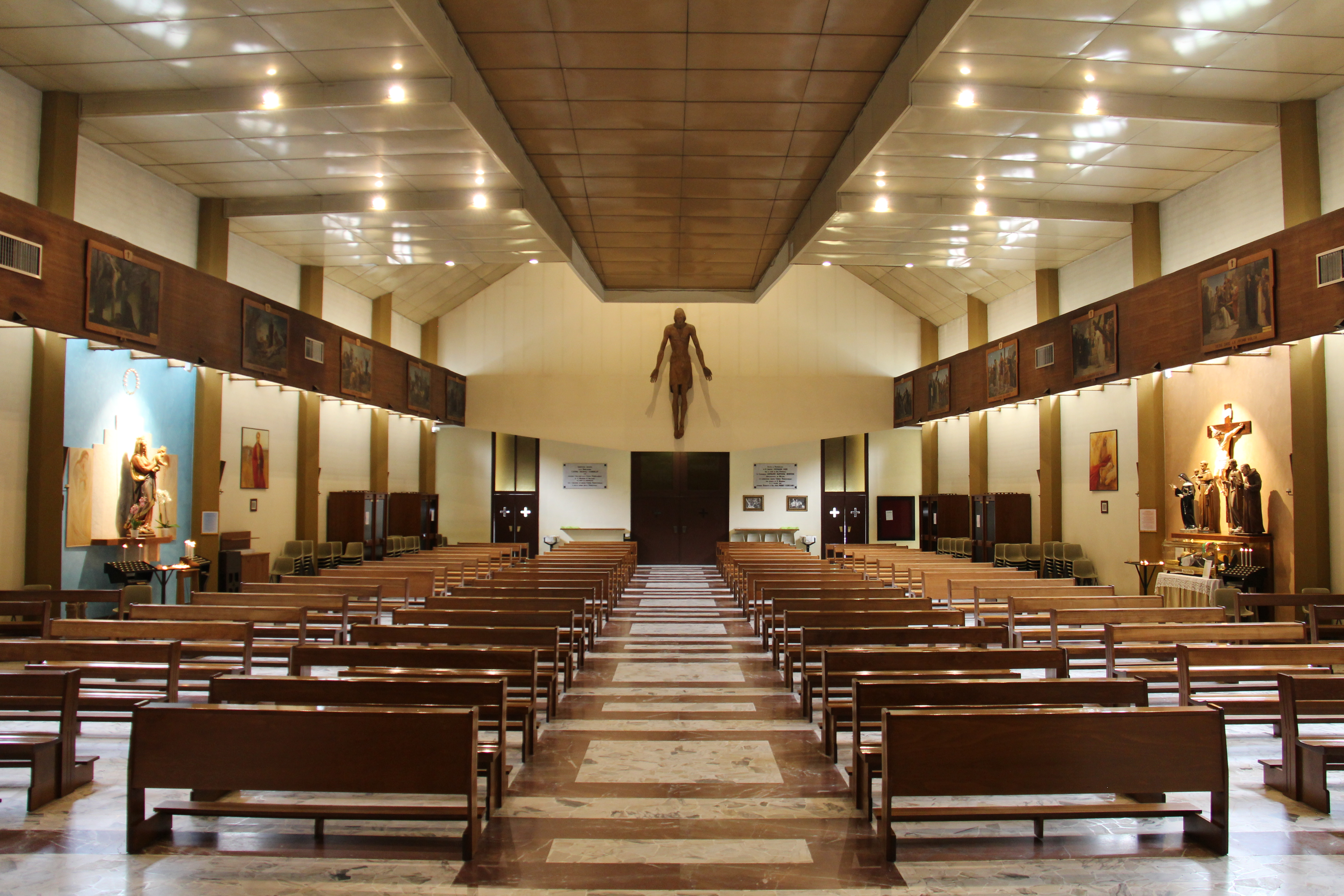
The interior as seen from the front of the altar.

The presbyteral area is situated in an elevated position, connected to the liturgical hall by three steps and defined by the width of the transept. The apsidal bowl is made of wood panels and houses the choir. In the center of the transept is the altar: a table designed on the style of the pavement. The tabernacle placed at the bottom of the transept, in front of the choir, is housed in a linear structure composed of Versilia stone sheets, arranged at the apex of a staircase that places it at the center of the view from every point of the assembly hall. To the right of the altar, the right arm houses the presiding seat, also made of light Versilia stone, and the baptismal font. To the left of the altar, in a more forward position, and at the base of the chancel is the ambon. The liturgical hall is directly connected with the sacristy through a staircase carved near the access staircase to the crypt, at the head of the left arm.

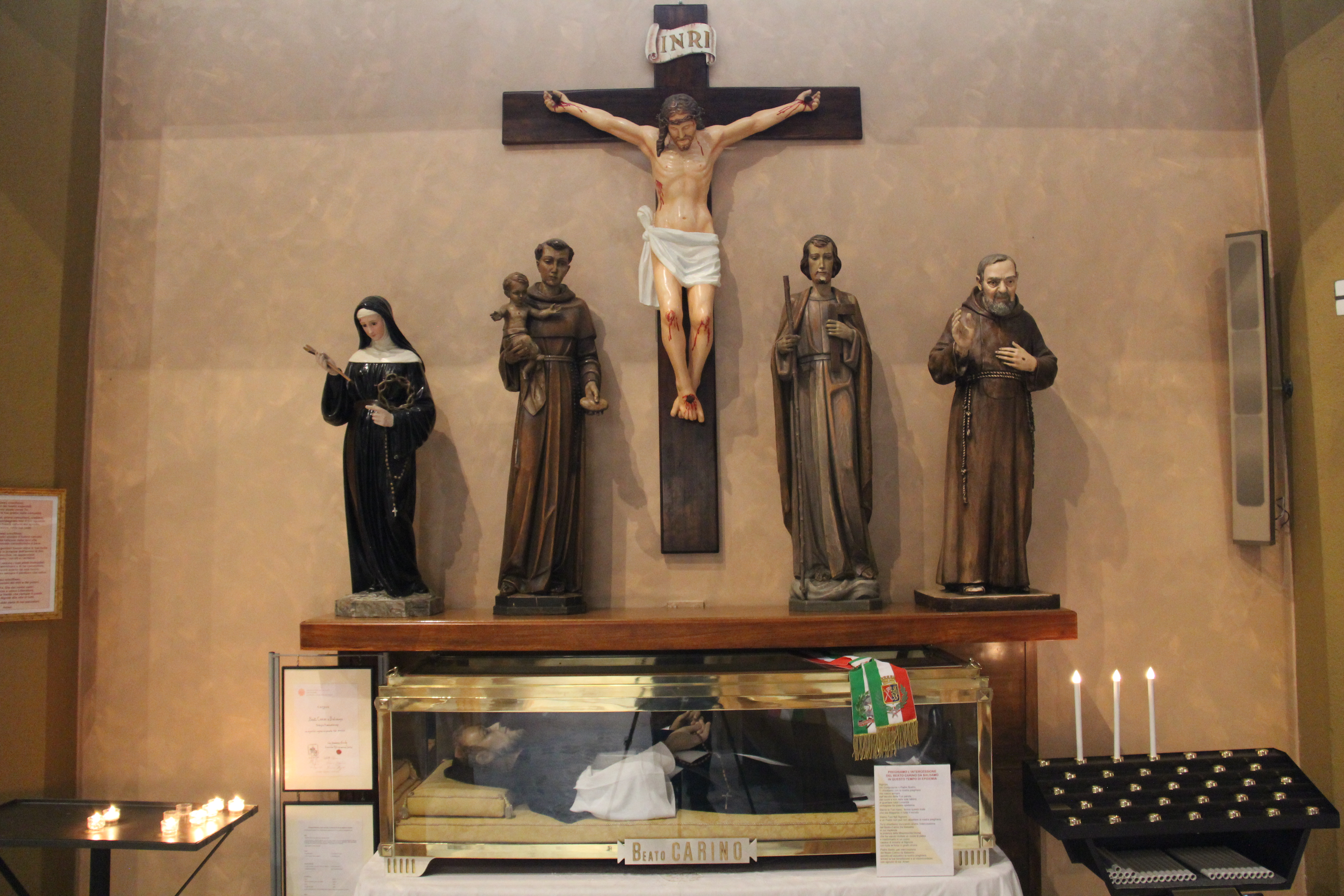
The altar with the statues of the Saints and the urn of Blessed Carino.

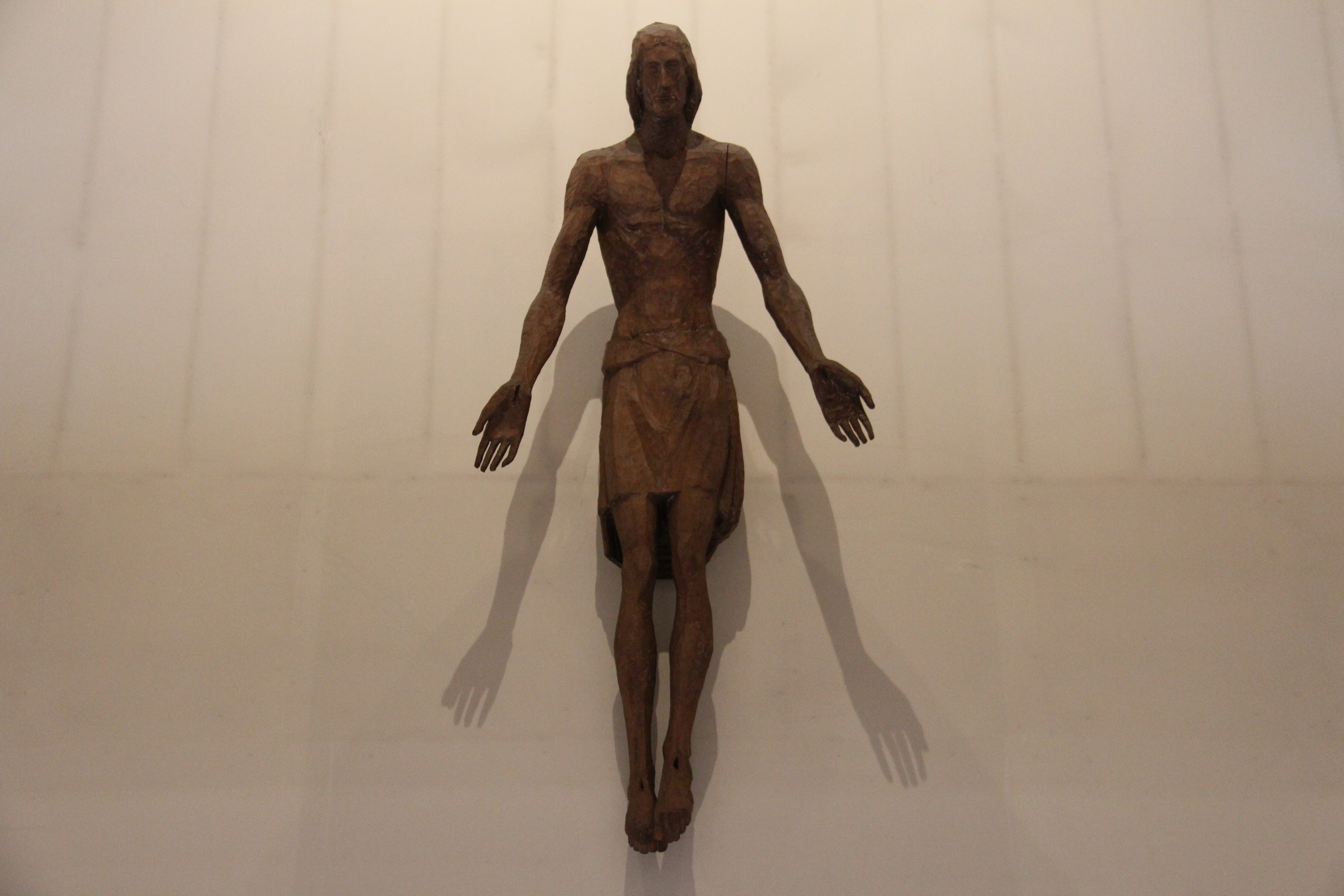
The statue of the Risen Christ housed above the entrance portal.

Four canvases depicting angels symbolizing the virtues of St. Martin have been placed on the central wall, on either side of the tabernacle, and on both sides of the side walls: on the sacristy-side wall is the angel "of prayer," depicted in the gesture of contemplation; on the chancel-side wall is the angel "of charity," depicted with St. Martin's cloak in his hands; on the center wall, to the right of the tabernacle, the angel "of adoration," depicted with the thurible in his hands in the act of incensing; on the center wall, to the left of the tabernacle, the angel "of light," depicted with one hand on his heart and the other holding out a light.

=== Crypt ===
A crypt is located under the chancel and is accessed by two side staircases that start from the ground floor. The flooring is made of light-colored stone flakes and dark red marble bands. The crypt houses a seventh painting from the cycle of the life of St. Martin of Tours, the first in chronological order created by the painter Magdalena Grandi: initially hung along the liturgical hall, it was later replaced by a remake of the same and moved to the lower floor. There are some banners and two paintings, depicting St. Paulinus of Nola and St. Charles Borromeo. Also placed is a plaque commemorating the first placement of Blessed Carino, consecrated by Monsignor Paolo Babini, bishop of Forli.

== Blessed Carino of Balsamo ==
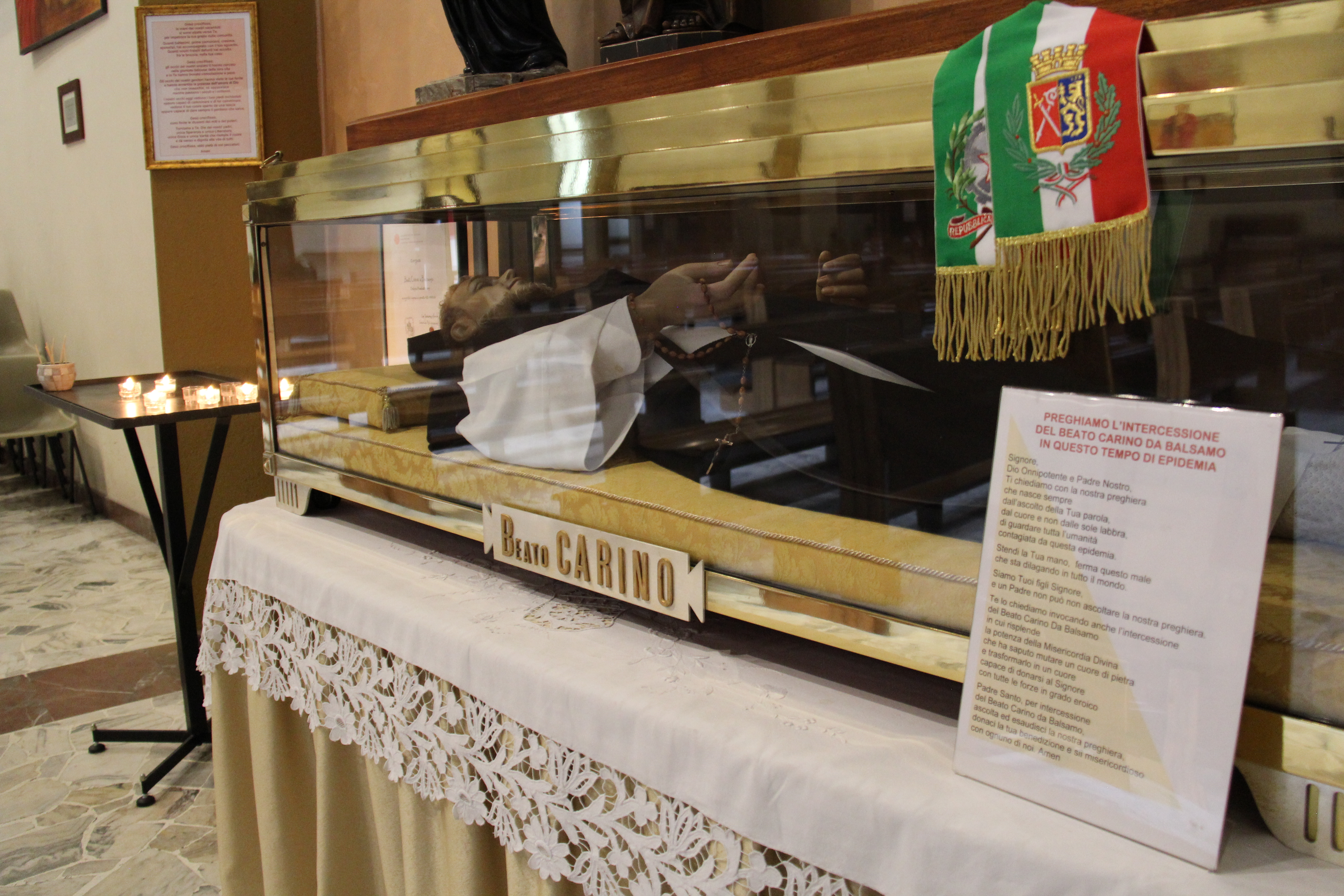
The urn containing the body of Blessed Carino.

The church contains the body of Blessed Carino of Balsamo. Carino's body was kept in Forli Cathedral until November 4, 1964, when at the interest of parish priest Don Carcano it was reassembled in a simulacrum and clothed in the habit of the Dominicans, together with the head and the remaining relics (kept since 1934 in the old church); everything was kept inside a metal and glass urn and placed under the altar of the crypt. In the late 1990s it was moved to the left wall in the center of the nave.

On January 28, 2013, the canonical recognition began by Monsignor Giordano Ronchi, Custodian of the Sacred Relics of the Venerable Archdiocese of Milan, in which the consolidation and cataloguing of the relics of Blessed Carino of Balsamo was carried out. His simulacrum, containing his body in its entirety, was restored and solemnly displayed from May 20 to June 3 of the same year in the altar area. In 2014 it was relocated to its previous location.

== See also ==
- Sanctuary of San Martino
- Carino of Balsamo
- Cinisello Balsamo

== Bibliography ==
- Scurati, Alberto (1975). Storia di Cinisello Balsamo. Cinisello Balsamo: Comune di Cinisello Balsamo.
- Scurati, Alberto (1987). L'enciclopedia di Cinisello Balsamo. Cinisello Balsamo: Comune di Cinisello Balsamo.
- De Carli, Cecilia, ed. (1994). Le nuove chiese della diocesi di Milano: 1945-1993. Milano: Vita e Pensiero.
- Scurati, Alberto (2000). Cinisello Balsamo - Storia di una città. Milano: Accademia Editrice.
- La nostra chiesa – S. Martino in Balsamo, nel 50° della consacrazione. Cinisello Balsamo: Parrocchia San Martino in Balsamo. 2011.
- Bulgarelli, Marco (2015). Il santo assassino. Beato Carino da Balsamo. San Paolo.
