= Crocetta =

Crocetta (Italian for Little Cross) may refer to:

== Places in Italy ==
=== Towns ===
- Crocetta del Montello, a municipality (comune) in the Province of Treviso
- Crocetta, a former municipality in the Province of Rovigo, now a frazione of Badia Polesine

=== Town suburbs ===
- Crocetta (Cinisello Balsamo), a frazione of Milan
- Crocetta, a frazione of Villafranca d'Asti
- Crocetta, a frazione of Montefino
- La Crocetta, a frazione of Toano
- Crocetta, a frazione of Longi
- Crocetta, a frazione of Longiano
- Crocetta, a frazione of Castel Frentano
- Crocetta, a frazione of Medicina
- Crocetta, a frazione of Cinisello Balsamo
- La Crocetta, a frazione of Tronzano Lago Maggiore
- La Crocetta, a district of Turin
- Crocetta, a district (circoscrizione) of Modena

=== Other places in Italy ===
- Crocetta (Milan Metro), a station of Milan Metro
- Colle della Crocetta, a hill in the Graian Alps
- Palazzo della Crocetta, a palace in Florence

== Other uses ==
- Crocetta di Caltanissetta, an Italian dessert

== See also ==
- Crocotta, a mythical dog-wolf
