= Valerio Ruggeri =

Italian actor and voice actor (1934–2015)

- Born: 12 February 1934; Cinisello Balsamo, Italy
- Died: 4 July 2015 (aged 81); Rome, Italy
- Occupations: Actor; voice actor
- Years active: 1957–2015

Valerio Ruggeri (12 February 1934 – 4 July 2015) was an Italian actor and voice actor.

== Biography ==
Born in Cinisello Balsamo, which is located in the city centre of Milan, Ruggeri began his career on stage with Dario Fo and Franca Rame in the early 1960s and worked as a voice actor since the late 1950s. He was best known for dubbing characters mainly in anime and animation, being primarily known for being the Italian voice of Rabbit in the Winnie the Pooh franchise and the second voice of Herbert from Family Guy, replacing Mario Milita who retired in 2012.

In Ruggeri's live action dubbed roles, he voiced Grandpa Joe (portrayed by David Kelly) in the Italian version of the 2005 film Charlie and the Chocolate Factory as well as Nels Oleson (portrayed by Richard Bull) in the Italian version of Little House on the Prairie. He also made cameo appearances in the Italian cinema, appearing in such films as A Quiet Place in the Country and The Leopard.

== Death ==
Ruggeri died of a heart attack on July 4, 2015, at the age of 81. The voices of Herbert and Rabbit were passed on to Angelo Nicotra and Mino Caprio respectively.

== Filmography ==
=== Cinema ===
- The Leopard (1963)
- A Quiet Place in the Country (1968)
- Dirty Weekend (1973)
- The Assassination of Matteotti (1973)
- A Genius, Two Partners and a Dupe (1975)
- Fantozzi (1975)
- Last Touch of Love (1978)
- Lucky and Zorba (1998) - voice

== Dubbing roles ==
=== Animation ===
- Rabbit in The Many Adventures of Winnie the Pooh, Pooh's Grand Adventure: The Search for Christopher Robin, The Tigger Movie, Piglet's Big Movie, Pooh's Heffalump Movie, Winnie the Pooh, The New Adventures of Winnie the Pooh, The Book of Pooh, My Friends Tigger & Pooh
- Herbert (episodes 4x25-26 and seasons 10–12) and Francis Griffin (episode 5x10) in Family Guy, Herbert in The Cleveland Show
- Elder Gutknecht in Corpse Bride
- Sam McKeane in Atlantis: Milo's Return
- Abner in Home on the Range
- Grimsby in The Little Mermaid II: Return to the Sea
- Waldorf in The Muppets, Muppets Most Wanted
- Rudy in Kronk's New Groove
- Bishop in Shrek

=== Live action ===
- Grandpa Joe in Charlie and the Chocolate Factory
- Chief Steward in Herbie Goes Bananas
- Father Time in The Santa Clause 3: The Escape Clause
- Bogrod in Harry Potter and the Deathly Hallows – Part 2
- Nels Oleson in Little House on the Prairie
- Taxi Driver in Delicatessen

=== Video games ===
- Merlin Munroe in Bugs Bunny: Lost in Time
