= Me Romantic Romani =

2014 film

- Directed by: Laura Halilovic
- Screenplay by: Laura Halilovic; Silvia Ranfagni; Valia Santella
- Starring: Claudia Ruza Djordjevic; Marco Bocci; Dijana Pavlović
- Cinematography: Tommaso Borgstrom
- Edited by: Cristina Flamini
- Music by: Santi Pulvirenti
- Release date: 2014
- Language: Italian

Me Romantic Romani (Italian: Io rom romantica) is a 2014 comedy-drama film co-written and directed by Laura Halilovic, in her feature film debut.

A co-production between Italy and Bosnia and Herzegovina, it is loosely based on autobiographical life events of Halilovic. It premiered at the Giffoni Film Festival, and was screened at the Melbourne International Film Festival.

== Cast ==
- Claudia Ruza Djordjevic as Gioia Tracovic
- Marco Bocci as Alessandro
- Dijana Pavlović as Veronica
- Antun Blazevic as Armando
- Simone Coppo as Elvis
- Giuseppe Gandini as Enrico
- Lorenza Indovina as Woman in the Car
- Zema Hamidovic as Grandma
