= Andy Burgess =

Andy Burgess may refer to:

- Andy Burgess (artist) (born 1969), British artist
- Andy Burgess (footballer) (born 1981), English footballer
- Andy Burgess (rugby league) (born 1970), English rugby league player
