= Crocetta (Cinisello Balsamo) =

- Frazione
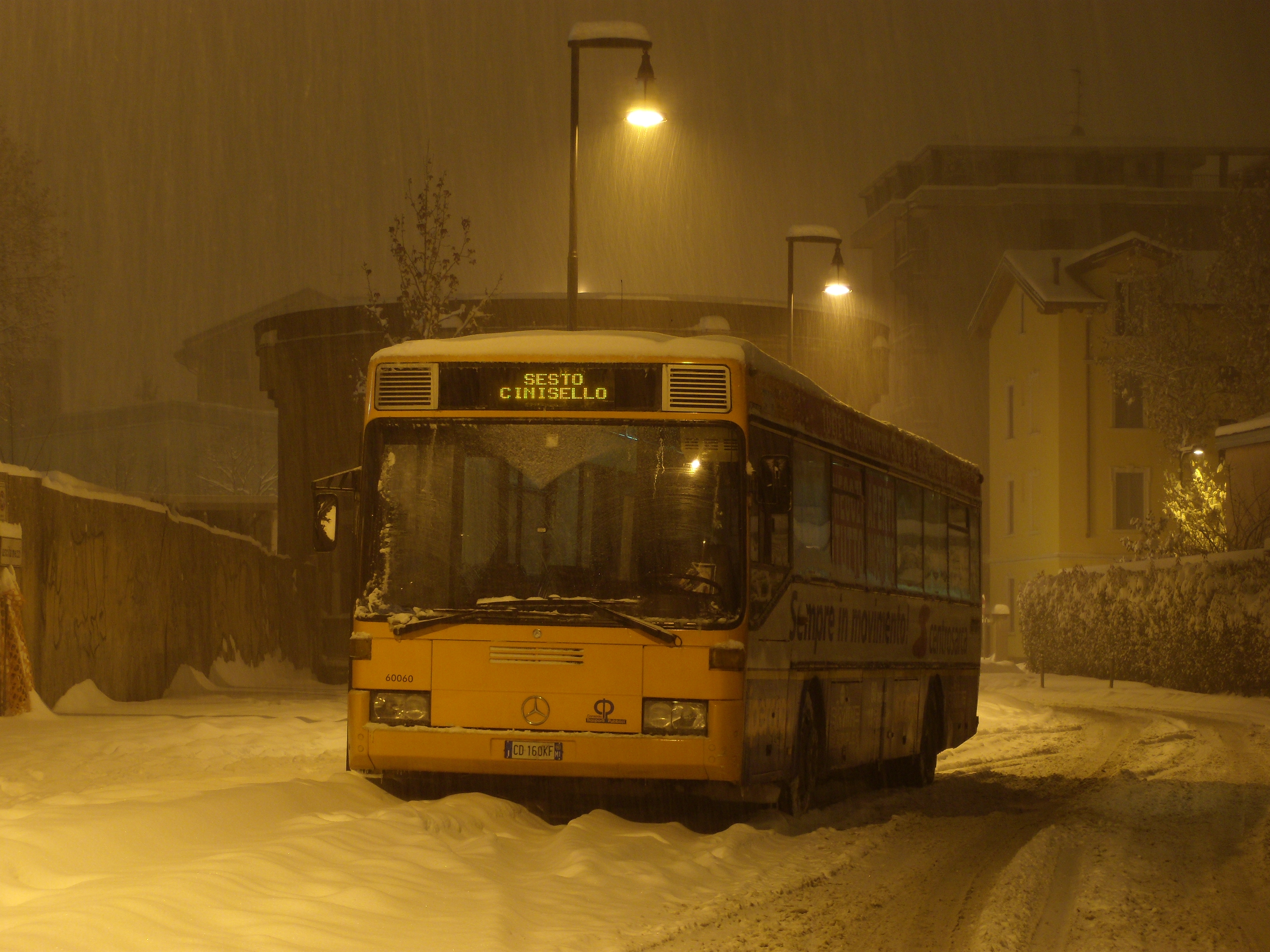

- Location of Crocetta in Italy
- Coordinates: 45°33′N 9°13′E
- Country: Italy
- Region: Lombardy
- Province: Milan (MI)
- Comune: Cinisello Balsamo
- Elevation: 154 m (505 ft)
- Demonym(s): Cinisellesi and Balsamesi
- Time zone: UTC+1 (CET)
  - Summer (DST): UTC+2 (CEST)
- Postal code: 20092
- Dialing code: +39 02
- Patron saint: St. Ambrose
- Saint day: December 7
- Website: Official website

Crocetta is a district in the southern part of the Comune of Cinisello Balsamo, Province of Milan, Lombardy, Italy. The district is bounded by a triangle of roads: the A4 Milan-Venice motorway, the Viale Fulvio Testi (SS36) and the Via Stalingrad. They separate it physically from the rest of Cinisello Balsamo.

The district is occupied by large apartment complexes, built between the 1960s and 1970s, and has an area of 157,890 square meters. Of the 5,000 residents of Crocetta 2,000 are immigrants. The population density of 31,700 inhabitants/km^{2} is six times the Cinisello Balsamo average. The immigrant population makes up 40% of Crocetta's residents.

Dwellings are almost exclusively privately owned. Tenancies have a high rate of turnover due to a steady growth of the immigrant population that has replaced much of the historical inhabitant cohort. The present buildings were designed to accommodate middle class professionals who commuted to Milan for work; there still remains a strong sense of belonging and a desire to improve their environment by families that have decided to stay in the Crocetta district.

== See also ==
- Cinisello Balsamo
- Villa Rachele
- Borgo Misto
- SS36
- Sfera Ebbasta
