= The Hyena of London =

- Directed by: Luigi Mangini
- Screenplay by: Luigi Mangini
- Story by: Luigi Mangini
- Produced by: Giuliano Simonetti
- Starring: Bernard Price; Luciano Pigozzi; Tony Kendall; Diana Martin
- Cinematography: Guglielmo Mancori
- Edited by: John Alen
- Music by: Francesco De Masi
- Production company: Geosfilms
- Distributed by: Geosfilms
- Release date: 23 June 1964 (Italy)
- Running time: 79 minutes
- Country: Italy

The Hyena of London (La jena di Londra) is a 1964 Italian horror film directed by Luigi Mangini, credited as Henry Wilson.

== Plot ==
In 1883 London, a gaunt serial killer named Martin Bauer, known as "The Hyena," is captured and condemned to hang. After his execution, his body disappears from its grave, and a new series of strangulation killings begins in the same area.

Dr. Edward believes Bauer has returned from the grave. His daughter Muriel is in love with Henry Quinn, who her father disapproves of. Edward's alcoholic assistant, Dr. Anthony Finney, is secretly in love with Muriel and frames Quinn for the killings, leading to Quinn's arrest. It is later revealed that the killer is Dr. Edward, who stole Bauer's body and surgically grafted a piece of the killer's brain into his own, transferring Bauer’s compulsions to himself. The doctor is shot dead by police while attempting to strangle Henry Quinn.

== Cast ==
Cast is sourced from Italian Gothic Horror Films, 1957–1968.

- Giotto Tempestini as Dr. Edward Dalton
- Patrizia Del Frae as Muriel
- Luciano Stella as Henry
- Ilona Drasch as Margie, the housekeeper
- Claude Dantes as Elisabeth
- Luciano Pigozzi as Peter, the caretaker
- Giovanni Tomaino as Chris, the butler
- Luigi Rossi as Inspector O'Connor
- Angelo Dessy as Dr. Anthony Finney
- Gino Rumor as Quayle
- Attilio Dottesio as Police Official Brown
- Mario Milita as John Reed

== Production ==
Director Luigi Mangini was predominantly a screenwriter, who claimed to have written over 100 scripts, a figure film historian Roberto Curti describes as "a number that must be drastically toned down." Prior to directing The Hyena of London, he wrote films as early as the mid-1950s with Toto all'inferno. Many of his screenplays were written under the pen name Henry Wilson. He debuted as a director in 1963, co-directing a political documentary on Russia with Piero Ghione. The Hyena of London was shot in the Monti Parioli district of Rome, at Villa Perucchetti.

The film score by Francesco De Masi was taken from Riccardo Freda's film The Ghost and was later reused in The Third Eye.

== Release ==
The Hyena of London was distributed theatrically in Italy by Geosfilms on 23 June 1964. The film grossed a total of 44,000,000 Italian lire in Italy. It was released theatrically in the United States in 1966 by Walter Manley Enterprises. By the late 1980s, San Francisco’s label Loonic Video released a home video version of the film, promoting it as a British production.

== Reception ==
In retrospective reviews, Tim Lucas referred to the film in 1989 as a "forgotten, but fascinating picture from the Italian Golden Age." Curti described the film as obscure in Italy, calling it "one of Italian gothic horror's most schizophrenic oddities." While finding the film somewhat clichéd as a whodunit, he noted Mangini managed to develop a few atmospheric shots. The Classic Horrors Club describes the film as "in some ways, a typical murder mystery [...] familiar, but it's also effective."

Audience reviews are mixed, with one viewer likening it to a "soap opera", and another calling it "the best giallo ever to be set in Bradford".

== Sources ==
- Curti, Roberto (2015). Italian Gothic Horror Films, 1957–1969. McFarland. ISBN 978-1-4766-1989-7.
- Poppi, R; Pecorari, M (1992). Dizionario del Cinema Italiano. Vol. 3. Gremese Editore.
- Lucas, Tim. "Video Tapevine". Video Watchdog. No. 36. p. 20.
- Lucas, Tim (September 1989). "Video Watchdog: Reckless Redneck Reduction". GoreZone. No. 9.
