= Delena Kidd =

English actress (born 1935)

- Born: Delena Violet Kidd; 11 February 1935 (age 91); Newcastle upon Tyne, Northumberland, England, UK
- Education: Royal Central School of Speech and Drama
- Occupations: Stage, film and TV actress
- Spouse: Gary Raymond (m. 1961)
- Children: 3

Delena Kidd (born 11 February 1935) is an English actress who has appeared in numerous British television productions since the late 1950s. In recent years she is perhaps best known for her portrayal of Queen Adelaide in Victoria & Albert.

== Biography ==
Her father was a doctor and her mother the actress Violet Ormonde. She attended Cheltenham Ladies' College, followed by the Central School of Speech and Drama where she won the Sybil Thorndike Prize. She then appeared in repertory theatre in Britain.

== Career ==
Her television appearances include; The Four Just Men, Family Affairs, Time Trumpet, The Sweeney, The Two Mrs. Grenvilles and most recently Holby City in 2013. Her films include Room at the Top.

== Personal life ==
She is married to the actor Gary Raymond. The couple met on a production at the Oxford Playhouse and 56 years later they again appeared on stage together in Oxford at the Burton Taylor Studio.

== Filmography ==
=== Film ===
Year	Title	Role	Notes
1959	Room at the Top	Eva	
2019	In the Trap	Old woman	

=== Television ===
Year	Title	Role	Notes
1955	The Browning Version	Mrs. Gilbert	TV film
1958	ITV Television Playhouse	Sally Rhodes	"A Sense of Justice"
1958	ITV Play of the Week	Sheila Ray / Lady Caroline Dester	"Mary Broome", "The Enchanted April"
1959	The Third Man	Yvonne Chanteau	"Dinner in Paris"
1960	The Four Just Men	Ingrid Brandt	"Crack-Up"
1960	Saturday Playhouse	Lorraine Sheldon	"The Man Who Came to Dinner"
1960	Armchair Mystery Theatre	Kate Lehmann	"The Man with a Feather in His Hat"
1960	BBC Sunday-Night Play	Pat	"The Song of a March Hare"
1960	ITV Play of the Week	Margaret Winsor	"Loyalties"
1960	The Citadel	Toppy Le Roy	"1.5"
1960	No Hiding Place	Gloria	"The Golden Clown"
1961	Danger Man	Franky	"Name, Date and Place"
1961	The Avengers	Vera Korsova	"Girl on the Trapeze"
1961	The Probation Officer	Mrs. Cooper	"2.39"
1961	Echo Four Two	Effie Mead	"First Day Out"
1961	Top Secret	Jacquetta	"After the Fair"
1961	Maigret	Nina	"Shadow Play"
1963	Secret Beneath the Sea	Dr. Ellen Carey	TV series
1963	Friday Night	Paddy Rogers	"The Stop-Out"
1964	No Hiding Place	Janet Nelson	"A Car Is Stolen"
1965	It's Dark Outside	Fleure Pitt	"The Guilty World of Hosea Pitt"
1965	Undermind	Nancy Long	"Puppets of Evil"
1965	The Wednesday Play	Sonia	"The Seven O'clock Crunch"
1965	The Man in Room 17	Pat Hardacre	"Black Anniversary"
1965	Out of the Unknown	Dr. Laura Denville	"Some Lapse of Time"
1965	ITV Play of the Week	Olive Chadwick	"My Father's Keeper"
1966	Public Eye	Liz Lodge	"All the Black Dresses She Wants"
1966	The Spies	Janet	"Full Pay and Funeral Expenses"
1968	ITV Playhouse	Ruth Kinsale	"Murder: Killer's Odds"
1968	Detective	Patricia Leggatt	"The Unquiet Sleep"
1973	Crown Court	Jane Pardoe	"Conduct Prejudicial: Part 3"
1974	Centre Play	Jean	"Sweetheart"
1975	Public Eye	Paula	"Take No for an Answer"
1978	The Sweeney	Mrs. Morris	"One of Your Own"
1978	Les Misérables	Valjean's Sister	TV film
1980–81	Together	Sarah Cunningham	Main role
1981	Maybury	Pat Hardacre	"Weekend"
1987	The Two Mrs. Grenvilles	Tuchy Bainbridge	TV miniseries
1987	Strong Medicine	Flora Stedman	TV film
1991	Minder	Betty	"The Odds Couple"
1994	Scarlett	Lady Morland	TV miniseries
1995	Casualty	Amy Gower	"Lost Boys"
1997	Family Affairs	Elsa Gates	Recurring role
1997	The Moth	Peggy Waters	TV film
2001	Gimmme 6	Music Judge	"London Calling", "Where Is Never, Never Land?"
2001	Victoria & Albert	Queen Adelaide	TV miniseries
2002	Doctors	Judith Gordon	"Cast the First Stone"
2004	New Tricks	Lily	"Home Truths"
2006	Time Trumpet	Various	3 episodes
2011	M.I. High	Hilda	"The Gran Master"
2013	Holby City	Sally Walken	"Time Has Told Me"
2017	Holby City	Joan Compton	"Past Imperfect"
