= Villa Ghirlanda Silva Cipelletti =

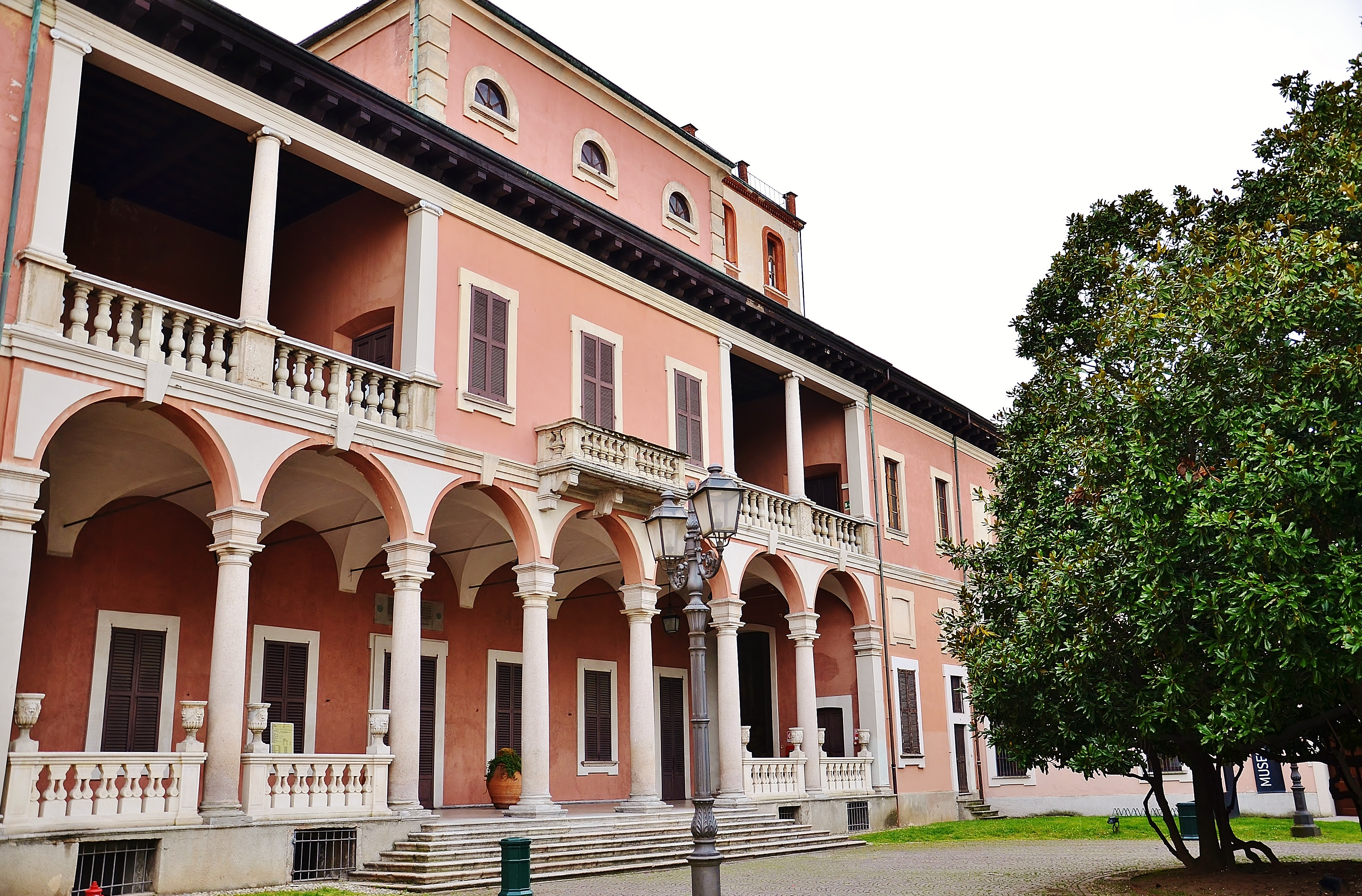
West facade of villa

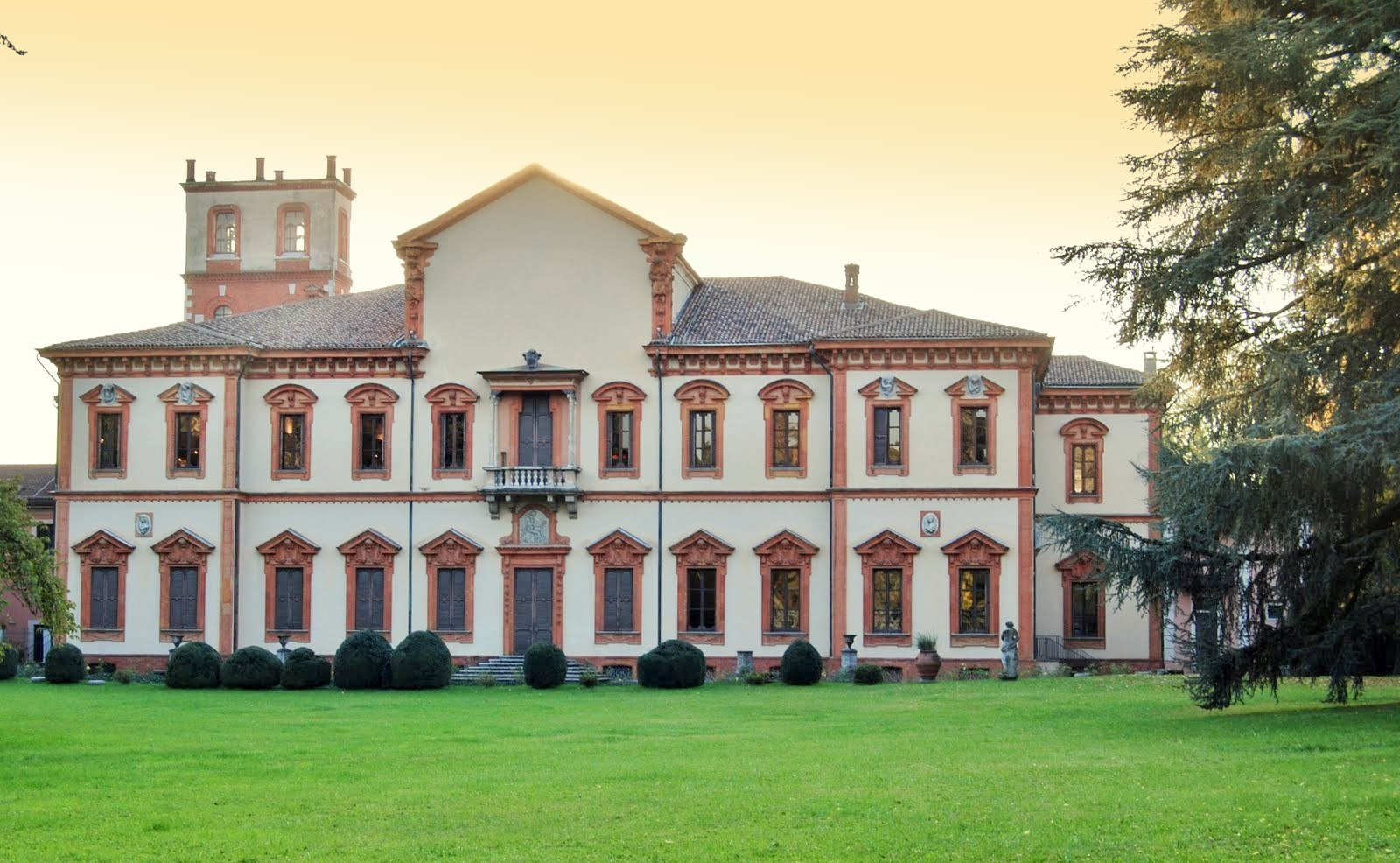
Garden facade of villa

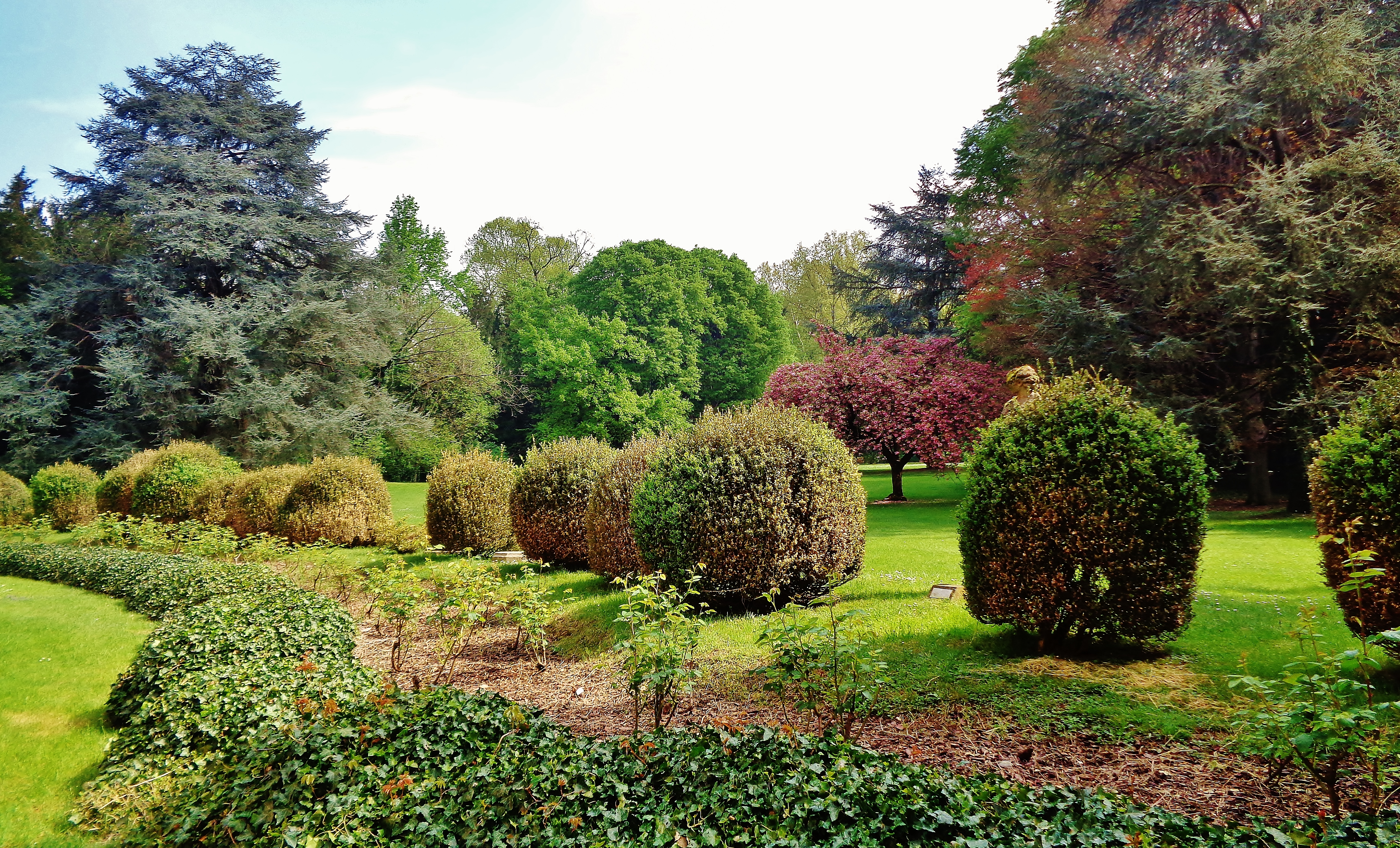
View in the gardens

The Villa Ghirlanda Silva is a 17th-century rural palace and park located in Cinisello Balsamo, just north of Milan, in the Province of Milan, Lombardy, Italy.

== History ==
A residence at the site was originally commissioned by Donato I Silva, Count of Biandrate, from the architect Francesco Maria Richino (died 1658), who was aided by his son Domenico in completion of the project which began circa 1660. An engraving of the building by Marc'Antonio Dal Re (1726) and Karl Remshart (before 1735) document the structure.

Donato Silva (1607–1675) had begun an expansive array of palaces in Rovescala (1656), Cinisello (1660) and Biandrate (1667). In the villa of Cinisello, Donato and later his son Gerardo (1646–1714) had the villa both frescoed and with a prominent picture gallery. Donato I's nephew, Count Donato II Silva (1690–1779) and his great-grandson, Count Ercole Silva (1756–1840) completed the construction and landscaped the surroundings. Ercole, had an interest in natural history and law, and traveled in 1785 to England and France with Archduke Ferdinand. He expanded the villa's collections, and commissioned further decorations from Giuseppe Lavelli and Giuseppe Levati in the Sala dei Paesaggi and the Sala degli Specchi.

After the death of Ercole, the villa passed to his nephew Girolamo Ghirlanda and later to his son Carlo, who also associated Silva with his paternal surname. By 1886 Carlo Ghirlanda Silva sold the villa and the park to Giuseppe Frova. In the 20th century, the property was purchased by Count Giuseppe Cattaneo di Pro, and in 1926, by Emilio Cipelletti. In 1974 Villa Ghirlanda became the property of the municipal administration of Cinisello Balsamo, which started the refurbishment work there to make it the site of some municipal offices and services, to officially open to the public in 1982. Since 2004, the south wing has housed a photography museum. Other portions of the villa are used for ceremonial occasions. Much of the movable collections have been sold or taken elsewhere. The gardens represent a marvelous array of Romantic structures and architectural capricci integrated into the landscape.
