= Scarlett (2018 film) =

- Movie poster
- Directed by: Luigi Boccia
- Written by: Luigi Boccia
- Produced by: Luigi De Filippis
- Starring: Miriam Galanti
- Cinematography: Valerio Evangelista
- Edited by: Luca Borri
- Music by: Rodolfo Matulich
- Release date: 22 November 2018
- Running time: 88 minutes
- Country: Italy
- Language: Italian

Scarlett is a 2018 Italian supernatural thriller film directed by Luigi Boccia.

== Plot ==
A visibly distressed girl named Giulia is being interrogated by two police officers, who ask her to recount everything that happened to her in the preceding hours. Giulia is a young screenwriter with a turbulent past, having suffered psychological abuse from her mother, who went mad after her son's suicide, and is in a toxic relationship with Davide. Giulia explains that she borrowed a car to visit her ex-boyfriend Jack, who had just arrived in Florence from the United States, despite her agent Claudio and her friend Sara advising against it. After driving for a while, she stops at a bar where she encounters her former classmate Anastasia De Curtis, who warns her to "not be afraid of her". The police then reveal that Anastasia had actually died in a car accident the previous year.

In the past, Giulia manages to restart the car after it had stopped working and resumes her journey. However, she begins to develop paranoia as the car seems to drive autonomously, not responding to her controls. Trapped in the car, all her efforts to escape prove futile, and she waits for the fuel to run out. The car, however, heads to a service station, and Giulia, instead of seeking help, complies and asks for a full tank. The gas station attendant makes an advance towards her, and the car reacts by killing him, dragging his body for several kilometers. As the car speeds down the roads, Giulia takes revenge on it by urinating inside and reaching an orgasm. Shortly after, the car stops to pick up two hitchhikers, Scarlett and Roberta. Giulia explains her situation to them, and Scarlett, amused, names the car after herself. Giulia tries to demonstrate the car's autonomy but nearly drives off the road, leading the terrified girls to abandon the vehicle. In response, "Scarlett" runs the girls over, killing them. Finally, the car speaks to an exhausted Giulia, revealing that this will be their last journey together and they will both plunge into a lake. Complying with the car's wishes, Giulia undresses and submerges herself in the water.

In the present, the police inspector does not believe Giulia's story and thinks she is a mentally disturbed murderer. He has her taken away by the officers and then inspects the car, revealing that Anastasia had also died in an identical car with the same nonexistent license plate. Suddenly, "Scarlett" starts up on its own, trapping the inspector inside.

== Cast ==
- Miriam Galanti as Giulia
- Loredana Cannata as Giulia's mother
- Ivan Castiglione as the Police Inspector
- Gianclaudio Caretta as Deputy Inspector Luca Venneri
- Tetyana Veryovkina as Scarlett
- Caterina Milicchio as Roberta
- Angela Pepi as Sara
- Diego Guerra as the gas station man
- Viktorie Ignoto as the waitress
- Anastasia Di Vita as Anastasia De Curtis
- Adriano Sconocchia as the mechanic
- Beatrice Mazzuti as young Giulia
- Gilles Rocca as Claudio (voice only)
- Sergio Valastro as "Scarlett" (voice only)

== Release ==
The film premiered at Rome Independent Film Festival on 22 November 2018. It was released on Prime Video on 1 February 2022.
