= Ernest Hare =

English actor (1900–1981)

Ernest Dudley Hare (5 December 1900 – 1981) was an English stage and film actor.

== Filmography ==
=== Film ===
Year	Title	Role	Notes
1944	Henry V	A Priest	
1949	The Forbidden Street	Policeman	Uncredited
1955	The Quatermass Xperiment	Crash Site Fire Chief	Uncredited
1970	All the Way Up	Vicar	
1978	International Velvet	Presentation Official	

=== Television ===
Year	Title	Role	Notes
1961	Rob Roy	Duke of Montrose	2 episodes
1961	A for Andromeda	Minister of Science	3 episodes
1976	The Duchess of Duke Street	Admiral Swain	2 episodes
1980	Together	Derek Harding	6 episodes
