= John Burgess (actor) =

English actor (1933–2010)

John Herman Louis Burgess (2 February 1933 – 15 November 2010) was an English actor, best known as David Crosbie in Channel 4's long-running soap opera, Brookside, between 1992 and 1998. He also appeared in EastEnders as Donna Ludlow's adoptive father, Gerald, for a few episodes in 1988 and 1989.

== Early life ==
Burgess was born John Herman Louis Bogush in Hampstead, north west London, the son of Edith Ferst and Bertram Bogush. He had two younger siblings, Michael and Wendy. His paternal grandfather, Morris, who arrived in the UK from Poland at the turn of the 20th century, became a successful travelling jeweller. His maternal grandparents were Hungarian. Burgess was born Jewish but had no faith. He changed his name from Bogush to Burgess after becoming an actor, later explaining that "The principal of RADA tactfully suggested that a rather more English sounding name might be more suitable for the 'anyone for tennis' brand of plays then popular on the British repertory circuit."

Burgess was educated at St. Paul's School in west London. Having completed his National Service in Germany, reaching the rank of officer, Burgess graduated from RADA in 1954, where Joan Collins had been a classmate. He spent a few years cutting his teeth in repertory theatre, including a four-year stint at the Elizabethan Theatre Company. However, disillusioned with life as an actor, Burgess left the profession and set up a menswear company. He and his partner ran it successfully for a decade or so but, by 1969, unhappy with his conventional life, he emigrated to Canada, leaving his wife Lana and three children behind him. Following the successful completion of an English and drama degree at Queen's University in Ontario, Burgess returned to the UK.

Upon coming back to the UK, Burgess had to start from scratch. He initially lived with his brother Michael and his wife in Watford, where he worked in a meat factory. Moving closer to central London, he lived in a Belsize Park bedsit and worked as a uniformed chauffeur.

== Stage career ==
Burgess resumed his career in weekly rep at Folkestone, where he ran into his old actor friend, Harry Landis, who was, at that time, artistic director of the Marlowe Theatre in Canterbury. Burgess joined Landis for a season there and subsequently went on tour in a production of The Tempest with the Oxford Playhouse Company. He then began a long and fruitful association with the Royal Shakespeare Company, for whom he appeared throughout the 1970s and 1980s. In both The Witch of Edmonton, in which he played Old Banks, and Richard II, as John of Gaunt, he was directed by Barry Kyle. Under Terry Hands' directorship, Burgess played Sicinius Velutus in Coriolanus, which toured Europe to great acclaim. He also played Reignier in Henry VI Part I, Simpcox in Henry VI Part II and Roman in Children of The Sun, all for Hands.

Under Trevor Nunn's stewardship, Burgess played Lodovico and The Duke of Venice in the much lauded 1989 production of Othello, which was made into a film. For Nunn, he also performed the roles of Scroop in Henry IV, Parts I and II, Duke Frederick in As You Like It and Syringe and Sir John Friendly in The Relapse. Burgess was directed by Ron Daniels in The Lorenzaccio Story, in which he played a goldsmith, The Women Pirates – Ann Bonney and Mary Read, in which he appeared as Forbes, and A Midsummer Night's Dream, in which he performed the role of Egeus. He also played Vesey in Bill Alexander's production of Money and Pistol for Daniels, and again appeared in Henry IV, Parts I and II. In 1978, Burgess played Vlok in David Edgar's play The Jail Diary of Albie Sachs at the Warehouse Theatre in London. The latter play concerned the treatment of the dissident white lawyer Albie Sachs by the apartheid regime in South Africa.

== Screen career ==
Over a period of more than 30 years, from the mid-1970s onwards, Burgess could be seen regularly on British television. He appeared in many established shows, from Midsomer Murders, Lovejoy, The Ruth Rendell Mysteries and Van der Valk to Grange Hill, EastEnders, Holby City, The Bill and Harry Enfield. Amongst the drama serials and soap operas, there were also two films: Rosencrantz and Guildenstern Are Dead and Give My Regards to Broad Street, in which Burgess played Paul McCartney's chauffeur. Burgess also featured in a number of television movies, including The Dybbuk, Love's Labour's Lost and Murders Amongst Us: The Simon Wiesenthal Story. Terry Hands' Coriolanus was also filmed and shown on the small screen.

Burgess appeared in an iconic 1983 British Airways advertisement, in which the Manhattan Skyline floats across the screen. In the early 1990s, he played the equivalent of the "Q" character in the James Bond films in one of a series of popular Barclaycard adverts in which Rowan Atkinson starred. The television role for which Burgess became best known was that of David Crosbie in Channel 4's long-running soap opera Brookside. He spent six years on the show, from 1992 to 1998, and received many plaudits for his performance. He also appeared in the BBC 1 sitcom My Family in 2007, in the episode where the family all appear on The Weakest Link - he had also previously appeared in the My Family 2005 Christmas episode And I'll Cry if I Want To.

== Later career ==
In 2000, after almost a decade away from the theatre, Burgess returned to tread the boards again, and featured in Di Trevis's production of Death of a Salesman at the Birmingham Repertory Theatre. Thereafter, he was invited by Trevor Nunn, the then artistic director of the National Theatre, to join the company. At the National, Burgess played The Marqis de Norpois in Proust's Remembrance of Things Past. Trevis again directed and collaborated with Harold Pinter in adapting his screenplay for the stage. For the National, Burgess also appeared in Humble Boy, The Alchemist, Luther, The Relapse, Romeo and Juliet and, notably, in Mike Leigh's much lauded Two Thousand Years.

== Activism ==
Burgess was a lifelong socialist and passionate about actors' rights, serving on the Equity council. He ran the successful campaign for his friend Harry Landis to become president of Equity. In 2002, he played an active role in preventing an "attempted coup" by a group of right wing actors who believed that "had been politicised by Labour members, to the disadvantage of ordinary performers." Burgess also gave his time to the Unity Theatre Trust, an organisation which took over the work of the left-wing Unity Theatre.

== Personal life, illness and death ==
Burgess was married four times. With his first wife, Lana Cyzer, whom he married in 1959, he had three sons, one of which is Andrew. The marriage ended in divorce.

Burgess married Sylvia Findlay, who stayed on in Canada when he moved back to the UK. This marriage also ended in divorce.

Burgess' third marriage was to actress Vivienne Martin, in 1976.

In September 1996, Burgess announced his fourth marriage, to Dorothy Macaulay, who worked in the hotel industry. Their wedding was attended by members of the Brookside cast and covered by Hello! magazine.

In later life Burgess was diagnosed with pancreatic cancer and he died from the disease, aged 77, two and a half years after diagnosis, on 15 November 2010.

== Partial filmography ==
- The Bitch (1979) as Jeweller (uncredited)
- The Dybbuk (Between Two Worlds) (1980) as Michael
- Together (TV – 1980–81) as Duggie Webber
- The Tragedy of Coriolanus (TV – 1984) as Sicinius
- Sakharov (TV – 1984)
- Give My Regards to Broad Street (1984) as Chauffeur
- Love's Labour's Lost (TV – 1985) as Sir Nathaniel
- Murderers Among Us: The Simon Wiesenthal Story (TV – 1989)
- Miss Firecracker (1989) as William
- Rosencrantz & Guildenstern Are Dead (1990) as Ambassador from England
- The Jazz Detective (TV – 1992) as Dr. Hunter
- Brookside (TV – 1992–1998) as David "Bing" Crosbie
- Catherine the Great (TV – 2005) as Voice of Narrator
- My Family (2005-2007) as Toy Boy, Brad
