= Shortcut (2020 film) =

2020 horror film by Alessio Liguori

- Directed by: Alessio Liguori
- Screenplay by: Daniele Cosci
- Produced by: Simona Ferri
- Starring: Jack Kane; Zanda Emlano; Zak Sutcliffe; Sophie Jane Oliver; Molly Dew
- Cinematography: Luca Santagostino
- Edited by: Jacopo Reale
- Distributed by: Minerva Pictures International
- Release date: August 19, 2020 (Giffoni Film Festival)
- Running time: 80 minutes
- Country: Italy
- Language: English
- Box office: $769,562

Shortcut is a 2020 English-language Italian horror film directed by Alessio Liguori.

The film premiered at the 2020 Giffoni Film Festival and was released in the United States on 25 September 2020 by Gravitas Ventures.

== Plot ==
A boy in a yellow jacket appears injured as he runs for his life through the woods before falling to his knees and breaking down in despair.

Five teens – Nolan, Bess, Reggie, Queenie and Karl – are going on a field trip with their bus driver Joseph. Karl teases Queenie, while it appears that Nolan likes Bess, and Reggie just sits in the back scowling. Joseph gives the teens a riddle to solve to pass the time, involving seven letters and being a much-needed virtue. On the road, a fallen tree blocks their path, so Joseph decides to take a different route.

Further up, Joseph has to exit the bus to move a dead deer from the road. When he returns, he is held at gunpoint by escaped convict Pedro Minghella, whom Karl recognizes from the news. Pedro hijacks the bus and demands everyone follow his orders. He also forces them to throw their phones out of the bus so that there is no way that they can call for help.

Joseph drives the bus later into the evening until they enter a tunnel where the bus inexplicably breaks down. Pedro forces Joseph to attempt to fix it by holding Queenie hostage. The lights in the tunnel suddenly go out, leaving everything in pitch black darkness, save for the bus headlights illuminating an odd shape in the road which Pedro forces Joseph to inspect. Once he gets close enough, the thing reveals itself to be a monstrous creature that rises and kills Joseph, to the horror of the teens. To make matters worse, he had the keys on him. Pedro chooses Karl to go and retrieve them but Nolan insists he go. Bess suddenly exits the bus to go out and retrieve the keys. She succeeds and makes it back to the bus safely where Pedro forces Reggie to try and start the bus with a gun to his head but it will not budge and after a struggle Pedro goes outside to try and kill the beast, only for it to sneak up on him and rip his head off. The monster (which looks like a giant bug with sharp teeth and long hair) rips out the wiring on the bus and hops on board, but the teens manage to escape.

The remaining teens get far enough away but still do not have an exit. They realize the creature is sensitive to light, so they must find a way to turn the lights back on in the tunnel. Nolan and Bess go off to find the main generator while the other three stay together. Nolan comes across some evidence that someone else knew about the creature and had tried to kill it. He and Bess find pictures and journals, as well as countless drawings of someone obsessed with killing it. Meanwhile, Queenie asks Reggie to escort her to pee, but when he has his back turned, the creature grabs Queenie. Reggie gets Karl to help, and they find the creature biting into Queenie's neck. They fight it off with torches and rescue her before the wound becomes fatal. The creature then captures Reggie and nearly kills him until Nolan and Bess manage to turn the lights on, scaring the creature away.

After Nolan and Bess catch up with Reggie, Karl, and Queenie, they show the three all the evidence they found. It belonged to a man named Giulio Sarpi, who, in 1971, lost his younger sister Isabella to the monster (he was the boy seen in the film's opening). Giulio spent 40 years studying the creature and learning how to defeat it only to end up killed by it instead. His corpse is found by the teens in a corner. They decide it is time they kill it themselves.

They devise a plan and find a way to lure the creature toward them. Bess and Queenie get the creature to chase them until they find the exit to outside, where it is now daytime. The creature stops and is trapped when the boys come running up to it with torches. With nowhere to run, the creature is lit on fire. It writhes and screeches in agony until it finally collapses, apparently dead.

The teens walk together into town to get help. Sometime later, they are seen hanging out, closer than ever. Their voiceover narration reveals that they solved the answer to Joseph's riddle – it was courage, which is what it took for them to work together and escape.

Authorities later come by the tunnel to investigate the teens' story. One detective goes in with a flashlight, only for the light to suddenly go out. He hears the rattling noise from the creature, who then appears behind the detective as the screen fades to black.

== Cast ==
- Jack Kane as Nolan
- Zanda Emlano as Karl
- Zak Sutcliffe as Reggie
- Sophie Jane Oliver as Bess
- Molly Dew as Queenie
- David Keyes as Pedro Minghella
- Terence Anderson as Joseph
- Andrei Claude as Chris
- Mino Caprio as Giulio Sarpi
- Teo Achille Caprio as young Giulio Sarpi
- Emma Giua as Isabelle Sarpi
- Matteo De Gregori as the Night Wanderer

== Release ==
Shortcut premiered on 19 August 2020 at the Giffoni Film Festival. It was released on 25 September 2020 by Gravitas Ventures across the United States at indoor theaters and drive-ins.

== Reception ==
Shortcut had a mixed reception from critics. The film holds a 59% approval rating on Rotten Tomatoes, based on 27 reviews with an average rating of 5.2/10. The site's consensus reads, "This road trip horror outing may take one Shortcut too many to count as a truly satisfying journey, but refreshing brevity and a show-don't-tell approach smooth the ride."

Kelli Marchman for HorrorFuel.com wrote, "All in all, Shortcut was a good flick that will keep you on your toes. It's got a good story, a fantastic filming location, plenty of action, and a lot of blood. I'm giving it a 4 out of 5." Courtney Howard for Variety wrote, "If only someone had course-corrected the filmmakers on their own route to making this letdown of a horror road-movie, which gets off to a good start before losing its way."
