= Arianna (film) =

- Directed by: Carlo Lavagna
- Written by: Carlo Lavagna; Carlo Salsa; Chiara Barzini
- Produced by: Carlo Lavagna; Tommaso Bertani; Ginevra Elkann
- Starring: Ondina Quadri; Massimo Popolizio
- Cinematography: Hélène Louvart
- Music by: Emanuele de Raymondi
- Release date: September 4, 2015 (Venice Film Festival)
- Running time: 84 minutes
- Country: Italy
- Language: Italian

Arianna is a 2015 independent coming-of-age drama film written and directed by Carlo Lavagna. It was entered into the competition at the Venice Days section at the 72nd Venice International Film Festival, and was awarded for Best Italian Discover and Best New Actress and won the best actress award at the Italian Golden Globes (Ondina Quadri).

For this film Lavagna was nominated for David di Donatello for Best New Director.

== Plot ==
Now considered a woman, Arianna (Ondina Quadri) has a social life and an academic life. There remains one thing missing from her life as a woman: her period. Constantly scrutinizing her sexual development, or lack thereof, is a daily task until the summertime when she meets Martino (Eduardo Valdarini). The summer spent at the lake with her family is used as a time for shenanigans with friends and delving deeper into the study of her body's sexuality, psychological state, and genitalia.

== Cast ==
- Ondina Quadri as Arianna
- Massimo Popolizio as Marcello
- Valentina Carnelutti as Adele
- Corrado Sassi as Arduino
- Blu Yoshimi as Celeste
- Eduardo Valdarnini as Martino
- Lidia Vitale as the gynecologist
- Tommaso Cortesi as Piero
- Paola Cecchetti as the psychologist
- Vittoria Bonifati as psychodrama girl
- Gaia Fredella as psychodrama girl
- Chiara Ingrati as psychodrama girl
- Elena Rossi as psychodrama girl
- Miriam Galanti as psychodrama girl
- Lorena Stamo as psychodrama girl
- Silvia Stancanelli as psychodrama girl
- Azzurra Tassa as psychodrama girl
- Nello Palombini as Nello
- Marcello de Archangelis as the radiologist
- Francesco Linguiti as Dr. Linguiti
- Chiara Livia Arrigo as the nurse

== See also ==
- List of Italian films of 2015
