= Moriarty Rising: A Sherlock Holmes Tale =

- Directed by: Alessio Liguori
- Screenplay by: Oliver Draiv
- Based on: Sherlock Holmes by Arthur Conan Doyle
- Produced by: Phil Viardo; Christopher Knight; Jonathan Miller; Rob McGillivray; Fabio Canepa; Gianluca Lazzaroni
- Starring: Ethan Vaughan; Ford Leland; Ciaran Cresswell; Rita Pilato
- Cinematography: Matteo de Angelis
- Production companies: Former Prodigy Media; Alation Media; Portrait Pictures; Marquee Content
- Release date: October 16, 2026
- Countries: United States; Italy
- Language: English

Moriarty Rising: A Sherlock Holmes Tale is a 2026 American-Italian mystery drama production, based on the Sherlock Holmes characters and set to be released as both a multi-part vertical drama and a standard feature film.

== Plot ==
Mathematics student James Moriarty and detective Sherlock Holmes both arrive in Turin, Italy. Following the baffling theft of a precious diamond, the two begin their iconic rivalry.

== Cast ==
- Ethan Vaughan as James Moriarty
- Ford Leland as Sherlock Holmes
- Ciaran Cresswell as John Watson
- Rita Pilato as Lucia Rossi
- Constanza Ruff as Marcella Blanco
- Jayne Kimberley Bloom as Professor Francesca Lombroso
- Nathan Wiley as Mycroft Holmes
- Christopher Jones as The Rector
- Fjodor Olev as Sebastian Moran
- Tiffany Alexander as Natty

== Production ==
The project was announced in June 2026 as one of the first major vehicle for Former Prodigy Media, the production company of producer Phil Viardo and actor Christopher Knight, and as a release for the company's microdrama division Marquee Content. It is set to be the third in a series of such "dual format" (microdrama-film) productions, made in part for Former Prodigy's commercial division Marquee Content, Portrait Pictures and Alation Media.

Two months later, filming had completed in Turin, and the cast was unveiled. Alps Studios assumed post-production duties.

Moriarty Rising will premiere at the inaugural ALZA Festival, set to be held in New York City as America's first festival oriented toward vertical dramas. It will release on October 16, 2026. Other titles include fellow Former Prodigy production Billionaire's Broken Vow, and Shanghai Sherlock, also based on the Sherlock Holmes characters.
