= Report 51 =

2013 Italian sci-fi horror film

- Directed by: Alessio Liguori
- Written by: Alessio Liguori; Giuliano Tomassacci
- Produced by: Alessio Liguori; Giuliano Tomassacci
- Starring: Michela Bruni; Luca Guastini; Viola Graziosi; Damiano Martina; Ann Pierssens
- Cinematography: Giuliano Tomassacci
- Edited by: Danilo Tallini
- Music by: Angelo Talocci
- Release date: 1 November 2013 (Trieste)
- Running time: 100 minutes
- Country: Italy
- Language: English

Report 51 (also known as Report 51: Alien Invasion) is a 2013 Italian found footage-science fiction horror film directed by Alessio Liguori, who co-wrote and co-produced the movie with cinematographer Giuliano Tomassacci.

== Cast ==
- Michela Bruni as Amber
- Luca Guastini as James
- Viola Graziosi as Linda
- Damiano Martina as John
- Ann Pierssens as Ann

== Release ==
The film premiered at Trieste Science+Fiction Festival on 1 November 2013.

== Bibliography ==
- Uva, Christian (2012). Cinema digitale. Teorie e pratiche. Florence: Le Lettere. p. 175.
