= Villa Rachele =

- Frazione
- Location of Villa Rachele in Italy
- Coordinates: 45°33′N 9°13′E
- Country: Italy
- Region: Lombardy
- Province: Milan (MI)
- Comune: Cinisello Balsamo
- Elevation: 154 m (505 ft)
- Demonym(s): Cinisellesi and Balsamesi
- Time zone: UTC+1 (CET)
  - Summer (DST): UTC+2 (CEST)
- Postal code: 20092
- Dialing code: +39 02
- Patron saint: St. Ambrose
- Saint day: 7 December
- Website: Official website

Villa Rachele is a district in the southern west area of the city of Cinisello Balsamo, in Italy, bordering the Parco Nord in Bresso and bordering Sesto San Giovanni. This area, a slender strip of land, beyond the Viale Fulvio Testi, bordering Sest S.G., Ward Rondinella, a periphery made up of large apartment buildings, car parks, little green, and many clochard and immigrants.

== See also ==
- Cinisello Balsamo
- Crocetta (Cinisello Balsamo)
- SS36
