= Miriam Galanti =

Italian actress and television presenter (born 1989)

- Born: 5 April 1989 (age 37); Mantua, Lombardy, Italy
- Education: Centro Sperimentale di Cinematografia
- Occupations: Actress, television presenter
- Years active: 2009–present

Miriam Galanti (born 5 April 1989) is an Italian actress and television presenter.

== Life and career ==
Galanti was born 5 April 1989 in Mantua, and grew up in Borgoforte, she graduated at Centro Sperimentale di Cinematografia in 2015 and began her acting career in Rome.

She won the Grey Goose's "An Acting Talent Beyond" Award for the Best Newcomer Actor at the 71st Venice International Film Festival. After few minor roles in television series such as Don Matteo and Che Dio ci aiuti, Galanti starred as the lead in the 2018 thriller film Scarlett. For her role of the antagonist Sonia in the 2019 horror film In the Trap, she was awarded with the Kinéo Prize at the 76th Venice International Film Festival.

In 2020, Galanti co-hosted with Dario Vergassola the documentary show Sei in un Paese meraviglioso on Sky Arte. In 2021, she was the narrator of the Sky documentary Dante: La visione nell'arte for the 700th anniversary of Dante Alighieri's death. She also hosted the 2021 Pesaro International Film Festival.

On 8 March 2022, she was among the nine testimonials of the International Women's Day campaign against violence against women at the Chamber of Deputies. In 2024, Galanti played the role of Greta in the third season of Carlo Verdone's series Vita da Carlo.

== Personal life ==
Galanti was in a relationship with actor and television personality Gilles Rocca from 2009 to 2023.

== Filmography ==
Film
Year	Title	Role	Notes
2011	Cinque		Uncredited role
2014	3:32		Short film
2014	Metamorfosi	Woman	Short film
2015	Arianna	Psychodrama girl	
2016	The Good Italian II: The Prince Goes to Milan	Prince's niece	Short film
2016	A Special Day		Short film
2016	Alain	Sarah	Short film
2017	Rock My Trumpet	Ena	Short film
2018	When Nuvolari Runs: The Flying Mantuan	Elena	
2018	Scarlett	Giulia	Lead role
2019	Lost & Found	Girl	Short film
2019	In the Trap	Sonia	
2020	Quarantine Punch	Miriam	Short film
2022	Cinema Aurora	Sofia	Short film

Television
Year	Title	Role	Notes
2009	Don Matteo	Number 18	TV series; episode "Perfetta"
2012–2019	Che Dio ci aiuti	Passport girl / Lilia	TV series; 2 episodes
2013	Roma nuda	Donna Sebastiani	TV miniseries; main role
2020	Sei in un Pease meraviglioso	Co-host	TV show; 15 episodes
2021	Dante: La visione nell'arte	Host / Narrator	TV documentary
2022	Tale e quale show	Guest	TV show
2024	Vita da Carlo	Greta	TV series; 5 episodes
2025	Sicily Express	Miriam	TV miniseries; 2 episodes
