= A Quiet Place in the Country =

1968 film

- Italian film poster
- Italian: Un tranquillo posto di campagna
- Directed by: Elio Petri
- Screenplay by: Luciano Vincenzoni; Elio Petri
- Story by: Tonino Guerra; Elio Petri
- Based on: "The Beckoning Fair One" by Oliver Onions
- Produced by: Alberto Grimaldi
- Starring: Franco Nero; Vanessa Redgrave; Georges Géret; Gabriella Boccardo; Madeleine Damien; Rita Calderoni
- Cinematography: Luigi Kuveiller
- Edited by: Ruggero Mastroianni
- Music by: Ennio Morricone; Gruppo di Improvvisazione Nuova Consonanza
- Production companies: Produzioni Europee Associate; Produzioni Associate Delphos; Les Productions Artistes Associés
- Distributed by: Produzioni Europee Associate (Italy); United Artists (International)
- Release dates: 14 November 1968 (Italy); 14 August 1969 (France)
- Running time: 105 minutes
- Countries: Italy; France
- Box office: ₤387.358 million

A Quiet Place in the Country (Italian: Un tranquillo posto di campagna, French: Un coin tranquille à la campagne) is a 1968 giallo thriller film directed by Elio Petri, and starring Franco Nero and Vanessa Redgrave. Based on the short story "The Beckoning Fair One" by Oliver Onions, its plot follows an artist who relocates to a rural villa with his girlfriend, where he begins to experience increasingly terrifying, apparently supernatural events.

== Plot ==
Renowned visual artist Leonardo Ferri has been unable to paint for some time. His girlfriend Flavia presses him to work again, so she can sell the paintings in the gallery she owns. Wanting to escape the bustle of Milan, Leonardo declares he needs to move to the Italian countryside. Flavia arranges for him to stay in a large mansion, but Leonardo finds himself obsessively drawn to a sprawling, dilapidated abandoned villa nearby. Leonardo breaks into the gated property one afternoon and meets Attilio, its longtime caretaker, who tells him the owners want to sell it. Leonardo rents the property and begins working to restore it. He hires a young woman, Egle, as a housekeeper.

Upon moving in, Leonardo finds himself disturbed by ominous noises throughout the estate. The following morning, while purchasing goods, Leonardo is informed by a shopkeeper that a young countess, Wanda, died on the property during an airstrike in World War II, in which she was shot to death. Later that day, Leonardo notices a strange man leaving flowers along the exterior wall where Wanda died. Flavia arrives to help Leonardo restore the villa, but shortly after her arrival she is met by a series of frightening accidents: she falls through a weakened section of floor, injuring her leg; later, a bookshelf mysteriously topples over, nearly hitting her. Disturbed by the events, Flavia leaves, telling Leonardo she is frightened by the property.

Leonardo begins inquiring about Wanda among the locals, who inform him she was a nymphomaniac. Leonardo speaks with the local butcher, who confesses he had a longstanding affair with Wanda, and also informs him she carried on dalliances with Attilio and numerous other men. The butcher sends Leonardo to visit Wanda's ailing mother, who now lives destitute in an apartment in Venice. Leonardo manages to convince her he is a journalist writing about the aristocracy. Wanda's mother shows him various mementos of Wanda's, including a red satin dress. While there, Leonardo steals several photos of Wanda and brings them back to the villa.

Attilio later confesses to Leonardo that he is the one who leaves flowers at Wanda's death site and that he was with her when she died. Attilio shows Leonardo a small room in the house, with a one-way mirror, where he and Wanda frequently had sex while her mother watched. Attilio confesses that one day, upon seeing Wanda having sex with a German soldier in the room, he beat the man to death. Wanda helped him bury the body on the property. The same day, Wanda was killed in the airstrike.

Flavia returns to visit Leonardo and finds the restoration of the property has hardly progressed. He attempts to have sex with her, but his violent demeanor disturbs her. The two make up and Leonardo asks her to stay and attend a dinner party he is hosting. While showering, Flavia is shocked by an electrical current and becomes convinced that a supernatural entity in the house does not want her there. During the dinner party, Leonardo organizes a séance, in which the guests attempt to contact Wanda's spirit. The séance is cut short when the table begins to shake violently and an unseen presence strangles Flavia.

After the guests leave, Leonardo confronts Flavia upstairs and she realizes he tried to strangle her. He threatens her with a knife. She attempts to flee, but he pursues her through the villa, beating her to death with a shovel and then dismembering her corpse. The attack awakens Egle and her boyfriend. Leonardo binds and gags them and uses their bodies as part of his paintings. At dawn, Leonardo has a series of bizarre visions: a group of soldiers pass through the property with Attilio, who admits Wanda survived the air attack and that he shot her to death, making it look like she was killed by the plane. Outside, Leonardo sees numerous artists painting on canvases in the field while soldiers stand guard. Officers arrive at the villa and Leonardo, believing himself to have murdered Flavia, tells them she is in Milan. As he is escorted outside by psychiatrists, Leonardo sees Flavia waiting among the police and attacks her.

Some time later, Leonardo is incarcerated in a psychiatric institution. He obsessively paints small, sexually themed paintings, while an orderly supplies him with pornographic magazines for inspiration. The orderly presses him to paint more, just like Flavia used to. Unbeknownst to Leonardo, Flavia purchases the paintings from the orderly, to show in her gallery.

== Cast ==
- Franco Nero as Leonardo Ferri
- Vanessa Redgrave as Flavia
- Georges Géret as Attilio
- Gabriella Boccardo (as Gabriella Grimaldi) as Wanda Vallier
- Madeleine Damien as Mrs. Vallier
- Rita Calderoni as Egle
- Renato Menegotto as Egle's Friend
- Valerio Ruggeri as Tony, the Butcher
- David Mansell as the Psychic
- John Francis Lane as the Asylum Nurse

== Production ==
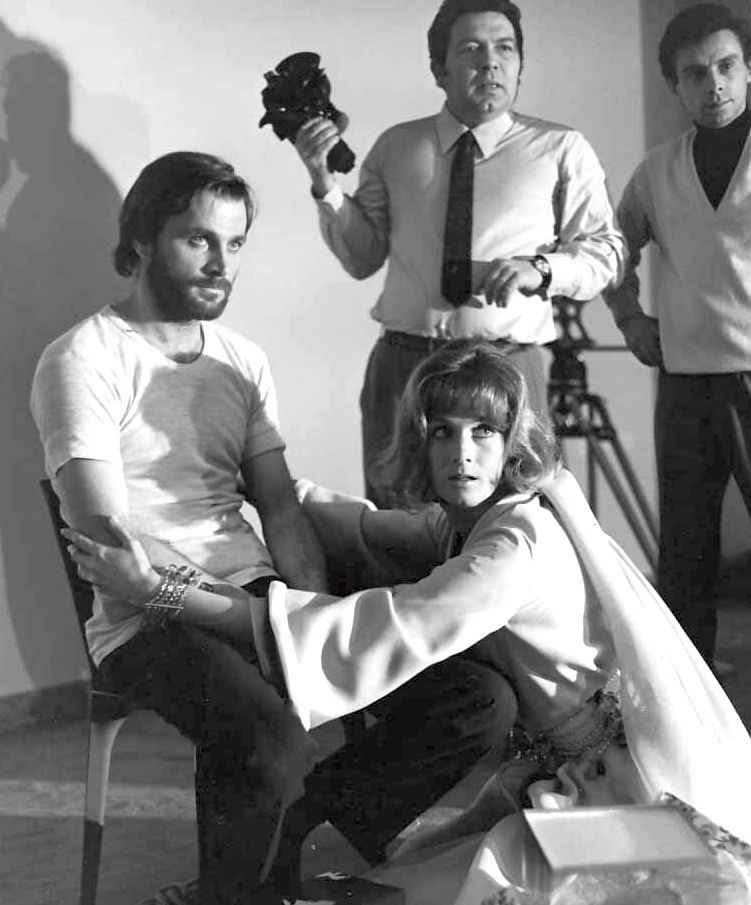
Nero and Redgrave with director Elio Petri

A Quiet Place in the Country was a story originally written by Tonino Guerra and Elio Petri in 1962 based on "The Beckoning Fair One" by George Oliver Onions. A new script for it was written by Luciano Vincenzoni and Petri.

Principal photography began in Rome in April 1968. Gabriella Boccardo, a beauty contest competitor, was cast in May 1968 after filming had begun.

== Release ==
A Quiet Place in the Country was released in Italy on 14 November 1968. The film was distributed theatrically in by P.E.A.—United Artists, where it grossed 387.358 million Italian lira. It was released in France on 14 August 1969 and the United States on 28 August 1970. A Quiet Place in the Country was entered into the 19th Berlin International Film Festival, where it won a Silver Bear award.

On 9 August 2011, MGM Home Entertainment released A Quiet Place in the Country on DVD as part of their Limited Edition Collection. Scream Factory released the film on Blu-ray on 26 September 2017.

== Critical response ==
From contemporary reviews, Robert Hawkins of Variety proclaimed that "If there is such a thing as an intellectual horror pic, this official Italian Berlin Fest entry comes close." He found the film "carefully planned and made, but ultimately pretentious." Charles Champlin of the Los Angeles Times praised the film as "well done," and compared the screenplay to the madness-themed works of Edgar Allan Poe. Ann Guarino of the New York Daily News noted the film as a "haunting" horror film, awarding it two-and-a-half out of four stars, praising Nero's performance as "excellent" and Redgrave's as "enchanting."

The Boston Globe's Kevin Kelly described the film "preposterously bad," panning Nero and Redgrave's performances and ultimately deemed the film as "comic book trash." Christopher Dafoe of the Vancouver Sun noted the film as "nonsense," but conceded that it is "filmed very beautifully in rich color."

From retrospective reviews, Dennis Schwartz of Ozus' World Movie Reviews rated the film a B−, writing, "How well you like this freaky tale, with an unsettling tone, depends on how much you fall in love with the stunning kaleidoscope cinematography of Luigi Kuveiller and the director's bizarre logic he brings to the creative process as something that borders on the edge of sanity. For me it was a bit too pretentious, though its startling images were chillingly effective." Paul Mavis from DVD Talk gave the film 5/5 stars, writing, "Disturbing, sensational aural/visual experience. Writer/director Elio Petri creates a completely unstable environment for his tale of personal madness, artistic chaos, and supernatural violence. Vanessa Redgrave and Franco Nero are beautiful to look at here. One of a kind." Steve Langton from The Spinning Image awarded the film 8/10 stars, stating, "Granted, A Quiet Place In The Country does occasionally threaten to slide into over-indulgence, but one of its main strengths may be that Petri was either unable or unwilling to play by the rules."

== Sources ==
- Curti, Roberto (2015). Italian Gothic Horror Films, 1957–1969. Jefferson, North Carolina: McFarland. ISBN 978-1-4766-1989-7.
