= David Bailie =

South African actor (1937–2021)

- Born: 4 December 1937; Springs, South Africa
- Died: 5 March 2021 (aged 83); Hammersmith and Fulham, London, England
- Occupations: Actor, photographer, videographer, computer programmer, furniture maker/designer
- Years active: 1961–2020
- Spouse: Egidija Bailie (m. 2002–2021)
- Website: https://davidbailie.co.uk/

David Bailie (4 December 1937 – 5 March 2021) was a South African actor known for his performances on stage, television, and film. In the 1960s and 1970s, he worked for both the National Theatre and the Royal Shakespeare Company, where he was an associate artist. He played "Dask" in the 1977 Doctor Who serial The Robots of Death and also appeared in Blake's 7.

Bailie portrayed "Skewer" in Cutthroat Island (1995), an English Judge in The Messenger: The Story of Joan of Arc (1999), and also "The Engineer" in Gladiator (2000). David Bailie is perhaps best known for having played the mute pirate Cotton in the Pirates of the Caribbean series. Bailie was also a professional photographer, specialising in portrait photography. He had a studio in West Kensington, London.

== Personal life ==
Bailie was born in Springs, South Africa on 4 December 1937, and went to boarding school in Swaziland (now Eswatini) before emigrating to Rhodesia (now Zimbabwe) with his family in 1952. He had his first role in a 1955 amateur production of Doctor in the House, which convinced him to pursue acting. After leaving school he worked in a bank and then for Central African Airlines. In 1958, he made his first trip from Rhodesia to Britain.

Bailie died on 5 March 2021 at the age of 83.

== Career ==
In 1960, Bailie moved to Britain from South Africa, having been cast for a minor role in the film Flame in the Streets (1961). Subsequently, he played one of the bell boys in Arthur Kopit's Oh Dad, Poor Dad, Mamma's Hung You in the Closet and I'm Feelin' So Sad (1961) with Stella Adler playing Madame Rospettle. He then bluffed his way into weekly repertory in Barrow-in-Furness as a juvenile lead, though he was worried his inexperience would show.

Recognising the need for training, he auditioned three times for a bursary to the RADA, each time being accepted only as a fee-paying student, which he could not afford. He sent for the last of his standby money (£200), which he had left in Rhodesia, and paid for the first term (1963). At the end of the term, he persuaded John Fernald to allow him free tuition for the next two years.

Terry Hands was also a student at the same time, but had left earlier than Bailie and formed the Everyman Theatre with Peter James in Liverpool. Upon leaving RADA, Bailie was invited to join the Everyman in 1964. Amongst other roles, he played Tolen in The Knack..., Becket in Murder in the Cathedral, Dion in The Great God Brown, MacDuff in Macbeth and Lucky in Waiting for Godot.

After a year there, Bailie returned to London and auditioned for and was accepted by Sir Laurence Olivier, joining the National Theatre. He played minor roles and understudied Olivier in different plays, including Love for Love.

Terry Hands, who had since joined the Royal Shakespeare Company (RSC) at Stratford-upon-Avon (and later became its artistic director), invited Bailie to join them as an associate artist in 1965. There he portrayed "Florizel" opposite Judi Dench's "Perdita" in The Winter's Tale along with "Valentine" in The Two Gentlemen of Verona, "The Bastard" in King John, "Kozanka" in The Plebeians Rehearse the Uprising and "Leslie" in The Madness of Lady Bright.

During the early 1970s, Bailie worked with Stomu Yamashta at his Red Buddha Theatre. He was cast as the lead in a show called Raindog, which required him to sing, dance, perform martial arts and gymnastics. He later admitted that this job was too demanding for him. When Yamashta offered him a small sum for his performance, he departed the theatre. He was then cast by Michael E. Briant in 1976 to play the part of the villain "Dask" in the Doctor Who serial The Robots of Death. He also played in a number of other series prominent at the time.

Bailie then took a long hiatus from his acting career for personal reasons. Between 1980 and 1989, he ran a furniture-making business. In 1990, he closed down the furniture business and restarted his acting career. Around this time, Bailie developed cancer in his lip, necessitating its removal and forcing him to relearn how to speak. While awaiting work in the acting field, he busied himself with CAD design, self-training, writing computer programs, and also doing health and safety work in the building industry.

In the mid-1990s, after playing alongside Brian Glover in The Canterbury Tales, he made a comeback in the film business as "Skewer" in Cutthroat Island (1995), then played an English Judge in The Messenger: The Story of Joan of Arc (1999), and also "The Engineer" in Gladiator (2000).

Bailie's best-known work in film is the role of "Cotton", a mute pirate who had his tongue cut out, so he trained his parrot, also named Cotton, to speak on his behalf. Bailie first appears as Cotton in Pirates of the Caribbean: The Curse of the Black Pearl (2003) as one of the pirates Jack Sparrow chooses in Tortuga. He is one of the Black Pearl crewmembers to survive the Kraken attack in the sequel Dead Man's Chest (2006) and also played Cotton in the third instalment: At World's End (2007). His character did not say any lines in the three films. Bailie found this to be a problem and proposed to director Gore Verbinski and writer Terry Rossio a storyline that Cotton was able to speak, but it was not included in the films.

In 2014, Bailie joined the ensemble cast of the British-American short Artificio Conceal for the role of Vitruvius. The film, written and directed by Ayoub Qanir, was selected to film festivals worldwide, including the Cannes Film Festival's Short Film Corner, the Edinburgh International Film Festival, and the Seattle International Film Festival.

Bailie reprised his Doctor Who role as Dask in the Kaldor City audio drama series. He was also involved in Big Finish Productions audio dramas playing the Celestial Toymaker.

Bailie also worked as a professional photographer, with portraiture and landscapes being his speciality.

He established a YouTube channel, mdebailes, where he uploaded readings and performance excerpts.

== Filmography ==
=== Film ===
Year	Title	Role	Notes
1961	Flame in the Streets		Uncredited
1968	All's Well That Ends Well	Morgan, a soldier	TV film
1972	Henry VIII and His Six Wives	Norris	
1973	The Creeping Flesh	Young Doctor	
1973	Son of Dracula	Chauffeur	
1973	Wipers Three	Lieutenant General Smuts	TV film
1975	Legend of the Werewolf	Boulon	
1977	Golden Rendezvous	Younger terrorist in car	Uncredited
1979	The First Part of King Henry the Fourth, with the Life and Death of Henry Surnamed Hotspur	Second Carrier	TV film
1995	Cutthroat Island	Dawg's Pirate	
1999	The Messenger: The Story of Joan of Arc	English Judge	
2000	Gladiator	Engineer	
2003	Pirates of the Caribbean: The Curse of the Black Pearl	Cotton	
2005	Starfly	Commander / Doctor	Short
2006	Pirates of the Caribbean: Dead Man's Chest	Cotton	
2007	Pirates of the Caribbean: At World's End	Cotton	
2007	Eddie Proctor	Eddie Proctor	Short
2007	The Comebacks	Prisoner	
2009	Shadows in the Wind	Mr. Behrman	Short
2011	Pirates of the Caribbean: Tales of the Code – Wedlocked	Cotton	Short
2011	Tribe	Wentzelow	
2013	Traveller	Wentzelow	
2014	October 1	Ackerman	
2014	Artificio Conceal	Vitruvius	Short
2015	The Timber	Sheriff Snow	
2017	The Beyond	Professor Jakob Brukiehm	
2018	The House That Jack Built	S.P.	
2019	In the Trap	Father Andrew	
2020	Darbar	Drug Overlord	Uncredited

=== Television ===
Year	Title	Role	Notes
1966	Ransom for a Pretty Girl	Colonel Caron	Mini-series
1971	The Fenn Street Gang	Student	Episode: "Leave It to Me, Darling"
1972	The Visitors	New porter	Mini-series
1972	Adam Smith	Reverend Douglas Black	2 episodes
1973	The Regiment	Commandant De Jong	Episode: "Ambush"
1974	Play for Today	Daniel Tasker	Episode: "The Lonely Man's Lover"
1975	Churchill's People	Bertram	Episode: "Silver Giant, Wooden Dwarf"
1975	Softly, Softly: Task Force	Scooby	Episode: "Whose Side Are You On?"
1975	Play of the Month	Sergeant Davidson	Episode: "The Little Minister"
1975	Play of the Month	Marcade	Episode: "Love's Labour's Lost"
1976	Plays for Britain	Disc jockey	Episode: "Hitting Town"
1977	Warship	Panmuir	Episode: "Wind Song"
1977	Doctor Who	Dask	Serial: "The Robots of Death"
1978	Blake's 7	Chevner	Episode: "Project Avalon"
1978	The Onedin Line	Branigan	Episode: "The Reverend's Daughter"
1997	The New Adventures of Robin Hood	Outlaw Mills	Episode: "Outlaw Express"
2001	Attila the Hun	Shaman	Mini-series
2009	Doctor Who: The Sixth Doctor Adventures	The Celestial Toymaker	Episode: "The Nightmare Fair"
2012	Sinbad	Brother Angelico	Episode: "Fiend or Friend?"
