= Marco Bocci =

Italian actor

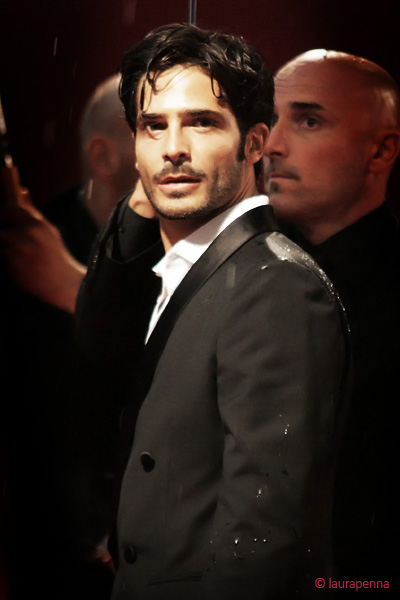
- Born: Marco Bocciolini; Marsciano, Italy
- Occupation: Actor
- Years active: 2001–present
- Height: 1.78 m (5 ft 10 in)

Marco Bocci (pseudonym of Marco Bocciolini) is an Italian actor. He appeared in more than 20 films since 2001. In 2016, Bocci published a novel, At Tor Bella Monaca It Never Rains (Italian: A Tor Bella Monaca Non Piove Mai).

== Filmography ==
=== Films ===
Year	Title	Role	Notes
2001	The Knights of the Quest	extra	uncredited
2006	The Borgia	Pedro Bembo	
2010	The Beautiful Society (La bella società	Giorgio	
2011	Some Say No	Pino Conca	
2014	Do You See Me?	Francesco	
2014	Me Romantic Romani (Io rom romantica)	Alessandro	
2014	Italo	Antonio Blanco	
2015	The Need To Unite With You Every Time ( L'esigenza di unirmi ogni volta con te)	Leonardo	
2018	Show Dogs	Carly	Italian dub; voice role
2019	The Gang Of Three (La banda dei tre)	Claudio Bambola	
2019	Of Sand And Fire (De sable et de feu)	Godoy	
2020	Caliber 9 (Calibro 9)	Fernando Piazza	
2021	Armed Bastards (Bastardi a mano armata)	Sergio	
2022	The Boat	Enrico	
2022	Strange World	Searcher Clade	Italian dub; voice role
2022	The Hunt (La caccia)	Nilo	also director
2023	Double Soul	Omar	

=== Television ===
Year	Title	Role	Notes
2003	The Beauty Of Women (Italian: Il bello delle donne)	Luca's lover	episode: "April" ("Aprile")
2005–2006	Spell (Spell)	Adriano Gomez	11 episodes
2006	RIS Imperfect Crimes (Italian: R.I.S. Delitti Imperfetti)	Stefano Vietti	episode: "Unsuspected" ("Insospettabile")
2006	America's Uncle (Lo zio d'America)	Luca	3 episodes
2007	Tiger Scratch (Graffio di tigre)	Nerone	television film
2007	Catherine And Her Daughters (Caterina e le sue figlie)	Pietro Tramonti	6 episodes
2008	I married A Cop (Ho sposato uno sbirro)	Simone Ardea	5 episodes
2008–2010	Crime Novel – The Series (Crime Novel – La serie)	Inspector Nicola Scialoja	main role
2009	A Witch's Love (Un amore di strega)	Max	television film
2011	Atelier Fontana - The Sisters Of Fashion (Atelier Fontana - Le sorelle della moda)	Enrico Landi	miniseries
2011–2015	Anti-Mafia Squad – Palermo today (Squadra antimafia – Palermo oggi)	Domenico Calcaterra	main role (seasons 3-7)
2012	One Thousand and One Nights: Aladdin and Sherazade (Le mille e una notte: Aladino e Sherazade)	Aladdin	miniseries, three parts
2013	K2 - The Mountain Of The Italians (K2 - La montagna degli italiani)	Walter Bonatti	television film
2018	Free Dreamers (Liberi sognatori	Giuseppe Francese	episode: "Mafia Crime: Mario Francese" ("Delitto di Mafia: Mario Francese")
2019	Made in Italy	John Sassi / Giorgio Armani	main role
2021	Until The Last Beat (Fino all'ultimo battito)	Diego Mancini	lead role
