= Alessio Liguori =

Italian film director (born 1981)

- Born: 1 January 1981 (age 45); Formia, Italy
- Occupation: Director

Alessio Liguori (born 1 January 1981) is an Italian film director.

== Career ==
Liguori graduated from Rome's DAMS (Discipline delle Arti, della Musica e dello Spettacolo), after which he directed several advertising campaigns, including for Save the Children. He directed his first short film La rete in 2010.

2013 saw the release of his debut feature Report 51, a found footage science fiction thriller. This was followed by the horror film In the Trap in 2019. Both films premiered at Trieste Science+Fiction Festival.

Following films included Shortcut (2020) and The Boat (2022). Il viaggio leggendario and Black Bits both released in 2023.

In 2026, it was announced that Liguori would direct Moriarty Rising: A Sherlock Holmes Tale for Greif Produktion and Christopher Knight's company Former Prodigy Media. Filming was fully completed less than two months later. The project will release as both a vertical drama and a theatrical feature film.

== Filmography ==
Year	Title	Language	Notes
2010	La rete	Italian	Short film
2011	Every One Save the Children	Italian	Campaign
2013	La più bella del mondo	Italian	Short film
2013	La direzione	Italian	Music video
2013	Report 51	English	Feature film debut
2014	Ora: Brilha	Italian	Music video
2015	Subiaco. Una storia da raccontare	Italian	Short film
2016	Darkly	English	Television film
2018	Come Back	Italian	Short film
2019	In the Trap	English	Feature film
2020	Shortcut	English	Feature film
2022	The Boat	Italian	Feature film
2022	Alien Annihilation	English	Feature film
2023	Il viaggio leggendario	Italian	Feature film
2023	Black Bits	English	Feature film
2027	Moriarty Rising: A Sherlock Holmes Tale †	English	Dual format (vertical drama/feature film), post-production
