= Together (1980 TV series) =

- Genre: Soap opera
- Country of origin: United Kingdom
- Original language: English
- No. of seasons: 2
- No. of episodes: 53 (2 missing)

Production
- Running time: 30 minutes
- Production company: Southern Television

Original release
- Network: ITV
- Release: 24 January 1980 – 3 April 1981

Together is a daytime soap opera made by the ITV franchise Southern Television. The two series were broadcast twice weekly for 13 weeks apiece in 1980 and 1981. One episode from each of the two series is considered "missing" and is not known to be held in the archives.

The second series, in 1981, was transmitted live. Its theme song was written by John Dankworth and sung by Cleo Laine.

== Synopsis ==
The series concerns the residents of a fictitious housing association block of flats named Rutherford Court. Actors featured include Raymond Francis, Carol Hawkins, Margaretta Scott, Kathleen Byron, Victor Maddern, and Sarah Greene. Episode writers include Rosemary Anne Sisson, Adele Rose, Phil Redmond and Alfred Shaughnessy. The series covers issues including abortion and homosexuality. It contains some (mild) swearing, but there are also instances of censorship, by the removal from the soundtrack of language which is now regarded by some as unacceptable. Brief references to events close to the time of broadcast such as inflation rates, a steel strike, Cheltenham races, and the Oxford-Cambridge boat race were often made, reinforcing the greater topicality of the show compared to other soaps which tended to be produced weeks before broadcast.

== Regular cast ==
- John Burgess as Duggie Webber
- Sheila Fay as Lynne Webber
- Kathleen Byron as Martha Finch
- Paul Hastings as Trevor Wallace
- Delena Kidd as Sarah Cunningham
- Stephen Churchett as Peter Hunt
- Raymond Francis as Edward Fuller
- Jonty Miller as Mike Gowers
- Carol Hawkins as Susi Powell
- Gillian Bailey as Julie Dunn
- Brian Jameson as Geoff Powell
- Hilda Fenemore as Dora Klein
- Victor Maddern as Harry Klein
- Margaretta Scott as Daphne Porter
- Richard Everett as Richard Dunn
- Christine Pollon as Mary Sutton
- Christopher Burgess as Leslie Shepherd
- Sarah Greene as Tricia Webber
- John Malcolm as Arthur Sutton
- Wally Thomas as Joe Fripp
- Gina Maher as Charlene Frisby
- Sheila Gill as Elsie Potts
- Annie Leake as Lily Marsden
- Ernest Hare as Derek Harding

== Characters ==
- Duggie Webber (played by John Burgess). Duggie is married to Lynne, the warden of the flats, and he works as a general handyman and assistant. He used to be an electrician and carpenter and the couple ran a business in Australia but it failed and they returned to England. Early on it is clear he resents being seen as junior to his wife and is particularly annoyed when asked to take on cleaning work temporarily until Dora Klein takes over. He does come to terms with changed events but tensions between the couple occasionally re-emerge. . He is generally good-humoured but occasionally displays a more acerbic side. Although friends with Mike Gowers he disapproves or his daughter's relationship with him. He sometimes displays conservative social attitudes including speaking in favour of Margaret Thatcher's views on self-reliance and showing hostility to Trevor when his homosexuality is revealed. In the early part of Series 2 he and Lynne encounter some serious difficulties in their relationship and he even spends some time away, staying briefly at Sarah Cunningham's new flat though he insists this was platonic. The arrival of Lynne's niece Charlene then seems to keep the couple occupied and their relationship improves.
- Lynne Webber (played by Sheila Fay). Lynne is the flat warden and Liverpudlian wife of Duggie. She manages the flats very helpfully and efficiently and is well-regarded by the residents. The emigration of her daughter Tricia to work in Australia between series does make her somewhat downbeat at the start of Series 2 as do some serious disagreements with Duggie. Her niece Charlene then arrives and this seems to bond the couple together as they try to keep her on the right track.
- Tricia Webber (played by Sarah Greene, Series 1 only) is the 18 year-old daughter of Duggie and Lynne. Although not resident in the flats she works as a hairdresser in its salon. A cheerful and popular young woman, she initially is attracted to Trevor Hastings but he only wants friendship. Although initially lukewarm about Mike Gowers she is impressed when he starts to exhibit more considerate behaviour and the two have a brief romance before the opposition of her father and the return of an old girlfriend of Mike brings it to an end. Between Series 1 and 2 she moves to work in Australia.
- Charlene Frisby (played by Gina Maher, Series 2 only). Charlene is Lynne's teenage niece (her sister's daughter) and she arrives from Birkenhead early in Series 2 after her relationship with her mother breaks down. Charlene is lively and high-spirited to the point of irresponsibility and while a likeable young woman she provides Lynne and Duggie with plenty of problems. Charlene has no career plans other than trying to be a singer which her aunt and uncle tell her is a pipe dream to no avail. She has an apparently fruitless trip to London to try to get singing work but at the end of the Series 2 she receives a call offering her the chance to make a record.
- Harry Klein (played by Victor Maddern, Series 1 only). Harry is a middle-aged taxi driver who works night shifts. He is generally good-humoured but his relationship with his wife is sometimes tense due to his traditional attitudes and reluctance for her to have outside employment, as well as his lack of support for her interests. He is one of the residents who shows negativity towards Trevor when he learns he is gay. Harry and his wife Dora did not reappear in Series 2 but there was no explanation for their departure.
- Dora Klein (played by Hilda Fenemore, Series 1 only). Dora is married to Harry and is a cheerful and helpful woman who gets on well with others although her relationship with Harry is sometimes awkward. She works as a cleaner in the flats and takes pride in winning a writing competition despite her husband's lack of interest and encouragement.
- Martha Finch (played by Kathleen Byron). Martha is 59 years old and unmarried and is a retired shop assistant. She lives with her much younger sister Sarah. Martha comes across in Series 1 as bitter, judgemental and very ready to find fault in others. She has a difficult relationship with her sister whose drinking and relationships trouble her. Despite this she is very upset when Sarah moves out at the end of Series 1 but maybe this departure, volunteering at the local hospital and the arrival of new resident Amy lead to her adopting a much more positive outlook on life although she still slips at times back into negativity. Although Sarah wants to return she turns her down, feeling that their improved relationship will suffer. Lynne later tells her that she can no longer stay in her double-bedroom flat after Sarah's departure; she doesn't want to move to a single one at Rutherford Court so tries to find accommodation elsewhere at an affordable price but is unsuccessful. This leads her to change her mind and agree to Sarah moving back in at the end of Series 2.
- Sarah Cunningham (played by Delena Kidd). She is a beautician and Martha's much younger sister (aged fifty). A divorcee, she has had problems with alcohol and a nervous breakdown and these have led to her moving in with Martha. Sarah enjoys going out and meeting men and her lifestyle annoys her sister leading to considerable conflict between then. Sarah decides it's best for her to move out at the end of Series 1 but seeing a change in her sister's attitude and missing the atmosphere at Rutherford Court she tries to move back at the start of Series 2. Her problems with alcohol continue and she suffers with loneliness and depression, compounded by worries about losing her job. She asks Martha to let her move back in and is politely rebuffed as Martha fears they will go back to feuding with each other but she relents at the end of Series 2.
- Trevor Wallace (played by Paul Hastings). Trevor is a steward for British Rail. Astute and affable, he attracts the interest early on of Tricia Webber but he only wants a platonic relationship with her. He is popular with the other residents until he is outed as gay by Mike Gowers which leads to some residents turning against him for a while. His desire to share his flat with his boyfriend Peter causes some division among residents although he does ultimately get official approval. They are far more accepted in Series 2 but their relationship runs into difficulties, largely because Trevor wants to do new things, exploring possibilities such as running a bar in Greece or buying a smallholding in Suffolk.
- Peter Hunt (played by Stephen Churchett). Peter is a hospital porter and friend of Trevor; like Trevor he is a helpful and well-regarded personality. Later it becomes apparent that the two are more than friends and Peter wants to move in with Trevor leading to opposition from some residents although after a vote permission is given. Peter feels settled at Rutherford Court unlike Trevor and the couple start to drift apart although they remain together at the end of the series.
- Richard Dunn (played by Richard Everett, Series 1 only). Richard is a young trainee solicitor. He is rather snobbish and not very popular among the other residents. He disapproves of his wife Julie's desire to have her own employment but reluctantly accepts it. At the end of Series 1 the couple move out after finding a new home.
- Julie Dunn (played by Gillian Bailey). Julie at first seems happy with being a traditional wife but later wants more independence and seeks outside employment to the opposition of her husband. She unexpectedly becomes pregnant and this creates some dilemmas for the couple as they would have to move elsewhere. They seem to have solved these difficulties but then Julie suffers a miscarriage.
- Dr Edward Fuller (played by Raymond Francis). He moves in near the end of Series 1 after many years living and working in Rhodesia (which was being renamed Zimbabwe at the time of broadcast), moving back to England after his retirement. An amiable man he is immediately popular with Elsie and Martha but his real attraction is to Daphne who was his girlfriend decades earlier before he moved abroad. However the departure of Daphne between series and financial problems make him much less upbeat early in Series 2. He tries to get some part-time medical work but without success. His financial difficulties seem to become less pressing and he continues to be a popular resident, often consulted for advice on medical and other problems such as helping Sarah Cunningham deal with her alcohol dependency.
- Mike Gowers (played by Jonty Miller, Series 1 only). Mike is a young milkman and self-styled "ladies man" who also has a tendency to dally with dubious ways of making money. He is generally very good-humoured but displays homophobic attitudes towards Trevor when he discovers that he is gay. Mike though comes to accept Trevor's sexuality and the two become friends. He has a short-lived romance with Tricia but this meets the opposition of her father and ends when a former girlfriend arrives and Tricia believes he has been unfaithful. He doesn't appear in Series 2 but his absence is unexplained.
- Daphne Porter (played by Margaretta Scott, Series 1 only). Daphne is a retired hospital matron and she sometimes gives medical advice and support. Generally well-liked and respected, she does have a tendency to want to take control which sometimes irks other residents. She is both excited and anxious when Dr Edward Fuller moves in as the pair were romantically involved forty years earlier before he moved abroad. However she leaves between series to stay with an aunt to the great disappointment of Edward.
- Leslie Shepherd (played by Christopher Burgess, Series 1 only) is a forty-eight year old clerk and divorcee. The divorce initially leads to him showing some resentment but later he becomes more reconciled to his new status. A quiet man he is thoughtful and open-minded and often a source of good advice to other residents. Near the end of Series 1 he is made redundant and not only worries about finding a new job at his age but also of struggling to pay the rent to stay at Rutherford Court. He doesn't appear in Series 2, another unexplained absence although it may have been linked to his financial problems.
- Elsie Potts (played by Sheila Gill, Series 1 only) is an elderly widow who often talks fondly of her late husband George. She frequently behaves in an eccentric manner and also reveals a surprising interest in motorbikes, a passion she shared with her husband. She has some genuine health scares but also fakes one in an attempt to get the attention of Dr Edward Fuller. She isn't seen in Series 2 but her departure isn't remarked on.
- Derek Harding (played by Ernest Hare features in the first part of Series 1. A retired businessman and magistrate he arrives very depressed. His wife has recently died and he initially contemplates suicide but overcomes such feelings while still struggling to adapt to living alone, lacking domestic skills such as cooking. He leaves Rutherford Court to live with relatives.
- Susi Powell (Series 2 only), a fitness instructor played by Carol Hawkins. She lives with Geoff Powell (played by Brian Jameson) who initially works in advertising but later becomes a freelance illustrator. It seems they are a happy married couple until the arrival of woman called Gill (played by Virginia Moore) who says she is looking for Geoff. Some residents assume she is his girlfriend and he is having an affair but it later transpires that Gill is Geoff's actual wife (from whom he is separated and has a young son called Toby) and that he and Susi are only posing as married. This also puts their place at Rutherford Court in jeopardy as it does not normally accept cohabiting couples. Gill wants Geoff back and Geoff feels increasingly torn, particularly missing his son Toby. Susi gets frustrated with him and believes Gill is manipulating him. Their relationship deteriorates and neither of them seems to see any way forward, the news that they have permission to stay in their flat offering little consolation. At the end of the series 2 Geoff makes the decision to leave, seemingly to return to his legal wife and son.
- Arthur Sutton (Series 2 only) played by John Malcolm. Arthur is a middle-aged man who used to be a driver in the army but now works for undertakers, driving a hearse - a job that embarrasses him and which he tries to keep secret. He is a bad-tempered and bigoted man, the only resident in Series 2 who shows prejudice towards Trevor and Pete but who also makes hostile comments about other minority groups. Halfway through Series 2 he suffers a stroke. While he finds the recovery process difficult it does also seem to soften his attitudes and personality to some degree and he starts to show more patience and warmth, particularly towards his wife.
- Mary Sutton (Series 2 only) played by Christine Pollon. Mary is the long-suffering wife of Arthur and is a very patient, supportive woman who is well-regarded by the other residents. Not only does she have difficulties with Arthur but also with her son Tony who works in banking in London. Tony shows little interest in his parents and lets her down frequently as well as being unfaithful to his girlfriend (her husband Arthur is less accepting of Tony's behaviour). Arthur's stroke brings her new challenges but also opportunities to take more initiative. With Arthur unable to drive she decides to learn; he initially disapproves but later helps her and he is pleased when she announces in the last episode that she has passed.
- Joe Fripp (Series 2 only, played by Wally Thomas), a widower and retired former merchant seaman from Leeds. Joe is a popular resident who often provides practical help and good advice to other residents although he has some early disagreements with Amy Barratt and Lily Marsden (played by Annie Leake). Lily is also widowed and over time the two become closer although still having occasional differences. Towards the end of Series 2 Joe asks Lily to marry him but she politely declines without completely ruling out the possibility. In the final episode they are due to celebrate a common birthday (Joe would be 72). Residents plan separate surprise parties for them but when they arrive they tell the other residents that they have indeed got married earlier in the day.
- Amy Barratt played by Patsy Smart. She appears in the first half of Series 2 as an older woman with a sparky personality, often at fairly good-natured odds with Joe Fripp.

== Production ==
A letter addressed to Charlene in episode 21 of Series 2 gives the address of Rutherford Court as in Basingstoke, Hampshire but no footage of the town is shown and indeed every scene across the two series takes place inside Rutherford Court or just outside its front entrance (a studio set). Some fleeting references to the Southern TV region appeared such as Mike Gowers having a picture of the Southampton F.C. squad in his flat while Trevor Hastings wore the club's scarf in one episode. Significant changes were made to the series format between the first and second series: a number of characters from the first series are absent in the second, with no explanation given for most of them. A number of the characters that continue from the first series into the second have quite a different personality, and the layout of the Rutherford Court building is different - for example a laundry / freezer room and a hairdressing salon feature occasionally in Series 1 only while a boiler room in which Duggie Webber sometimes invites his friends for drinks appears only in Series 2. Perhaps to highlight that episodes were airing live in Series 2 that day's newspapers were often visible in scenes although even in Series 1 newspapers from only a few days before transmission were seen, indicating that production was very close to the date of broadcast. Series 2 ended in April 1981 and after the producers of the programme Southern Television lost their franchise it did not return. The final episode ends in unusual fashion - the final scene takes place at a party and the camera slowly pulls away from the characters to show the crew at work on the concluding shots and credits.

== Re-releases ==
Together has been shown again on Talking Pictures TV in 2016, 2020, and 2021, with captions explaining the action within the two missing episodes. Some language now considered offensive, especially with regard to homosexuality, was removed. In July 2020, the series was released - including the dialogue removed from the repeat transmissions - on DVD by Renown Pictures, the parent company of Talking Pictures and owner of much of the Southern Television archive.
