= In the Trap =

2019 Italian horror film

- Film poster
- Italian: In the Trap - Nella trappola
- Directed by: Alessio Liguori
- Written by: Daniele Cosci
- Produced by: Luigi De Filippis
- Starring: Jamie Paul; David Bailie; Sonya Cullingford; Miriam Galanti
- Cinematography: Luca Santagostino
- Edited by: Jacopo Reale
- Music by: Massimiliano Mechelli
- Release date: 31 October 2019 (Trieste)
- Running time: 93 minutes
- Country: Italy
- Language: English
- Box office: $83,215

In the Trap is a 2019 Italian horror film directed by Alessio Liguori.

== Cast ==
- Jamie Paul as Philip
- David Bailie as Father Andrew
- Sonya Cullingford as Catherine
- Miriam Galanti as Sonia
- Paola Bontempi as Rose
- Delena Kidd as the old woman
- Jude Forsay as young Philip
- Leila Gauntlett as Isidora
- Amelia Clay as the next door's girl
- Robert Nairne as the Creature

== Release ==
The film premiered at Trieste Science+Fiction Festival on 31 October 2019.
