= Mario Milita =

Italian voice actor (1923–2017)

- Born: 26 June 1923; Cori, Italy
- Died: 22 August 2017 (aged 94); Rome, Italy
- Occupations: Actor; voice actor
- Years active: 1946–2012

Mario Milita (26 June 1923 – 22 August 2017) was an Italian actor and voice actor.

== Biography ==
An actor with a career spanning over 65 years, performing for the theatre, films, television, and radio shows, he became well known to the audiences for his voice work in animation. Because of his coarse, raspy voice, he was typically known for voicing elderly characters in cartoons, movies and other entertainment. He was known for being the official Italian voice of Grampa Simpson in The Simpsons from 1991 until his retirement in 2012 (except for the young Abraham, for which he alternated with the official Italian Homer voice, Tonino Accolla). He has also been the first Italian voice of Herbert from Family Guy and dubbed Fred Flintstone for many years.

In Italian dubs of live action films, Milita dubbed actors such as Desmond Llewelyn, Ed Williams and Brian Doyle-Murray. He provided the voice of Amos Tupper (portrayed by Tom Bosley) in a few episodes of Murder, She Wrote and Old Man Peabody (portrayed by Will Hare) in Back to the Future.

Since 2004, however, his voice had begun to weaken over time, causing it to become feeble and almost unrecognizable in his last years of activity. After Milita retired in 2012, he passed on the roles of Grampa Simpson and Herbert to Mino Caprio and Valerio Ruggeri respectively. In 2011, a year before his retirement, he released an interview.

== Death ==
Milita died in Rome on 22 August 2017 at the age of 94, of natural causes.

== Filmography ==
=== Cinema ===
- Montecassino (1946)
- Non ho paura di vivere (1952)
- Ultimatum alla vita (1962)
- The Hyena of London (1964)
- I criminali della metropoli (1967)
- Non ho tempo (1973)

=== Television ===
- Diagnosi - TV miniseries (1975)
- Gente tutto cuore - TV play (1965)
- La scalata - TV miniseries (1993)
- Lo zio d'America - TV series (2002)
- Stiamo bene insieme - TV series, episode 11 (2002)
- Il mondo è meraviglioso - TV film (2005)

== Voice work ==
=== Animation ===
- Alan Ford e il gruppo TNT contro Superciuk - Geremia Lettiga
- Pimpa - Additional voices
- L'eroe dei due mondi (film 1994) - Quarto
- Kate - the Taming of the Shrew - Gremio

==== Italian-dubbed animated roles ====
- Fred Flintstone in The Flintstones (3rd voice), The Jetsons Meet the Flintstones, The New Fred and Barney Show
- Grandpa Lou Pickles in The Rugrats Movie, Rugrats in Paris: The Movie, Rugrats Go Wild
- Grampa Simpson and The Pope in The Simpsons (seasons 1-22), Grampa Simpson in The Simpsons Movie
- Narrator and Doctor Harada in Captain Tsubasa
- Marvin Marsh and Harold Cartman in South Park (1st Italian dub)
- Herbert (seasons 1–9) and Francis Griffin (episodes 2x02, 4x18) in Family Guy
- Treebeard in The Lord of the Rings
- Ebeneezer Scrooge (Scrooge McDuck) in Mickey's Christmas Carol (1st Italian dub)
- Mumm-Ra in ThunderCats
- The Old Heretic in The Hunchback of Notre Dame
- Laughing Bull in Cowboy Bebop
- Old Theban in Hercules
- Gennai in Digimon Adventure
- Sparky in Lady and the Tramp II: Scamp's Adventure

=== Live action ===
- Fantozzi va in pensione - Additional voices

==== Italian-dubbed live action roles ====
- George "Miles" Jergens in Rocky
- Mickey Goldmill in Rocky V
- Old Man Peabody in Back to the Future
- Amos Tupper in Murder, She Wrote (episodes 1x01, 2x07, 2x14, 3x03, 3x06)
- Monsignor Fargo in True Confessions
- The Ancient One in Santa Claus: The Movie
- Ted Olsen in The Naked Gun 2½: The Smell of Fear, Naked Gun 33 1/3: The Final Insult
- Q in Moonraker, A View to a Kill
- Orderly Turkle in One Flew Over the Cuckoo's Nest
- Doc Wallace in The Quick and the Dead
- Grandpa Sam in ...And Justice for All
- Rabbi Ben Lewis in Keeping the Faith
- Frank Slater in Last Action Hero
- Man in Airport in Home Alone
- Cliff in Home Alone 2: Lost in New York
- Ernie in Snow Dogs
- Bud Beckett in Philadelphia
- Rudolf Smuntz in Mouse Hunt
- Priest in Bedazzled
- Bradley Tozer in High Road to China
- Mr. Finkle in Ace Ventura: Pet Detective
- Acme Vice President in Looney Tunes: Back in Action
- Abdul Ben Hassan in Blade Runner

=== Video games ===
- Fakir in Disney's Aladdin in Nasira's Revenge
- Grampa Simpson in The Simpsons Game
