= The Boat (2022 film) =

- Theatrical release poster
- Directed by: Alessio Liguori
- Written by: Gianluca Ansanelli; Ciro Zecca; Nicola Salerno
- Produced by: Marco Belardi
- Starring: Marco Bocci; Diane Fleri; Filippo Nigro
- Cinematography: Mirco Sgarzi
- Edited by: Luigi Mearelli
- Music by: Fabrizio Mancinelli
- Production companies: Lotus Production, Rai Cinema
- Distributed by: Minerva Pictures
- Release date: August 18, 2022 (Italy)
- Running time: 91 min
- Country: Italy
- Language: Italian

The Boat is a 2022 Italian thriller film directed by Alessio Liguori and starring Marco Bocci, Diane Fleri, and Filippo Nigro. The film was shot off the Amalfi Coast and near the port of Piano di Sorrento.

== Plot ==
Three young wealthy couples decide to spend an unforgettable weekend on a luxury yacht in the Mediterranean Sea. However, the long-awaited cruise quickly turns into a real nightmare for them. After the party, the passengers wake up in the middle of the open sea—just to find out that the fuel, food, life raft, and water have mysteriously disappeared from their yacht. Anchors, control systems, radio, and the desalination plant are not functionable. As the yacht keeps on drifting away from the shore, they soon hear an unknown voice on the walkie-talkie, that starts a chilling psychological game. Fear for their lives awakens the darkest sides in everyone, and the passengers have to discover a terrible truth from the past that they would like to forget.

== Cast ==
- Marco Bocci as Enrico
- Diane Fleri as Elena
- Filippo Nigro as Flavio
- Marina Rocco as Claudia
- Katsiaryna Shulha as Martina
- Alessandro Tiberi as Federico
