= Cinisello Balsamo =

Cinisello Balsamo Cinisell Balsom (Lombard)
- Comune
- Comune di Cinisello Balsamo
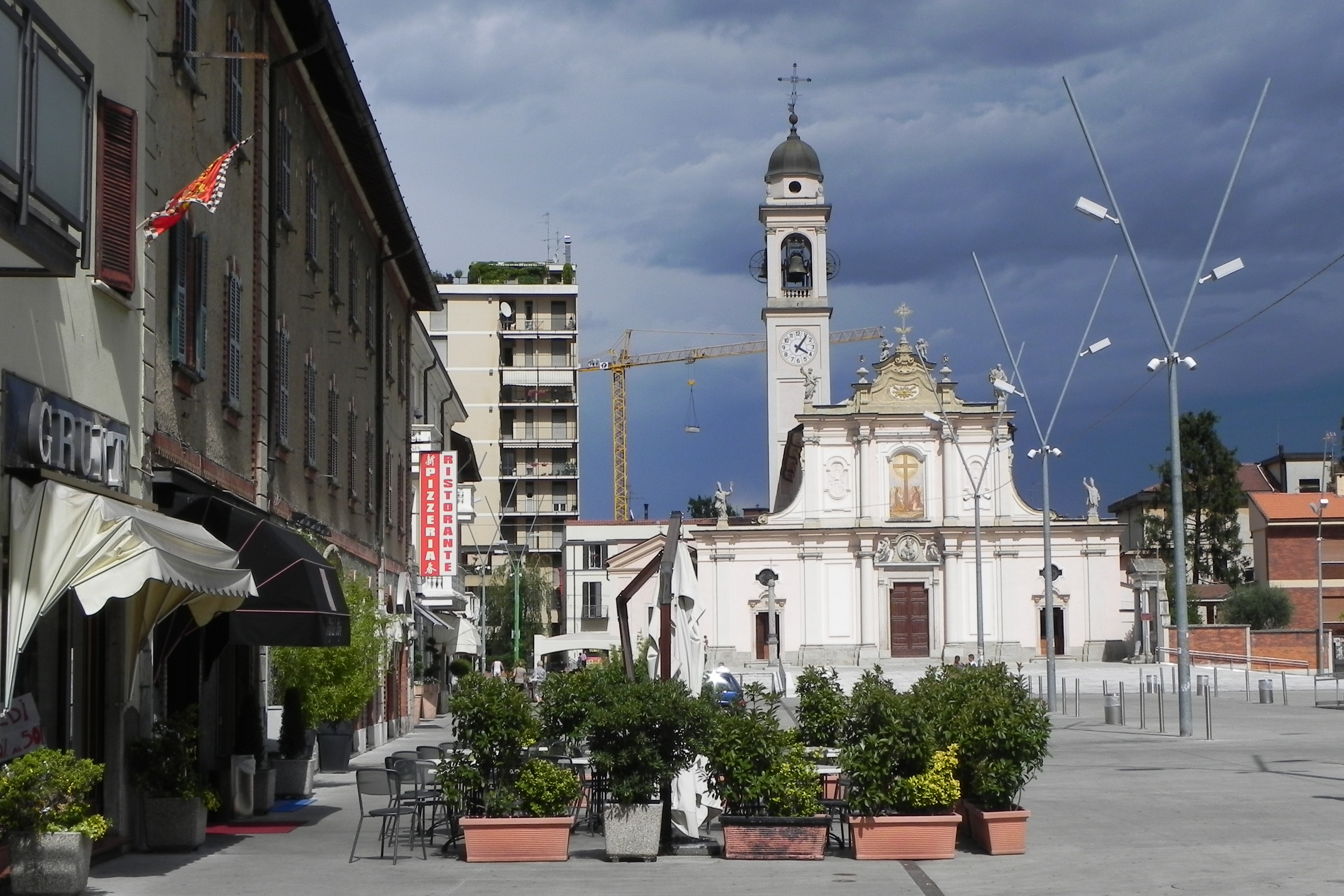
- Piazza Gramsci

- Coat of arms

- Location within Italy Location within Lombardy
- Coordinates: 45°33′N 9°13′E
- Country: Italy
- Region: Lombardy
- Metropolitan city: Milan (MI)
- Frazioni: Bellaria, Bettola, Borgo Misto, Campo dei Fiori, Casignolo, Cornaggia, Crocetta, Nigozza, Robecco, Sant'Eusebio, Villa Rachele

Government
  - Mayor: Giacomo Giovanni Ghilardi

Area
  - Total: 12.72 km^{2} (4.91 sq mi)
- Elevation: 154 m (505 ft)

Population (2026)
  - Total: 75,154
  - Density: 5,908/km^{2} (15,300/sq mi)
- Demonym(s): Cinisellesi and Balsamesi
- Time zone: UTC+1 (CET)
  - Summer (DST): UTC+2 (CEST)
- Postal code: 20092
- Dialing code: 02
- Patron saint: St. Ambrose
- Saint day: December 7
- Website: Official website

Cinisello Balsamo (Italian pronunciation: [tʃiniˈzɛllo ˈbalsamo]; Lombard: Cinisell Balsom [tʃiniˌzɛl ˈbaːlsum]) is a city and comune (municipality) in the Metropolitan City of Milan in the region of Lombardy in northern Italy, about 10 kilometres (6 mi) northeast of Milan. It has 75,154 inhabitants.

Cinisello Balsamo borders the municipalities of Monza, Muggiò, Nova Milanese, Paderno Dugnano, Cusano Milanino, Sesto San Giovanni, and Bresso.

The current comune was formed in 1928 by the union of Cinisello and Balsamo, and received the honorary title of city through a presidential decree on 17 October 1972.

== Etymology ==
Cinisello, originally called Cinixellum, is theorised to have its name come from "Cinis Aelli", "ash of the Aelli", the latter being a supposed Roman gens which would have found burial here.

Balsamo, originally called Balxamum and later Balsemum, is considered to have come from a noble Milanese family of the 10th century that had possessions here.

== History ==
Until the late 1920s, Cinisello and Balsamo were two separate municipalities. By royal decree, on 13 September 1928 a merger was arranged to form the current commune.

As a symbol, the emblem of the city now encompasses those of the two municipalities merged: the emblem of the pastoral and the sword on a red field in fact belongs to Balsamo, the rampant crowned lion on a blue field belongs to Cinisello.

== Demographics ==
As of 2026, the population is 75,154, of which 49.5% are males, and 50.5% are females. Minors make up 15.5% of the population, and seniors make up 24.6%.

Historical population

Year	Pop.	±%
1861	5,158	—
1871	5,285	+2.5%
1881	5,221	−1.2%
1901	6,011	+15.1%
1911	7,350	+22.3%
1921	7,955	+8.2%
1931	10,086	+26.8%
1936	11,859	+17.6%

Year	Pop.	±%
1951	15,336	+29.3%
1961	37,699	+145.8%
1971	77,284	+105.0%
1981	80,757	+4.5%
1991	76,262	−5.6%
2001	72,050	−5.5%
2011	71,128	−1.3%
2021	74,391	+4.6%

Source: ISTAT

=== Immigration ===
As of 2025, immigrants make up 22.9% of the population. The 5 largest foreign countries of birth are Egypt, Romania, Peru, Ecuador, and Ukraine.

== Sights ==
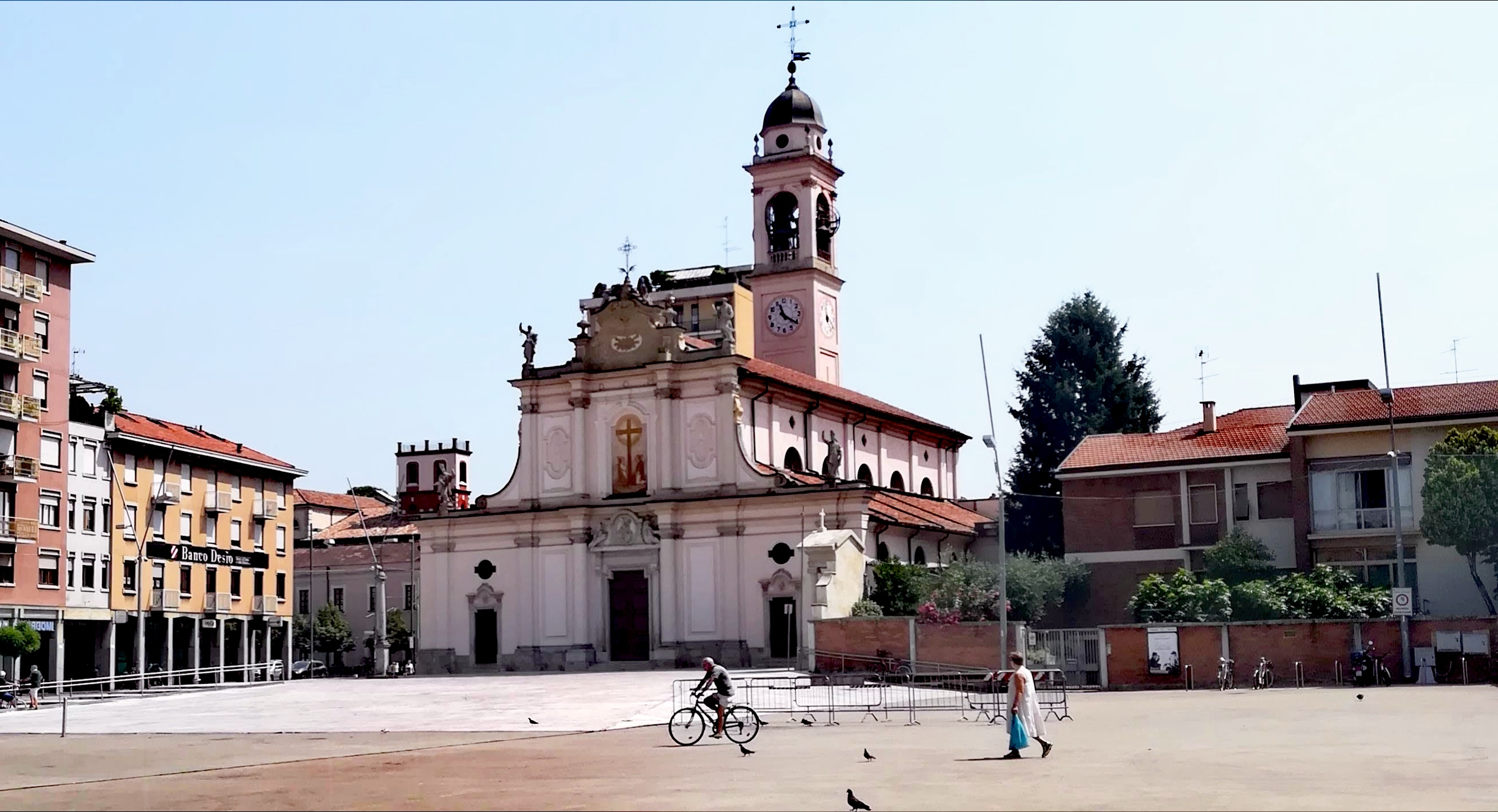
Church of St. Ambrose, Borgo Misto

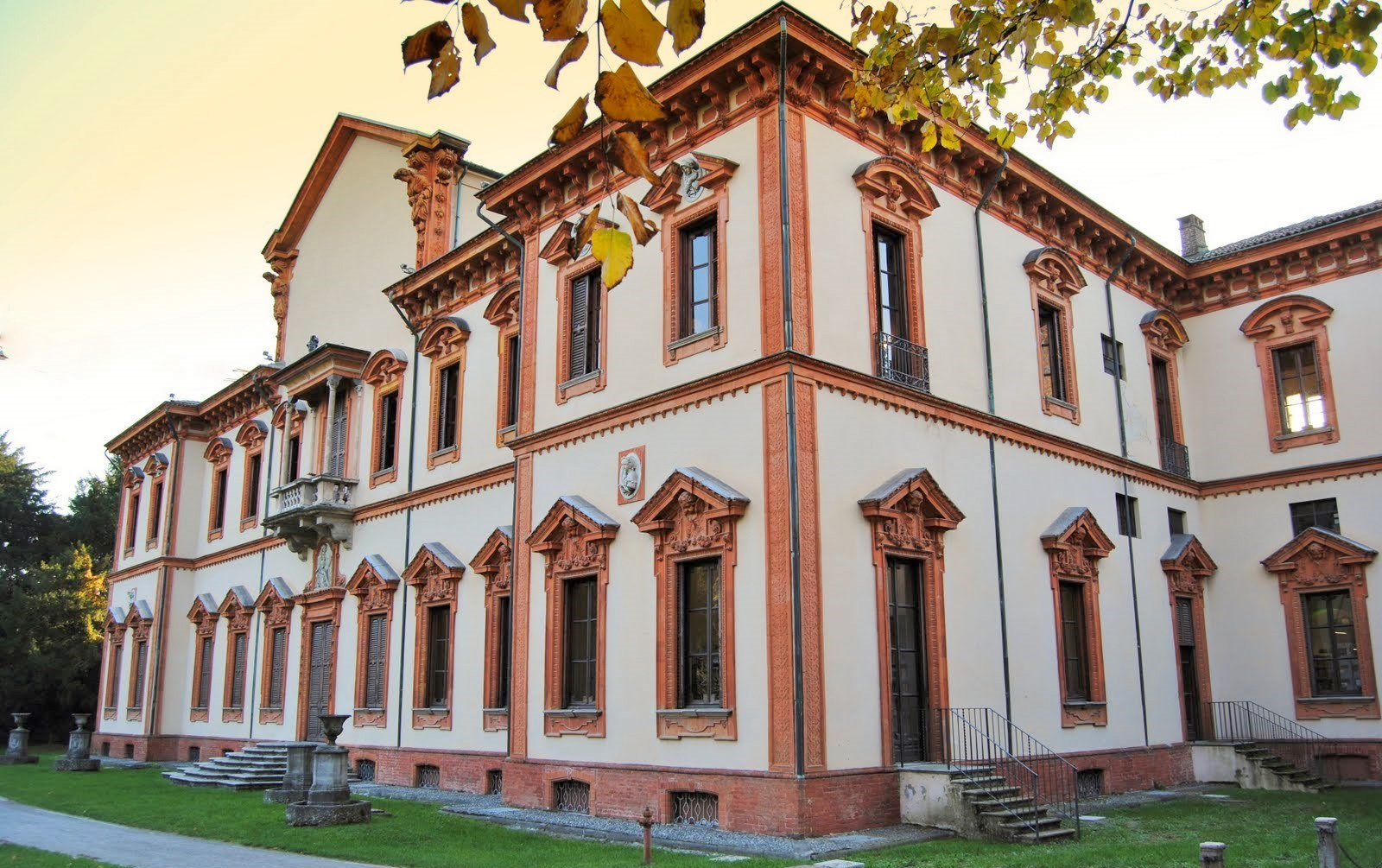
Villa Ghirlanda

- Church of Sant'Ambrogio (17th century) in Cinisello
- Small church of Sant'Eusebio, dating from Lombard times
- Shrine of St. Martin Bishop (16th century)
- Church of San Martino (16th century) in Balsamo
- Villa Ghirlanda Silva Cipelletti (16th century) with one of the first Landscape garden in Italy, designed by count Ercole Silva in the early of 19th century
- Piazza Gramsci, the main square of Cinisello, overlooked by the Church of Sant'Ambrogio and Villa Arconati
- Church of Saint Pio X (1958)
- Church of Saint Joseph worker (1957)
- Church of Saint Peter (1968)
- Church of Sacred Family (1965)
- Church of Santa Margherita (1961)
- Church of San Bernardino

== Notable people ==
- Carino of Balsamo (? – 1293), beatified Dominican lay brother
- Carlo Oriani (1888), cyclist
- Valerio Ruggeri (1934), voice actor
- Ernesto Castano (1939), footballer
- Pierino Prati (1946), footballer and coach
- Gaetano Scirea (1953), footballer and coach
- Marco Veronese (1976), footballer and coach
- Roberto Cammarelle (1980), boxer
- Sfera Ebbasta (1992), rapper
- PANDA BOI, Internet personality

== Twin towns – sister cities ==
Cinisello Balsamo is twinned with:

- Mazzarino, Italy

== See also ==
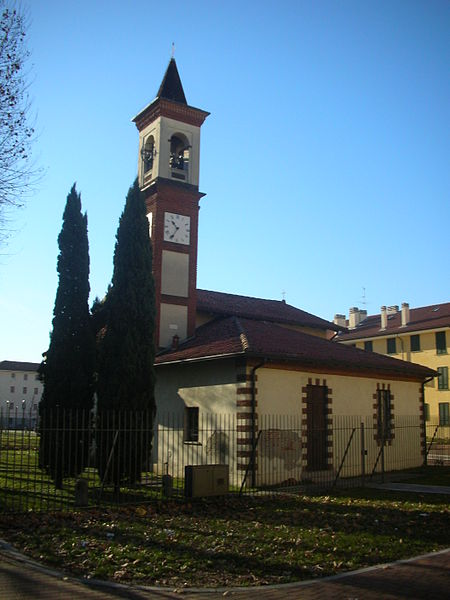
Church of Saint Eusebio

- Borgo Misto
- Crocetta (Cinisello Balsamo)
- Villa Rachele
- SS36
- Province of Milan
- Lombardy
- Lombards
- Sanctuary of San Martino
- Church of San Martino (Cinisello Balsamo)
