= Andy Burgess (artist) =

British artist (born 1969)

- Born: 1969 (age 56–57); London
- Education: University of Leeds 1991; Byam Shaw School of Art 1996
- Website: https://www.andyburgessart.com/

Andy Burgess (born 1969) is a British artist based in Tucson, Arizona. He is best known for his abstract depiction of modernist architecture, in particular for mid-century modern homes. Likened to David Hockney, Burgess describes his style as "Pop Geometry".

Burgess has exhibited at the Tucson Museum of Art, University of Arizona Museum of Art, the Cynthia Corbett Gallery in London, Tandem Press in Wisconsin, the Bonner David Galleries in Scottsdale, Arizona, and the Etherton Gallery in Tucson. Burgess's known collectors include Kazuo Ishiguro and Emma Thompson.

== Early life ==
Burgess was born and raised in London, England. He is the son of actor John Burgess and Lana Burgess. Burgess originally studied Politics at the University of Leeds, and interned for Labour Party member Jack Straw, but in the last year of his studies he took night drawing classes at Jacob Kramer College. Burgess subsequently studied Fine Art at the Byam Shaw School of Art, London

== Work ==
Burgess cites artists including Piet Mondrian, Stuart Davis, Richard Diebenkorn, David Hockney, Kurt Schwitters, and Edward Hopper as influences. The paintings Burgess made in London typically depicted city scenes.

Burgess moved from London to Tucson, Arizona, in 2009, where his brother lived. Burgess then started to focus more on painting mid-century Modern architecture. Buildings by architects Pierre Koenig, William Krisel, and Donald Wexler have been the subject of Burgess's art. Burgess has stated that he is not interested in photorealism.

In 2016, Burgess was invited to collaborate with printmakers from the Tandem Press, Madison, Wisconsin. During his residencies at Tandem, Burgess produced lithographs, collages, relief prints, and etchings. In 2021, Burgess began work on a series of artworks for the Chelsea and Westminster Hospital, London as a part of the Arts in Health program run by CW+.

=== Collages ===
In his collages, he uses vintage ephemera, including 1930s to 1940s matchbooks, ticket stubs, and advertising, many featuring midcentury typography. The collages often represent city skylines. His collages are inspired by Kurt Schwitters, Sonia Delaunay, and Russian constructivism. In March 2018, Burgess presented cubist collages at the Etherton Gallery in Tucson.

=== Photography ===
Burgess is also a photographer. His work is published by Grand Image in Seattle and Rosenstiels in the UK.

== Solo exhibitions ==
- 2020 – Bonner David Galleries, Scottsdale, Arizona
- 2018 – Bonner David Galleries, Scottsdale, Arizona
- 2018 – Tucson Historic Preservation Foundation, Tucson, Arizona
- 2018 – Tucson Museum of Art, Tuson, Arizona
- 2016 – Sue Greenwood Fine Art, Laguna Beach, California
- 2014 – The Cynthia Corbett Gallery, New York
- 2013 – Andrea Schwartz Gallery, San Francisco, California
- 2013 – University of Arizona Museum of Art
- 2012 – Sue Greenwood Fine Art, Laguna Beach, California
- 2012 – Tory Folliard Gallery, Milwaukee, Wisconsin
- 2010 – Eric Firestone Gallery, Tucson, Arizona
- 2009 – The Cynthia Corbett Gallery, London
- 2008 – Clifton Interiors, London
- 2005 – The Cynthia Corbett Gallery, London
- 2003 – Gavin Graham Gallery, London, United Kingdom.
- 2001 – Gallery 27, London
- 2000 – The Gallery in Cork Street, London
- 1999 – Pryory Art Gallery, London
- 1997 – The Tricycle Gallery, London

== Books ==
- Modernist House Paintings: Andy Burgess, Nazraeli Press, 2018
- Abstract Paintings and Collage: Andy Burgess, Nazraeli Press
- Signs of Nothing: Andy Burgess, Nazraeli Press
