= Borgo Misto =

- Frazione
- Location of Borgo Misto in Italy
- Coordinates: 45°33′N 9°13′E
- Country: Italy
- Region: Lombardy
- Province: Milan (MI)
- Comune: Cinisello Balsamo
- Elevation: 161 m (528 ft)
- Demonym(s): Cinisellesi and Balsamesi
- Time zone: UTC+1 (CET)
  - Summer (DST): UTC+2 (CEST)
- Postal code: 20092
- Dialing code: +39 02
- Patron saint: St. Ambrose
- Saint day: December 7
- Website: Official website

Borgo Misto is a neighbourhood in the northern area of the city of Cinisello Balsamo, in Italy, bordering with the neighbourhood of Sant'Eusebio and with Taccona of Muggiò.

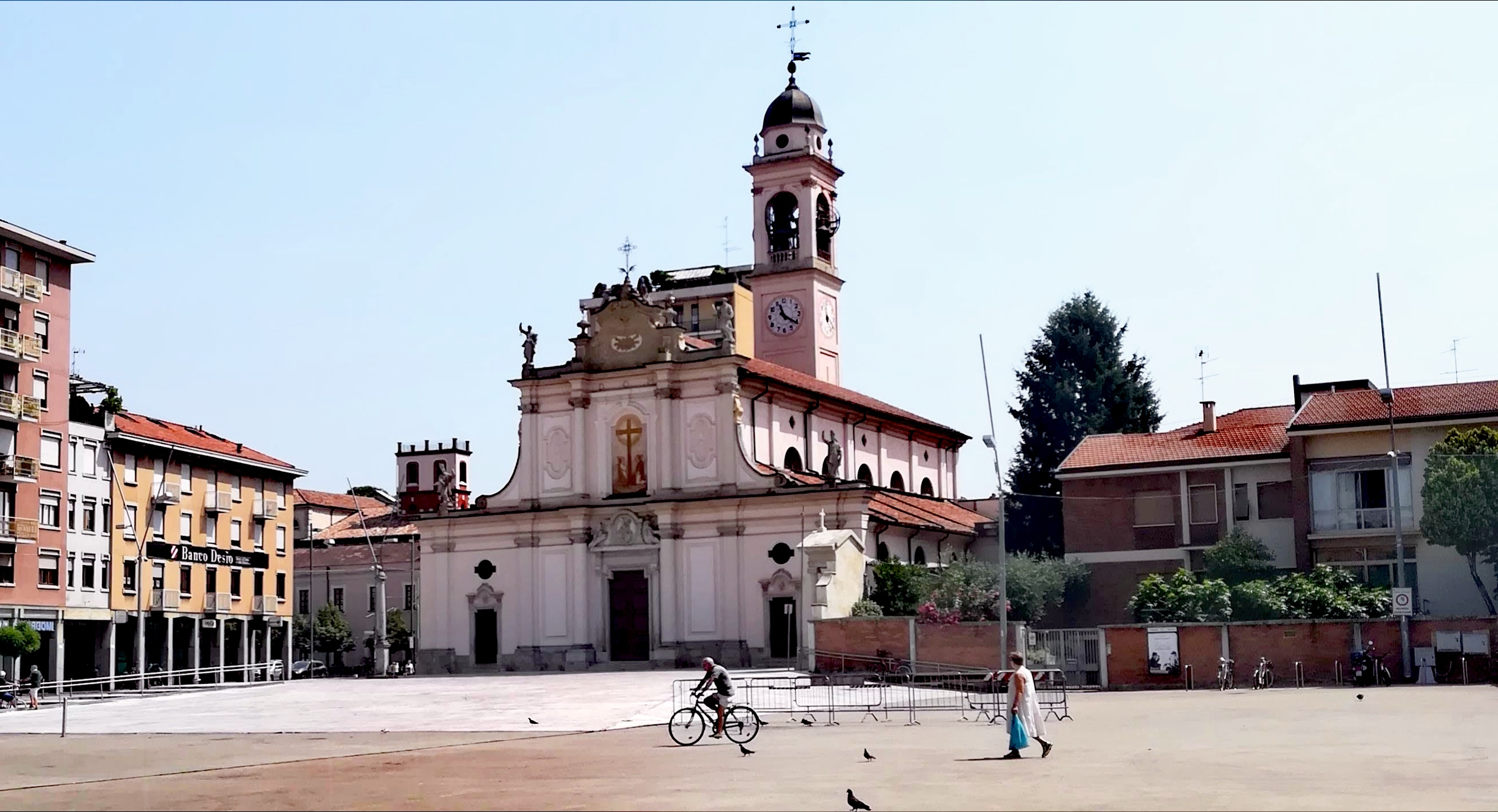
Church of St. Ambrose

The patron saint of the neighborhood is Saint Ambrose, for whom the local church, Chiesa Sant Ambrogio in Italian, is named.

There has been an annual festival in Borgi Misto each October for 12 years, as of 5 October 2025.
