= Mino Caprio =

Italian actor (born 1955)

- Born: Guglielmo Caprio; 17 November 1955 (age 70); Rome, Italy
- Occupations: Actor; voice actor; theatre director; dubbing director
- Years active: 1978–present
- Children: 2

Guglielmo "Mino" Caprio (born 17 November 1955) is an Italian actor and voice actor.

== Biography ==
A former law professor with a degree in Jurisprudence and a theatre actor and director since the mid-'70s, Caprio has often played the part of a priest or professor in his film and television roles. He is typically known for dubbing voices of celebrities and cartoon characters, providing the official Italian dub voice for actors like Martin Short and Mark Williams and characters such as Arthur Weasley in Harry Potter, Peter Griffin in Family Guy, and C-3PO in the Star Wars franchise since 1999. Caprio is also the Italian voice of Kermit the Frog, which he has dubbed in every Muppets movie to date, and the Looney Tunes character Marvin the Martian.

In Italian animation, Caprio voiced the title character and Glycerin in the second season of the TV series Alberto the Wolf (Lupo Alberto), Geppetto in two animated films based on Carlo Collodi's book, Pinocchio, and others.

In 2012, he also took over as the Italian voice of Grandpa Simpson in The Simpsons, as well as Professor Farnsworth in Futurama, replacing Mario Milita and Sergio Graziani respectively.

== Filmography ==
=== Film ===
- What's Your Sign? (2014)
- The Big Score (2016)
- La verità sta in cielo (2016)
- My Family Jumble (it) (2017)
- A.N.I.M.A. (it) (2019)
- Shortcut (2020)
- Roma Blues (2023)

=== Television ===
- Un commissario a Roma - TV series (1993)
- Linda e il brigadiere - TV series (1998)
- A Good Season - TV series (2014)
- May God Help Us - TV series (2014)
- One Step from Heaven - TV series (2019)
- The Ladies' Paradise - TV series (2020)

== Voice work ==
=== Animation ===
- Bentornato Pinocchio and Pinocchio (2012 film) - Geppetto
- Alberto the Wolf (season 2) - Alberto the Wolf, Glycerin
- L'eroe dei due mondi - Radetzky
- Johan Padan a la descoverta de le Americhe - Governatore Ramiro Mendez
- Winx Club (seasons 1-5) - Wizgiz
- Chi ha paura?... - Drake
- Teen Days - Giovanni
- 00 - Zero Zero - Il papà
- Treasure Island (2015 TV series) - Squire Trelawney
- Acid Space - Barman
- The Bears' Famous Invasion of Sicily - Maître Bear

==== Italian-dubbed animated roles ====
- Kermit the Frog in The Muppet Movie, The Muppet Christmas Carol, Muppet Treasure Island, The Great Muppet Caper, Muppets From Space, Kermit's Swamp Years, It's a Very Merry Muppet Christmas Movie, The Muppets' Wizard of Oz, The Muppets, Muppets Most Wanted, Muppet Show (2007 and 2021 redubs), Muppet Babies (2018 TV series)
- C-3PO in Star Wars: Clone Wars, Star Wars: The Clone Wars - The Movie, Star Wars: The Clone Wars, Star Wars Rebels, Star Wars Forces of Destiny, in Star Wars Resistance
- Marvin the Martian and Barnyard Dawg in The Looney Tunes Show; Marvin the Martian in Looney Tunes: Rabbits Run, Space Jam: A New Legacy, New Looney Tunes, Looney Tunes Cartoons, Bugs Bunny Builders
- Petrie in The Land Before Time II: The Great Valley Adventure, The Land Before Time III: The Time of the Great Giving, The Land Before Time IV: Journey Through the Mists, The Land Before Time V: The Mysterious Island, The Land Before Time VI: The Secret of Saurus Rock
- Pleakley in Lilo & Stitch, Stitch! The Movie, Lilo & Stitch 2: Stitch Has a Glitch, Leroy & Stitch, Lilo & Stitch: The Series
- Myōga in Inuyasha, Inuyasha: The Final Act, Inuyasha the Movie: Affections Touching Across Time, Inuyasha the Movie: The Castle Beyond the Looking Glass, Inuyasha the Movie: Swords of an Honorable Ruler
- Various characters in Lupin the 3rd Part III, Urusei Yatsura (1st Italian dub), Looney Tunes and Merrie Melodies (1995 and 1999 Italian redubs), South Park (1st Italian dub)
- Puffin in The Swan Princess, The Swan Princess: Escape from Castle Mountain, The Swan Princess III: The Mystery of the Enchanted Treasure
- Griffin the Invisible Man in Hotel Transylvania, Hotel Transylvania 2, in Hotel Transylvania 3: Summer Vacation
- Pain in Hercules (1998 TV series) and Disney's House of Mouse
- Wheezy in Toy Story 2, Buzz Lightyear of Star Command: The Adventure Begins
- Peter Griffin, Nate Griffin, Mickey McFinnegan, Kermit the Frog, Chip, Retep, Abraham Simpson and Woody Allen (season 16) in Family Guy
- Moe Syszlak (season 1-7), Grampa Simpson (season 23 and on), Homer Simpson (season 23, singing parts), Professor Farnsworth (episode 26x6), narrator (episode 32x11) and Joseph Stalin in The Simpsons
- Flaps, Sheriff of Nottingham and White Rabbit in Disney's House of Mouse
- Evil Wizard, Santa Claus and Cheesepuff Mike in Uncle Grandpa
- Bob Cratchit and Belinda Cratchit in The Muppet Christmas Carol
- Richard Watterson and various characters in The Amazing World of Gumball
- Pesto and Sherlock Holmes in Animaniacs
- Mugsy and TV host in The Looney Looney Looney Bugs Bunny Movie (1999 Italian redub)
- Jeweler and Butch in Tom and Jerry: The Magic Ring
- Ogden Wernstrom (seasons 1-5) and Professor Farnsworth (seasons 6-7) in Futurama
- Smokey and Steamer in The Polar Express
- Merchant in Aladdin
- Boomhauer in King of the Hill
- Grandpa Pig in Peppa Pig
- Flem in Cow and Chicken
- Cyborg in Teen Titans Go!
- Professor Zündapp in Cars 2
- Abe the Anteater in The Caribou Kitchen
- Bob Belcher in Bob's Burgers (season 10 onwards)
- Tutter in Bear in the Big Blue House
- Brain in Igor
- Principal Purdy in Mr. Peabody & Sherman
- Lars in 101 Dalmatians II: Patch's London Adventure
- Carl Murphy in Monsters vs. Aliens
- Larry in The Wild
- Vinnie Raton in ChalkZone
- Pickall in Eleanor's Secret
- Xolal in Mune: Guardian of the Moon

=== Live action voice roles ===
- The Dragon Ring - TV miniseries - Sorriso
- Italian Restaurant - TV film - Radio
- Italiani nello Spazio - Cook 9000
- Subiaco. Una storia da raccontare - Documentary - Abbot voice
- Gesù di Nazareth - documentary (2012) - Voice-over
- Il dominio della lacrima - Juan Dorian Miller
- SPQR - documentary - Pasquino
- Un Natale a casa Croce - documentary (2024) - Narrator
- Nato il sei ottobre - TV film (2024) - Narrator

==== Italian-dubbed live action roles ====
- Arthur Weasley in Harry Potter and the Philosopher's Stone, Harry Potter and the Chamber of Secrets, Harry Potter and the Prisoner of Azkaban, Harry Potter and the Goblet of Fire, Harry Potter and the Order of the Phoenix, Harry Potter and the Half-Blood Prince, Harry Potter and the Deathly Hallows – Part 1, Harry Potter and the Deathly Hallows – Part 2
- C-3PO in Star Wars: Episode I – The Phantom Menace, Star Wars: Episode II – Attack of the Clones, Star Wars: Episode III – Revenge of the Sith, Star Wars: Episode VII – The Force Awakens, Star Wars: Episode VIII – The Last Jedi, Star Wars: Episode IX – The Rise of Skywalker, Rogue One: A Star Wars Story
- Yin Yang in The Expendables, The Expendables 2, The Expendables 3
- Franck Eggelhoffer in Father of the Bride, Father of the Bride Part II
- Marv Merchants in Home Alone, Home Alone 2: Lost in New York
- Ted in Ted, Ted 2
- Various roles in Friends
- Thimbletack in The Spiderwick Chronicles
- Jack Frost in The Santa Clause 3: The Escape Clause
- Ned Perry in Three Fugitives
- Martin Harvey in Captain Ron
- Richard Kempster in Jungle 2 Jungle
- Lionel Dillard in Mumford
- Rudy Blatnoyd in Inherent Vice
- Albert Stark in A Million Ways to Die in the West
- Robert Romano in ER
- Rom in Star Trek: Deep Space Nine
- Crazy Carl in Sonic the Hedgehog
- Pachacamac in Knuckles
