= Dijana Pavlović =

Serbo-Italian actress (born 1976)

Dijana Pavlović (Serbian Cyrillic: Дијана Павловић; born 11 November 1976) is a Serbian Romani activist and actress.

== Career ==
Pavlović helped form the Romani people official football team.
