= Nip/Tuck season 5 =

2007–2009 season of American tv series

Nip/Tuck
- Season 5
- DVD cover for Part 1 (left) and Part 2
- No. of episodes: 22

Release
- Original network: FX
- Original release: October 30, 2007 – March 3, 2009

Season chronology
- ← Previous; Season 4 Next → Season 6

The fifth season of Nip/Tuck premiered on October 30, 2007 and concluded on March 3, 2009. The unusually lengthy interval, for this season, was a direct result of the 2007–2008 Writers Guild of America strike. The season consisted of 22 episodes.

== Cast and characters ==
=== Main cast ===
- Dylan Walsh as Dr. Sean McNamara
- Julian McMahon as Dr. Christian Troy
- John Hensley as Matt McNamara
- Roma Maffia as Liz Cruz
- Kelly Carlson as Kimber Henry
- Joely Richardson as Julia McNamara

=== Special guest stars ===
- Oliver Platt as Freddy Prune
- Craig Bierko as Bob Easton
- Jennifer Coolidge as Candy Richards
- Bradley Cooper as Aidan Stone
- Daphne Zuniga as Carly Summers
- Rosie O'Donnell as Dawn Budge
- Jessalyn Gilsig as Gina Russo
- Sharon Gless as Colleen Rose
- Joan Van Ark as Annette Wainwright
- Shari Belafonte as Catherine Wicke
- Deborah Shelton as Marla Middleton
- Morgan Fairchild as herself

=== Recurring cast ===
- Portia de Rossi as Olivia Lord
- Paula Marshall as Kate Tinsley
- Lauren Hutton as Fiona McNeil
- Kelsey Lynn Batelaan as Annie McNamara
- AnnaLynne McCord as Eden Lord
- John Schneider as Ram Peters
- Leslie Grossman as Bliss Berger
- Maggie Siff as Rachel Ben Natan
- Donna Mills as Lulu Grandiron
- Jeannine Kaspar as Emme Lowell
- Lisa Darr as Darlene Lowell
- Adhir Kalyan as Dr. Raj Paresh
- Damien Leake as Dr. Moss
- Jaime Ray Newman as Daphne Pendell
- Katee Sackhoff as Dr. Theodora Rowe
- Elaine Hausman as Allegra Caldarello
- Richard Portnow as Manny Caldarello

== Episodes ==
No. overall	No. in season	Title	Directed by	Written by	Patient portrayer	Original release date	Prod. code	Viewers (millions)
Part 1
60	1	"Carly Summers"	Charles Haid	Ryan Murphy	Daphne Zuniga	October 30, 2007	3T6401	4.34
In the fifth season premiere, Sean and Christian settle into their new plastic surgery practice in Beverly Hills and struggle to build it from the ground up.
61	2	"Joyce & Sharon Monroe"	Charles Haid	Ryan Murphy	Susan Griffiths & Merilee Brasch	November 6, 2007	3T6402	3.33
Sean and Christian learn about the glamorous side of fame and the price that people are willing to pay for it.
62	3	"Everett Poe"	Richard Levine	Lyn Greene & Richard Levine	Michael Des Barres	November 13, 2007	3T6403	3.56
Sean and Julia learn more about their family dynamics as Sean resists Eden Lord's advances.
63	4	"Dawn Budge II"	Charles Haid	Jennifer Salt	Rosie O'Donnell	November 20, 2007	3T6404	3.21
A series of unfortunate events unfold for an unlucky Dawn Budge, who seeks reparative surgery from Sean and Christian.
64	5	"Chaz Darling"	Sean Jablonski	Sean Jablonski	Jai Rodriguez	November 27, 2007	3T6405	3.40
While a patient inspires Sean to take his relationship with Kate in a new direction, Eden uses extreme methods to persuade Christian to perform surgery on a friend.
65	6	"Damien Sands"	Charles Haid	Hank Chilton	Ian Buchanan	December 4, 2007	3T6406	2.49
Christian, jealous over Sean's newfound fame, convinces Sean to tape a reality show based on their careers as plastic surgeons, with disastrous results. This episode is a satire of reality television.
66	7	"Dr. Joshua Lee"	Brad Falchuk	Brad Falchuk	George Coe	December 11, 2007	3T6407	2.52
As Sean tries to regain his youth through his relationship with Eden, a violent and traumatic event causes Julia to question her relationship with Olivia.
67	8	"Duke Collins"	Elodie Keene	Lyn Greene & Richard Levine	Joel McKinnon Miller	December 18, 2007	3T6408	1.94
After suspecting that something more than just their Secret Santa game is going on, Sean confronts Christian and Julia about the secret they have been keeping.
68	9	"Rachel Ben Natan"	Charles Haid	Jennifer Salt	Maggie Siff	January 15, 2008	3T6409	2.19
As Julia's health worsens, Christian falls back into old habits. Sean hires Gina as the new McNamara/Troy receptionist in order to get back at Christian.
69	10	"Magda & Jeff"	Craig Zisk	Hank Chilton	Selma Stern & Robert Gant	January 22, 2008	3T6410	2.84
After Sean takes on an agent, his role on "Hearts 'n Scalpels" is expanded. Meanwhile, a suspicious Christian questions why Gina moved to Los Angeles and is working at McNamara/Troy, and what her motives might be.
70	11	"Kyle Ainge"	Dirk Wallace Craft	Brad Falchuk & Hank Chilton	Jeff Hephner	January 29, 2008	3T6411	2.89
Christian attempts to cope in the aftermath of a death. Meanwhile, Colleen feels threatened when another talent agency shows interest in Sean's acting career.
71	12	"Lulu Grandiron"	Brad Falchuk	Brad Falchuk	Donna Mills	February 5, 2008	3T6412	3.34
Eden looks to Sean for help after getting into business with Kimber and Ram.
72	13	"August Walden"	Sean Jablonski	Sean Jablonski	Stephen J. Oliver	February 12, 2008	3T6413	2.71
A television critic gives Sean a dose of the ugly side of Hollywood.
73	14	"Candy Richards"	Richard Levine	Jennifer Salt	Jennifer Coolidge	February 19, 2008	3T6414	2.98
Tragedy strikes the McNamara/Troy family after Julia learns what has caused her ill health.
Part 2
74	15	"Ronnie Chase"	Brad Falchuk	Ryan Murphy	Michael Scheckenowitz	January 6, 2009	3T6415	3.12
As season five continues, McNamara/Troy faces an unexpected, serious medical crisis. Christian decides to settle down with one woman and Sean discovers a new love in a moment of extreme vulnerability. In the premiere episode for this second segment of season five, Sean's physical and emotional well-being is greatly impacted after he survives the attack from Colleen. Meanwhile, Christian gets some troubling news.
75	16	"Gene Shelly"	Richard Levine	Lyn Greene & Richard Levine	John Fleck	January 13, 2009	3T6416	2.53
Christian and Liz grow closer when his chemotherapy makes him ill and she becomes his caretaker. Sean reconnects with his broken family.
76	17	"Roxy St. James"	Lyn Greene	Jennifer Salt	Dina Meyer	January 27, 2009	3T6417	2.68
Sean tries to deal with his feelings for Julia. Christian meets someone who gets what he is going through.
77	18	"Ricky Wells"	John Stuart Scott	Brad Falchuk	Brando Eaton	February 3, 2009	3T6418	2.70
Matt gets jealous when Sean and Raj starts to develop a father/son relationship. Christian and Liz try making things work.
78	19	"Manny Skerritt"	Dirk Wallace Craft	Ryan Murphy	Misha Collins	February 10, 2009	3T6419	2.33
Sean's hiring of a new anesthesiologist leads to trouble. Kimber goes to extreme measures.
79	20	"Budi Sabri"	Hank Chilton	Ryan Murphy & Hank Chilton	Chi Muoi Lo	February 17, 2009	3T6420	2.40
Sean and Teddy explore their relationship and Christian relates to a patient with a unique condition.
80	21	"Allegra Calderella"	Sean Jablonski	Sean Jablonski	Elaine Hausman	February 24, 2009	3T6421	2.10
Christian makes arrangements to secure his family's future after he's gone. Liz prepares for the wedding.
81	22	"Giselle Blaylock & Legend Chandler"	Lyn Greene	Lyn Greene & Richard Levine	Wendy Glenn & Graham Shiels	March 3, 2009	3T6422	2.39
Christian searches for immortality and Kimber reacts to the news of Liz and Christian getting married.

== U.S television ratings ==
Season	Season premiere			Season finale			Viewers total (in millions)	Viewers age 18–49 (in millions)
Season	Date	Viewers total (in millions)	Viewers 18–49 (in millions)	Date	Viewers total (in millions)	Viewers 18–49 (in millions)	Viewers total (in millions)	Viewers age 18–49 (in millions)
5th – Part I	October 30, 2007	4.3	3.5	February 19, 2008	???	2.41	???	???
5th – Part II	January 6, 2009	3.1	2.4	March 3, 2009	3.8	2.4	?	?

== Reception ==
The fifth season received very positive reviews from critics, holding a 87% fresh rating on Rotten Tomatoes, the highest-rated series of the show on the site. It was praised for its use of humour, with Matthew Gilbert of The Boston Globe writing "The plastic-surgery drama just keeps on spinning smart, tart, funny, tragic, sexy, grotesque tales about vanity and contemporary American life", whilst Charlie McCollum of the San Jose Mercury News wrote, "The shift in setting has resulted in opening episodes that are so wickedly funny and energetic that Nip/Tuck seems like a whole new show – or at least one that has recaptured its past glory." Ryan Murphy received praise for the show's change of location from Miami to Los Angeles, with Mary McNamara of the Los Angeles Times writing "Ten minutes into the season premiere of Nip/Tuck and you have to wonder what those deeply disturbed plastic surgeons were doing wasting four seasons, and all that unexplored sexual tension, in Miami when they so clearly belong in Los Angeles", whilst Brian Lowry wrote for Variety that "A change of venue has helped Nip/Tuck get much of its mojo back." Rick Porter, at Zap2it, wrote "The actors are relishing the change of scenery and all that it brings, and [Ryan] Murphy himself seems more engaged as well." Some criticism was aimed at the show s continued use of sexual content, with Ginia Bellafante of The New York Times writing "For four seasons Nip/Tuck danced around the idea that sex creepily ought to stay within the province of family life's pre-existing perversions; now it is saying so more directly, and with home-baked fruitcake."
