= Nip/Tuck season 4 =

2006 season of American tv series

Nip/Tuck
- Season 4
- DVD cover
- No. of episodes: 15

Release
- Original network: FX
- Original release: September 5 – December 12, 2006

Season chronology
- ← Previous; Season 3 Next → Season 5

The fourth season of Nip/Tuck premiered on September 5, 2006 and concluded on December 12, 2006. It consisted of 15 episodes.

== Cast and characters ==
=== Main cast ===
- Dylan Walsh as Dr. Sean McNamara
- Julian McMahon as Dr. Christian Troy
- John Hensley as Matt McNamara
- Roma Maffia as Liz Cruz
- Kelly Carlson as Kimber Henry
- Joely Richardson as Julia McNamara

=== Special guest stars ===
- Kathleen Turner as Cindy Plumb
- Brooke Shields as Dr. Faith Wolper
- Sanaa Lathan as Michelle Landau
- Larry Hagman as Burt Landau
- Jacqueline Bisset as James LeBeau
- Peter Dinklage as Marlowe Sawyer
- Rosie O'Donnell as Dawn Budge
- Mo'Nique as Evetta Washington
- Alanis Morissette as Poppy
- Catherine Deneuve as Diana Lubey
- Brenda Vaccaro as Beatrice Madsen
- Jessalyn Gilsig as Gina Russo
- Natasha Alam as Analise

=== Recurring cast ===
- Colleen Flynn as Dr. Allamby
- Kelsey Lynn Batelaan as Annie McNamara
- Jennifer Hall as Monica Wilder
- Mario Lopez as Dr. Mike Hamoui
- Robert LaSardo as Escobar Gallardo
- Julie Warner as Megan O'Hara
- Meera Simhan as Dr. Meera Muthara
- Adria Dawn as Parker
- Ruth Williamson as Hedda Grubman
- Jack Yang as Chiyo
- Raymond Cruz as Alejandro Perez
- Joey Slotnick as Dr. Merril Bobolit
- Rebecca Gayheart as Natasha Charles
- Rebecca Metz as Abby Mays

== Episodes ==
No. overall	No. in season	Title	Directed by	Written by	Patient portrayer	Original release date	Prod. code	Viewers (millions)
45	1	"Cindy Plumb"	Ryan Murphy	Ryan Murphy	Kathleen Turner	September 5, 2006	3T5001	4.86
Sean and Christian celebrate a milestone surgery and receive an interesting proposition from patient Burt Landau, a wealthy medical venture capitalist who wants bigger testicular implants and his much younger wife, Michelle. Julia reveals devastating news about her unborn child to Sean, leaving him full of fear and doubt. Phone sex operator Cindy Plumb requests that the surgeons make her voice more youthful. Christian redecorates his apartment after a troubling appointment with his psychiatrist, Dr. Faith Wolper.
46	2	"Blu Mondae"	Michael M. Robin	Lyn Greene & Richard Levine	Angela Little	September 12, 2006	3T5002	3.86
Sean and Julia make an important decision about their unborn baby. After getting into trouble with their new boss, Sean and Christian discover the drawbacks of no longer owning their practice. Matt's decision to go down a new path in life is met with uncertainty by his family. An aristocratic gay man, Arthur Stiles, wants his younger lover to look as distinguished as he does. James, a woman who has a mysterious past with Michelle, arrives.
47	3	"Monica Wilder"	Elodie Keene	Brad Falchuk	Jennifer Hall	September 19, 2006	3T5003	3.45
While Sean searches for a night nurse for his newborn baby, Conor, Sean's hidden desires are revealed. He turns to Christian for support but Christian's vanity causes him to be unavailable at the most crucial time. Sean and Julia eventually hire Marlowe Sawyer to help care for Conor. Liz witnesses an event that changes her relationship with Michelle.
48	4	"Shari Noble"	Nelson McCormick	Jennifer Salt	Melissa Gilbert	September 26, 2006	3T5004	3.92
The more Michelle resists Christian, the more he wants her. If Michelle's past is any indication, she has a lot to lose. Sean's worries about Julia and the baby lead him into a compromising situation. A patient named Shari Noble needs her nipple reattached after an accident. When Christian accompanies Liz to a lesbian bar, it becomes a night she will regret for the rest of her life.
49	5	"Dawn Budge"	Elodie Keene	Hank Chilton	Rosie O'Donnell	October 3, 2006	3T5005	3.34
Christian earns a fortune from a rags-to-riches client, Dawn Budge, outside of McNamara/Troy, when she requests surgical makeovers for her family. Christian continues longing for what he does not have, an honest and loving relationship. James blackmails Christian while forcing a terrified Michelle to remember her past actions. Sean makes Julia a very romantic offer. Kimber convinces Matt to move out of his parents' house.
50	6	"Faith Wolper, Ph.D"	Sean Jablonski	Sean Jablonski	Brooke Shields	October 10, 2006	3T5006	3.55
While trying to arrange a second honeymoon with Julia, Sean learns that a nanny the couple had hired, Monica Wilder, has no intention of leaving. Christian's therapist, Dr. Faith Wolper, reveals her obsessive, secret torment as Christian wrestles with his relationship woes. Burt Landau discovers the affair between Michelle and Christian and proposes an unorthodox solution.
51	7	"Burt Landau"	Charles Haid	Brad Falchuk	Larry Hagman	October 17, 2006	3T5007	3.98
Christian has enough of sex with Michelle (Sanaa Lathan) in front of the incapacitated Burt (Larry Hagman), who later suffers a stroke. Desperate for companionship, Christian manipulates a fragile Kimber into sleeping with him. Liz is told she requires a kidney transplant but Sean has concerns over donating one, despite being a match. Matt comes on to Kimber. Newly divorced Dawn Budge (guest star Rosie O'Donnell) has an ear torn off by thieves and requires a replacement. Guest starring Stephen Spinella.
52	8	"Conor McNamara"	Patrick McKee	Jennifer Salt & Hank Chilton	Spencer Roberts	October 24, 2006	3T5008	3.26
Sean prepares for Conor's surgery, while having flashbacks to his childhood, scarred by a physical deformity. Julia has last-minute fears of having her son undergo surgery and finally acts on her unexpected attraction to Marlowe (Peter Dinklage). Mrs Grubman (guest star Ruth Williamson) is dying, and requests surgery to leave a good-looking corpse. Guest starring Mo'Nique and Burt Bacharach.
53	9	"Liz Cruz"	Richard Levine	Lyn Greene & Richard Levine	Roma Maffia	October 31, 2006	3T5009	3.27
Liz requests liposuction after feeling out of shape next to her new fitness-obsessed girlfriend Poppy (guest star Alanis Morissette). Julia and Marlowe (Peter Dinklage) act on their feelings for one another and Marlowe later requests a leg-lengthening procedure to make them look more like an ordinary couple. James (Jacqueline Bisset) is threatened by her bosses into getting hold of another kidney and sets her sights on Christian. Guest starring Sanaa Lathan.
54	10	"Merrill Bobolit"	Charles Haid	Sean Jablonski & Brad Falchuk	Joey Slotnick	November 7, 2006	3T5010	3.91
Sean tries to remove any trace of Marlowe (Peter Dinklage) from the McNamara home after discovering Julia's affair. Matt and Kimber reveal that they are married and expecting a baby. Christian doesn't trust Kimber and secretly performs a DNA test to prove the baby is his. Merrill Bobolit returns, requesting anal surgery after being repeatedly raped in prison by his cellmate "husband", Escobar Gallardo (Robert LaSardo). Later, Escobar requests Sean and Christian give him back his old face.
55	11	"Conor McNamara, 2026"	Craig Zisk	Ryan Murphy	Stark Sands	November 14, 2006	3T5011	3.47
In the year 2026, the adult Conor attempts to mend his emotional wounds via a gathering of his entire family. The adult Annie remains tormented by her upbringing. In the present day, Julia accepts the fact that happiness means being on her own as she departs Miami for New York with her two children, leaving Sean and Christian behind for good.
56	12	"Diana Lubey"	Charles Haid	Sean Jablonski	Catherine Deneuve	November 21, 2006	3T5012	3.30
Suffering from loneliness, Sean sympathizes with a forlorn client, Diana Lubey and agrees to her perverse plastic surgery request. Christian proposes marriage to Michelle but his promiscuous past causes him to question his ability to make a long-term commitment to any woman. James concocts a plan to use McNamara/Troy's operating room for her benefit.
57	13	"Reefer"	Lyn Greene	Lyn Greene & Richard Levine	Charles Haid	November 28, 2006	3T5013	3.02
As Sean celebrates Christmas without his family, his loneliness leads him to seek solace in alcohol - resulting in possible legal action from a patient. Meanwhile, Christian receives an unexpected gift when Wilber, who is now 3 years old, comes back into his life. And taking drastic measures to fill her holiday kidney quota, James forces Michelle to help.
58	14	"Willy Ward"	Michael M. Robin	Jennifer Salt	Ronn Lucas	December 5, 2006	3T5014	2.84
Searching his soul and exasperated by living in Christian's shadow, Sean sells his share of McNamara/Troy to Christian and Michelle. Meanwhile, Gina Russo re-enters Christian's life when she learns that Michelle will become Wilber's adoptive mother. James ends her association with Escobar Gallardo and his organ-heisting ring - and Michelle's nightmare begins. And as Matt attempts to rekindle the fire in his marriage to Kimber, Liz and Poppy come to a relationship crossroads.
59	15	"Gala Gallardo"	Ryan Murphy	Ryan Murphy & Hank Chilton	Idalis DeLeón	December 12, 2006	3T5015	3.38
Escobar Gallardo seeks a cosmetic procedure from Sean and Christian for his wife, Gala, who was brutally attacked by her husband's enemies. Christian and Michelle's future together is threatened when Michelle's violent, dark past is finally exposed. With Julia and her two younger children living in New York, and Matt and Kimber expecting a baby, Sean makes a life-changing decision about his partnership in McNamara/Troy.

== U.S television ratings ==
Season premiere			Season finale			Viewers total (in millions)	Viewers age 18–49 (in millions)
Date	Viewers total (in millions)	Viewers 18–49 (in millions)	Date	Viewers total (in millions)	Viewers 18–49 (in millions)	Viewers total (in millions)	Viewers age 18–49 (in millions)
September 5, 2006	4.8	3.4	December 12, 2006	3.38	2.38	3.9	2.75

== Reception ==
The fourth season received positive reviews from critics, holding a 71% fresh rating on Rotten Tomatoes. Maria Elena Fernandez of the Los Angeles Times wrote "Perhaps the show's continued success can be attributed to its restless energy and how in one hour it offers a taste of several different genres, mixing the real with the outrageous", whilst Brian Lowry wrote for Variety, "As always, the series manages to glorify surface beauty while subjecting society's obsession with it to a harsh glare, holding up the strange cases that waltz in as a mirror to the Sean-Julia-Christian triangle. The dialogue remains biting as well." Maureen Ryan of the Chicago Tribune praised the character development, writing "That sense of saucy transgression married to surprisingly effective character development – the magic formula of the first two seasons – is a bit wobbly this year, but Nip/Tuck is more or less back on track." Some reviews were less favorable, with Joe Reid of The Atlantic writing "This stretch of Nip/Tuck was just uninspired ... [It has] its own urban-legend charm, but all the main characters were seriously spinning their wheels", whilst other critics argued the show did not live up to the quality of previous seasons and criticized many imbued scenes.
