= List of Nip/Tuck episodes =

Nip/Tuck is an American medical drama created by Ryan Murphy, which aired on FX in the United States between 2003 and 2010. The series focuses on "McNamara/Troy", a plastic surgery practice, and follows its founders, Dr. Sean McNamara and Dr. Christian Troy (portrayed by Dylan Walsh and Julian McMahon respectively). Each episode typically involves the cosmetic procedures of one or more patients, and also features the personal and professional lives of its main cast.

The show began in July 2003 and concluded with the end of the sixth season in March 2010. While the show was initially set in Miami, at the end of the fourth season, the practice was relocated to Los Angeles and many of the characters followed. The fifth season premiered on October 30, 2007, though production was affected by the 2007 Writers Strike. Accordingly, the second half of the fifth season was not screened until January 6, 2009, in the U.S.

The series ran for 100 episodes, concluding with the series finale on March 3, 2010. With the exception of the pilot, each episode is named after the character(s) that are scheduled to have plastic surgery.

== Series overview ==
Season	Episodes		Originally released	
Season	Episodes		First released	Last released
1	13		July 22, 2003	October 21, 2003
2	16		June 22, 2004	October 5, 2004
3	15		September 20, 2005	December 20, 2005
4	15		September 5, 2006	December 12, 2006
5	22	14	October 30, 2007	February 19, 2008
5	22	8	January 6, 2009	March 3, 2009
6	19		October 14, 2009	March 3, 2010

== Episodes ==
=== Season 1 (2003) ===
No. overall	No. in season	Title	Directed by	Written by	Patient portrayer	Original release date	Prod. code	Viewers (millions)
1	1	"Pilot"	Ryan Murphy	Ryan Murphy	Geoffrey Rivas	July 22, 2003	475194	3.70
2	2	"Mandi/Randi"	Ryan Murphy	Ryan Murphy	Caitlin & Melinda Dahl	July 29, 2003	176451	3.34
3	3	"Nanette Babcock"	Lawrence Trilling	Ryan Murphy	Lindsay Hollister	August 5, 2003	176452	3.55
4	4	"Sofia Lopez"	Michael M. Robin	Sean Jablonski	Jonathan Del Arco	August 12, 2003	176453	3.35
5	5	"Kurt Dempsey"	Elodie Keene	Lyn Greene & Richard Levine	Vincent Angell	August 19, 2003	176454	2.96
6	6	"Megan O'Hara"	Craig Zisk	Jennifer Salt	Julie Warner	September 2, 2003	176455	3.28
7	7	"Cliff Mantegna"	Scott Brazil	Brad Falchuk	Alex Carter	September 9, 2003	176456	3.32
8	8	"Cara Fitzgerald"	Jamie Babbit	Ryan Murphy	Keri Lynn Pratt	September 16, 2003	176457	3.52
9	9	"Sofia Lopez II"	Nelson McCormick	Sean Jablonski	Jonathan Del Arco	September 23, 2003	176458	3.67
10	10	"Adelle Coffin"	Michael M. Robin	Dell Chandler & Ryan Murphy	Nan Martin	September 30, 2003	176459	3.03
11	11	"Montana/Sassy/Justice"	Michael M. Robin	Lyn Greene & Richard Levine	Cheryl White	October 7, 2003	176460	2.50
12	12	"Antonia Ramos"	Elodie Keene	Jennifer Salt & Brad Falchuk	Marisol Nichols	October 14, 2003	176461	2.92
13	13	"Escobar Gallardo"	Ryan Murphy	Ryan Murphy	Robert LaSardo	October 21, 2003	176462	2.99

=== Season 2 (2004) ===
No. overall	No. in season	Title	Directed by	Written by	Patient portrayer	Original release date	Prod. code	Viewers (millions)
14	1	"Erica Noughton"	Ryan Murphy	Ryan Murphy	Vanessa Redgrave	June 22, 2004	177601	3.81
15	2	"Christian Troy"	Jamie Babbit	Sean Jablonski	Julian McMahon	June 29, 2004	177602	3.17
16	3	"Manya Mabika"	Elodie Keene	Lyn Greene & Richard Levine	Aisha Tyler	July 6, 2004	177603	3.49
17	4	"Mrs. Grubman"	Jamie Babbit	Jennifer Salt	Ruth Williamson	July 13, 2004	177604	3.04
18	5	"Joel Gideon"	Nelson McCormick	Brad Falchuk	Doug Savant	July 20, 2004	177605	3.09
19	6	"Bobbi Broderick"	Michael M. Robin	Lyn Greene & Richard Levine	Jill Clayburgh	July 27, 2004	177606	3.74
20	7	"Naomi Gaines"	Craig Zisk	Sean Jablonski	Leslie Bibb	August 3, 2004	177607	3.80
21	8	"Agatha Ripp"	Michael M. Robin	Ryan Murphy	Sarah Paulson	August 10, 2004	177608	3.88
22	9	"Rose and Raven Rosenberg"	Elodie Keene	Ryan Murphy & Brad Falchuk	Lori and Reba Schappell	August 17, 2004	177609	3.45
23	10	"Kimber Henry"	Nelson McCormick	Jennifer Salt	Kelly Carlson	August 24, 2004	177610	3.73
24	11	"Natasha Charles"	Greer Shephard	Lyn Greene & Richard Levine	Rebecca Gayheart	August 31, 2004	177611	4.30
25	12	"Julia McNamara"	Michael M. Robin	Ryan Murphy & Hank Chilton	Joely Richardson	September 7, 2004	177612	4.15
26	13	"Oona Wentworth"	Scott Brazil	Sean Jablonski & Jennifer Salt	Brooks Almy	September 14, 2004	177613	3.75
27	14	"Trudy Nye"	Elodie Keene	Hank Chilton	Lisa Waltz	September 21, 2004	177614	3.67
28	15	"Sean McNamara"	Michael M. Robin	Brad Falchuk	Dylan Walsh	September 28, 2004	177615	3.85
29	16	"Joan Rivers"	Ryan Murphy	Ryan Murphy	Joan Rivers	October 5, 2004	177616	5.22

=== Season 3 (2005) ===
No. overall	No. in season	Title	Directed by	Written by	Patient portrayer	Original release date	Prod. code	Viewers (millions)
30	1	"Momma Boone"	Elodie Keene	Ryan Murphy	Kathy Lamkin	September 20, 2005	2T5951	5.29
31	2	"Kiki"	Elodie Keene	Lyn Greene & Richard Levine	Kiki (gorilla)	September 27, 2005	2T5952	3.91
32	3	"Derek, Alex, and Gary"	Craig Zisk	Brad Falchuk	Adam Henderson, Aaron Moody and Graham Miller	October 4, 2005	2T5953	3.89
33	4	"Rhea Reynolds"	Greer Shephard	Jennifer Salt	Tara Buck	October 11, 2005	2T5954	3.42
34	5	"Granville Trapp"	Jeremy Podeswa	Sean Jablonski	Erik Passoja	October 18, 2005	2T5955	3.84
35	6	"Frankenlaura"	Michael M. Robin	Hank Chilton	Valentin Siroon	October 25, 2005	2T5956	3.54
36	7	"Ben White"	Jeremy Podeswa	Lyn Greene & Richard Levine	John Billingsley	November 1, 2005	2T5957	3.33
37	8	"Tommy Bolton"	Guy Ferland	Brad Falchuk	Blair Williamson	November 8, 2005	2T5958	3.42
38	9	"Hannah Tedesco"	Michael M. Robin	Sean Jablonski	Uncredited	November 15, 2005	2T5959	2.83
39	10	"Madison Berg"	Greg Yaitanes	Jennifer Salt	Hallee Hirsh	November 22, 2005	2T5960	2.93
40	11	"Abby Mays"	Michael M. Robin	Hank Chilton	Rebecca Metz	November 29, 2005	2T5961	3.48
41	12	"Sal Perri"	David Nutter	Lyn Greene & Richard Levine	Louis Mustillo	December 6, 2005	2T5962	3.00
42	13	"Joy Kringle"	Greer Shephard	Sean Jablonski & Jennifer Salt	Elizabeth Ruscio	December 13, 2005	2T5963	3.30
43	14	"Cherry Peck"	Craig Zisk	Brad Falchuk & Hank Chilton	Willam Belli	December 20, 2005	2T5964	5.68
44	15	"Quentin Costa"	Ryan Murphy	Ryan Murphy	Bruno Campos	December 20, 2005	2T5965	5.68

=== Season 4 (2006) ===
No. overall	No. in season	Title	Directed by	Written by	Patient portrayer	Original release date	Prod. code	Viewers (millions)
45	1	"Cindy Plumb"	Ryan Murphy	Ryan Murphy	Kathleen Turner	September 5, 2006	3T5001	4.86
46	2	"Blu Mondae"	Michael M. Robin	Lyn Greene & Richard Levine	Angela Little	September 12, 2006	3T5002	3.86
47	3	"Monica Wilder"	Elodie Keene	Brad Falchuk	Jennifer Hall	September 19, 2006	3T5003	3.45
48	4	"Shari Noble"	Nelson McCormick	Jennifer Salt	Melissa Gilbert	September 26, 2006	3T5004	3.92
49	5	"Dawn Budge"	Elodie Keene	Hank Chilton	Rosie O'Donnell	October 3, 2006	3T5005	3.34
50	6	"Faith Wolper, Ph.D"	Sean Jablonski	Sean Jablonski	Brooke Shields	October 10, 2006	3T5006	3.55
51	7	"Burt Landau"	Charles Haid	Brad Falchuk	Larry Hagman	October 17, 2006	3T5007	3.98
52	8	"Conor McNamara"	Patrick McKee	Jennifer Salt & Hank Chilton	Spencer Roberts	October 24, 2006	3T5008	3.26
53	9	"Liz Cruz"	Richard Levine	Lyn Greene & Richard Levine	Roma Maffia	October 31, 2006	3T5009	3.27
54	10	"Merrill Bobolit"	Charles Haid	Sean Jablonski & Brad Falchuk	Joey Slotnick	November 7, 2006	3T5010	3.91
55	11	"Conor McNamara, 2026"	Craig Zisk	Ryan Murphy	Stark Sands	November 14, 2006	3T5011	3.47
56	12	"Diana Lubey"	Charles Haid	Sean Jablonski	Catherine Deneuve	November 21, 2006	3T5012	3.30
57	13	"Reefer"	Lyn Greene	Lyn Greene & Richard Levine	Charles Haid	November 28, 2006	3T5013	3.02
58	14	"Willy Ward"	Michael M. Robin	Jennifer Salt	Ronn Lucas	December 5, 2006	3T5014	2.84
59	15	"Gala Gallardo"	Ryan Murphy	Ryan Murphy & Hank Chilton	Idalis DeLeón	December 12, 2006	3T5015	3.38

=== Season 5 (2007–09) ===
No. overall	No. in season	Title	Directed by	Written by	Patient portrayer	Original release date	Prod. code	Viewers (millions)
Part 1
60	1	"Carly Summers"	Charles Haid	Ryan Murphy	Daphne Zuniga	October 30, 2007	3T6401	4.34
61	2	"Joyce & Sharon Monroe"	Charles Haid	Ryan Murphy	Susan Griffiths & Merilee Brasch	November 6, 2007	3T6402	3.33
62	3	"Everett Poe"	Richard Levine	Lyn Greene & Richard Levine	Michael Des Barres	November 13, 2007	3T6403	3.56
63	4	"Dawn Budge II"	Charles Haid	Jennifer Salt	Rosie O'Donnell	November 20, 2007	3T6404	3.21
64	5	"Chaz Darling"	Sean Jablonski	Sean Jablonski	Jai Rodriguez	November 27, 2007	3T6405	3.40
65	6	"Damien Sands"	Charles Haid	Hank Chilton	Ian Buchanan	December 4, 2007	3T6406	2.49
66	7	"Dr. Joshua Lee"	Brad Falchuk	Brad Falchuk	George Coe	December 11, 2007	3T6407	2.52
67	8	"Duke Collins"	Elodie Keene	Lyn Greene & Richard Levine	Joel McKinnon Miller	December 18, 2007	3T6408	1.94
68	9	"Rachel Ben Natan"	Charles Haid	Jennifer Salt	Maggie Siff	January 15, 2008	3T6409	2.19
69	10	"Magda & Jeff"	Craig Zisk	Hank Chilton	Selma Stern & Robert Gant	January 22, 2008	3T6410	2.84
70	11	"Kyle Ainge"	Dirk Wallace Craft	Brad Falchuk & Hank Chilton	Jeff Hephner	January 29, 2008	3T6411	2.89
71	12	"Lulu Grandiron"	Brad Falchuk	Brad Falchuk	Donna Mills	February 5, 2008	3T6412	3.34
72	13	"August Walden"	Sean Jablonski	Sean Jablonski	Stephen J. Oliver	February 12, 2008	3T6413	2.71
73	14	"Candy Richards"	Richard Levine	Jennifer Salt	Jennifer Coolidge	February 19, 2008	3T6414	2.98
Part 2
74	15	"Ronnie Chase"	Brad Falchuk	Ryan Murphy	Michael Scheckenowitz	January 6, 2009	3T6415	3.12
75	16	"Gene Shelly"	Richard Levine	Lyn Greene & Richard Levine	John Fleck	January 13, 2009	3T6416	2.53
76	17	"Roxy St. James"	Lyn Greene	Jennifer Salt	Dina Meyer	January 27, 2009	3T6417	2.68
77	18	"Ricky Wells"	John Stuart Scott	Brad Falchuk	Brando Eaton	February 3, 2009	3T6418	2.70
78	19	"Manny Skerritt"	Dirk Wallace Craft	Ryan Murphy	Misha Collins	February 10, 2009	3T6419	2.33
79	20	"Budi Sabri"	Hank Chilton	Ryan Murphy & Hank Chilton	Chi Muoi Lo	February 17, 2009	3T6420	2.40
80	21	"Allegra Calderella"	Sean Jablonski	Sean Jablonski	Elaine Hausman	February 24, 2009	3T6421	2.10
81	22	"Giselle Blaylock & Legend Chandler"	Lyn Greene	Lyn Greene & Richard Levine	Wendy Glenn & Graham Shiels	March 3, 2009	3T6422	2.39

=== Season 6 (2009–10) ===
No. overall	No. in season	Title	Directed by	Written by	Patient portrayer	Original release date	Prod. code	Viewers (millions)
82	1	"Don Hoberman"	Brad Falchuk	Ryan Murphy	Mark Atteberry	October 14, 2009	3T7901	2.92
83	2	"Enigma"	John Stuart Scott	Lyn Greene & Richard Levine	Parker Croft	October 21, 2009	3T7902	2.23
84	3	"Briggitte Reinholt"	Dirk Craft	Sean Jablonski	Lee Garlington	October 28, 2009	3T7903	2.20
85	4	"Jenny Juggs"	Jesse Bochco	Jennifer Salt	Kiersten Warren	November 4, 2009	3T7904	2.17
86	5	"Abigail Sullivan"	John Stuart Scott	Brad Falchuk	Amy Farrington	November 11, 2009	3T7905	1.75
87	6	"Alexis Stone"	Tim Hunter	Hank Chilton	Candis Cayne	November 18, 2009	3T7906	1.89
88	7	"Alexis Stone II"	John Stuart Scott	Ryan Murphy	Candis Cayne	November 25, 2009	3T7907	1.41
89	8	"Lola Wlodkowski"	Eric Stoltz	Lyn Greene & Richard Levine	Danica Sheridan	December 2, 2009	3T7908	2.41
90	9	"Benny Nilsson"	John Stuart Scott	Sean Jablonski	Luke McClure	December 9, 2009	3T7909	1.75
91	10	"Wesley Clovis"	Tate Donovan	Jennifer Salt	Eric Stonestreet	December 16, 2009	3T7960	2.09
92	11	"Dan Daly"	Elodie Keene	Ryan Murphy	Wayne Pére	January 6, 2010	3T7961	1.71
93	12	"Willow Banks"	Tim Hunter	Brad Falchuk	Mini Andén	January 13, 2010	3T7962	1.96
94	13	"Joel Seabrook"	Tate Donovan	Hank Chilton	Tim Guinee	January 20, 2010	3T7963	1.89
95	14	"Sheila Carlton"	Craig Zisk	Lyn Greene & Richard Levine	Christine Estabrook	January 27, 2010	3T7964	1.81
96	15	"Virginia Hayes"	Hank Chilton	Hank Chilton	Kate Norby	February 3, 2010	3T7965	1.54
97	16	"Dr. Griffin"	Tim Hunter	Jennifer Salt	Daniel Benzali	February 10, 2010	3T7967	1.73
98	17	"Christian Troy II"	Diana Valentine	Sean Jablonski	Julian McMahon	February 17, 2010	3T7966	1.49
99	18	"Walter & Edith Krieger"	Dirk Craft	Brad Falchuk	Harold Gould & Hildy Brooks	February 24, 2010	3T7968	1.52
100	19	"Hiro Yoshimura"	John Stuart Scott	Ryan Murphy	Koji Kataoka	March 3, 2010	3T7969	1.88

== Ratings ==
Nip/Tuck : U.S. viewers per episode (millions)

Season	Episode number																		
Season	1	2	3	4	5	6	7	8	9	10	11	12	13	14	15	16	17	18	19
1	3.70	3.34	3.55	3.35	2.96	3.28	3.32	3.52	3.67	3.03	2.50	2.92	2.99	–					
2	3.81	3.17	3.49	3.04	3.09	3.74	3.80	3.88	3.45	3.73	4.30	4.15	3.75	3.67	3.85	5.22	–		
3	5.29	3.91	3.89	3.42	3.84	3.54	3.33	3.42	2.83	2.93	3.48	3.00	3.30	5.68	5.68	–			
4	4.86	3.86	3.45	3.92	3.34	3.55	3.98	3.26	3.27	3.91	3.47	3.30	3.02	2.84	3.38	–			
5A	4.34	3.33	3.56	3.21	3.40	2.49	2.52	1.94	2.19	2.84	2.89	3.34	2.71	2.98	–				
5B	3.12	2.53	2.68	2.70	2.33	2.40	2.10	2.39	–										
6	2.92	2.23	2.20	2.17	1.75	1.89	1.41	2.41	1.75	2.09	1.71	1.96	1.89	1.81	1.54	1.73	1.49	1.52	1.88

Audience measurement performed by Nielsen Media Research
