= Nip/Tuck season 6 =

2009–2010 season of American tv series

Nip/Tuck
- Season 6
- DVD cover
- No. of episodes: 19

Release
- Original network: FX
- Original release: October 14, 2009 – March 3, 2010

Season chronology
- ← Previous; Season 5

The sixth and final season of Nip/Tuck premiered on October 14, 2009 and concluded on March 3, 2010. Though a seventh season was originally set to air in 2011, the remaining nine episodes were merged into the sixth season.

== Cast and characters ==
=== Main cast ===
- Dylan Walsh as Dr. Sean McNamara
- Julian McMahon as Dr. Christian Troy
- John Hensley as Matt McNamara
- Roma Maffia as Liz Cruz
- Kelly Carlson as Kimber Henry
- Joely Richardson as Julia McNamara

=== Special guest stars ===
- Rose McGowan as Dr. Theodora Rowe
- Linda Hunt as The Voice of Authority
- Vanessa Redgrave as Dr. Erica Noughton
- Melanie Griffith as Brandie Henry
- Frances Conroy as Jane Fields
- Joan Rivers as herself
- Joan Van Ark as Annette Wainwright
- Donna Mills as Lulu Grandiron
- Famke Janssen as Ava Moore

=== Recurring cast ===
- Mario Lopez as Dr. Mike Hamoui
- Kelsey Lynn Batelaan as Annie McNamara
- Matthew Glave as Jerry
- Candis Cayne as Alexis Stone
- Gilles Marini as Renaldo Panettiere
- Tina Lifford as Warden DeMarco
- George Newbern as Dr. Curtis Ryerson
- Tony Tambi as Nsolo
- Robert LaSardo as Escobar Gallardo
- Ivar Brogger as Agent Reynolds
- Melonie Diaz as Ramona Perez

== Episodes ==
No. overall	No. in season	Title	Directed by	Written by	Patient portrayer	Original release date	Prod. code	Viewers (millions)
82	1	"Don Hoberman"	Brad Falchuk	Ryan Murphy	Mark Atteberry	October 14, 2009	3T7901	2.92
In the sixth season premiere, Sean and Christian struggle to keep McNamara/Troy thriving in a failing economy, and enlist another surgeon to attain additional income. Liz receives life-altering news, and Matt and Kimber seek new, separate career paths with mixed results. Meanwhile, Sean remains distant from Teddy despite their seemingly flourishing relationship.
83	2	"Enigma"	John Stuart Scott	Lyn Greene & Richard Levine	Parker Croft	October 21, 2009	3T7902	2.23
Sean makes unusual attempts to battle his insomnia. Christian and Kimber begin a joint business venture to alleviate financial strains. A furious Liz confronts Christian and offers Kimber unsolicited advice about him.
84	3	"Briggitte Reinholt"	Dirk Craft	Sean Jablonski	Lee Garlington	October 28, 2009	3T7903	2.20
Sean and Teddy make a surprising announcement. Sean discovers some troubling news about his daughter, Annie, who is in town visiting. And when a patient, Briggitte Reinholt, dies, it seems to be her own fault... but is it?
85	4	"Jenny Juggs"	Jesse Bochco	Jennifer Salt	Kiersten Warren	November 4, 2009	3T7904	2.17
Christian struggles to understand a patient with anger-management issues. Sean and Christian learn how Matt is earning an income, despite Matt's attempts to keep it hidden. Meanwhile, Teddy convinces Annie to go on a camping trip with Sean and the rest of the family.
86	5	"Abigail Sullivan"	John Stuart Scott	Brad Falchuk	Amy Farrington	November 11, 2009	3T7905	1.75
Matt's crime spree catches up with him, and Julia returns from New York to help in his recovery. Sean learns the frightening truth about Teddy. Plus, a new patient suffers from extreme separation anxiety.
87	6	"Alexis Stone"	Tim Hunter	Hank Chilton	Candis Cayne	November 18, 2009	3T7906	1.89
Julia's mother, Erica, returns newly married to a much younger man, Renaldo Panettiere, and threatens to take custody of Annie and her brother. To thwart Erica's efforts, Sean and Julia present a happy and united front. Meanwhile, Christian takes to a new patient, Alexis Stone, and Dr. Mike Hamoui reveals his future plans with Kimber.
88	7	"Alexis Stone II"	John Stuart Scott	Ryan Murphy	Candis Cayne	November 25, 2009	3T7907	1.41
Both Matt and Alexis Stone request unusual surgical procedures from Christian. Erica discovers the horrible truth about her new husband, Renaldo, and drops the custody case. And, after a lifetime of torment from her mother, Julia seeks revenge.
89	8	"Lola Wlodkowski"	Eric Stoltz	Lyn Greene & Richard Levine	Danica Sheridan	December 2, 2009	3T7908	2.41
Christian's views on beauty are questioned after witnessing Kimber's self-loathing and later having a sexual encounter with one of Liz's friends, an overweight and confident nudist. Sean, in the middle of an emotional crisis, encourages a patient, Tracy, (guest star Jessica Collins) to discover her own sexuality after she and her husband Skip (guest star Mark Deklin) request surgery to remove Tracy's nipples, in their continuing pursuit of becoming exact Barbie and Ken replicas.
90	9	"Benny Nilsson"	John Stuart Scott	Sean Jablonski	Luke McClure	December 9, 2009	3T7909	1.75
Sean is surprised by the sudden re-appearance of his long-lost brother Brendan (guest star Neil Hopkins), a drug addict and con artist who was believed to be dead. Brendan asks for surgery to repair his meth-ravaged face in order to start up his own business, but Christian doesn't trust his proclamations to be clean. A Swedish banker (guest star Hans Tester) requests surgery on his adopted son's face to make him look more like him. Christian forms an immediate friendship with the boy, but quickly discovers a shocking truth about the boy's relationship with his father. Christian faces financial ruin after he is left hundreds of thousands of dollars in debt.
91	10	"Wesley Clovis"	Tate Donovan	Jennifer Salt	Eric Stonestreet	December 16, 2009	3T7960	2.09
Sean suffers an ethical and moral dilemma when he is offered a deal which, in return for performing liposuction on an obese prisoner about to be executed, would result in Matt being released from prison. Christian, after discovering that Kimber is pregnant, orders her to have an abortion or lose him in the process. His ultimatum grows when he promises to marry her if she goes through with what he wants. A desperate Kimber turns to both Liz and Mike (Mario Lopez) when deciding how far she is prepared to go for the man she loves. Matt discovers information that could jeopardize his possible release. Note: This episode aired on FX as the sixth season finale.
92	11	"Dan Daly"	Elodie Keene	Ryan Murphy	Wayne Pére	January 6, 2010	3T7961	1.71
As they prepare to accept a prestigious award from their alma mater, Sean grows increasingly tired of covering up Christian's numerous indiscretions, a pattern going back to their first initial meeting in college. Kimber, now married to Christian and working as an interior decorator, heads up the remodeling of the McNamara/Troy practice, but continues to worry about Christian's fidelity. A new patient, suffering from the self-mutilating disorder Lesch–Nyhan syndrome, comes to McNamara/Troy for reconstructive surgery. Guest starring George Newbern. Note: This episode also aired on FX, as the seventh season premiere.
93	12	"Willow Banks"	Tim Hunter	Brad Falchuk	Mini Andén	January 13, 2010	3T7962	1.96
Kimber grows frustrated by changes in Christian's physical appearance and his lack of respect for her new career, pushing her into the arms of her newest interior design client: Sean. Christian refuses to operate on a former supermodel who wants to surgically alter her face in an effort to look ordinary. Sean operates on Rupert Kenney (guest star Andy Comeau), a survivor of an eighteen-year coma who wants to both look and feel like his younger self.
94	13	"Joel Seabrook"	Tate Donovan	Hank Chilton	Tim Guinee	January 20, 2010	3T7963	1.89
Kimber reaches an emotional crossroads in regards to both her crumbling marriage to Christian and her affair with Sean. Meanwhile, Christian comes to a point of clarity over his marriage while experimenting with the dangerous sex act of erotic asphyxiation. Sean reunites with his humanitarian college friend, Dr Curtis Ryerson (guest star George Newbern), and becomes interested in performing more pro-bono surgery. McNamara/Troy fix the face of a man who survived a suicide attempt jumping from the Golden Gate Bridge. Guest starring Mario Lopez.
95	14	"Sheila Carlton"	Craig Zisk	Lyn Greene & Richard Levine	Christine Estabrook	January 27, 2010	3T7964	1.81
Christian, devastated by a death in the family, seeks emotional comfort with Kimber's estranged mother Brandy (guest star Melanie Griffith). Sean postpones his trip to Africa out of respect for Christian's pain. While Curtis (guest star George Newbern) is out of the country, Sean has an intimate encounter with his doctor wife (guest star Christine Adams). McNamara/Troy operate on a woman whose faced was horrifically scarred by the pet chimpanzee owned by her best friend Jane (guest star Frances Conroy), who herself is crippled with guilt over killing the animal to save her friend's life.
96	15	"Virginia Hayes"	Hank Chilton	Hank Chilton	Kate Norby	February 3, 2010	3T7965	1.54
Sean and Christian are forced to re-visit past actions when Aurelia Gallardo (guest star Sandra Vergara), daughter of the deceased crime lord Escobar Gallardo (guest star Robert LaSardo), shows up at McNamara/Troy seeking answers about her father, stirring tremendous guilt within Sean. Christian's decision to operate on a small-town girl seeking surgery to make her a Hollywood "10" backfires, exposing an elaborate con in the process.
97	16	"Dr. Griffin"	Tim Hunter	Jennifer Salt	Daniel Benzali	February 10, 2010	3T7967	1.73
Sean and Christian begin psychotherapy in an attempt to resolve their escalating problems, with both revealing long-held secrets and their true perspectives on one another. Liz joins in with therapy too, revealing her own opinions on the Sean/Christian relationship, as well as a secret she has been keeping from Christian. Matt announces plans for the rest of his life, and introduces Sean and Christian to his fiancee Ramona (guest star Melonie Diaz).
98	17	"Christian Troy II"	Diana Valentine	Sean Jablonski	Julian McMahon	February 17, 2010	3T7966	1.49
McNamara/Troy face a troubling future when they discover a growing market in "injectable" procedures, which many believe will signal the death of plastic surgery. While under anesthetic during face lift surgery, Christian enters a dream world where he encounters past patients (guest stars Joan Rivers, Joan Van Ark and Donna Mills), experiences Sean's disappointments, comes to terms with Kimber's death, and meets his biological father (guest star Robert Davi). Liz dates a pharmaceutical rep (guest star Lesley Fera) separated from her husband. Guest starring George Newbern.
99	18	"Walter & Edith Krieger"	Dirk Craft	Brad Falchuk	Harold Gould & Hildy Brooks	February 24, 2010	3T7968	1.52
Ava Moore (guest star Famke Janssen) returns, requesting surgery to fix the face of her adopted son, who is suffering from Post kala-azar dermal leishmaniasis. Meanwhile, she discovers Matt's approaching nuptials, and once again manipulates her way into his life. At the same time, Julia arrives in Los Angeles with surprising news about her personal life, a revelation which provokes both Sean and Christian to make separate advances on her. Liz is told of the health of her unborn child. A married pair of elderly Holocaust survivors come to McNamara/Troy for surgical removal of their individual numbered tattoos, inflicted on them by the Nazis. But the removal provokes deep guilt in one of the pair. Guest starring Melonie Diaz.
100	19	"Hiro Yoshimura"	John Stuart Scott	Ryan Murphy	Koji Kataoka	March 3, 2010	3T7969	1.88
In the series finale, Christian strikes a deal with Ava (Famke Janssen) in which he'd operate on baby Raphael as long as she stays away from Matt. While preparing to leave for London, Julia worries about Sean's state of mind. Liz is overwhelmed by Sean's excitement over her pregnancy. Both Julia's worries and a vision of Kimber force Christian to reconsider his long-standing relationship with Sean. An elderly Japanese porn star comes to McNamara/Troy requesting surgery to remove surgical scars before his big debut in an American porn movie. Guest starring Melonie Diaz.

== U.S television ratings ==
Season premiere			Season finale	
Date	Viewers total (in millions)	Viewers 18–49 (in millions)	Date	Viewers total (in millions)
October 14, 2009	2.92	1.88	March 3, 2010	1.8

== Reception ==
The sixth season received generally positive reviews from critics, holding a 63% fresh rating on Rotten Tomatoes, the show's lowest-rated season on the site. The site's critic consensus read "Nip/Tuck wisely trains its focus on the relationship between the central duo of Christian and Sean during its final season, but this last hurrah often feels like an afterthought for a series that was left too long on the operating room table." Critic Kevin Carr wrote "Manages to keep things fresh and out-of-the-box ... Just when you think the ideas get old, a new, bizarre cosmetic surgery element is thrown at you." Michael Haigis of Screen Rant wrote, "Even though it may not have the lasting impact of its contemporaries, Nip/Tuck was a bell weather [sic], revealing the true potential of FX." Joe Reid of The Atlantic gave a mixed review, writing "It was pretty much a guarantee that the final season of Nip/Tuck would be an ungainly mess, since that was the trajectory the show had been on since pretty much the beginning. But my oh my did it not disappoint in that respect."

Many critics, however, argued that by the sixth series the show had run its course and criticized the show's repetitive use of imbued scenes, with People writing "The show was cutting-edge in many ways: the operating-room gore, the tone (cool, chic nastiness) and a willingness – often exasperating, often perversely impressive – to go waaaay over the top. Nip didn't just jump the shark, it pole-vaulted it", whilst Margaret Lyons wrote for Vulture that "Nip/Tuck did not end when it ought to have and instead dragged its sorry bones to L.A., where it crapped away all its story integrity and became both boring and redundant." Cindy White at IGN wrote "It's clear from watching these episodes that the show's better days are behind it. It's actually appropriate that Nip/Tuck should go out this way, considering it frequently explores the uphill struggle to maintain youth and vitality as time marches on."
