= Nip/Tuck season 2 =

2004 season of American tv series

Nip/Tuck
- Season 2
- DVD cover
- No. of episodes: 16

Release
- Original network: FX
- Original release: June 22 – October 5, 2004

Season chronology
- ← Previous; Season 1 Next → Season 3

The second season of Nip/Tuck premiered on June 22, 2004, and concluded on October 5, 2004. It consisted of 16 episodes.

== Cast and characters ==
=== Main cast ===
- Dylan Walsh as Dr. Sean McNamara
- Julian McMahon as Dr. Christian Troy
- John Hensley as Matt McNamara
- Roma Maffia as Liz Cruz
- Joely Richardson as Julia McNamara

=== Special guest stars ===
- Vanessa Redgrave as Erica Noughton
- Famke Janssen as Ava Moore
- Alec Baldwin as Dr. Barrett Moore
- Joan Rivers as herself (uncredited)

=== Recurring cast ===
- Kelsey Lynn Batelaan as Annie McNamara
- Jessalyn Gilsig as Gina Russo
- Andrew Leeds as Henry Shapiro
- Georg Stanford Brown as James Sutherland
- Kelly Carlson as Kimber Henry
- Nancy Cassaro as Suzanne Epstein
- Ruth Williamson as Hedda Grubman
- Seth Gabel as Adrian Moore
- Jill Clayburgh as Bobbi Broderick
- Mary Page Keller as Andrea Hall
- Rebecca Gayheart as Natasha Charles
- Phillip Rhys as Jude Sawyer
- Julie Warner as Megan O'Hara
- Joey Slotnick as Dr. Merril Bobolit
- D. W. Moffett as Kevin Hotchkiss
- Bruno Campos as Dr. Quentin Costa
- Conor O'Farrell as Det. Fischman
- Robert LaSardo as Escobar Gallardo

== Episodes ==
No. overall	No. in season	Title	Directed by	Written by	Patient portrayer	Original release date	Prod. code	Viewers (millions)
14	1	"Erica Noughton"	Ryan Murphy	Ryan Murphy	Vanessa Redgrave	June 22, 2004	177601	3.81
Sean turns 40, and has begun to experience spasms in his hand which affect his surgical skills. Gina (guest star Jessalyn Gilsig) tries to keep baby Wilber away from Christian, who later discovers that Wilber's nanny (guest star Portia Dawson) has been drugging him to keep him asleep. Julia's mother, Erica, comes to Miami wanting a face lift just before she starts promoting her new book. Erica and Christian have a history: they slept together at Sean and Julia's wedding. A middle-aged woman (guest star Romy Rosemont) and her gay best friend (guest star Chris Diamantopoulos) come to McNamara/Troy, the woman seeking corrective surgery after being shot in the face nine months ago. But their friendship harbors a dark secret...
15	2	"Christian Troy"	Jamie Babbit	Sean Jablonski	Julian McMahon	June 29, 2004	177602	3.17
Christian breaks his nose on a woman's vagina after she sneezes during oral sex, but is worried about Sean correcting it due to his hand spasms. Matt discovers that Henry (guest star Andrew Leeds) has been arrested for raping Cara Fitzgerald, and has informed the authorities about the hit-and-run Matt was involved in. Guest starring Vanessa Redgrave, Orla Brady and Jessalyn Gilsig.
16	3	"Manya Mabika"	Elodie Keene	Lyn Greene & Richard Levine	Aisha Tyler	July 6, 2004	177603	3.49
Sean discovers that Julia has been faking her orgasms, and asks Christian for sex advice. He also encounters Ava Moore (guest star Famke Janssen), a life coach, and recommends she talk to Julia about her recent stress. Ava suggests that Erica (Vanessa Redgrave) is at the root of Julia's problems and should be cut out of her life. Gina (Jessalyn Gilsig) tells Christian she wants another baby, and wants him to be the birth father. A Somali woman wants a clitoral reconstruction after undergoing genital mutilation. The operation is a success, and Christian decides he's the best person to give her an orgasm. A young man, Elias (guest star Michael Robert Brandon), who cannot produce hair follicles on his body, requests hair implants. Guest starring Georg Stanford Brown.
17	4	"Mrs. Grubman"	Jamie Babbit	Jennifer Salt	Ruth Williamson	July 13, 2004	177604	3.04
Sean and Julia are shocked when Annie (guest star Kelsey Batelaan) enters early puberty. Christian discovers that Gina (Jessalyn Gilsig) is recruiting character witnesses for the custody trial, including Kimber (guest star Kelly Carlson). Christian takes her out to dinner to try and stop her from testifying against him and discovers she has become addicted to cocaine. Mrs Grubman returns, requesting a knee lift. Guest starring Georg Stanford Brown.
18	5	"Joel Gideon"	Nelson McCormick	Brad Falchuk	Doug Savant	July 20, 2004	177605	3.09
A car accident provokes Sean into risking his life in dangerous activities. The custody trial begins, with James Sutherland (guest star Georg Stanford Brown) wanting full custody of Wilber. Julia reveals the identity of Matt's real father. A mountain climber requests surgery to fix his face, after his latest expedition caused him to lose skin from his nose. Guest starring Jessalyn Gilsig.
19	6	"Bobbi Broderick"	Michael M. Robin	Lyn Greene & Richard Levine	Jill Clayburgh	July 27, 2004	177606	3.74
Ava (Famke Janssen) is hired to treat Matt, and offers him sex in return for good grades. Matt becomes obsessed with Ava, and is arrested for masturbating outside her window. Christian discovers Ava's games and threatens her, until she blackmails him with the truth about Matt's paternity. Liz reveals that she wants to have a baby, and Christian offers her his sperm. A middle-aged woman requests liposuction in order to get a job as a saleswoman at Saks Fifth Avenue but is unhappy with the results, stalking Sean in frustration. A woman, Allegra Calderello (guest star Elaine Hausman), needs surgery to fix her lips, which were burnt off in a kitchen accident. Sean and Christian suggest replacing her lips with skin from her labia. Guest starring Seth Gabel and Richard Portnow.
20	7	"Naomi Gaines"	Craig Zisk	Sean Jablonski	Leslie Bibb	August 3, 2004	177607	3.80
Sean is provoked into performing pro-bono surgery on a beautiful model who was raped and horrifically scarred across her face by a serial attacker dubbed The Carver. Julia invites Ava (Famke Janssen) and her son Adrian (Seth Gabel) over for dinner, where Ava's relationship with Matt is revealed, creating conflict between the two women. Bobbi Broderick (guest star Jill Clayburgh) continues to try and destroy Sean's reputation.
21	8	"Agatha Ripp"	Michael M. Robin	Ryan Murphy	Sarah Paulson	August 10, 2004	177608	3.88
Julia experiences panic attacks and shingles, a sign of stress or guilt. She eventually confesses to Sean that he isn't Matt's father. Liz reveals that she is pregnant, but is concerned about the health of the baby. Sean and Christian treat a woman who claims to be a victim of stigmata. Guest starring Fionnula Flanagan.
22	9	"Rose and Raven Rosenberg"	Elodie Keene	Ryan Murphy & Brad Falchuk	Lori and Reba Schappell	August 17, 2004	177609	3.45
Sean and Christian prepare to separate as partners following the revelations about Matt's paternity. They are temporarily forced to work together on a special surgery involving the separation of two adult conjoined twins (guest stars Lori and George Schappell, credited as Lori and Reba Schappell). In their dorm room, Sean and Christian have a threesome with a hooker (guest star Jennifer O'Dell) who bears an uncanny resemblance to Julia. Guest starring Jack Coleman.
23	10	"Kimber Henry"	Nelson McCormick	Jennifer Salt	Kelly Carlson	August 24, 2004	177610	3.73
Kimber returns, revealing she is now a successful porn star. So popular that a sex doll is being produced in her image, but Kimber is unhappy with the doll's vagina and wants McNamara/Troy to surgically alter it before the doll starts production. Living at home alone, Sean has sex with the doll. Julia meets a handsome man (guest star Jeffrey Nordling) at a singles bar, but is disturbed by his unusual fetish. A male writer (guest star J.K. Simmons) requests breast implants to understand his wife's (guest star Jessica Steen) pain following her battle with breast cancer.
24	11	"Natasha Charles"	Greer Shephard	Lyn Greene & Richard Levine	Rebecca Gayheart	August 31, 2004	177611	4.30
Christian finds himself attracted to an alluring blind woman who requests new eyes. After seeing Sean with his new lover Kimber (Kelly Carlson), Julia gets breast implants. Erica (Vanessa Redgrave) learns that Julia is living in a small apartment since the separation, and tries to get Sean to understand her daughter's pain.
25	12	"Julia McNamara"	Michael M. Robin	Ryan Murphy & Hank Chilton	Joely Richardson	September 7, 2004	177612	4.15
After falling through a glass door, Julia undergoes surgery to fix her scarred face and asks for her breast implants to be removed at the same time. While under anesthesia, Julia is guided through an alternate universe by Ava (Famke Janssen) and is shown how her life would be if she married Christian after college instead of Sean. Finding herself attracted to the alternate Sean just like she is to Christian in the real world, Julia finally comes to terms with what she really wants from life. Guest starring Vanessa Redgrave, Kelly Carlson, Phillip Rhys, Julie Warner and Ruth Williamson.
26	13	"Oona Wentworth"	Scott Brazil	Sean Jablonski & Jennifer Salt	Brooks Almy	September 14, 2004	177613	3.75
Christian discovers that his former rival, Dr Merrill Bobolit (guest star Joey Slotnick), has been working as a cheap plastic surgeon and performing dangerous operations on desperate clients with few safety precautions, with the backroom of a nail salon as his base of operations. Matt and Adrian (Seth Gabel) clash at school, and both face punishment after Adrian's stash of drugs are found on school premises. Ava (Famke Janssen) suggests that Christian bribe the school principal with free plastic surgery.
27	14	"Trudy Nye"	Elodie Keene	Hank Chilton	Lisa Waltz	September 21, 2004	177614	3.67
Christian decides to end his relationship with Natasha (guest star Rebecca Gayheart). Similarly, the relationship between Sean and Kimber (Kelly Carlson) crumbles after she requests surgery to change the "love lines" on her hand. Julia and Sean put their differences aside to separate Matt and Ava (Famke Janssen). Adrian (Seth Gabel) begins to unravel as his jealousy of Matt and Ava's relationship reaches breaking point. Sean and Christian fix the nose of an abused housewife, whose husband (guest star Andrew Borba) is in prison for killing their child. Guest starring D.W. Moffett.
28	15	"Sean McNamara"	Michael M. Robin	Brad Falchuk	Dylan Walsh	September 28, 2004	177615	3.85
Sean continues operating on victims of The Carver, and is attacked by the masked rapist himself. Gina (Jessalyn Gilsig) reveals that she is HIV+, forcing Christian to track down Wilber and his father (guest star Georg Stanford Brown) and his own ex-lovers. Kimber (Kelly Carlson) starts directing porn movies, and tells Christian that she'll always be there for him. Guest starring Bruno Campos, D.W. Moffett and Conor O'Farrell.
29	16	"Joan Rivers"	Ryan Murphy	Ryan Murphy	Joan Rivers	October 5, 2004	177616	5.22
Ava (Famke Janssen) and Matt plot to run away to Paris together, but not before Matt gets hold of pills for her from his father's office. Christian discovers the couple's plans, and then an altogether more shocking secret about Ava. Investigating her past, Sean, Christian and Julia team up to push Ava out of Matt's life once and for all. A vision of Escobar Gallardo (guest star Robert LaSardo) provokes Sean into taking down The Carver himself. Comedian Joan Rivers (as herself) comes to McNamara/Troy requesting all her previous surgeries undone. Guest starring Alec Baldwin, Seth Gabel and Conor O'Farrell.

== U.S television ratings ==
Season premiere			Season finale			Viewers total (in millions)	Viewers age 18–49 (in millions)
Date	Viewers total (in millions)	Viewers 18–49 (in millions)	Date	Viewers total (in millions)	Viewers 18–49 (in millions)	Viewers total (in millions)	Viewers age 18–49 (in millions)
June 22, 2004	3.8	2.7	October 5, 2004	5.2	3.6	3.8	2.6

== Reception ==
The second season received positive reviews from critics, holding an 86% fresh rating on Rotten Tomatoes, an increase from the first season. People wrote "The second season of Nip/Tuck seems giddily determined to top the first", whilst David Bianculli of the New York Daily News wrote "The FX series begins its second year with assurance, inventiveness and more than a little boldness. If you're missing the sassy frankness and playfulness of Sex and the City, look no further: The torch has been passed." Brian Lowry of Variety wrote "Program creator Ryan Murphy has consistently made like Fred Astaire, dancing up to the edge of 'too far' without toppling over." Steve Johnson of the Chicago Tribune gave a less favorable review, saying "Amid this determined luridness, the show tries to stick in some 'real' drama, and the effect is knock-you-off-your-seat disconcerting."
