= Nip/Tuck season 1 =

2003 season of American tv series

Nip/Tuck
- Season 1
- DVD cover
- No. of episodes: 13

Release
- Original network: FX
- Original release: July 22 – October 21, 2003

Season chronology
- Next → Season 2

The first season of Nip/Tuck premiered on July 23, 2003, and concluded on October 21, 2003. It consisted of 13 episodes.

== Cast and characters ==
=== Main cast ===
- Dylan Walsh as Dr. Sean McNamara
- Julian McMahon as Dr. Christian Troy
- John Hensley as Matt McNamara
- Valerie Cruz as Dr. Grace Santiago
- Joely Richardson as Julia McNamara

=== Recurring cast ===
- Robert LaSardo as Escobar Gallardo
- Kelsey Lynn Batelaan as Annie McNamara
- Kelly Carlson as Kimber Henry
- Roma Maffia as Liz Winters
- Nancy Cassaro as Suzanne Epstein
- Kate Mara as Vanessa Bartholomew
- Sophia Bush as Ridley Lange
- Ruth Williamson as Hedda Grubman
- Jonathan Del Arco as Sofia Lopez
- Phillip Rhys as Jude Sawyer
- Joey Slotnick as Dr. Merril Bobolit
- Brenda Strong as Iris
- Jessalyn Gilsig as Gina Russo
- Julie Warner as Megan O'Hara
- Rick Kelly as Jim O'Hara
- Andrew Leeds as Henry Shapiro
- Daniel Zacapa as Pepe

== Episodes ==
No. overall	No. in season	Title	Directed by	Written by	Patient portrayer	Original release date	Prod. code	Viewers (millions)
1	1	"Pilot"	Ryan Murphy	Ryan Murphy	Geoffrey Rivas	July 22, 2003	475194	3.70
Best friends since college, Sean McNamara and Christian Troy run a plastic surgery practice in Miami, but Christian's unethical acceptance of $300,000 from a mobster desperate for a new face threatens their friendship and their business. Sean's wife Julia struggles at home with her lingering feelings for Christian, stemming from a one-night stand they had together while in college. Sean's son Matt goes to Christian when requesting a circumcision. Aspiring model Kimber (guest star Kelly Carlson), the latest in a long line of Christian's conquests, discovers the ugly truth about his womanizing. Guest starring Ruth Williamson, Ara Celi and Roma Maffia.
2	2	"Mandi/Randi"	Ryan Murphy	Ryan Murphy	Caitlin & Melinda Dahl	July 29, 2003	176451	3.34
McNamara/Troy's new psychologist (guest star Kevin Chamberlin) creates conflict between Sean and Christian, while Sean grows interested in an independent shrink, Dr. Grace Santiago, professionally and personally. Christian's feelings for Julia begin to affect his sex life. Julia attempts to create direction in her life and comes to terms with her recent actions. Matt worries about sex with his girlfriend Vanessa (guest star Kate Mara) and her possible reaction to his foreskin, leading him to mutilate himself. Sean tries to encourage Liz (Roma Maffia) to return to work. Sean and Christian operate on identical twin sisters, who request surgery to look different from one another.
3	3	"Nanette Babcock"	Lawrence Trilling	Ryan Murphy	Lindsay Hollister	August 5, 2003	176452	3.55
Sean operates on Matt's botched attempt at circumcision, while Matt discovers the truth about Vanessa (Kate Mara). Christian is forced to play hardball with ageing, widowed socialite Mrs. Grubman (guest star Ruth Williamson), who threatens McNamara/Troy with a malpractice suit after an accident during surgery. Julia comes to terms with her parenting after facing criminal charges for flushing Frisky the gerbil down the toilet. An obese woman requests drastic surgery in time for her upcoming high school reunion, leading Christian and Grace to butt heads over her mental state. Guest starring Sophia Bush, Ara Celi and Roma Maffia.
4	4	"Sofia Lopez"	Michael M. Robin	Sean Jablonski	Jonathan Del Arco	August 12, 2003	176453	3.35
Sean fixes botched surgery on a transgender woman and discovers he has a personal link to the hack surgeon responsible. Christian's plan to seek porn stars as clients backfires. Julia returns to undergraduate school and strikes up a friendship with one of her fellow students (guest star Phillip Rhys). Matt's one night stand with a pornographic "fluffer" (guest star Marnette Patterson) results in a possible STD. Sean and Christian's plastic surgeon rival Dr. Merrill Bobolit (guest star Joey Slotnick) offers Christian a job in his practice. Guest starring Patti D'Arbanville and Brenda Strong.
5	5	"Kurt Dempsey"	Elodie Keene	Lyn Greene & Richard Levine	Vincent Angell	August 19, 2003	176454	2.96
Sean and Julia's marriage is tested when Julia discovers she is pregnant, a surprise that could derail her plans to become a doctor. After discovering him having sex with a patient in his office, Grace suggests Christian attend a Sexaholics Anonymous session. At the group, Christian encounters sex addict Gina Russo (guest star Jessalyn Gilsig), whom he seduces into bed. A white man requests plastic surgery on his eyes in order to please the conservative parents of his Japanese fiancée. A middle-aged woman (guest star Gabrielle Carteris) requests a nose job following a bad car accident but Christian and Grace have suspicions over her story. Guest starring Don McManus, Phillip Rhys, Brenda Strong and Roma Maffia.
6	6	"Megan O'Hara"	Craig Zisk	Jennifer Salt	Julie Warner	September 2, 2003	176455	3.28
Sean, saddened over Julia's miscarriage, connects with a breast cancer sufferer who requests a boob job. Christian's car and boat are wrecked by a mysterious stalker, leading him to confront many of his exes, including Kimber (Kelly Carlson). Vanessa (Kate Mara) worries about girlfriend Ridley's (Sophia Bush) sudden lack of interest in her. She asks Matt to participate in a threesome with the two of them to spice up their relationship. Bliss Berger (guest star Leslie Grossman), having lost a significant amount of weight through exercise, requests surgery to remove excess fat from her arms before she goes on a blind date with a physically perfect doctor. Guest starring Jessalyn Gilsig.
7	7	"Cliff Mantegna"	Scott Brazil	Brad Falchuk	Alex Carter	September 9, 2003	176456	3.32
Christian discovers, through a male patient who requests liposuction on his chest, a secret upscale swingers club. Managing to get an invite, he brings girlfriend Kimber (Kelly Carlson) to the gathering. Julia's friend Jude (Phillip Rhys) starts working as an intern for McNamara/Troy, while Sean worries about their blossoming friendship. Matt's three-way relationship with Vanessa (Kate Mara) and Ridley (Sophia Bush) is exposed, leading to a three-family intervention. Sean's neck problems lead him to a reunion with Megan O'Hara (guest star Julie Warner), who works as a chiropractor.
8	8	"Cara Fitzgerald"	Jamie Babbit	Ryan Murphy	Keri Lynn Pratt	September 16, 2003	176457	3.52
Matt and his friend Henry (guest star Andrew Leeds) critically injure one of their fellow high schoolers in a hit-and-run car accident while under the influence of marijuana. Matt later discovers that the girl's strict Christian Scientist mother (guest star Alyson Reed) refuses to allow surgery to be performed on her disfigured daughter. Christian connects with a fellow victim of childhood sexual abuse (guest star Katy Selverstone). Grace discovers Sean's affair with Megan (Julie Warner). A priest (guest star Jamie McShane) conceals his identity by having Christian remove an incriminating birthmark.
9	9	"Sofia Lopez II"	Nelson McCormick	Sean Jablonski	Jonathan Del Arco	September 23, 2003	176458	3.67
Matt discovers Sean's affair with Megan (Julie Warner). Christian, tired of dating Kimber (Kelly Carlson), suggests a deal with Merrill Bobolit (Joey Slotnick) to trade her for his prized Lamborghini. Julia discovers Jude's (Phillip Rhys) secret double life. Sofia Lopez returns but questions her plans for transgender surgery when she falls in love with Liz (Roma Maffia).
10	10	"Adelle Coffin"	Michael M. Robin	Dell Chandler & Ryan Murphy	Nan Martin	September 30, 2003	176459	3.03
Sean and Christian prepare for their upcoming recertification test but Sean is distracted when Megan (Julie Warner) is told by doctors that her cancer is terminal. Mrs. Grubman (guest star Ruth Williamson) and her new husband Sumner (guest star Jerry Hardin) both request genital rejuvenation surgery. Guest starring Joey Slotnick and Roma Maffia.
11	11	"Montana/Sassy/Justice"	Michael M. Robin	Lyn Greene & Richard Levine	Cheryl White	October 7, 2003	176460	2.50
Christian's ex-lover Gina (Jessalyn Gilsig) reveals that she is pregnant and that he has a week to decide whether he wants to be a part of his unborn child's life. Julia questions Matt's paternity. Matt discovers that Henry (Andrew Leeds) is romantically interested in Cara (guest star Keri Lynn Pratt), the girl they ran over. Sean and Liz (Roma Maffia) discover that McNamara/Troy's latest patient suffers from split-personality disorder and that each personality is requesting different plastic surgeries.
12	12	"Antonia Ramos"	Elodie Keene	Jennifer Salt & Brad Falchuk	Marisol Nichols	October 14, 2003	176461	2.92
Drug lord Escobar Gallardo (guest star Robert LaSardo) blackmails Sean and Christian to remove liquid-heroin implants from one of his many drug couriers illegally entering the country. Christian attempts to be a family man in preparing for the birth of his child. Julia befriends Sofia Lopez (guest star Jonathan Del Arco) after she joins her gym but Julia's fellow gym buddies have a problem with a transgender person being in their Pilates class. Guest starring Jessalyn Gilsig and Roma Maffia.
13	13	"Escobar Gallardo"	Ryan Murphy	Ryan Murphy	Robert LaSardo	October 21, 2003	176462	2.99
Escobar Gallardo continues to blackmail Sean and Christian, leading Sean to potential murder to protect his family. Gina (Jessalyn Gilsig) goes into labor, revealing a secret truth that destroys Christian. Julia discovers the truth about Matt's paternity. Christian discovers that Bobolit (Joey Slotnick) and Kimber (Kelly Carlson) are engaged. A wealthy socialite (guest star Ian Abercrombie) offers McNamara/Troy $150,000 to perform surgery on his prize-winning show dog. Guest starring Roma Maffia.

== U.S. television ratings ==
Season premiere			Season finale			Viewers total (in millions)	Viewers age 18–49 (in millions)
Date	Viewers total (in millions)	Viewers 18–49 (in millions)	Date	Viewers total (in millions)	Viewers 18–49 (in millions)	Viewers total (in millions)	Viewers age 18–49 (in millions)
July 22, 2003	3.7	2.0	October 21, 2003	2.99	2.1	3.25	2.2

== Reception ==
The first season received generally positive reviews from critics, holding a 74% fresh rating on Rotten Tomatoes. Robert Bianco of USA Today wrote "Gross, engrossing and ultimately and utterly fearless, Nip/Tuck is a show about the price we pay to keep up appearances – and about the effort a show has to go to these days to break through TV's clutter." Brian Lowry of the Los Angeles Times said "Both troubling and welcome ... Nip/Tuck both wallows in these shallow and twisted lives, while portraying them with warts and then some." McMahon and Walsh received praise for their performances, with Terry Kelleher of People Magazine stating "McMahon is perfect as a satyr with a seductive smile ... Walsh fares well in the difficult role of a man who swings back and forth between self-righteousness and complete moral confusion." Some criticism was aimed at the shows use of GUI, with David Bianculli of the New York Daily News saying "It's more artifice than art, and in everything from the performances to the dramatic contrivances, you can see the strain. You watch, and sometimes you smile or squirm – but you don't believe." Linda Stasi of the New York Post said "What's good here is the acting, and some of the story lines. But they are overshadowed by over-the-top gory surgeries and preposterous situations."
