= Nip/Tuck season 3 =

2005 season of American tv series

Nip/Tuck
- Season 3
- DVD cover
- No. of episodes: 15

Release
- Original network: FX
- Original release: September 20 – December 20, 2005

Season chronology
- ← Previous; Season 2 Next → Season 4

The third season of Nip/Tuck premiered on September 20, 2005 and concluded on December 20, 2005. It consisted of 15 episodes.

== Cast and characters ==
=== Main cast ===
- Dylan Walsh as Dr. Sean McNamara
- Julian McMahon as Dr. Christian Troy
- John Hensley as Matt McNamara
- Roma Maffia as Liz Cruz
- Bruno Campos as Dr. Quentin Costa
- Kelly Carlson as Kimber Henry
- Jessalyn Gilsig as Gina Russo
- Joely Richardson as Julia McNamara

=== Special guest stars ===
- Vanessa Redgrave as Dr. Erica Noughton
- Famke Janssen as Ava Moore
- Joan Rivers as herself
- Anne Heche as Nicole Morretti
- Brittany Snow as Ariel Alderman
- Rhona Mitra as Kit McGraw

=== Recurring cast ===
- Conor O'Farrell as Det. Fischman
- Phillip Rhys as Jude Sawyer
- Kelsey Lynn Batelaan as Annie McNamara
- Willam Belli as Cherry Peck
- Kathy Baker as Gail Pollack
- Mary Page Keller as Andrea Hall
- Tanner Richie as Austin Morretti
- Bob Gunton as Agent Sagamore
- Brian Kerwin as Eugene Alderman
- Colleen Flynn as Dr. Allamby

== Episodes ==
No. overall	No. in season	Title	Directed by	Written by	Patient portrayer	Original release date	Prod. code	Viewers (millions)
30	1	"Momma Boone"	Elodie Keene	Ryan Murphy	Kathy Lamkin	September 20, 2005	2T5951	5.29
As Christian tries to recover from his attack by The Carver, Sean must forge a new partnership to keep the practice running; Sean helps the police remove an obese woman from her couch; Julia realizes she needs to make a decision on her marriage
31	2	"Kiki"	Elodie Keene	Lyn Greene & Richard Levine	Kiki (gorilla)	September 27, 2005	2T5952	3.91
Christian and Liz perform cosmetic surgery on an extraordinary ape to help her chances of reproducing. After learning that Ava is a transgender woman, Matt questions his own sexuality and heads down a dark path. Tensions escalate at McNamara/Troy as Sean and Quentin, against Christian's wishes, remove the tattoos of a gang member who wants to go straight.
32	3	"Derek, Alex, and Gary"	Craig Zisk	Brad Falchuk	Adam Henderson, Aaron Moody and Graham Miller	October 4, 2005	2T5953	3.89
Sean, Julia and Christian struggle to find a common solution as Matt spirals out of control. Christian performs surgery at his former fraternity house to help cover up a hazing ritual gone awry. When Christian's open relationship with Kit - the sexy detective investigating The Carver's activities - and Kimber loses its appeal, Christian asks Quentin to help ease Kit out of the threesome.
33	4	"Rhea Reynolds"	Greer Shephard	Jennifer Salt	Tara Buck	October 11, 2005	2T5954	3.42
Christian has doubts about the latest Carver victim's story. The wife of an Alzheimer's patient requests extensive cosmetic surgery in order to find a way back into her husband's memories. Sean finds himself under investigation by Child Protective Services after Matt files a restraining order against him.
34	5	"Granville Trapp"	Jeremy Podeswa	Sean Jablonski	Erik Passoja	October 18, 2005	2T5955	3.84
Christian becomes the prime suspect in The Carver case after police find a damning piece of evidence at the scene of the latest Carver attack. An HIV-positive man who suffers from facial wasting comes to McNamara/Troy to have his appearance restored to one of good health.
35	6	"Frankenlaura"	Michael M. Robin	Hank Chilton	Valentin Siroon	October 25, 2005	2T5956	3.54
McNamara/Troy is in dire financial straits after Christian's arrest. Gina returns and forms an unexpected business alliance with Julia. Sean and Christian reluctantly become involved in the gruesome case of a man who reassembled a female corpse from the appendages of other dead bodies.
36	7	"Ben White"	Jeremy Podeswa	Lyn Greene & Richard Levine	John Billingsley	November 1, 2005	2T5957	3.33
A patient's extreme surgical request leaves Christian struggling between what the medical establishment says is right and what the patient says will make him feel whole. After leaving McNamara/Troy, Sean takes his surgery skills to the Witness Protection Program, where he transforms the appearance of a woman, Nikki Morretti, and her son, Austin. After a De La Mer Spa client reveals her startling beauty secret to Julia, Gina and Liz, they manufacture a new signature product - and hope the main ingredient remains a secret.
37	8	"Tommy Bolton"	Guy Ferland	Brad Falchuk	Blair Williamson	November 8, 2005	2T5958	3.42
Sean questions his growing romantic feelings for Nikki when he learns the dark truth about her past. The request for plastic surgery from a patient with Down Syndrome moves Christian to make contact with his birth mother, Gail Pollack. Quentin woos Julia, who welcomes the attention.
38	9	"Hannah Tedesco"	Michael M. Robin	Sean Jablonski	Uncredited	November 15, 2005	2T5959	2.83
The working relationship between Christian and Quentin worsens when they have an ethical disagreement over a groundbreaking surgery that would advance their medical reputations. Sean doesn't want Nikki to disappear into the Witness Protection Program without him. Christian gives Kimber a prenuptial ultimatum: give up her career in adult films or end their engagement.
39	10	"Madison Berg"	Greg Yaitanes	Jennifer Salt	Hallee Hirsh	November 22, 2005	2T5960	2.93
Christian and Kimber put the final touches on their wedding plans, but an unsigned prenuptial agreement casts a shadow of doubt across the occasion. Christian and Sean are stunned when Matt's new girlfriend, Ariel Alderman, reveals her racist beliefs.
40	11	"Abby Mays"	Michael M. Robin	Hank Chilton	Rebecca Metz	November 29, 2005	2T5961	3.48
Furious that Quentin is dating Julia, Sean resolves to do whatever it takes to force Quentin out of the practice. Christian claims to be fine after Kimber's sudden exit, but his relationship with a patient indicates otherwise. Sean fears that Matt may be linked to a series of hate crimes against former plastic surgery patients.
41	12	"Sal Perri"	David Nutter	Lyn Greene & Richard Levine	Louis Mustillo	December 6, 2005	2T5962	3.00
A jet bound from Miami to New York crashes after takeoff - and Julia's mother, Erica, may be on board. Christian, Sean, Liz and Julia struggle to save the lives of surviving passengers, and Sean must amputate the arms of one of the crash victims.
42	13	"Joy Kringle"	Greer Shephard	Sean Jablonski & Jennifer Salt	Elizabeth Ruscio	December 13, 2005	2T5963	3.30
A shopping-mall Mrs. Santa Claus comes to McNamara/Troy for liposuction before the holidays, but a discovery during surgery jeopardizes her marriage to Mr. Claus. Julia must make a decision that could profoundly affect the rest of her family's lives. Ariel asks Matt to help her take drastic measures to alter her appearance.
43	14	"Cherry Peck"	Craig Zisk	Brad Falchuk & Hank Chilton	Willam Belli	December 20, 2005	2T5964	5.68
Christian learns the truth about Kimber's wedding-day disappearance when he receives a grisly clue from The Carver. Detective Kit McGraw brings Carver suspect Quentin in for questioning. Cherry, the transgender woman whom Matt brutally beat, threatens to tell the police about her attacker unless Sean performs pro-bono plastic surgery. Julia's worries about her unexpected pregnancy give her a nightmare.
44	15	"Quentin Costa"	Ryan Murphy	Ryan Murphy	Bruno Campos	December 20, 2005	2T5965	5.68
In the season finale written and directed by series creator Ryan Murphy, The Carver goes on a slashing binge and attacks a sorority house as Kit grows closer to catching her nemesis. Sean, Christian, Matt and Cherry Peck are involved in separate games of torture. Julia makes a discovery about her pregnancy. And the identity of The Carver is finally revealed.

== U.S television ratings ==
Season premiere			Season finale			Viewers total (in millions)	Viewers age 18–49 (in millions)
Date	Viewers total (in millions)	Viewers 18–49 (in millions)	Date	Viewers total (in millions)	Viewers 18–49 (in millions)	Viewers total (in millions)	Viewers age 18–49 (in millions)
September 20, 2005	5.3	3.7	December 20, 2005	5.7	3.9	3.9	2.7

The third season aired in the fall of 2005, as opposed to the summer, like the previous two seasons. John Landgraf, president of FX, stated that such a move was a "huge risk", since it stacked up "against the full barrage of fall network competition". The second season premiere rating was eclipsed on September 20, 2005, when the third-season premiere, entitled "Momma Boone", drew roughly 5.3 million viewers. Three months later on December 20, 2005, the third-season finale, entitled "Cherry Peck / Quentin Costa", drew 5.7 million viewers. According to Zap2It, of those 5.7 million viewers, 3.9 million were in the 18–49 age group demographic, "making the finale the number-one episode among the key advertising demographic of any cable series in 2005. It's also the largest demographic number for any single telecast in the network's history." Despite some criticism, the story arc involving The Carver attracted even more of an audience to the series than any of the seasons before, reaching its climax in a December 20, 2005, 2-hour season finale, entitled "Cherry Peck / Quentin Costa", which became the most-watched scripted episode in the history of the FX network.

== Reception ==
The third season received positive reviews from critics, holding a 71% fresh rating on Rotten Tomatoes. Brian Lowry wrote for Variety "The not-so-subtle genius of this show is its ability to have it both ways – to skewer our culture's obsession with youth and beauty while simultaneously reveling in it." Melanie McFarland wrote for the Seattle Post-Intelligencer that "Beneath this skin is one-of-a-kind daring television that explores the complexities of human relationships with an unparalleled intelligence, sensitivity, appropriate level of fun and, when it is warranted, menace." Some criticism was aimed at the casting, with Joe Reid of The Atlantic quoting "Some unfortunate casting decisions placed a good deal of the plot's weight on the shoulders of people like Rhona Mitra and Bruno Campos, which was ... a mistake", whilst Gillian Flynn, at Entertainment Weekly, was critical of the season's storylines and character development.
