= Liz Cruz =

Liz Cruz may refer to:

- "Liz Cruz" (Nip/Tuck episode), an episode of the American television series Nip/Tuck
- Liz Cruz (tennis) (born 1985), Salvadoran tennis player
