= Schappell =

Schappell is a surname. Notable people with the surname include:

- Elissa Schappell, American writer and publisher
- Lori and George Schappell (1961–2024), American conjoined twins
