= Australian Film Institute International Award for Best Actor =

Australian film award

The Australian Film Institute International Award for Best Actor was an award in the annual Australian Film Institute Awards (by AFI). It was awarded from 2005-2010. The award has been superseded by the AFI's AACTA International Award for Best Actor.

== Previous winners and nominees ==
- 2005: Russell Crowe — Cinderella Man
- 2006: Heath Ledger — Brokeback Mountain
  - Eric Bana — Munich
  - Hugo Weaving — V for Vendetta
  - Anthony LaPaglia — Winter Solstice
- 2007: Dominic Purcell — Prison Break
  - Julian McMahon — Nip/Tuck
  - Eric Bana — Lucky You
  - Hugh Jackman — The Prestige
- 2008: Heath Ledger — The Dark Knight
  - Eric Bana — The Other Boleyn Girl
  - Russell Crowe — American Gangster
  - Jack Thompson — Leatherheads
- 2009: Russell Crowe — State of Play
  - Martin Henderson — House
  - Anthony LaPaglia — Without a Trace
  - Guy Pearce — Bedtime Stories
- 2010: Sam Worthington — Avatar
  - Simon Baker — The Mentalist – Season 2
  - Ryan Kwanten — True Blood – Season 3
  - Kodi Smit-McPhee — The Road
