= Player 5150 =

- Directed by: David O'Neill
- Production company: Azurelite Pictures
- Release date: 2008
- Country: United States
- Language: English

Player 5150 is a 2008 American film directed by David O'Neill.

== Plot ==
Joey is a stock trader with a gambling addiction. He and his wife Ali get in trouble with a loan shark Tony. Kelly Carlson plays Lucy, the loan shark's blonde assistant.

== Cast ==
- Scott Eastwood as Brian Vicks
- Kelly Carlson as Lucy
- Kathleen Robertson as Ali
- Christopher McDonald as Tony
- Bob Gunton as Nick
- Angela Little as Jenny Starz
- Elaine Hendrix as Mrs. Lanzelin
- Ethan Embry as Joey
- Bob Sapp as Beno
- Sandra Taylor as Concierge Dianne
- Paul Ben-Victor as Jimmy
- Sean O'Bryan as Jerry

== Production ==
Filming took place in Los Angeles and Las Vegas, and began in December 2006.
