= Lori and George Schappell =

American conjoined twins (1961–2024)

Lori Schappell George Schappell
- Born: Lori L. Schappell; Dori A. Schappell; September 18, 1961; West Reading, Pennsylvania, US
- Died: April 7, 2024 (aged 62); Philadelphia, Pennsylvania, US

Lori Schappell and George Schappell (born Dori Schappell; September 18, 1961 – April 7, 2024), were American conjoined twins. On July 4, 2020, following the passing of Ronnie and Donnie Galyon, they became the oldest living conjoined twins in the world. They died in 2024, at the age of 62.

== Early life, family and education ==
Lori and George Schappell were born on September 18, 1961, in West Reading, Pennsylvania. Their parents were Ruth Geraldine Schappell (née Reppert) and Franklin George Schappell. They had six siblings. They were craniopagus conjoined twins joined at the head. Although they shared an area of scalp and blood vessels, their brains were distinct from each other. They had very different personalities and lived—insofar as possible—individual lives. George was unable to walk due to spina bifida.

They spent the first twenty-four years of their life in an institution for the mentally disabled, although they were not mentally disabled. They lived without assistance in high-rise apartments for the elderly in Reading, Pennsylvania from 1988 until their death in 2024. As a mark of individuality and disliking the fact that their names rhymed, George, then known as Dori, first chose to go by the name Reba after his favorite singer Reba McEntire.

The twins graduated from a public high school and later attended college classes.

== Careers ==
As a country music singer, George performed widely in the United States and visited Germany and Japan. In 1997, he won an L.A. Music Award for Best New Country Artist. He sang "The Fear of Being Alone" over the credits of Stuck on You, a comedy feature film about a pair of fictitious conjoined twins.

Lori acted as George's facilitator. She worked in a hospital laundry, arranging her workload around George's singing commitments. She said that, as a fan of George, she paid to attend concerts just like all the other fans, simply making herself quiet and "invisible" while George was performing.

As conjoined twins, Lori and George appeared in a number of television documentaries and talk shows. They also acted in an episode of the television series Nip/Tuck in which they played conjoined twins, Rose and Raven Rosenberg.

On June 21, 2007, Lori and George took part in the grand opening of Ripley's Believe It Or Not! Odditorium in Times Square, Manhattan, New York City. This was the first time they were billed as Lori and George Schappell, instead of Lori and Dori Schappell, or Lori and Reba Schappell.

== Personal lives and death ==
The Schappell twins lived in a two-bedroom apartment with each maintaining a distinct private space. They had several pets. Lori was a trophy-winning bowler. They respected each other's privacy in terms of work time, recreation and relationships. Lori had several boyfriends and was engaged but her fiancé died after a motor vehicle accident. They celebrated their 50th birthday with a trip to London, England.

George, formerly known as Dori and Reba, came out as a transgender man in 2007. Guinness World Records declared Lori and George to be the first set of conjoined twins to have different gender identities. Their family did not accept George's identity, as evidenced by his obituary and his mother's obituary; he was referred to as a daughter in both.

Lori and George Schappell died at University of Pennsylvania Hospital on April 7, 2024, at the age of 62. The cause of death was not publicly disclosed.

== Media ==
Lori and George appeared in the following programs or articles:

- 1993: The Maury Povich Show
- 1996: Jerry Springer
- September 8, 1997: Twins - The Divided Self (US Title: Body Doubles; The Twin Experience); Peabody Award winning documentary for ITV, HBO & CBC
- September 11, 1997: The Unexplained :"The Twin Connection", as Lori and Dori
- September 12, 1998: The Howard Stern Radio Show
- October 7, 1998: Howard Stern
- 1998: A&E documentary Face to Face: The Schappell Twins
- 2000: The Learning Channel documentary Separate Lives
- May 15, 2002: The Jerry Springer Show; George was billed as Reba Schappell
- August 17, 2004: American television show Nip/Tuck, in the episode "Rose and Raven Rosenberg"; Raven was played by George (billed as Reba) Schappell; Rose was played by Lori Schappell
- May 31, 2002: Howard Stern
- 2005 Television documentary: Medical Incredible. A documentary on Discovery Health Channel.
- 2005 Television documentary: Extraordinary People: Joined at the Head; George was billed as Dori Schappell
- September 24, 2007: The Greek reality show Aksizei na to deis (Worth Seeing – Αξιζει να το δεις)
- 2007: The romantic comedy film X's & O's
- 2007: Television documentary Inside Extraordinary Humans: Science of Conjoined Twins
- September 13, 2011: This Morning
