= Angela Little (actress) =

American model and actress (born 1972)

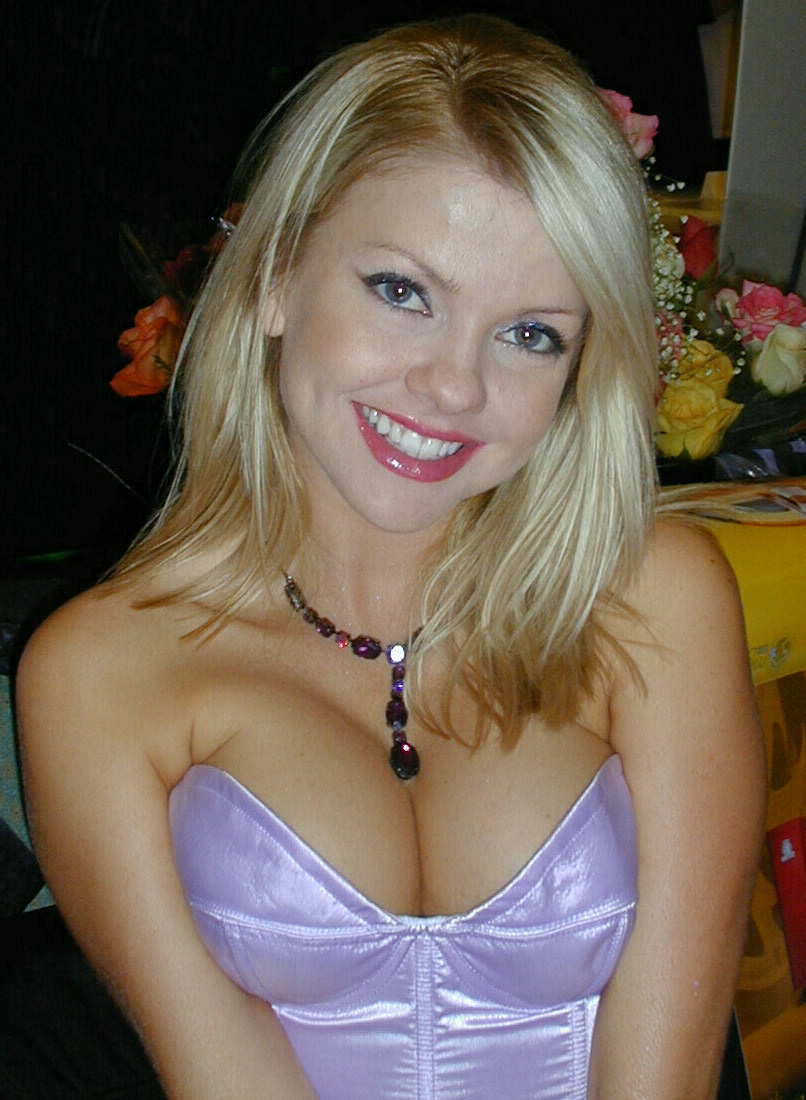

Playboy centerfold appearance
- August 1998
- Preceded by: Lisa Dergan
- Succeeded by: Vanessa Gleason

Personal details
- Born: Angela Michelle Little; July 22, 1972 (age 54) Albertville, Alabama, U.S.
- Height: 5 ft 2.5 in (1.59 m)

Angela Michelle Little (born July 22, 1972) is an American model and actress. She is Playboy's Playmate of the Month for August 1998, and she has appeared in several Playboy videos and special editions, working steadily for Playboy for more than five years following her centerfold appearance.

== Early life ==
Little was born in Albertville, Alabama.

== Career ==
Playboy magazine founder and publisher Hugh Hefner's nickname for Little was "Little Marilyn". Little has had roles in a number of mainstream films including Walk Hard starring John C. Reilly, American Pie: Band Camp, Rush Hour 2 and My Boss's Daughter. She has been a guest star in episodes of TV series such as Cold Case, CSI, Nip/Tuck, Monk, The Mullets, Charmed, Malcolm in the Middle, Reno 911! and the soap opera The Bold and the Beautiful, plus a role on the short-lived TV series Buddy Faro. She also hosted the E! Channel's Wild on the Windy City.

== Personal life ==
Little married actor and musician Andy Mackenzie on August 20, 2005. They are the parents of actress Farrah Mackenzie.

== Filmography ==
=== Film ===
Year	Title	Role	Notes
1998	Headless at the Fair	Lori	Short
1999	Speedway Junky	Bombshell #2	
1999	Hefner: Unauthorized	Karen Christy	TV movie
2001	Human Nature	Chester's Waitress	
2001	Rush Hour 2	Tex's Girlfriend	
2002	The Backlot Murders	Shayla	Video
2003	Pauly Shore Is Dead	Zoey's Friend #2	
2003	My Boss's Daughter	Sheryl	
2004	Busty Cops	Officer Ashley	Video
2005	Alabama Jones and the Busty Crusade	Alabama Jones	Video
2005	American Pie Presents: Band Camp	Sheree	Video
2006	The Gold Bracelet	Raina	
2006	Busty Cops 2	Ashley/Sandy Monica	Video
2007	Walk Hard: The Dewey Cox Story	Beth Anne	
2007	Larry the Cable Guy's Christmas Spectacular	Santa's Helper	TV movie
2008	Player 5150	Jenny	
2008	The Last Bad Neighborhood	Jewel	
2009	Larry the Cable Guy's Hula-Palooza Christmas Luau	Santa's Helper/Native Girl/Card Girl	TV movie
2011	The Great Fight	Jill Tantino	
2011	The Life Zone	Lara Posey	
2011	The Heart's Eye View	Fantasy Woman	Short
2014	Snapshot	Sienna Morgan	
2014	Scavenger Killers	Erin Woods	
2019	The Savant	Jill Tantino	

=== Television ===
Year	Title	Role	Notes
1998	Buddy Faro	Astra Lowe	Episode: "Death by Airbrush"
1999	Rude Awakening	Ginger	Episode: "Bosses, Burglars & Back Street Babes"
2001	Strip Mall	Audition Girl #2	Episode: "Hedda Bags Josh"
2002	Off Centre	Robin	Episode: "Why Chau Lives Alone"
2003	Charmed	Kaia	Episode: "The Importance of Being Phoebe"
2003	Malcolm in the Middle	Debbie	Episode: "Stereo Store"
2003	The Mullets	Bikini Girl	Episode: "Raging Waters"
2004	Quintuplets	Denise	Episode: "Where Are They Now?"
2006	The Bold and the Beautiful	Christy	Episode: "Episode #1.4716"
2006	CSI: Crime Scene Investigation	Tammy - Star	Episode: "Spellbound"
2006	Nip/Tuck	Blu Mondae	Episode: "Blu Mondae"
2006	Cold Case	Julie Livingston	Episode: "The Key"
2007	Monk	Kimberly Dennaman	Episode: "Mr. Monk Is on the Air"
2007	Reno 911!	Tammy	Episode: "The Department Gets a Corporate Sponsor"
2014	Idiotsitter	Tanzy	Recurring Cast

=== Video Game ===
Year	Title	Role	Notes
2011	L.A. Noire	Doris West	

Heather Kozar	Julia Schultz	Marliece Andrada	Holly Joan Hart	Deanna Brooks	Maria Luisa Gil
Lisa Dergan	Angela Little	Vanessa Gleason	Laura Cover	Tiffany Taylor	Dahm triplets
