= Nip/Tuck =

2003 American medical drama television series

- Genre: Medical drama
- Created by: Ryan Murphy
- Starring: Dylan Walsh; Julian McMahon; John Hensley; Joely Richardson; Valerie Cruz; Roma Maffia; Kelly Carlson; Jessalyn Gilsig; Bruno Campos
- Opening theme: "A Perfect Lie" by The Engine Room
- Composer: James S. Levine
- Country of origin: United States
- Original language: English
- No. of seasons: 6
- No. of episodes: 100 (list of episodes)

Production
- Executive producers: Ryan Murphy; Brad Falchuk; Lyn Greene; Greer Shephard; Michael M. Robin; Richard Levine; Sean Jablonski; Jennifer Salt
- Production location: Hollywood, Los Angeles
- Camera setup: Single-camera
- Running time: 42–60 minutes
- Production companies: Hands Down Entertainment; Ryan Murphy Productions; Stu Segall Productions; The Shephard/Robin Company; Warner Bros. Television

Original release
- Network: FX
- Release: July 22, 2003 – March 3, 2010

Related
- Mentiras perfectas

Nip/Tuck is an American medical drama television series created by Ryan Murphy that aired on FX in the United States for six seasons from 2003 to 2010. The series, which also incorporates elements of crime, black comedy, family drama, satire, and psychological thriller, focuses on "McNamara/Troy", a cutting-edge, controversial plastic surgery center, and follows the personal and professional lives of its founders Dr. Sean McNamara and Dr. Christian Troy (portrayed by Dylan Walsh and Julian McMahon, respectively). Each episode features graphic, partial depictions of the plastic surgeries on one or more patients, as well as developments in the doctors' personal lives. Focus is also given to McNamara/Troy's anesthesiologist Dr. Liz Cruz, Christian's many sexual partners, and Sean's family. With the exception of the pilot, each episode of the series is named after one of the patients scheduled to receive plastic surgery.

Unlike most medical dramas, Nip/Tuck used serial storytelling and often had story arcs spanning multiple seasons; for example, seasons two and three focused on a serial rapist known as The Carver, who often mutilates his victims' faces, leading McNamara/Troy to provide pro bono surgery to the victims.

The show premiered on July 22, 2003, and concluded on March 3, 2010, with the 100th episode. Despite being initially set in Miami, at the end of the fourth season, it was relocated to Los Angeles, and many of the characters followed along. The show earned 45 award nominations, winning one Golden Globe and one Emmy Award. Series creator Ryan Murphy said that the medical cases on the show are "100 percent based on fact".

== Overview ==
The drama is set in a plastic-surgery center, McNamara/Troy, focusing on the two doctors who own it. Sean McNamara (Dylan Walsh) often has problems in his marriage due to being seduced by beautiful women on a daily basis. His story follows his efforts to keep his family together despite his short-comings. His business partner Christian Troy (Julian McMahon), though, uses his charm to bring in potential female candidates and conducts vain business deals, almost never failing to end up with them in bed. Sean takes his job much more seriously and often must fix Christian's mistakes.

== Production ==
According to Ryan Murphy, the series was inspired by makeover episodes of the talk shows The Jenny Jones Show and The Oprah Winfrey Show.

In its debut season, Nip/Tuck was the highest-rated new series on American basic cable, and the highest-rated basic cable series of all time for the 18–49 and 25–54 age demographics.

The fifth season premiered on October 30, 2007, though production was affected by the 2007 Writers Strike. Accordingly, the second half of the fifth season was not screened until January 6, 2009, in the United States. Another 19 episodes were picked up by FX; airing on October 14, 2009. Following a three-week hiatus for the Christmas holidays, the show resumed in January 2010, and concluded on March 3, 2010, with its 100th episode.

Nip/Tuck filmed its 100th and final episode on June 12, 2009, without creator Ryan Murphy, who was, at the time, in India scouting locations for his film version of the memoir Eat, Pray, Love.

The show inspired the creation of the plastic-surgery reality show Dr. 90210.

== Cast and characters ==
=== Main cast ===
Actor	Character	Seasons					
Actor	Character	1	2	3	4	5	6
Dylan Walsh	Sean McNamara	Main	Main	Main	Main	Main	Main
Julian McMahon	Christian Troy	Main	Main	Main	Main	Main	Main
John Hensley	Matt McNamara	Main	Main	Main	Main	Main	Main
Joely Richardson	Julia McNamara	Main	Main	Main	Main	Main	Main
Valerie Cruz	Grace Santiago	Main					
Roma Maffia	Liz Cruz	Recurring	Main	Main	Main	Main	Main
Kelly Carlson	Kimber Henry	Recurring	Recurring	Main	Main	Main	Main
Jessalyn Gilsig	Gina Russo	Recurring	Recurring	Main	Special Guest	Special Guest	
Bruno Campos	Quentin Costa		Guest	Main			

=== Recurring cast ===
Actor	Character	Seasons					
Actor	Character	1	2	3	4	5	6
Kelsey Batelaan	Annie McNamara	Recurring	Recurring	Recurring	Recurring	Recurring	Recurring
Linda Klein	Nurse Linda	Recurring	Recurring	Recurring	Recurring	Recurring	Recurring
Robert LaSardo	Escobar Gallardo	Recurring	Guest		Recurring		Guest
Ruth Williamson	Mrs. Hedda Grubman	Recurring	Guest		Guest		
Joey Slotnick	Dr. Merrill Bobolit	Recurring	Guest		Guest		
Phillip Rhys	Jude Sawyer	Recurring	Guest	Guest			
Julie Warner	Megan O'Hara	Recurring	Guest		Guest		
Joshua & Josiah Henry	Wilber Troy		Recurring		Recurring	Recurring	Recurring
Vanessa Redgrave	Dr. Erica Noughton		Recurring	Recurring			Guest
Famke Janssen	Ava Moore		Recurring	Special Guest			Special Guest
Seth Gabel	Adrian Moore		Recurring				
Willam Belli	Cherry Peck			Recurring			
Rhona Mitra	Kit McGraw			Recurring			
Brittany Snow	Ariel Alderman			Recurring			
Sanaa Lathan	Michelle Landau				Recurring		
Jacqueline Bisset	James LeBeau				Recurring		
Peter Dinklage	Marlowe Sawyer				Recurring		
Rosie O'Donnell	Dawn Budge				Recurring	Recurring	
Mario Lopez	Dr. Mike Hamoui				Guest		Recurring
Paula Marshall	Kate Tinsley					Recurring	
Bradley Cooper	Aidan Stone					Recurring	
Portia de Rossi	Olivia Lord					Recurring	
AnnaLynne McCord	Eden Lord					Recurring	
John Schneider	Ram Peters					Recurring	
Sharon Gless	Colleen Rose					Recurring	
Katee Sackhoff (season 5); Rose McGowan (season 6)	Dr. Theodora "Teddy" Rowe					Recurring	Recurring
George Newbern	Dr. Curtis Ryerson						Recurring
Melonie Diaz	Ramona Perez						Recurring

== Episodes ==
Season	Episodes		Originally released	
Season	Episodes		First released	Last released
1	13		July 22, 2003	October 21, 2003
2	16		June 22, 2004	October 5, 2004
3	15		September 20, 2005	December 20, 2005
4	15		September 5, 2006	December 12, 2006
5	22	14	October 10, 2007	February 19, 2008
5	22	8	January 6, 2009	March 3, 2009
6	19		October 14, 2009	March 3, 2010

== Awards and nominations ==
Year	Award	Date of the ceremony	Category	Recipients	Result	Ref.
2004	Golden Globe Awards	25 January 2004	Best Television Series – Drama	Nip/Tuck	Nominated	
2004	Golden Globe Awards	25 January 2004	Best Actress – Television Series Drama	Joely Richardson	Nominated	
2004	Satellite Awards	21 February 2004	Best Television Series – Drama	Nip/Tuck	Nominated	
2004	Satellite Awards	21 February 2004	Best Actor – Television Series Drama	Julian McMahon	Nominated	
2004	Satellite Awards	21 February 2004	Best Actress – Television Series Drama	Joely Richardson	Nominated	
2004	GLAAD Media Awards	12 April 2004	Outstanding Drama Series	Nip/Tuck	Nominated	
2004	Primetime Emmy Awards	19 September 2004	Outstanding Directing for a Drama Series	Ryan Murphy (for "Pilot")	Nominated	
2004	Primetime Emmy Awards	19 September 2004	Outstanding Main Title Design	Eric Anderson, Vince Haycock, Paul Matthaeus and Paul Schneider	Nominated	
2004	Primetime Emmy Awards	19 September 2004	Outstanding Original Main Title Theme Music	Jeffrey Cain, Cedric Lemoyne and Gregory Slay	Nominated	
2004	Primetime Emmy Awards	19 September 2004	Outstanding Prosthetic Makeup	Thomas R. Burman, Bari Dreiband-Burman and James MacKinnon (for "Pilot")	Won	
2004	Primetime Emmy Awards	19 September 2004	Outstanding Makeup for a Series (Non-Prosthetic)	Eryn Krueger Mekash, Stephanie A. Fowler, Thomas R. Burman, Bari Dreiband-Burman (for "Adelle Coffin)	Nominated	
2005	Golden Globe Awards	16 January 2005	Best Television Series – Drama	Nip/Tuck	Won	
2005	Golden Globe Awards	16 January 2005	Best Actor – Television Series Drama	Julian McMahon	Nominated	
2005	Golden Globe Awards	16 January 2005	Best Actress – Television Series Drama	Joely Richardson	Nominated	
2005	Producers Guild of America Awards	22 January 2005	Best Episodic Drama	Nip/Tuck	Nominated	
2005	Satellite Awards	23 January 2005	Best Television Series – Drama	Nip/Tuck	Won	
2005	Satellite Awards	23 January 2005	Best Actress – Television Series Drama	Joely Richardson	Nominated	
2005	Costume Designers Guild	19 February 2005	Excellence in Contemporary Television	Lou Eyrich	Nominated	
2005	Saturn Awards	3 May 2005	Best Syndicated/Cable Television Series	Nip/Tuck	Nominated	
2005	Saturn Awards	3 May 2005	Best Actor on Television	Julian McMahon	Nominated	
2005	BMI Film & TV Awards	18 May 2005	BMI Cable Award	James S. Levine	Won	
2005	Primetime Emmy Awards	18 September 2005	Outstanding Guest Actress in a Drama Series	Jill Clayburgh (for "Bobbi Broderick" and "Naomi Gaines")	Nominated	
2005	Primetime Emmy Awards	18 September 2005	Outstanding Casting for a Drama Series	Eric Dawson, Carol Kritzer and Robert J. Ulrich	Nominated	
2005	Primetime Emmy Awards	18 September 2005	Outstanding Prosthetic Makeup	Eryn Krueger Mekash, Stephanie A. Fowler, Mary Kay Morse, Thomas R. Burman, Bari Dreiband-Burman (for "Christian Troy")	Nominated	
2005	Primetime Emmy Awards	18 September 2005	Outstanding Makeup (Non-Prosthetic)	Eryn Krueger Mekash and Stephanie A. Fowler (for "Julia McNamara")	Nominated	
2005	Satellite Awards	17 December 2005	Best Television Series – Drama	Nip/Tuck	Won	
2005	Satellite Awards	17 December 2005	Best Actor – Television Series Drama	Dylan Walsh	Nominated	
2005	Satellite Awards	17 December 2005	Best Actress – Television Series Drama	Joely Richardson	Nominated	
2006	Writers Guild of America Awards	4 February 2006	Television: Episodic Drama	Jennifer Salt (for "Rhea Reynolds")	Nominated	
2006	Costume Designers Guild	25 February 2006	Excellence in Contemporary Television	Lou Eyrich	Nominated	
2006	Young Artist Awards	25 March 2006	Best Performance in a TV series – Guest Starring Young Actor (Comedy or Drama)	Tanner Richie	Nominated	
2006	Saturn Awards	2 May 2006	Best Syndicated/Cable Television Series	Nip/Tuck	Nominated	
2006	Saturn Awards	2 May 2006	Best Actor on Television	Julian McMahon	Nominated	
2006	Primetime Creative Arts Emmy Awards	19 August 2006	Outstanding Art Direction for a Single-Camera Series	Liz Kay and Ellen Brill (for "Ben White")	Nominated	
2006	Primetime Creative Arts Emmy Awards	19 August 2006	Outstanding Prosthetic Makeup	Eryn Krueger Mekash, Stephanie A. Fowler, Mary Kay Morse, Thomas R. Burman, Bari Dreiband-Burman (for "Cherry Peck")	Nominated	
2006	Primetime Creative Arts Emmy Awards	19 August 2006	Outstanding Makeup (Non-Prosthetic)	Eryn Krueger, Stephanie Fowler, Debbie Zoller, and Michele Tyminski (for "Quentin Costa")	Nominated	
2007	NAACP Image Awards	2 March 2007	Outstanding Supporting Actress in a Drama Series	Sanaa Lathan	Nominated	
2007	Primetime Creative Arts Emmy Awards	8 September 2007	Outstanding Prosthetic Makeup	Eryn Krueger, Stephanie Fowler, Bill Corso, Mary Kay Witt, Christopher Nelson, and Christien Tinsley (for "Conor McNamara")	Nominated	
2007	AACTA Awards	6 December 2007	Best Actor – International	Julian McMahon	Nominated	
2007	Satellite Awards	16 December 2007	Best DVD Release of a TV Show	Nip/Tuck	Nominated	
2008	Primetime Creative Arts Emmy Awards	13 September 2008	Outstanding Guest Actor in a Drama Series	Oliver Platt	Nominated	
2008	Primetime Creative Arts Emmy Awards	13 September 2008	Outstanding Guest Actress in a Drama Series	Sharon Gless	Nominated	
2009	Primetime Creative Arts Emmy Awards	12 September 2009	Outstanding Prosthetic Makeup	David Dupuis, Thomas R. Burman and Bari Dreiband-Burman (for "Budi Sabri")	Nominated	
2009	Primetime Creative Arts Emmy Awards	12 September 2009	Outstanding Makeup (Non-Prosthetic)	Eryn Krueger Mekash and Stephanie A. Fowler (for "Giselle Blaylock And Legend Chandler")	Nominated	
2010	Primetime Creative Arts Emmy Awards	21 August 2010	Outstanding Prosthetic Makeup	Thomas R. Burman, Bari Dreiband-Burman, Thomas Floutz, Stephanie A. Fowler, Bart Mixon, Michele Tyminski Schoenbach, Vincent Van Dyke, and Michele Tyminski Schoenbach (for Enigma")	Nominated	

== U.S. television ratings ==
Viewer numbers (based on average total viewers per episode) of Nip/Tuck on FX.

Season	Time slot	Season premiere			Season finale			Viewers Total (in millions)	Viewers Age 18–49 (in millions)
Season	Time slot	Date	Viewers Total (in millions)	Viewers 18–49 (in millions)	Date	Viewers Total (in millions)	Viewers 18–49 (in millions)	Viewers Total (in millions)	Viewers Age 18–49 (in millions)
1st	Tuesday 10:00 pm	July 22, 2003	3.7	2.0	October 21, 2003	2.99	2.1	3.25	2.2
2nd	Tuesday 10:00 pm	June 22, 2004	3.8	2.7	October 5, 2004	5.2	3.6	3.8	2.6
3rd	Tuesday 10:00 pm	September 20, 2005	5.3	3.7	December 20, 2005	5.7	3.9	3.9	2.7
4th	Tuesday 10:00 pm	September 5, 2006	4.8	3.4	December 12, 2006	3.38	2.38	3.9	2.75
5th – Part I	Tuesday 10:00 pm	October 30, 2007	4.3	3.5	February 19, 2008	N/A	2.41	N/A	N/A
5th – Part II	Tuesday 10:00 pm	January 6, 2009	3.1	2.4	March 3, 2009	3.8	2.4	N/A	N/A
6th	Wednesday 10:00 pm	October 14, 2009	2.9	1.9	March 3, 2010	1.8			

Nip/Tuck became an instant cable hit from its 2003 series premiere.

For its third season, FX aired Nip/Tuck solely in the fall of 2005, instead of during the summer season, like the two years prior. John Landgraf, president of FX, stated that such a move was a "huge risk", since it stacked up "against the full barrage of fall network competition". Despite some criticism on its third season, the story arc involving The Carver attracted even more of an audience to the series than any of the seasons before, reaching its climax in a December 20, 2005, two-hour season finale, entitled "Cherry Peck/Quentin Costa", which became the most-watched scripted program in the history of the FX network.

Including "Cherry Peck/Quentin Costa", three episodes of Nip/Tuck rank as the three most-watched scripted programs ever on FX. The second-season finale, entitled "Joan Rivers", which aired on October 5, 2004, drew 5.2 million viewers. It was then eclipsed on September 20, 2005, when the third-season premiere, entitled "Momma Boone", drew roughly 5.3 million viewers. Three months later on December 20, 2005, the aforementioned third-season finale, entitled "Cherry Peck / Quentin Costa", drew 5.7 million viewers. Of those 5.7 million viewers, 3.9 million were in the 18–49 age group demographic, "making the finale the number-one episode among the key advertising demographic of any cable series in 2005. It's also the largest demographic number for any single telecast in the network's history," according to Zap2It.

According to the September 8, 2006, Mediaweek column "The Programming Insider", "the fourth-season premiere on Tuesday, September 5, 2006, averaged 4.8 million total viewers and 3.4 million adults 18–49, building over its season-three average by 25% and 26%, respectively. Nip/Tuck's performance among adults 18–49 ranks as basic cable's top-rated season premiere in the demographic for 2006, as of September 8, 2006."

== Broadcast ==
In Australia, the series was broadcast on Showcase and Nine Network; in Canada on CTV and Series+; in France on M6; in New Zealand on TV One, TV2 and Canterbury Television. In Ireland, the series commenced broadcast on TG4 from 2 June 2004.

In the United Kingdom, Sky One acquired the series just a few weeks ahead of its American debut, on 8 July 2003, and premiered in the 10:00pm time slot on 13 January 2004. In August 2004, Nip/Tuck began airing on Channel 4, who had already acquired the free-to-air rights to the series before Sky announced they had the first-run pay TV rights. They only aired the first two seasons before dropping the show from its lineup. In 2007, Nip/Tuck moved from Sky One to the British version of the show's home network, FX. It has also since aired on Sky Living.

Nip/Tuck premiered in South Africa on M-Net in January 2004. It moved to DStv's M-Net Series channel for the fifth season. The series later aired on SABC 3 in 2007.

== Home media ==
The entire series of Nip/Tuck is available on DVD; in the United States (Region 1), all six seasons, as well as a complete series set, were released through Warner Bros. Home Entertainment between 2004 and 2010. The fifth season, however, was the only season to be made available in two parts. This was due to the 2007–08 Writers Guild of America strike, forcing the season to go into hiatus mid-broadcast. While the season was still airing, it was announced that the DVD set for the complete fifth season was due for release on May 20, 2008. Instead of releasing the complete season once the remaining episodes had aired, Warner Bros. opted to release the first 14 episodes of season five in one set, while the remaining 8 episodes were made available in a separate set following eventual broadcast. A complete fifth season set had never been released in the United States. All six seasons have also been distributed in the UK (Region 2), Australia and New Zealand (Region 4) via Warner Bros., where the fifth season was released as complete in those countries.

Additionally, season four of Nip/Tuck was released on both Blu-ray and HD DVD formats in the United States, on September 4, 2007, and was the only season to receive these releases.

DVD release overview
Season	Release date			Additional features
Season	Region 1	Region 2	Region 4	Additional features
The Complete First Season	June 15, 2004	September 9, 2004	October 20, 2004	5-disc set; BBFC rating: 18; ACB rating: MA15+; Special features: 3 making-of documentaries; Giving Melodrama a Facelift; Realistic Expectations: The Practice of Plastic Surgery; Are They Real or Fake?: Miraculous Makeup Effects and of Nip/Tuck; Severed Parts gag reel; Cutting room floor deleted scenes; A Perfect Lie music video. Teaser trailer.
The Complete Second Season	August 30, 2005	May 30, 2005	July 13, 2005	6-disc set (Region 1); 5-disc set (Regions 2 & 4); BBFC rating: 18; ACB rating: MA15+; Special features: Cutting room floor: Deleted scenes; Featurette: Recurring Pain: Three Women and Their Man
The Complete Third Season	August 29, 2006	May 8, 2006	May 2, 2007	6-disc set; BBFC rating: 18; ACB rating: MA15+; Special features: Severed Parts - unaired scenes; 2 featurettes; Chasing the Carver; The Perfect Look: Set Design
The Complete Fourth Season	September 4, 2007	August 13, 2007	July 2, 2008	5-disc set; BBFC rating: 18; ACB rating: MA15+; Special features: Cutting Room Floor - unaired scenes; Clever casting: The season's guest stars; Sizzle: the sexuality of Nip/Tuck.; The cutting edge: how real-life dramas are incorporated into the show; Severed parts: gag reel
Season Five, Part One	December 30, 2008	—N/a	—N/a	5-disc set; Special features: Hollywood Hedonism: The Transition from Miami to Hollywood; Cutting Room Floor: Unaired scenes; Severed parts: gag reel
Season Five, Part Two	October 6, 2009	—N/a	—N/a	3-disc set; Special features: Featurette: The Science of Beauty
The Complete Fifth Season	—N/a	January 18, 2010	October 28, 2009	8-disc set; BBFC rating: 18; ACB rating: MA15+; Special features: Hollywood Hedonism: The Transition from Miami to Hollywood; Cutting Room Floor: Unaired scenes; Severed parts: gag reel; Featurette: The Science of Beauty
The Complete Sixth and Final Season	June 8, 2010	September 6, 2010	February 2, 2011	5-disc set; BBFC rating: 18; ACB rating: MA15+; Special features: Deleted scenes; Featurette; Gag reel
The Complete Series	November 2, 2010	September 5, 2016	TBA	35-disc set (Region 1); 34-disc set (Region 2); BBFC rating: 18; Special features from individual season box sets

== International adaptation ==
In 2013, the Colombian network Caracol Televisión produced the Spanish language adaptation of the series, titled Mentiras perfectas (Perfect Lies).
