= John Hensley =

American actor (born 1977)

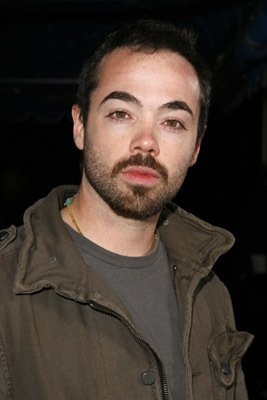
- Hensley in 2008
- Born: John Carter Hensley; August 29, 1977 (age 48); Hyden, Kentucky, U.S.
- Other name: John C. Hensley
- Occupation: Actor
- Years active: 1999–present

John Carter Hensley (born August 29, 1977) is an American actor, best known for his role as Matt McNamara on Nip/Tuck.

== Filmography ==
Film
Year	Title	Role	Notes
2001	Campfire Stories	Donny	
2006	Fifty Pills	Coleman	
2007	Teeth	Brad	
2008	Shutter	Adam	
2009	Chains	John	
2009	Peoples	Oliver Anderson	
2011	Hostel: Part III	Justin	
2014	Mall	Lenny	

Television
Year	Title	Role	Notes
1999	Strangers with Candy	Student	Episode: "The Trip Back"
2000	Madigan Men	Luke Madigan	Main role; 12 episodes
2000	The Sopranos	Eric Scatino	Episode: "The Happy Wanderer"
2001–2002	Witchblade	Gabriel Bowman	Main role; 19 episodes
2003–2010	Nip/Tuck	Matt McNamara	Main role; 66 episodes
2005	World Poker Tour	Himself	Episode: "Hollywood Home Game 34"
2007	CSI: Crime Scene Investigation	Jesse Hottman	Episode: "Meet Market"
2008	Up Close with Carrie Keagan	Himself	1 episode
2013	Sons of Anarchy	Yates	Episode: "Wolfsangel"
2014	The Mentalist	Anthony Tremel	Episode: "Black Hearts"
2017–2018	How to Get Away with Murder	Ronald Miller	11 episodes
2018	9-1-1	David	1 episode
2021	The Good Doctor	Oscar	Episode: "Teeny Blue Eyes"
