= Roma Maffia =

American actress

- Born: May 31, 1958 (age 68)
- Occupation: Actress
- Years active: 1982–present

Roma Maffia (born May 31, 1958) is an American actress, best known for playing Grace Alvarez on Profiler (1996-2000) and Liz Cruz on Nip/Tuck (2003–2010).

== Life and career ==
Roma Maffia grew up in Brooklyn, New York and is of mixed English, German and West Indian descent. Her Italian surname reportedly comes from her stepfather.

Maffia is a 1973 graduate of St. Michael Academy. She began her official acting career in off-Broadway and off-off-Broadway productions. In 1994, she played Carmen in director Ron Howard's film The Paper. Soon after, she landed a role on the television series Chicago Hope. Maffia's television career continued as she played Grace Alvarez, the forensic pathologist for the Violent Crimes Task Force for four seasons on Profiler. She has had guest-starring and recurring roles on shows such as ER, The West Wing, and Law & Order.

Her most widely seen performances may be playing Seattle attorney Catherine Alvarez in the 1994 film Disclosure, starring Michael Douglas and Demi Moore. She followed this with a series of performances as Vanessa Galiano in the TV series Law & Order and as Judge Victoria Peyton on Boston Legal.

From 2003 until 2010, Maffia appeared as Liz Cruz on the FX Network series Nip/Tuck, the anesthesiologist colleague of two dysfunctional plastic surgeons. Maffia and Julian McMahon also worked together on the TV show Profiler. She had a supporting role on Pretty Little Liars from seasons 4 to 7. Her character, Linda Tanner, is a savvy, no-nonsense state investigator working on unsolved murder cases in the fictional town of Rosewood, Pennsylvania.

In 2012, Roma appeared in several episodes of Grey's Anatomy. She appeared in Season 4 of In the Dark as Paula Romano, a drug dealer who deals a drug called "Bolt" both in and out of prison.

== Filmography ==
=== Film ===
Year	Title	Role	Notes
1982	Smithereens	Prostitute	
1983	Stuck on You!	Attila's Sister	
1988	Married to the Mob	Angie's First Customer	
1990	Internal Affairs	Diane	
1991	American Blue Note	Marie	
1994	The Paper	Carmen	
1994	Disclosure	Catherine Alvarez	
1995	Nick of Time	Ms. Jones	
1996	Eraser	Claire Isaacs	
1997	Kiss the Girls	Dr. Ruocco	
1999	Double Jeopardy	Margaret Skolowski	
2000	Things You Can Tell Just by Looking at Her	Debbie	Segment: "Love Waits For Kathy"
2001	The New Women	Virginia VanUpp	
2001	I Am Sam	First Family Court Judge	uncredited
2002	Treading Water	The Agent	
2003	Holes	Atty. Carla Morengo	
2007	Totally Baked: A Pot-U-Mentary	Dr. Willa Peterson	
2007	Ghost ImageI	Detective Amos	
2008	Yonkers Joe	Santini	
2009	The Blue Tooth Virgin	Dr. Christopher	
2009	Kingshighway	Rosa	
2013	The Call	Maddy	
2022	Measure of Revenge	Mona	Post-production
2026	One Night Only	Store Owner	

=== Television ===
Year	Title	Role	Notes
1985	The Equalizer	Sindee	Episode: "Desperately"
1986	The Equalizer	Sindee	Episode: "Dead Drop"
1993	The X-Files	Uncredited	Episode: "Born Again"
1993	The Young Indiana Jones Chronicles	New York Cabbie	Episode: "Young Indiana Jones and the Scandal of 1920"
1994–1995	Chicago Hope	Angela Giandamenicio	6 episodes "Pilot" "Over the Rainbow" "Food Chains" "With the Greatest of Ease" "You Gotta Have Heart" "Great White Hope"
1995	Her Deadly Rival	Officer Caldwell	TV film
1995	The Heidi Chronicles		TV film
1995	Courthouse	Ms. Marino	3 episodes "Order on the Court" "One Strike and You're Out" "Injustice for All"
1996	Wings	Claire Barnett	Episode: "Porno for Pyros"
1996	Her Costly Affair	Sally Canter	NBC TV film
1996	Mistrial	Laurie Meisinger	TV film
1996–2000	Profiler	Grace Alvarez	82 episodes
1997	The Defenders: Payback	Julie Bishop	TV film
1998	The Daily Show	Herself	Episode dated 06-23-98
1998	Welcome to Paradox	Barbara Cloak	Episode: "Research Alpha"
1998	Route 9	Agent Ellen Marks	TV film
2000	The David Cassidy Story	Ruth Aarons	TV film
2001	The West Wing	Officer Rhonda Sachs	Episode: "Somebody's Going to Emergency, Somebody's Going to Jail"
2001	Gideon's Crossing	Valerie Thomlinson	Episode: "Freak Shows"
2001	The Division	Sandra	Episode: "Intervention"
2001	Ally McBeal	Werner's Attorney	Episode: "Fear of Flirting"
2001	ER	Ms. Prager	3 episodes "Partly Cloudy, Chance of Rain" "Quo Vadis?" "I'll be Home for Christmas"
2002	Judging Amy	Amanda York	Episode: "Tidal Wave"
2002	Taina	Gladys	Episode: "The Fear Factors"
2002	For the People	Sophia	Episode: "Lonely Hearts"
2002	Endgame: Ethics and Values in America	Julia	TV film
2002	The Sopranos	Professor Longo-Murphy	Episode: "Christopher"
2002	CSI: Crime Scene Investigation	Adelle Cross	Episode: "Fight Night"
2003	Boomtown	Sally Jacobson	Episode: "Inadmissible"
2003–2006	Law & Order	Vanessa Galliano	3 episodes "Ill-Conceived" "The Dead Wives Club" "Cost of Capital"
2003–2010	Nip/Tuck	Dr. Elizabeth "Liz" Troy Cruz	Series Regular
2004	Century City	Janice Cahn	Episode: "To Know Her"
2005	Strong Medicine	Rafael's mother	Episode: "Dying Inside"
2006	Ghost Whisperer	Dr. Hillary Sloan	Episode: "The Ghost Within"
2007–2008	Boston Legal	Judge Victoria Peyton	9 episodes
2009	Dexter	Marriage Therapist	Episode: "If I Had a Hammer"
2009	Criminal Minds	Det. Reese Evans	Episode: "Conflicted"
2009	Eastwick	Mme. Aleksandra	Episode: "Madams and Madames"
2011	Off the Map	Matilda	Episode: "Everything's as It Should Be"
2012	Grey's Anatomy	Roberta Thompson	4 episodes
2013–2017	Pretty Little Liars	Linda Tanner	17 episodes
2013, 2025	NCIS	NCIS Special Agent Vera Strickland	Episodes: "Under the Radar" & "Now & Then"
2016	Queen Sugar	Estelle Peterson	2 episodes
2018	Bull	Hazel Diaz	Episode: "Witness for the Prosecution"
2020	High Maintenance	Chick	2 episodes
2020	Billions	Mary Ann Gramm	2 episodes
2022	In the Dark	Paula Romano	5 episodes
2022-2025	The Equalizer	Dr Willa Roszak	5 Episodes
2023	Bookie	Nancy	Episode: "Nepo Bookies"
