= Julian McMahon =

Australian and American actor (1968–2025)

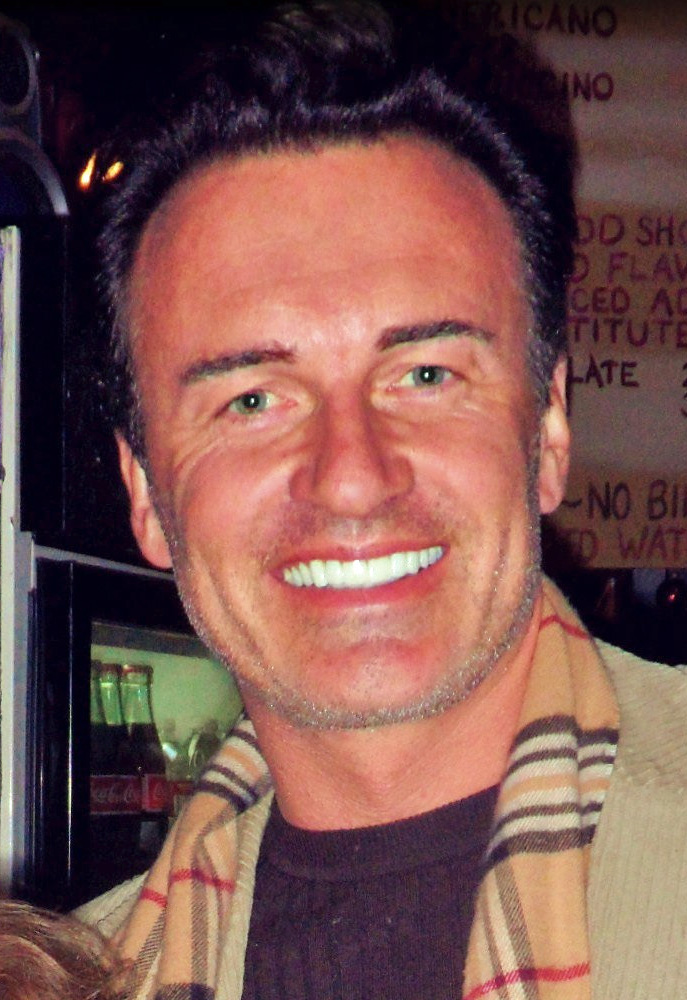
- McMahon in 2011
- Born: Julian Dana William McMahon; 27 July 1968; Sydney, New South Wales, Australia
- Died: 2 July 2025 (aged 56); Clearwater, Florida, US
- Citizenship: Australia; United States
- Occupation: Actor
- Years active: 1989–2025
- Known for: Home and Away; Charmed; Nip/Tuck; Fantastic Four; Runaways; FBI: Most Wanted
- Spouses: Dannii Minogue (m. 1994; div. 1995) Brooke Burns (m. 1999; div. 2001) Kelly Paniagua (m. 2014)
- Children: 1
- Parents: William McMahon (father); Sonia McMahon (mother)
- Relatives: See McMahon family

Julian Dana William McMahon (Note: /məkˈmɑːn/ mək-MAHN) (27 July 1968 – 2 July 2025) was an Australian and American actor. He was the only son of William McMahon, a former prime minister of Australia. He was known for his television roles as Ben Lucini in Home and Away, Detective John Grant in Profiler, Cole Turner in Charmed, Dr. Christian Troy in Nip/Tuck and Jess LaCroix in FBI: Most Wanted. His film roles include Doctor Doom in the Fantastic Four duology, Premonition, Red, and The Surfer. For his performance in Nip/Tuck, McMahon was nominated for the Golden Globe for Best Actor in a Television Drama Series.

== Early life and education ==
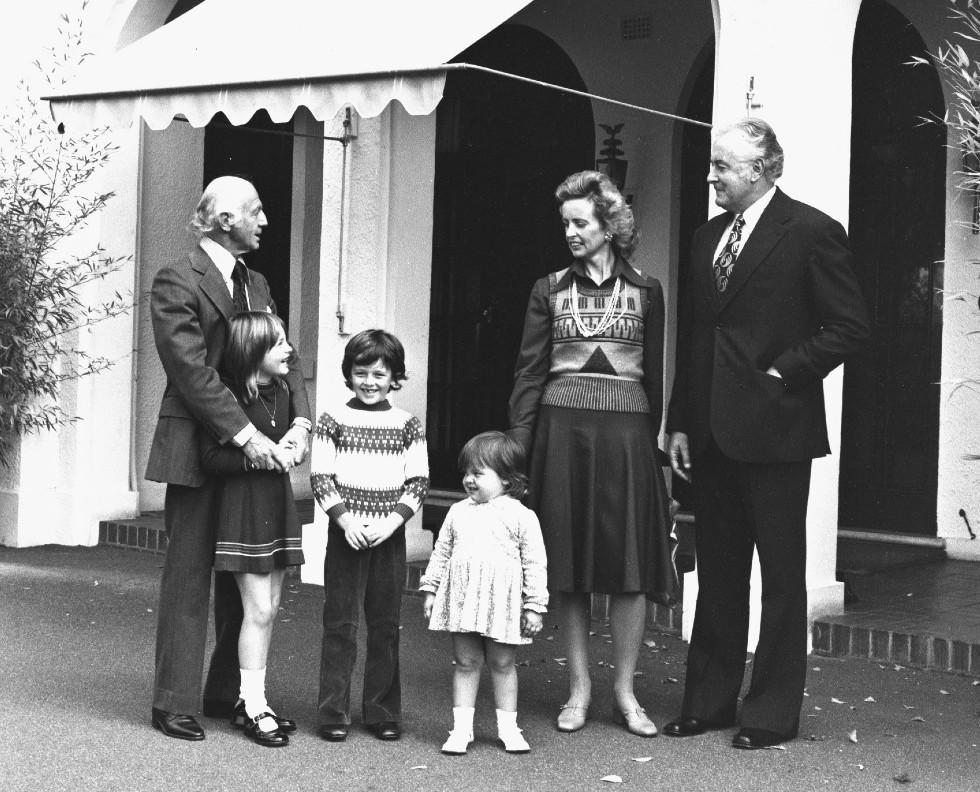
William and Sonia McMahon with their children (Julian in the middle) and Prime Minister Gough Whitlam (on right) at the Lodge in 1975

Julian Dana William McMahon was born in Sydney on 27 July 1968, the son of Sonia (née Hopkins), an heiress, socialite and fashion icon and William McMahon, a prominent Australian politician. His father was a Member of the Australian House of Representatives and a high-ranking minister in the 23-year Liberal government for many years before Julian's birth; he became the 20th prime minister of Australia on 10 March 1971, when Julian was two years old. His mother left their three children in the care of a nanny to be with her husband in Canberra during his prime ministership. He had two sisters and was of Irish descent through his father.

In an interview with the Herald Sun in 2018, McMahon discussed his childhood: "My Dad... was born in 1908. That's a very different time to what it was when he was raising me. He must have gone through a strange misunderstanding of how you were parented in 1908 versus how you parent in 1972; it would have been so conflicting. Also how you be a husband in that period of time would have been different."

McMahon was educated at the private, boys-only, Sydney Grammar School, which his father had attended. As a child, he dreamed of being an army cadet and playing rugby. McMahon briefly studied law at the University of Sydney and economics at the University of Wollongong. McMahon started modeling at age 17 and travelled to fashion hubs including Los Angeles, New York, Milan, Rome, and Paris.

McMahon was working in Europe when his father died in 1988 and returned to Australia for the funeral. While home, he filmed some Levi's commercials which helped him land a role on the Australian soap opera Home and Away.

== Career ==
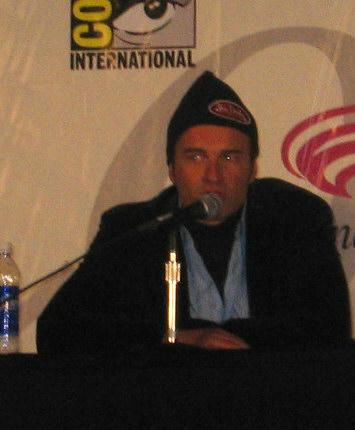
McMahon attending a Q&A session at Comic-Con

McMahon made his television acting debut in the short-lived daytime soap opera The Power, The Passion, where he played Kane Edmonds. He joined the cast of Home and Away as soldier Benito "Ben" Lucini in late 1989, with his first episode airing in February 1990. McMahon chose not to renew his contract, which expired in December 1990 and he departed along with Sharyn Hodgson, who played his on-screen wife Carly Lucini.

In the early 1990s, McMahon struggled to obtain a work permit for the United States and as a result he missed out on a few roles. McMahon's big break Hollywood role was on the soap opera Another World when he was cast as Ian Rain in 1993. The first scene he shot in New York for the show had him emerge from a pool in speedos at the Cory Mansion. He remembered the experience as "pretty magical".

McMahon won recognition for his portrayals in American television dramas, such as Detective John Grant in the crime drama Profiler (1996–2000), Cole Turner in the supernatural drama Charmed (2000–2003) and Dr. Christian Troy in the medical drama Nip/Tuck (2003–2010). He also appeared in films with leading and supporting roles, such as Chasing Sleep (2000) alongside Jeff Daniels, Doctor Doom in the Fantastic Four duology (2005 and 2007), Premonition (2007) alongside Sandra Bullock, Red (2010) alongside Bruce Willis, Faces in the Crowd (2011) alongside Milla Jovovich, and Bait 3D (2012) alongside Sharni Vinson and Phoebe Tonkin.

According to McMahon, he was one of the actors in the running to replace Pierce Brosnan as James Bond. Nip/Tuck garnered him a nomination for the Golden Globe for Best Actor in a Television Drama Series.

In 2018, McMahon returned to Australia to film Swinging Safari in Queensland, alongside Guy Pearce, Kylie Minogue, Radha Mitchell, Asher Keddie and Jeremy Sims. The film is set in the 1970s and sees McMahon sport a handlebar moustache. McMahon and his former sister-in-law Kylie Minogue share an improvised kiss in a scene where couples partner swap. He stated that he had found it difficult speaking with an Australian accent in the film because the majority of his career he had adapted to performing with an American accent.

From 2020 to 2022, McMahon starred as Jess LaCroix in the CBS crime drama FBI: Most Wanted. He stated that when he received the script for the series from CBS, he had an "aha moment" and knew he had to play the character. He also made guest appearances in parent series FBI and in spin-off FBI: International. McMahon departed the series mid-way through the third season; his final episode, "Shattered", aired 8 March 2022.

Most of McMahon's roles were villains or damaged characters, roles to which he felt attracted.

McMahon's final acting role was in The Residence in 2025; the show was subsequently cancelled on the same day of his death.

== Personal life ==
In 1994, McMahon married singer and actress Dannii Minogue after meeting on the set of Home and Away in 1991. The newlyweds spent a great deal of their marriage apart, due to McMahon pursuing his roles in the U.S. and Minogue following her music career in the United Kingdom. They divorced a year and a half later, with Minogue stating that her negative relationship with McMahon's mother, Sonia, had been an issue from the beginning.

In 1999, McMahon married Baywatch star Brooke Burns. The couple had one daughter together before divorcing in 2001. McMahon married for the third time in 2014 to Kelly Paniagua.

McMahon resided in the United States from the 1990s until his death but said his soul was still Australian: "I feel like I'm Australian on the inside and American on the outside or something. I would never want to leave it behind either. I love Australians, Australianisms, I love my part of being Australian. I love where I grew up and how I grew up and, you know, I wouldn't change it for the world." He became a citizen of the United States via naturalisation, but retained Australian citizenship.

== Death ==
McMahon died from lung metastasis caused by head and neck cancer, in Clearwater, Florida, on 2 July 2025, at age 56. He had not disclosed his diagnosis publicly. His remains were cremated.. His Charmed co-stars Rose McGowan, Holly Marie Combs, Brian Krause, and Alyssa Milano paid tribute to McMahon.

Ioan Gruffudd and Michael Chiklis, his co-stars in the Fantastic Four films paid tribute to him on social media. His Nip/Tuck co-stars Dylan Walsh, Joely Richardson and Kelly Carlson also paid tribute to him on social media.

== Filmography ==
=== Film ===
Year	Title	Role	Notes	Ref.
1992	Exchange Lifeguards	Mick		
1996	Magenta	Michael Walsch		
1998	In Quiet Night	Hayes		
2000	Chasing Sleep	George Simian		
2004	Meet Market	Hutch		
2005	Fantastic Four	Victor von Doom / Doctor Doom		
2007	Premonition	Jim Hanson		
2007	Prisoner	Derek Plato		
2007	Fantastic Four: Rise of the Silver Surfer	Victor von Doom / Doctor Doom		
2010	Red	Robert Stanton		
2011	Faces in the Crowd	Sam Kerrest		
2012	Bait 3D	Doyle		
2012	Fire with Fire	Robert	Direct to video	
2013	Paranoia	Miles Meechum		
2014	You're Not You	Liam		
2018	Swinging Safari	Rick Jones		
2018	Monster Party	Patrick Dawson		
2024	The Surfer	Scally		
2024	The Supremes at Earl's All-You-Can-Eat	Ray		
2024	The Deb	Australian Prime Minister	Cameo	

=== Television ===
Year	Title	Role	Notes	Ref.
1989	Rafferty's Rules	Police witness	Episode: "That Old Black Magic"	
1989	The Power, The Passion	Kane Edmonds	Main role	
1990–1991	Home and Away	Ben Lucini	Main role (seasons 3–4)	
1992	G.P.	Colin "Clutch" Carmody	Episode: "Beat It"	
1993	Another World	Ian Rain	Main role	
1996–2000	Profiler	John Grant	Main role	
1998	Will & Grace	Guy	Episode: "Where There's a Will, There's No Way"	
2000–2005	Charmed	Cole Turner	Main role (seasons 3–5); guest (season 7)	
2001	Another Day	David	Television film	
2003–2010	Nip/Tuck	Dr. Christian Troy	Main role	
2008	Robot Chicken	Doctor Doom	Voice; episode: "Monstourage"	
2012	Rogue	Kevin Lear	Television film	
2013	Full Circle	Stanley	3 episodes	
2015	Childhood's End	Rupert Boyce	Episode: "The Deceivers"	
2016	Hunters	McCarthy	6 episodes	
2016	Dirk Gently's Holistic Detective Agency	Patrick Spring	3 episodes	
2017–2018	Runaways	Jonah / Magistrate	Recurring role (season 1); main role (season 2)	
2019–2021	FBI	FBI SSA Jess LaCroix	3 episodes	
2020–2022	FBI: Most Wanted	FBI SSA Jess LaCroix	Main role (seasons 1–3)	
2021	FBI: International	FBI SSA Jess LaCroix	2 episodes	
2025	The Residence	Stephen Roos	Recurring role	

=== Video games ===
Year	Title	Role	Notes	Ref.
2005	Fantastic Four	Victor Von Doom / Dr Doom	Voice role	

== Awards and nominations ==
Year	Nominated work	Award	Result	Ref.
2003	Nip/Tuck	Satellite Award for Best Actor – Television Series Drama	Nominated	
2004	Nip/Tuck	Gold Derby Awards - Drama Lead Actor	Nominated	
2004	Nip/Tuck	Golden Globe Award for Best Actor – Television Series Drama	Nominated	
2005	Nip/Tuck	Saturn Award for Best Actor on Television	Nominated	
2006	Nip/Tuck	Saturn Award for Best Actor on Television	Nominated	
2007	Nip/Tuck	Australian Film Institute International Award for Best Actor	Nominated	
2007	Fantastic Four: Rise of the Silver Surfer	Teen Choice Award for Choice Movie Villain	Nominated	
2007	Fantastic Four: Rise of the Silver Surfer	Teen Choice Award for Choice Movie Rumble (with Chris Evans)	Nominated	
2026	The Surfer	Australian Film Institute AACTA Award for Best Supporting Actor in Film	Won	
