= Kelly Carlson =

American actress & model (born 1976)

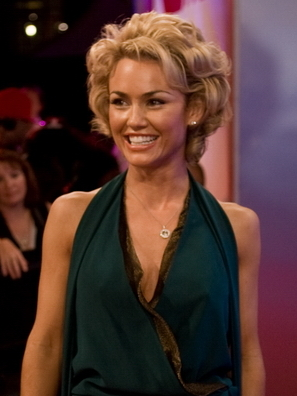
- Carlson at the eTalk Festive Party during the Toronto International Film Festival in September 2008
- Born: February 17, 1976 (age 50)
- Occupations: Actress, model
- Years active: 2001–2013, 2020
- Spouse: Dan Stanchfield (m. 2015)

Kelly Carlson (born February 17, 1976) is an American former actress and model and is a martial artist. She is best known for her role as Kimber Henry in the FX drama series Nip/Tuck.

== Career ==
Carlson was raised in Bloomington, Minnesota, and attended the Academy of Holy Angels in Richfield, Minnesota. In addition to her acting career, she has also modeled, including the advertisement campaigns for Miller Lite, Rembrandt, and Oliver Peoples sunglasses. She appeared in the August 2004 issue of Maxim Magazine and on the cover of the October 2004 issue of Stuff Magazine.

Carlson is the spokesperson for Smile Network International, a Minnesota-based humanitarian organization that provides reconstructive surgeries and related health care services to impoverished children and young adults in developing countries. An enthusiastic equestrian since age seven, Carlson lobbied a bill to prevent both inhumane transport of American horses to slaughterhouses in Mexico and Canada as well as roundups of wild horses by government authorities in January 2010.

Carlson started out in theater, performing in productions of Vanities, Cheaters, Girls Guide to Chaos, Charlotte's Web, and Can't Trust the Mate. In 2001, Carlson was listed on Tear Sheet PDX magazine's 50 Most Beautiful list and also appeared as an extra in the film 3000 Miles to Graceland. In 2003, she booked a guest role in the pilot episode of the FX drama series Nip/Tuck. Her character, Kimber Henry, quickly became popular with audiences, and she appeared in several episodes of the first and second seasons, eventually becoming a regular in the show's third season. She remained with the series until it wrapped up production in March 2010.

Outside of Nip/Tuck, she has appeared in several feature films, including Paparazzi (2004), The Marine (2006), the direct-to-video sequel Starship Troopers 2: Hero of the Federation (2004), and a supporting role in the comedy film Made of Honor (2008) alongside Patrick Dempsey and Michelle Monaghan. She has also made guest spots on Everwood, CSI: Crime Scene Investigation, CSI: Miami, Monk, and The Finder. She was also listed at #43 on Maxim magazine's Hot 100 of 2005 list, and ranked at #94 on their Hot 100 of 2007 list.

She was initially cast in the 2007 film Dead of Winter (later retitled Killer Movie) alongside Leighton Meester and Kaley Cuoco, but was replaced by former The Pussycat Dolls turned actress Cyia Batten before filming began, due to creative differences with the director. After completing work on the final episodes of Nip/Tuck in 2009, Carlson segued into a recurring role on The CW sequel of Melrose Place, playing a Hollywood madam. She also had a short appearance in the 2009 Canadian television film Degrassi Goes Hollywood. She was next seen in Ghostfacers, an online spin-off of The CW dark fantasy series Supernatural.

== Personal life ==
Carlson married Dan Stanchfield in 2015, who was then in the United States Navy; she retired from acting in 2013, when he received a permanent change of station to San Diego, but did return for one final role, in a faith-based direct-to-video film in 2020.

Carlson is trained in Kali. She is also a sponsor and volunteer for several organizations, including LongRun Thoroughbred Retirement Society and Wounded Warrior Project.

== Filmography ==
=== Film ===
Year	Title	Role	Notes
2001	3000 Miles to Graceland	Motorcycle Gang Member	
2004	Paparazzi	Kristin	
2006	The Marine	Kate Triton	
2007	Shadowbox	Sandy	Short film
2008	Made of Honor	Christie Bailey	
2008	Player 5150	Lucy	
2020	The Reason	Kaitlyn	Faith-based direct-to-video; final film role

=== Television ===
Year	Title	Role	Notes
2003–2010	Nip/Tuck	Kimber Henry	Recurring role (seasons 1–2); Main cast (seasons 3–6)
2004–2006	Everwood	Ada	3 episodes
2004	Starship Troopers 2: Hero of the Federation	Private Charlie Soda	TV movie
2005	Head Cases	Patty Knight	Episode: "Pilot"
2006	CSI: Crime Scene Investigation	Sally	Episode: "Bang-Bang"
2006	Break-In	Marla	TV movie
2007	CSI: Miami	Laurie Atherton	Episode: "Just Murdered"
2009	Degrassi Goes Hollywood	Herself	TV movie
2009	Monk	Lola	Episode: "Mr. Monk Is Someone Else"
2009–2010	Melrose Place	Wendi Mattison	4 episodes
2010	Castle	Ellie Monroe	Episode: "The Late Shaft"
2012	The Finder	FBI Agent Gail McHottie	Episode: "The Conversation"
2013	Jimmy	Ellen Mitchell	TV movie

=== Web ===
Year	Title	Role	Notes
2010	Ghostfacers	Janet Myers	6 episodes
