= Tonic discography =

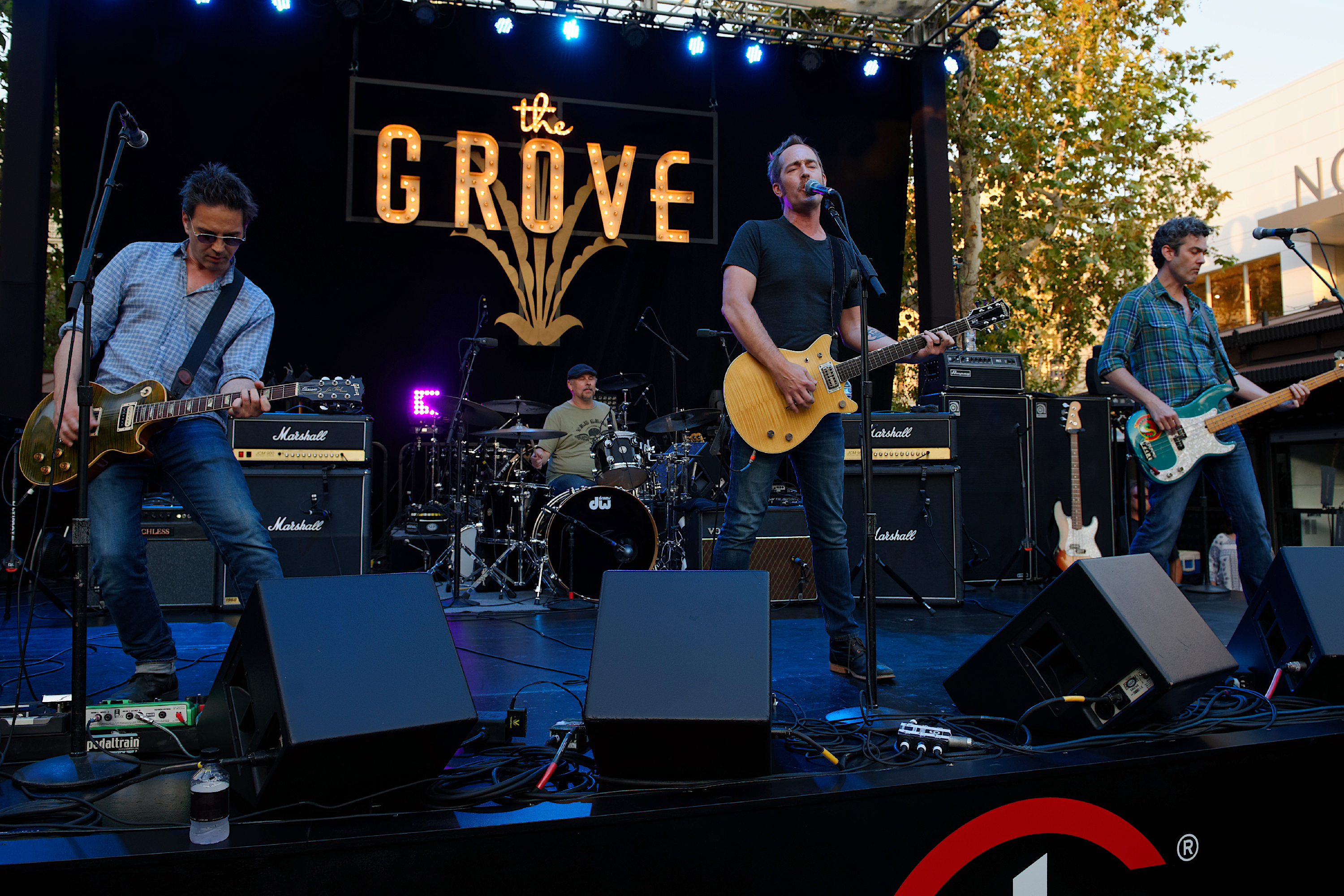
- Studio albums: 5
- Soundtrack albums: 5
- Live albums: 1
- Compilation albums: 1
- Singles: 13
- Music videos: 6

The discography of Tonic, an American rock band, consists of five studio albums, one live album, one compilation album, six singles, and six music videos. Tonic was formed in Los Angeles, California in 1993. After signing a recording contract in 1995, the band released its first album in 1996, titled Lemon Parade. Based on the success of the single "If You Could Only See", Lemon Parade sold 1,300,000 copies. Tonic also contributed songs to original soundtracks in the late 1990s, such as the song "Flower Man" for The X-Files: The Album. Continuing to tour extensively, the band released an album of live songs entitled Live and Enhanced, which also featured extra content, such as the music video for the song "Soldier's Daughter".

Tonic self-produced their second studio album Sugar in 1999, from which the song "You Wanted More" came to be the lead single from the American Pie movie soundtrack. Their third studio album, 2002's Head on Straight, charted on the Billboard 200 for one week, yet the band was nominated for two Grammy awards related to the album. After the band ended a four-year hiatus in 2008, the greatest hits compilation A Casual Affair: The Best of Tonic was released in 2009. The greatest hits compilation served as a prelude to their fourth studio album, 2010's Tonic. The band later utilized crowdfunding from fans to create an all-acoustic version of Lemon Parade titled Lemon Parade Revisited in 2016, before releasing their first-ever non-album single with 2021's track "To Be Loved".

== Albums ==
=== Studio albums ===
Title	Details	Peak chart positions				Sales	Certifications (sales thresholds)
Title	Details	US	US Ind.	AUS	CAN	Sales	Certifications (sales thresholds)
Lemon Parade	Released: July 16, 1996; Label: A&M	28	—	12	34	US: 1,328,821	RIAA: Platinum; ARIA: Platinum; MC: Platinum
Sugar	Released: November 9, 1999; Label: Universal	81	—	93	—	US: 274,587	
Head on Straight	Released: September 24, 2002; Label: Universal	141	—	—	—	US: 34,000	
Tonic	Released: May 4, 2010; Label: 429	150	25	—	—		
Lemon Parade Revisited	Released: July 22, 2016; Label: None (self-released)	—	30	—	—		

=== Live albums ===
Title	Details
Live and Enhanced	Released: March 1, 1999; Label: Unknown

=== Compilation albums ===
Title	Details
A Casual Affair: The Best of Tonic	Released: June 23, 2009; Label: Polydor

== Singles ==
Year	Single	Peak chart positions								Certification	Album
Year	Single	US	US Pop	US Adult	US Alt.	US Main.	AUS	CAN Rock/Alt.	NLD	Certification	Album
1996	"Open Up Your Eyes"	68^{[A]}	30	33	22	2	90	—	—		Lemon Parade
1997	"Casual Affair"	—	—	—	—	8	—	—	—		Lemon Parade
1997	"If You Could Only See"	11^{[A]}	11	7	3	1	20	1	100	ARIA: Gold	Lemon Parade
1997	"Soldier's Daughter"	—	—	—	—	—	—	—	—		Lemon Parade
1999	"You Wanted More"	103^{[B]}	—	26	10	3	58	6	—		Sugar
1999	"Knock Down Walls"	—	—	—	—	20	—	10	—		Sugar
2000	"Mean to Me"	—	—	—	—	—	—	—	—		Sugar
2000	"Sugar"	—	—	—	—	—	—	—	—		Sugar
2002	"Take Me as I Am"	—	—	36	—	—	—	—	—		Head on Straight
2002	"Head on Straight"	—	—	—	—	—	—	—	—		Head on Straight
2010	"Release Me"	—	—	34	—	—	—	—	—		Tonic
2021	"To Be Loved"	—	—	—	—	—	—	—	—		Non-album single
2021	"If You Could Only See (25th Anniversary)"	—	—	—	—	—	—	—	—		Non-album single

== Soundtrack and other songs ==
Year	Soundtrack	Track
1997	Scream 2 Soundtrack: Released: November 18, 1997; Label: Capitol Records	"Eyes of Sand"
1998	Legacy: A Tribute to Fleetwood Mac's Rumours: Released: March 17, 1998; Label: Lava/Atlantic	"Second Hand News"
1998	The X-Files: The Album: Released: June 2, 1998; Label: Elektra	"Flower Man"
1998	Clay Pigeons Original Soundtrack: Released: September 22, 1998; Label: Uptown/Universal	"Everybody's Talkin'"
1998	Live in the X Lounge: Released: 1998; Label: unknown	"Open Up Your Eyes" (Live)
1999	King of the Hill Original Television Soundtrack: Released: 1999; Label: Elektra Entertainment	"East Bound and Down"
1999	American Pie Original Soundtrack: Released: June 29, 1999; Label: Upton/Universal	"You Wanted More"
2001	Live in the X Lounge IV: Released: 2001; Label: Unknown	"Mean to Me" (Live)

=== Live cover songs ===
Tonic is known to have covered the songs "Jessie's Girl" (acoustic version), "Go Your Own Way", and "Suspicious Minds" at least once each in live settings. However, Tonic-played versions of these songs are not currently commercially available, with "Jessie's Girl" only known to exist as bootleg copies on file-sharing networks.

== Music videos ==
Year	Title	Director(s)
1996	"If You Could Only See"	Jeff Cutter and Ramaa Mosley
1996	"Open Up Your Eyes" (original version)	Thomas Mignone
1996	"Open Up Your Eyes" (roller skating version)	Tonic and Niels Alpert
1996	"Soldier's Daughter"	Kevin Godley
1999	"You Wanted More"	Niels Alpert
1999	"Mean to Me"	Niels Alpert

=== Other music videos ===
Year	Title	Director(s)	Notes
2000	"Mean to Me"	Unknown	Produced for the American feature film Gossip, this music video combined footage from Tonic's previous "Mean to Me" music video with clips from the "Gossip" film.
2021	"To Be Loved" (Lyric Video)	Sean Sorensen	Owing to a trend of music fans creating videos that display a song's lyrics while the song's audio plays, Tonic released their own official lyric video for their single "To Be Loved", complete with both additional and the same artwork as the cover for the digital single of this song. Credits listed on the video's official YouTube page listed credited Doug Nahory with the Artwork, & Video Design by: Inspired Films Studios - Sean Sorensen.

== Video game releases ==
Year	Game	Platforms	Track
2005	Karaoke Revolution Party: Released: November 8, 2005	PlayStation 2, Xbox, GameCube	"If You Could Only See"
2009	Band Hero and Guitar Hero 5: Released: November 3, 2009	PlayStation 2, PlayStation 3, Xbox 360, Nintendo Wii	"If You Could Only See"
2016	Rock Band 4: Released: August 16, 2016	PlayStation 4, Xbox One	"If You Could Only See"

== Notes ==
- A. "Open Up Your Eyes" and "If You Could Only See" peaked on the US Radio Songs chart.
- B. "You Wanted More" peaked outside of the US Billboard Hot 100 chart, therefore it is listed on the Bubbling Under Hot 100 chart.
