= Lynnie Greene =

American actress, writer, director, producer

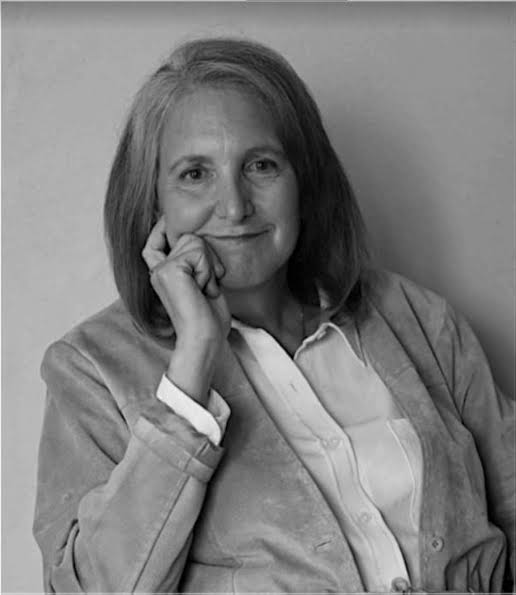
- Born: Newton, Massachusetts, U.S.
- Other name: Lyn Greene
- Education: Juilliard School; New York University (BA)
- Occupations: Actress, writer, television director and producer
- Known for: The Golden Girls; On Our Own

Lynnie Greene is an American actress, writer, director and producer in the television industry. In addition to her work as a producer, she is possibly best known as an actress for appearing as Young Dorothy in The Golden Girls.

== Early life ==
Greene was born and raised in Newton, Massachusetts. She went to Newton South High School where she was active in school plays.

She was selected for Juilliard’s Drama Department in 1972, as one of only 10 women picked to study under instructors John Houseman and Marian Seldes. She finished her B.A. from New York University in 1976.

== Career ==
=== Acting years: 1978-1993 ===
In 1977 she co-starred with another newcomer, Bess Armstrong, playing the character Maria Teresa Bonino in the short-lived CBS comedy On Our Own. She originated the role of Emma Goldman in the original off-Broadway production of Stephen Sondheim's Assassins in 1990–91, as well as recreating the role of Comrade Charlotte in the 1987 reworking of Kander & Ebb's Flora the Red Menace.

She played a recurring role in The Golden Girls during flashbacks, as a younger version of Bea Arthur's character, Dorothy Zbornak, appearing in four episodes overall.

=== Television writing: 1993-present ===
Greene was previously a writer and an executive producer on the series Nip/Tuck, Boss and the ABC series Scoundrels, which is a remake of the New Zealand television series Outrageous Fortune. She was also a co-executive producer on Showtime's Masters of Sex.

Greene and Richard Levine served creators and executive producers on the 2018 The Truth About the Harry Quebert Affair, based on Joël Dicker's 2014 novel. All of Greene's work was with frequent writing partner Levine.

Recently, Greene and Levine executive produced and served as writers for Hulu's upcoming Ryan Murphy legal drama series, All's Fair, starring Kim Kardashian and Glenn Close which premiered on November 4, 2025.

== Filmography ==
=== Acting credits ===
==== Film ====
- Over the Brooklyn Bridge (1984) – Cynthia Sherman (credited as Lynnie Greene)

==== Television ====
- On Our Own (1977–1978) – Maria Teresa Bonino (credited as Lynnie Greene)
- The Golden Girls (1987–1991) – Young Dorothy (4 episodes)
- Law & Order (1991) – Meg Hennessy (Episode: "The Torrents of Greed (1)")
- The Five Mrs. Buchanans (1994) – Mercedes Macomber (Episode: "Alex, Then and Now")
- Baby Boom (American TV series) (1988)
- Assassins (musical) (1991) (as Lyn Greene) (off-Broadway)

=== Writing, directing and producing credits ===
Year	Title	Creator	Writer	Director	Executive Producer
1994	California Dreams	No	Yes	No	No
1995	The 5 Mrs. Buchanans	No	Yes	No	No
1995-1996	The Crew	No	Yes	No	No
1996	Lush Life	No	Yes	No	No
1999	Family Rules	No	Yes	No	Producer
1999-2000	Stark Raving Mad	No	Yes	No	Producer
2000	Normal Ohio	No	Yes	No	Supervising
2002	First Monday	No	Yes	No	Producer
2002	JAG	No	Yes	No	No
2003-2010	Nip/Tuck	No	Yes	Yes	Yes
2010	Scoundrels	Developer	Yes	No	Yes
2011	Boss	No	Yes	No	Yes
2013	Masters of Sex	No	Yes	No	Supervising
2018	The Truth About the Harry Quebert Affair	Yes	Yes	No	Yes
2024-2025	Doctor Odyssey	No	No	No	Yes
2025–present	All's Fair	No	Yes	No	Yes

=== Other credits ===
- Get Rich Quick (1977) – Panelist
- The $10,000 Pyramid / The $20,000 Pyramid (1977) – Panelist

== Awards ==
- 1988 Drama Desk Nominee for Flora the Red Menace
- 2004 Golden Globe for Drama TV Series for Nip/Tuck

== Personal life ==
Greene lives in Santa Fe with her wife, Meg Fisher, who is an engineering executive for Apple Inc.
