= Sugar (Tonic album) =

Studio album by Tonic
- Released: November 9, 1999
- Studio: Sound City Studios and Andora Studios (Los Angeles, California); Sunset Sound Recorders (Hollywood, California); House of Blues Studios (Encino, California); Kingsway Studios (New Orleans, Louisiana)
- Genre: Post-grunge
- Length: 49:44
- Label: Universal
- Producer: Tonic; Mark Endert (track 2)

Tonic chronology
Lemon Parade (1996)	Sugar (1999)	Head on Straight (2002)

Professional ratings
Review scores
Source	Rating
AllMusic	3/5 stars
Entertainment Weekly	B
Rolling Stone	3/5 stars

Sugar is the second studio album by American band Tonic. Released on November 9, 1999, and produced by the band itself, the album's title shared the same name as the fifth track on the recording. The creative and collaborative process spanned several geographic locations including Austin, Texas, and a 15,000-square-foot (1,400 m^{2}) mansion in New Orleans, Louisiana, where actual recording for the album was performed. "Knock Down Walls" and "You Wanted More" were charting singles released off the record, with the latter having first appeared on the soundtrack to the movie American Pie. With Kevin Shepard no longer part of the band, touring drummer Peter Maloney (of Dishwalla) played drums on the album. Music videos for the songs "You Wanted More" and "Mean to Me" were created as part of the album's promotion. Tonic appeared on the television shows Late Night with Conan O'Brien and The Martin Short Show in late 1999 as part of additional promotion. Sugar spent eight total weeks on the Billboard 200 chart, reaching a peak of number 81 in its first week of release.

== Track listing ==
...there are no bad songs to be found anywhere on the entire album, each one bearing its own redeeming qualities, whether a driving beat or a tenacious scrap of melody...

— Music critic Mathias Sheaks reviews Sugar for All Music Guide

All songs by Emerson Hart except where noted.

1. "Future Says Run" – 3:46
2. "You Wanted More" (Hart, Jeff Russo, Dan Lavery) – 3:50
3. "Knock Down Walls" (Hart, Russo) – 3:43
4. "Mean to Me" – 4:11
5. "Sugar" (Hart, Lavery, Russo) – 3:29
6. "Jump Jimmy (Stronger Than Mine)" (Hart, Lavery) – 3:39
7. "Queen" – 4:34
8. "Waiting for the Light to Change" – 4:32
9. "Waltz with Me" – 3:45
10. "Sunflower" (Hart, Lavery) – 3:20
11. "Drag Me Down" (Hart, Lavery, Russo) – 2:46
12. "Top Falls Down" (Hart, Kevin Shepard, Russo) – 4:17
13. "Love a Diamond" (Hart, Lavery, Russo) – 3:52

== Personnel ==
Tonic

- Emerson Hart – lead vocals, backing vocals, acoustic rhythm guitar, electric rhythm guitar, slide guitar
- Jeff Russo – Mellotron strings, acoustic lead guitar, electric lead guitar, acoustic rhythm guitar, electric rhythm guitar, slide guitar, backing vocals
- Dan Lavery – Rhodes electric piano, Moog bass pedals, bass guitar, backing vocals

Additional musicians

- John Ewing – programming
- Pete Maloney – drums (1, 3–13)
- Joey Waronker – drums (2)
- Lenny Castro – percussion
- David Campbell – string arrangements (8)
- Joel Derouin – string conductor (8)
- Larry Corbett – cello (8)
- Suzie Katayama – cello (8)
- Matt Funes – viola (8)
- David Sternke – viola (8)
- Eve Butler – violin (8)
- Gerardo Hilera – violin (8)
- Peter Kent – violin (8)
- Michele Richards – violin (8)

Production

- Nick Gatfield – executive producer
- Tonic – producers
- Mark Endert – producer (2), engineer (2)
- Jeff Powell – engineer (1, 3–13)
- John Ewing – additional engineer (1, 3–13)
- David Bryant – assistant engineer (1, 3–13)
- Rich Eldridge – assistant engineer (1, 3–13)
- Mike Terry – assistant engineer (1, 3–13)
- Doug Boehm – assistant engineer (2)
- Andy Wallace – mixing at Soundtrack Studios (New York, NY)
- Steve Sisco – mix assistant
- Greg Calbi – mastering at Sterling Sound (New York, NY)
- Jack Knobber – live sound engineer
- Jocelyn Cooper – A&R
- Greg Hammer – A&R
- Valerie Peck – production coordinator
- Jeri Heiden – art direction, design
- Elvis Swft – illustrations, lettering
- Marvin J. Heade – illustration ("Magnolias on a Blue Velvet Cloth")
- Malcolm Tarlofsky – artwork ("Bicycle Man")
- Danny Clinch – photography
- Gene Pierce – photography
- Sheila Scott – management

== Charts ==
Chart performance for Sugar
Chart (1999)	Peak position
Australian Albums (ARIA)	93
US Billboard 200	81
