= The Truth About the Harry Quebert Affair (miniseries) =

2018 American television miniseries

- Promotional poster
- Genre: Mystery; Drama
- Created by: Lyn Greene; Richard Levine
- Based on: The Truth About the Harry Quebert Affair by Joël Dicker
- Directed by: Jean-Jacques Annaud
- Starring: Patrick Dempsey; Kristine Froseth; Ben Schnetzer; Damon Wayans Jr.; Virginia Madsen
- Composer: Simon Franglen
- Country of origin: United States
- Original language: English
- No. of seasons: 1
- No. of episodes: 10

Production
- Executive producers: Jean-Jacques Annaud; Tarak Ben Ammar; Fabio Conversi; Lyn Greene; Richard Levine
- Camera setup: Single-camera
- Running time: 43–50 minutes
- Production companies: MGM Television; Eagle Pictures; Barbary Films; Repērage; Muse Entertainment; Old Friends Productions

Original release
- Network: Epix
- Release: September 4 – October 17, 2018

The Truth About the Harry Quebert Affair is an American mystery drama television miniseries created by Lyn Greene and Richard Levine, based on the 2014 novel by Joël Dicker, that premiered on Epix. The series was directed by Jean-Jacques Annaud and stars Patrick Dempsey, Kristine Froseth, Ben Schnetzer, Damon Wayans Jr., and Virginia Madsen.

The miniseries aired on Epix from September 4 to October 17, 2018, consisting of 10 episodes. Prior to its debut in the United States, the series was sold and premiered in international markets.

== Premise ==
The Truth About the Harry Quebert Affair follows "a young writer who heads to Harry Quebert's home for some inspiration. Instead, he finds that Harry's been accused of murdering 15-year-old Nola Kellergan, who went missing years prior."

== Cast and characters ==
- Patrick Dempsey as Harry Quebert
- Ben Schnetzer as Marcus Goldman
- Damon Wayans Jr. as Sgt. Perry Gahalowood
- Kristine Froseth as Nola Kellergan
  - Ryan Kiera Armstrong as young Nola Kellergan
- Kurt Fuller as Chief Gareth Pratt
- Victoria Clark as Jenny Quinn
  - Tessa Mossey as young Jenny Quinn
- Wayne Knight as Benjamin Roth
- Don Harvey as Bobbo Quinn
- Matt Frewer as Reverend Kellergan
- Colm Feore as Elijah Stern
- Josh Close as Luther Caleb
- Craig Eldridge as Travis Dawn
  - Connor Price as young Travis Dawn
- Virginia Madsen as Tamara Quinn
- Felicia Shulman as Maggie Pratt
- Domenic Di Rosa as Raul
- Ron Perlman as Roy
- Vlasta Vrána as Ernie Pinkas

== Episodes ==
| No. | Title | Directed by | Written by | Original release date |
|---|---|---|---|---|
| 1 | "How Does Your Garden Grow?" | Jean-Jacques Annaud | Lyn Greene & Richard Levine | September 4, 2018 |
| 2 | "The Boxing Match" | Jean-Jacques Annaud | Lyn Greene & Richard Levine and Hanna Weg | September 11, 2018 |
| 3 | "The Fourth of July" | Jean-Jacques Annaud | Lyn Greene & Richard Levine | September 18, 2018 |
| 4 | "Family Matters" | Jean-Jacques Annaud | Lyn Greene & Richard Levine | September 25, 2018 |
| 5 | "Mirror, Mirror" | Jean-Jacques Annaud | Lyn Greene & Richard Levine | October 2, 2018 |
| 6 | "No Angel" | Jean-Jacques Annaud | Lyn Greene & Richard Levine | October 13, 2018 |
| 7 | "Persona Non Grata" | Jean-Jacques Annaud | Michael Horowitz | October 17, 2018 |
| 8 | "Got It All Wrong" | Jean-Jacques Annaud | Lisa Melamed | October 17, 2018 |
| 9 | "Firebug" | Jean-Jacques Annaud | Lyn Greene & Richard Levine | October 17, 2018 |
| 10 | "The End" | Jean-Jacques Annaud | Lyn Greene & Richard Levine | October 17, 2018 |

== Production ==
=== Development ===
On August 15, 2017, it was announced that Epix had given the production a series order consisting of ten episodes. The series will be entirely directed by Jean-Jacques Annaud. The pilot episode was written by Lyn Greene and Richard Levine who also wrote additional episodes as well. Executive producers include Annaud, Greene, Levine, Tarak Ben Ammar, and Fabio Conversi. Production companies involved with the series include MGM Television, Eagle Pictures, and Barbary Films.

=== Casting ===
Alongside the initial series order announcement, it was confirmed that Patrick Dempsey, Ben Schnetzer, Damon Wayans Jr., Virginia Madsen, Kristine Froseth, Colm Feore, Josh Close, Matt Frewer, Craig Eldridge, Connor Price, Victoria Clark, Tessa Mossey, Kurt Fuller, Don Harvey, Felicia Shulman, and Wayne Knight had been cast in the series.

=== Filming ===
Principal photography for the series began in the fall of 2017 in Montreal, Canada.

== Release ==
=== Premiere ===
On April 6, 2018, a "sneak peek" 35-minute presentation of select scenes from the series were debuted at international television festival Canneseries in Cannes, France. Those cast and crew members in attendance included Jean-Jacques Annaud, Patrick Dempsey, Ben Schnetzer, and Kristine Froseth.

=== Distribution ===
The Truth About the Harry Quebert Affair premiered on September 4, 2018, in the United States on Epix and in the United Kingdom on Sky Witness. In Australia, the series premiered on Stan on September 28, 2018. In Denmark, the series premiered on C More on November 1, 2018. In Switzerland, the series premiered on the French-speaking channel RTS Un on November 20, 2018. In France, the series premiered on TF1 on November 21, 2018. In New Zealand, the series was released on Lightbox on December 18, 2018. In Italy, the series premiered on Sky Atlantic on March 20, 2019. In Canada, the series premiered on CTV Drama Channel on September 15, 2019.
