= Tonic (Tonic album) =

Studio album by Tonic
- Released: May 4, 2010
- Recorded: 2009–2010
- Studio: Conway Studios (Hollywood, California); La Villa Maria, The Tree House and Studio Without Walls (Los Angeles, California); Aimeeland Studio (Brentwood, Tennessee)
- Genre: Rock
- Length: 42:24
- Label: 429
- Producer: Tonic; Nathaniel Kunkel

Tonic chronology
Head on Straight (2002)	Tonic (2010)	Lemon Parade Revisited (2016)

Singles from Tonic
- 1. "Release Me" Released: March 23, 2010

Tonic is the self-titled fourth studio album by American rock band Tonic. The project was originally announced in 2008, with writing and recording carrying through summer and fall of 2009. Recorded primarily at Conway Studios in Hollywood, California, the album was co-produced by Tonic and Nathaniel Kunkel. Critical reception to Tonic was generally positive. The album was released on May 4, 2010 in North America, and spent one week on the Billboard 200 album chart, where it ranked 150. The band subsequently embarked on a tour to coincide with this album's release.

== Production ==
Band member Jeff Russo originally announced plans to record this album in November 2008 when he concurrently announced Tonic was reuniting after nearly four years. The three band members began writing material for the album during the summer of 2009, with the majority of this work being done at Emerson Hart's home in Nashville, Tennessee. The album was recorded over the span of a month during fall 2009 at Conway Studios in Hollywood, jointly produced by Tonic and Nathaniel Kunkel. Pete Maloney continued his longtime association with the band by playing drums on the album, though Hart, Russo, and Lavery remained the only official members of Tonic during this period.

This was a true collaborative effort from all of us and it really, really is apparent in the record. In my opinion it may be the best record we’ve ever made, just in every way you can think about.

— Jeff Russo comments on the Tonic album

Mixing and post-production carried on into 2010, and the band worked with Doug Sax to master the recording. The vocal track for to "Torn to Pieces" was recorded in Nashville. The track "Release Me" was the first single released from the album, becoming available to radio stations on March 23, 2010. The album itself was released as scheduled on May 4, 2010 in North America. Hart was inspired to write the song "Precious Little Bird" after he was unpacking some music albums by The Smiths. The song was then utilized for the album's cover art.

During an interview relating to the album, Hart said, "At the end of the day we've always relied on the cream rising to the top and creating a great product and great songs and being honest about where we are." An official press release about the album states that it is redolent of Tonic's, "trademark honest, powerful, melodic rock sound." Russo said of the album that, "This was a true collaborative effort from all of us and it really, really is apparent in the record. In my opinion it may be the best record we’ve ever made, just in every way you can think about." A behind the scenes tour of Conway Studios hosted by Emerson Hart is available on Amazon.com's Tonic store, and is thought to have marked the world debut of snippets of "Release Me," as well as part of the album's cover art.

== Promotion and release ==
At the end of the day we've always relied on the cream rising to the top and creating a great product and great songs and being honest about where we are.

— Emerson Hart comments during an interview about the Tonic album

Tonic planned to tour during summer 2010 to help promote the album, with Hart saying of the band that, "We'll probably go back to slugging in clubs and small theaters and stuff like that." The tour plans were fully realized, as the band played intermittent shows stretching into fall and winter of 2010. Radio is playing a role in the album's promotion, as the single "Release Me" is being promoted at Hot AC, Alternative and Triple-A radio. Tonic is also utilizing technology that didn't exist during its 2002 release of Head on Straight, namely using Twitter, Facebook, and MySpace as ways to connect with fans and subsequently promote the album. Additional promotional avenues, such as a music video for "Release Me" or digital video game track release (via the Rock Band Network for instance) have not (yet) been utilized.

The album became available for pre-order in late February 2010, with varying retail prices. However, prior to the album's release Russo said he thought the album's success should be judged by how many people attend Tonic's live shows. Varying websites offered preview clips of the album's songs, and Tonic used a special promotion where users could also download the entire song "Daffodil" by submitting a valid e-mail address. The album's online sales ranking through web retailers Amazon.com and iTunes have to date reached their peak on the May 4 release day, reaching #135 and #28 respectively. Tonic debuted on the Billboard 200 at #150 during the week of May 22, 2010, while also appearing at #50 on the Billboard Rock album chart, and #25 on the Billboard Independent Albums chart. The album did not chart on either one of those listings after its debut week though.

== Reception ==
Thankfully, Tonic doesn't sound like the work of a band struggling to re-create their past success, and instead finds them confidently embracing their signature sound and doing what they do with a sure hand and genuine inspiration.

— Music critic Mark Demming reviews Tonic

Initial critical reception to the album was positive. Allmusic critic Mark Demming rated the album three out of five stars, saying, "Thankfully, Tonic doesn't sound like the work of a band struggling to re-create their past success, and instead finds them confidently embracing their signature sound and doing what they do with a sure hand and genuine inspiration...Tonic is less a comeback than an enthusiastic return to form, and anyone who enjoyed their first three albums will feel comfortably at home with this music." Music reviewer Chad from music website Alternative Addiction rated the album four and half out of five stars, saying, "The contrasting melodies of tracks like “Daffodil” and “Feel It Now” show that the band hasn’t lost their knack for writing melodic rock tracks either."

== Track listing ==
All songs written by Tonic.

1. Release Me - 3:17
2. Daffodil - 3:25
3. I Want It To Be - 3:43
4. Send A Message - 3:28
5. Bigger Than Both - 4:10
6. Nothing Is Everything - 4:27
7. Feel It Now - 3:03
8. Where Do I Fit - 3:09
9. Resolve - 4:21
10. Precious Little Bird - 2:51
11. Torn To Pieces - 2:44
12. She Goes Down - 3:46
13. Daffodil [Acoustic] (iTunes Bonus Track) - 3:25

== Chart positions ==
=== Album ===
Year	Title	Peak chart positions						Sales	Certifications (sales thresholds)
Year	Title	US	US Rock	US Indep.	CAN	NZ	UK	Sales	Certifications (sales thresholds)
2010	Tonic: Released: May 4, 2010; Label: 429 Records	150	50	25	—	—	—	unknown	—

==== Online sales rankings ====
Retail outlet	Peak sales ranking date	Peak sales ranking
Amazon.com	May 4, 2010	#135 in music section
iTunes	May 4, 2010	#28 on Top Albums chart

=== Singles ===
Year	Single	Peak chart positions						
Year	Single	US Pop	US Adult Pop	US Alternative	AUS	CAN Rock/Alt	NZ	UK
2010	"Release Me"	—	34	—	—	—	—	—

== Personnel ==
Tonic

- Emerson Hart – lead vocals, keyboards, acoustic and electric rhythm guitars
- Jeff Russo – keyboards, acoustic piano, acoustic lead and rhythm guitars, electric lead and rhythm guitars, lap steel guitar, percussion, backing and harmony vocals
- Dan Lavery – acoustic piano, acoustic guitar, bass, backing and harmony vocals

Additional personnel

- Chris Joyner – acoustic piano (6)
- Pete Maloney – drums

Production

- Jared Levine – A&R
- Tonic – producers
- Nathaniel Kunkel – producer, engineer, mixing
- Brian Whitman – assistant engineer, mix assistant
- Doug Sax – mastering at The Mastering Lab (Ojai, California)
- Rod Blackhurst – photography
- David Alan Kogut – art direction
- Northeast Venture Group Inc. – art direction
- Sanctuary Artist Management – management
