= You Wanted More =

1999 single by Tonic

Single by Tonic

from the album Sugar and American Pie: Music from the Motion Picture
- Released: June 7, 1999
- Length: 3:50
- Label: Universal
- Songwriters: Emerson Hart; Jeff Russo; Dan Lavery
- Producer: Tonic

Tonic singles chronology
"If You Could Only See" (1997)	"You Wanted More" (1999)	"Knock Down Walls" (1999)

Music video
- "You Wanted More" on YouTube

"You Wanted More" is a song by Los Angeles band Tonic that originally appeared in the 1999 film American Pie. It was released on June 7, 1999, and was also featured on Tonic's second album, Sugar, released later in the year. The single peaked at number three on the US Billboard Bubbling Under Hot 100 chart and reached the same position on the Billboard Mainstream Rock Tracks chart, as well as on the Canadian RPM Rock Report.

== Lyrics ==
The lyrics include many lines beginning with "Love is": "Love is tragic", "love is strong", "love is surely better when it's gone", etc. The chorus expresses that the singer's love interest was too demanding: "'Cause you wanted more/More than I could give/More than I could handle/In a life that I can't live".

== Critical reception ==
All-Reviews.com commented on the contrast between instrumentation and lyrics: "The music has tough rock guitar chords but the lyrics are a sappy account of what love is", and opined that Tonic's "desire to be all things to all people is illustrated by the song's opening".

== Chart performance ==
The single peaked at number three on the US Billboard Bubbling Under Hot 100, leading some to brand Tonic a one-hit wonder, with "If You Could Only See" being the band's only song to gain extended success. Despite this, the song is well known in the United States due to its use in American Pie. "You Wanted More" also peaked at number three on Billboard's Mainstream Rock Tracks chart and number 10 on Billboard's Modern Rock Tracks chart. Its airplay peak was in October 1999, as it was the sixth-most played song on alternative, pop and rock radio stations across the United States.

In Canada, "You Wanted More" peaked at number three on the RPM Rock Report and was the 16th most successful rock hit of 1999. The song also experienced moderate success in Australia, where it peaked at number 58 alongside another Tonic song, "Sugar".

== Music video ==
The music video, directed by Niels Alpert, is set at a high school. Emerson Hart is shown both as a janitor in the hallway and playing with his band in the gymnasium. Scenes with cheerleaders wearing uniforms with the word LOVE in the gym are interspersed throughout the video. The principal's office and biology class are also shown, while students walk out of the building and make out on the quad at the end of the video.

== Track listings ==
European CD single

No.	Title	Length
1.	"You Wanted More" (LP version)	3:51
2.	"If You Could Only See" (acoustic version)	4:17
3.	"Open Up Your Eyes" (live)	3:40
4.	"You Wanted More" (video)	4:04

German maxi-CD single

No.	Title	Length
1.	"You Wanted More"	3:50
2.	"Sugar"	3:25
3.	"Mean to Me"	4:12

Japanese CD single

No.	Title	Length
1.	"You Wanted More"
2.	"You Wanted More" (Organic mix)
3.	"Drag Me Down"

== Charts ==
=== Weekly charts ===
Chart (1999)	Peak position
Australia (ARIA) with "Sugar"	58
Canada Rock/Alternative (RPM)	3
US Bubbling Under Hot 100 (Billboard)	3
US Adult Alternative Airplay (Billboard)	17
US Alternative Airplay (Billboard)	10
US Adult Pop Airplay (Billboard)	26
US Mainstream Rock (Billboard)	3

=== Year-end charts ===
Chart (1999)	Position
Canada Rock/Alternative (RPM)	16
US Adult Top 40 (Billboard)	98
US Mainstream Rock Tracks (Billboard)	27
US Modern Rock Tracks (Billboard)	45

== Release history ==
Region	Date	Format(s)	Label(s)	Ref(s).
United States	June 7, 1999	Active rock; alternative radio	Universal	
United States	August 2, 1999	Adult contemporary; hot adult contemporary; modern adult contemporary radio	Universal	
United States	August 3, 1999	Contemporary hit radio	Universal	
Japan	February 16, 2000	CD	Universal Music Japan	
