= Head on Straight =

Studio album by Tonic
- Released: September 24, 2002
- Studio: Henson Recording Studios (Hollywood, California); Plantation Mixing and Recording (Maui, Hawaii)
- Genre: Post-grunge
- Length: 48:27
- Label: Universal Records
- Producer: Bob Rock

Tonic chronology
Sugar (1999)	Head on Straight (2002)	Tonic (2010)

Head on Straight is Tonic's third album, released in 2002. It was nominated for Best Rock Album at the 45th Grammy Awards and the track "Take Me As I Am" was nominated for Best Rock Performance by a Duo or Group with Vocal. The album had sold 34,000 copies as of February 2003.

== Reception ==
Professional ratings
Review scores
Source	Rating
Allmusic	3/5 stars
Rolling Stone	3/5 stars

The album received a moderate to good critical reception, with music review site Alternative Addiction giving the album four of five stars, saying, "Tonic's amazing musicianship and incredible lyrics still shine through strong showing that Tonic is one of the few bands left in the industry that have their head on straight."

The title track was also included on the album "Chelsea Mix" which was released to promote the My Scene dolls.

== Track listing ==
All songs written by Emerson Hart, except where noted.

1. "Roses" − 3:27
2. "Take Me As I Am" (Hart, Dan Lavery) - 3:36
3. "Count On Me (Somebody)" (Hart, Lavery) − 3:48
4. "Do You Know" (Hart, Lavery) − 3:47
5. "Head on Straight" (Hart, Lavery, Jeff Russo) − 3:45
6. "Liar" (Hart, Russo) − 2:54
7. "On Your Feet Again" − 3:53
8. "Come Rest Your Head" (Hart, Russo) − 4:27
9. "Ring Around Her Finger" − 4:21
10. "Believe Me" (Hart, Lavery, Russo) − 3:28
11. "Irish" (Hart, Lavery, Russo, Kevin Shepard) − 5:07
12. "Let Me Go" − 5:54

== Personnel ==
Tonic

- Emerson Hart – lead vocals, backing vocals, acoustic piano, acoustic rhythm guitar, electric rhythm guitar
- Jeff Russo – Rhodes electric piano, string machine, acoustic lead guitar, electric lead guitar, acoustic rhythm guitar, electric rhythm guitar, slide guitar, backing vocals
- Dan Lavery – acoustic piano, basses, backing vocals

Additional musicians

- Will Hollis – additional keyboards
- Joey Waronker – drums
- Lenny Castro – percussion

Acoustic guitar army

- Tonic
- Silver River Rustlers

=== Production ===
- Tom Mackay – A&R
- Corey Roberts – A&R
- Bob Rock – producer, arrangements, recording
- Tonic – arrangements
- Mike Gillies – digital engineer, digital editing
- Mick Rock – runner, acoustic guitar army recording
- Eric Helmkamp – second engineer
- Alex Gibson – assistant engineer
- Brian Humphrey – assistant engineer
- Kevin Mills – assistant engineer
- Randy Staub – mixing
- German Villacorta – mix assistant
- George Marino – mastering at Sterling Sound (New York, NY)
- Jeri Heiden – art direction, design
- Neal Preston – photography
- Azoffmusic Management – management
