= Jeff Russo =

American songwriter and composer

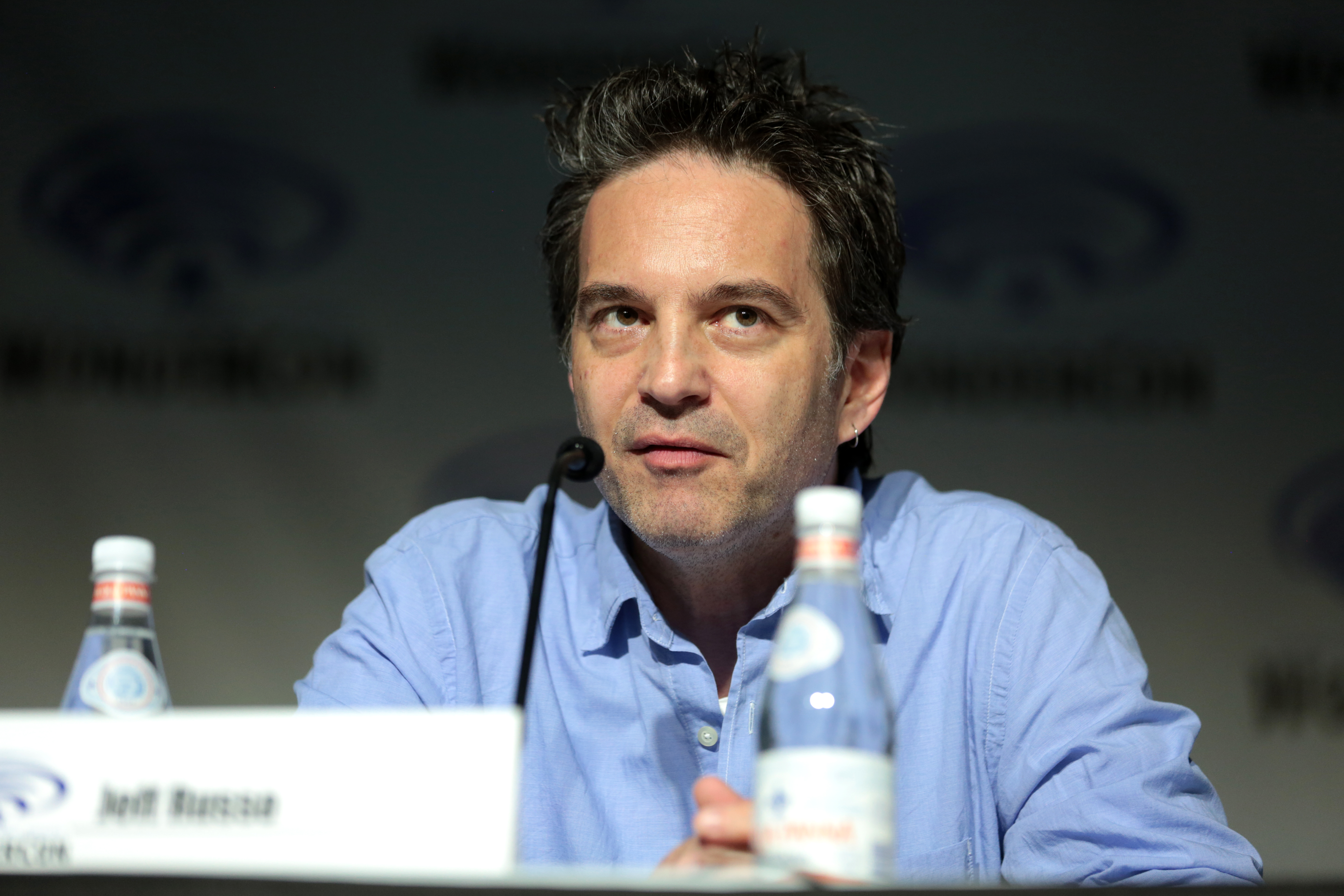
- Russo in 2018

Background information
- Origin: United States
- Genres: Rock, americana
- Occupations: Composer, songwriter, guitarist, vocalist, music producer
- Years active: 1993–present
- Website: jeffrusso.com

Jeff Russo (born August 31, 1969) is an American composer, songwriter, guitarist, vocalist and music producer, and one of the two founding members of the rock band Tonic. He is also a founding member of the Americana band Low Stars.

Russo is also known for his work as a composer on various films and television series, notably the Noah Hawley series Fargo, Legion and Alien: Earth (as well as his film Lucy in the Sky); the Star Trek series Star Trek: Discovery, Star Trek: Picard, Star Trek: Strange New Worlds, and Star Trek: Starfleet Academy; the American remake of Utopia; as well as Counterpart, Snowfall, and For All Mankind. He also scored the miniseries The Night Of, Brand New Cherry Flavor, and Ripley, and the acclaimed video game What Remains of Edith Finch. For his work on Fargo, he won the Primetime Emmy Award for Outstanding Music Composition for a Limited Series, Movie, or Special in 2017.

== Biography ==
Russo began his music career as a rock musician, co-founding the band Tonic. In 2006 he was invited (by his friends, Wendy & Lisa) to assist in the studio while they worked on multiple film and TV projects, and he realized how much he enjoyed the process. He scores two Peabody Award nominated shows: CBS’s Star Trek: Discovery and FX’s Legion, starring Dan Stevens and Aubrey Plaza. He also scores on Netflix’s The Umbrella Academy starring Elliot Page, Robert Sheehan and Mary J. Blige, which is based on the popular comic book series by Gerard Way and Gabriel Ba. He wrote for Noah Hawley’s feature directorial debut from Fox Searchlight, Lucy in the Sky, starring Natalie Portman and Jon Hamm, and Altered Carbon, an adaptation of Richard K. Morgan’s sci-fi novel. His film work includes scoring Mark Wahlberg’s action-thriller film Mile 22, Craig Macneill’s Lizzie, starring Chloë Sevigny and Kristen Stewart, which premiered at the 2018 Sundance Film Festival, and Jon Avnet’s Three Christs, starring Richard Gere, which premiered at the 2017 Toronto International Film Festival. His first connection with the Star Trek franchise was his contribution to Star Trek: Discovery.

Russo and his wife, musician Nina Gordon of Veruca Salt, have two children.

== Albums ==
Russo performing in 1995

=== Tonic ===
Year	Album
1996	Lemon Parade
1999	Live and Enhanced
1999	Sugar
2002	Head on Straight
2009	A Casual Affair: The Best of Tonic
2010	Tonic
2016	Lemon Parade Revisited

=== Guest appearance ===
Year	Album
2016	TAMA GIRARD "When I Think of You" (Single)

=== Low Stars ===
Year	Album
2007	Calling All Friends EP
2007	Low Stars

=== Solo ===
Year	Album
2007-2008	Make Me Feel Good About Me (unreleased)

=== Soundtracks ===
==== Film ====
Year	Title	Director(s)	Notes
2004	Ghost Game	Joe Knee	
2010	Lesson Plan	Philip Neel; David H. Jeffery	
2012	About Cherry	Stephen Elliott	
2012	Watercolor Postcards	Rajeev Dassani	
2013	Free Ride	Shana Betz	
2013	Bad Behaviour	Nicholas Brandt; Lisa Hamil	
2014	The Surface	Gil Cates Jr.	
2017	Hondros	Greg Campbell	Documentary film
2017	Three Christs	Jon Avnet	
2017	Submission	Richard Levine	
2018	Lizzie	Craig William Macneill	
2018	Mile 22	Peter Berg	
2019	Lucy in the Sky	Noah Hawley	
2020	Lorelei	Sabrina Doyle	
2022	American Dreamer	Paul Dektor	
2023	What You Wish For	Nicholas Tomnay	Co-composed with Tracie Turnbull
2023	Canary	Danny O'Malley; Alex Rivest	Documentary film Co-composed with Paul Doucette
2024	Rob Peace	Chiwetel Ejiofor	
2025	The Last Rodeo	Jon Avnet	
2025	Looking Through Water	Roberto Sneider	

==== Television ====
Year	Series	Notes
2009	The Unusuals	
2010	My Generation	
2011-2013	Necessary Roughness	Scored 16 episodes
2013-2014	Hostages	Composed with Ben Decter
2014–present	Fargo	Primetime Emmy Award for Outstanding Music Composition for a Limited Series, Movie, or Special for "Aporia"; Nominated — Primetime Emmy Award for Outstanding Music Composition for a Limited Series, Movie, or Special for "Loplop"; Nominated — Primetime Emmy Award for Outstanding Music Composition for a Limited Series, Movie, or Special for "The Crocodile's Dilemma"
2014–2020	Power	
2015	Tut	Miniseries
2015	Manhattan	
2015	The Returned	With Zoë Keating
2016	American Gothic	
2016	The Night Of	Miniseries
2016–2021	Lucifer	Composed with Ben Decter; Replaced Marco Beltrami and Dennis Smith for Season 2 onwards
2016-2018	Channel Zero	
2017-2018	Ghosted	
2017-2019	Legion	
2017-2019	Counterpart	
2017–2023	Snowfall	
2017–2024	Star Trek: Discovery	Original Star Trek Theme by Alexander Courage
2018–2020	Altered Carbon	
2018–2020	Star Trek: Short Treks	Original Star Trek Theme by Alexander Courage; Composed the main theme, the score for the first season and the music for "Children of Mars" from the second season. The rest of the second season continued to use Russo's title theme. Still, the scores were otherwise composed by various composers, including Kris Bowers, Nami Melumad and others, with Michael Giacchino serving as supervising composer and writing the music for the short he directed.
2018	Waco	Miniseries. Co-composed with Jordan Gagne
2018	Santa Clarita Diet	Composed the 2nd and 3rd seasons. 1st season composed by John Debney
2019–2024	The Umbrella Academy	
2019–present	For All Mankind	
2019	The Act	
2019	The InBetween	
2019	Treadstone	Original Bourne themes by John Powell. Co-composed with Jordan Gagne
2020–2023	Star Trek: Picard	Composed the first two seasons. Arranged and conducted the title card music and served as supervisory composer for the third and final one, with the score being composed by Stephen Barton and Frederik Wiedmann
2020	Warrior Nun	
2020	Cursed	Composed theme
2020	Brave New World	Co-composed with Jordan Gagne
2020	Utopia	
2020–2024	Power Book II: Ghost	
2021	Clarice	
2021	Oslo	Television film. Co-composed with Zoë Keating
2021	Brand New Cherry Flavor	Miniseries
2022	Star Trek: Strange New Worlds	Composed the main theme
2022–2025	Bosch: Legacy	
2023	Love & Death	Miniseries
2023	Mrs. Davis	Miniseries
2023	High Desert	
2024	Ripley	Miniseries
2025	Star Trek: Section 31	Television film
2025	Zero Day	Miniseries
2025	Alien: Earth	
2025	Ballard	
2025	Untamed	
2025	The Twisted Tale of Amanda Knox	Miniseries
2025	Hostage	Miniseries
2026	Star Trek: Starfleet Academy	

==== Video games ====
Year	Title	Studio	Notes
2017	What Remains of Edith Finch	Giant Sparrow	Nominated — BAFTA Game Award for Best Music
2018	Madden NFL 18	Electronic Arts	Story mode Longshot
