= A Casual Affair: The Best of Tonic =

Compilation album by Tonic
- Released: June 23, 2009
- Genre: Alternative rock, post-grunge
- Length: 63:48
- Label: Polydor

A Casual Affair: The Best of Tonic is a compilation album of the band Tonic, released in 2009. The album was released in conjunction with the band reuniting for a national tour from late 2008 to late fall of 2009. The album features twelve songs from their first three albums, plus three bonus tracks: live versions of the songs "Irish" and "Sugar" in addition to an acoustic version of "You Wanted More."

== Track listing ==
1. "You Wanted More" (3:53)
2. "Take Me as I Am" (3:38)
3. "If You Could Only See" (4:24)
4. "Knock Down Walls" (3:46)
5. "Count on Me (Somebody)" (3:49)
6. "Sugar" (3:31)
7. "Soldier's Daughter" (5:04)
8. "Lemon Parade" (3:42)
9. "Mean to Me" (4:13)
10. "Open Up Your Eyes" (3:43)
11. "Casual Affair" (3:35)
12. "Irish" (5:07)
13. "You Wanted More" (acoustic) (3:52)
14. "Sugar" (live) (4:04)
15. "Irish" (live) (7:19)
16. "Open Up Your Eyes" (live) (3:40) (iTunes Bonus Track)
17. "Lemon Parade" (live) (3:44) (iTunes Bonus Track)
18. "Casual Affair" (live) (3:47) (iTunes Bonus Track)
19. "If You Could Only See" (acoustic) (iTunes Bonus Track)
20. "Soldier's Daughter" (Radio Edit) (iTunes Bonus Track)
21. "If You Could Only See" (Two Meter Sessions) (iTunes Bonus Track)
