= The Truth About the Harry Quebert Affair =

2014 novel by Joël Dicker

- First edition
- Author: Joël Dicker
- Original title: La Vérité sur l'affaire Harry Quebert
- Language: French
- Publisher: Éditions de Fallois / L’Âge d’Homme
- Publication date: 19 September 2012
- Publication place: Switzerland
- English publication date: 27 May 2014
- Media type: Print (paperback)
- Pages: 670
- ISBN: 978-2877068161
- Followed by: The Baltimore Boys

The Truth About the Harry Quebert Affair is a novel by Swiss author Joël Dicker. It was published in the United States on 27 May 2014, by Penguin Books. The original French version, La Vérité sur l’affaire Harry Quebert, has sold more than one million copies. Rights have been bought for translations into 32 languages. Including the translations, La Vérité sur l’affaire Harry Quebert has sold more than three million copies.

== Plot ==
The novel is set in a coastal New Hampshire town (called Aurora in the original version and Somerset in the English translation). The protagonist, Marcus Goldman, is a successful young novelist who needs inspiration for his next book. Marcus heads to New Hampshire to stay with his college professor, Harry Quebert, to focus on his writing. When the body of Nola Kellergan is found 33 years after she went missing and Quebert is accused of her murder, Marcus works to uncover the truth. The result of his investigation becomes his next book.

== Reception and honours ==
The book was very popular in Europe, but had middling reviews in North America, due to its use of cliches and its unflattering depiction of American culture.

The book has been described as a "breathtakingly plotted" story. In late October 2012, the book won the 2012 Grand Prix du roman de l'Académie française. It was also shortlisted for the Prix Goncourt and the Prix Femina. In November 2012, it was awarded the Prix Goncourt des Lycéens. For this prize, 2000 French-speaking high school students vote on their favorite novel from the year's Prix Goncourt shortlist. In summer 2013 the book knocked Dan Brown's Inferno from the top of bestseller lists all over Europe. Early readers of the English translation have described the book as "literary and clever". Considered Switzerland's answer to The Girl with the Dragon Tattoo, and compared to the fiction of Nabokov and Roth as well as the television series Twin Peaks, The Truth About the Harry Quebert Affair was published in the United States by Penguin on 27 May 2014. It was one of the biggest original acquisitions in the history of Penguin Books.

== Television adaptation ==
In August 2017, Epix and MGM Television announced that production for a 10-episode TV series named after the book was underway. Principal photography started in mid-August in Forestville, Canada and moved to Montreal in September to finish production in December. On 6 April 2018, 35 minutes of scenes from the series premiered at Canneseries, the television festival held in Cannes, France, each year. In the United States, the premier occurred on Epix on 4 September 2018, and the 10-episode show concluded its run on 6 November 2018. American actor Patrick Dempsey played Harry Quebert, while Ben Schnetzer, Damon Wayans Jr. and Virginia Madsen played other roles.
