= Scoundrels (TV series) =

American comedy-drama TV series (2010)

- A poster marketing the show's pilot
- Genre: Comedy drama
- Based on: Outrageous Fortune by James Griffin & Rachel Lang
- Developed by: Lyn Greene; Richard Levine
- Starring: Virginia Madsen; David James Elliott; Patrick Flueger; Leven Rambin; Vanessa Marano; Carlos Bernard
- Composer: Peter Himmelman
- Country of origin: United States
- Original language: English
- No. of seasons: 1
- No. of episodes: 8

Production
- Executive producers: Lyn Greene; Richard Levine; Francie Calfo; Michael R. Goldstein; Michael G. Larkin; Bruce Cervi; John Lansing; John Barnett; Ken Topolsky
- Running time: 43 minutes
- Production companies: Old Friends Productions; Long Run Productions; South Pacific Pictures; ABC Studios

Original release
- Network: ABC
- Release: June 20 – August 15, 2010

Related
- Outrageous Fortune; Good Behavior; Honest

Scoundrels is an American comedy-drama television series that aired on the ABC network. It is based on the New Zealand TV series Outrageous Fortune. The one-hour comedy-drama premiered on Sunday, June 20, 2010 at 9 pm. The eight-episode run ended on August 15, 2010.

== Plot ==
Cheryl West is a middle-aged woman with four children: twin brothers Logan and Cal, and daughters Heather, an aspiring model and Hope, the youngest and an aspiring filmmaker. After Cheryl's career criminal husband Wolf is sentenced to five years in prison, Cheryl forces her family to quit its criminal activities. However, even from jail, Wolf interferes with her attempts to reform their family.

== Cast ==
- Virginia Madsen as Cheryl West
- David James Elliott as Wolfgang "Wolf" West
- Patrick Flueger as Logan and Calvin "Cal" West (twins)
- Leven Rambin as Heather West
- Vanessa Marano as Hope West
- Carlos Bernard as Sergeant Mack

== Development and production ==
The series is based on the New Zealand TV series Outrageous Fortune, which was created by James Griffin and Rachel Lang. (See also "Honest" starring Amanda Redman - a British version of the New Zealand series which transmitted on ITV in 2008.) Lyn Greene and Richard Levine wrote the pilot of Scoundrels for American television, and they serve as the series show runners. ABC green-lit the series in January 2010 with an eight episode order.

Madsen was cast in early February, followed by Flueger. Rambin came on board in late February, along with Neal McDonough, who was originally cast as Wolf West. Filming began March 16, 2010 in Albuquerque, New Mexico. Three days into the shoot, McDonough was replaced by David James Elliot due to McDonough's religious beliefs and refusal to film sex scenes.

This was ABC's second attempt at reformatting Outrageous Fortune for an American audience. In 2008, a pilot named Good Behavior wasn't picked up by the network.

== Reception ==
The series pilot "And Jill Came Tumbling After" received mixed reviews with The Boston Herald claiming the show was "wicked fun" and praised the show's cast. A reviewer from The Boston Globe was quoted to say "Not a single one of the characters were funny enough, or touching enough, to make me want to see more of them. If the Wests were thrown in jail, I’d be tempted to throw away the key." On the review collaboration site Metacritic, Scoundrels currently holds 56% (mixed or average) based on 18 critic reviews. The show's second episode Mary, Mary, Quite Contrary got overall a better response than the pilot with it earning positive reviews. TV Fanatic gave the episode 3/5 saying "the episode was an improvement on the pilot, with the characters developing and the show overall finding its tone and footing a bit." and "there were decent dramatic moments and good laughs in “Mary, Mary, Quite Contrary."

== Cancellation ==
On October 24, 2010 it was revealed on ABC's Twitter page that Scoundrels would not be returning for another season.

== Episodes ==
No.	Title	Directed by	Written by	Original release date	US viewers (millions)
1	"And Jill Came Tumbling After"	Julie Anne Robinson	Lyn Greene & Richard Levine	June 20, 2010	5.17
2	"Mary, Mary, Quite Contrary"	Julie Anne Robinson	Lyn Greene & Richard Levine	June 27, 2010	3.63
3	"Liar, Liar, Pants on Fire"	Michael Katleman	Rick Cleveland	July 11, 2010	3.00
4	"Where Have You Been, Charming Billy?"	Michael Katleman	Lisa Melamed	July 18, 2010	3.16
5	"Yes, Sir, Yes, Sir, Three Bags Full"	Deran Sarafian	Joy Gregory	July 25, 2010	3.1
6	"Birds of a Feather Flock Together"	Deran Sarafian	Lisa Melamed	August 1, 2010	3.22
7	"That's the Way the Money Goes"	John Scott	Joy Gregory	August 8, 2010	3.33
8	"Who's Afraid of the Big Bad Wolf?"	John Scott	Rick Cleveland	August 15, 2010	2.84

== Ratings ==
=== U.S. Nielsen ratings ===
==== Weekly ratings ====
Episode Number	Episode	Rating	Share	Rating/Share (18-49)	Viewers (millions)	Rank (Timeslot)	Rank (Night)
1	"And Jill Came Tumbling After"	3.5	6	1.3/4	5.17	2	3
2	"Mary Mary Quite Contrary"	3.3	4	1.1/3	3.63	4	7
3	"Liar, Liar, Pants on Fire"	2.0	3	0.8/2	3.00	4	15
4	"Where Have You Been, Charming Billy?"	2.1	4	0.7/2	3.16	4	14
5	"Yes, Sir, Yes, Sir, Three Bags Full"	2.1	3	3.10	4	14	
6	"Birds of a Feather Flock Together"	2.0	3	0.7/2	3.22	4	13
7	"That's the Way the Money Goes"	2.1	3	0.8/2	3.33	4	14
8	"Who's Afraid Of the Big Bad Wolf?"	1.8	3	0.8/2	2.84	4	14

==== Seasonal ratings ====
Season	Episodes	Original airing			Viewers (in millions)	Network
Season	Episodes	Season premiere	Season finale	TV Season	Viewers (in millions)	Network
1	8	June 20, 2010	August 15, 2010	2009–2010	3.43	ABC

=== Canadian ratings ===
Episode Number	Episode	Viewers (millions)	Rank (Week)
1	"And Jill Came Tumbling After"	1.041	#17
2	"Mary Mary Quite Contrary"	1.260	#15
3	"Liar, Liar, Pants on Fire"	0.936	#28
4	"Where Have You Been, Charming Billy?"	0.925	#28
