= Every Day (2010 film) =

- Directed by: Richard Levine
- Written by: Richard Levine
- Produced by: Miranda Bailey; Matthew Leutwyler
- Starring: Liev Schreiber; Helen Hunt; Carla Gugino; Ezra Miller; Skyler Fortgang; David Harbour; Eddie Izzard; Brian Dennehy
- Cinematography: Nancy Schreiber
- Edited by: Pat Wise
- Music by: Jeanine Tesori
- Production companies: Ambush Entertainment; Cold Iron Pictures
- Distributed by: Image Entertainment
- Release dates: April 24, 2010 (Tribeca); January 24, 2011
- Running time: 93 minutes
- Country: United States
- Language: English
- Budget: $3 million
- Box office: $46,029

Every Day is a 2010 comedy-drama film written and directed by Richard Levine and starring Liev Schreiber, Helen Hunt, Carla Gugino, Eddie Izzard, Ezra Miller, and Brian Dennehy.

== Synopsis ==
Ned (Schrieber) is a man under pressure. As a scriptwriter, his boss (Izzard) is pushing him to add extra shocks into his latest project. As a husband, he is coping with his stressed out wife (Hunt) and her sick, alcoholic father (Dennehy). As a father, he is worried about his gay son (Miller) coming out, and watching his youngest (Fortgang) spiral into perfectionism-induced anxiety. When he is assigned a provocative free spirit (Gugino) as a writing partner, he is forced to examine whether the life he has is really the life he wants.

== Cast ==
- Liev Schreiber as Ned Freed
- Helen Hunt as Jeannie Freed
- Carla Gugino as Robin
- Ezra Miller as Jonah Freed
- Skyler Fortgang as Ethan Freed
- David Harbour as Brian
- Eddie Izzard as Garrett
- Brian Dennehy as Ernie Freed

== Reception ==
Every Day was an official selection for the 2010 Tribeca Film Festival, where it was met with lukewarm reviews. Adam Keleman of Slant Magazine called the film "a quaint but inane portrait of a modern-day Big Apple family". Stephen Holden of The New York Times said the film is very well written and acted.

=== Box office ===
Every Day was released in theaters on January 11, 2011. At its widest release, the film was only shown in four theaters, and grossed $46,209, far below its $3 million production budget.

=== Critical response ===
Every Day received mixed reviews from critics. Rotten Tomatoes gives the film a score of 34% based on reviews from 32 critics. At Metacritic the film received a score of 48 based on reviews from 12 critics.

== Home media ==
Every Day was released on DVD on March 8, 2011.
