= Ben Schnetzer =

American actor (born 1990)

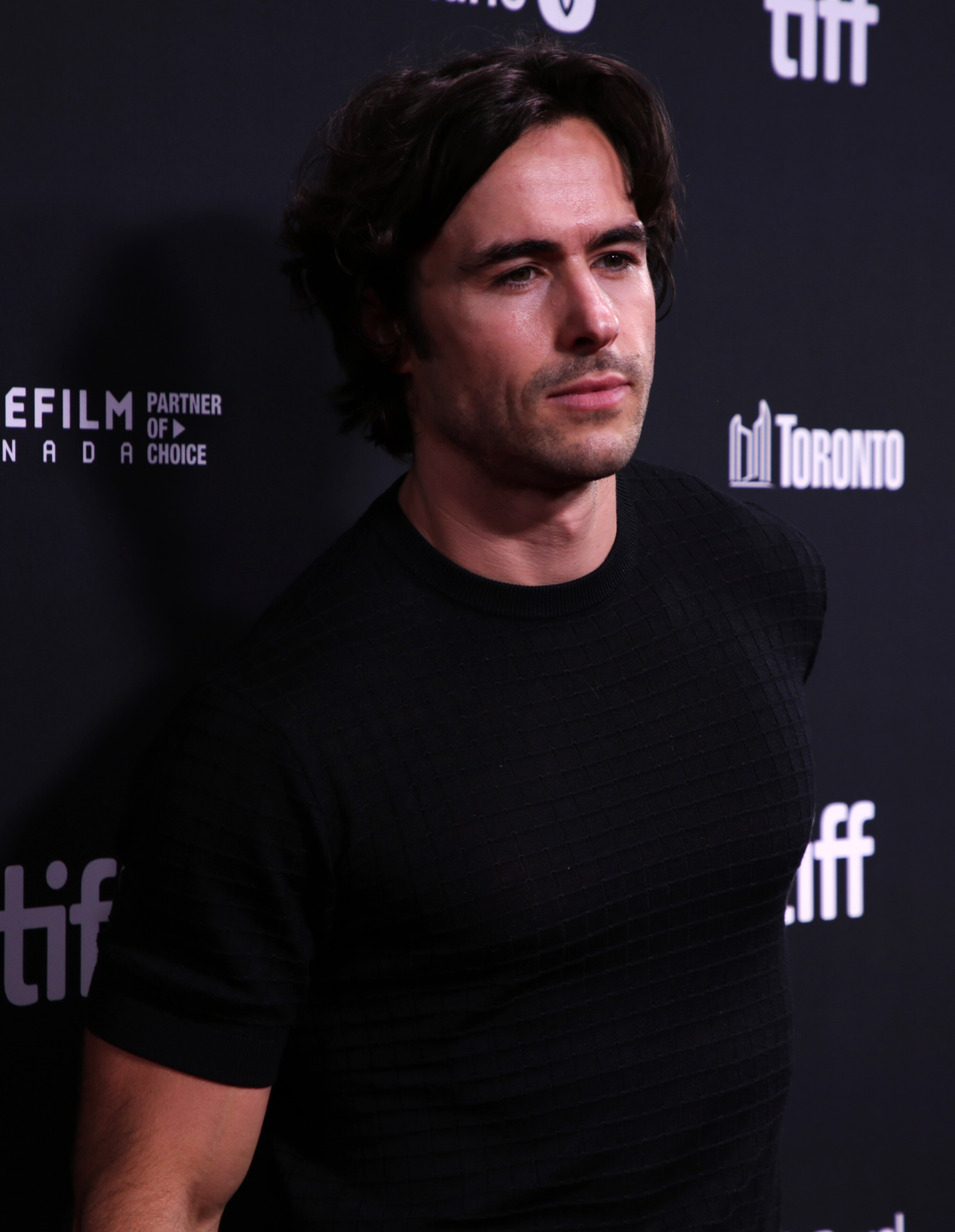
- Schnetzer at the 2025 Toronto International Film Festival
- Born: New York City, New York, U.S.
- Education: Guildhall School of Music and Drama
- Occupation: Actor
- Years active: 2007–present
- Partner: Kate Hewitt
- Children: 2
- Parents: Stephen Schnetzer (father); Nancy Snyder (mother)

Ben Schnetzer is an American actor. He was nominated for two British Independent Film Awards for his performance in the film Pride (2014). His other films include The Book Thief (2013), The Riot Club (2014), and The Grizzlies (2018).

== Early life ==
Schnetzer is the son of actor Stephen Schnetzer, whose father had German, Irish, and Algerian ancestry, and actress Nancy Snyder. He graduated from the Guildhall School of Music and Drama in London.

== Career ==
In 2010, Schnetzer appeared in an episode of Law & Order, the longest-running live-action scripted American primetime series, and had a supporting role in the ABC series Happy Town.

As he began appearing in British films, Schnetzer was praised for his "superb mastery of accents". During his final year at Guildhall, he landed the role of Max Vandenburg in the film adaptation of The Book Thief (2013). The following year, he starred as activist Mark Ashton in the historical film Pride, for which he received critical acclaim and two BIFA nominations. That same year, he played British-Greek Oxford University student Dimitri Mitropoulos in The Riot Club.

Schnetzer starred as Brad Land alongside Nick Jonas in Goat, a 2016 film about college hazing. That same year, he starred as Ross in Punk's Dead as well as appearing in Warcraft and Snowden. He played British-Kenyan journalist Dan Eldon in the biopic The Journey Is the Destination.

Schnetzer returned to television in 2018 with a role as Marcus Goldman in the Epix miniseries adaptation of Joël Dicker's The Truth About the Harry Quebert Affair. He made his Broadway debut in The Nap at Samuel J. Friedman Theatre. He had film roles in Entebbe, The Grizzlies, The Death & Life of John F. Donovan, and Saint Judy in 2018 as well as The Giant in 2019. Nell Meadow of RogerEbert.com called Schnetzer's performances "exceptional" in a 2020 review of The Grizzlies and praised ability to disappear into his roles in The Book Thief, Snowden, and Pride.

In 2020, Schnetzer was cast as protagonist Yorick Brown in the 2021 FX on Hulu adaptation of the post-apocalyptic comic Y: The Last Man. In 2024, he played the role of young Mike Evans in the Netflix science fiction series 3 Body Problem.

In September 2022, Schnetzer played Eli in the European premiere of Eureka Day at The Old Vic in London.

== Personal life ==
Schnetzer is in a relationship with Kate Hewitt, a theatre and television director from Newcastle upon Tyne. The couple have a daughter and a son.

== Filmography ==
=== Film ===
Year	Title	Role	Notes
2007	Ben's Plan	Ben Stephens	
2013	The Book Thief	Max Vandenburg	
2014	Pride	Mark Ashton	
2014	The Riot Club	Dimitri Mitropoulos	
2016	Goat	Brad Land	
2016	Punk's Dead	Ross	
2016	Warcraft	Khadgar	
2016	Snowden	Gabriel Sol	
2016	The Journey Is the Destination	Dan Eldon	
2018	Entebbe	Zeev Hirsch	
2018	The Grizzlies	Russ Sheppard	
2018	The Death & Life of John F. Donovan	Rupert Turner	
2018	Saint Judy	Parker	
2019	The Giant	Joe	
2025	Swiped	Sean Rad	
2025	The Yellow Tie	Sergiu Celibidache	

=== Television ===
Year	Title	Role	Notes
2010	Law & Order	Dustin Henry	Episode: "Crashers"
2010	Happy Town	Andrew Haplin	8 episodes
2018	The Truth About the Harry Quebert Affair	Marcus Goldman	10 episodes
2019	Gone Hollywood	Robbie Riese	TV movie
2021	Y: The Last Man	Yorick Brown	10 episodes
2024	3 Body Problem	Young Mike Evans	
2026	The Madison	Van Davis	

== Stage ==
Year	Title	Role	Notes
2014	Sticks and Bones	David	Pershing Square Signature Center, New York
2018	The Nap	Dylan Spokes	Samuel J. Friedman Theatre, New York
2022	Eureka Day	Eli	Old Vic, London

== Awards and nominations ==
Year	Award	Category	Nominated work	Result
2014	British Independent Film Awards	Best Supporting Actor	Pride	Nominated
2014	British Independent Film Awards	Most Promising Newcomer	Pride	Nominated
