= Submission (2017 film) =

2017 film directed by Richard Levine

- Theatrical release poster
- Directed by: Richard Levine
- Written by: Richard Levine
- Based on: Blue Angel by Francine Prose
- Produced by: Wren Arthur; Jared Ian Goldman
- Starring: Stanley Tucci; Addison Timlin; Kyra Sedgwick; Janeane Garofalo
- Cinematography: Hillary Spera
- Edited by: Jennifer Lee
- Music by: Jeff Russo
- Production companies: Mighty Engine; Olive Productions; Ospringe Media Limited
- Distributed by: Great Point Media; Paladin
- Release dates: June 19, 2017 (LA Film Festival); March 2, 2018 (United States)
- Running time: 106 minutes
- Country: United States
- Language: English

Submission is a 2017 American drama film written and directed by Richard Levine, based on the 2000 novel Blue Angel by Francine Prose. The film stars Stanley Tucci as a college professor who becomes obsessed with a student (Addison Timlin). The film had its world premiere at the Los Angeles Film Festival on June 19, 2017.

== Plot ==
After publishing his first novel, which earns him a little fame, Ted Swenson begins his career as a creative writing teacher at Euston College in Vermont, hoping to soon leave it after he publishes another hit novel, but gets stuck in that job for about 10 years and becomes a tenured professor. One of his students, Angela Argo, requests him to read the first chapter of her novel, Eggs, which he does and finds the writing style impressive. His colleague Magda tells him about the vulgar poems Angela wrote when she took her class, and tells him that she actually insisted on making it a donation to the college library. Though librarians found the poetry about a phone sex worker rather obscene, they decided to keep it as an act of good faith.

Ted checks out that poetry book which primarily consists of erotic conversations between a phone sex worker named Angela 911 and her clients. Later, he attends a dinner at his colleague's place along with his wife Sherrie, where they all discuss the new campus sexual harassment rule-book and how political correctness is affecting their teaching style.

Ted praises Angela's writing and encourages her to write more; she in turn gives him increasingly erotic later chapters of her novel. Ted, reading her novel, which is about a teenage girl sexualizing her science teacher, starts imagining himself as that science teacher, but tries to keep their relationship professional. One day, Angela asks him to give her a ride to Burlington to get a new laptop. After returning to the school, she invites him into her dorm room to set up her computer. Though reluctant, Ted follows her and soon, she comes onto him and they quickly begin to have sex. However, before they can finish, Ted's weak tooth comes out and they humorously decide to postpone sex for some other time. While leaving her room, Ted meets one of his other students who eyes him suspiciously.

One day during class, Angela blatantly tells another student that her plot and characters are weak. While the students expect Ted to reprimand her, he does nothing and, after everyone leaves, Angela asks Ted to show her novel to his agent. Though surprised, Ted agrees, but the agent shows disinterest in reading a newbie's novel. Later, Ted tries to explain the situation to Angela but she becomes furious, shouting that she only slept with him in hopes of getting to a reputed agent through him. Shocked, Ted says he didn't think their relationship had anything to do with business and Angela angrily leaves.

The next day, Ted gets a call from the university board and learns that Angela has filed a sexual harassment suit against him and produced tape of their previous day's conversation as proof. Everyone, including his wife, blames him and, after his students and some faculty members testify against him, he loses his job, marriage and reputation. However, Angela gets a call from Ted's agent, who now shows interest in her work in light of the controversy. Fifteen months later, Ted is writing his memoirs in a cafeteria. When he sees a woman at his table reading Eggs, he asks her how she likes the book.

== Cast ==
- Addison Timlin as Angela Argo
- Stanley Tucci as Ted Swenson
- Kyra Sedgwick as Sherrie Swenson
- Janeane Garofalo as Magda Moynahan
- Peter Gallagher as Len Curry
- Colby Minifie as Ruby Swenson
- Ritchie Coster as Dean Bentham
- Alison Bartlett as Angela's Mother
- David Pittu as Bernard Levy

== Reception ==
On review aggregator website Rotten Tomatoes, the film holds an approval rating of 50%, based on 42 reviews, with an average rating of 5.8/10. The site's critics consensus reads: "It's thoughtful and well-acted, but Submission falls frustratingly short in its attempt to offer insightful commentary through its timely premise." Metacritic gave the film a score of 52 out of 100 based on 13 critical reviews, indicating "mixed or average reviews".
