= Lemon Parade Revisited =

Studio album by Tonic
- Released: July 22, 2016
- Recorded: 2016
- Genre: Acoustic rock
- Length: 53:47
- Label: None (self-released)
- Producer: Tonic

Tonic chronology
Tonic (2010)	Lemon Parade Revisited (2016)

Lemon Parade Revisited is the fifth studio album by American post-grunge band Tonic. The project was originally announced on March 22, 2016 as a celebration of the 20th anniversary of Tonic's first album, Lemon Parade, with recording and production immediately after the announcement. This marked the first time Tonic had utilized funding directly from fans, a trend that had become a viable production method for other musicians in prior years. Direct funding allowed the band to offer a variety of products, incentives, and experiences for those choosing to fund the album. Lemon Parade Revisited also marked the first time any Tonic album was available to purchase commercially as a vinyl record. The album was released on July 22, 2016, and the band had tour dates throughout the remainder of the year.

== Production ==
In March 2016, Tonic announced that, in celebration of Lemon Parade's 20th anniversary, they would utilize direct funding from fans via the PledgeMusic website to record and release an all-acoustic version of that album. This funding platform method allows purchasers to pre-order the album in various formats, including marking the first time any Tonic album has been commercially available as a vinyl record. Other incentives and items offered by the band included handwritten lyric pages for the purchaser's choice of one track from the album, access to exclusive video and content updates showing the behind-the-scenes creative process, and even an offer to purchase a private concert by the band.

== Track listing ==
All songs by Emerson Hart except where noted.

1. "Open Up Your Eyes" − 3:41
2. "Casual Affair" (Tonic) − 4:00
3. "If You Could Only See" − 4:31
4. "Soldier's Daughter" − 5:25
5. "Lemon Parade" (Hart, Jeff Russo) − 4:01
6. "Mountain" − 5:13
7. "Thick" − 4:27
8. "Wicked Soldier" (Tonic) − 4:51
9. "Mr. Golden Deal" − 4:56
10. "Bigot Sunshine" − 3:12
11. "Celtic Aggression" (Hart, Dan Rothchild, Russo) − 3:32
12. "My Old Man" − 5:58

== Personnel ==
Tonic

- Emerson Hart: Vocals, Guitar, Percussion
- Jeff Russo: Guitar, Vocals, Percussion, Organ [Wurlitzer]
- Dan Lavery: Bass, Vocals, Percussion, Keyboards [Additional]

Production

- Produced by: Tonic
- Engineered and Mixed by: Michael Eisenstein
- Mastered by: Drunk Dragon
- Mastered in: Los Angeles
- Mixed by: Dan Lavery
- Art Direction: Doug Nahory
