= Tonic (band) =

American rock band

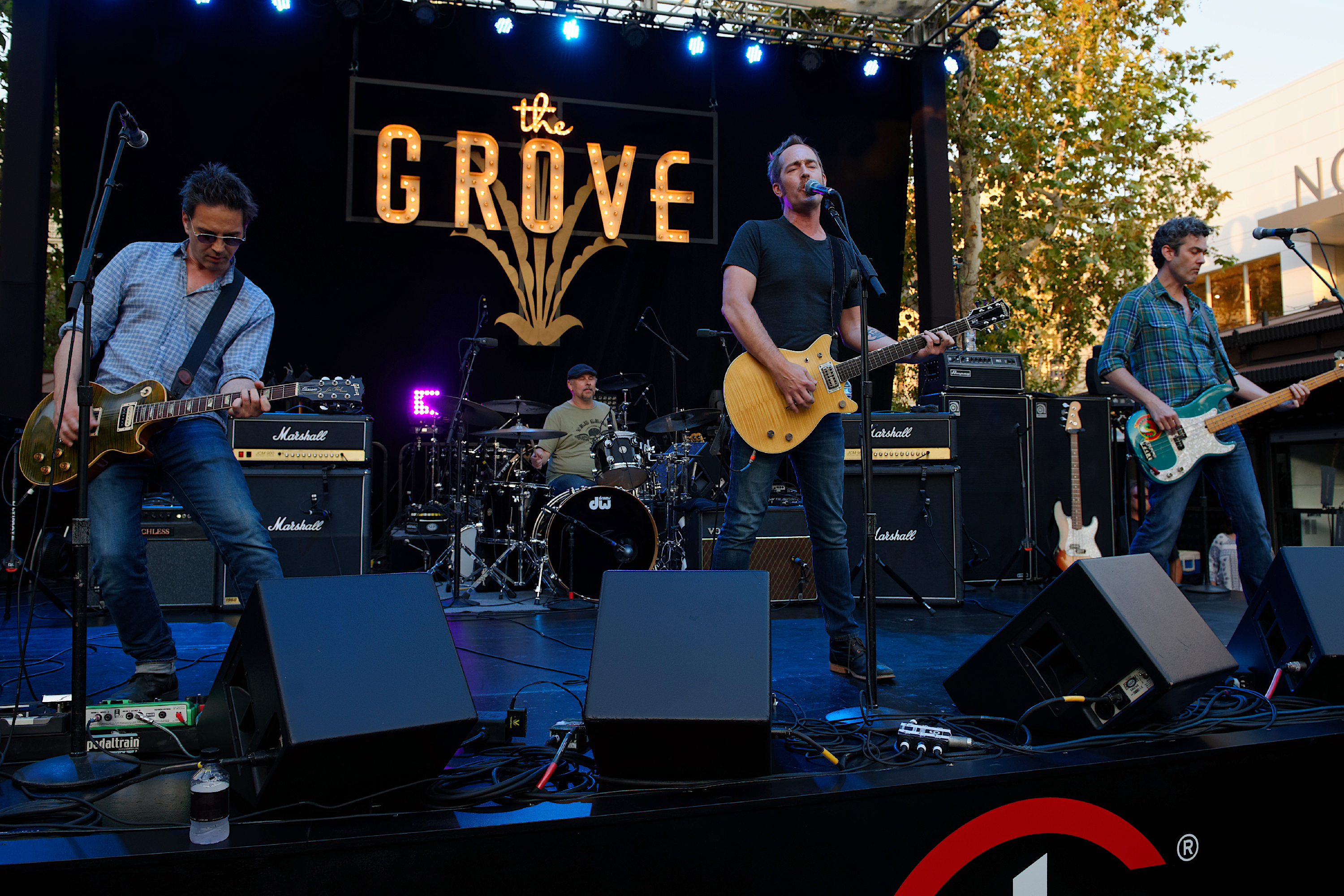
- Tonic performing at The Grove at Farmers Market in 2016

Background information
- Origin: Los Angeles, California, U.S.
- Genres: Alternative rock, post-grunge
- Years active: 1993–2004; 2008–present
- Labels: Polydor; A&M; Universal; 429
- Members: Emerson Hart; Jeff Russo; Dan Lavery
- Past members: Dan Rothchild; Kevin Shepard
- Website: Official website

Tonic is an American rock band, formed in 1993 by Emerson Hart and Jeff Russo. Later members have included Dan Lavery, Kevin Shepard, Pierce Bowers and Dan Rothchild. The band signed with Polydor Records in 1995, through which they released their debut studio album Lemon Parade (1996). Despite lukewarm critical and commercial response, it spawned the singles "Open Up Your Eyes" and "If You Could Only See" in 1997, which significantly entered several Billboard charts, including Adult Alternative Airplay, Radio Songs, Alternative Airplay and Mainstream Rock. The album received platinum certification by the Recording Industry Association of America (RIAA).

Tonic spent much of the next two years touring, adding to its reputation as a relentlessly gigging band. In addition to extensive touring, Tonic produced other work, including songs for film soundtracks. After self-producing their second album Sugar (1999), Tonic released their third album Head on Straight in 2002.

Tonic has received two Grammy Award nominations from Head on Straight, including one for Best Rock Performance by a Duo or Group with Vocal for "Take Me As I Am", and one for Best Rock Album. The band then went on hiatus beginning in 2004 while its members pursued other musical endeavors. It was not until late 2008 Tonic became active again, embarking on a tour and releasing a greatest-hits compilation, all of which served as a prelude to their self-titled fourth studio album (2010). After the release of that album, Tonic has continued to tour and remain active, utilizing direct funding from fans to make an all-acoustic version of Lemon Parade titled Lemon Parade Revisited in 2016, and debuting their first non-album single with 2021's "To Be Loved".

== History ==
=== 1993–1998 ===
The record as a whole is full of the heavy, distortion-laden Tonic sound, and guitars that make them who they are.

— Music critic Shawn M. Haney reviews Lemon Parade for All Music Guide

Tonic was founded by Emerson Hart and guitarist Jeff Russo, long-separated childhood friends who randomly crossed paths at a Los Angeles, California area pool hall in 1993. The pair quickly began collaborating on music writing, and soon added bass player Dan Rothchild, whom they met at a venue named The Kibitz Room. The final addition to the band was drummer Kevin Shepard, who was recruited at an L.A. venue named Masker's Cafe.

Hart later said the original choice for the band's name was Radio Flyer, but upon learning that name was unavailable, selected Tonic instead (the band later referenced the term Radio Flyer in their song "Top Falls Down"). The newly formed group performed gigs around the Los Angeles, California area prior to signing their first professional recording contract in 1995. Earning a reputation as a "relentlessly gigging" band, Tonic played over 300 shows in less than two years during the mid-to-late 1990s.

Teaming with producer Jack Joseph Puig, Tonic released their debut album Lemon Parade on July 15, 1996. Music critic Shawn M. Haney said of the album that, "The record as a whole is full of the heavy, distortion-laden Tonic sound, and guitars that make them who they are." Singles for the songs "Open Up Your Eyes" and "If You Could Only See", were released in 1996 and 1997 respectively. The single "If You Could Only See" received the honor of being Rock Radio's most played song of 1997, and Lemon Parade as an album reached platinum status. Music videos were created for the songs "Open Up Your Eyes," "If You Could Only See," and "Soldier's Daughter." The Lemon Parade album spent 57 weeks on the Billboard 200 chart, reaching a peak of No. 28 during the week of August 2, 1997. By February 2003 Lemon Parade's running total of albums sold had reached 1.3 million copies.

Dan Lavery replaced Rothchild on bass in December 1996, and around this same time period drummer Shepard ceased full-time activity with the band for family and personal reasons. Tonic performed on the R.O.A.R. Tour in 1997. The year 1997 marked the band's first contribution to an original soundtrack, recording the song "Eyes of Sand" for the Scream 2 soundtrack. Continuing their work on film soundtracks into 1998, Tonic recorded the song "Flower Man" for The X-Files: The Album, and performed a cover of the song Everybody's Talkin' for the Clay Pigeons soundtrack. Tonic also performed a cover of the song "Second Hand News" for the album "Legacy: A Tribute to Fleetwood Mac's Rumours." The band finished 1998 by contributing a live version of the song "Open Up Your Eyes" to the charitable album Live in the X Lounge.

=== 1999–2003 ===
...there are no bad songs to be found anywhere on the entire album, each one bearing its own redeeming qualities, whether a driving beat or a tenacious scrap of melody...

— Music critic Mathias Sheaks reviews Sugar for All Music Guide

On March 1, 1999 the band released the now out-of-print Live and Enhanced CD, which featured an acoustic version of "If You Could Only See" and the previously unreleased music video of "Soldier's Daughter". The band returned to the studio to self-produce their second album. Released on November 9, 1999, the album title Sugar shared the same name as the fifth track on the recording. The creative and collaborative process spanned several geographic locations including Austin, Texas, and a 15,000-square-foot (1,400 m^{2}) mansion in New Orleans, Louisiana, where actual recording for the album was performed. "Knock Down Walls" and "You Wanted More" were charting singles released off the record, with the latter having first appeared on the soundtrack to the movie American Pie. With Shepard no longer part of the band, Peter Maloney played drums on the album, although Joey Waronker filled in for the single "You Wanted More". Music videos for the songs "You Wanted More" and "Mean to Me" were created as part of the album's promotion. Tonic appeared on the television shows Late Night with Conan O'Brien and The Martin Short Show in late 1999 as part of additional promotion. Sugar spent eight total weeks on the Billboard 200 chart, reaching a peak of No. 81 in its first week of release.

A cover of the song "East Bound and Down" for the King of the Hill original television soundtrack rounded out the group's output for the year 1999. The band later contributed a performance of "Mean To Me" to the fourth installment in the charitable Live in the X Lounge album series. In 2000, Tonic allowed their song "Mean To Me" from their album Sugar to be released as a single from the soundtrack album for the Warner Bros. film Gossip, which was directed by Academy Award-winning director Davis Guggenheim. The band appeared in the music video for the song, which featured clips from the film as well as actors from it, who seemingly appear to be interacting with the band via webcam as they perform the song.

Tonic took a break from constant touring and recording, time which Hart used to, "...make sure the next record would be coming from fresh eyes and ears" after he moved to a new home in Nashville, Tennessee. In 2002, the band began collaborating with producer Bob Rock on their next studio recording. In contrast to the "exhausting" experience of self-producing Sugar, producer Rock's "laid-back efficiency" and Hawaii studio location provided a welcome change. The resulting studio album, Head on Straight, was released on September 1, 2002.

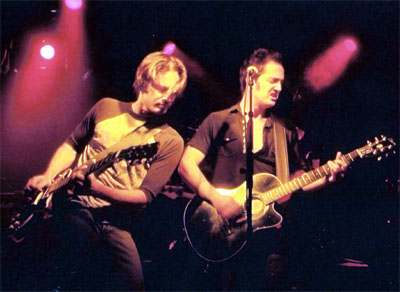
Hart and Russo in 2002

While still billed as a three-piece band, Joey Waronker performed much of the drumming on "Head On Straight," and the band also utilized drummer Kevin Murphy for some live performances during this time period. The band also enlisted the help of Keyboardist Will Holis. Hart and Russo both also played piano and Rhodes synth respectively on the record. Head on Straight charted on the Billboard 200 for one week, where it was No. 141. In its review of the album, Rolling Stone described it by saying it was, "...less rootsy and harder-rocking than previous efforts." In March 2003 Tonic embarked on an acoustic tour, and as band member Russo said, they were hoping to, "...bring things back to a level where we remember what it's all about."

=== Hiatus ===
It wasn’t like we broke the band up. Everyone just went to their own corner and did their own thing. We figured when it was time to get back together it will happen.

— Jeff Russo comments on Tonic's 2004–2008 hiatus

While Head on Straight had sold 34,000 copies by February 2003, in 2003 the band received two Grammy nominations, one for Best Rock Performance by a Duo or Group with Vocal for "Take Me As I Am", and one for Best Rock Album. While the band's activity began to diminish, they participated in the annual The Rock Boat music-themed cruise, performing there in 2004 for instance. The grind of constant touring over the previous seven years had taken its toll on the band, and each member needed some space.

Tonic went on hiatus beginning in 2004, all three members began working on other projects unrelated to Tonic. Hart released a solo album entitled Cigarettes and Gasoline on July 17, 2007. Russo became part of the band Low Stars, who released a self-titled CD in 2007. Lavery did song writing for projects including the feature-length movies The Passion of the Christ and Elektra, and began playing bass on tour for The Fray in March 2007. Commenting on this time period, Russo said, "It wasn’t like we broke the band up. Everyone just went to their own corner and did their own thing. We figured when it was time to get back together it will happen."

=== Band reactivation ===
The first verifiable account that Tonic was reuniting came in November 2008 via an announcement from band member Russo, confirming new tour dates and a forthcoming studio album. "We're [planning on] getting together to write some new material," Russo said. "Over the last 6 months or so we've been talking about it. We've been doing different things for the last 6 years, and we all decided that we missed rocking."

At the end of the day we've always relied on the cream rising to the top and creating a great product and great songs and being honest about where we are.

— Emerson Hart comments during an interview about the Tonic album

Officially active again, Tonic had already played their first show together in many years on September 16, 2008 at a venue in Antioch, Illinois. As part of the band's 2009 tour, a greatest hits compilation titled A Casual Affair: The Best of Tonic was released. The album featured live versions of the songs "Irish" and "Sugar" in addition to an acoustic version of "You Wanted More." November 2009 marked the band's inclusion in the video game Band Hero, as the track "If You Could Only See" was a playable song in the game.

After the year 2010 began, Tonic announced that their self-titled fourth studio album would be released on May 4, 2010. The album was primarily recorded over the span of a month during fall 2009 at Conway Studios in Hollywood. Pete Maloney also continued his longtime association with the band by playing drums on the album. The album was jointly produced by Tonic and Nathaniel Kunkel, with the song "Release Me" chosen as the first single from the album. A promotional behind the scenes tour of Conway Studios hosted by Emerson Hart was made available on Amazon.com's Tonic store and YouTube at the time. In an official press release for the album, bandmember Hart said about Tonic that, "When we play music together it feels like going home. Getting together, playing some rock-n-roll, it's the best feeling in the world." The self-titled album spent one week on the Billboard 200 chart, where it ranked 150. Tonic continued to tour in conjunction with the release of their self-titled album into late 2011.

=== 2011 and beyond ===
Many of you have been asking about Lemon Parade and if we were doing anything special to commemorate its 20th anniversary. The answer is, “why yes we are.” We’re currently re-recording a very special acoustic version of the album.

— Part of Tonic's announcement regarding the launch of their fan-direct funding campaign to record an all-acoustic version of Lemon Parade

Tonic continued to actively tour into 2011. As 2012 began, the band made official announcements via their Twitter feed that writing and recording on new songs had begun. The band continued periodically playing shows throughout the course of 2012, with mention of some vocals for new songs being recorded on July 21. In June 2012, Tonic partnered with Hard Rock International to become "Artist Ambassadors," traveling to Haiti to raise awareness of hunger issues still affecting many residents of the country. Hart provided an update to the band's studio recording work in December 2012, saying the band was debating whether to release their upcoming studio recordings as either an EP or a full studio album. As the band continued to tour periodically into the start of the year 2014, Hart announced he was releasing a new solo album, and Russo began scoring the television series Fargo and various other film, TV and video game projects.

In March 2016, Tonic announced that in celebration of Lemon Parade's 20th anniversary, they would utilize direct funding from fans via the PledgeMusic website to record and release an all-acoustic version of that album. This funding platform method allows purchasers to pre-order the album in various formats, including marking the first time any Tonic album has been commercially available as a vinyl record. Other incentives and items offered by the band included handwritten lyric pages for the purchaser's choice of one track from the album, access to exclusive video and content updates showing the behind-the-scenes creative process, and even an offer to purchase a private concert by the band.

By 2021, the band was still periodically active while each member continued to find success individually, such as Russo's 2017 Emmy win for Outstanding Music Composition for a Limited Series, Movie, or Special (Original Dramatic Score) for his continued work scoring Fargo, and Hart releasing his 2019 solo album, 32 Thousand Days. During the COVID-19 pandemic, the band worked together to record new music. As the music industry continued to evolve, it had become increasingly common for artists to periodically release stand-alone digital music singles, especially on popular music streaming services such as Spotify and Amazon Music. To this end, Tonic released their first non-album single on February 12, 2021 with a track titled "To Be Loved", followed shortly after by the release of their first music video in nearly 20 years with the debut of the official lyric video for the track. This was followed shortly thereafter by the release of "If You Could Only See (25th Anniversary)" as another single, consisting of a new recording of the band's single from Lemon Parade.

== Members ==
=== Current members ===
- Emerson Hart – lead vocals, rhythm guitar (1993–2004, 2008–present)
- Jeff Russo – lead guitar, backing vocals (1993–2004, 2008–present)
- Dan Lavery – bass, backing vocals (1996–2004, 2008–present)

==== Current touring musicians ====
- Rich Scannella – drums (2008–present)
- Graham Whitford – lead guitar (2022–present; substitute for Jeff Russo)

=== Former members ===
- Dan Rothchild – bass, backing vocals (1993–1996)
- Kevin Shepard – drums (1993–1996)

==== Former touring musicians ====
- Pete Maloney – drums (1996–1997)
- Miles McPherson – drums (1997, 2000–2001)
- Ian O'Neill – drums (1997–2000)
- Kevin Murphy - drums (1999–2010)
- Kasey Todd – drums (2001–2004)
- Jace Everett – bass (1996)

== Discography ==
Studio albums

- Lemon Parade (1996)
- Sugar (1999)
- Head on Straight (2002)
- Tonic (2010)
- Lemon Parade Revisited (2016)
