= Richard Levine (filmmaker) =

Writer, director, actor and producer

Richard Levine is a writer, director, actor and producer. He wrote and directed the film Submission (2017), starring Stanley Tucci, Kyra Sedgwick and Addison Timlin. The film is based on the best selling novel Blue Angel, by Francine Prose and premiered at the Los Angeles Film Festival. His first film, Every Day (2010), starring Liev Schreiber, Helen Hunt, Eddie Izzard and Brian Dennehy, was a New York Times critic's pick.

Levine and his writing partner Lynnie Greene created, wrote and executive produced the Epix series, The Truth About The Harry Quebert Affair, starring Patrick Dempsey, directed by Jean-Jacques Annaud as well as the Amazon Video pilot, The Interestings directed by Mike Newell.

He was a writer, director and executive producer of the Golden Globe Award winning series, Nip/Tuck, for all of its seven seasons as well as the Golden Globe Award nominated series, Boss, starring Kelsey Grammer. He wrote for and produced the Golden Globe Award nominated Masters of Sex and co-created the ABC series, Scoundrels, starring Virginia Madsen.

In recently, Levine and Greene executive produced and served as writers for Hulu's upcoming Ryan Murphy legal drama series, All's Fair, starring Kim Kardashian and Glenn Close which premiered on November 4, 2025.

== Acting ==
As an actor, Levine graduated from the Juilliard School, and appeared on Broadway in Dracula (starring Frank Langella), Rumors (with Ron Leibman, Jessica Walter and Christine Baranski), Gypsy (starring Tyne Daly) and The Visit (with Jane Alexander). He most recently appeared in the film The Sea of Trees (2015) directed by Gus Van Sant.

== Writing, directing and producing credtis ==
=== Film ===
- Every Day (2010) (writer & director)
- Submission (2017) (writer & director)

=== Television ===
Year	Title	Creator	Writer	Director	Executive Producer
1994	California Dreams	No	Yes	No	No
1995	The 5 Mrs. Buchanans	No	Yes	No	No
1995-1996	The Crew	No	Yes	No	No
1996	Lush Life	No	Yes	No	No
1999	Family Rules	No	Yes	No	Producer
1999-2000	Stark Raving Mad	No	Yes	No	Producer
2000	Normal Ohio	No	Yes	No	Supervising
2002	First Monday	No	Yes	No	Producer
2002	JAG	No	Yes	No	No
2003-2010	Nip/Tuck	No	Yes	Yes	Yes
2010	Scoundrels	Developer	Yes	No	Yes
2011	Boss	No	Yes	No	Yes
2013	Masters of Sex	No	Yes	No	Supervising
2018	The Truth About the Harry Quebert Affair	Yes	Yes	No	Yes
2024-2025	Doctor Odyssey	No	No	No	Yes
2025	All's Fair	No	Yes	No	Yes
