= Emerson Hart =

American musician

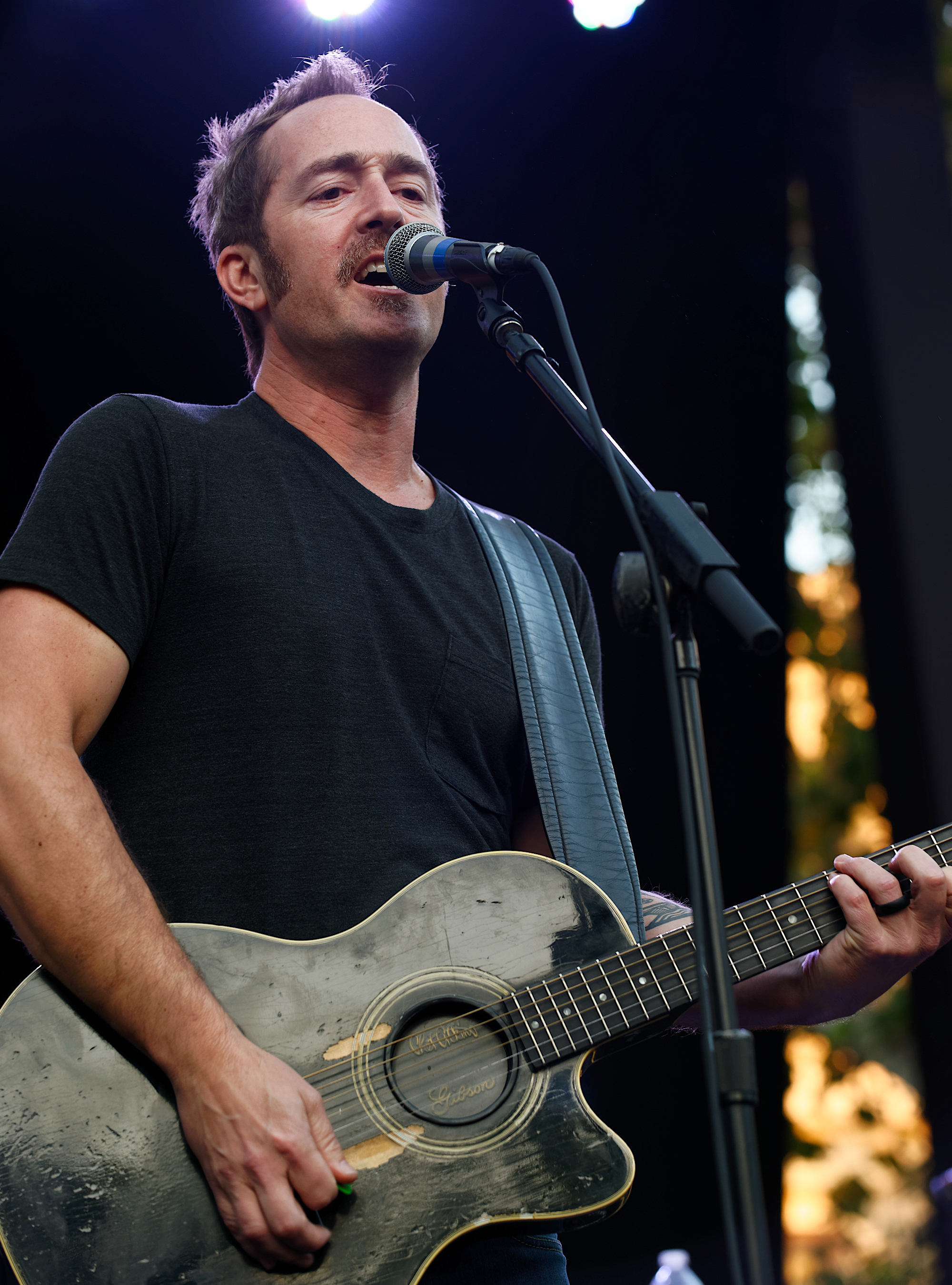
- Hart performing with Tonic in 2016

Background information
- Born: July 21, 1969 (age 56)
- Origin: Washington, Pennsylvania, U.S.
- Genres: Alternative rock
- Occupations: Singer, songwriter, producer
- Instruments: Vocals, guitar
- Years active: 1993–present
- Member of: Tonic
- Website: www.emersonhart.com

Emerson Hart (born July 21, 1969) is a songwriter, vocalist, guitarist and producer. He is the lead singer and songwriter of the alternative rock band Tonic.

== Biography ==
Hart was born in Washington, Pennsylvania. He grew up in Atlantic Highlands, New Jersey and attended Red Bank Catholic High School.

Hart's father Jennings sang for the USO and his mother Sandra is a former television hostess. His father was diagnosed with paranoid schizophrenia and was prescribed medicine to regulate his mental disorder, but he often resisted treatment, and he and Sandra divorced in 1977. Jennings may have been off his medication at the time of his disappearance on January 21, 1980. The elder Hart has not been seen since, and in an interview Emerson addresses his father and his belief that his father was murdered, which is the subject of the title track written and recorded by Emerson on 2007's Cigarettes and Gasoline.

Hart has been married twice. He was first married to Nicole Taylor Hart in 2000. They had a child, daughter Lucienne Elizabeth, in 2007, but divorced in 2008. After the divorce, Hart began dating Heather McMurray, whom he married in 2012.

=== Music career ===
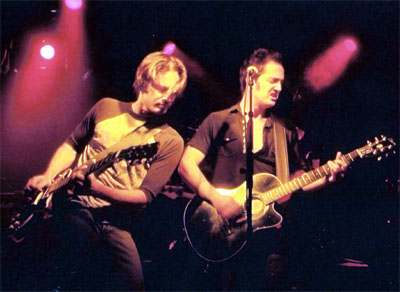
Hart (right) and bandmate Jeff Russo in 2002

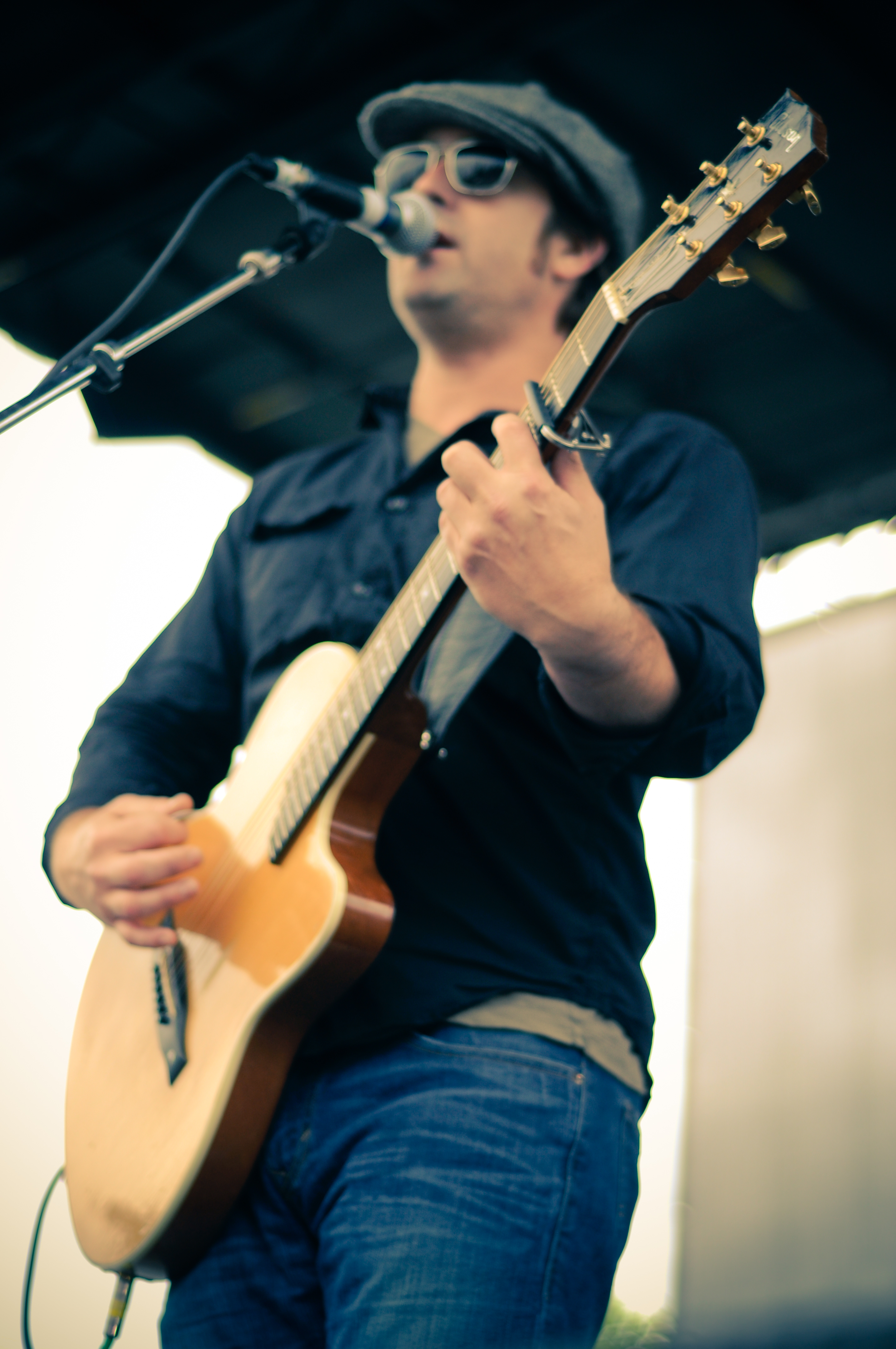
Hart in 2010

Tonic's first release, Lemon Parade, was a multi-platinum success, featuring the hit songs, "Open Up Your Eyes" and "If You Could Only See" (the former written by Hart and co-writer Jeff Russo and the latter written by Hart), the latter of which was one of the most played rock tracks of 1997. In 1999, Tonic returned with their second album and the mainstream rock hit, "You Wanted More". In 2002, Tonic released their third LP, Head on Straight. In 2003, Tonic received two Grammy nominations - one for best Rock Performance by Duo or Group with Vocal for "Take Me As I Am", and the second for Best Rock Album. Hart also co-wrote the 2005 Ingram Hill hit, "Almost Perfect", which reached the top 25 on the Hot AC chart.

Hart co-wrote the theme song, "Generation", for the NBC drama American Dreams, which premiered in 2002. He earned an ASCAP award for "Best Theme Song of Television" in 2003.

In February 2007, Hart signed a solo record deal with EMI/Manhattan Records to release his debut solo effort Cigarettes and Gasoline. It was released on July 17, 2007. Hart's first single, "If You're Gonna Leave", received airplay on American radio stations beginning in June 2007, while his second single, "I Wish the Best for You", received airplay beginning in December 2007.

Hart's second solo album, Beauty in Disrepair, (BMG) was released on April 15, 2014. The first single, titled "The Best That I Can Give", premiered on the USA Today website on January 7, 2014. Whereas his 2007 release dealt more with rocky relationships and personal struggles, Beauty takes on a more optimistic tone, with a theme of picking up the pieces and moving on.

Regarding the single "The Best That I Can Give", Hart stated: "My wife and I dated for about four years. That's a rocky road, because you have to address all the luggage that comes with the past relationships. That was the song I wrote when I almost blew it — but I didn't."

Hart's third studio album, 32 Thousand Days, was released on December 13, 2019. He released the first single from the album, "Lucky One", on November 13, 2019.

== Discography ==
=== Solo albums ===
Cigarettes and Gasoline (July 17, 2007) Manhattan Records
  1. "Run To" - 3:17
  2. "Devastation Hands" - 3:10
  3. "If You're Gonna Leave" - 3:50
  4. "I Wish the Best for You" - 3:50
  5. "I Know" - 3:29
  6. "Green Hills Race for California" - 3:58
  7. "Ordinary" - 3:08
  8. "Vanity" - 4:33
  9. "When She Loves You" - 3:30
  10. "Flyin'" - 4:03
  11. "Friend to a Stranger" - 3:29
  12. "Cigarettes And Gasoline" - 5:10

Beauty in Disrepair (April 15, 2014) BMG
  1. "The Best That I Can Give" - 4:17
  2. "Who Am I" - 2:40
  3. "Hurricane" - 4:30
  4. "To Be Young" - 4:16
  5. "Mostly Grey" - 4:03
  6. "You Know Who I Am" - 2:52
  7. "Another Life" - 3:59
  8. "Don't Forget Yourself" - 2:28
  9. "The Wire" - 3:10
  10. "Hallway" - 3:44
  11. "All is Well" - 3:13
  12. "The Lines" - 4:07

32 Thousand Days (December 13, 2019)
  1. "Lucky One" - 3:59
  2. "First To Love" - 3:13
  3. "It's True" - 3:12
  4. "She Makes It Rain" - 3:08
  5. "I Get You" - 3:01
  6. "Island" - 4:18
  7. "Lights Out" - 4:07
  8. "When I Had You" - 3:20
  9. "Amen" - 3:31
  10. "Ageless" - 2:59
  11. "Disposable" - 2:54
  12. "Old Friend" - 3:33
  13. "Kids" - 3:20
  14. "32 Thousand Days" - 4:18

=== Other appearances ===
Year	Song	Album
2018	"Engine, Engine No. 9"	King of the Road: A Tribute to Roger Miller
