= Lemon Parade =

Studio album by Tonic
- Released: July 16, 1996
- Recorded: 1995
- Studios: Ocean Way Recording (Hollywood, California); Devonshire Sound Studios (North Hollywood, California); Sound City Studios and Andora Studios (Los Angeles, California)
- Genres: Alternative rock; post-grunge
- Length: 50:55
- Label: Polydor
- Producer: Jack Joseph Puig

Tonic chronology
| Lemon Parade (1996) | Sugar (1999) |

Singles from Lemon Parade
- 1. "Open Up Your Eyes" Released: June 1996; 2. "Casual Affair" Released: January 1997; 3. "If You Could Only See" Released: February 10, 1997

Lemon Parade is the debut studio album of American rock band Tonic, released on July 16, 1996, by Polydor Records. The album has sold 1,300,000 copies to date and reached platinum status in the United States. Lemon Parade featured three singles. "If You Could Only See" was a hit single on the Billboard Mainstream Rock Tracks charts, reaching number one, and it also reached number 11 on the Billboard Airplay Hot 100, spending 63 weeks on the chart.

Based on the success of Lemon Parade, in March 1999, Tonic released a live EP with enhanced material entitled Live and Enhanced.

In 2016, Tonic released an all-acoustic version of Lemon Parade entitled Lemon Parade Revisited. This celebrated the album's 20th anniversary and utilized direct funding from fans.

== Production ==
After Emerson Hart and Jeff Russo founded the band in 1993, the additions of bass guitar player Dan Rothchild and drummer Kevin Shepard solidified the band prior to signing their record deal in 1995. Producer Jack Joseph Puig worked with Tonic to produce the resulting album, Lemon Parade. While members of the band have traditionally been hesitant to discuss the meaning behind their songs, Hart did elaborate on some of the songs from this album. For instance, on the title track "Lemon Parade", Hart explained the song came from a dream he had. "I had a dream about this girl. I was riding this big Schwinn Sting Ray, and I rode by her working in a lemonade stand. She looked ugly and sad because kids were throwing lemons at her. Then later on, I saw her after high school and was crazy about her. They couldn't see how beautiful she really was."

== Promotion and release ==
Four unique music videos were produced as part of the album's promotion, including two different versions of "Open Up Your Eyes", one of which was directed by Tonic and Niels Alpert that featured the band on roller skates and a cameo appearance by Mick Fleetwood. In terms of singles from the record, "If You Could Only See" reached number one on the Billboard Mainstream Rock Tracks, and also reached number 11 on the Billboard Airplay Hot 100, where it spent 63 weeks on the chart. Lemon Parade reached number 28 on the Billboard 200, number 12 in Australia, and number 34 on the Canadian Albums Chart. In the ensuing years the popularity of "If You Could Only See" continued with its part in the video games Karaoke Revolution Party and Band Hero.

== Reception ==
Professional ratings
Review scores
| Source | Rating |
|---|---|
| AllMusic | 2.5/5 stars |
| Melodic | 5/5 stars |

Critical response to Lemon Parade was mixed. Music critic Shawn M. Haney wrote, "The record as a whole is full of the heavy, distortion-laden Tonic sound, and guitars that make them who they are. Although the recordings are murky at times, like shoes splashing through muddy puddles of water, the record's highlights—such as the uplifting acoustic track 'Mountain' and the rawness of 'Wicked Soldier'—are still full of rich musical creativity."

== Track listing ==
All songs by Emerson Hart except where noted.

1. "Open Up Your Eyes" − 3:40
2. "Casual Affair" (Tonic) − 3:43
3. "If You Could Only See" − 4:21
4. "Soldier's Daughter" − 5:03
5. "Lemon Parade" (Hart, Jeff Russo) − 3:42
6. "Mountain" − 4:38
7. "Thick" − 4:21
8. "Wicked Soldier" (Tonic) − 4:31
9. "Mr. Golden Deal" − 4:55
10. "Bigot Sunshine" − 2:53
11. "Celtic Aggression" (Hart, Dan Rothchild, Russo) − 3:26
12. "My Old Man" − 5:52

== Personnel ==
Tonic

- Emerson Hart – vocals, rhythm guitars, slide guitar, percussion
- Jeff Russo – lead guitars, rhythm guitars, slide guitar, percussion, drums (12), backing vocals
- Dan Rothchild – slide guitar, bass guitar, backing vocals
- Kevin Shepard – drums (1–11), backing vocals

Additional personnel

- Lenny Castro – percussion (2–4, 9, 11, 12)

Production

- Tom Storms – A&R
- Jack Joseph Puig – producer, recording, mixing
- Bob Ludwig – mastering at Gateway Mastering (Portland, Maine)
- Jeri Heiden – art direction
- Jean Kirkorian – design
- Malcolm Tarlofsky – spiral man illustration
- Jonathon Rosen – spot illustration
- Danny Clinch – band photography
- Holly Lindem – cigar photography
- Sheila Scott – management

== Charts ==
=== Weekly charts ===
| Chart (1997–1998) | Peak position |
|---|---|
| Australian Albums (ARIA) | 12 |
| Canadian Albums (RPM) | 34 |
| US Billboard 200 | 28 |

=== Year-end charts ===
| Chart (1997) | Position |
|---|---|
| US Billboard 200 | 87 |
| Chart (1998) | Position |
| Australian Albums (ARIA) | 50 |

== Certifications ==
| Region | Certification | Certified units/sales |
|---|---|---|
| Australia (ARIA) | Platinum | 70,000^{^} |
| Canada (Music Canada) | Platinum | 100,000^{^} |
| United States (RIAA) | Platinum | 1,300,000 |
^{^} Shipments figures based on certification alone.
