= If You Could Only See =

1997 single by Tonic

Single by Tonic

from the album Lemon Parade
- Released: February 10, 1997
- Studio: Sound City (Los Angeles)
- Genre: Post-grunge
- Length: 4:21 (album version); 4:07 (single version)
- Label: Polydor
- Songwriter: Emerson Hart
- Producer: Jack Joseph Puig

Tonic singles chronology
"Casual Affair" (1997)	"If You Could Only See" (1997)	"You Wanted More" (1999)

Music video
- "If You Could Only See" on YouTube

"If You Could Only See" is a song by American rock band Tonic from their debut studio album, Lemon Parade (1996). It was released to radio as the third and final single from the album on February 10, 1997, by Polydor Records. Frontman Emerson Hart is the sole writer of the song, while production on the song was helmed by Jack Joseph Puig. According to Hart, the song was written as a result of his family disowning him due to their disapproval of Hart's relationship with an older woman. The song is Tonic's most successful, becoming a hit in several countries, and has been described as "rock radio's most played song of 1997."

== Background and writing ==
In an interview on Live at the Chapel, an Australian television program, Tonic lead vocalist Emerson Hart elucidated the meaning of "If You Could Only See". He stated that he had been in a relationship with an older woman and that his family did not approve of that relationship, and this song was written about that situation and was directed at his family.

In another interview, Hart said, "When I was 21 or 22, I was in love with somebody who my mom did not feel was a good fit. So my family disowned me for about three years. And the last conversation I had with my mother when I was home I’d said, 'if you could only see the way she loves me, maybe you would understand.' I just wrote that song, after that phone call, literally in a matter of minutes."

== Recording and mixing ==
The recording sessions for "If You Could Only See" took place in Los Angeles and Hollywood, California at Sound City Studios and Devonshire Sound Studios, respectively. Production on the song was helmed by Jack Joseph Puig, with Puig also acting as a recording engineer. The song was recorded on a Neve Custom 8020 mixing console, using a Studer A80 tape recorder. Puig was also responsible for the mixing of the track, which was made at Andora Studios in Hollywood, California. Puig mixed the song on a Neve 8078 mixing console, using a Studer A800 tape recorder. Bob Ludwig mastered the track at Gateway Mastering in Portland, using an Ampex 499 as the master tape. WEA was responsible for the manufacturing of the single on both compact disc and cassette tape.

== Critical reception ==
Shawn M. Haney of AllMusic referred to the song as "light and romantic," praising the song's texture and its slide guitars.

== Chart performance ==
"If You Could Only See" was a number-one hit on the US Billboard Mainstream Rock Tracks chart, spending five weeks at the top and ending the year as the chart's most successful song. It also reached number 11 on the Billboard Hot 100 Airplay chart, on which it spent 63 weeks. In Canada, the song peaked at number 18 on the RPM 100 Hit Tracks chart and topped the Alternative 30 chart, ranking number 42 on the RPM year-end chart for 1997. In Australia, the song peaked at number 20 and spent 26 weeks in the top 50. As a result of its longevity on the Australian chart, it ended 1997 as the nation's 88th-highest-selling single and earned a gold certification for shipments exceeding 35,000 copies.

== Music video ==
The music video was directed by Jeff Cutter and Ramaa Mosley.

== Track listings ==
- European CD single
1. "If You Could Only See" (LP version) – 4:21
2. "Open Up Your Eyes" (live at Melkweg, Amsterdam) – 7:04
- United Kingdom 7-inch vinyl
1. "If You Could Only See" (edit) – 4:07
2. "If You Could Only See" (acoustic version) – 4:17
- Australian and German CD single
1. "If You Could Only See" (LP version) – 4:21
2. "Open Up Your Eyes" (live at Melkweg, Amsterdam) – 7:04
3. "Thick" (live at Melkweg, Amsterdam) – 4:53
4. "Casual Affair" (live at Melkweg, Amsterdam) – 4:05
- Digital download
1. "If You Could Only See" (25th Anniversary) – 4:26

== Credits and personnel ==
Credits and personnel are adapted from the Lemon Parade album liner notes.

- Emerson Hart – writing, vocals, rhythm guitar, slide, percussion
- Jeff Russo – lead guitar, rhythm guitar, backing vocals, slide, percussion
- Dan Rothchild – bass, backing vocals, slide
- Kevin Shepard – drums, backing vocals
- Lenny Castro – percussion
- Jack Joseph Puig – production, recording and mixing at Sound City (Los Angeles) and Devonshire Studios (Hollywood)
- Bob Ludwig – mastering at Gateway Mastering (Portland)

== Charts ==
=== Weekly charts ===
Chart (1997)	Peak position
Australia (ARIA)	20
Canada Top Singles (RPM)	18
Canada Rock/Alternative (RPM)	1
Netherlands (Single Top 100)	100
US Radio Songs (Billboard)	11
US Adult Alternative Airplay (Billboard)	10
US Adult Pop Airplay (Billboard)	7
US Alternative Airplay (Billboard)	3
US Mainstream Rock Airplay (Billboard)	1
US Pop Airplay (Billboard)	11

=== Year-end charts ===
Chart (1997)	Position
Australia (ARIA)	88
Canada Top Singles (RPM)	42
Canada Rock/Alternative (RPM)	20
US Hot 100 Airplay (Billboard)	37
US Adult Top 40 (Billboard)	25
US Mainstream Rock Tracks (Billboard)	1
US Modern Rock Tracks (Billboard)	7
US Top 40/Mainstream (Billboard)	44
US Triple-A (Billboard)	25

Chart (1998)	Position
US Hot 100 Airplay (Billboard)	30
US Adult Top 40 (Billboard)	17
US Mainstream Top 40 (Billboard)	56

== Certifications ==
Region	Certification	Certified units/sales
Australia (ARIA)	Gold	35,000^{^}
^{^} Shipments figures based on certification alone.

== Release history ==
Region	Date	Format(s)	Label(s)	Ref.
United States	February 10, 1997	Alternative radio	Polydor	
United States	March 18, 1997	Contemporary hit radio	Polydor	
United Kingdom	September 15, 1997	7-inch vinyl; CD	Polydor	
