= Joël Dicker =

Swiss novelist

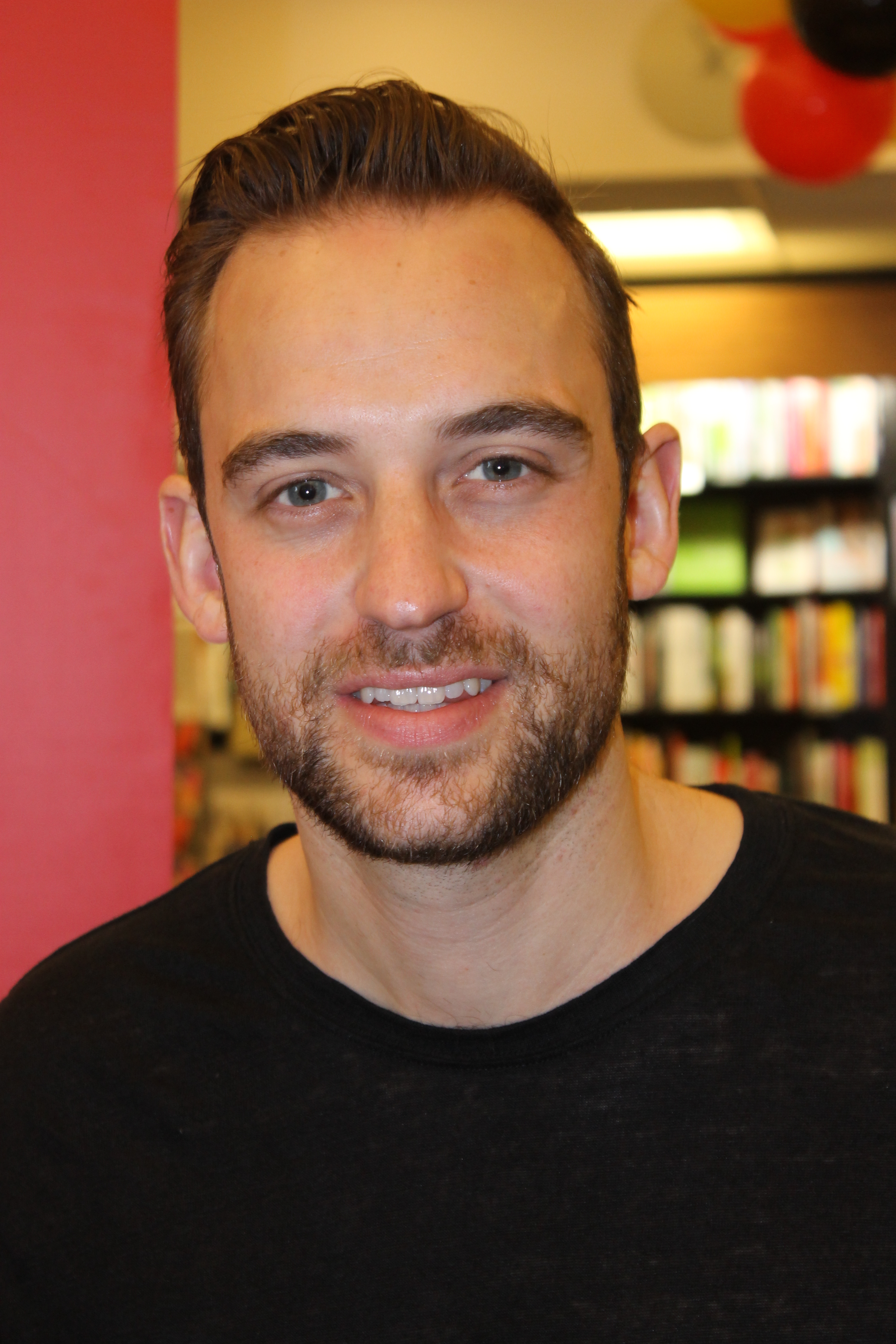
- Born: 16 June 1985 (age 41); Geneva, Switzerland
- Occupation: Novelist
- Writing career
- Genre: Thriller
- Notable work: La Vérité sur l’Affaire Harry Quebert
- Notable awards: Prix Goncourt des Lycéens Grand Prix du Roman de l’Academie Francaise
- Website: www.joeldicker.com

Joël Dicker (born 16 June 1985) is a Swiss novelist.

== Early life ==
Joel Dicker was born into a Jewish family. Dicker attended College Madame de Staël in Geneva. At the age of 19, he enrolled at the Cours Florent in Paris. After one year, he returned to Switzerland to attend law school, where he received his Master of Laws from the University of Geneva in 2010.

== Career ==
In 2010, after Dicker had won the Prix des écrivains genevois (Geneva Writers' Prize), a prize for unpublished manuscripts, Parisian editor Bernard de Fallois acquired Dicker's debut novel Les derniers jours de nos pères (The Final Days of Our Fathers). The book was published the same year.

In September 2012, de Fallois published Dicker's La Vérité sur l’Affaire Harry Quebert (The Truth About the Harry Quebert Affair). The book was translated into 32 languages and won several prizes, e.g., the Grand Prix du Roman de L'Académie Française and the prix Goncourt des lycéens in 2012.

Dicker's third novel, Le Livre des Baltimore, was released on 26 September 2015.

Dicker's fourth novel, La disparition de Stephanie Mailer, was released in March 2018.

In March 2021, he announced a video on Twitter that he was leaving the Fallois publishing house on 1 January 2022 to create his own publishing house. The small Fallois publishing house ceased its activity following this departure, in accordance with the wishes of its founder, who had died three years earlier.

In December 2023, he announced the publication of his latest thriller, A Wild Animal, released on 27 February 2024.

== Bibliography ==
=== Novels ===
- Les derniers jours de nos pères [The Final Days of our Fathers] (2010)
- The Truth About the Harry Quebert Affair (2012) translated by Sam Taylor
- The Baltimore Boys (2015) translated by Alison Anderson
- The Disappearance of Stephanie Mailer (2018) translated by Howard Curtis
- The Enigma of Room 622 (2020) translated by Robert Bonnono
- The Alaska Sanders Affair (2022) translated by Robert Bonnono
- A Wild Animal (2024)
- La Très Catastrophique Visite du zoo [The Very Catastrophic Visit to the Zoo] (2025)

=== Short stories ===
- Le Tigre [The Tiger] (2005)
