= Dan Lavery =

American professional musician (born 1966)

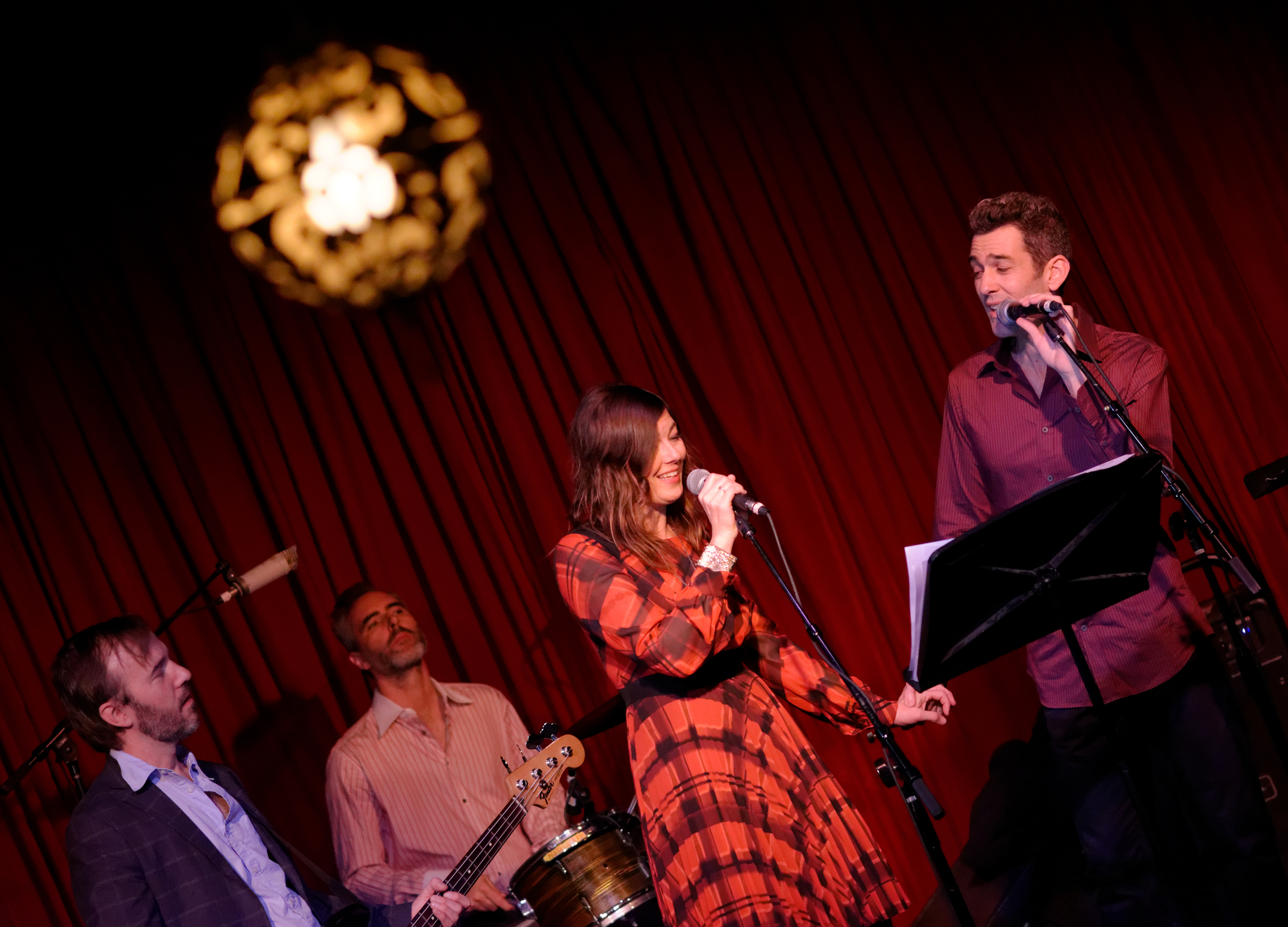
- Lavery (r)

Background information
- Born: June 11, 1966 (age 58)
- Genres: Rock
- Occupation(s): Songwriter, musician
- Instrument: Bass guitar
- Years active: 1997–present
- Website: danlavery.com

Dan Lavery (born June 11, 1966) is an American professional musician, who has been nominated for two Grammy Awards as part of the band Tonic. Lavery joined Tonic after the band had recorded Lemon Parade, and has been a part of Tonic ever since. When Tonic went on hiatus in the 2004, Lavery embarked on songwriting for motion pictures, such as work inspired by the film The Passion of the Christ. Lavery also began playing bass guitar for musical group The Fray in 2007. Lavery is currently working with his fellow Tonic band members on a studio recording scheduled to be released in 2010.

Lavery grew up in Lawrence Township, Mercer County, New Jersey and graduated from Lawrence High School in Lawrenceville, New Jersey and the Rutgers University School of Engineering in 1990. During his time in college, he played in a band named "True." Lavery and his fellow members of True (minus bass player Dave Nitti) traveled to Los Angeles to try to become professional musicians. They were discovered by Paul A. Rothchild, who had managed musical acts such as The Doors. The band True was short-lived though, breaking up. Paul Rothchild's son Dan happened to be the original bass player in Tonic. Dan Rothchild left Tonic in 1996, and Emerson Hart subsequently asked Lavery to join Tonic.
