= List of Sherlock Holmes episodes =

List on projects Wikimedia

Sherlock Holmes was a series of adaptations of Arthur Conan Doyle's Sherlock Holmes stories. It was produced by Granada Television and originally broadcast by ITV in the United Kingdom in 1984–1994. The series starred Jeremy Brett as Holmes and David Burke (in the Adventures series) and later, Edward Hardwicke, as Dr. Watson. The program was made up of 36 fifty minute standard length episodes (airing in a one-hour timeslot), and five feature-length specials.

Series	Episodes	Originally released	
Series	Episodes	First released	Last released
The Adventures of Sherlock Holmes	13	24 April 1984	29 September 1985
The Return of Sherlock Holmes	13	9 July 1986	31 August 1988
The Case-Book of Sherlock Holmes	9	21 February 1991	3 February 1993
The Memoirs of Sherlock Holmes	6	7 March 1994	11 April 1994

== Episodes ==
=== The Adventures of Sherlock Holmes ===
No.	Title	Based on	Original release date
1	"A Scandal in Bohemia"	"A Scandal in Bohemia"	24 April 1984
The King of Bohemia asks Holmes to retrieve a compromising photograph from actress and singer Irene Adler, who proves to be a worthy opponent. Features Gayle Hunnicutt as Irene Adler and Wolf Kahler as the King of Bohemia.
2	"The Dancing Men"	"The Adventure of the Dancing Men"	1 May 1984
Hilton Cubitt employs Holmes when drawings of dancing stick figures appear and terrify his American wife. Features Tenniel Evans as Hilton Cubitt, Betsy Brantley as Elsie Cubitt and Eugene Lipinski as Abe Slaney.
3	"The Naval Treaty"	"The Adventure of the Naval Treaty"	8 May 1984
Holmes must find a naval treaty which was stolen from a Foreign Office clerk and prevent an international scandal. Features David Gwillim as Percy Phelps, Gareth Thomas as Joseph Harrison, Alison Skilbeck as Annie Harrison and Ronald Russell as Lord Holdhurst.
4	"The Solitary Cyclist"	"The Adventure of the Solitary Cyclist"	15 May 1984
Violet Smith, a young music teacher, contacts Holmes when she is followed by a mysterious cyclist; Holmes connects this with her employer's marriage proposal. Features John Castle as Carruthers, Michael Siberry as Woodley, Barbara Wilshere as Violet Smith and Ellis Dale as Williamson.
5	"The Crooked Man"	"The Adventure of the Crooked Man"	22 May 1984
A missing key helps Holmes prove Colonel Barclay's wife innocent after he is found dead. Features Lisa Daniely as Nancy Barclay, Norman Jones as Henry Wood, Denys Hawthorne as James Barclay, Fiona Shaw as Miss Morrison and Paul Chapman as Major Murphy.
6	"The Speckled Band"	"The Adventure of the Speckled Band"	29 May 1984
Helen Stoner seeks help from Holmes when her stepfather moves her into the room where her sister mysteriously died. Features Jeremy Kemp as Dr Grimesby Roylott, Rosalyn Landor as Helen Stoner, Denise Armon as Julia Stoner and Stephen Mallatratt as Percy Armitage.
7	"The Blue Carbuncle"	"The Adventure of the Blue Carbuncle"	5 June 1984
Holmes and Watson undertake a Christmas investigation when a unique blue carbuncle ends up in a goose's gullet. Features Rosalind Knight as the Countess of Morcar, Ken Campbell as James Ryder, Ros Simmons as Catherine Cusack, Frank Middlemass as Henry Baker, Frank Mills as Peterson and Desmond McNamara as John Horner.
8	"The Copper Beeches"	"The Adventure of the Copper Beeches"	25 August 1985
Violet Hunter contacts Holmes about her employer's strange requests for her to cut her hair and wear a particular dress. Features Joss Ackland as Jephro Rucastle, Natasha Richardson as Violet Hunter, Patience Collier as Miss Stoper and Angela Browne as Mrs Toller.
9	"The Greek Interpreter"	"The Adventure of the Greek Interpreter"	1 September 1985
Holmes, Watson and Holmes's brother Mycroft learn of a Greek interpreter who was kidnapped and forced to communicate with an abductee. Features Charles Gray as Mycroft Holmes, Alkis Kritikos as Mr Melas, George Costigan as Wilson Kemp, Nicholas Field as Harold Latimer, Anton Alexander as Paul Kratides and Victoria Harwood as Sophy Kratides.
10	"The Norwood Builder"	"The Adventure of the Norwood Builder"	8 September 1985
A solicitor who was asked by a man he had never met to draw up a will leaving the man's fortune to himself consults Holmes after he's been accused of murdering the man. Features Colin Jeavons as Inspector Lestrade, Matthew Solon as John Hector McFarlane, Jonathan Adams as Jonas Oldacre, Rosalie Crutchley as Mrs Lexington and Helen Ryan as Mrs McFarlane.
11	"The Resident Patient"	"The Adventure of the Resident Patient"	15 September 1985
A doctor asks Holmes about the strange behavior of the man who set him up with a prestigious practice in return for a percentage of his income. Features Nicholas Clay as Dr Percy Trevelyan, Patrick Newell as Mr Blessington and John Ringham as Inspector Lanner.
12	"The Red-Headed League"	"The Red-Headed League"	22 September 1985
A red-headed man consults Holmes when his employers, who paid him to copy out an encyclopedia, mysteriously vanish, and their true goal is soon uncovered. Features Roger Hammond as Jabez Wilson, Richard Wilson as Duncan Ross, Tim McInnerny as John Clay, John Woodnutt as Mr Merryweather and John Labanowski as Athelney Jones.
13	"The Final Problem"	"The Final Problem"	29 September 1985
After foiling Moriarty's plan to steal the Mona Lisa, Holmes survives several attempts on his life from Moriarty's agents; the two face each other for the last time at Reichenbach Falls. Features Eric Porter as Professor Moriarty, Olivier Pierre as Director of the Louvre, Claude Le Saché as Minister of the Interior, Robert Henderson as the American Millionaire ("Mr Morgan") and Paul Humpoletz as Herr Steiler. (Last appearance of David Burke as Dr. Watson)

=== The Return of Sherlock Holmes ===
No.	Title	Based on	Original release date
14	"The Empty House"	"The Adventure of the Empty House"	9 July 1986
Holmes returns to England, to Watson's shocked surprise, and must stop a member of Moriarty's gang who is trying to assassinate him. Features Patrick Allen as Colonel Sebastian Moran and James Bree as the Coroner. (First appearance of Edward Hardwicke as Dr. Watson)
15	"The Priory School"	"The Adventure of the Priory School"	16 July 1986
A rich duke reluctantly allows Holmes to search for his ten-year-old son who is missing from his boarding school along with the German tutor. Features Alan Howard as the Duke of Holdernesse and Christopher Benjamin as Dr Huxtable. (This is actually the sixth episode of the series and Abbey Grange is the second.)
16	"The Second Stain"	"The Adventure of the Second Stain"	23 July 1986
The Prime Minister asks Holmes to help recover a stolen letter which could lead to war if made public. Features Patricia Hodge as Lady Hilda Trelawney Hope, Stuart Wilson as The Right Honourable Trelawney Hope and Harry Andrews as Lord Bellinger, the Prime Minister.
17	"The Musgrave Ritual"	"The Adventure of the Musgrave Ritual"	30 July 1986
While vacationing at the estate of his old university classmate, Sir Reginald Musgrave, Holmes investigates when the scholarly butler disappears after being discovered reading an old document about a mysterious family ritual. Features James Hazeldine as Richard Brunton and Michael Culver as Sir Reginald Musgrave.
18	"The Abbey Grange"	"The Adventure of the Abbey Grange"	6 August 1986
Lord Brackenstall has been murdered and his battered wife says that a thief and his sons were the culprits: wine glasses convince Holmes otherwise. Features Paul Williamson as Inspector Hopkins, Anne-Louise Lambert as Lady Mary Brackenstall and Oliver Tobias as Captain Croker.
19	"The Man with the Twisted Lip"	"The Man with the Twisted Lip"	13 August 1986
Watson finds Holmes in an opium den, where he has been sent to look for Neville St Clair, who is suspected to have been killed by a beggar. Features Denis Lill as Inspector Bradstreet, Clive Francis as Neville St Clair and Eleanor David as Mrs St Clair.
20	"The Six Napoleons"	"The Adventure of the Six Napoleons"	20 August 1986
Holmes is contacted by Inspector Lestrade after the police are baffled by a series of burglaries serving only to steal and smash identical busts of Napoleon. Features Eric Sykes as Horace Harker, Colin Jeavons as Inspector Lestrade and Vernon Dobtcheff as Mendelstam.
21	"The Sign of Four" (Note: Feature-length special.)	The Sign of the Four	29 December 1987
Mary Morstan has received a pearl in the post every year since her father's disappearance; this leads Holmes and Watson to the truth about a secret pact among four convicts during the Indian Mutiny of 1857. Features Jenny Seagrove as Mary Morstan, Ronald Lacey as Thaddeus and Bartholomew Sholto, Emrys James as Inspector Athelney Jones and John Thaw as Jonathan Small.
22	"The Devil's Foot"	"The Adventure of the Devil's Foot"	6 April 1988
In Cornwall, Holmes investigates when a woman mysteriously dies with a horrified look on her face and her two brothers are driven insane. Features Denis Quilley as Dr Leon Sterndale, Damien Thomas as Mortimer Tregennis and Michael Aitkens as Reverend Roundhay.
23	"Silver Blaze"	"The Adventure of Silver Blaze"	13 April 1988
Holmes investigates when a prized racehorse goes missing and its trainer is found bludgeoned to death. Features Peter Barkworth as Colonel Ross and Malcolm Storry as Inspector Gregory.
24	"Wisteria Lodge"	"The Adventure of Wisteria Lodge"	20 April 1988
An amateur cartographer who stayed with another map enthusiast seeks help when his host vanishes in the middle of the night. Features Freddie Jones as Inspector Baynes, Kika Markham as Miss Burnet, Donald Churchill as Scott Eccles and Basil Hoskins as Henderson.
25	"The Bruce-Partington Plans"	"The Adventure of the Bruce-Partington Plans"	27 April 1988
Holmes helps Mycroft when stolen top secret blueprints for a submarine are found on the body of a civil servant found dead on the tracks of the Underground. Features Charles Gray as Mycroft Holmes, Denis Lill as Inspector Bradstreet, Jonathan Newth as Colonel Valentine Walter and Geoffrey Bayldon as Sidney Johnson
26	"The Hound of the Baskervilles"	The Hound of the Baskervilles	31 August 1988
Sir Charles Baskerville was found dead with a horrible expression on his face apparently after seeing the mysterious demonic spirit of a gigantic hound that has haunted his family. Dr Mortimer visits Sherlock Holmes to save Sir Henry, the heir of the Baskerville estate, and to solve the mystery of the curse before it's too late. Features Kristoffer Tabori as Sir Henry Baskerville, Alastair Duncan as Dr Mortimer, Ronald Pickup as Barrymore, James Faulkner as Stapleton and Fiona Gillies as Beryl Stapleton.

=== The Case-Book of Sherlock Holmes ===
No.	Title	Based on	Original release date
27	"The Disappearance of Lady Frances Carfax"	"The Disappearance of Lady Frances Carfax"	21 February 1991
Holmes must save a fiercely independent woman after Watson meets her and observes she is troubled by a mysterious bearded man. Features Cheryl Campbell as Lady Frances Carfax, Julian Curry as Major Shlessinger, Jack Klaff as the Honourable Philip Green and Michael Jayston as the Earl of Rufton.
28	"The Problem of Thor Bridge"	"The Problem of Thor Bridge"	28 February 1991
When a governess is arrested for shooting and killing Maria Gibson, the dead woman's rich husband needs Holmes's help to prove her innocent. Features Daniel Massey as Neil Gibson, Celia Gregory as Maria Gibson, Catherine Russell as Grace Dunbar and Niven Boyd as Marlow Bates.
29	"Shoscombe Old Place"	"The Adventure of Shoscombe Old Place"	7 March 1991
The horse trainer of a debt-ridden aristocrat consults Holmes about his employer's behaviour. Features Robin Ellis as Sir Robert Norberton, Frank Grimes as John Mason, Elizabeth Weaver as Lady Beatrice Falder, Jude Law as Joe Barnes, Denise Black as Carrie Evans and Michael Bilton as Stephens.
30	"The Boscombe Valley Mystery"	"The Boscombe Valley Mystery"	14 March 1991
Holmes must help James McCarthy when his father is killed after an argument (the subject of which he will not reveal) and young McCarthy is accused of the crime. Features Peter Vaughan as John Turner, Jonathan Barlow as Inspector Summerby, Joanna Roth as Alice Turner, James Purefoy as James McCarthy and Leslie Schofield as William McCarthy.
31	"The Illustrious Client"	"The Adventure of the Illustrious Client"	21 March 1991
Sir James Damery asks Holmes to stop a general's daughter from marrying a philandering but seductively attractive murderer. Features Anthony Valentine as Baron Gruner, David Langton as Sir James Damery, Abigail Cruttenden as Miss Violet Mervllle, Kim Thomson as Kitty Winter and Roy Holder as Shinwell Johnson.
32	"The Creeping Man"	"The Adventure of the Creeping Man"	28 March 1991
The daughter of scientist Professor Presbury sees someone's face at her second-storey bedroom window; Holmes connects this with recent thefts from zoos. Features Charles Kay as Professor Presbury, Adrian Lukis as Jack Bennett, Sarah Woodward as Edith Presbury, Anna Mazzotti as Alice Morphy, Colin Jeavons as Inspector Lestrade and Peter Guinness as Harry Wilcox.
33	"The Master Blackmailer"	"The Adventure of Charles Augustus Milverton"	2 January 1992
Holmes and Watson attempt to thwart the schemes of the infamous blackmailer Charles Augustus Milverton to blackmail Lady Eva Blackwell. But things are not as easy as they at first appear and Holmes must sacrifice his morality and his honourable career to stop Milverton from wrecking her marriage. Features Robert Hardy as Charles Augustus Milverton, Norma West as Lady Diana Swinstead, Gwen Ffrangcon-Davies as the Dowager, Colin Jeavons as Inspector Lestrade, Serena Gordon as Lady Eva Blackwell, Nickolas Grace as Bertrand, Hans Meyer as Hebworth/Veitch and Sophie Thompson as Agatha.
34	"The Last Vampyre"	"The Adventure of the Sussex Vampire"	27 January 1993
Sherlock Holmes is called upon to investigate a series of deaths which seem to be related to John Stockton, who is descended from a family rumoured to have been vampires. Features Roy Marsden as John Stockton, Keith Barron as Rob Ferguson, Yolanda Vázquez as Carlotta, Maurice Denham as The Reverend Merridew, Richard Dempsey as Jack, Juliet Aubrey as Dolores, Elizabeth Spriggs as Mrs Mason, Hilary Mason as Miss Ruddock and Freddie Jones as Pedlar.
35	"The Eligible Bachelor"	"The Adventure of the Noble Bachelor" and "The Adventure of the Veiled Lodger"	3 February 1993
Holmes suffers from disturbing dreams as he helps to find the missing wife of Lord Robert St Simon. Features Geoffrey Beevers as Inspector Montgomery, Simon Williams as Lord Robert St Simon, Paris Jefferson as Henrietta Doran, Anna Calder-Marshall as Agnes Northcote/Lady Helena, Joanna McCallum as Flora Miller, Mary Ellis as Lady Florence, Phillada Sewell as Lady Mary, Elspeth March as Lady Blanche, Heather Chasen as the Honourable Amelia St Simon and Peter Warnock as Frances Hay Moulton.

=== The Memoirs of Sherlock Holmes ===
No.	Title	Based on	Original release date
36	"The Three Gables"	"The Adventure of the Three Gables"	7 March 1994
After her grandson's death, an old woman consults Holmes, after refusing a strange offer to buy her house including all its contents. Features Claudine Auger as Isadora Klein, Mary Ellis as Mary Maberley, Gary Cady as Douglas Maberley, Benjamin Pullen as James, Duke of Lomond, Caroline Blakiston as the Dowager Duchess, Peter Wyngarde as Langdale Pike, Michael Graham as Miguel Haines-Johnson, Steve Toussaint as Steve Dixie and Barbara Young as Susan.
37	"The Dying Detective"	"The Adventure of the Dying Detective"	14 March 1994
When Victor Savage begins using opium and behaving strangely, his wife consults Holmes. Victor dies, and Holmes suspects his cousin, knowledgeable in rare diseases. Features Jonathan Hyde as Culverton Smith, Susannah Harker as Adelaide Savage, Richard Bonneville as Victor Savage and Roy Hudd as John Gedgrave.
38	"The Golden Pince-Nez"	"The Adventure of the Golden Pince-Nez"	21 March 1994
Holmes and Mycroft investigate the murder of a professor's assistant who died clutching a woman's pince-nez. Features Charles Gray as Mycroft Holmes, Frank Finlay as Professor Coran/Sergius, Anna Carteret as Anna, Patricia Kerrigan as Abigail Crosby, Nigel Planer as Inspector Hopkins, Natalie Morse as Susan Tarlton, Christopher Guard as Willoughby Smith and Kathleen Byron as Mrs Marker. Watson does not appear in this episode.
39	"The Red Circle"	"The Adventure of the Red Circle"	28 March 1994
Mrs Hudson asks Holmes to help her friend with a lodger who insists on nobody entering his room. Features Betty Marsden as Mrs Warren, Kenneth Connor as Mr. Warren, John Hallam as Black Giuseppe Gorgiano, James Coombes as Gennaro Lucca, Sophia Diaz as Emilia Lucca, Tom Chadbon as Inspector Hawkins, Kerry Shale as Leverton and Joseph Long as Enrico Firmani.
40	"The Mazarin Stone"	"The Adventure of the Mazarin Stone" and "The Adventure of the Three Garridebs"	4 April 1994
While Holmes revisits an old case in the Scottish Highlands, Mycroft investigates the theft of the Mazarin Stone from a museum, and Watson deals with the promise of a large inheritance if a third person with the surname of Garrideb can be found. Features Charles Gray as Mycroft Holmes, Phyllis Calvert as Agnes Garrideb, Barbara Hicks as Emily Garrideb, Jon Finch as Count Negretto Sylvius, James Villiers as Lord Cantlemere, Denis Lill as Inspector Bradstreet, Gavan O'Herlihy as John Garrideb/James Winter, Helen Ryan as the Princess of Wales, Richard Caldicot as Nathan Garrideb and Harry Landis as Ikey Sanders.
41	"The Cardboard Box"	"The Adventure of the Cardboard Box"	11 April 1994
When Susan Cushing is sent two severed ears, Holmes connects the case with her missing sister. Features Ciarán Hinds as Jim Browner, Joanna David as Susan Cushing, Deborah Findlay as Sarah Cushing, Lucy Whybrow as Mary Browner and Tom Chadbon as Inspector Hawkins, Thierry Harcourt as Marcel Jacottet and Renny Krupinski as Murdoch Gull.
