= Sherlock Holmes (1965 TV series) =

- Peter Cushing and Nigel Stock as Holmes and Watson in A Study in Scarlet
- Starring: Douglas Wilmer (1964–65); Peter Cushing (1968); Nigel Stock
- Composers: Max Harris (1965); Alan Fogg (1968)
- No. of series: 2
- No. of episodes: 29 Episode list

Production
- Producers: David Goddard (1964–65); William Sterling (1968)
- Running time: 50 minutes

Original release
- Network: BBC1
- Release: 1965 – 1968

Sherlock Holmes and Sir Arthur Conan Doyle's Sherlock Holmes (a.k.a. The Cases of Sherlock Holmes) are two British series of Sherlock Holmes adaptations for television produced by the BBC in 1965 and 1968 respectively. The 1965 production, which followed a pilot the year before, was the second BBC series of Sherlock Holmes adaptations, after one starring Alan Wheatley in 1951. The role of Holmes was played by Douglas Wilmer in 1965, and Peter Cushing in 1968. Nigel Stock starred in both series as Dr. Watson.

== Plot ==
Set in the Victorian era (1837-1901), Sherlock Holmes is a brilliant consultant detective, as well as a private detective. He is consulted by the police and by other private detectives to aid them in solving crimes. He also takes private cases himself, and his clients range from paupers to kings. His deductive abilities and encyclopedic knowledge help him solve the most complex cases. He is assisted in his work by the military veteran, Dr. John Watson, with whom he shares a flat at 221B Baker Street.

== Cast ==
- Douglas Wilmer - Sherlock Holmes (1964–1965)
- Peter Cushing - Sherlock Holmes (1968)
- Nigel Stock - Doctor Watson (1964–1968)

=== Recurring ===
- Mary Holder (1964)/Enid Lindsey (1965, 3 episodes) - Mrs. Hudson
- Grace Arnold - Mrs. Hudson (1968, 8 episodes)
- Peter Madden - Inspector Lestrade (1965, 6 episodes) (Madden would also portray Bill McCarthy in the 1968 series adaptation of "The Boscombe Valley Mystery" and Von Tirpitz in The Private Life of Sherlock Holmes in 1970)
- William Lucas - Inspector Lestrade (1968, 2 episodes)
- George A. Cooper - Inspector Gregson (1968, 2 episodes)

=== Guest stars ===
- David Burke - Sir George Burnwell in "The Beryl Coronet" (portrayed Dr Watson in the first two series of Granada's 1980's series Sherlock Holmes)
- Edward Hardwicke - Davenport in "The Greek Interpreter" (portrayed Dr Watson in the remaining series of the Granada series, after Burke left the role.)
- Frank Middlemass - Peterson in "The Blue Carbuncle" (portrayed Henry Baker in the 1984 Granada adaptation of the same story, and Dr Froelich in Sherlock Holmes and the Leading Lady)
- Ballard Berkeley — portrayed two roles in the series opposite the two Holmes actors: Sir James Damery in "The Illustrious Client" (1965) and Sir Charles Baskerville in "The Hound of the Baskervilles" (1968).

== Production ==
=== Development ===
In 1964, the BBC secured rights to adapt any five Sherlock Holmes stories with an option for a further eight from the Doyle estate. A handful of Doyle's stories were excluded from the deal: The Hound of the Baskervilles because Hammer Films' rights would not expire until 1965 following their 1959 film adaptation, and "A Scandal in Bohemia", "The Final Problem" and "The Adventure of the Empty House" which had been secured by producers of the Broadway musical Baker Street.

In 1964, an adaptation of "The Adventure of the Speckled Band" was commissioned as a pilot for a twelve part series of Sherlock Holmes stories. Giles Cooper wrote the adaptation and Douglas Wilmer was cast as Holmes and Nigel Stock as Watson, with Felix Felton as Dr. Grimesby Roylott.

The hour-long pilot was aired as an episode of the BBC anthology series Detective on 18 May and was popular enough to re-air on 25 September this time under the banner of Encore which was a BBC2 repeat slot.

Wilmer and Stock were secured for a twelve part series (in black-and-white) to air the following year. Wilmer was a lifelong fan of Doyle's stories and looked forward to portraying the legendary sleuth.

The part interested me very much because I’d never really, I felt, seen it performed to its full capacity. There’s a very dark side to Holmes, and a very unpleasant side to him. And I felt that this was always skirted round which made him appear rather sort of hockey sticks and cricket bats and jolly uncles… a kind of dashing Victorian hero. He wasn’t like that at all. He was rather sardonic and arrogant, and he could be totally inconsiderate towards Watson. I tried to show both sides of his nature.

Wilmer responded to criticism of his portrayal by pointing out that he played the character as written.

People complained that I wasn't sympathetic but I didn't set out to be. I don't regard Holmes as a sympathetic character at all. It would have been hell to share rooms with him."

Once the series was underway, new opening and closing titles of The Speckled Band were recorded to better match the ongoing series so the pilot episode could be included in a package to be sold abroad. It has been reported that having viewed 25 September repeat of The Speckled Band, Wilmer came to the conclusion that his performance of Holmes was "too smooth, urbane, and civilised" and as filming progressed Wilmer altered his performance to reflect "a much more primitive person, more savage and ruthless." Wilmer himself disputed this in a 2009 interview.

I don’t remember saying that, no. I wonder where you read that! Certainly we had the finest director on that first one, a very good director. I have seen those two recently because I thought I’d better look at them again before writing the book. I don’t remember being unhappy with my performance in the first one; looking at it this time, I thought it was rather better.

At the time, due to strict agreements with the talent unions, BBC drama productions could generally only be repeated once within two years of the first transmission, and thus all twelve episodes were re-run over the late summer and early autumn of 1966, albeit in a different running order. The continued favourable reception led the BBC to proceed with the option of a second series.

=== Hiatus and changing lead ===
In the late summer and early autumn of 1966, the Wilmer series was granted a repeat run and the success of the run convinced the BBC to take up an option on a second run of episodes. BBC television drama chief Andrew Osborn contacted Wilmer's agent about potential availability for a second series. Wilmer declined the invitation after discovering the plan to reduce the number of rehearsal days. Wilmer later stated that the series was "fraught with difficulty", riddled with incompetence and the scripts often came in late. He claimed that the scriptwriters ranged from "the brilliant to the absolutely deplorable". Some of the scripts were so lacking in quality that Wilmer himself rewrote them, sometimes staying up until two o'clock in the morning rewriting. Years later, Wilmer would briefly return to the role (albeit in a supporting role) in Gene Wilder's The Adventure of Sherlock Holmes' Smarter Brother, with Thorley Walters as Dr. Watson.

The BBC searched for a new actor to play Holmes. The first person Osborn suggested was John Neville. Neville had previously assayed the role in A Study in Terror (1965) and Nigel Stock felt the film was quite good. Neville had prior commitments to the Nottingham Playhouse and was unable to appear in a series at the time.

Next, Osborn looked at Eric Porter. While Porter ultimately did not get the role, he did portray Professor Moriarty opposite Jeremy Brett's Holmes in Granada Television's The Adventures of Sherlock Holmes.

While the hunt continued for a new Sherlock Holmes, William Sterling was appointed to produce the second series. Sterling created a wish list of "International Guest Stars" to appear on the programme including Raymond Massey (an early interpreter of Holmes in the 1931 version of The Speckled Band) as Jefferson Hope in A Study in Scarlet, George Sanders as Mycroft Holmes in The Greek Interpreter, Leo McKern (who later portrayed Professor Moriarty in The Adventure of Sherlock Holmes' Smarter Brother) as Black Gorgiano in The Red Circle (though an adaptation of The Red Circle never took place in the series) and Hayley Mills as Alice Turner in The Boscombe Valley Mystery. None of which came to pass as the budgets would not allow for it.

Finally, Peter Cushing was approached to take over the role of Sherlock Holmes for the 1968 series. Having already played Holmes in the Hammer films adaptation of The Hound of the Baskervilles (1959), Cushing was eager to play the role again. Like Wilmer, Cushing was an avid fan of Doyle and looked forward to portraying the detective correctly.

What are the things that spring to mind about Sherlock Holmes? The way he keeps saying, "Elementary, my dear Watson," and the number of times he puffs that meerschaum pipe. But they are both untrue!

Unlike the Wilmer episodes, this series was produced in colour. Economic cut-backs required the production to abandon plans for celebrity villains such as Peter Ustinov, George Sanders, and Orson Welles.

The initial plan was for 90% of the programme to be shot on film on location. Production began with a two-part version of The Hound of the Baskervilles giving Cushing another go round at the tale. This version was the first actually filmed on Dartmoor and the cost ran £13,000 over budget causing the BBC to scale back their intentions and the bulk of the remainder of the series was shot on studio sets.

As filming continued Cushing found himself facing production difficulties the likes of which had prompted Wilmer to forgo another round. Wilmer summarised a later conversation with Cushing:

I asked him how he had enjoyed doing the Holmes series. He replied tersely to the effect that he would rather sweep Paddington Station for a living than go through the experience again. He had my sympathies!

Filming time was cut back. Cushing stated that the hectic schedule affected his performance.

Whenever I see some of those stories they upset me terribly, because it wasn't Peter Cushing doing his best as Sherlock Holmes - it was Peter Cushing looking relieved that he had remembered what to say and said it!

Twelve of the Cushing episodes except the episodes The Second Stain, The Greek Interpreter, Black Peter, and The Blue Carbuncle were repeated between July and September 1970, again in a different running order.

== Episodes ==
=== Detective (1964) ===
No. overall	Title	Written by	Directed by	Original air date	Status
1	"The Speckled Band"	Giles Cooper	Robin Midgley	18 May 1964	Survives

=== Sherlock Holmes (1965) ===
No. overall	No. in series	Title	Written by	Directed by	Original air date	Status
2	1	"The Illustrious Client"	Giles Cooper	Peter Sasdy	20 February 1965	Survives
3	2	"The Devil's Foot"	Giles Cooper	Max Varnel	27 February 1965	Survives
4	3	"The Copper Beeches"	Vincent Tilsley	Gareth Davies	6 March 1965	Survives
5	4	"The Red-Headed League"	Anthony Read	Peter Duguid	13 March 1965	Survives
6	5	"The Abbey Grange"	Clifford Witting	Peter Cregeen	20 March 1965	First half missing; second half survives
7	6	"The Six Napoleons"	Giles Cooper	Gareth Davies	27 March 1965	Survives
8	7	"The Man with the Twisted Lip"	Jan Read	Eric Tayler	3 April 1965	Survives
9	8	"The Beryl Coronet"	Nicholas Palmer	Max Varnel	10 April 1965	Survives
10	9	"The Bruce-Partington Plans"	Giles Cooper	Shaun Sutton	17 April 1965	First half survives; second half soundtrack only survives
11	10	"Charles Augustus Milverton"	Clifford Witting	Philip Dudley	24 April 1965	Survives
12	11	"The Retired Colourman"	Jan Read	Michael Hayes	1 May 1965	Survives
13	12	"The Disappearance of Lady Frances Carfax"	Vincent Tilsley	Shaun Sutton	8 May 1965	Survives

=== Sir Arthur Conan Doyle's Sherlock Holmes (1968) ===
No. overall	No. in series	Title	Written by	Directed by	Original air date	Status
14	1	"The Second Stain"	Jennifer Stuart	Henri Safran	9 September 1968	Missing, audio soundtrack survives
15	2	"The Dancing Men"	Michael and Mollie Hardwick	William Sterling	16 September 1968	Missing
16	3	"A Study in Scarlet"	Hugh Leonard	Henri Safran	23 September 1968	Survives
17	4	"The Hound of the Baskervilles" (Part 1)	Hugh Leonard	Graham Evans	30 September 1968	Survives
18	5	"The Hound of the Baskervilles" (Part 2)	Hugh Leonard	Graham Evans	7 October 1968	Survives
19	6	"The Boscombe Valley Mystery"	Bruce Stewart	Viktors Ritelis	14 October 1968	Survives
20	7	"The Greek Interpreter"	John Gould	David Saire	21 October 1968	Missing
21	8	"The Naval Treaty"	John Gould	Antony Kearey	28 October 1968	Missing
22	9	"Thor Bridge"	Harry Moore	Antony Kearey	4 November 1968	Missing
23	10	"The Musgrave Ritual"	Alexander Baron	Viktors Ritelis	11 November 1968	Missing
24	11	"Black Peter"	Richard Harris	Antony Kearey	18 November 1968	Missing
25	12	"Wisteria Lodge"	Alexander Baron	Roger Jenkins	25 November 1968	Missing
26	13	"Shoscombe Old Place"	Donald Tosh	Bill Bain	2 December 1968	Missing
27	14	"The Solitary Cyclist"	Stanley Miller	Viktors Ritelis	9 December 1968	Missing, audio soundtrack survives
28	15	"The Sign of Four"	Michael and Mollie Hardwick	William Sterling	16 December 1968	Survives
29	16	"The Blue Carbuncle"	Stanley Miller	Bill Bain	23 December 1968	Survives

=== Planned continuation ===
The Cushing series of 1968 was a success and the BBC's Andrew Osborn was interested in making a third series. Had this third series commenced, the plan was to dramatise stories from The Exploits of Sherlock Holmes, a 1954 short story collection written by Adrian Conan Doyle (son of Arthur Conan Doyle) and John Dickson Carr, but was not eventually made.

=== Unused scripts ===
1965:

- "Charles Augustus Milverton" (different adaptation)
- "The Red-Headed League" (different adaptation)
- "The Blue Carbuncle" (different adaptation to 1968 version)
- "The Three Garridebs"
- "The Priory School"
- "The Boscombe Valley Mystery" (different adaptation to 1968 version)
- "The Golden Pince-Nez"
- "The Sussex Vampire"

1968:

- "The Hound of the Baskervilles" (two episodes, different adaptation)
- "The Musgrave Ritual" (different adaptation)
- "Wisteria Lodge" (different adaptation)
- "The Red Circle"

== Missing episodes ==
The series was unfortunately subject to the tape-wiping and "junking" practice that often occurred in early British television during the 1950s and 1960s. The film tapes and video tapes of the period were expensive and most British television broadcasters at the time didn't plan to air many domestic reruns, hence the tendency to wipe tapes, in order to reuse them for filming. Another related issue was poor archiving of episodes. Tens of television series lost at least one or several episodes, or above half of their episodes in this manner. In some cases, entire series and serials are presumed completely lost. The lack of home video technology at the time also exacerbated the problem: There was less of an incentive to publish the series after broadcast for public consumption, and outside of specialised film studios, there was virtually no way to record programmes while they were being broadcast. This is why much of the unofficially recorded material that survives from lost or missing episodes exists only in the form of audio recordings.

Sherlock Holmes is not unique in its losses, as many broadcasters regularly cleared their archives in this manner. Until the BBC changed its archiving policy in 1978, thousands of hours of programming, in all genres, were deleted. Other affected BBC series include the most famous present-day running series Doctor Who. Other non-running series that have lost episodes include Dad's Army, Z-Cars, The Wednesday Play, Till Death Us Do Part and Not Only... But Also. ITV regional franchisees, such as Rediffusion Television and Associated Television, also deleted many programmes, including early videotaped episodes of The Avengers. Since the latter half of the 1970s, British television networks, television fans and enthusiasts, and official institutions such as the British Film Institute have developed an effort to recover and restore missing episodes of many 1950s and 1960s television programmes.

The Wilmer series survives largely intact to this day, with only two episodes incomplete. "The Abbey Grange" is missing its first half, while "The Bruce-Partington Plans" is missing its second half. The 2015 DVD release of the first series reconstructed the incomplete episodes as best as possible. For "The Abbey Grange", Douglas Wilmer was engaged to read the original story. For "The Bruce-Partington Plans", a sound recording was included of the second half of the episode, recorded off the television during the programme's original transmission. This was matched with publicity photographs for the episode and images of the script to reveal the end of the story and enable a complete viewing experience.

The 1968 series with Cushing was less fortunate, with many episodes now believed lost, despite the fact that it was made in colour and was shown abroad as late as 1975 (Spain). Only a handful of the episodes have survived, namely "A Study in Scarlet", "The Hound of the Baskervilles" (two parts), "The Boscombe Valley Mystery", "The Sign of Four" and "The Blue Carbuncle". These were saved partly because they were chosen as samples of the series for distribution abroad. All surviving episodes are available on DVD, with a Blu-ray release done by Severin Films in 2023. In 2019 brief extracts from the episodes "The Second Stain", "The Dancing Men", "The Naval Treaty" and "Black Peter" were found in Belgium by Dutch historian Reinier Wels, and independently, an audio recording of "The Solitary Cyclist" was found by David Stuart Davies. The clips were included as a bonus feature on a DVD release of a TV interview with Peter Cushing, available in combination with a book.

== German remake ==
The West German WDR channel produced Sherlock Holmes (1967–1968), a six-episode series based on the scripts from Detective and Sherlock Holmes. Erich Schellow starred as Holmes, and Paul Edwin Roth as Watson.

== Reception ==
The initial 1965 series attracted over 11 million viewers per episode. The 1968 series was more successful, with upwards of 15.5 million viewers and one episode topping the top 20 programmes chart.

Reviewing the series for DVD Talk, Stuart Galbraith IV wrote, "To my surprise I generally preferred the Wilmer episodes to those starring Peter Cushing, even though I consider myself more a fan of Cushing while I merely admire Wilmer as an excellent actor. ... This series may seem downright prehistoric to some, but I found it to be surprisingly atmospheric, intelligent, and engaging, and Wilmer and Stock make a fine Holmes and Watson, in the top 25% certainly."

Galbraith further said of the Cushing episodes, "The 1968 Sherlock Holmes television series isn't really up to the level of the best film and TV adaptations, but it's still fun to see cult character actor Peter Cushing sink his teeth into the role again, and the adaptations themselves are respectable, just not distinctive."

== Home media ==
In 1996, BBC Video released a single VHS cassette in the UK containing Wilmer episodes "The Speckled Band" and "The Illustrious Client".

The BFI released a four-DVD collection of the Wilmer series in 2015, including all surviving episodes and reconstructions of the incomplete episodes, five audio commentaries, an interview with Wilmer, an illustrated booklet, and other special features. In 2010, BBC Worldwide released a two-DVD set in the US containing all surviving complete episodes from the 1965 series, omitting the two incomplete episodes.

In 2002, BBC Learning released Cushing's The Hound of the Baskervilles on DVD, for sale by direct mail order in the UK only.

All six surviving Cushing episodes have since been released on three DVDs with two episodes apiece, both separately and boxed together, in the UK by 2 Entertain Video and Germany by Pidax. In the US, A&E Home Video released a three-DVD box set in 2013; and in 2024, Severin Films released the six standard-definition, videotaped episodes in a two-disc, 1080p Blu-ray set.
