= His Last Bow =

Collection of short stories by Arthur Conan Doyle

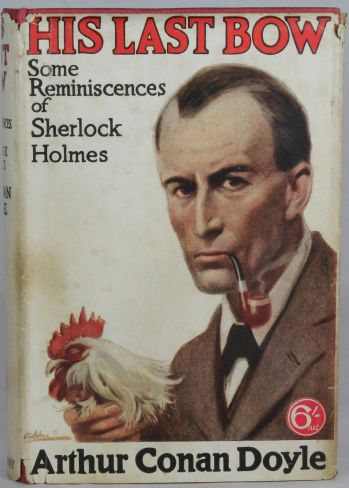
- First edition cover
- Author: Arthur Conan Doyle
- Illustrator: Richard Gutschmidt
- Cover artist: Joseph van Abbé
- Language: English
- Series: Sherlock Holmes
- Genre: Detective fiction
- Publisher: John Murray
- Publication date: 22 October 1917
- Publication place: United Kingdom
- Media type: Print (hardcover)
- Pages: 305
- Preceded by: The Valley of Fear
- Followed by: The Case-Book of Sherlock Holmes
- Text: His Last Bow at Wikisource

His Last Bow: Some Reminiscences of Sherlock Holmes is a 1917 collection of previously published Sherlock Holmes stories by British writer Arthur Conan Doyle, including the titular short story, "His Last Bow. The War Service of Sherlock Holmes" (1917). The collection's first US edition adjusts the anthology's subtitle to Some Later Reminiscences of Sherlock Holmes.

All editions contain a brief preface, by "John H. Watson, M.D.", that assures readers that as of the date of publication, Holmes is long retired from his profession of detective but is still alive and well, albeit suffering from a touch of rheumatism.

== Publication history ==
The book was published in the UK by John Murray in October 1917, and in the US by George H. Doran Co. that same month.

The collection contains "The Adventure of the Cardboard Box", which was also included in the first American edition of The Memoirs of Sherlock Holmes (1894) but was dropped from later editions of that book.

Six of the stories were published in The Strand Magazine between September 1908 and December 1913. The Strand published "The Adventure of Wisteria Lodge" as "A Reminiscence of Sherlock Holmes" and divided it into two parts, called "The Singular Experience of Mr. John Scott Eccles" and "The Tiger of San Pedro". Later printings of His Last Bow correct Wistaria to Wisteria.

The final story, "His Last Bow. The War Service of Sherlock Holmes" (1917), an epilogue about Holmes' war service, was first published in Collier's on 22 September 1917—one month before the book's premiere on 22 October.

== Contents ==
Preface by John H. Watson (1917)

1. "The Adventure of Wisteria Lodge" (1908)
2. "The Adventure of the Cardboard Box" (1893)
3. "The Adventure of the Red Circle" (1911)
4. "The Adventure of the Bruce-Partington Plans" (1908)
5. "The Adventure of the Dying Detective" (1913)
6. "The Disappearance of Lady Frances Carfax" (1911)
7. "The Adventure of the Devil's Foot" (1910)
8. "His Last Bow. The War Service of Sherlock Holmes" (1917)

== Adaptations ==
Series for which all the stories in His Last Bow were adapted include the Sherlock Holmes Stoll film series (1921–1923) and the radio series The Adventures of Sherlock Holmes (1930–1936). All the stories in the collection except "His Last Bow" were adapted as episodes of the 1939–1950 radio series The New Adventures of Sherlock Holmes, and all were dramatised for the BBC Sherlock Holmes 1952–1969 radio series.

Except for the short story "His Last Bow", the stories in the collection were adapted for television as episodes of the Granada television series (1984–1994). His Last Bow was dramatised for BBC Radio 4 in 1994 as part of the BBC Sherlock Holmes 1989–1998 radio series. All the stories in the collection were adapted as episodes of the radio series The Classic Adventures of Sherlock Holmes (2005–2016). The stories in His Last Bow have also been adapted for various other productions.
