= The Devil's Foot (film) =

1921 British film by Maurice Elvey

- Directed by: Maurice Elvey
- Based on: "The Adventure of the Devil's Foot" by Arthur Conan Doyle
- Produced by: Jeffrey Bernerd
- Starring: See below
- Cinematography: Germain Burger
- Release date: 1921
- Running time: 2 reels; 2513 feet
- Country: United Kingdom
- Language: English

The Devil's Foot is a 1921 British short film directed by Maurice Elvey starring Eille Norwood as Sherlock Holmes.

Following "The Dying Detective" (1921), the film is the second in the Stoll Pictures' short film series The Adventures of Sherlock Holmes.

== Plot summary ==
While on vacation, Sherlock Holmes and Doctor Watson walk by the sea. Hoping to ask for directions back to their inn, they call upon a house but discover three dead people seated at a table and with no signs of violence. Initially, the victims' brother Tregennis is suspected, but when he is killed in a similar way, then the explorer Dr. Sterndale becomes a suspect.

Sterndale shows Holmes and Watson a note where Tregennis confesses to the murder of his siblings to acquire their property. The last third of the film is Sterndale's story told to the pair through a series of Flashbacks. Sterndale tells them that Tregennis had shown a great interest in Sterndale's exotic poisons and that Sterndale was in love with the sister and killed Tregennis in an act of revenge. The flashback shows Sterndale forcing Tregennis to write a confession at gunpoint. Holmes questions Sterndale for taking justice into his own hands, but when the police arrive, he tells them that Tregennis had committed suicide.

=== Differences from source material ===
The beginning of the film differs from "The Adventure of the Devil's Foot".

== Cast ==
- Eille Norwood as Sherlock Holmes
- Hubert Willis as Dr. John Watson
- Harvey Braban as Mortimer Tregennis
- Hugh Buckler as Dr. Sterndale

== Reception ==
In a review in 2011, Christopher Campbell called the short film a "relatively faithful adaptation", though also appreciated the liberty taken with the source material for the beginning of the film. Campbell commented on the film's use of intertitles, writing that the film is "quite verbal for a silent picture", but that this is not unexpected for a mystery film.
