= The Adventure of the Bruce-Partington Plans =

1908 short story by Arthur Conan Doyle

- Short story by Arthur Conan Doyle
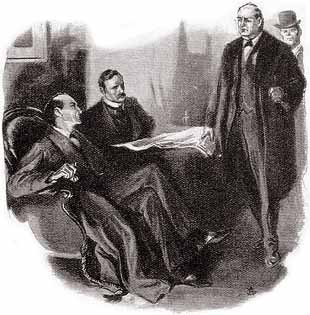
- Mycroft Holmes visiting his brother, 1908 illustration by Arthur Twidle in The Strand Magazine

Publication
- Publication date: December 1908

Chronology
- Series: His Last Bow
The Adventure of Wisteria Lodge	The Adventure of the Devil's Foot

"The Adventure of the Bruce-Partington Plans" is one of the 56 Sherlock Holmes short stories written by Sir Arthur Conan Doyle. It is one of eight stories in the cycle collected as His Last Bow (1917), and is the second and final main appearance of Mycroft Holmes. It was originally published in The Strand Magazine in the United Kingdom and in Collier's in the United States in 1908.

Doyle ranked "The Adventure of the Bruce-Partington Plans" fourteenth in a list of his nineteen favourite Sherlock Holmes stories.

== Plot ==
The monotony of thick smog-shrouded London is broken by a sudden visit from Holmes' brother Mycroft. He has come about some missing, secret submarine plans. Seven of the ten plans have been found with Arthur Cadogan West's body, but the three "most essential" papers are still missing. West was a young clerk in a government office at Royal Arsenal, Woolwich, whose body was found next to the Underground tracks near the Aldgate tube station, his head crushed. He had little money with him (although there appears to have been no robbery), theatre tickets, and curiously, no Underground ticket.

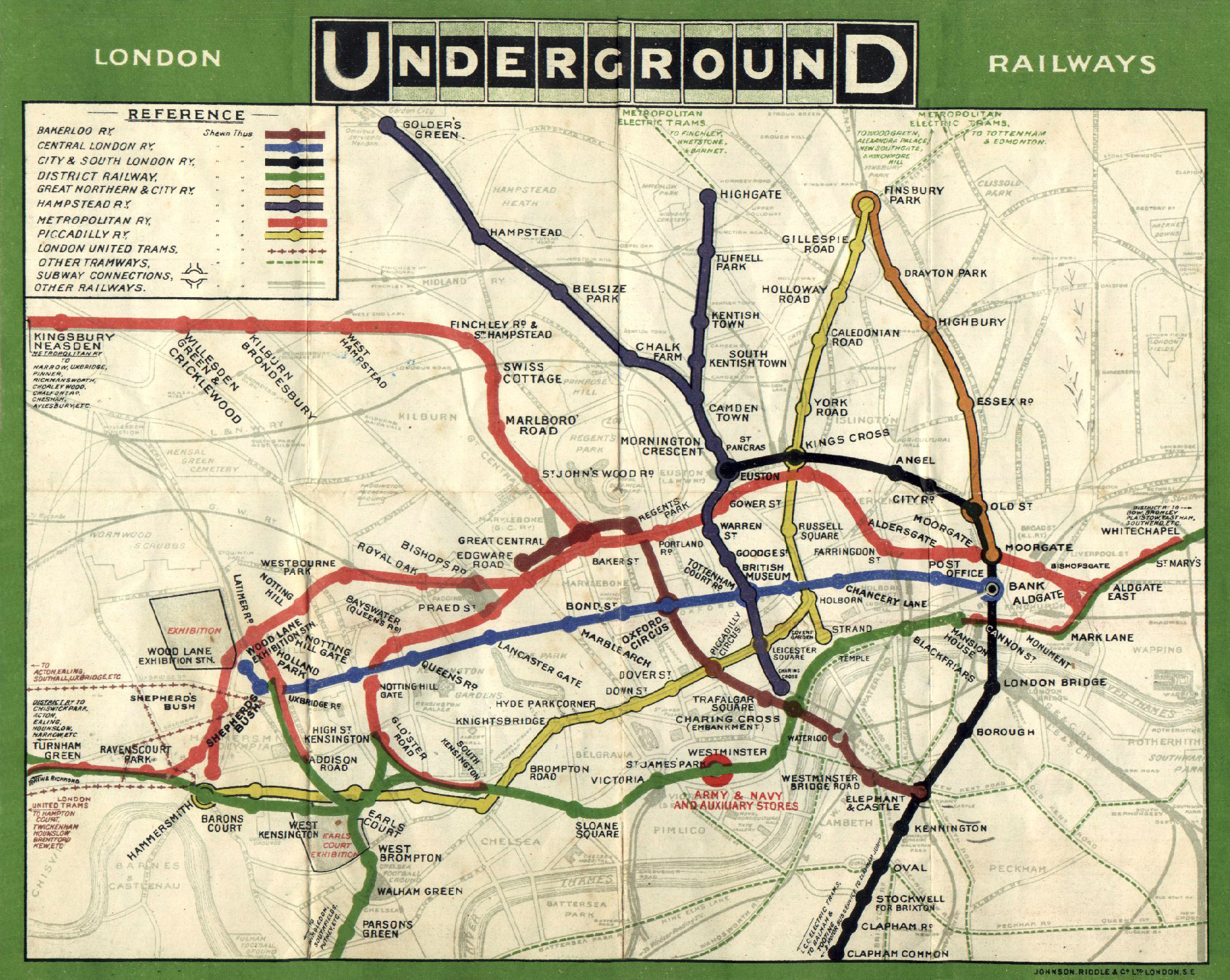
"Underground"-branded Tube map from 1908 showing the District and Metropolitan lines with Aldgate at right and Kensington at lower left

Inspector Lestrade tells Holmes that a passenger reported hearing a thud, as though a body had fallen on the track, close to where West's body was found. The passenger could not see anything, however, owing to the thick fog. After an examination of the track near Aldgate, Holmes concludes that West had been killed elsewhere, was deposited on the roof of an Underground train, and fell off when the jarring action of going across a railway point at Aldgate shook the coach.

Holmes decides to visit Sir James Walter, who was in charge of the papers. He has, however, died, apparently of a broken heart from the loss of his honour when the papers were stolen, according to his brother Colonel Valentine Walter. On visiting West's fiancée, Holmes learns that West had something on his mind for the last week or so of his life; he had commented on how easily a traitor could get hold of "the secret" and how much foreign agents would pay for it. On the night in question, West and his fiancée were on their way to the theatre, when he suddenly dashed off into the fog and did not return.

Holmes next goes to the office from which the plans were stolen. Sidney Johnson, the senior clerk, tells Holmes that, as always, he was the last man out of the office that night, and that he had put the papers in the safe. Anyone coming in afterwards to steal them would have needed three keys (for the building, the office, and the safe), but no duplicates were found on West's body, and only the late Sir James had all three keys. Johnson also mentions that one of the seven recovered papers includes a unique invention, without which the submarine could not be properly built. Holmes also discovers that it is possible to see what is happening inside the office from outside, as the iron shutters do not close properly.

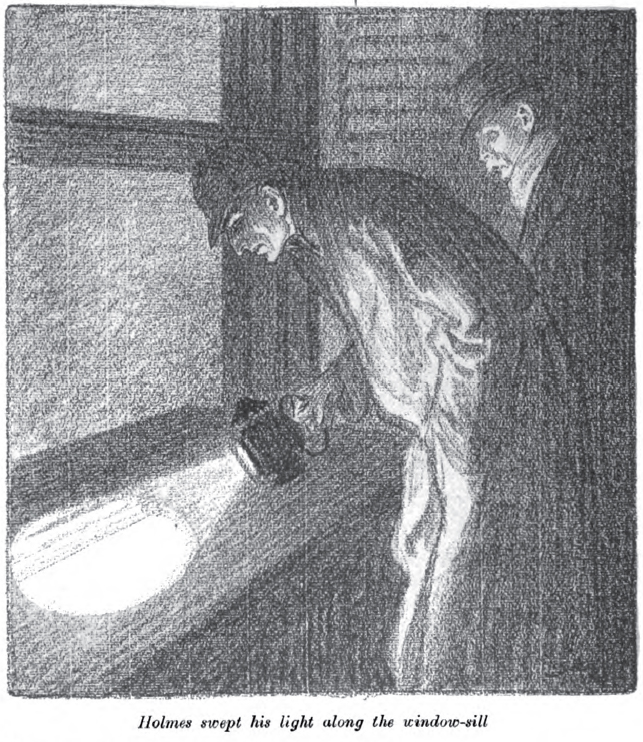
Holmes and Watson examine the window, 1908 illustration by Frederic Dorr Steele in Collier's

After leaving, Holmes finds that the clerk at the nearby Underground station remembers seeing West on the evening in question. Deeply shaken by something, he had taken a train to London Bridge.

Acting on information from Mycroft, and on what he has learnt thus far, Holmes identifies a person of interest: Hugo Oberstein, a known foreign agent who left town shortly after West's murder. Some small reconnaissance shows Holmes that Oberstein's house backs onto an above-ground portion of the Underground line; furthermore, owing to traffic at a nearby junction, trains often stop right under his windows. It seems clear that West's body was laid on the train roof just there.

Holmes and Dr. Watson break into Oberstein's empty house and closely examine the windows, finding that the grime has been smudged, and there is a bloodstain. An underground train stops right under the window. Some messages from the Daily Telegraph agony column, all seeming to allude to a business deal, are also found, posted by "Pierrot". Holmes posts a similarly cryptic message in the Daily Telegraph demanding a meeting, signing it Pierrot, in the hopes that the thief might show up at Oberstein's house.

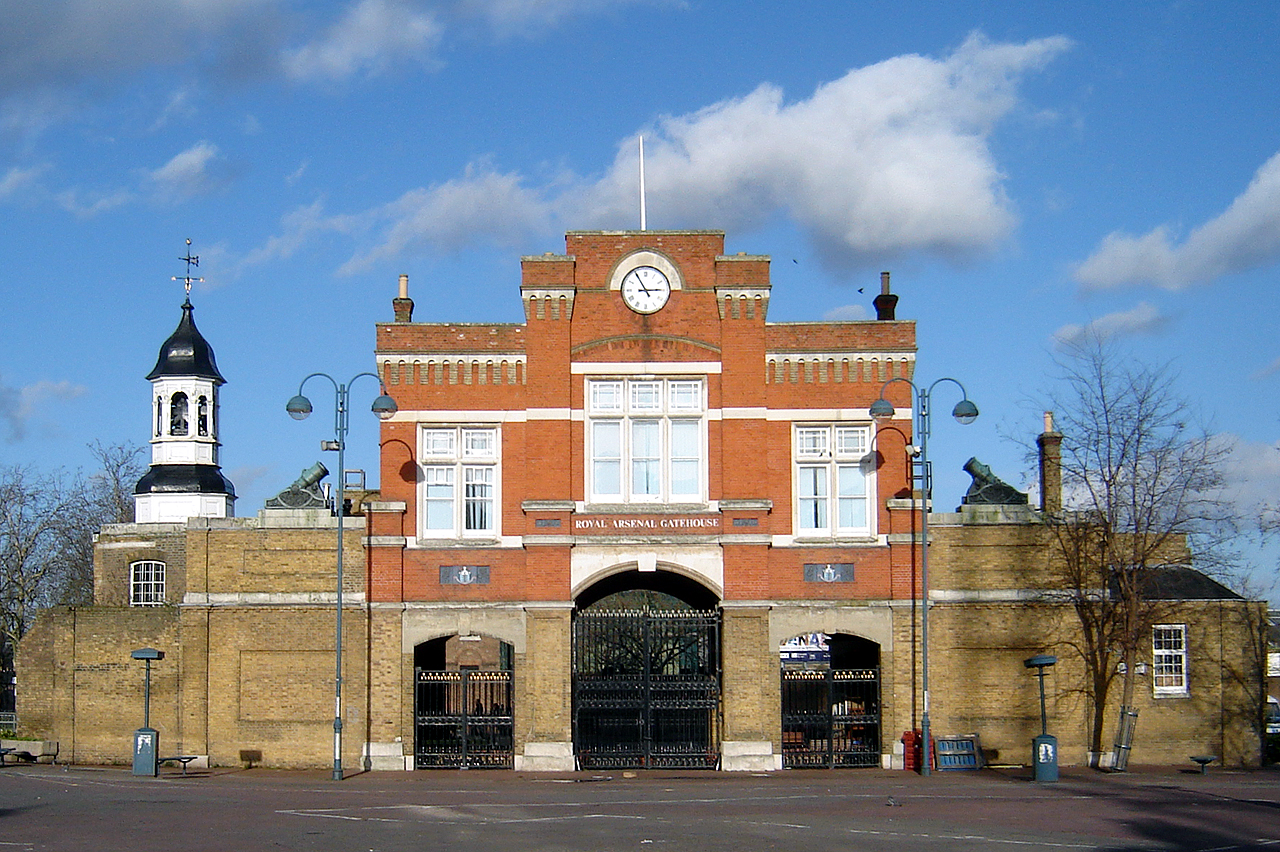
Woolwich Royal Arsenal gatehouse (February 2007)

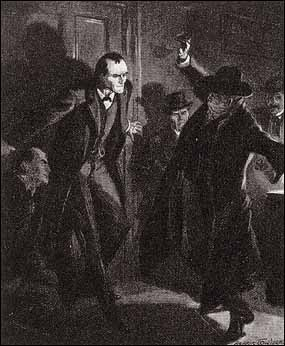
Mycroft Holmes, Sherlock Holmes, Lestrade, and Watson confront Colonel Walter, 1908 illustration by Arthur Twidle

It works. Colonel Valentine Walter shows up and is stunned to find Holmes, Watson, Lestrade, and Mycroft all waiting for him. He confesses to the theft of the plans, but swears that it was Oberstein who killed West. West had followed the Colonel to Oberstein's and then intervened, and Oberstein had dealt West a fatal blow to the head. Oberstein then decided, over the Colonel's objections, that he had to keep three of the papers, because they could not be copied in a short time. He then got the idea of putting the other seven in West's pocket and putting him on a train roof outside his window, reasoning that he would be blamed for the theft when his body was found.

Deep in debt, Colonel Walter had acted out of a need for money. He redeems himself somewhat by agreeing to write to Oberstein, whose address on the Continent he knows, inviting him to come back to England for the fourth, vital page. This ruse also works; Oberstein is imprisoned, and the missing pages of the plans are recovered from his trunk. Colonel Walter dies in prison, not long after starting his sentence. For his efforts, Holmes is given an emerald tie pin by "a certain gracious lady", implied to be Queen Victoria, as the pin was received at Windsor in the 1890s.

== Publication history ==
"The Adventure of the Bruce-Partington Plans" was published in the UK in The Strand Magazine in December 1908, and in the US in Collier's on 12 December 1908. The story was published with six illustrations by Arthur Twidle in the Strand, and with five illustrations by Frederic Dorr Steele in Collier's. The story was included in the short story collection His Last Bow, which was published in the UK and the US in October 1917.

== Adaptations ==
=== Film and television ===
A 1922 entry in the Stoll film series was an adaptation of "The Adventure of the Bruce-Partington Plans". It starred Eille Norwood as Sherlock Holmes and Hubert Willis as Dr. Watson, and featured Lewis Gilbert as Mycroft Holmes and Malcolm Tod as Cadogan West.

The story was adapted by Giles Cooper as an episode of the 1965 BBC television series Sherlock Holmes starring Douglas Wilmer as Holmes and Nigel Stock as Watson. Only the first of two reels of the 16mm telerecording of the episode exists, although the full soundtrack survives. The episode was one of those remade for the West-German WDR Sherlock Holmes series (1967–1968), which exists in full.

The 1986 television film The Twentieth Century Approaches, the fifth instalment of The Adventures of Sherlock Holmes and Dr. Watson, features the story.

The story was adapted for a 1988 episode of the television series The Return of Sherlock Holmes starring Jeremy Brett as Sherlock Holmes, Edward Hardwicke as Doctor Watson and Charles Gray as Mycroft Holmes. In this version, Inspector Lestrade is replaced by Inspector Bradstreet, who allows Colonel Valentine to go free after assisting with Oberstein's capture.

The plot of the Matt Frewer 2001 TV movie The Royal Scandal is a combination of "A Scandal in Bohemia" and "The Bruce-Partington Plans".

The story is partially used in the episode "The Great Game" (2010) of the television series Sherlock.

=== Audio ===
The story was adapted by Edith Meiser as an episode of the American radio series The Adventures of Sherlock Holmes. The episode, which aired on 22 October 1931, featured Richard Gordon as Sherlock Holmes and Leigh Lovell as Dr. Watson. Other productions of the story aired in March 1935, with Louis Hector as Holmes and Lovell as Watson, and October 1936, with Gordon as Holmes and Harry West as Watson.

The story was also adapted by Meiser as an episode of the American radio series The New Adventures of Sherlock Holmes that aired in 1939, with Basil Rathbone as Holmes and Nigel Bruce as Watson. Additional episodes in the series adapted from the story aired in 1941 and 1943 (both with Rathbone as Holmes and Bruce as Watson) and 1948 (with John Stanley as Holmes and Ian Martin as Watson).

John Gielgud played Sherlock Holmes and Ralph Richardson played Watson in an adaptation of the story that aired on the BBC Light Programme in 1954. John Gielgud's brother Val Gielgud played Mycroft Holmes. John Cazabon played Inspector Lestrade, and William Fox played Colonel Valentine Walter. The production aired on NBC radio in 1955.

The story was adapted for the BBC Light Programme in 1967 by Michael Hardwick, as part of the 1952–1969 radio series starring Carleton Hobbs as Holmes and Norman Shelley as Watson. Felix Felton played Mycroft Holmes.

"The Bruce-Partington Plans" was dramatised for BBC Radio 4 in 1994 by Bert Coules as part of the 1989–1998 radio series starring Clive Merrison as Holmes and Michael Williams as Watson, featuring Jamie Glover as Cadogan West and Stephen Thorne as Inspector Lestrade.

In 2010, the story was adapted as an episode of The Classic Adventures of Sherlock Holmes, a series on the American radio show Imagination Theatre, starring John Patrick Lowrie as Holmes and Lawrence Albert as Watson, with Rick May as Lestrade.

In August 2026, the podcast Sherlock & Co. adapted the story in a four-episode adventure called "The Bruce-Partington Plans", starring Harry Attwell as Sherlock Holmes, Paul Waggott as Dr. John Watson and Marta da Silva as Mariana "Mrs. Hudson" Ametxazurra. Mycroft Holmes is played by Thomas Mitchells, Lily Lestrade is played by Jasmine Kerr, and Walter Valentine is played by Luke Jasztal. As a modern retelling, the plans are re-worked as details outlining British Spys.
