= The Adventure of Wisteria Lodge =

- Short story by Arthur Conan Doyle
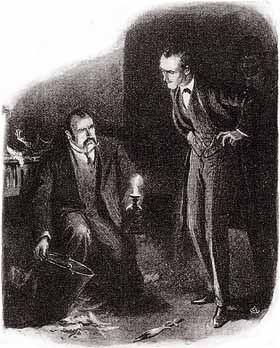
- John Scott Eccles with Holmes, 1908 illustration by Arthur Twidle

Text available at Wikisource
- Country: United Kingdom
- Language: English
- Genre: Detective fiction short stories

Publication
- Published in: Strand Magazine
- Publication date: August 1908

Chronology
- Series: His Last Bow
The Valley of Fear	The Adventure of the Bruce-Partington Plans

"The Adventure of Wisteria Lodge" is one of the fifty-six Sherlock Holmes short stories written by Arthur Conan Doyle. One of eight stories in the volume His Last Bow, it is a lengthy, two-part story consisting of "The Singular Experience of Mr. John Scott Eccles" and "The Tiger of San Pedro", which on original publication in The Strand bore the collective title of "A Reminiscence of Mr. Sherlock Holmes".

== Plot ==
Sherlock Holmes is visited by John Scott Eccles, who wishes to discuss something "grotesque". No sooner has he arrived at 221B Baker Street than Inspector Gregson also shows up, along with Inspector Baynes of the Surrey Constabulary. They wish a statement from Eccles about the murder of Aloysius Garcia near Esher the previous night.

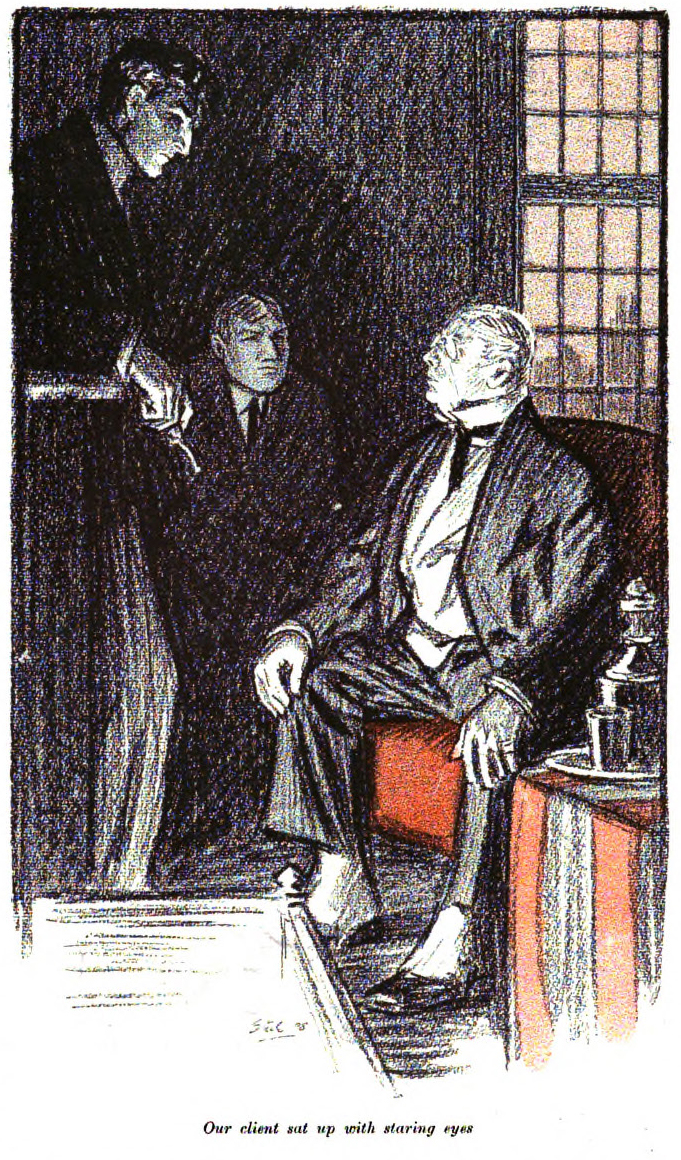
Eccles (right) hears of Garcia's death, 1908 illustration by Frederic Dorr Steele in Collier's.

Eccles explains that he spent the night at Wisteria Lodge, Garcia's rented house, but when he woke up in the morning, he found that Garcia and his servants had all disappeared, leaving him alone in the house. Eccles mentions that a note, delivered during dinner the previous evening, had caused great consternation to Garcia and may have had some connection with the household's disappearance. The story told by him seems inconsistent with the physical evidence, yet the policemen never doubt his story, demonstrating to Holmes that Eccles must have been invited to provide a fake alibi, which would have carried much weight by virtue of him being an extremely proper and respectable gentleman.

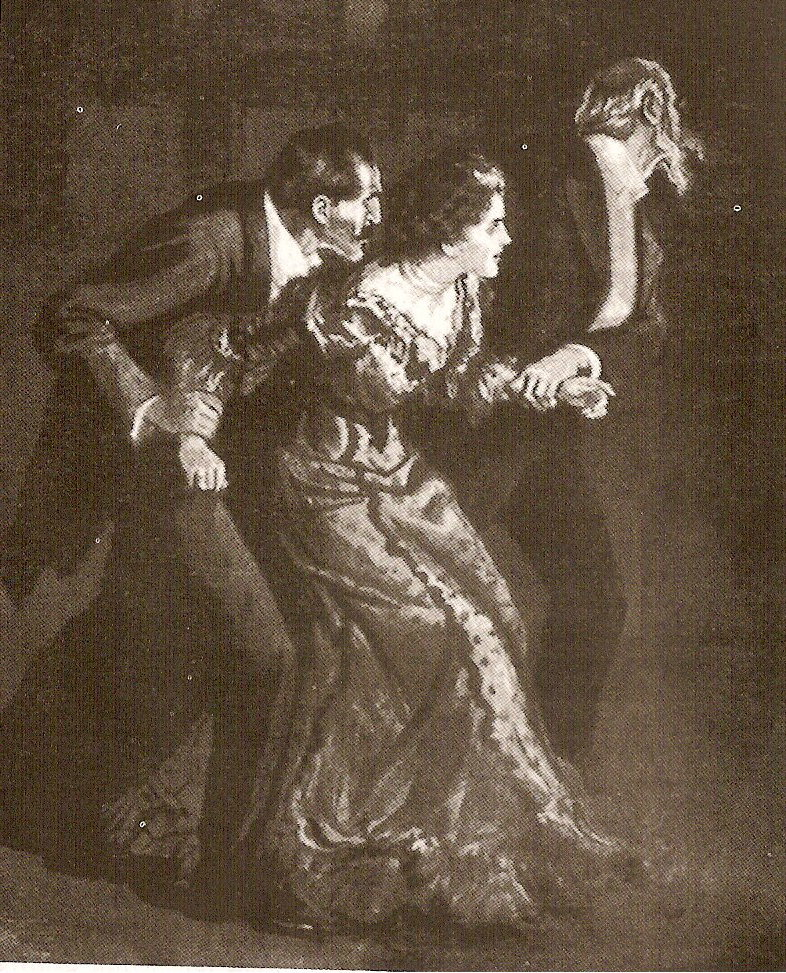
Murillo confining Miss Burnet, 1908 illustration by Arthur Twidle.

Holmes' investigation leads him to the Henderson household, whose master has spent time in the tropics, and whose secretary is a dark-skinned foreigner. Holmes believes that the cryptic note came from this household and the writer could only be the house's governess, Miss Burnet, who has not been seen since the night of the murder.

That night, the Hendersons flee by train. Miss Burnet escapes with the help of a former gardener. It is revealed that "Henderson" is in fact Don Juan Murillo, an overthrown dictator from Central America who left a bloody trail behind as he escaped to England. Miss Burnet's real name is Mrs. Victor Durando. Her late husband was San Pedro's ambassador to Britain and a potential political rival to Murillo. Murillo had him recalled and shot so that he would not pose a threat to Murillo's position. Fortunately, Mrs. Durando stayed behind in England and avoided harm herself. She went on to change her name and secure the position as governess to Henderson's children in order to get closer to and spy on him.

Murillo and his secretary give the police the slip in London, and resurface in Madrid under new aliases. However, they are both murdered, and their killers are never caught.

== Publication history ==
"The Adventure of Wisteria Lodge" was first published in the US in Collier's on 15 August 1908, and in the UK in The Strand Magazine in September–October 1908. In the Strand, the story was published in two parts: "The Singular Experience of Mr. John Scott Eccles" and "The Tiger of San Pedro". The story was published with six illustrations by Frederic Dorr Steele in Collier's, and with ten illustrations by Arthur Twidle in the Strand. It was included in the short story collection His Last Bow, which was published in the UK and the US in October 1917.

== Adaptations ==
=== Film and television ===
- A short silent film titled The Tiger of San Pedro (1921) was based on the story. It was one of the short films in the Sherlock Holmes film series by Stoll Pictures, and starred Eille Norwood as Sherlock Holmes and Hubert Willis as Dr. Watson.
- The story was adapted for the 1968 BBC series with Peter Cushing. The episode is now lost.
- The Granada TV adaptation with Jeremy Brett largely followed the original story with a few exceptions. At the end Murillo and his "secretary" Lucas are shot and killed on a train by Garcia's avengers. Such a scenario is only vaguely implied in the original story.
- The NHK puppet show Sherlock Holmes made an episode loosely based on the story.

=== Radio and audio dramas ===
- The story was dramatised by Edith Meiser as a 1931 episode of the American radio series The Adventures of Sherlock Holmes, with Richard Gordon as Sherlock Holmes and Leigh Lovell as Dr. Watson. Other episodes based on the story aired in January 1935, with Louis Hector as Holmes and Lovell as Watson, and in September 1936, with Gordon as Holmes and Harry West as Watson.
- Meiser also adapted the story for the American radio series The New Adventures of Sherlock Holmes, with Basil Rathbone as Holmes and Nigel Bruce as Watson. The episode aired in December 1939. Other episodes based on the story aired in 1943 and in 1947 (with Tom Conway as Holmes and Bruce as Watson).
- "Wisteria Lodge" was adapted for the BBC Light Programme as part of the 1952–1969 radio series starring Carleton Hobbs as Holmes and Norman Shelley as Watson. The production was adapted by Michael Hardwick and aired on 26 December 1966.
- "Wisteria Lodge" was dramatised for BBC Radio 4 in 1994 by Bert Coules as part of the 1989–1998 radio series starring Clive Merrison as Holmes and Michael Williams as Watson.
- In 2008, the story was adapted as an episode of The Classic Adventures of Sherlock Holmes, a series on the American radio show Imagination Theatre, with John Patrick Lowrie as Holmes and Lawrence Albert as Watson.
- In 2025, the podcast Sherlock & Co. adapted the story in a three-episode adventure called "Wisteria Lodge", starring Harry Attwell as Sherlock Holmes, Paul Waggott as Dr. John Watson and Marta da Silva as Mariana "Mrs. Hudson" Ametxazurra.
