= The Adventure of the Devil's Foot =

Short story by Arthur Conan Doyle

- Short story by Arthur Conan Doyle
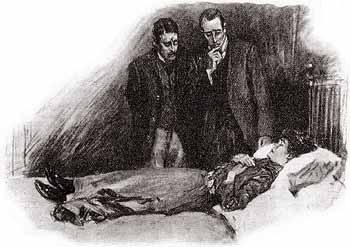
- 1910 illustration by Gilbert Holiday - Holmes and Watson view Brenda Tregennis' body

Publication
- Publication date: 1910

Chronology
- Series: His Last Bow
The Adventure of the Bruce-Partington Plans	The Adventure of the Red Circle

"The Adventure of the Devil's Foot" from 1910 is one of the 56 Sherlock Holmes short stories written by Arthur Conan Doyle. It is one of eight stories in the cycle collected as His Last Bow.

== Plot ==
Sherlock Holmes and Dr. Watson find themselves at Poldhu in Cornwall one spring. The holiday is interrupted when the local vicar Mr. Roundhay and his lodger Mortimer Tregennis visit Holmes, asking for his assistance. The night before, Tregennis had gone to visit his three siblings, played whist with them, and then left. The next morning, the housekeeper found the trio still sitting in their places at the table; the brothers, George and Owen, had gone insane, and the sister, Brenda, was dead.

Dr. Leon Sterndale, a famous hunter-explorer and a cousin of the Tregennises, aborts his sailing from Plymouth after the vicar wires him with the tragic news. He asks Holmes what his suspicions are, and is displeased when Holmes will not voice any.

The next morning, the vicar informs Holmes that Mortimer Tregennis has died in the same way as his sister. The two men, along with Watson, rush to Mortimer's room. A lamp is lit and smoking on the table beside the dead man. Holmes deduces that a poison, activated by combustion and affecting the cognitive functions, is the murder weapon; a fire was burning in the first murder room and a lamp in the second, and people who entered them either felt ill or fainted. After a dangerous experiment in which he tests the residue of the poison on himself and is only just rescued by Watson, Holmes reveals that Mortimer Tregennis is guilty of the first crime and further deduces that Dr. Sterndale was Mortimer's murderer.

Dr. Sterndale confesses that he held Mortimer at gunpoint and forced him to breathe the poison. It comes from a plant called the Devil's-foot root. Sterndale once described the powder to Mortimer Tregennis, who stole some from Sterndale's collection of African curiosities, then attempted to murder his siblings by throwing it on the fire just before he left. It is revealed that Sterndale was passionately in love with Brenda Tregennis, but was still married to and unable to divorce his first wife who had abandoned him years ago. Holmes' sympathies in this matter lie with Sterndale, and he tells him to go back to his work in Africa and never return.

== Publication history ==
"The Adventure of the Devil's Foot" was first published in the UK in The Strand Magazine in December 1910. It was first published in the United States in the US edition of the Strand in January and February 1911. The story was published with seven illustrations by Gilbert Holiday in the Strand, and with eight illustrations in the US edition of the Strand. An extra illustration was needed for the story's publication in two parts. The story was included in the short story collection His Last Bow, which was published in the UK and the US in October 1917.

The original manuscript of the story is now part of the Berg Collection at the New York Public Library.

== Adaptations ==
=== Film and television ===
"The Devil's Foot" served as the basis for a 1921 short film starring Eille Norwood as Sherlock Holmes and Hubert Willis as Dr. Watson.

It was adapted as an episode of the 1965 television series Sherlock Holmes starring Douglas Wilmer (with Nigel Stock as Dr Watson and Patrick Troughton as Mortimer Tregennis).

The story was adapted as a 1988 episode of The Return of Sherlock Holmes starring Jeremy Brett as Holmes and Edward Hardwicke as Watson.

The first episode of the HBO Asia/Hulu series Miss Sherlock has a digestible pill-bomb called the Devil's Foot.

=== Radio and audio dramas ===
The story was dramatised by Edith Meiser as an episode of the American radio series The Adventures of Sherlock Holmes. The episode aired on 8 October 1931, with Richard Gordon as Sherlock Holmes and Leigh Lovell as Dr. Watson. Other episodes adapted from the story aired on 17 February 1935 (with Louis Hector as Holmes and Lovell as Watson) and 30 May 1936 (with Gordon as Holmes and Harry West as Watson).

Meiser also adapted the story as an episode of the American radio series The New Adventures of Sherlock Holmes that aired on 30 October 1939. Other dramatisations of the story were broadcast on 21 May 1943 and 10 July 1944. All three productions starred Basil Rathbone as Holmes and Nigel Bruce as Watson. In an adaptation that aired on 13 January 1947, Tom Conway played Holmes with Bruce as Watson. Max Ehrlich adapted the story as an episode that aired on 31 January 1949 (with John Stanley as Holmes and Wendell Holmes as Watson).

"The Devil's Foot" was adapted for the BBC Light Programme in 1962 by Michael Hardwick, as part of the 1952–1969 radio series starring Carleton Hobbs as Holmes and Norman Shelley as Watson.

"The Devil's Foot" was dramatised for BBC Radio 4 in 1994 by Bert Coules as part of the 1989–1998 radio series starring Clive Merrison as Holmes and Michael Williams as Watson, featuring Patrick Allen as Leon Sterndale, Geoffrey Beevers as Reverend Roundhay, and Sean Arnold as Mortimer Tregennis.

In 2014, the story was adapted for radio as an episode of The Classic Adventures of Sherlock Holmes, a series on the American radio show Imagination Theatre, with John Patrick Lowrie as Holmes and Lawrence Albert as Watson.
