= The Disappearance of Lady Frances Carfax =

- Short story by Arthur Conan Doyle
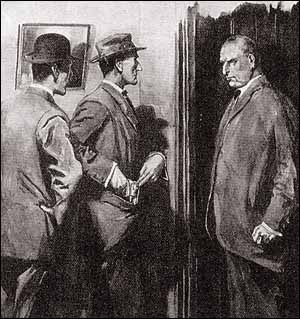
- 1911 illustration by Alec Ball in The Strand Magazine

Publication
- Publication date: December 1911

Chronology
- Series: His Last Bow
The Adventure of the Red Circle	The Adventure of the Dying Detective

"The Disappearance of Lady Frances Carfax" is one of the 56 Sherlock Holmes short stories written by Sir Arthur Conan Doyle. It is one of the eight stories in the cycle collected as His Last Bow (1917), and one of the few stories in which for much of the plot Watson must act alone and try his best with Holmes left in the background. It was first published in The Strand Magazine in the United Kingdom and The American Magazine in the United States in December 1911.

== Plot ==
Sherlock Holmes sends Dr. Watson to Lausanne to investigate Lady Frances Carfax's disappearance since he himself is too busy in London. Lady Frances is a lone, unwed woman denied a rich inheritance on account of her sex. She does, however, carry valuable jewels with her. It is also her habit to write to her old governess, Miss Dobney, every other week, but for the past five weeks, there has not been a word from her. She has left the Hôtel National in Lausanne for parts unknown. Her last two bank transactions were cheques, one to pay her hotel bill, and another for £50 (equivalent to £5,092 in 2025) to her maid, Miss Marie Devine.

In Switzerland, Watson finds out that Lady Frances stayed at the Hôtel National for several weeks, but then suddenly left in a hurry one day. Only one witness could suggest an explanation, one involving a big, bearded man who kept hounding her. It also emerges that Lady Frances's maid has left her employ, although it is not known why.

Watson finds out where Lady Frances went, and inquires at the Englischer Hof in Baden-Baden, Germany. She stayed there for a fortnight and met a couple described as Dr. Shlessinger, a convalescent missionary and biblical scholar from South America, and his wife. Lady Frances left with them three weeks ago for London, and nothing has been heard of her since. Watson also finds out that the big bearded man, the "savage", came about a week ago looking for her. Watson telegraphs Holmes about his progress, and oddly, Holmes wires back asking for a description of Dr. Shlessinger's left ear. Watson believes this to be Holmes's attempt at humour. Holmes is actually in earnest.

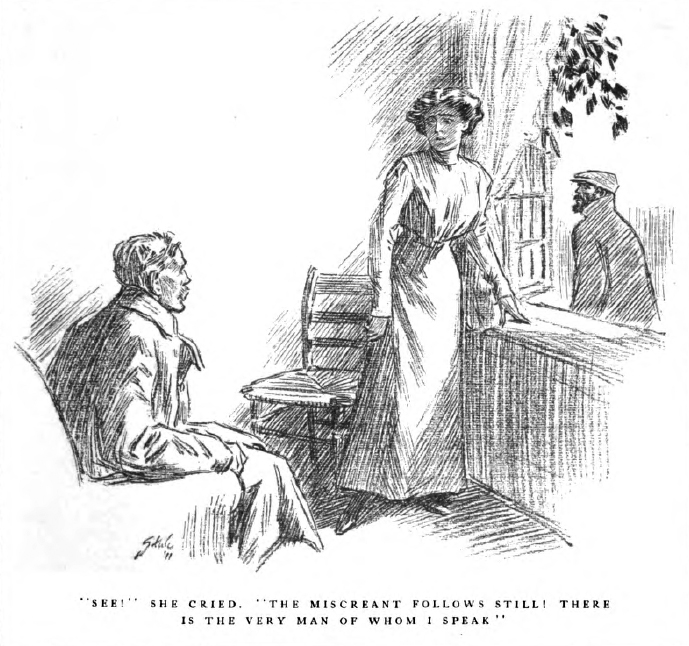
1911 illustration by Frederic Dorr Steele in The American Magazine

Watson visits Marie Devine, the former maid, in Montpellier, France, and it turns out that her upcoming wedding was why she left Lady Frances's employ. The £50 was a wedding present. She, too, believes that the bearded man was the reason that her former mistress left Lausanne. He was quite a rough man. During this interview, Marie sees the very man in question in the street. Watson rushes out and demands to know who he is and what he has done with Lady Frances. A fight ensues and Watson is nearly strangled. A French workman breaks the fight up with his cudgel and the bearded man withdraws. It then turns out that the workman is a disguised Holmes, who suggests that Watson accompany him back to London, and wryly observes that there is no blunder which Watson has failed to commit in this investigation.

Before leaving, however, Holmes interviews someone. It is the bearded man, the Honourable Philip Green, an old suitor of Lady Frances's. Yes, he is seeking Lady Frances, but he still wants to win her heart. As a younger man, despite being the son of a famous Admiral, he was not rich. Now that he has made his fortune in South Africa, he hopes she will see him differently, but he is still rather churlish and clearly Lady Frances is unwilling. Holmes recommends that he go back to London.

Once Holmes and Watson are back at 221B Baker Street, Holmes reads a telegram from Baden-Baden about Dr. Shlessinger's left ear—"jagged or torn". This confirms Holmes's suspicion that Dr. Shlessinger is in fact "Holy" Henry Peters, a vicious rascal from Australia (his earlobe was chewed away in a bar brawl). His so-called wife's real name is Annie Fraser. He beguiles young women by playing to their religious beliefs, as Shlessinger did with Lady Frances. This suggested his true identity to Holmes. Holmes believes that Lady Frances is in London, and quite possibly dead, or if not, confined in some way.

The search seems hopeless. The police follow known associates, Holmes places advertisements hoping to learn something, but nothing happens. Then, a pawnshop reports that someone matching Shlessinger's description has pawned a pendant very much like one owned by Lady Frances. He gave a false address, but this gives Holmes what he needs. He has Philip Green wait in the pawnshop, knowing that Henry Peters will want to pawn more jewellery. It takes a few days, but he is not disappointed. His wife shows up this time to pawn a matching pendant, and Green follows her, first to an undertaker's, where he finds Peters's wife discussing an "out of the ordinary" order, and later to an address in Brixton. He watches the house and sees some men deliver a coffin.

Holmes writes Green a note and sends him to the police to fetch a warrant. Meanwhile, Holmes and Watson go first to the undertaker's to ask about the funeral—it is at eight o'clock the next morning—and then to Brixton where they demand to see Dr. Shlessinger, or whatever he may call himself. Once inside, in the absence of a warrant, Holmes is obliged to resort to force to search Peters's house. He finds the coffin, and deep inside it is a small, emaciated, very old, dead woman. It is certainly not Lady Frances. Peters explains that it is his wife's old nurse. The police come and tell Holmes and Watson that they must leave. Peters gloats over Holmes's obvious humiliation.

The day ends in apparent failure. Nothing suspicious can be found about the household, no warrant arrives, and Holmes and Watson go back to Baker Street. Holmes does not sleep that night, preferring to go over the case in his mind.

Finally, early the next morning, Holmes realises what is going on. He and Watson rush to Brixton and make sure that the coffin is not removed from the house to go for burial. They unscrew the coffin lid and find Lady Frances inside, chloroformed. The Peterses, while dishonest enough to kidnap someone to steal her jewels, were too squeamish to commit murder directly. Watson manages to revive her, and the Peterses are found to have fled. It was the remark heard by Green at the undertaker's that helped Holmes deduce the truth. The woman there had been talking about an unusual coffin, and Holmes then also remembered that it was a big coffin for a very small woman, the idea being to obtain the necessary legal documents for the old woman, and then "legitimise" the burial of a coffin containing two bodies.

== Publication history ==
"The Disappearance of Lady Frances Carfax" was published in the UK in The Strand Magazine in December 1911, and in the US in The American Magazine in the same month. The story was published with five illustrations by Alec Ball in the Strand, and with five illustrations by Frederic Dorr Steele in The American Magazine. It was included in the short story collection His Last Bow, which was published in the UK and the US in October 1917.

== Adaptations ==
=== Film and television ===
- The story was used in the Stoll film series in 1923 featuring Eille Norwood.
- The story was also adapted in 1965, part of the thirteen-episode Sherlock Holmes series starring Douglas Wilmer as Holmes, Nigel Stock as Watson, Joss Ackland as Philip Green, Peter Madden as Inspector Lestrade and Ronald Radd as Dr Shlessinger.
- The Granada TV adaptation starring Jeremy Brett is not completely faithful to the original story. The precipitating action takes place not in Continental Europe but in the Lake District of England, where the holidaying Doctor often sees the Lady (and her stalker Philip Green) at the hotel before her disappearance.
- The story's name and basic theme of disappearance of a lady (in the adapted version the disappearance of a valuable guitar) was used as a basis for the TV series Elementary's episode "The Ballad of Lady Frances".

=== Radio and audio dramas ===
- "The Disappearance of Lady Frances Carfax" was dramatised by Edith Meiser as an episode of the American radio series The Adventures of Sherlock Holmes. The episode aired on 24 September 1931, with Richard Gordon as Sherlock Holmes and Leigh Lovell as Dr. Watson.
- A radio adaptation by Meiser also aired on the American radio series The New Adventures of Sherlock Holmes on 14 December 1941 (with Basil Rathbone as Holmes and Nigel Bruce as Watson). A dramatisation of the story aired on 26 February 1945 (again with Rathbone and Bruce), adapted by Denis Green. Another adaptation aired on 28 March 1948 (with John Stanley as Holmes and Alfred Shirley as Watson).
- The story was adapted for BBC radio in 1960 by Michael Hardwick, as part of the 1952–1969 radio series starring Carleton Hobbs as Holmes and Norman Shelley as Watson.
- A recording was released in 1971 which starred Robert Hardy as Holmes and Nigel Stock as Watson. It was dramatised and produced by Michael Hardwick (who adapted the 1960 BBC radio dramatisation of the same story) and Mollie Hardwick. It was one of a series of audio dramatisations of several Sherlock Holmes stories originally released as long playing records (one story to each side) on the Discourses label.
- An adaptation aired on BBC radio in 1978, starring Barry Foster as Holmes and David Buck as Watson.
- "The Disappearance of Lady Frances Carfax" was dramatised for BBC Radio 4 in 1994 by Peter Ling as part of the 1989–1998 radio series starring Clive Merrison as Holmes and Michael Williams as Watson, featuring Jack Klaff as the Hon. Philip Green and Stephen Thorne as Inspector Lestrade.
- In 2011, the story was adapted for radio as an episode of The Classic Adventures of Sherlock Holmes, a series on the American radio show Imagination Theatre, with John Patrick Lowrie as Holmes and Lawrence Albert as Watson.
- In 2025, the podcast Sherlock & Co. adapted the story in a three-episode adventure called "The Disappearance of Lady Frances Carfax", starring Harry Attwell as Sherlock Holmes, Paul Waggott as Dr. John Watson and Marta da Silva as Mariana "Mrs. Hudson" Ametxazurra.

=== Stage ===
- The story provided some of the source material for the 1923 play The Return of Sherlock Holmes.
