= Inspector Lestrade =

Fictional character from Sherlock Holmes

- Sherlock Holmes character
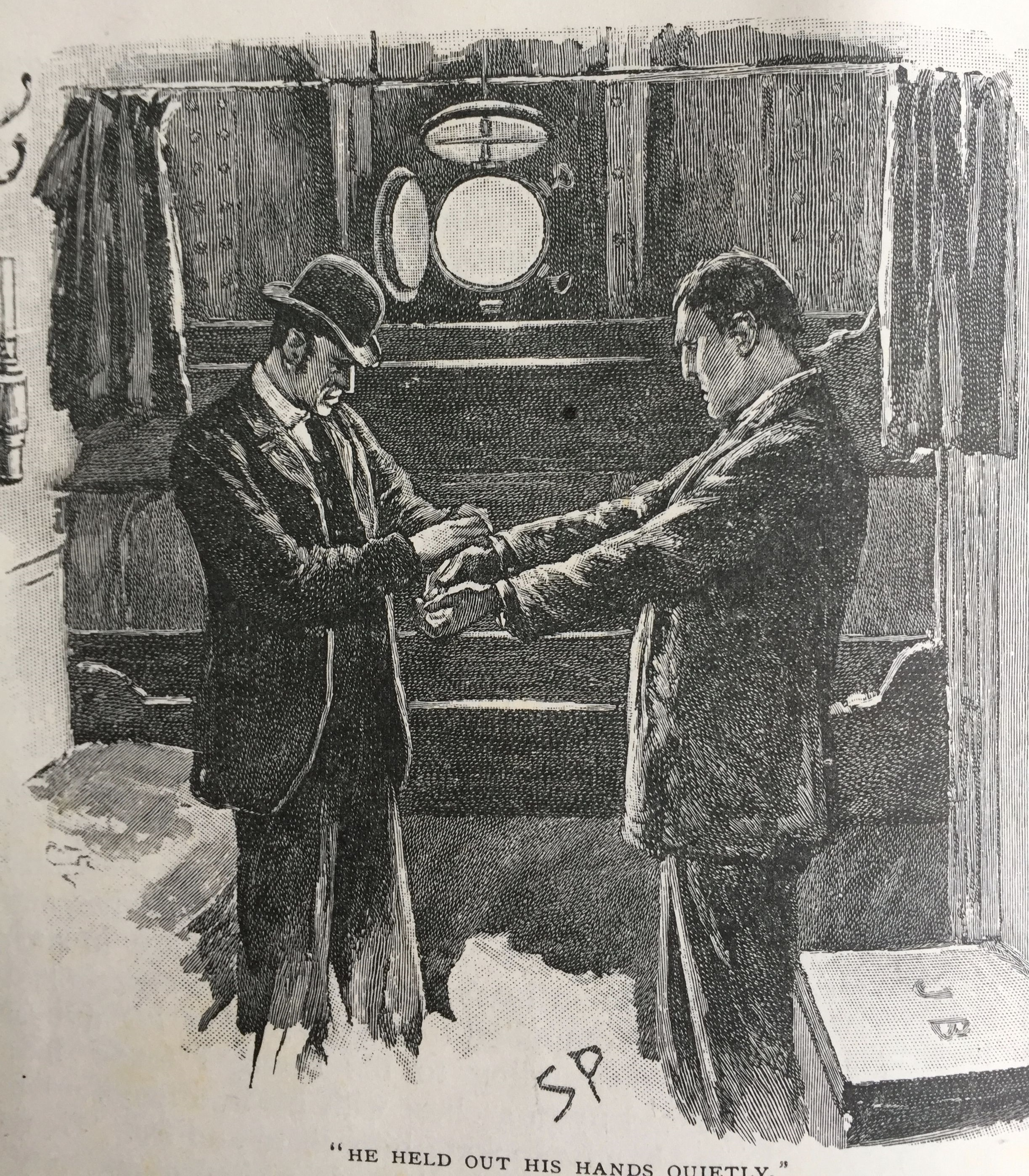
- Inspector Lestrade (left) arresting a suspect in "The Adventure of the Cardboard Box", illustrated by Sidney Paget
- First appearance: A Study in Scarlet (1887)
- Last appearance: "The Adventure of the Three Garridebs" (1924)
- Created by: Arthur Conan Doyle

Detective Inspector G. Lestrade ( /lɛˈstreɪd/ or /lɛˈstrɑːd/) is a fictional character appearing in the Sherlock Holmes stories written by Arthur Conan Doyle. Lestrade's first appearance was in the first Sherlock Holmes story, the 1887 novel A Study in Scarlet. His last appearance is in the 1924 short story "The Adventure of the Three Garridebs", which is included in the collection The Case-Book of Sherlock Holmes.

Lestrade is a determined but conventional Scotland Yard detective who consults Holmes on many cases, and is the most prominent police character in the series. Lestrade has been played by many actors in adaptations based on the Sherlock Holmes stories in film, television, and other media.

== Appearances in canon ==
Case	Date of publication	Location
A Study in Scarlet	1887	London
"The Boscombe Valley Mystery"	1891	Herefordshire
"The Adventure of the Noble Bachelor"	1892	London
"The Adventure of the Cardboard Box"	1893	Croydon
The Hound of the Baskervilles	1901	Devon
"The Adventure of the Empty House"	1903	London
"The Adventure of the Norwood Builder"	1903	South Norwood
"The Adventure of Charles Augustus Milverton"	1904	Hampstead, London
"The Adventure of the Six Napoleons"	1904	London
"The Adventure of the Second Stain"	1904	London
"The Adventure of the Bruce-Partington Plans"	1908	Woolwich
"The Disappearance of Lady Frances Carfax"	1911	Lausanne
"The Adventure of the Three Garridebs"	1924	Edgware Road, London

Lestrade is also mentioned in the novel The Sign of the Four (1890), though he doesn't appear in it.

== Fictional character biography ==
=== History and personality ===
Lestrade mentions his "twenty years' experience" in the police force in A Study in Scarlet. In the story, Holmes says Lestrade is "a well-known detective". It is observed by Holmes that Lestrade and another detective, Tobias Gregson, have an ongoing rivalry, and he identifies the two as "the pick of a bad lot. They are both quick and energetic, but conventional – shockingly so." Holmes regularly allows members of the police to take the credit for his deductions, including Lestrade in cases such as those in "The Adventure of the Empty House" and "The Adventure of the Norwood Builder". Lestrade is able to write in shorthand.

Lestrade is initially doubtful about Holmes's methods, and he suggests that Holmes is "too much inclined to be cocksure" in "The Adventure of the Norwood Builder". He is "indifferent and contemptuous" of Holmes's exploration in "The Boscombe Valley Mystery". Holmes is openly rude about Lestrade at times, such as in "The Boscombe Valley Mystery" when he tells Lestrade "demurely" that he is unskilled at handling facts, and refers to Lestrade as an imbecile. In The Sign of the Four, Holmes says that being out of his depth is Lestrade's normal state (along with Inspectors Gregson and Athelney Jones). However, Holmes is generally more positive about Lestrade in later stories. In "The Adventure of the Cardboard Box", Holmes remarks that Lestrade's tenacity "has brought him to the top at Scotland Yard". In The Hound of the Baskervilles, he says that Lestrade is "the best of the professionals" (meaning the professionals employed by Scotland Yard as opposed to himself), and in the same story, Watson observes "from the reverential way in which Lestrade gazed at my companion that he had learned a good deal since the days when they had first worked together".

By the time of the story "The Adventure of the Six Napoleons", Lestrade is a regular evening visitor at 221B Baker Street, and "his visits were welcome to Sherlock Holmes" according to Watson. In the same story, Lestrade reveals the high regard in which Holmes is now held by Scotland Yard: "We're not jealous of you at Scotland Yard. No, sir, we are very proud of you, and if you come down to-morrow, there's not a man, from the oldest inspector to the youngest constable, who wouldn't be glad to shake you by the hand". Holmes thanks Lestrade for this comment, and Watson notes that this is one of the few instances when Holmes is visibly moved. In "The Disappearance of Lady Frances Carfax", Holmes refers to him as "friend Lestrade". Lestrade's involvement in the investigation in "The Adventure of the Bruce-Partington Plans" suggests he has become one of Scotland Yard's most trusted detectives.

He was described by H. Paul Jeffers in the following words:

He is the most famous detective ever to walk the corridors of Scotland Yard, yet he existed only in the fertile imagination of a writer. He was Inspector Lestrade. We do not know his first name, only his initial: G. Although he appears thirteen times in the immortal adventures of Sherlock Holmes, nothing is known of the life outside the Yard of the detective whom Dr. Watson described unflatteringly as sallow, rat-faced, and dark-eyed and whom Holmes saw as quick and energetic but wholly conventional, lacking in imagination, and normally out of his depth – the best of a bad lot who had reached the top in the CID by bulldog tenacity.

=== Appearance and age ===
Inspector Lestrade is described as "a little sallow rat-faced, dark-eyed fellow" in A Study in Scarlet. In "The Boscombe Valley Mystery", Watson describes Lestrade as "a lean, ferret-like man, furtive and sly-looking", and also says, "In spite of the light brown dustcoat and leather-leggings which he wore in deference to his rustic surroundings, I had no difficulty in recognising Lestrade, of Scotland Yard." Watson states that Lestrade is "as wiry, as dapper, and as ferret-like as ever" in "The Adventure of the Cardboard Box". He is described as "a small, wiry bulldog of a man" in The Hound of the Baskervilles, and there is a description of him as having "bulldog features" in "The Adventure of the Second Stain". According to Holmes in "The Boscombe Valley Mystery", Lestrade's tracks can be identified due to the "inward twist" of his left foot.

His age is not given in the stories. Lestrade works with Holmes as early as A Study in Scarlet (which according to Leslie S. Klinger takes place in 1881) and continues to do so as late as "The Adventure of the Three Garridebs" (which is set in 1902). According to Klinger, L. S. Holstein used this information to conclude that Lestrade is ten to twelve years older than Holmes. Klinger estimated that Holmes was born in 1854; together with Holstein's theory, this would suggest that Lestrade may have been born between 1842 and 1844.

== Name origins and pronunciation ==
Doyle seems to have acquired Lestrade's name from a fellow student at the University of Edinburgh, Joseph Alexandre Lestrade, who was a Saint Lucian medical student. In "The Adventure of the Cardboard Box", Lestrade's first initial is revealed to be G. This initial may have been inspired by the Prefect of Police known only as "G—" in Edgar Allan Poe's short story "The Purloined Letter" (1845). Despite having an apparently French surname (there is a village named Lestrade-et-Thouels in France and "l'estrade" means "the raised platform" in French), Inspector Lestrade shows no overt French ties.

According to Everyman's English Pronouncing Dictionary, the name Lestrade can be pronounced either "Le'strayed" (rhyming with "trade") or "Le'strahd" /ləˈstrɑːd/ . In The New Annotated Sherlock Holmes, Leslie S. Klinger writes that there is no consensus among scholars on the pronunciation of "Lestrade". The original French pronunciation of the name would have been close to "Le'strahd". However, according to the book The Sherlock Holmes Miscellany by Roger Johnson and Jean Upton (Holmesian scholars and members of The Baker Street Irregulars), Arthur Conan Doyle's daughter Dame Jean Conan Doyle stated that her father pronounced the name with a long a sound (as "Le'strayed").

The pronunciation of Lestrade as "Le'strahd" has been used in multiple adaptations such as the 1939–1946 film series, the 2009 film Sherlock Holmes, and the television series Sherlock (2010–2017). The pronunciation of the name as "Le'strayed" has also been used in multiple canonical adaptations, including the 1931–1937 film series, the Granada television series (1984–1994), and the BBC radio series (1989–1998), as well as in some non-canonical works, including the 2020 film Enola Holmes.

== Depiction in derivatives and adaptations ==
=== Film ===
- Arthur Bell played Lestrade in several short films released in 1921 as part of the Stoll film series. Tom Beaumont played Lestrade in a 1923 short film in the series.
- Philip Hewland played Lestrade in The Sleeping Cardinal (1931) and The Missing Rembrandt (1932).
- Alan Mowbray played Lestrade in A Study in Scarlet (1933).
- Charles Mortimer played Lestrade in The Triumph of Sherlock Holmes (1935).
- Lestrade was played by John Turnball in Silver Blaze (1937).
- Dennis Hoey played Lestrade in six of the Sherlock Holmes films in the 1939–1946 series from Universal Pictures starring Basil Rathbone as Holmes. This version had the Yard man as a well-meaning fool patronised by the detective, whose help he greatly appreciated, rather in the manner of that series' version of Doctor Watson (Nigel Bruce). Lestrade is nonetheless a capable officer, and Holmes never questions his honesty or his willingness to solve a case.
- Frank Finlay played him twice, in A Study in Terror (1965) and Murder by Decree (1979), both focusing on non-canon stories with Holmes investigating the Jack the Ripper murders.
- Ronald Lacey played Lestrade in the 1983 film The Hound of the Baskervilles, starring Ian Richardson as Holmes. (Lacey would later play the Sholto Brothers in the Granada television production of The Sign of the Four with Jeremy Brett as Holmes.)
- Roger Ashton-Griffiths played Lestrade in Young Sherlock Holmes (1985); his taking credit for solving the mystery earns him a promotion from Detective to Inspector.
- Jeffrey Jones played Lestrade in Without a Clue (1988).
- Eddie Marsan plays him in Guy Ritchie's Warner Bros. adaptation Sherlock Holmes, alongside Robert Downey, Jr. and Jude Law (2009). This incarnation of Lestrade expresses a high level of irritation for Holmes, who in turn regards him with affectionate mockery. Lestrade nevertheless depends on Holmes, calling him to crime scenes and even allowing a fugitive Holmes to escape police custody. He briefly reprised the role in the 2011 sequel Sherlock Holmes: A Game of Shadows.
- Adeel Akhtar plays him in the 2020 Netflix film Enola Holmes and its 2022 sequel.

=== Television films ===
- Eustace Wyatt played Lestrade in the 1937 television production The Three Garridebs.
- Lestrade was played by Alan Caillou in The Hound of the Baskervilles (1972).
- Borislav Brondukov played him in all five television films of the Soviet series The Adventures of Sherlock Holmes and Dr. Watson (1979–1986) starring Vasily Livanov.
- Lestrade was played by Hubert Rees in The Hound of the Baskervilles (1982).
- Kenway Baker plays Lestrade in the television film Incident at Victoria Falls (1992), He makes a brief appearance in the film.
- Lestrade appears in two of the Hallmark adaptation series of television movies, The Royal Scandal (2001) and The Case of the Whitechapel Vampire (2002), and is portrayed by Julian Casey.
- William Huw portrays Lestrade in the 2010 direct-to-DVD Asylum film Sherlock Holmes. In this film, Lestrade does not seem to recognise Watson (Gareth David Lloyd), and often takes credit for Holmes's accomplishments. He becomes involved in the chase of a criminal mastermind dubbed "Spring-Heeled Jack", who uses several mechanical creatures to commit crimes across London.

=== Television series ===
- In the 1951 television series Sherlock Holmes, Lestrade was played by Bill Owen.
- Archie Duncan played Lestrade in the first American television adaptation of Holmes titled Sherlock Holmes in 1954–55. Much of the series was filmed in France. Duncan portrayed Lestrade in the same fashion as Dennis Hoey in the 1939–1946 films by Universal Pictures.
- Lestrade was played by two different actors in the 1965–1968 BBC series Sir Arthur Conan Doyle's Sherlock Holmes: Peter Madden opposite Douglas Wilmer as Holmes in the first series in 1965, and William Lucas opposite Peter Cushing as Holmes in the second series in 1968.
- Patrick Newell played him in the 1980 series Sherlock Holmes and Doctor Watson made in Poland. This had Geoffrey Whitehead as Holmes and Donald Pickering as Watson.
- Colin Jeavons played Lestrade in multiple episodes in the 1984–1994 Granada Television adaptation of the Sherlock Holmes stories, starting with "The Adventure of the Norwood Builder" in The Adventures of Sherlock Holmes. The character was portrayed as a capable, if slightly vain, career policeman with a prickly but ultimately affectionate relationship with Holmes – as evidenced in the dramatisation of the aforementioned "We're proud of you" scene. So familiar did Jeavons become in the part that when he was unavailable for "The Eligible Bachelor", Lestrade was replaced by another of ACD's Yarders, Inspector Montgomery. Lestrade's absence was explained as having gone to the Leamington Baths on vacation, and Holmes fumes that he hopes his wife was with him. This is an embellishment on canon, as Lestrade was never shown to be married or attached. In other episodes, Jeavons was given parts originally belonging to other detectives, such as "The Adventure of the Creeping Man" and extra scenes in "The Master Blackmailer" (their version of "The Adventure of Charles Augustus Milverton"). Lestrade was even mentioned off-screen in the scripts, emphasising his close relationship with 221B Baker Street. Jeavons' portrayal is considered the most faithful to the Canon. In Starring Sherlock Holmes David Stuart Davies wrote, "Lestrade was played with great panache throughout the Granada series by Colin Jeavons, who humanised and enhanced Doyle's sketchy portrait of the Inspector."
- John Colicos is credited as playing "Lestrade/Moriarty" in the 1989 episode of Alfred Hitchcock Presents titled "My Dear Watson". Late in the episode, it is revealed that "Lestrade" is actually Moriarty in disguise. The real Lestrade does not appear in person in the episode.
- In the TV show Sherlock Holmes in the 22nd Century (1999–2001) one of the main characters was Inspector Beth Lestrade, played by Akiko Morison. She is a descendant who is quite efficient in her own way and has inherited Doctor Watson's diaries.
- In the 2010–2017 BBC TV series Sherlock, Detective Inspector Greg Lestrade is played by Rupert Graves. In this series set in contemporary London, Lestrade is depicted as a competent detective who uses Sherlock Holmes as a consultant on difficult cases.
- Sean Pertwee plays Lestrade in the 2013 season two premiere of Elementary, where his first name is given as Gareth. His character recurs later in the season, as well.
- Mikhail Boyarsky played the role of Inspector Lestrade in the Russian TV adaptation, Sherlock Holmes (2013).
- In the 2014 NHK puppetry television series Sherlock Holmes, Lestrade is a tall, slender, and earnest blond schoolboy with the atmosphere of mod who lives in Cooper house of Beeton School. He often solves a trouble with Holmes for he is a member of life guidance committee. Though he and Holmes trust each other, Grimesby Roylott, who is in charge of the committee hates Holmes. In some cases, he requests Holmes to solve troubles. He is voiced by Daisuke Kishio. In the episode 6 of the series, he tells Holmes and Watson that his given name is Gordon.
- Rachel Hayward plays a gender swapped version of Lestrade in the CBS series Watson, appearing in the tenth episode of the first season in 2025. Introduced as a veteran Pittsburgh police homicide detective, Lestrade is initially sceptical of Watson and his crime solving abilities. By the end of the episode, she gives him her direct phone number should he need to speak to the police. He in turn suggests she call him first for any police related medical opinions. She becomes a recurring presence throughout the second season.
- In the 2026 Amazon Prime Video series Young Sherlock, Scott Reid plays a young Constable Lestrade.

=== Stage ===
- Paul Gill played Inspector Lestrade in the 1923 play The Return of Sherlock Holmes.
- Daniel Keyes played Lestrade in the 1965 musical Baker Street.
- In the 1989 premiere of Sherlock Holmes: The Musical, he was played by Roger Llewellyn.
- Inspector Lestrade is one of many characters played by a small number of actors in the play Baskerville: A Sherlock Holmes Mystery. In the 2015 premiere, he was played by Michael Glenn.

=== Audio ===
- Lestrade was played by several actors in The New Adventures of Sherlock Holmes including Frederick Worlock and Bernard Lenrow.
- In adaptations that were broadcast on the BBC Home Service and the BBC Light Programme, Lestrade was played by multiple actors including John Cazabon and Humphrey Morton.
- Nicholas Courtney portrayed Inspector Lestrade the 1981 radio play Sherlock Holmes vs. Dracula.
- Donald Gee played Inspector Giles Lestrade throughout most of the entire BBC Radio canon opposite Clive Merrison's Holmes beginning with the November 1989 broadcast of A Study in Scarlet and ending with the October 13th 1993 broadcast of "The Second Stain". Stephen Thorne took over the role beginning with the January 12th 1994 broadcast of "The Cardboard Box" and ending in the March 29th 1995 broadcast of "The Retired Colourman"; he returned to the role in the BBC Radio series The Further Adventures of Sherlock Holmes June 15, 2004 broadcast of "The Striking Success of Miss Franny Blossom", the January 2nd 2009 broadcast of "The Eye of Horus" and the January 16th 2009 broadcast of "The Ferrers Documents".
- Rick May voiced Lestrade in the American radio series The Further Adventures of Sherlock Holmes in episodes released from 1998 to 2020, and also portrayed Lestrade in the related radio series The Classic Adventures of Sherlock Holmes (2005–2016).
- James Fleet portrayed Lestrade as the lead character in the BBC Radio 4 drama series called The Rivals in 2011. Each episode had Lestrade team up with a different fictional Victorian detective, Sherlock Holmes' "Rivals" in the field. The series returned in 2013, but the role of Lestrade was recast and played by Tim Pigott-Smith due to James Fleet's unavailability. Fleet returned to play Lestrade when The Rivals was renewed for a third series in 2015 and a fourth series in 2016.
- In the podcast series Sherlock & Co. Lestrade is a woman named Gwen, and is Commissioner of the Police of the Metropolis. She is voiced by Sharon D. Clarke. Her niece Lily Lestrade (voiced by Jasmine Kerr) later appears in the adventure 'The Six Napoleons', revealing Sherlock has been a close acquaintance of Gwen for many years before the start of the series.

=== Video games ===
- Lestrade appears as a non-player character in the 1984 Sherlock computer adventure game.
- Lestrade is one of four playable characters in the 1986 video game adaptation of the board game 221B Baker Street.
- Inspector Lestrade appears in the Sherlock Holmes: Consulting Detective video games (1991–1993).
- Lestrade is a character in both The Lost Files of Sherlock Holmes: The Case of the Serrated Scalpel (1992) and its sequel The Lost Files of Sherlock Holmes: The Case of the Rose Tattoo (1996).
- Lestrade features in some of the titles in the Sherlock Holmes series by Frogwares such as Sherlock Holmes Versus Arsène Lupin (2007) and Sherlock Holmes: Crimes & Punishments (2014), being briefly playable in the former.
- A young female pickpocket based on Lestrade, her first name being "Gina", appears in the Ace Attorney spin-off, The Great Ace Attorney: Adventures (2015). She appears as a witness in the game's third case, and as a defendant falsely accused of murder in the game's fifth case. She joins the police force as a trainee and dubs herself "Inspector Lestrade" in the game's sequel, The Great Ace Attorney 2: Resolve.
- In the otome dating game and phone app "Guard Me, Sherlock!", Lestrade appears as "George" Lestrade, who is an inspector in the apparently "useless" Scotland Yard. There is a story route for him.
- Inspector Lestrade is a logic puzzle game online through Everett Kaser Software.
- Inspector Lestrade was featured as a character skin for First Officer for a Sherlock Crossover in the asymmetrical horror game called Identity V

=== Print ===
- In the 1979 book Sherlock Holmes: The Man and His World by H. R. F. Keating, Keating notes that despite Holmes' accusations of his lack of observational skills, he knows Holmes craves the outré and uses this to collect his interest in the case of "The Adventure of the Six Napoleons".
- The author M. J. Trow wrote a series of seventeen books using Lestrade as the central character, beginning with The Adventures of Inspector Lestrade in 1985. In these stories, Trow shows Lestrade to be a more than capable detective. He is given a first name, "Sholto", a young daughter whom he seldom sees, and a series of adventures set against a historical backdrop. In one book Lestrade meets G. K. Chesterton and in another he suffers a broken leg in a fall from the gangplank of the RMS Titanic.
- In the novel The Canary Trainer (1993), Sherlock Holmes uses "Inspector Lestrade" as an alias while investigating the phantom of the Paris Opera while incognito.
- Lestrade is a recurring character in the Moonstone Books versions of Sherlock Holmes adventures. His "We're proud of you" speech is adapted for a scene in Holmes' birthday in "Return of the Devil" (2004).
- He appears in the book series The Boy Sherlock Holmes (2007–2012) as the son of a ferret-faced inspector by the same name who dislikes Sherlock greatly.
- Holmes also used the alias Inspector Lestrade in the pastiche, The Counterfeit Detective (2016) by Stuart Douglas.
- Lestrade is briefly mentioned in The League of Extraordinary Gentlemen, Volume I.
- In the blaxploitation comic book series Watson and Holmes, Lestrade is re-imagined as Detective Leslie Straude, one of the series' few white recurring characters. Other than the gender swap and name change, she is very similar to the original character.

== In popular culture ==
Agatha Christie modelled her police detective character Inspector Japp, who appears in the stories featuring private detective Hercule Poirot, after Inspector Lestrade. Similar to Lestrade, Japp is described as "a little, sharp, dark, ferret-faced man" in Christie's 1920 novel The Mysterious Affair at Styles. In her autobiography, Christie stated that she wrote her early Poirot stories "in the Sherlock Holmes tradition—eccentric detective, stooge assistant, with a Lestrade-type Scotland Yard detective, Inspector Japp".

A search engine, the Inspector Lestrade, is used by MacIntosh, a "fast, lightweight meta searcher".

"The Inspector Lestrade Award" is a rising term among message boards for a person who is "almost correct". It has shown up on ZDNet and "Bad Astronomy and the Universe Today" forum.

The Peterson Pipes company has a Sherlock Holmes (Return) Series of handmade pipes with silverwork. Two Lestrade pipes are in the collection.

== Bibliography ==
- Davies, David Stuart (2001). Starring Sherlock Holmes. Titan Books.
