= The Adventure of the Red Circle =

Short story by Arthur Conan Doyle

- Short story by Arthur Conan Doyle
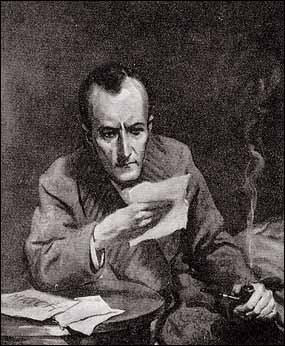
- 1911 illustration by H. M. Brock

Publication
- Publication date: 1911

Chronology
- Series: His Last Bow
The Adventure of the Devil's Foot	The Disappearance of Lady Frances Carfax

"The Adventure of the Red Circle" is one of the 56 Sherlock Holmes short stories written by Arthur Conan Doyle. It is included in the anthology His Last Bow.

== Plot ==
Mrs. Warren, a landlady, comes to 221B Baker Street with some questions about her new lodger, who is renting a room on the top floor of her house. A youngish, heavily bearded man, who spoke good but accented English, came to her and offered double her usual rent on the condition that he receive a key to the house and was not to be disturbed for any reason.

He went out the first night that he was there, and came back after midnight when the rest of the household had gone to bed. Since then, neither Mrs. Warren, her husband, nor their servant girl has seen him. He requests items via printed notes, and his meals are to be left on a chair outside the door.

After the landlady leaves, Holmes remarks to Dr. Watson that it seems likely that the person in Mrs. Warren's house is not the bearded man who made the arrangements. Holmes determines that messages are being sent to the lodger in the form of advertisements placed in a particular newspaper, which Mrs. Warren leaves by the door each morning.

Holmes and Watson go to Mrs. Warren's house and spy on the lodger, who they discover to be a young woman with a dark complexion. That evening, Holmes and Watson are on hand to see her confederate send messages by a waving candle.

Holmes and Watson meet Inspector Gregson and a Pinkerton detective from the United States named Leverton. They are lying in wait for Giuseppe Gorgiano, a vicious killer. Upon entering the room from which the signal originated, they discover Gorgiano lying on the floor in a pool of blood, dead from a stab wound to the throat. The lodger is revealed as Emilia Lucca, and her confederate is Gennaro, her husband. She confirms that the couple were seeking refuge from Gorgiano, who was out to kill Gennaro for betraying the Red Circle, a secret Italian criminal organization to which they had both belonged. Gennaro decided to leave the organization in spite of the threatened consequences. He and his wife fled Italy and went to New York to escape the Red Circle, but Gorgiano tracked Gennaro down and attacked while he was trying to signal Emilia. Gregson takes Emilia down to the police station, but comments that she and Gennaro will likely face no criminal charges over Gorgiano's death.

== Publication history ==
"The Adventure of the Red Circle" was first published in the UK in The Strand Magazine in March–April 1911, and in the United States in the US edition of the Strand in April–May 1911. The story was published with three illustrations by H. M. Brock and one by Joseph Simpson in The Strand Magazine, and with the same illustrations in the US edition of the Strand. It was included in the short story collection His Last Bow, which was published in the UK and the US in October 1917.

== Adaptations ==
=== Film and television ===
The story was adapted as a short silent film in 1922. It was one of the short films in the Sherlock Holmes film series by Stoll Pictures, and starred Eille Norwood as Sherlock Holmes and Hubert Willis as Dr. Watson. The story was also adapted for the 1994 Granada TV series.

=== Radio and audio dramas ===
"The Adventure of the Red Circle" was adapted by Edith Meiser as an episode of the American radio series The Adventures of Sherlock Holmes. The episode, which aired on 15 October 1931, featured Richard Gordon as Sherlock Holmes and Leigh Lovell as Dr. Watson. Another production of the story aired in February 1935, with Louis Hector as Holmes and Lovell as Watson.

The story was also adapted for the American radio series The New Adventures of Sherlock Holmes. The radio adaptation, starring Basil Rathbone and Nigel Bruce, was titled "Mrs. Warren's Lodger" and aired on 7 December 1941, the day of the Japanese attack on Pearl Harbor. The East Coast broadcast was interrupted by a radio announcement that President Franklin D. Roosevelt would be addressing the nation at noon the following day.

The story was adapted for BBC Radio 2 in 1969 by Michael Hardwick, as part of the 1952–1969 radio series starring Carleton Hobbs as Holmes and Norman Shelley as Watson.

"The Red Circle" was dramatised for BBC Radio 4 in 1994 by Peter Ling as part of the 1989–1998 radio series starring Clive Merrison as Holmes and Michael Williams as Watson, featuring Joan Sims as Mrs Warren.

In 2013, the story was adapted as an episode of The Classic Adventures of Sherlock Holmes, a series on the American radio show Imagination Theatre, with John Patrick Lowrie as Holmes and Lawrence Albert as Watson.

In 2024, the podcast Sherlock & Co. adapted the story in a four-episode adventure called "The Red Circle", starring Harry Attwell as Holmes, Paul Waggott as Watson and Marta da Silva as Mariana "Mrs. Hudson" Ametxazurra.
