= Jeremy Brett =

English actor (1933–1995)

- Brett in Hamlet (1960)
- Born: Peter Jeremy William Huggins; 3 November 1933; Berkswell, Warwickshire, England
- Died: 12 September 1995 (aged 61); Clapham, London, England
- Education: Eton College; Central School of Speech and Drama
- Occupation: Actor
- Years active: 1954–1995
- Spouses: Anna Massey (m. 1958; div. 1962) Joan Wilson (m. 1976; died 1985)
- Children: 1

Peter Jeremy William Huggins (3 November 1933 – 12 September 1995), known professionally as Jeremy Brett, was a British actor. He is best known for his portrayal of Sherlock Holmes from 1984 to 1994 in 41 episodes of the Granada TV series. He also played the smitten Freddy Eynsford-Hill in the 1964 Warner Bros. production of My Fair Lady. His career spanned stage, television and film, to Shakespeare and musical theatre.

== Early life ==
Jeremy Brett was born Peter Jeremy William Huggins at Berkswell Grange in Berkswell, then in Warwickshire. His birthdate was 3 November 1933, but it has also been stated as December 1933 or 1935, according to many sources. He was the son of Lieutenant Colonel Henry William Huggins, DSO, MC, DL (1891–1965), an Army officer, and Elizabeth Edith Cadbury (née Butler; 1903–1959), of the confectionery dynasty.

He had three older brothers: John Henry (1924–1999), Michael William (1927–2000) and Patrick William (1929–2017). The actor Martin Clunes is his nephew. (Note: According to other sources, Clunes is either his cousin or 2nd cousin, once removed.) Educated at Eton College, he claimed to have been an "academic disaster", attributing his learning difficulties to dyslexia. Brett belonged to the Woodmen of Arden, an archery club established in 1785. His father and brothers were also members.

Eventually Brett developed precisely honed diction but was born with rhotacism, a speech impediment that prevented him from pronouncing the "R" sound correctly. He underwent corrective surgery as a teenager and followed it with years of practising.

While at Eton, he excelled at singing and was a member of the college choir. He was trained by Elsie Fogerty at the Central School of Speech and Drama, then based at the Royal Albert Hall in London, graduating in 1954, but his father had demanded that he change his name for the sake of family honour, so he took his stage name from the label of his first suit, "Brett & Co."

In 1959 his mother was killed in a car crash in the Welsh mountains. This had a tremendous effect on Brett. Later in life, he spoke about the accident, its impact on him and consequently his performance of Hamlet in 1961; “my mother had been killed savagely in a car accident in 1959, and I was very angry about that, because my son, when she was killed, was only three months old. There was anger—it was interesting ... there was anger in me. And I think that came through. I felt cheated—I felt my mother had been cheated—the rage of that came through." He could not believe the circumstances and channelled his anger into his performance.

== Career ==
=== Stage and screen ===
Brett in 1953

Brett made his professional acting debut in rep at the Library Theatre in Manchester in 1954, and his London stage debut with the Old Vic company in Troilus and Cressida in 1956. He made his first appearance in a major film with War and Peace (1956), which starred Audrey Hepburn.

Also in 1956, he appeared on Broadway as the Duke of Aumerle in Richard II. In 1959, Brett had a singing role as the romantic lead of Archie Forsyth in the West End musical Marigold. Also in 1959, he played the part of Hamlet; however, on reflection, in a BBC2 television documentary Playing the Dane, Brett later said that "I don't think I was very good as Hamlet. I think I was too young. I was too young intellectually. I was too young philosophically. I was Byronic. I was very handsome. I had qualities, but I'd much rather see other people's [version]. I wasn't convinced by me". The respected theatre critic Harold Hobson wrote of Brett's portrayal that "the incestuous bed was the centre of his performance". He played many classical roles on stage, including about a dozen Shakespearean parts at the Old Vic, in New York and four while Brett was a member of the National Theatre Company from 1967 to 1970.

From the early 1960s, Brett was often on British television. He starred in several serials, including as d'Artagnan in an adaptation of The Three Musketeers (1966). His highest profile film appearance was as Freddy Eynsford-Hill in My Fair Lady (1964), again with Audrey Hepburn. Although Brett sang well, as he later demonstrated when he played Danilo in a BBC Television broadcast of The Merry Widow (Christmas Day 1968), his singing in My Fair Lady was dubbed by Bill Shirley. Around this time, Brett was considered to replace Sean Connery as James Bond (007), but turned the part down, feeling that playing 007 would harm his career. George Lazenby was subsequently cast instead.

Some of his appearances were in classical comedic roles, such as Captain Absolute in a television version of The Rivals (1970) and Bassanio in William Shakespeare's The Merchant of Venice (1970) in a National Theatre Company production directed by Jonathan Miller, which also featured Laurence Olivier (as Shylock) and Joan Plowright (as Portia). This was adapted for television in 1973 with the same three leads.

Brett joked that, as an actor, he was rarely allowed into the 20th century and never into the present day. He did, though, appear in a few contemporary guest roles, in a couple of the ITC series such as The Baron (1967) and The Champions (1969), wherein he was cast as swarthy, smooth villains. Brett also appeared in The Incredible Hulk ("Of Guilt, Models and Murder", 1977) and starred as Maxim in the 1979 adaptation of Daphne du Maurier's Rebecca opposite Joanna David.

Jeremy Brett's final, posthumous film appearance was an uncredited bit part as the artist's father in Moll Flanders, a 1996 Hollywood feature film starring Robin Wright Penn in the title role. The film, not to be confused with the 1996 ITV adaptation starring Alex Kingston, was released nearly a year after Brett's death.

=== Sherlock Holmes ===
Brett as Sherlock Holmes

Although Brett appeared in many different roles during his 40-year career, he is best remembered for his performance as Sherlock Holmes in The Adventures of Sherlock Holmes, a series of Granada Television films made between 1984 and 1994. These were adapted by John Hawkesworth and other writers from the original stories by Sir Arthur Conan Doyle. Even though he reportedly feared being typecast, Brett appeared in all 41 episodes of the Granada series, plus two television films alongside David Burke and, latterly, Edward Hardwicke as Doctor Watson. Jeremy Brett and Edward Hardwicke appeared on stage in 1988 and 1989 in The Secret of Sherlock Holmes directed by Patrick Garland.

After taking on the demanding role ("Holmes is the hardest part I have ever played—harder than Hamlet or Macbeth") Brett made few other acting appearances, and he is now widely considered to be the definitive Holmes of his era, just as Basil Rathbone was at the beginning of the 1940s and William Gillette during the first third of the 20th century. Brett had previously played Doctor Watson on stage opposite Charlton Heston as Holmes in the 1980 Los Angeles production of The Crucifer of Blood, making him one of only a small number of actors to play both Holmes and Watson professionally. (Note: Eyles mentions three other actors who played both Holmes and Watson: Reginald Owen (who played Watson in a 1932 film and Holmes in a 1933 film), Howard Marion-Crawford (who played Holmes in a radio production and Watson in a television series), and Carleton Hobbs (who portrayed both roles on the radio). Other actors who played both roles include Patrick Macnee, Edward Woodward, Kenneth Rivington, H. Lawrence Leyton, and John Bell.)

In February 1982, Brett was approached by Granada Television to play Holmes. The idea was to make a totally authentic and faithful adaptation of the character's best cases. Eventually Brett accepted the role; he wanted to be the best Sherlock Holmes the world had ever seen. He conducted extensive research on the great detective and Sir Arthur Conan Doyle himself, and was very attentive to discrepancies between the scripts he had been given and Conan Doyle's original stories.

One of Brett's dearest possessions on the set was his 77-page "Baker Street File" on everything from Holmes' mannerisms to his eating and drinking habits. Brett once explained that "some actors are becomers—they try to become their characters. When it works, the actor is like a sponge, squeezing himself dry to remove his own personality, then absorbing the character's like a liquid". Brett was focused on bringing more passion to the role of Holmes. He introduced Holmes's rather eccentric hand gestures and short violent laughter. He would hurl himself on the ground just to look for a footprint, "he would leap over the furniture or jump onto the parapet of a bridge with no regard for his personal safety".

Holmes's obsessive and depressive personality fascinated and frightened Brett. In many ways Holmes's personality resembled the actor's own, with outbursts of passionate energy followed by periods of lethargy. It became difficult for him to let go of Holmes after work. He had always been told that the only way for an actor to stay sane was for him to leave his part behind at the end of the day, but Brett started dreaming about Holmes, and the dreams turned into nightmares. Brett began to refer to Holmes as "You Know Who" or simply "HIM". Terry Manners' 2001 book on Brett in the role provides some of Brett's thoughts:

"Watson describes You Know Who as a mind without a heart, which is hard to play. Hard to become. So what I have done is invent an inner life." Brett invented an imaginary life of Holmes to fill the hollowness of Holmes's "missing heart", his empty emotional life. He imagined: "... what You Know Who's nanny looked like. She was covered in starch. I don't think he saw his mother until he was about eight years old ..." etc.

While the other actors disappeared to the canteen for lunch, Brett would sit alone on the set reading the script, looking at every nuance, reading Holmes in the weekends and on his holidays. Brett stated, "Some actors fear if they play Sherlock Holmes for a very long run the character will steal their soul, leave no corner for the original inhabitant", but also that, "Holmes has become the dark side of the moon for me. He is moody and solitary and underneath I am really sociable and gregarious. It has all got too dangerous".

A theatrical adaptation, The Secret of Sherlock Holmes, by Brett's friend, playwright Jeremy Paul, ran at Wyndham's Theatre in London's West End with Brett and Edward Hardwicke during 1988 and 1989; the production subsequently toured.

Brett's performance is regarded by many critics to have been their favourite rendition of Sherlock Holmes.

=== Sound recordings ===
Brett can be heard in the Caedmon Records productions of Saint Joan, Troilus and Cressida, The Duchess of Malfi, Love's Labour's Lost, and Jean Cocteau's The Infernal Machine.

== Awards ==
Jeremy Brett received the Légion d'honneur in 1994 for his role of Sherlock Holmes at a celebration marking ten years since the series aired. He received it in Manchester where the series was filmed.

== Personal life ==
On 24 May 1958, Brett married the actress Anna Massey (daughter of actor Raymond Massey). Their son, David Huggins, born in 1959, is a British cartoonist, illustrator, and novelist. Brett and Massey divorced on 22 November 1962 after she claimed that he had left her for a man. From 1969 to 1976, Brett was in a romantic relationship with the actor Gary Bond, who died exactly one month after Brett. In the late 1970s, Brett was involved with Paul Shenar. In 1976, Brett married Joan Sullivan Wilson, who died of cancer in July 1985. Brett never disclosed his sexuality.

In the latter part of 1986, Brett exhibited wild mood swings that alarmed his family and friends, who persuaded him to seek diagnosis and treatment for manic depression, later known as bipolar disorder. Brett was prescribed lithium tablets to fight this condition. He suspected that he would never be cured, and would have to live with his malady, look for the signs of his disorder, and then deal with it. He wanted to return to work and to play Holmes again.

The first episode to be produced after his discharge was a two-hour adaptation of The Sign of Four in 1987. From then on, the changes in Brett's appearance and behaviour slowly became more noticeable as the series developed. He developed fluid retention and put on weight. The prescription drugs also slowed him down. According to Edward Hardwicke, Brett smoked up to 60 cigarettes a day, which "didn't help his health". He also had heart troubles and his heart was twice the normal size; he had difficulties breathing and needed an oxygen mask on the set. "But, darlings, the show must go on", was his only comment.

During the final decade of his life, Brett was treated in hospital several times for his mental illness, and his health and appearance visibly deteriorated by the time he completed the later episodes of the Sherlock Holmes series. At one point, during the final series, Brett collapsed on set. During his last years, he discussed the illness candidly, encouraging people to recognise its symptoms and seek help.. On 23 August 1995 Jeremy Brett recorded an edition of The Week's Good Cause for BBC Radio 4 in which he spoke openly about "manic depression". The programme was broadcast on Sunday, 3 September 1995, only days before his death.

== Death ==
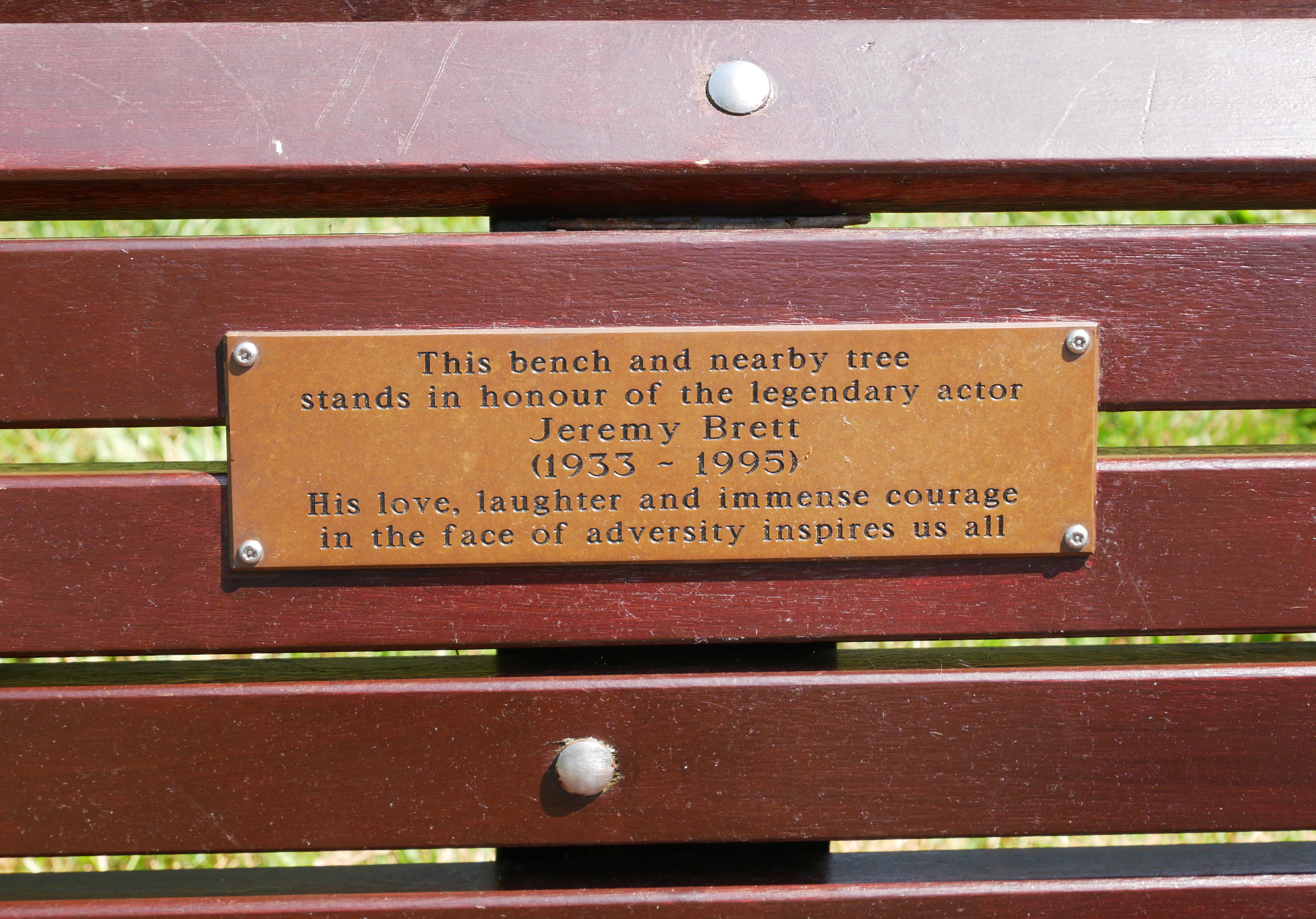
Plaque on a memorial bench for Brett on Clapham Common.

Brett died from heart failure on 12 September 1995 at his home in Clapham, at age 61. His heart valves had been scarred by rheumatic fever contracted as a child, and on top of this he had been a heavy smoker throughout his life. His body was cremated.

One of his elder brothers, John, who was a minister, spoke at Jeremy's memorial service on 29 November 1995. Jeremy was John's youngest brother.

Mel Gussow wrote in an obituary for The New York Times, "Mr. Brett was regarded as the quintessential Holmes: breathtakingly analytical, given to outrageous disguises and the blackest moods and relentless in his enthusiasm for solving the most intricate crimes."

A memorial tree to the actor was planted on Clapham Common – near where Brett had lived for many years – on 30 March 2007.

== Work ==
=== Stage ===
Year	Name	Role	Place
1956	King Richard II	Duke of Aumerle	Winter Garden Theatre
1956	Macbeth	Malcolm	Winter Garden Theatre
1956	Romeo and Juliet	Paris	Winter Garden Theatre
1957	Troilus and Cressida	Troilus	Winter Garden Theatre
1958	Candida	Eugene Marchbanks	Oxford Playhouse
1958	Variation on a Theme	Ron	Globe Theatre
1959	The Edwardians	Sebastian	Savile Theatre
1960	Johnny the Priest	Rev. Highfield	Princes Theatre
1961	Hamlet	Hamlet	Oxford Playhouse/Royal Strand Theatre
1961	The Changeling	Anselmo	Royal Court Theatre
1961	The Kitchen	Peter the Cook	Royal Court Theatre
1963	The Workhouse Donkey	Maurice Sweetman	Chichester Festival Theatre
1964	The Deputy	Father Riccardo Fontana, S.J.	Brooks Atkinson Theatre
1965	A Measure of Cruelty	Gideon	Birmingham Repertory Theatre
1965	Much Ado About Nothing	Claudio	The Old Vic
1965	A Month in the Country	Beliaev	Cambridge Theatre
1967	As You Like It	Orlando	Royal National Theatre
1968	Tartuffe	Valere	The Old Vic
1968	Edward II	Kent	The Old Vic
1968	Love's Labour's Lost	Berowne	The Old Vic
1969	MacRune's Guevara	Che Guevara	Jeanetta Cochrane Theatre
1969	A Talent to Amuse	Himself	Phoenix Theatre
1970	Hedda Gabler	George Tesman	Cambridge Theatre
1970	The Merchant of Venice	Bassanio	The Old Vic
1971	A Voyage Around My Father	Son	Haymarket Theatre
1972	Traveller Without Luggage	Gaston	Thorndike Theatre
1972	Rosmersholm	John Rosmer	Greenwich Theatre
1973	Design for Living	Otto	Phoenix Theatre
1978	Dracula	Count Dracula	various; Broadway production tour
1980	The Crucifer of Blood	Dr. Watson	Ahmanson Theatre
1981	Noël	Noël Coward	Goodspeed Opera House
1985	Aren't We All?	Hon. William Tatham	Brooks Atkinson Theatre
1988	The Secret of Sherlock Holmes	Sherlock Holmes	Wyndham's Theatre

=== Film ===
Year	Title	Role	Notes
1954	Svengali	Pierre	Uncredited
1956	War and Peace	Nikolai Rostov	
1962	The Wild and the Willing	Andrew Gilby	
1963	The Very Edge	Mullen - The Intruder	
1963	Girl in the Headlines	Jordan Barker	
1964	My Fair Lady	Freddy Eynsford-Hill	
1964	Act of Reprisal	Harvey Freeman	
1971	Nicholas and Alexandra		Uncredited
1978	The Medusa Touch	Edward Parrish	
1981	The Secret of Seagull Island	David Malcolm	
1995	Mad Dogs and Englishmen	Tony Vernon-Smith	
1996	Moll Flanders	Artist's Father	Posthumous release

=== Television ===
==== Television films ====
Year	Name	Role	Notes
1957	Meet me by Moonlight	Roderick	
1961	The Picture of Dorian Gray	Dorian Gray	
1962	The Ghost Sonata	The Student	
1962	Dinner with the Family	Jacques	
1966	Chopin and George Sand - The Creative Years	Chopin	
1968	The Merry Widow	Count Danilo Danilovitch	
1969	An Ideal Husband	Viscount Goring	
1970	The Rivals	Captain Jack Absolute	
1973	The Merchant of Venice	Bassanio	
1974	Affairs of the Heart	Captain Yule	
1974	Jennie: Lady Randolph Churchill	Count Karel Kinsky	2 episodes
1974	Haunted: The Ferryman	Sheridan Owen	
1975	The Prodigal Daughter	Father Daley	
1975	Love's Labour's Lost	Berowne	
1975	The School for Scandal	Joseph Surface	
1976	The Picture of Dorian Gray	Basil Hallward	
1979	Rebecca	Maximillian "Maxim" de Winter	
1981	Madame X	Dr. Terrence Keith	
1981	Macbeth	Macbeth	
1981	The Good Soldier	Edward Ashburnham	
1982	The Barretts of Wimpole Street	Robert Browning	
1984	Morte d'Arthur	King Arthur	
1985	Florence Nightingale	William Nightingale	
1985	Deceptions	Bryan Foxworth	
1987	The Sign of Four	Sherlock Holmes	
1988	The Hound of the Baskervilles	Sherlock Holmes	

==== Sherlock Holmes ====
- 1984: The Adventures of Sherlock Holmes

A Scandal in Bohemia
The Dancing Men
The Naval Treaty
The Solitary Cyclist
The Crooked Man
The Speckled Band
The Blue Carbuncle

- 1985: The Adventures of Sherlock Holmes

The Copper Beeches
The Greek Interpreter
The Norwood Builder
The Resident Patient
The Red Headed League
The Final Problem

- 1986: The Return of Sherlock Holmes

The Empty House
The Priory School
The Second Stain
The Musgrave Ritual
The Abbey Grange
The Man with the Twisted Lip
The Six Napoleons

- 1988: The Return of Sherlock Holmes

The Devil's Foot
Silver Blaze
Wisteria Lodge
The Bruce Partington Plans

- 1987—1988: Masterpiece Mystery

The Return of Sherlock Holmes: The Hound of the Baskervilles
The Return of Sherlock Holmes: The Sign of Four

- 1992: ITV Telethon [Sherlock Holmes]
- 1991—1993: The Case-Book of Sherlock Holmes

1991: The Disappearance of Lady Frances Carfax
1991: The Problem of Thor Bridge
1991: The Adventure of Shoscombe Old Place
1991: The Boscombe Valley Mystery
1991: The Illustrious Client
1991: The Adventure of the Creeping Man
1992: The Master Blackmailer
1993: The Last Vampyre
1993: The Eligible Bachelor

- 1994: The Memoirs of Sherlock Holmes

The Three Gables
The Dying Detective
The Golden Pince-Nez
The Red Circle
The Mazarin Stone
The Cardboard Box

=== Other ===
- 1957: Producers' Showcase [Paris]

Romeo and Juliet

- 1960: Saturday Playhouse [Nigel Lorraine]

The Guinea Pig

- 1961: Beauty and the Beast [The Prince]

2 episodes

- 1961: BBC Sunday-Night Play [Julian Bennett]

A Kind of Strength

- 1962: The Bacchae [Dionysus]
- 1960—1963: ITV Play of the Week

1960: Tess [Angel Clare]
1962: The Typewriter [Pascal / Maxime]
1963: Three Roads to Rome [Tonino]

- 1965: Knock on Any Door [David]

Close Season

- 1966: Mystery and Imagination [Sir John Maltravers]

The Lost Stradivarius

- 1966—1967: The Three Musketeers [D'Artagnan]

1966: Branded
1966: At Night All Cats Are Grey
1967: The Cardina
1967: Assassin
1967: Walk to the Scaffold

- 1967: The Baron

The Seven Eyes of Night [Jeff Walker]

- 1961—1967: Armchair Theatre

1961: The Picture of Dorian Gray [Dorian Gray]
1964: Something to Declare [Plinio Ceccho]
1967: Quite an Ordinary Knife [Gino]

- 1967: Kenilworth [Edmund Tressilian]

The Sparrow's Lure
The Black Arts
The Tide Turns
The Wrath of Lions

- 1966—1967: Theatre 625

1966: The Queen & the Welshman [Villiers]
1967: The Magicians: The Incantation of Casanova [Giacomo Casanova]

- 1968: For Amusement Only [Henry]

Time for the Funny Walk

- 1969: The Champions [The Bey]

Desert Journey

- 1970: Solo [Byron]
- 1973: The Protectors [Kahan]

With a Little Help from My Friends

- 1973: Country Matters [Captain Blaine]

An Aspidistra in Babylon

- 1973: A Picture of Katherine Mansfield [John Middleton Murry]

4 episodes

- 1974: Jennie: Lady Randolph Churchill [Count Karel Kinsky]

Recovery
Triumph and Tragedy

- 1974: Affairs of the Heart [Captain Yule]
- 1974: The Wide World of Mystery [Peter Tower]

One Deadly Owner

- 1975: A Legacy [Eduard Merz]

4 episodes

- 1975: Ten from the Twenties [Willie Edwardes]
- 1975: Twiggy - 15 October episode
- 1976: Piccadilly Circus [Host]
- 1977: Supernatural [Mr. Nightingale]
- 1977: Young Dan'l Boone [Langford]
- 1978: The Incredible Hulk [James Joslin]
- 1979: Rebecca [Maxim de Winter]

4 episodes

- 1979: Hart to Hart [Mason Parks]
- 1980: Galactica 1980 [Xaviar / Lieutenant Nash]
- 1981: Seagull Island [David Malcolm]

4 episodes

- 1970—1982: BBC Play of the Month

1969: An Ideal Husband [Lord Goring]
1970: The Rivals [Captain Jack Absolute]
1975: The School for Scandal [Joseph Surface]
1975: Love's Labour's Lost [Berowne]
1976: The Picture of Dorian Gray [Basil Hallward]
1982: On Approval [George, Duke of Bristol]

- 1983: Number 10 [William Pitt the Younger]
- 1984: The Love Boat [Ernest Finley]

== See also ==
- List of actors who have played Sherlock Holmes
- List of Sherlock Holmes episodes starring Jeremy Brett, including brief episode summaries
