= Séamus =

- Pronunciation: English: /ˈʃeɪməs/ SHAY-məs; Irish: [ˈʃeːmˠəsˠ]
- Gender: Male

Origin
- Origin: Goidelic languages
- Meaning: "He may/will/shall follow/heed/seize by the heel/watch/guard/protect", "Supplanter/Assailant", "May God protect"
- Region of origin: Ireland, Scotland

Other names
- Related names: Hamish, James, Jamie, Seumas.

Séamus (Irish pronunciation: [ˈʃeːmˠəsˠ]) is an Irish male given name, of Hebrew origin via Latin. It is the Irish equivalent of the name James. The name James is the English New Testament variant for the Hebrew name Jacob. It entered the Irish and Scottish Gaelic languages from the French variation of the late Latin name for Jacob, Iacomus; a dialect variant of Iacobus, from the New Testament Greek Ἰάκωβος (Iákōvos), and ultimately from Hebrew word יעקב (Yaʻaqov), i.e. Jacob. The name comes either from the Hebrew root עקב ʿqb meaning "to follow, to be behind" but also "to supplant, circumvent, assail, overreach", or from the word for "heel", עֲקֵב ʿaqeb. It can also be taken to mean "may [God] protect". The traditional explanation for the name follows that it was given to the patriarch Jacob when he was born, as he was grasping his twin brother Esau's heel, though this is a folk etymology.

Other variant spellings in Irish include Séamas, Seumas and Seumus. It has also been anglicised as Shaymus, Seamus, Seamas, Sheamus and Shamus. Diminutives include Séimí, Séimín and Séamaisín.

== Derogatory stereotype in the United States ==
In the United States, the word "Shamus" is an Anglicized spelling of Séamus and was a derogatory slang for a persisting stereotype of an Irish-American police officer — especially detectives and private investigators — continuing through to today, but at a much lesser degree. This arose during the 19th century — peaking between 1845 and 1852 at almost two million during the Great Famine (Irish: An Gorta Mór) — as more than 4½ million Irish immigrated to America. The great preponderance of Irish immigrants found employment in the police departments, fire departments, and other public services of the major cities, largely in the northeast of the US and around the Great Lakes, and have been considerably over-represented in the New York police since then.

== Given name ==
- Seamus, Stuart / Stewart Kings of Scotland from James I to James VI
- Séamus Bannon (1927–1990), Irish retired sportsman
- Séamus Barron (born 1945), Irish retired hurler
- Séamus Begley (1949–2023), Irish accordion player and singer
- Seamus Blackley (born 1967 or 1968), American physicist, talent agent, and co-creator of the original Xbox console
- Seamus Blake (born 1970), tenor saxophonist
- Seamus Bohan, Irish independent politician
- Seamus Bonner (1948–2012), Irish sportsperson
- Séamus Bourke (hurler) (born 1957), Irish retired hurler
- Seamus Boxley (born 1982), former American professional basketball player
- Séamus Brennan (1948–2008), Irish politician and Minister for Arts, Sport & Tourism
- Séamus Burke (1893–1967), Irish politician
- Séamus Butler (born 1980), Irish sportsperson
- Seamus Cahill, Irish born greyhound trainer
- Séamus Callanan (born 1988), Irish hurler
- Seamus Carey, American philosopher and academic
- Séamus Casey (hurler) (born 1997), Irish hurler
- Seamus Casey (ice hockey) (born 2004), American ice hockey player
- Seamus Clancy, Gaelic footballer
- Seamus Clandillon (1878–1944), Irish musician and civil servant
- Séamus Cleere, (born 1940), Irish retired hurler
- Seamus Close (1947–2019), Northern Irish politician
- Séamus Coen (born 1958), Irish retired hurler
- Seamus Coffey, Irish economist and media contributor
- Séamus Coleman (born 1988), Irish footballer
- Seamus Conley (born 1976), American artist
- Seamus Conneely (born 1988), English footballer
- Seamus Costello (1939–1977), Irish activist
- Séamus Coughlan (1953–2013), Irish Gaelic footballer
- Séamus Cullimore (born 1954), Irish politician
- Séamus Cullinane (1933–2002), Irish hurler
- Séamus Cunningham (born 1942), Irish Catholic Bishop of Hexham and Newcastle
- Seamus Daly, Irish republican
- Séamus Darby (born 1950), Irish former Gaelic football player
- Seamus Davey-Fitzpatrick (born 1998), American actor
- Séamus de Brún (1911–2003), Irish senator and Irish-language promoter
- Seamus Deakin (1874–1952), Irish nationalist
- Seamus Deane (1940–2021), Irish poet, novelist, critic and historian
- Seamus Dever (born 1976), American actor
- Séamus Dolan (1914–2010), Irish politician
- Seamus Donnelly (footballer) (born 1971), Irish retired footballer
- Séamus Downey (born 1960), former cyclist from Northern Ireland
- Seamus Downey, Irish Gaelic footballer
- Séamus Doyle (1885–1971), Irish politician
- Seamus Dunne (1930–2016), Irish professional footballer
- Séamus Durack (born 1951), Irish former hurler and manager
- Séamus Dwyer (1886–1922), Irish politician
- Séamus Egan (judge) (1923–2004), Irish judge and barrister
- Séamus Egan (born 1969), Irish musician
- Seamus Elliott (1934–1971), Irish bicycle racer
- Séamus Ennis (1919–1982), Irish musician, singer and music collector
- Seamus Finnegan (born 1949), Northern Irish playwright
- Séamus Fitzgerald (1896–1972), Irish politician
- Séamus Flanagan (born 1997), Irish hurler
- Seamus Fogarty, Irish singer-songwriter
- Séamus Freeman (1944-2022), Irish Roman Catholic Bishop
- Séamus Gardiner (1894–1976), Irish president of the Gaelic Athletic Association
- Seamus Gibson, retired Irish sportsperson
- Séamus Gillen (born 1947), Irish retired hurler
- Seamus Grew (1951–1982), Irish volunteer in the Irish National Liberation Army
- Seamus Haji (born 1968), English DJ and record producer
- Séamus Harnedy (born 1990), Irish hurler
- Séamus Healy (born 1950), Irish politician
- Seamus Heaney (1939–2013), Nobel Prize–winning Irish poet, writer and lecturer
- Séamus Hearne (1932–2008), Irish hurler
- Seamus Heath (born 1961), Northern Irish former association football midfielder and coach
- Séamus Heery (1927–2014), Irish Gaelic footballer
- Séamus Hegarty (1940–2019), Irish Catholic prelate
- Séamus Henchy (1917–2009), Irish judge, barrister and academic
- Séamus Hennessy (hurler, born 1989) (born 1989), Irish hurler
- Seamus Henry (born 1949), Northern Ireland-born former member of the Legislative Assembly of the Northwest Territories, Canada
- Séamus Herron (born 1934), Irish former cyclist
- Séamus Hetherton (1930–2019), Irish Gaelic footballer
- Séamus Hickey (born 1987), Irish sportsperson
- Seamus Hoare, Irish former Gaelic footballer
- Séamus Hogan (born c. 1947), Irish retired sportsperson
- Séamus Horgan (born 1946), Irish retired hurler
- Seamus Hughes (trade unionist) (1881–1943), Irish trade unionist, revolutionary, composer, and public servant
- Séamus Hughes (born 1952), Irish judge and politician
- Séamus Keely (1889–1974), Irish politician
- Seamus Kelly (footballer) (born 1974), Irish former footballer
- Seamus Kelly (rugby union, born 1991) (born 1991), American former rugby union player
- Seamus Kelly (rugby union, born 1931) (1931–2012), Irish former rugby union player
- Séamus Kennedy (cyclist) (1947–2012), Irish cyclist
- Seamus Kennedy (singer) (born 1964), Irish singer, comedian and writer
- Séamus Kennedy (hurler) (born 1993), Irish Gaelic footballer and hurler
- Séamus Kenny (born 1980), Irish Gaelic footballer
- Séamus Kirk (born 1945), Irish politician
- Seamus Kotyk (born 1980), Canadian ice hockey coach and former goaltender
- Séamus Lagan (1947–2018), Irish Gaelic footballer
- Seamus Leydon, Gaelic footballer
- Seamus Logan (born 1958), British politician
- Séamus Looney (born 1950), Irish former sportsperson
- Seamus Ludlow (1929–1976), Irish forester and murder victim
- Seamus Lynch (born 1945), former Irish republican and socialist politician
- Séamus Mac an Iomaire (1891–1967), Irish botanist and writer
- Séamus Mac Cathmhaoil, Anglican Archbishop of Cashel
- Seamus Mac Cruitín (1815–1870), Irish poet and bard
- Séamus Mac Dhòmhnaill, 6th of Dunnyveg (died 1565), Scottish Clan Chief
- Séamus Mac Gearailt (born 1945), Irish retired Gaelic football trainer, coach, selector and former player
- Séamus mac Pilib Mac Mathghamhna (died 1519), Bishop of Derry
- Seamus MacBennett (1925–1995), footballer
- Séamus Mackey (born 1938), retired Irish sportsperson
- Seamus Malin (born 1940), Irish former journalist
- Seamus Mallon (1936–2020), Irish politician: Senator, MP, MLA, and deputy First Minister of Northern Ireland
- Seamus Mallon (rugby union) (born 1980), Irish former professional rugby union player
- Seamus Maloney, former Australian rules footballer
- Seamus Martin (journalist) (born 1942), retired journalist and broadcasting administrator
- Seamus McCaffery (born 1950), American judge, Pennsylvania Supreme Court justice
- Seamus McCallion, Irish former professional rugby league footballer
- Séamus McCarthy (born 1954), Irish former Gaelic footballer
- Seamus McDonagh (boxer), actor, screenwriter, filmmaker and retired boxer
- Séamus McElwaine (1960–1986), volunteer in Provisional Irish Republican Army
- Séamus McEnaney, Gaelic football manager and businessman
- Séamus McFerran (1916–1968), president of the Gaelic Athletic Association
- Seamus McGarvey (born 1967), Northern Irish cinematographer
- Seamus McGrane (died 2019), Irish dissident republican
- Seamus McGrath (born 1976), Canadian retired professional mountain biker
- Seamus McGraw, American journalist and author
- Séamus McGuinness (1930–2008), Irish Gaelic footballer
- Seamus McGuire, Irish fiddle player
- Séamus McHugh (born 1956), Irish Gaelic footballer
- Seamus McIntyre (1971–2001), Irish sportsperson
- Seamus McKee, Northern Irish broadcaster
- Seamus McMurphy (c. 1720–1750), Irish poet and rapparee
- Seamus McNamara (born 1985), American-born former Australian rules footballer
- Seamus McSporran (born 1938), Scottish retired worker in multiple jobs on the Isle of Gigha
- Seamus Metress (born 1933), American academic
- Séamus Moore (politician) (died 1940), Irish politician and businessman
- Seamus Moore (singer) (born 1947), Irish singer
- Seamus Moynihan, Irish former Gaelic footballer
- Séamus Murphy (1907–1975), Irish sculptor
- Séamus Murphy (Gaelic footballer) (born 1938), Irish former sportsperson
- Séamus Murphy (Wexford hurler) (born 1950s), retired Irish hurling manager and former player
- Séamus Murphy (Carlow hurler) (born 1986), Irish hurler
- Seamus Noonan, Irish lawyer
- Séamus Ó Braonáin (1881–1970), Irish sportsman and public servant
- Séamus Ó Duilearga (1899–1980), Irish folklorist and academic
- Séamus Ó Fearghail (fl. 1711–1718), Irish poet and scribe
- Séamus Ó Grianna (1889–1969), Irish writer
- Seamus Ó hÉilidhe (died 1595), Irish clergyman
- Séamus Ó hEocha (1880–1959), Irish educator
- Séamus P. Ó Mórdha (1915–2005), Irish teacher and historian
- Séamus Ó Néill (1910–1981), Irish writer
- Séamus Ó Riain (1916–2007), Irish GAA player and administrator
- Séamus Ó Siaghail (fl. 1636?), Irish scribe
- Séamus Ó Súilleabháin (fl. 1849), Irish scribe, writer and translator
- Seamus O'Connell (footballer) (1930–2013) was an English amateur footballer
- Seamus O'Connor (born 1997), American-born snowboarder
- Séamus O'Doherty (1882–1945), Irish republican
- Seamus O'Donovan (1896–1979), Irish explosives expert and leading volunteer in the Irish Republican Army
- Séamus O'Farrell (died 1973), Irish politician and journalist
- Séamus O'Malley (1903–2002), Irish Gaelic footballer and Gaelic games administrator
- Seamus O'Neill (Gaelic footballer) (born 1982), Gaelic footballer
- Seamus O'Regan (born 1971), Canadian broadcast journalist
- Séamus O'Shea (born 1987), Gaelic footballer
- Séamus Pattison (1936–2018), Irish politician
- Séamus Plunkett (born 1961), Irish retired hurler
- Séamus Power (Waterford hurler) (1929–2016), Irish sportsperson
- Séamus Power (Tipperary hurler) (born 1952), Irish retired sportsperson
- Séamus Power (golfer) (born 1987), Irish professional golfer
- Séamus Prendergast (born 1980), Irish hurler
- Seamus Quaid (1937–1980), Irish police officer killed by the IRA
- Séamus Qualter (born 1967), Irish retired hurler and hurling manager
- Seamus Quinn, former Gaelic footballer
- Seamus Rafter (1873–1918), Irish Republican
- Séumas Robinson (Irish republican) (1890–1961), Irish rebel and politician
- Seamus Robinson (fencer) (born 1975), Australian fencer
- Séamus Roche (born 1969), Irish retired sportsperson and referee
- Seamus Ross (born 1957), academic and researcher based in Canada
- Séamus Ryan (1895–1933), member of Seanad Éireann
- Séamus Ryan (hurler), Irish priest, lecturer and hurler
- Seamus Ryan (photographer) (born 1964), Irish-born photographer
- Séamus Scanlon (born 1981), Irish Gaelic footballer
- Séamus Shinnors (born 1945), retired Irish sportsperson
- Seamus Tansey (born 1943), Irish flute player
- Seamus Treacy, Northern Irish lawyer
- Seamus Twomey (1919–1989), Irish republican
- Séamus Whelan (born 1938), Irish former sportsperson
- Séamus Woulfe (born 1962), Irish lawyer

== See also ==
- James (name)
- Jacob (name)
- List of Irish-language given names
