= List of Scottish Gaelic given names =

This list of Scottish Gaelic given names shows Scottish Gaelic given names beside their English language equivalent. In some cases, the equivalent can be a cognate, in other cases it may be an Anglicised spelling derived from the Gaelic name, or in other cases it can be an etymologically unrelated name.

== Feminine names ==
=== A ===
Scottish Gaelic	English	Ref	Note
Ailios	Alice		
Ailis	Alice		
Aimil	Amelia, Emily		
Aingealag	Angelica		
Anabla	Annabella		
Anna	Ann, Anne, Annie		

=== B ===
Scottish Gaelic	English	Ref	Note
Barabal	Barbara		
Baraball	Barbara		
Barabla	Barbara		
Bearnas	Bernice		SG equivalent of En Berenice. Also considered a feminine form of SG Bearnard.
Beasag	Bessy, Bessie, Betsie, Betty		
Beathag	Beth, Rebecca, Sophia, Sophie		A feminine form of SG Beathan.
Beileag	Bella		SG pet form of SG Iseabail.
Beitidh	Betty		SG equivalent of En Betty.
Beitiris	Beatrice		SG equivalent of En Beatrice.
Beitris	Beatrice		
Bhioctoria	Victoria		SG equivalent of En Victoria.
Brighde, Brìghde	Bride, Bridget		
Brìde	Bridget		
Buaidheach	Boudicca		

=== C ===
Scottish Gaelic	English	Ref	Note
Cairistiòna	Christine		
Cairistìne, Cairstiona	Christina		See also SG cognate Cairistìona.
Cairistìona	Christina, Christine		See also SG cognate Cairistìne.
Caitir	Catherine, Clarissa		A mis-analysis of SG Caitrìona as Caitir Fhiona. Anglicised as the unrelated Clarissa.
Caitrìona	Catherine, Catrina, Catriona, Katherine		SG equivalent of En Katherine. Anglicised as Catriona.
Catrìona	Catherine, Catriona, Katherine		SG equivalent of En Katherine. Anglicised as Catriona.
Ceana	Kenna		
Ceit	Kate, Katie		SG equivalent of Kate.
Ceiteag	Katie, Katy, Kitty		
Ceitidh	Katie		
Ciorsdan	Christina		
Ciorstag	Kirsty		SG equivalent of En Kirsty. SG variant of Ciorstaidh. See SG variants Curstaidh, Curstag.
Ciorstaidh	Kirsty		SG equivalent of En Kirsty. SG variant of Ciorstag. See SG variants Curstaidh, Curstag.
Ciorstan	Kirsten		
Cotrìona	Catherine		On Lewis.
Criosaidh	Chrissie		
Curstag	Kirsty		SG equivalent of En Kirsty. SG variant of Curstaidh. See SG variants Ciorstaidh, Ciorstag.
Curstaidh	Kirsty		SG equivalent of En Kirsty. SG variant of Curstaidh. See SG variants Ciorstaidh, Ciorstag.

=== D ===
Scottish Gaelic	English	Ref	Note
Deirdre	Deirdre		
Deòiridh	Dorcas		Etymologically unrelated to En Dorcas.
Dior-bhorgàil	Dorothy		Etymologically unrelated to Dorothy.
Diorbhail, Dior-bhail, Dior-bhàil, Dìorbhail	Devorgilla, Dorothy		Etymologically unrelated to En Dolly. Dorothy.
Doileag	Dolina		
Doilidh	Dolly		
Doirin	Doreen		
Dolag	Dolina, Dolly		Feminine form of En Donald. Etymologically unrelated to En Dolly.

=== E, È ===
Scottish Gaelic	English	Ref	Note
Ealasaid	Elizabeth		SG equivalent of En Elizabeth.
Eamhair	Evir		
Eilidh	Ailie, Ellen, Ellie, Helen		SG name form of En "Helen" .
Eimhir	Emer		SG form of Ir Eimhear.
Eubh	Eve		SG equivalent of En Eve.
Eubha	Eva, Eve		
Èibhlin	Evelyn		

=== F ===
Scottish Gaelic	English	Ref	Note
Fionnaghal	Fiona, Flora		Etymologically unrelated to Fiona. See SG variant Fionnaghal.
Fionnuala	Fenella, Finella, Finola		Modern SG form of older Gaelic Fionnguala. Fenella, Finella, Finola are Anglicisations. See SG variant Fionnaghal.
Floireans	Florence		
Flòraidh	Flora		
Frangag	Frances		

=== G ===
Scottish Gaelic	English	Ref	Note
Giorsail	Grace		
Giorsal	Grace, Griselda, Grizzel		
Gormall	Gormelia		

=== L ===
Scottish Gaelic	English	Ref	Note
Labhra	Laura		
Leagsaidh	Lexie, Lexi		SG equivalent of En Lexie.
Leitis	Letitia		
Lili	Lilias, Lily		
Liùsaidh	Louisa, Lucy		SG equivalent of En Louisa, Lucy.
Lucrais	Lucretia		
Lìosa	Lisa		
Lias	Liza		

=== M ===
Scottish Gaelic	English	Ref	Note
Magaidh	Maggie		
Maighread	Margaret		SG equivalent of En Margaret. See also SG variant Mairead.
Mairead	Maretta, Margaret, Marietta		SG equivalent of En Margaret. See also SG variant Maighread.
Mairearad	Margaret		
Malamhìn	Malavina (Anglicization), Malaveen (Pronunciation)		Meaning "Smooth brow". Believed to have been created by James Macpherson in the 18th century.
Malmhìn	Malvina (Anglicization)		Alternate spelling of Malamhìn
Marsail	Marjory		
Marsaili	Marcella, Margery, Marjory		SG equivalent of En Margery, and Marcella.
Marta	Martha		
Milread	Mildred		
Moibeal	Mabel		
Moire	Mary		The name of the Biblical Virgin Mary.
Moireach	Martha		
Muire	Mary		
Muireall	Marion, Muriel		Muriel is an Anglicisation.
Màiri	Mary		SG equivalent of En Mary. See also SG variant Màili.
Màili	Mary, May, Molly		SG equivalent of En Mary. See also SG variant Màiri.
Mòr	Marion		
Mòrag	Morag, Marion, Sarah		

=== O ===
Scottish Gaelic	English	Ref	Note
Oighrig	Africa, Effie, Efric, Erica, Etta, Euphemia, Henrietta		Etymologically unrelated to En Africa, Effie, Euphemia, Etta, Henrietta. Efric is an Anglicisation. See also SG variants Eithrig, Eiric.
Olibhia	Olivia		

=== P ===
Scottish Gaelic	English	Ref	Note
Peanaidh	Penny		
Peigi	Peggy		SG equivalent of En Peggy.

=== R ===
Scottish Gaelic	English	Ref	Note
Raonaid	Rachel		Etymologically unrelated to En Rachel. See also SG variant Raghnaid.
Raghnaid	Rachel		Etymologically unrelated to En Rachel. See also SG variant Raonaid.
Raodhailt	Rachel		
Rut	Ruth		

=== S ===
Scottish Gaelic	English	Ref	Note
Seasaidh	Jessie		
Seonag	Joan, Shona		SG equivalent of En Joan. Shona is an Anglicisation.
Seònaid	Janet, Jessie, Seona, Shona		SG equivalent of En Janet. Shona is an Anglicisation; Seona is a semi-Anglicisation.
Simeag	Jemima		
Siubhan, Siùbhan	Johann, Judith		Cognate of Johann. Judith is an etymologically unrelated Anglicisation.
Siùsaidh	Susan, Susanna, Susie, Susy		SG equivalent of En Susanna, Susan, Susie. See also SG variant Siùsan.
Siùsan	Susanna, Susan		SG equivalent of En Susanna, Susan. See also SG variant Siùsaidh.
Sorcha	Claire, Clara, Sarah, Sorche		Etymologically unrelated to Claire, Clara, and Sarah.
Sìle	Cecilia, Cecily, Celia, Cicily, Julia, Judith, Sheila		Sheila is an Anglicisation of the Ir Síle, which is a cognate of Cecily.
Sìleas	Julia		
Sìlis	Cicely, Julia		
Sìne	Jane, Jean, Jenny, Sheena		SG equivalent of En Jane. The En Jean, Jenny are cognates. Sheena is an Anglicisation.
Sìneag	Jeanie		
Sìonag	Jeannie		

=== T ===
Scottish Gaelic	English	Ref	Note
Teasag	Jessie		SG equivalent of En Jessie.
Teàrlag	Caroline, Charlotte		Etymologically unrelated to Caroline, Charlotte. A feminine form of the masculine SG Teàrlach.

=== U, Ù ===
Scottish Gaelic	English	Ref	Note
Ùna, Una	Agnes, Winifred, Euna,		Ùna is the SG form of the Ir Úna. Anglicised as Euna. Etymologically unrelated to Agnes, Winifred.

== Masculine names ==
=== A ===
Scottish Gaelic	English	Ref	Note
Adaidh	Adie, Addie		SG form of En Adie, which is a pet form of En Adam.
Àdhamh	Adam		SG equivalent of En Adam.
Ailbeart	Albert		SG equivalent of En Albert.
Ailean	Alan, Allan		SG equivalent of En Alan.
Ailig	Alec, Alex, Alick		SG form of En Alick, which a variant of En Alec, which is a short form of En Alexander.
Ailpean	Alpin		Fair, White
Ailpein	Alpin, Alpine		Alpin, Alpine are Anglicisations.
Aindrea	Andrew		SG equivalent of En Andrew.
Aindreas	Andrew		
Alasdair	Alexander, Allaster, Alistair		SG equivalent of En Alexander. Allaster, Alistair are Anglicisations.
Amhladh	Aulay		SG form of En Olaf. Aulay is an Anglicisation.
Amhlaibh	Aulay		
Amhlaidh	Aulay		SG form of En Olaf. Aulay is an Anglicisation.
Amhlaigh	Aulay		
Angaidh	Angie		En Angie is a pet form of En Angus, and represents SG Angaidh.
Anndra	Andrew		
Anndrais	Andrew		
Aodh	Hugh		Modern SG form of OI Áed.
Aodhàn	Aedan, Aidan		
Aonghas	Aeneas, Angus, Innes		Anglicised as Angus. See SG variant Aonghus.
Aonghus	Angus		Anglicised as Angus. See SG variant Aonghas.
Arailt	Harold		SG equivalent of En Harold.
Artair	Arthur		SG equivalent of En Arthur.
Artur	Arthur		
Asgall	Askill		

=== B ===
Scottish Gaelic	English	Ref	Note
Baltair	Walter		
Bearnard	Bernard		SG equivalent of En Bernard.
Beathan	Bean, Benjamin		Etymologically unrelated to En Benjamin. Bean is an Anglicisation.
Benneit	Benedict		SG equivalent of En Benedict.
Bhaltair	Walter		SG equivalent of En Walter. See also SG variant Bhatair.
Bhatair	Walter		SG equivalent of En Walter. See also SG variant Bhaltair.
Brian	Brian		

=== C ===
Scottish Gaelic	English	Ref	Note
Cailean	Colin		
Calum (double 'L' is an anglicisation, Calum is Gaelic)	Callum		SG form of LL Columba.
Caomhainn	Kevin		
Cathal	Cahal, Cathel, Charles, Kathel		
Cliamain	Clement		SG equivalent of En Clement.
Coinneach	Kenneth		Kenneth is an Anglicisation.
Còiseam	Constantine		Name of three kings of Scotland, Còiseam I, Còiseam II and Còiseam III.
Colla	Coll		
Colum Cille	Columba		
Comhnall	Conal		
Conall	Connal		
Conn	Con, Conn		
Coraidh	Cory		
Crìsdean	Christopher, Christian		Cognate of En Christian. Used as a SG equivalent of En Christopher, Cristian.
Cuithbeart	Cuthbert		SG equivalent of En Cuthbert.

=== D ===
Scottish Gaelic	English	Ref	Note
Dàibhidh	David, Davie		SG equivalent of En David.
Daidh	David		
Daniel	Daniel		
Deòrsa	George		SG equivalent of En George.
Diarmad	Dermid, Dermot, Diarmid		SG equivalent of Ir Diarmaid. Dermid, Diarmid are Anglicisations.
Dòmhnall	Donald		Donald is an Anglicisation, and associated with Clan Macdonald.
Dòmhnull	Donald		Donald is an Anglicisation.
Donaidh	Donnie		
Donnchadh	Duncan		Duncan is an Anglicisation.
Dubh	Duff		Duff is an Anglicisation.
Dubh-shìth	Duffie		
Dubhghall	Dougal, Dugal, Dugald		Dougal, Dugal, Dugald are Anglicisations. See also SG variant Dùghall.
Dànaidh	Danny		
Dùghall	Dougal, Dugal, Dugald		Dougal, Dugal, Dugald are Anglicisations. See also SG variant Dùghall.
Dùghlas	Douglas		

=== E ===
Scottish Gaelic	English	Ref	Note
Eachann	Hector		
Eacharn	Hector		
Eairdsidh	Archie		SG equivalent of En Archie.
Ealar	Ellar		
Eanraig	Henry		SG equivalent of En Henry.
Eanruig	Henry		
Edelret	Ethelred		
Èideard	Edward		SG equivalent of En Edward.
Eirdsidh	Archie		
Ellair	Ellar		Ellar is an Anglicisation.
Eòghann,	Ewan, Euan, Ewen		
Eumann	Edmund		SG equivalent of En Edmund.
Eòghan	Ewan, Euan, Ewen		
Eòin	John		SG equivalent of En John.
Eòsaph	Joseph		

=== F ===
Scottish Gaelic	English	Ref	Note
Faolan	Fillan		Little Wolf
Fearchar	Farquhar		Farquhar is an Anglicisation.
Fearghas	Fergus		Fergus is an Anglicisation.
Filib	Philip, Phillip		SG equivalent of En Philip.
Fionn	Fingal		
Fionnghall	Fingal, Fingall		Fingal, Fingall are Anglicisations.
Fionnghan	Fingan		
Fionnlagh	Findlay, Finlay, Finley		Findlay, Finlay, Finley are Anglicisations.
Frang	Frank		
Frangan	Francis		See also SG Prainnseas.
Frangean	Frankin		
Friseal	Fraser		

=== G ===
Scottish Gaelic	English	Ref	Note
Gill-Eathain	Gillean		
Gill-Eòin	Gillean		
Gill-Iosa, Gillìosa	Gillies		
Gille-Aindreis	Gillanders		
Gille-Brìdhde	Gilbert		
Gille-Caluim	Malcolm		
Gille-Crìosd	Christopher, Gillchrist		
Gilleasbaig, Gill-easbuig, Gilleasbuig	Archibald, Gillespie		Etymologically unrelated to En Archibald.
Gillebeart	Gilbert		
Gillebrìde	Gilbert		
Goiridh	Godfrey, Geoffrey		
Goraidh	Godfrey, Geoffrey		
Grannd	Grant		
Greum, Greumach	Graeme, Graham		
Griogair	Gregor, Gregory, Grigor		SG derivative of the NF Grégoire. Gregor is an Anglicisation.
Guaidre	Godfrey		
Gòrdan	Gordon		

=== H ===
Scottish Gaelic	English	Ref	Note
Harsain	Harrison, Harry		
Harailt	Harold		
Hòmair	Homer		
Horas	Horace		
Hùisdean	Hugh		Variant of SG Ùisdean.

=== I ===
Scottish Gaelic	English	Ref	Note
Iagan	Johnny		Used in certain areas, such as Barra, and South Uist. Said to be a diminutive form of SG Iain; others say it is a diminutive form of SG Aodh (note that these two Gaelic names are not etymologically related).
Iain	John, Ian		SG form of En Ian, which is a Scottish form of En John.
Ianatan	Jonathan		
Iomhair	Iver, Ivor, Evander		
Iomhar	Ivor		
Iosag	Isaac		
Iàcob	Jacob		
Iòna	Jonah		
Iòsaph	Joseph		

=== L ===
Scottish Gaelic	English	Ref	Note
Labhrainn	Laurence, Lawrence		SG equivalent of En Laurence.
Labhruinn	Lawrence		
Lachlann	Lachlan		Lachaidh=Lachie for short
Laomann	Lamont		
Leannain, Leòmhannàrd	Leonard, Leonardo		the name Leannain as a Surname is often translated to Leonard despite different meanings
Lamhaich, Làmhaich, Leanaidh	Lenny, Lennie, Len, Lenford		
Luthais, Leodhas	Lewis, Louis		SG equivalent of En Louis.
Lùcas	Luke		

=== M ===
Scottish Gaelic	English	Ref	Note
Maoilios	Myles		Etymologically unrelated to En Myles.
Maol-Chaluim	Malcolm		
Maol-Domhnuich, Maol-Dòmhnuich	Ludovic		Etymologically unrelated to En Ludovic.
Maol-Iosa	Malise		
Maol-Moire	Miles, Myles		
Maoldònaich	Ludovic		Etymologically unrelated to En Ludovic.
Maolmhuire	Myles		
Maolruibh	Milroy		
Marc	Mark		
Marcas	Mark		
Màrtainn	Martin		
Mata	Matthew		
Muireach	Murdoch		
Munga	Mungo		SG form of En Mungo.
Mungan	Mungo		
Murchadh	Murdo, Murdoch		
Mànas	Magnus		
Mànus	Magnus		SG form of En Magnus.
Mìcheal	Michael		
Mìcheil	Michael		

=== N ===
Scottish Gaelic	English	Ref	Note
Neacal	Nicol, Nicholas		SG equivalent of En Nicholas.
Neachdainn	Nechtan		
Niall	Neal, Neale, Neil,		Neal, Neale, Neil are Anglicisations.

=== O ===
Scottish Gaelic	English	Ref	Note
Odaiseis	Ulysses, Odysseus		
Oilbhreis	Oliver		
Oisean	Ossian		The Anglicised form, Ossian, was popularized by James Macpherson, author of 18th century 'Ossianic' poetry.

=== P ===
Scottish Gaelic	English	Ref	Note
Paidean	Paton		
Para	Pat, Pete		A contracted form, or pet form, of SG Pàdraig. See also SG Pàra.
Peadair	Peter		See also SG Peadar.
Peadar	Peter		Used for the name of the saint (Saint Peter). See also SG Pàdraig. See also SG Peadair.
Peadaran	Peterkin		En Peterkin is a diminutive of En Peter.
Peadrus	Petrus		
Prainnseas	Francis		See also SG Frangan.
Pàdair	Patrick, Peter		Dialectal form of SG Pàdraig. Found on Arran (as a SG form of En Peter).
Pàdraig	Patrick		SG equivalent of En Patrick
Pàdruig	Patrick		
Pàl	Paul		See also SG Pòl.
Pàra	Patrick		Dialectal form of SG Pàdraig. See also SG Para.
Pàrlan	Bartholemew, Parlan		SG form of Ir Parthalán. Etymologically unrelated to En Bartholemew. En Parlin is an Anglicised form.
Pòl	Paul		See also SG Pàl.

=== R ===
Scottish Gaelic	English	Ref	Note
Raghnall	Ranald, Randal, Ronald		Ranald, Randal, Ronald are Anglicisations. Randal is etymologically unrelated. See also SG Raonull.
Raibeart	Robert		SG equivalent of En Robert. See also SG Roibeart.
Raonull	Ranald,	Ronald	See also SG Raghnall.
Ringean	Ninian, Ringan		Ringan is Scots.
Risteard	Richard		See also SG Ruiseart.
Roibeart	Robert		See also SG Raibeart.
Ruairidh	Derrick, Roderick, Rory		Roderick, Rory are Anglicisations. Etymologically unrelated to Roderick. See also SG Ruaraidh.
Ruaridh	Derrick, Roderick, Rory		Roderick, Rory are Anglicisations. Etymologically unrelated to Roderick. See also SG Ruaraidh.
Ruaraidh	Derrick, Roderick, Rory		Roderick, Rory are Anglicisations. Etymologically unrelated to Roderick.
Ruiseart	Richard Ryan		SG equivalent to En Richard. See also SG Risteard. Scots equivalent to the Irish Gealic name O' Riain/Rian/Ryan by meaning.
Ràild	Harold		

=== S ===
Scottish Gaelic	English	Ref	Note
Sachairi	Zachary		SG equivalent of En Zachary. See also unrelated SG Sgàire.
Sandaidh	Sandy		SG equivalent of En Sandy.
Seaghdh	Seth, Shaw		Anglicised as the etymologically unrelated Seth, and Shaw.
Seathan	John		SG equivalent of En John. Derived from OF Jean, Jehan.
Seoc	Jack, Jock		See also SG Seocan.
Seocan	Jockie		SG pet form of En Jock. See also SG Seoc.
Seonaidh	Johnnie, Johnny		
Seumas	Hamish, James		SG equivalent of En James. Hamish is an Anglicisation of the vocative case of Seumas - Sheumais.
Seòras	George		SG equivalent of En George.
Seòsaidh	Joseph		SG pet form of En Joseph.
Sgàire	Zachary		Anglicised as the etymologically unrelated Zachary. Borne by the Macaulay clan on Lewis. See also unrelated Sachairi.
Sim	Simon		See also SG Simidh, Sìm, Sìomon.
Simidh	Simon		See also SG Sim, Sìm, Sìomon.
Solamh	Solomon		
Somhairle	Samuel, Somerled, Sorley		Etymologically unrelated to En Samuel. Anglicised as Sorley. En Somerled is a cognate. See also unrelated SG Samuel.
Steafan	Stephen, Steven		SG equivalent of En Stephen.
Stiùbhard	Stuart, Stewart		See also SG Stiùbhart.
Stiùbhart	Stewart		See also SG Stiùbhard.
Sìm	Sime, Simon		See also SG Sim, Simidh, Sìomon.
Sìomon	Simon		See also SG Sim, Simidh, Sìm.

=== T ===
Scottish Gaelic	English	Ref	Note
Tadhg	Tad, Teague, Teigue		Anglicised as Tad, Teague, and Teigue. See also SG Taog.
Tàmhas	Thomas		See also SG Tòmas.
Taog	Teague		See also SG Tadhg.
Tasgall	Taskill		Anglicised as Taskill; borne among the MacAskill clan on Berneray.
Teàrlach	Charles		Etymologically unrelated to En Charles.
Tiobaid	Theobald		SG equivalent of En Theobald.
Tomag	Tommy		See also SG Tomaidh, Tòmachan.
Tomaidh	Tommy		See also SG Tomag, Tòmachan.
Torcadall	Torquil		See also SG Torcall, Torcull.
Torcall	Torquil		Anglicised as Torquil. See also SG Torcadall, Torcull.
Torcull	Torquil		See also SG Torcadall, Torcall.
Tormod	Norman		Anglicised as the etymologically unrelated Norman. See also SG Tormoid.
Tormoid	Norman		En Norman is etymologically unrelated. See also SG Tormod.
Tòmachan	Tommy		See also SG Tomag, Tomaidh.
Tòmas	Thomas		SG equivalent of En Thomas. See also SG Tàmhas.

=== U, Ù ===
Scottish Gaelic	English	Ref	Note
Uailean	Valentine		SG equivalent of En Valentine. See also SG Ualan.
Ualan	Valentine		SG equivalent of En Valentine. See also SG Uailean.
Ualraig	Walrick		
Uarraig	Kennedy		Anglicised as the etymologically unrelated Kennedy. The name is said to have been borne by various families of the surname Kennedy.
Uilleachan	Willie		A diminutive of Uilleam; likewise, En Willie is a diminutive of En William.
Uilleam	William		SG equivalent of En William.
Uisdean, Ùisdean	Eugene, Hugh		Anglicised as the etymologically unrelated Hugh; also unrelated to En Eugene. See also SG Hùisdean, and also the unrelated SG Aodh.

== See also ==
- List of Irish-language given names
