= Mac Somhairle =

The Gaelic surname Mac Somhairle means "son of Somhairle". The personal name Somhairle is a Gaelicised form of the Old Norse Sumarliðr and Sumarliði. The Old Norse Sumarliðr is composed of the elements sumar ("summer") and liðr ("seafarer"). As such, Sumarliðr and Sumarliði can be taken to mean "summer warrior", "summer seafarer". Anglicised forms of Mac Somhairle include: MacSorley, McSorley, Sorley, and Sorlie. Many settled in Ulster, hired as Gallowglass for Gaelic Kingdoms.

Forms of the surname have been borne by several families of note. For example, one such family was Clann Somhairle, descended from Somhairle mac Giolla Brighde (died 1164); another was a family closely related to the Lamonts and descended from a late thirteenth-century eponym; another was a sept of the MacDonalds and Camerons, descended from an armiger of Eóin Mac Domhnaill II, Lord of the Isles (died 1503); the name was also borne by a branch of the MacDonalds settled in Ireland.

== People ==
- Mac Somhairle (died 1247), Norse-Gaelic warlord active in Ireland, probably identical to Ruaidhrí mac Raghnaill (died 1247?)
- Aonghus mac Somhairle (died 1210), representative of Clann Somhairle
- Dubhghall mac Ruaidhrí (died 1268), King of Argyll and the Isles, also known as Dubhgall Mac Somhairle and Mac Sumarlaide
- Dubhghall mac Somhairle (died 1175×), King of the Isles
- Raghnall mac Somhairle (died 1191/1192 – c.1210/1227), King of the Isles
