= The Man with the Twisted Lip =

Short story by Arthur Conan Doyle featuring Sherlock Holmes

- Short story by Arthur Conan Doyle
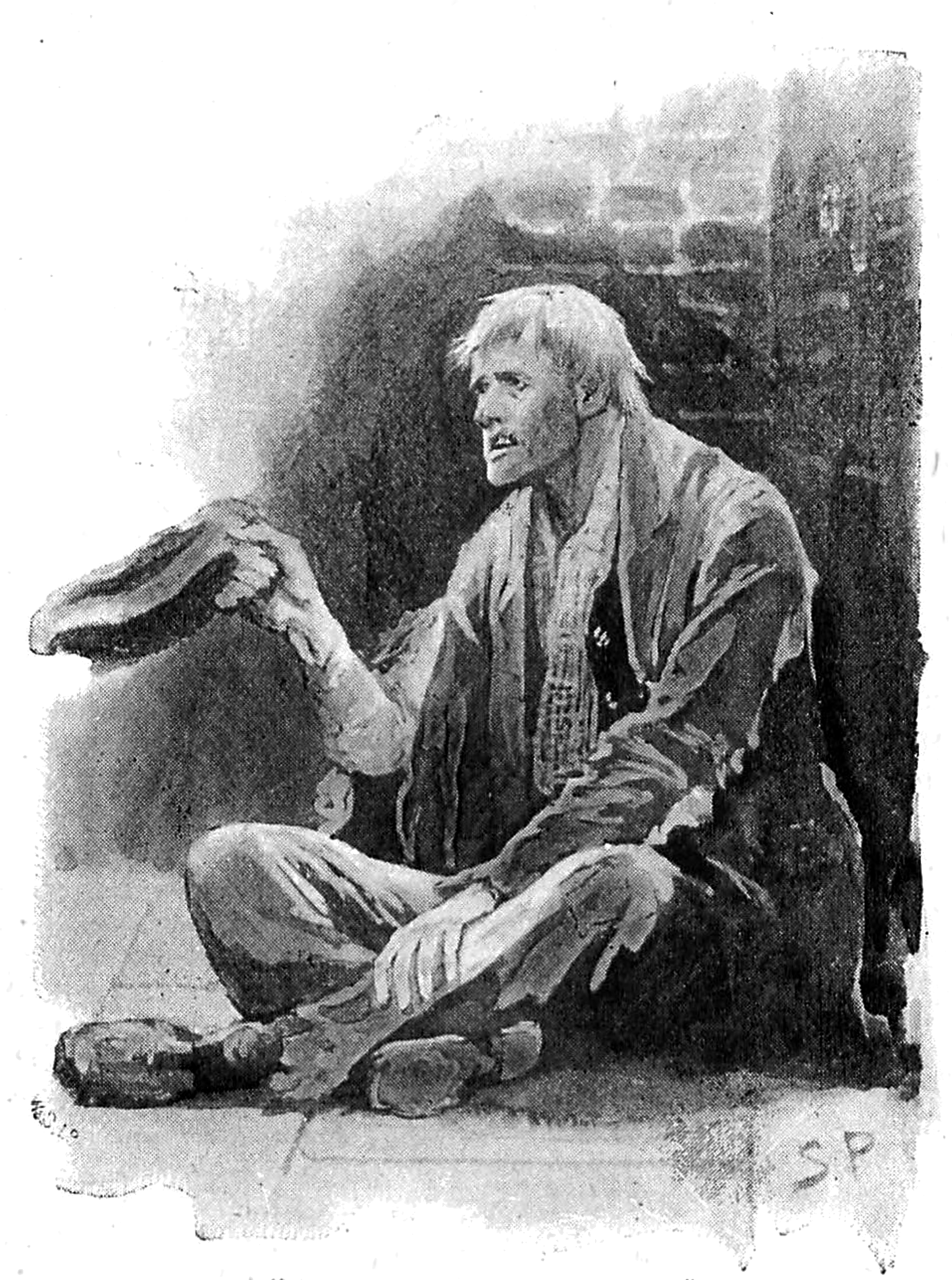
- Hugh Boone begs for pennies in a London street, 1891 illustration by Sidney Paget

Text available at Wikisource
- Country: United Kingdom
- Language: English
- Genre: Detective fiction short stories

Publication
- Published in: Strand Magazine
- Publication date: December 1891

Chronology
- Series: The Adventures of Sherlock Holmes
| The Five Orange Pips | The Adventure of the Blue Carbuncle |

"The Man with the Twisted Lip", one of the 56 short Sherlock Holmes stories written by Sir Arthur Conan Doyle, is the sixth of the twelve stories in The Adventures of Sherlock Holmes. The story was first published in the Strand Magazine in December 1891. Doyle ranked "The Man with the Twisted Lip" sixteenth in a list of his nineteen favourite Sherlock Holmes stories.

== Plot ==
The story begins when a friend of Dr. Watson's wife comes to Watson's house, frantic because her husband, Isa Whitney, an opium addict, has gone missing. Watson helps her by pulling him out of the opium den and sending him home. Watson is surprised to find that Sherlock Holmes is there too, in disguise and trying to get information to solve a different case about a man who has disappeared. Watson stays to listen to Holmes tell the story of the case of Neville St. Clair.

St. Clair is a prosperous, respectable, punctual man. His family's home is in the country, but he visits London every day on business. One day when Mr. St. Clair was in London, Mrs. St. Clair also went to London separately. She happened to pass down Upper Swandam Lane, a "vile alley" near the London docks, where the opium den is located. Glancing up, she saw her husband at a second-floor window of the opium den. He vanished from the window immediately, and Mrs. St. Clair was sure that something was wrong.

She tried to enter the building, but her path was blocked by a lascar, who owns the opium den. She fetched the police, but they did not find Mr. St. Clair; the room behind the window was the lair of a dirty, disfigured beggar, known to the police as Hugh Boone. The police were about to put her story down as a mistake of some kind when Mrs. St. Clair noticed a box of wooden toy bricks that her husband said he would buy for their son. A further search turned up some of St. Clair's clothes; later, his coat, with the pockets stuffed with hundreds of pennies and halfpennies, was found on the bank of the River Thames, just below the building's back window. Bloodstains are found on the windowsill and bedroom floor.

Hugh Boone was arrested at once but would say nothing, except to deny any knowledge of St. Clair, and also vehemently resisted any attempt to make him wash. Holmes was initially quite convinced that St. Clair had been murdered, and that Boone was involved, so he investigated the den in disguise. He and Watson return to St. Clair's home, to a surprise - it is several days after the disappearance, but on that day, Mrs. St. Clair had received a letter from her husband in his own handwriting, with his signet ring enclosed, telling her not to worry. This forces Holmes to reconsider his conclusions, leading him eventually to an extraordinary solution. Holmes and Watson go the police station where Hugh Boone is held; Holmes brings a bath sponge, which he uses to wash the sleeping Boone's dirty face and reveal him as Neville St. Clair.

Mr. St. Clair has been living a double life, as a respectable businessman and as a squalid beggar. In his youth, he had been an actor before becoming a newspaper reporter. To research an article, he had disguised himself as a beggar for a short time, and was able to collect a surprising amount of money due to a skillset uncommon to beggars; his acting skills enabled him to emulate a more sympathetic character with make-up, as well as provide a repertoire of witty dialogue with which to entertain passers-by to offer coins — in this way, he was just as much a street performer as he was a beggar. Some time later, he was saddled with a large unexpected debt, so he returned to the street to beg for several days to pay it off. His newspaper salary was very small and, tempted by the much larger returns of begging, he eventually became a "professional" beggar. His takings were large enough (averaging over £700 a year, equivalent to £76,896 in 2025) that he was able to establish himself as a country gentleman, marry well, and begin a respectable family. His wife and children never knew what he did for a living, and when he was arrested, he feared exposure more than prison or the gallows. Since no murder has been committed, he is released, and Holmes and the police agree to keep Mr. St. Clair's secret on the condition that no more is heard of Hugh Boone.

== Points of interest ==
The ability of St. Clair to earn a good living begging is considered by some to be an unlikely event, but others disagree.

Doyle may have got the idea of a professional man making his money from begging from a short story by William Makepeace Thackeray called "Miss Shum's Husband" (1838).

In one in-universe point of interest, Watson's wife Mary calls him by the name "James" despite his established first name being "John". This led Dorothy L. Sayers to speculate that Mary may be using his middle name Hamish (an Anglicisation of "Sheumais", the vocative form of "Seumas", the Scottish Gaelic for James), though Doyle himself never addresses this beyond including the initial.

June 19 of 1889, the day when the story begins was actually Wednesday, whilst Watson states it is Friday.

== Publication history ==
"The Man with the Twisted Lip" was first published in the UK in The Strand Magazine in December 1891, and in the United States in the US edition of the Strand in January 1892. The story was published with ten illustrations by Sidney Paget in The Strand Magazine. It was included in the short story collection The Adventures of Sherlock Holmes, which was published in October 1892.

== Adaptations ==
=== Film and television ===
A silent short film version of the story titled The Man with the Twisted Lip was released in 1921. It was made as part of the Stoll film series starring Eille Norwood as Holmes.

In 1951, Rudolph Cartier produced an adaptation entitled The Man Who Disappeared. This adaptation was a pilot for a proposed television series starring John Longden as Holmes and Campbell Singer as Watson.

In 1964, the story was adapted into an episode of the BBC series Sherlock Holmes starring Douglas Wilmer and Nigel Stock, with Peter Madden as Inspector Lestrade and Anton Rodgers as Neville St Clair. The adaptation developed St Clair's attributed ability at repartee by showing him quoting from the classics, including Shakespeare.

Granada Television also produced a version in 1986, adapted by Alan Plater as part of their The Return of Sherlock Holmes television series, starring Jeremy Brett and Edward Hardwicke, with Denis Lill as Inspector Bradstreet, Clive Francis as Neville St. Clair, and Albert Moses as the Lascar.

An episode of the animated television series Sherlock Holmes in the 22nd Century was adapted from the story. The episode, titled "The Man with the Twisted Lip", aired in 2000.

The 2014 Sherlock episode "His Last Vow" begins with Sherlock being found in a drug den by John, reminiscent of the scene in the opium den from this story.

=== Audio ===
Edith Meiser adapted the story as an episode of the American radio series The Adventures of Sherlock Holmes, which aired on 24 November 1930, starring Richard Gordon as Sherlock Holmes and Leigh Lovell as Dr. Watson. Remakes of the script aired on 12 May 1935 (with Louis Hector as Holmes and Lovell as Watson)< and 22 February 1936 (with Gordon as Holmes and Harry West as Watson).

Meiser also adapted the story as an episode of the American radio series The New Adventures of Sherlock Holmes, with Basil Rathbone as Holmes and Nigel Bruce as Watson, that aired on 23 October 1939. Other episodes in the same series that were adapted from the story aired in 1940, 1943, 1944, and 1946 (with Frederick Worlock as Neville St Clair and Herbert Rawlinson as Inspector Bradstreet).

A radio adaptation aired on the BBC Light Programme in 1959, as part of the 1952–1969 radio series starring Carleton Hobbs as Holmes and Norman Shelley as Watson. It was adapted by Michael Hardwick.

"The Man with the Twisted Lip" was dramatised by Peter Mackie for BBC Radio 4 in 1990, as part of the 1989–1998 radio series starring Clive Merrison as Holmes and Michael Williams as Watson.

The story was adapted as an episode of The Classic Adventures of Sherlock Holmes, a series on the American radio show Imagination Theatre, with John Patrick Lowrie as Holmes and Lawrence Albert as Watson. The episode first aired in 2012.

In 2025, the podcast Sherlock & Co. adapted the story in a three-episode adventure called "The Man with the Twisted Lip", starring Harry Attwell as Sherlock Holmes, Paul Waggott as Dr. John Watson and Marta da Silva as Mariana "Mrs. Hudson" Ametxazurra. As a modern re-telling the opium addiction is reworked as a Ketamine addiction, Rhys Tees voices Lascar, Kimberley Nixon as Ruby St. Clair, and Thomas Mitchells as Hugh Boone.

- In 2026, Paul Waggott from Sherlock & Co. podcast reprised his role as John Watson redoing the story in its original text from 1892's The Adventures of Sherlock Holmes as an Audiobook, from Watson's first person perspective.

== See also ==
- Arthur Pember, a real-life 19th-century journalist who published stories based on disguising himself as a beggar.
