= Súilleabháin =

Súilleabháin may refer to:

- Amhlaoibh Ó Súilleabháin (1780−1838), Irish language author, linen draper, politician, and one time hedge school master
- Dónall Cam Ó Súilleabháin Béirre, also known as Donal Cam O'Sullivan Beare, (1561–1618), the last independent ruler of the O'Sullivan Beare
- Eoghan Rua Ó Súilleabháin (1748−1782), anglicized as Owen Roe O'Sullivan ("Red Owen"), was an Irish poet
- Eoin Ó Súilleabháin, also known as Size2shoes, a cross-genre Irish band from Limerick City
- Mícheál Ó Súilleabháin (1950−2018), Irish musician
- Mícheál Ó Súilleabháin (writer), Irish writer
- Muiris Ó Súilleabháin (1904−1950), became famous for his memoir of growing up on the Great Blasket Island off the western coast of Ireland
- Séamus Ó Súilleabháin (fl. 1849), Irish scribe, writer and translator
- Seán Ó Súilleabháin (1903–1996), Irish folklorist

== See also ==
- O'Sullivan
