= Séamus Ryan (disambiguation) =

Séamus Ryan (1895–1933) was an Irish politician.

Seamus Ryan can also refer to:

- Séamus Ryan (hurler), Irish priest, lecturer and hurler
- Seamus Ryan (photographer) (born 1964), Irish photographer
- Esoteric (rapper) (born 1975), an underground hip-hop artist
