= The Adventure of the Priory School =

- Short story by Arthur Conan Doyle
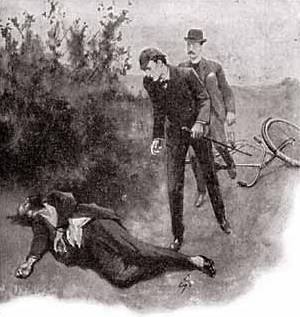
- Holmes discovers Heidegger's body, 1904 illustration by Sidney Paget

Text available at Wikisource
- Country: United Kingdom
- Language: English
- Genre: Detective fiction short stories

Publication
- Published in: Strand Magazine
- Publication date: January 1904

Chronology
- Series: The Return of Sherlock Holmes
The Adventure of the Solitary Cyclist	The Adventure of Black Peter

"The Adventure of the Priory School", one of the 56 Sherlock Holmes short stories written by Sir Arthur Conan Doyle, is one of 13 stories in the cycle collected as The Return of Sherlock Holmes. It was first published in Collier's in the United States on 30 January 1904, and in The Strand Magazine in the United Kingdom in February 1904. Doyle ranked "The Adventure of the Priory School" tenth in his list of his twelve favourite Holmes stories.

== Plot ==
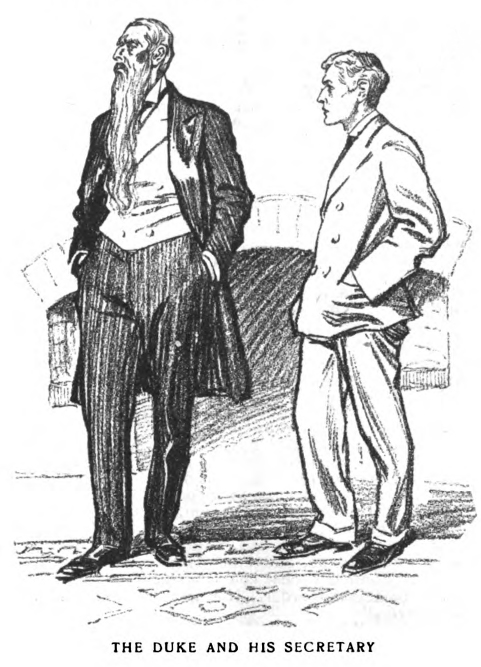
The Duke of Holdernesse and James Wilder, 1904 illustration by Frederic Dorr Steele in Collier's

Holmes receives a visit from Dr. Thorneycroft Huxtable, the founder and principal of a preparatory school called Priory School in Northern England. He beseeches Holmes to come back to Mackleton with him to look into the disappearance of one of his pupils, the ten-year-old Lord Saltire, whose father is the very rich and famous Duke of Holdernesse. Huxtable explains that not only the boy has disappeared, but also the German master, Heidegger, along with his bicycle.

Once in the North, the Duke says to Holmes that he does not think that his estranged wife has anything to do with his son's disappearance, nor has there been a ransom demand. Holmes establishes that the boy and his kidnappers could not have used the nearby road without being seen, suggesting that they went cross-country. As if to confirm this, the police find the boy's school cap in some gypsies' possession. They swear that they simply found it on the moor, but the police lock them up.

Holmes and Dr. Watson go hunting for clues. They find a bicycle track, but it is not Heidegger's; it does not match his tyres. Holmes observes that one tyre has a patch on it. Almost everything observable has been obliterated by cow tracks (which are the only marks on the ground anywhere). Eventually, Heidegger's bicycle tracks are found, and they end where he lies, dead. After that, Holmes and Watson arrive at the Fighting Cock Inn, and meet the innkeeper, Reuben Hayes, who seems startled indeed to hear that Holmes wants to go to Holdernesse Hall, the Duke's nearby house, to tell him news of his son. The two men have lunch there, and Holmes suddenly realises that he and Watson saw many cow tracks out on the moor, but never at any time did they see any cows. Furthermore, the patterns of the hoof prints were quite unusual, suggesting that the cow in question trotted, cantered, and galloped. Holmes and Watson sneak out to Hayes's stable and examine the horse's hooves. As Holmes has expected, there is evidence of recent shoeing, but with old shoes and new nails. Examining the nearby smithy, Holmes and Watson are rather belligerently asked to leave by Mr. Hayes.

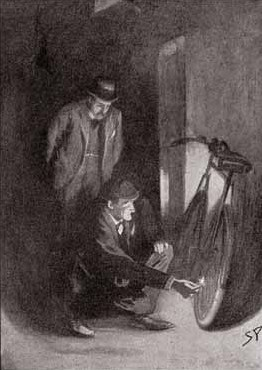
Holmes examines James Wilder's bicycle, 1904 illustration by Sidney Paget

Shortly afterwards, the two men hide as a cyclist comes along the road from the direction of the Duke's. It is James Wilder, the Duke's personal secretary, and he looks agitated. He arrives at the inn. Soon afterwards, a trap pulls out of the stable yard and goes along the road towards Chesterfield. A while later, someone else – it is getting dark and only a fleeting glimpse of the new visitor is caught – arrives at the inn. Coming closer, Holmes observes Wilder's bicycle tyres and notes that they are the same make as the first ones encountered on the moor.

The next morning, they go to Holdernesse Hall, where they find that the Duke is not well. Nevertheless, Holmes demands from him a cheque for £6000 (equivalent to £637,620 in 2025), saying that he has earned the reward. His son is at the Fighting Cock, and the accused is the Duke himself, but the actual mastermind of this crime is James Wilder, who has a terrible secret: He is the illegitimate son of the Duke. He conceived a plan to kidnap Lord Saltire to force the Duke to change his will, knowing very well that his father would not call the police on him, as he abhorred the very idea of scandal. The plan had begun to unravel when Wilder hired Hayes – who has now fled, but been caught on Holmes's information – to do the actual kidnapping. Hayes had killed Heidegger, and when Wilder heard the news, he confessed all to his father. So anxious had been the Duke to avoid scandal, he agreed to let his younger son remain confined at the inn for another three days, and to keep quiet, so that Hayes could flee justice.

All ends well, except for Hayes, who faces the gallows. Lord Saltire is brought home from the inn and the Duke writes to his estranged wife asking her to reconcile with him. This he feels she will be willing to do, for the source of the friction between them is going away: James Wilder is being packed off to Australia to seek his fortune. As for the cow tracks, they were accomplished by shoeing the horses with special shoes shaped like cow's hooves. The shoes were from the Duke's collection of family memorabilia.

The story ends with Holmes receiving the £6000 reward from the Duke for his services, joking "I am a poor man". The next story, "The Adventure of Black Peter", confirms that such a large payment is very unusual for Holmes.

== Publication history ==
"The Adventure of the Priory School" was published in the US in Collier's on 30 January 1904, and in the UK in The Strand Magazine in February 1904. The story was published with six illustrations by Frederic Dorr Steele in Collier's, and with nine illustrations by Sidney Paget in the Strand. It was included in the short story collection The Return of Sherlock Holmes, which was published in the US in February 1905 and in the UK in March 1905.

== Adaptations ==
=== Film and television ===
A silent short film based on the story was released in 1921 as part of the Sherlock Holmes film series by Stoll Pictures. Eille Norwood played Sherlock Holmes and Hubert Willis played Dr. Watson.

The story was dramatised as part of the Granada TV Holmes series starring Jeremy Brett. Set in 1887, however, the revelation of Wilder's parentage and the ending were changed. In the dramatisation, Holmes deduces that Wilder is the illegitimate son of the Duke of Holdernesse after comparing his features with those of each ancestral portrait in the Hall. Also, in this version, Wilder takes Lord Saltire as a hostage in a chase led by Holmes, the Duke and Watson through a cavern under the moor, known as the "Cathedral". Having climbed to the top of a cliff-like structure with the boy, Wilder slips and falls to his death, while Lord Saltire is rescued. Later, the Duke volunteers a reward of £6,000 early on, but in the end, writes Holmes a cheque for £12,000 (equivalent to £1,275,239 in 2025).

=== Radio and audio dramas ===
"The Priory School" was dramatised by Edith Meiser as an episode of the American radio series The Adventures of Sherlock Holmes. The episode aired on 4 May 1931, with Richard Gordon as Sherlock Holmes and Leigh Lovell as Dr. Watson. A remake of the script aired in April 1933.

Meiser also adapted the story for the American radio series The New Adventures of Sherlock Holmes, with Basil Rathbone as Holmes and Nigel Bruce as Watson. An episode adapted from the story aired in January 1940 and another aired in July 1943.

The story was adapted by Michael Hardwick as a radio production that aired on the BBC Light Programme in 1962, as part of the 1952–1969 radio series starring Carleton Hobbs as Holmes and Norman Shelley as Watson.

An adaptation aired on BBC radio in 1978, starring Barry Foster as Holmes and David Buck as Watson. The production was adapted by Michael Bakewell.

"The Adventure of the Priory School" was adapted as an episode of CBS Radio Mystery Theater titled "The Vanishing Herd". The episode, which featured John Beal as Sherlock Holmes and Court Benson as Dr. Watson, first aired in January 1981.

"The Priory School" was dramatised for BBC Radio 4 in 1993, again by Michael Bakewell, as part of the 1989–1998 radio series starring Clive Merrison as Holmes and Michael Williams as Watson. It featured Norman Bird as Dr Huxtable and Nigel Davenport as the Duke.

A 2013 episode of The Classic Adventures of Sherlock Holmes, a series on the American radio show Imagination Theatre, was adapted from the story. John Patrick Lowrie played Holmes with Lawrence Albert as Watson.

In 2025, the podcast Sherlock & Co adapted the story across three episodes titled “The Priory School”.
