= McAllen (surname) =

Origin
- Meaning: Son of Ailean
- Region of origin: Scotland

Other names
- Variant forms: Allen, Allan, Alan

McAllen or MacAllen is a Scottish and Irish surname, originating from Scottish Gaelic. Historically, the name migrated to Ireland, where the prefix of the name has been commonly transposed with "Mc". The first recorded arrivals to Ireland bearing this name came in the 15th century to County Donegal, with the arrival of Gallowglas military families to support the Irish nobility of the north.

The surname McAllen has hereditary connections with the popular surname Allen. The noble family of this surname, from which a branch went to Portugal, is descended from one Alanus de Buckenhall.

Notable people with the surname include:

- Charles McAllen (1860–1924), Australian cricketer
- Kathleen Rowe McAllen (born 1958), American actress

== See also ==
- McAllen, Texas, named after Scottish-American businessman John B McAllen
- Macallan (disambiguation), includes McAllan
