= Macallan (disambiguation) =

Macallan or McAllan may refer to:

== People ==
=== Macallan ===
- Andrew MacAllan, pseudonym of James Leasor (1923–2007), British author
- Jes Macallan, stage name of Jessica Lee Liszewski (born 1982), American actress

=== McAllan ===
- David McAllan (born 1980), Scottish speedway rider
- Màiri McAllan (born 1993), Scottish politician

=== Other ===
- Macculind (died c. 497), early Irish saint who was abbot or bishop of Lusk

== Other uses ==
- The Macallan distillery, a single malt Scotch whisky distillery in Craigellachie, Moray, Scotland

== See also ==
- McAllen (surname)
