= The Adventure of the Solitary Cyclist =

- Short story by Arthur Conan Doyle
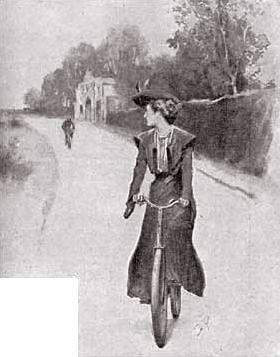
- Violet Smith glances back at the mystery cyclist, 1904 illustration by Sidney Paget

Text available at Wikisource
- Country: United Kingdom
- Language: English
- Genre: Detective fiction short stories

Publication
- Published in: Strand Magazine
- Publication date: December 1903

Chronology
- Series: The Return of Sherlock Holmes
The Adventure of the Dancing Men	The Adventure of the Priory School

"The Adventure of the Solitary Cyclist", one of the 56 Sherlock Holmes short stories written by Sir Arthur Conan Doyle, is one of 13 stories in the cycle collected as The Return of Sherlock Holmes (1905). It was first published in Collier's in the United States on 26 December 1903, and in The Strand Magazine in the United Kingdom in January 1904.

== Plot ==
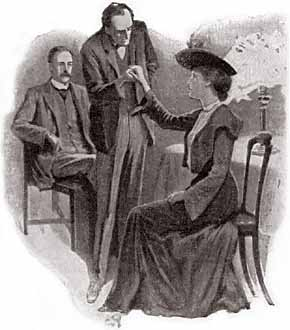
Holmes examines Violet Smith's fingers while Dr. Watson looks on, 1904 illustration by Sidney Paget

Holmes is contacted by Miss Violet Smith of Farnham, Surrey about an unusual turn in her and her mother's lives. Violet's father has recently died and left his wife and daughter rather poor. There was an ad in the news asking about their whereabouts. Answering it, they met Mr. Carruthers and Mr. Woodley, the former a pleasant enough man, but the latter a bullying churl. They had come from South Africa, where they had known Violet's uncle Ralph Smith, who had now also died in poverty and apparently wanted to see that his relatives were provided for. This struck Violet as odd, since she and her family had not heard a word from Smith since his departure for South Africa 25 years ago. Carruthers and Woodley explained that before dying, Ralph had heard of his brother's death and felt responsible for his survivors' welfare.

Carruthers began by offering Violet a job as a live-in music teacher for his ten-year-old daughter at £100 (equivalent to £10,500 in 2025) a year, about twice the going rate. She accepted after Carruthers said that she could visit her mother on weekends. That went well until Mr. Woodley came to stay for a week. He made the most oafish advances to her, and boasted that if Violet married him she would have a life of luxury. He even grabbed her and demanded a kiss, precipitating expulsion by his host, Carruthers. Violet has not seen Woodley since.

The specific thing that has brought Violet to seek Holmes's services, however, is the strange man who follows her on his bicycle as she cycles to and from the railway station for her weekend visits to her mother. The strange man always keeps his distance behind her and disappears without a trace, never letting her near him, and always along the same lonely stretch of road. Violet does not recognise him, but he has a black beard. Holmes asks her about her admirers, and other than Woodley, if he can be styled as such, she can only think of Mr. Carruthers, who, although a perfect gentleman at all times, seems attracted to her.

After Violet leaves, Holmes observes that it is odd that a household would pay £100 a year for a music teacher but be too cheap to pay for a horse and trap. He sends Dr. Watson to Surrey to see what he can find out. This turns out to be virtually nothing, except to establish that the lady's story is true, and that the mystery man comes out of and goes back into a local house, Charlington Hall. Holmes upbraids Watson for his lackluster results. They also receive a letter from Violet the next day saying that Carruthers has proposed to her, but she had to refuse since she is already engaged to a man named Cyril Morton, an electrical engineer in Coventry.

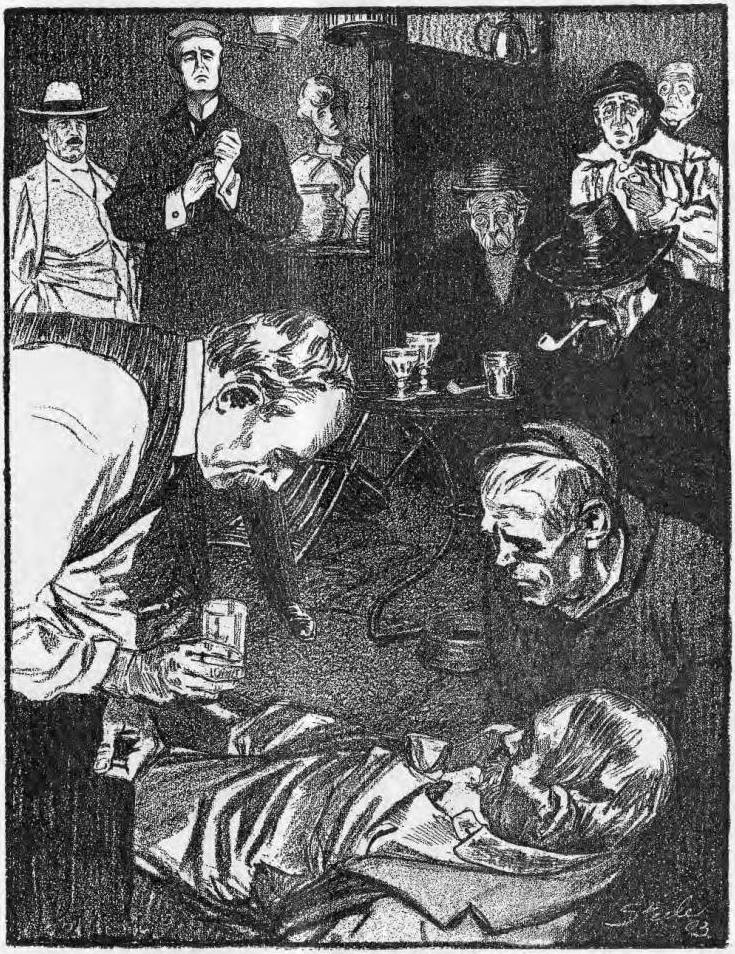
Holmes fights Woodley in a pub, 1903 illustration by Frederic Dorr Steele in Collier's

Holmes goes to Surrey himself, and gets into a fight in a pub for his troubles; when he returns and tells Watson what happened, he actually considers his experience in Surrey to be hilarious. It seems that Mr. Woodley was in the taproom at the pub and heard his name mentioned in conversation. He came out and demanded to know who Holmes was and what he wanted. The discussion escalated to violence; Holmes emerged with a few bruises, whereas Woodley had to be carried home. The innkeeper merely mentioned that Woodley is a regular weekend guest at Charlington Hall, which is rented by Williamson, who, rumour has it, is a clergyman.

Holmes returns to 221B Baker Street with his face somewhat marred, and another letter arrives from Violet, saying that her situation has become impossible owing to Mr. Carruthers's proposals, and Mr. Woodley's reappearance. She is quitting. Holmes knows that some intrigue is afoot, and he tells Watson that they must get themselves to Surrey to see that Violet makes it to the station. Carruthers has at last acquired a trap, and she need not ride her bicycle this time.

Failing to realise that Violet might take an earlier train than usual, Holmes discovers that he is too late to meet Violet. The trap comes along the road, but by the time it does, no one is in it: Violet has been abducted. Holmes and Watson board the empty trap in an attempt to go after the kidnappers. They come face-to-face with the mysterious cyclist, who pulls a revolver on them; however, both parties quickly realise that they are on the same side – both have Violet's welfare in mind. The cyclist declares that the abductors are Woodley and Williamson. He evidently knows something of the intrigue.

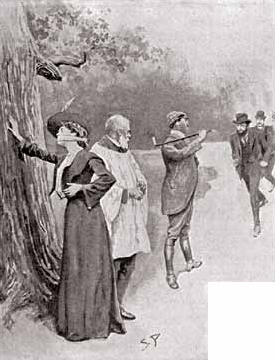
Carruthers and Holmes stopping the wedding, 1904 illustration by Sidney Paget

The group first find an unconscious groom, who was driving the trap, in the bushes, and then they find all three persons that they have been seeking on the Charlington Hall grounds, with the apparently defrocked clergyman performing a wedding ceremony between the other two. The bride is somewhat unwilling, judging from the gag over her mouth. Woodley's boast of having married Violet leads the mysterious cyclist, unmasking himself as Carruthers, to pull out his revolver and shoot Woodley, wounding him.

The intrigue does indeed involve Uncle Ralph in South Africa. He was dying when Carruthers and Woodley left; far from being penniless at his death, it is revealed that in reality, Uncle Ralph had amassed a large fortune. As he was illiterate, he would surely die intestate, and therefore Violet would inherit his wealth as Ralph's next of kin. The two crooks made their way to England in the hopes that one of them would get to marry Violet – Woodley having won the chance in a card game on the ship – and they had to draw Williamson into the plot, promising him a share of the fortune. The plan went awry when first, Woodley proved to be a brute, and next, Carruthers fell in love with Violet, and thereafter wanted nothing to do with his former confederates. He took to disguising himself and following her as she rode her bicycle past Charlington Hall, where he knew Woodley and Williamson might be lying in wait for her.

Woodley and Williamson are each sentenced to lengthy prison terms, but Carruthers only gets a few months due to Woodley's less-than-savory reputation. Holmes reassures Carruthers the "marriage" performed by Williamson was void; not only was it performed against Violet's will, but Williamson had been unfrocked and therefore had no authority to legalise a marriage. Violet inherits her uncle's fortune and marries Cyril, who eventually rises to the position of senior partner in a large electrical firm.

== Publication history ==
"The Adventure of the Solitary Cyclist" was published in the US in Collier's on 26 December 1903, and in the UK in The Strand Magazine in January 1904. The story was published with five illustrations by Frederic Dorr Steele in Collier's, and with seven illustrations by Sidney Paget in the Strand. It was included in the short story collection The Return of Sherlock Holmes, which was published in the US in February 1905 and in the UK in March 1905.

The first version of the story was refused by the editor of The Strand Magazine because Holmes was not very involved in the plot.

Conan Doyle was not very pleased with the story and believed that the first three stories of The Return of Sherlock Holmes ("The Adventure of the Empty House", "The Adventure of the Norwood Builder", and "The Adventure of the Dancing Men") were better than this story. He also commits a lapse in the narrative when he explicitly mentions Violet Smith's visit to Holmes occurring on Saturday, 23 April 1895; 23 April that year fell on a Tuesday.

== Adaptations ==
=== Film and television ===
The story was adapted as a 1921 short silent film in the Stoll film series starring Eille Norwood as Sherlock Holmes.

The story was adapted for the 1968 BBC series with Peter Cushing. The episode is now lost.

The Granada TV version with Jeremy Brett was relatively faithful to the original story; however, it has a comic relief ending when Holmes's chemical experiment causes the flat to fill up with smoke, and brings the fire brigade to the scene. (The chemical experiment – without smoke – is from "The Adventure of the Naval Treaty".)

In 2001, "Murder Rooms: Mysteries of the Real Sherlock Holmes" starring Charles Edwards and Ian Richardson, did an episode entitled "The Patient's Eyes" which involves a female cyclist being followed by a mysterious figure and implies the source of the story "The Solitary Cyclist."

=== Radio and audio dramas ===
The story was adapted by Edith Meiser as an episode of the American radio series The Adventures of Sherlock Holmes. The episode aired on 27 April 1931, with Richard Gordon as Sherlock Holmes and Leigh Lovell as Dr. Watson. A remake of the script aired on 20 June 1936 (with Gordon as Holmes and Harry West as Watson).

Meiser also adapted the story for the American radio series The New Adventures of Sherlock Holmes, with Basil Rathbone as Holmes and Nigel Bruce as Watson. The episode aired on 26 October 1941.

John Gielgud played Sherlock Holmes and Ralph Richardson played Watson in a radio adaptation of the story that aired on 30 November 1954 on the BBC Light Programme. The production also aired on NBC radio on 27 February 1955.

Michael Hardwick adapted the story for the BBC Light Programme as part of the 1952–1969 radio series starring Carleton Hobbs as Holmes and Norman Shelley as Watson. It aired in 1964.

An adaptation of the story aired on BBC radio in 1978, starring Barry Foster as Holmes and David Buck as Watson. It was adapted by Michael Bakewell.

"The Solitary Cyclist" was dramatised for BBC Radio 4 in 1993 by Bert Coules as part of the 1989–1998 radio series starring Clive Merrison as Holmes and Michael Williams as Watson, and features Denis Quilley as Bob Carruthers, Susannah Harker as Violet Smith, David Holt as Jack Woodley, and Peter Penry-Jones as Williamson.

The story was adapted as a 2015 episode of The Classic Adventures of Sherlock Holmes, a series on the American radio show Imagination Theatre, starring John Patrick Lowrie as Holmes and Lawrence Albert as Watson.

In 2024, the podcast Sherlock & Co. adapted the story in a two-episode adventure called "The Solitary Cyclist", starring Harry Attwell as Holmes and Paul Waggott as Watson..
