= McSorley =

McSorley and MacSorley are surnames in the English language. The names are Anglicised forms of the Gaelic Mac Somhairle.

== People with the surname ==
McSorley

- Catherine Mary MacSorley (1848–1929), Irish writer
- Charles MacSorley (1895–1976), Canadian politician
- Chris McSorley (born 1962), Canadian ice hockey coach and executive
- Cisco McSorley (born 1950), Democratic member of the New Mexico senate
- Ernest M. McSorley (1912–1975), last captain of the ill-fated Laker-type freighter SS Edmund Fitzgerald
- Fred MacSorley (fl. 2011), medical doctor from Northern Ireland
- Gerard McSorley (born 1950), Irish theatre, television and film actor
- Jade McSorley (born 1988), English model
- Jean McSorley, English/Australian anti-nuclear campaigner
- John McSorley (born 1941), English athlete
- Marty McSorley (born 1963), Canadian professional ice-hockey player
- Mary McSorley, Irish nationalist politician
- Richard McSorley (1914–2002), American Jesuit priest, peace activist and writer
- Tom McSorley, Canadian film critic and scholar
- Trace McSorley (born 1995), American professional football quarterback
- Trick McSorley (1852–1936), American professional baseball player

== Places ==
- McSorley Hill, a K30 ski jumping hill located in Red Wing, Minnesota, United States, opened in 1887.

== See also ==
- McSorley's Old Ale House
- Dubhghall mac Ruaidhrí, (died 1268), Norse-Gaelic monarch, sometimes known as Mac Sorley
