= Hamish =

- Pronunciation: /ˈheɪ.mɪʃ/
- Gender: Masculine
- Language: English, Scots

Origin
- Origin: Seumas (voc. Sheumais)

Other names
- See also: James, Jacob

Hamish is a masculine given name of Scottish origin. It represents a phonetic rendering of Sheumais (pronounced [ˈheːmɪʃ]), the vocative form of Seumas, which is the Gaelic equivalent of James. It was popularised in the 19th century by the novels of William Black (1841–1898), which feature several characters bearing this name.

Outside Scotland, it has gained popularity in Australia and New Zealand, where it ranks among the top 200 and 300 boys' names respectively, reflecting the influence of Scottish immigration. It is also occasionally found in Canada, South Africa, and other Commonwealth countries, though it remains less common in the United States.

== People ==
=== Given name ===
- Hamish Bennett, retired New Zealand cricketer
- Hamish Bennett (director), New Zealand filmmaker
- Hamish Blake (born 1981), Australian comedian and radio presenter
- Hamish Bond (born 1986), New Zealand Olympic rower
- Hamish Bowles (born 1963), European editor-at-large for Vogue
- Hamish Brown, writer and mountain walker
- Hamish Carter (born 1971), Olympic gold medallist triathlete from New Zealand
- Hamish Clark (born 1965), Scottish actor
- Hamish Falconer (born 1985), British politician and diplomat
- Hamish Forbes, 7th Baronet (1916–2007), British Army major
- Hamish Fraser, Scottish Catholic journalist and activist
- Hamish Glencross (born 1978), heavy metal guitarist for the band My Dying Bride
- Hamish Harding (1964–2023), British businessman
- Hamish Harding (rower) (born 1999), Australian rower
- Hamish Henderson (1919–2002), Scottish singer and collector of folk music
- Hamish Imlach (1940-1996), Scottish folk singer
- Hamish Kerr, New Zealand athlete
- Hamish Kilgour, New Zealand musician in the band The Clean
- Hamish Linklater, American actor
- Hamish MacCunn (1868–1916), Scottish composer and musician
- Hamish Marshall (born 1979), New Zealand cricketer
- Hamish McAlpine (born 1948), Scottish footballer
- Hamish MacDonald (disambiguation), several people
- Hamish McKay, New Zealand television presenter
- Hamish Meldrum (born 1948), British doctor
- Hamish Milne, British pianist
- Hamish Moore, Scottish maker, musician and teacher
- Hamish Munro (1915–1994), Scottish biochemist
- Hamish Peacock Australian athlete
- Hamish Pepper New Zealand sailor
- Hamish Purdy, Canadian movie set decorator
- Hamish Rosser, drummer of Australian band the Vines
- Hamish Rutherford (born 1989), New Zealand cricketer
- Hamish Stuart (born 1949), lead singer of Average White Band
- Hamish Wallace (born 1956), Scottish paediatric oncologist
- Hamish Wilson, Scottish actor

=== Nickname ===
- Hamish Dawson (1925–2007), Scottish rugby union player
- Hamish Kemp (1933–2002), Scottish rugby union player
- Hamish Mahaddie (1911–1997), Scottish officer in the Royal Air Force during the Second World War
- Hamish Stothard (1913–1997), Scottish middle-distance runner

== Animals ==
- Hamish McHamish, famous "cat about town" in St Andrews, Scotland

== Fictional characters ==
- John H. Watson, a character in Sherlock Holmes stories; his middle name is unknown in the original stories, but is given as Hamish in many non-canon Holmes pastiches and adaptations
- Hamish and Dougal, comedy characters from Radio 4 series I'm Sorry I Haven't a Clue
- Hamish Macbeth, a detective in a series of novels and television adaptation starring Robert Carlyle as the eponymous hero
- Hot Shot Hamish and Mighty Mouse, two former British football-themed comic strips
- Hamish, in the Nickelodeon TV show Mr. Meaty

== Other ==
- List of storms named Hamish, tropical cyclones with the name
