= Hamish Wallace =

Hamish Wallace MBBS MD FRCS FRCP, FRCPCH
- Born: William Hamish Beith Wallace; 25 August 1956 (age 69); Edinburgh, Scotland
- Education: St George's, University of London
- Spouse: Elizabeth (Libby) née Wotherspoon Wallace

William Hamish Beith Wallace (born 25 October 1956) was a consultant paediatric oncologist at the Royal Hospital for Sick Children, Edinburgh. He was a trustee of Clic Sargent (now known as Young Lives vs Cancer) from 2008 to 2011, national clinical director of the NHS Scotland Managed Service Network for Children and Young People with Cancer in Scotland from 2015 to 2019, and twice president of the european network for paediatric Hodgkin lymphoma (2010-14 and 2018- 2022).

He is author of four books and over 250 peer reviewed publications.

== Life ==
Hamish Wallace was born in Edinburgh to William Wallace and Joan née Beith Wallace. Wallace attended firstly Gillsland Park School until the age of 11, followed by Oundle School in Northamptonshire, later graduating from St George's, University of London, University of London, in 1980. Wallace undertook his clinical training in paediatric oncology at Great Ormond Street Hospital, the University of Birmingham Medical School and the Royal Hospital for Sick Children, Edinburgh. Wallace was awarded a Leukaemia Research Fund Research Fellowship with his consultant being Stephen Shalet at the University of Manchester and the Royal Manchester Children's Hospital, in the late 1980s. It was during this period, that he developed an interest in the late endocrine effects of the treatment of childhood cancer.

In 2004, Hamish married Elizabeth Wotherspoon. They have three children, and currently reside in North Berwick where Hamish is Chair of the North Berwick Trust.
