= Dr. Watson =

Fictional character, associate and friend of Sherlock Holmes

- Sherlock Holmes character
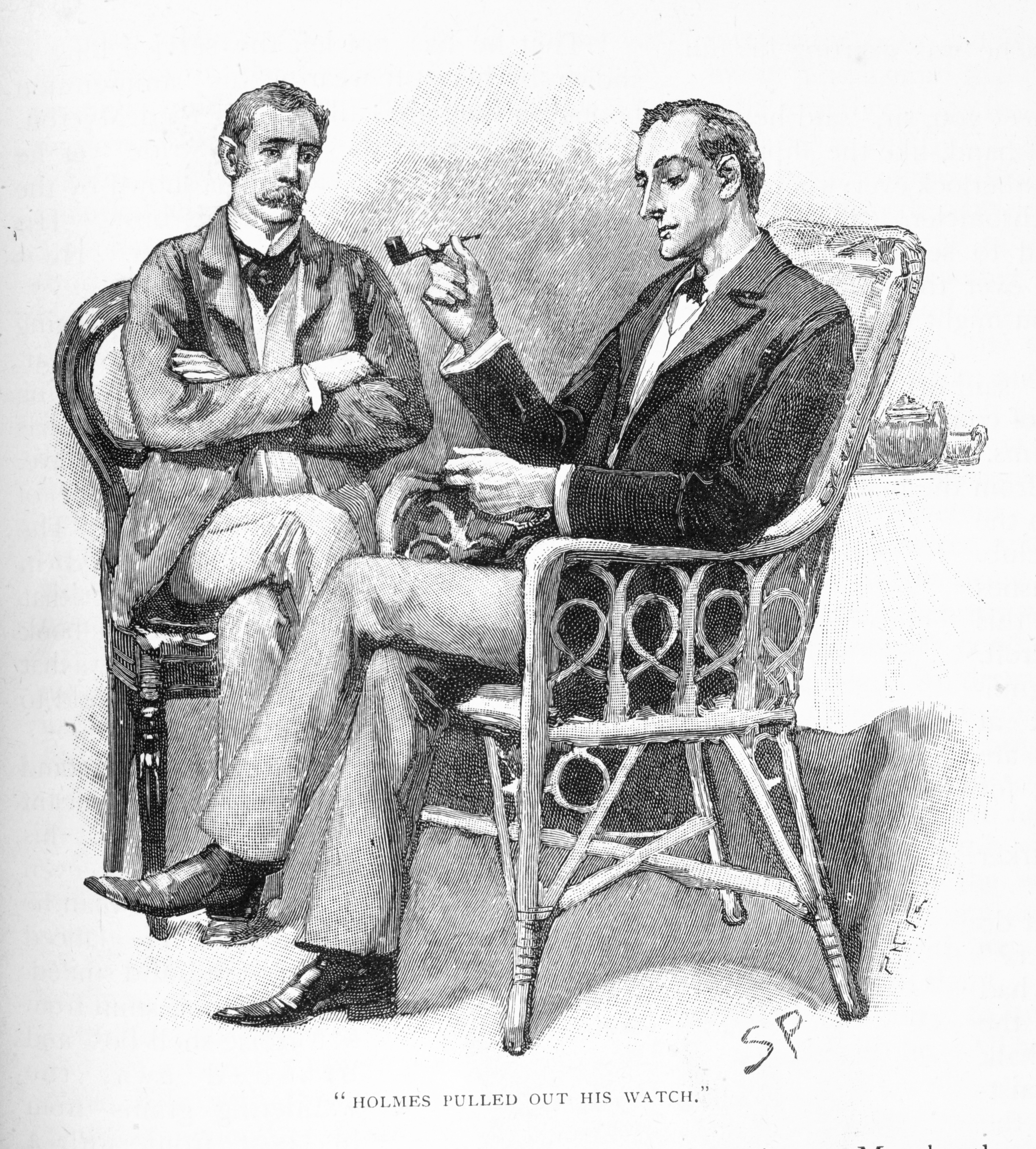
- Dr. Watson (left) and Sherlock Holmes, by Sidney Paget
- First appearance: A Study in Scarlet (1887)
- Last appearance: "The Adventure of the Retired Colourman" (1927, canon)
- Created by: Arthur Conan Doyle

In-universe information
- Full name: John H. Watson
- Title: Doctor
- Occupation: Physician, writer, pre-British Army surgeon, private detective
- Family: H. Watson Sr. (father; deceased); H. Watson Jr. (brother; deceased)
- Spouses: Mary Morstan (deceased); Unnamed second wife
- Nationality: British
- Alma mater: University of London

Dr. John H. Watson is a fictional character in the Sherlock Holmes stories by Sir Arthur Conan Doyle. As Holmes's friend and confidant, and the narrator of almost the entire series, Watson has appeared in various films, television series, video games, comics and radio programmes.

Along with Sherlock Holmes, Dr. Watson first appeared in the novel A Study in Scarlet (1887). "The Adventure of Shoscombe Old Place" (1927) is the last work of Doyle featuring Watson and Holmes, although their last appearance in the canonical timeline is in "His Last Bow" (1917).

== Character creation ==
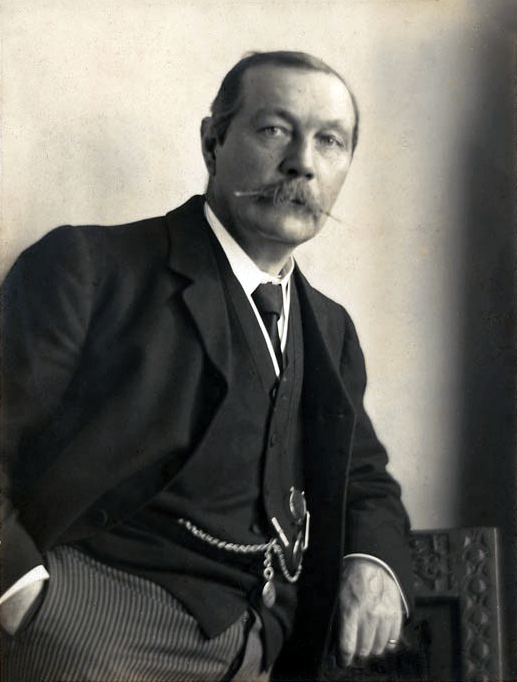
Sir Arthur Conan Doyle (1859–1930), creator of Sherlock Holmes and Dr. Watson. Photo from 1914.

In Doyle's early rough plot outlines, Holmes's associate was named "Ormond Sacker" before Doyle finally settled on "John Watson". He was probably inspired by one of his young colleagues, Dr James Watson.

Watson shares some similarities with the narrator of Edgar Allan Poe's stories about fictional detective C. Auguste Dupin, created in 1841, but unlike Watson, Poe's narrator remains unnamed.

== Fictional character biography ==
Watson's first name is mentioned on only four occasions. Part one of the first Sherlock Holmes story, A Study in Scarlet, is subtitled Being a reprint from the Reminiscences of John H. Watson, M.D., Late of the Army Medical Department. The preface of the collection His Last Bow is signed "John H. Watson, M.D.", and in "The Problem of Thor Bridge", Watson says that his dispatch box is labelled "John H. Watson, M.D." His wife Mary Watson appears to refer to him as "James" in "The Man with the Twisted Lip"; Dorothy L. Sayers speculated that Mary may be using his middle name Hamish (an Anglicisation of Sheumais, the vocative form of Seumas, the Scottish Gaelic for James), though Doyle himself never addresses this beyond including the initial. David W. Merrell, on the other hand, concludes that Mary is not referring to her husband at all but rather to (the surname of) their servant.

The year of Watson's birth is not stated in the stories. William S. Baring-Gould and Leslie S. Klinger estimate that Watson was born in 1852 without providing any textual evidence. June Thomson concludes that Watson was probably born either in 1852 or 1853. According to Thomson, most commentators after Baring-Gould accept 1852 as the year of Watson's birth. However, many early scholars consider that Watson was born in 1855. As circumstantial evidence, considering Watson's family background, he likely earned his medical doctorate at age 23. Holmes frequently addresses Watson with terms used for a junior ("my boy" and "my dear boy"), whereas Watson reciprocates with terms typically used for an equal or an elder ("old man"). At 221B, Holmes manages Watson's checkbook and keeps his affairs in order, something a paterfamilias would traditionally do.

In A Study in Scarlet, Watson is the narrator. He states that he had studied at St Bartholomew's Hospital in London, receiving his degree of Doctor of Medicine from the University of London in 1878 with further training at Netley as an assistant surgeon in the British Army. (In Doyle's short pastiche "The Field Bazaar", Watson is described as having received his Bachelor of Medicine from Doyle's alma mater, Edinburgh University; this would probably have been in 1874-1876.) He was sent to India with the 5th (Northumberland Fusiliers) Regiment of Foot before being attached to the 66th (Berkshire) Regiment of Foot. Watson saw service as a non-combatant (in the British army of 1880, medical officers held no military rank and did not take part in combat) in the Second Anglo-Afghan War and, one year later, he was wounded at the Battle of Maiwand by a jezail bullet, (Note: Also known as a Jazail, Jazair, or Janjal, a Jezail was a very large flintlock or matchlock musket, with a barrel up to 8 feet (2 m) long. They often fired a .50 or .75-inch calibre bullet weighing up to 2 ounces (57 g).see Butalia (1998), p. 52. They were accurate at long range and often used as a sniper's weapon in warfare. Watson's wound was contradictorily located in his leg and his shoulder, depending on the story.) suffered enteric fever and was sent back to England on the troopship HMS Orontes following his recovery. With his health ruined, Watson was then awarded a daily pension of 11 shillings and 6 pence (Note: A daily pension of 11 s 6 d is around £60 daily in 2025 money, when adjusted for inflation. This daily amount was roughly equivalent to an agricultural labourer's weekly wage at the time, according to British Labour Statistics: Historical Abstracts, 1886–1968, Department of Employment and Productivity, 1981, cited in "Average Weekly Cash Wages paid to Ordinary Agricultural Labourers" at Relative Value of Sums of Money.) for nine months.

In 1881, after returning to England, Watson lives for a time on the Strand, a street famous for theatres. After squandering his funds, he sought his fortunes at the Criterion, where he encounters Stamford, who introduces him to Holmes, who is looking for someone to share rent in rooms in 221B Baker Street. Concluding that they are compatible, they subsequently move in. Watson views Holmes as a mystery to be studied, harboring a profound curiosity about him. When Watson notices multiple eccentric guests frequenting the rooms, Holmes reveals that he is a "consulting detective" and that the guests are his clients.

At the beginning of A Study in Scarlet, Watson states he had "neither kith nor kin in England", "and was therefore as free as air". In The Sign of the Four, Watson reveals that his father and older brother are deceased, and that both had the same first name beginning with "H" after Holmes examines an old watch in Watson's possession, which was formerly his father's before it was inherited by his brother. Holmes estimates the watch to have a value of 50 guineas. (Note: Fifty guineas is around £5519 in 2025 money, when adjusted for inflation. This was more than a year's wages for a servant or manual labourer at the time.) Holmes deduced from the watch that Watson's brother was "a man of untidy habits—very untidy and careless. He was left with good prospects, but he threw away his chances, lived for some time in poverty with occasional short intervals of prosperity, and finally, taking to drink, he died". Holmes explains his reasoning: the initials on the watch, "H. W.", as well as the 50-year-old date of the watch, tell Holmes that it had belonged to Watson's father, who naturally had the same surname, and was passed down to Watson's elder brother, whose carelessness is clear to Holmes from the fact that the outside of the watchcase is dented from being in the same pocket with coins and keys. Holmes deduced that the elder Watson's good prospects he must have inherited substantial wealth as well as the watch. The brother's poverty is evidenced by multiple pawnbroker's marks inside the watch case: inside the watch case are four claim numbers scratched by pawnbrokers. Holmes also infers the brother's prosperity from the fact he was able to redeem the watch on several occasions. Holmes explains to Watson finally that the brother's heavy drinking was demonstrated by multiple scratches around the watch's winding hole are scratches from the key—an unsteady drunkard's hand trying to wind the watch at night.

Watson witnesses Holmes's skills of deduction on their first case together concerning a series of murders related to Mormon intrigue. When Holmes solves the case, Watson is frustrated that Holmes is not given any credit for it in the press. When Holmes refuses to record and publish his own account of the adventure, Watson endeavours to do so himself. In time, Holmes and Watson become close friends.

In The Sign of the Four, Watson becomes engaged to Mary Morstan, a governess. In "The Adventure of the Empty House", a reference by Watson to "my own sad bereavement" implies that Morstan has died by the time Holmes returns after faking his death. "The Adventure of the Norwood Builder" supports this implication with a statement that Watson has sold his medical practice and begun sharing rooms with Holmes on Baker Street again. In "The Adventure of the Blanched Soldier" set in January 1903, Holmes mentions that "Watson had at that time deserted me for a wife", but this wife was never named or described.

In His Last Bow, set in 1914 on the eve of World War I, Holmes notes that Watson (who would then be in his late 50s-early 60s) is "joining up with [his] old service", and they spend a "few minutes" in what Holmes described as possibly "the last quiet talk that [they] shall ever have."

=== Watson as Holmes's biographer ===
Throughout Doyle's novels, Watson is presented as Holmes's biographer. At the end of the first published Holmes story, A Study in Scarlet, Watson is so displeased by Scotland Yard claiming full credit for its solution that he exclaims: "Your merits should be publicly recognised. You should publish an account of the case. If you won't, I will for you". Holmes calmly responds, "You may do what you like, Doctor". Subsequently, Watson consoles Holmes by quoting Horace's Satires:

'Never mind,' I answered; 'I have all the facts in my journal, and the public shall know them. In the meantime you must make yourself contented by the consciousness of success, like the Roman miser:

'"Populus me sibilat, at mihi plaudo

Ipse domi simul ac nummos contemplor in arca."'

— A Study in Scarlet

Thus, the story is presented as "a reprint from the reminiscences of John H. Watson", and most other stories of the series share this by implication.Watson emerges not as a mere scribe, but as a shaping intelligence behind the atmosphere. He consciously mediates between the raw, often unyielding data of detection and the demands of dramatic art, curating the memoirs to capture both the cerebral brilliance of his friend and the textured reality of human experience.

In the first chapter of The Sign of the Four, Holmes comments on Watson's first effort as a biographer: "I glanced over it. Honestly, I cannot congratulate you upon it. Detection is, or ought to be, an exact science and should be treated in the same cold and unemotional manner. You have attempted to tinge it with romanticism... The only point in the case which deserved mention was the curious analytical reasoning from effects to causes, by which I succeeded in unravelling it", whereupon Watson admits, "I was annoyed at this criticism of a work which had been specially designed to please him. I confess, too, that I was irritated by the egotism which seemed to demand that every line of my pamphlet should be devoted to his own special doings".

Watson values intellectual elegance and the psychological theater of the resolution above shock value, as he says in The Adventure of the Solitary Cyclist, "I shall, however, preserve my former rule, and give the preference to those cases which derive their interest not so much from the brutality of the crime as from the ingenuity and dramatic quality of the solution." He excels at stirring suspense and inviting readers to participate in the process of solving the mystery: "The story has, I believe, been told more than once in the newspapers, but, like all such narratives, its effect is much less striking when set forth en bloc in a single half-column of print than when the facts slowly evolve before your own eyes, and the mystery clears gradually away as each new discovery furnishes a step which leads on to the complete truth." (The Adventure of the Engineer's Thumb)

In "The Adventure of Silver Blaze", Holmes confesses that "I made a blunder, my dear Watson—which is, I am afraid, a more common occurrence than anyone would think who only knew me through your memoirs." In The Hound of the Baskervilles, chapters 5–6, Holmes says: "Watson, Watson, if you are an honest man you will record this also and set it against my successes!" Nonetheless, in his prologue to "The Adventure of the Yellow Face", Watson himself remarks, "In publishing these short sketches [of Holmes's cases] ... it is only natural that I should dwell rather upon his successes than upon his failures."

With all his artistic sensibility, Watson transforms raw human experience into compelling literature:

Then he told the story, which I would repeat in this way. His hard, dry statement needs some little editing to soften it into the terms of real life.

— The Adventure of the Illustrious Client

Young Overton's face assumed the bothered look of the man who is more accustomed to using his muscles than his wits; but by degrees, with many repetitions and obscurities which I may omit from his narrative, he laid his strange story before us.

— The Adventure of the Missing Three-Quarter

Sometimes Watson seems determined to stop publishing stories about Holmes. For example, in "The Adventure of the Second Stain", Watson declares that he had intended the previous story ("The Adventure of the Abbey Grange") "to be the last of those exploits of my friend, Mr Sherlock Holmes, which I should ever communicate to the public." However, Watson later decides that "this long series of episodes should culminate in the most important international case which he has ever been called upon to handle" ("The Second Stain" being that case). Despite this, Watson subsequently presents twenty further cases in his stories. The public knows from the stories that Watson is Holmes's partner; the Prime Minister appeals to both Holmes and Watson's patriotism when revealing the details of the secret letter in "The Second Stain".

In the tales written after Holmes's retirement (c. 1903–04), Watson repeatedly refers to "notes of many hundreds of cases to which I have never alluded" on the grounds that after Holmes's retirement, the detective showed reluctance "to the continued publication of his experiences. So long as he was in actual professional practice the records of his successes were of some practical value to him, but since he has definitely retired...notoriety has become hateful to him" ("The Adventure of the Second Stain"). After Holmes retires, Watson often cites special permission from his friend for the publication of further stories but also receives occasional unsolicited suggestions from Holmes as to what stories to tell, noted at the beginning of "The Adventure of the Devil's Foot".

In "The Adventure of the Blanched Soldier", one of only two stories narrated by Holmes himself, the detective remarks about Watson: "I have often had occasion to point out to him how superficial are his accounts and to accuse him of pandering to popular taste instead of confining himself rigidly to facts and figures", and "Alas, that I should have to show my hand so when I tell my own story! It was by concealing such links in the chain that Watson was enabled to produce his meretricious finales." Holmes confesses that Watson would have been the better choice to write the story, noting when he starts writing that he quickly realizes the importance of presenting the tale in a manner that would interest the reader. In any case, Holmes regularly refers to Watson as "my biographer", and once exclaims, "I am lost without my Boswell". According to Clausson, Holmes's simple, empirical, and unimaginative account of the events, and Watson's complex, impressionistic, and highly imaginative narrative, exemplify the two conflicting genres of this series: the ratiocinative detective story and Gothic fiction.

At the beginning of "The Adventure of the Veiled Lodger", Watson makes claims about "the discretion and high sense of professional honour" that govern his work as Holmes's biographer, but this does not keep Watson from expressing his emotions and quoting Holmes with candour regarding their antagonists and their clients. In "The Red-Headed League", for example, Watson introduces Jabez Wilson by commenting, "Our visitor bore every mark of being an average commonplace British tradesman, obese, pompous, and slow"—wearing "a not over-clean black frock-coat".

== Personal characteristics ==
=== Physical appearance ===
In A Study in Scarlet, having just returned from Afghanistan in his 20s, Watson is described as "as thin as a lath and as brown as a nut." After marriage, when he is about 40 years old, he is variously described as strongly built, of a stature either average or slightly above average, with a thick neck and a small moustache. Contrary to the popular impression produced by adaptations, Watson is extremely good-looking, considering that he is described as having "natural advantages", and with his "soft whispering", every lady would like to be his helper and accomplice in The Adventure of the Retired Colourman. Watson mentions in "The Adventure of the Sussex Vampire" (1924) that he used to play rugby union for Blackheath in his middle school, but he fears his physical condition has declined since that point. In "His Last Bow", set in August 1914, Watson is described as "...a heavily built, elderly man with a grey moustache...".

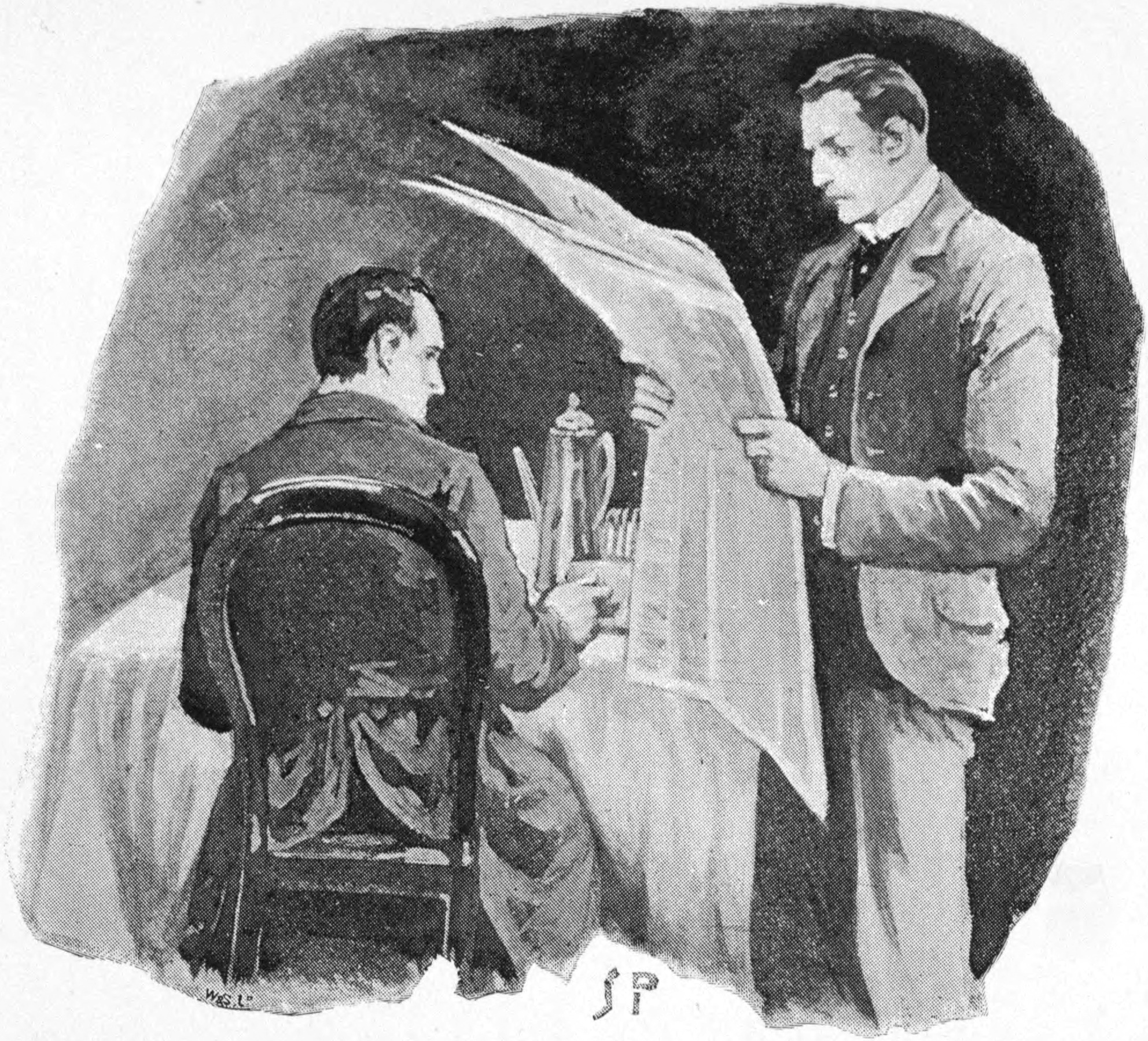
Watson reading bad news to Holmes in "The Five Orange Pips". One of Sidney Paget's iconic illustrations from The Strand magazine.

=== Skills and personality ===
Watson is intelligent, curious and imaginative, if lacking in Holmes's power of reasoning, and serves as a perfect foil for Holmes: the archetypal late Victorian/Edwardian gentleman against the brilliant, emotionally detached analytical machine. At the same time, Watson is much more romantic and emotionally expressive than a common stoic gentleman, and he has the insightful perception to discern which issues were of paramount importance, which makes him a good chronicler of Holmes's legend. Watson has a Bohemian nature, which may explain his affinity with the Bohemian artists portrayed in Murger's Scènes de la vie de bohème (This also suggests that Watson has fairly fluency in French). Watson takes a lively interest in the literature and arts, so he often turns to reading as a source of both pleasure and recreation while Holmes is working. Holmes points out more than once that Watson's writing skills provided a great deal of help in promoting his detective career:

And here it is that I miss my Watson. By cunning questions and ejaculations of wonder he could elevate my simple art, which is but systematized common sense, into a prodigy. When I tell my own story I have no such aid.

— The Adventure of the Blanched Soldier

Furthermore, he is considered an excellent doctor, especially by Holmes. For instance, in "The Adventure of the Dying Detective", Holmes creates a ruse that he is deathly ill to lure a suspect to his presence, which must fool Watson as well during its enactment. To that effect, in addition to elaborate makeup and starving himself for a few days for the necessary appearance, Holmes firmly claims to Watson that he is highly contagious to the touch, knowing full well that the doctor would immediately deduce his true medical condition upon examination.

Watson modestly frames his limitations through his characteristic humility:

Holmes was a man of habits... and I had become one of them... a comrade... upon whose nerve he could place some reliance... a whetstone for his mind. I stimulated him... If I irritated him by a certain methodical slowness in my mentality, that irritation served only to make his own flame-like intuitions and impressions flash up the more vividly and swiftly. Such was my humble role in our alliance.

— The Adventure of the Creeping Man

This is certainly a self-effacing enough statement, but as Philip A. Shreffler observes, it's hard to see how this modest fellow with a "methodically slow mind" could ever serve to stimulate Sherlock Holmes, or, for that matter, compose the fifty-four short stories and four novels of the Holmes Canon with the rare insight and perceptivity with which Watson is clearly gifted.

The solution to this dilemma lies in Watson's psychological inclination toward the irrational that supplements Holmes's cold reason. The result is that the reader is presented with a coherent vision of a world carefully balanced between the rigorous logic of the head and the passion of the heart. In fact, it is as the narrator and presumptive author of the Holmes stories that Watson puts his emotionalism to work, in the process revealing something of the great detective's thoughts and even his feelings. To refer to Watson merely as the chronicler of Holmes's cases is misleading, for it is Watson as author who chooses the details of his friend's life and career that he will use in his stories. If Watson's bent were simply toward a well-paced adventure yarn, he would not take the time that he does to enrich the tapestry of life at 221B Baker Street for his readers, by including those many private glimpses into the detective's heart. There are many other moments in Watson's tales during which Holmes is caught by the doctor with a chink in his rational armor, and it's Watson's sensitivity that reveals them to the reader. He is motivated to report these moments because of his own emotional passion—and by his realization that a Holmes without emotion is an automaton, as much as a Watson without insight cannot be a writer.

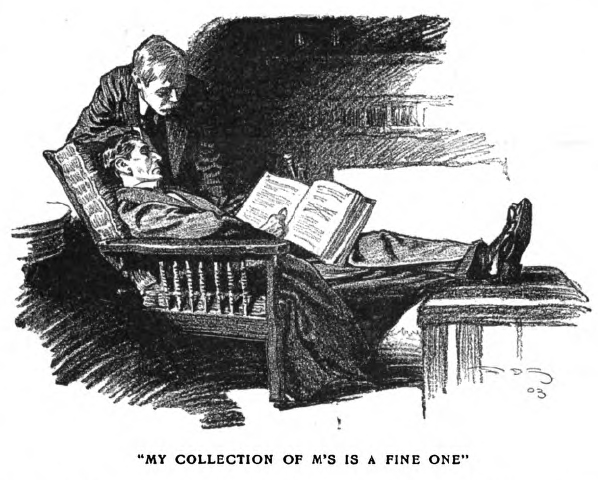
Watson and Holmes in a Frederic Dorr Steele's illustration for "The Adventure of the Empty House"

Watson sometimes attempts to solve crimes on his own. For example, in The Hound of the Baskervilles, Watson intuitively clears up several of the many mysteries confronting the pair, including Barrymore's strange candle movements turning out to be signals to his brother-in-law Seldan, and Holmes praises him for his zeal and intelligence. However, because he is not endowed with Holmes's almost-superhuman ability to focus on the essential details of the case and Holmes's extraordinary range of recondite, specialised knowledge, Watson meets with limited success in other cases. Holmes summed up the problem that Watson confronted in one memorable rebuke from "A Scandal in Bohemia": "Quite so... you see, but you do not observe." In "The Adventure of the Solitary Cyclist," Watson's attempts to assist Holmes's investigation prove unsuccessful because of his inefficient approach, for example, asking a London estate agent who lives in a particular country residence. (According to Holmes, what he should have done was "gone to the nearest public house" and listened to the gossip.) Watson is too guileless to be a proper detective. And yet, as Holmes acknowledges, Watson has unexpected depths about him; for example, he has a definite strain of "pawky humour", as Holmes observes in The Valley of Fear.

While Watson can occasionally grasp the underlying truth through literary metaphors, he frequently overlooks concrete, practical details:

"I had hardly entered the gateway before I saw Mr. Amberley coming down the drive. I only had a glimpse of him this morning, and he certainly gave me the impression of a strange creature, but when I saw him in full light his appearance was even more abnormal."

"I have, of course, studied it, and yet I should be interested to have your impression." said Holmes.

"He seemed to me like a man who was literally bowed down by care. His back was curved as though he carried a heavy burden. Yet he was not the weakling that I had at first imagined, for his shoulders and chest have the framework of a giant, though his figure tapers away into a pair of spindled legs."

"Left shoe wrinkled, right one smooth."

"I did not observe that."

"No, you wouldn't. I spotted his artificial limb. But proceed."

— The Adventure of the Retired Colourman

"The Haven is the name of Mr. Josiah Amberley's house," I explained. "I think it would interest you, Holmes. It is like some penurious patrician who has sunk into the company of his inferiors. You know that particular quarter, the monotonous brick streets, the weary suburban highways. Right in the middle of them, a little island of ancient culture and comfort, lies this old home, surrounded by a high sun-baked wall mottled with lichens and topped with moss, the sort of wall—" "Cut out the poetry, Watson," said Holmes, severely. "I note that it was a high brick wall."

— The Adventure of the Retired Colourman

Watson never masters Holmes's deductive methods, but he can be astute enough to follow his friend's reasoning after the fact. In "The Adventure of the Norwood Builder," Holmes notes that John Hector McFarlane is "a bachelor, a solicitor, a Freemason, and an asthmatic". Watson comments as narrator: "Familiar as I was with my friend's methods, it was not difficult for me to follow his deductions, and to observe the untidiness of attire, the sheaf of legal papers, the watch-charm, and the breathing which had prompted them." Similar episodes occur in "The Adventure of the Devil's Foot," "The Adventure of the Solitary Cyclist", and "The Adventure of the Resident Patient." In "The Adventure of the Red Circle", Watson, rather than Holmes correctly deduces a fact of value. (Note: Watson, rather than Holmes, guesses that the mysterious lodger printed their notes so as to conceal their handwriting, though initially neither one guesses precisely why they would want to.) In The Hound of the Baskervilles, Watson shows that he has picked up some of Holmes's skills at dealing with people from whom information is desired. (As he observes to the reader, "I have not lived for years with Sherlock Holmes for nothing." )

Despite Watson's frequent expressions of admiration and friendship for Holmes, the many stresses and strains of living and working with the detective make themselves evident in Watson's occasional grievance. The most controversial of such matters is Watson's candour about Holmes's drug use. Though the use of cocaine was legal and common in Holmes's era, as a physician well-versed in the frontiers of medical research, Watson criticises Holmes's habits after months of inner turmoil and timorous compliance.

Three times a day for many months I had witnessed this performance, but custom had not reconciled my mind to it. On the contrary, from day to day I had become more irritable at the sight, and my conscience swelled nightly within me at the thought that I had lacked the courage to protest. Again and again I had registered a vow that I should deliver my soul upon the subject; but there was that in the cool, nonchalant air of my companion which made him the last man with whom one would care to take anything approaching to a liberty. His great powers, his masterly manner, and the experience which I had had of his many extraordinary qualities, all made me diffident and backward in crossing him.

Yet upon that afternoon, whether it was the Beaune which I had taken with my lunch, or the additional exasperation produced by the extreme deliberation of his manner, I suddenly felt that I could hold out no longer.

'Which is it to-day,' I asked, 'morphine or cocaine?'

— The Sign of Four

Watson is also defined by a profound delicacy of character. The events related in "The Adventure of the Second Stain" are supposedly very sensitive: "If in telling the story I seem to be somewhat vague in certain details, the public will readily understand that there is an excellent reason for my reticence. It was, then, in a year, and even in a decade, that shall be nameless, that upon one Tuesday morning in autumn we found two visitors of European fame within the walls of our humble room in Baker Street." Furthermore, in "The Adventure of the Veiled Lodger," Watson notes that he has "made a slight change of name and place" when presenting that story. Here he is direct about a method of preserving discretion and confidentiality that other scholars have inferred from the stories, with pseudonyms replacing the "real" names of clients, witnesses, and culprits alike and altered place-names replacing the real locations.

== Influence ==
As the first-person narrator of Doyle's Holmes stories, Watson has inspired the creation of many similar narrator characters. After the appearance of Watson, the use of a "Watsonian narrator", a character like Watson who has a reason to be close to the detective but cannot follow or understand the detective's line of investigation, became "a standard feature of the classical detective story". This type of character has been called "the Watson".

The Holmes-Watson partnership, consisting of a "brilliant yet flawed detective" and a "humbler but sympathetic sidekick who is the narrator of the stories", influenced the creation of similar teams in British detective fiction throughout the twentieth century, from detective Hercule Poirot and Poirot's companion Captain Hastings (created by author Agatha Christie in 1920), to Colin Dexter's Inspector Morse and Sergeant Lewis, introduced in 1975. Watson also influenced the creation of other fictional narrators, such as Bunny Manders (the sidekick of gentleman thief A. J. Raffles, created by E. W. Hornung in 1898) and the American character Archie Goodwin (the assistant of detective Nero Wolfe, created by Rex Stout in 1934). Author Kodō Nomura modeled his characters Heiji Zenigata and his sidekick Hachigoro on Holmes and Watson.

Microsoft named the debugger in Microsoft Windows "Dr. Watson".

== Adaptations ==
=== Theatre ===
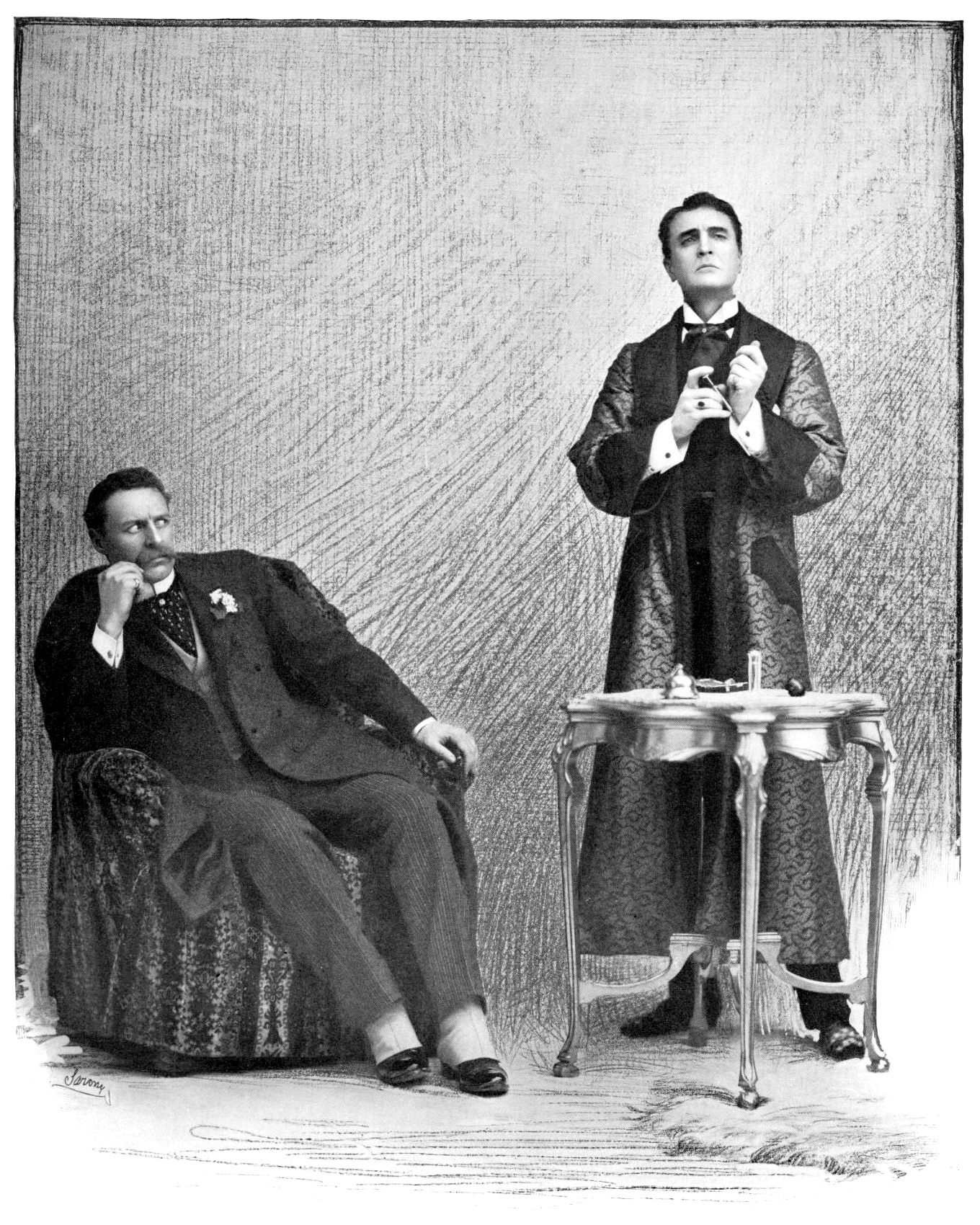
Holmes (William Gillette, right) with Dr Watson (Bruce McRae, left), in the 1899 Broadway production of Sherlock Holmes

Bruce McRae originated the role of Watson in the 1899 Broadway production of Sherlock Holmes, a play by William Gillette and Doyle.

Claude King played Watson in the 1910 premiere of The Speckled Band. In the 1923 play The Return of Sherlock Holmes, Watson was played by H. G. Stoker. In the 1965 musical Baker Street, he was played by Peter Sallis.

Derek Waring played Watson in the 1989 London premiere of Sherlock Holmes: The Musical. Lucas Hall portrayed Watson in the 2015 premiere of Baskerville: A Sherlock Holmes Mystery.

=== Film ===
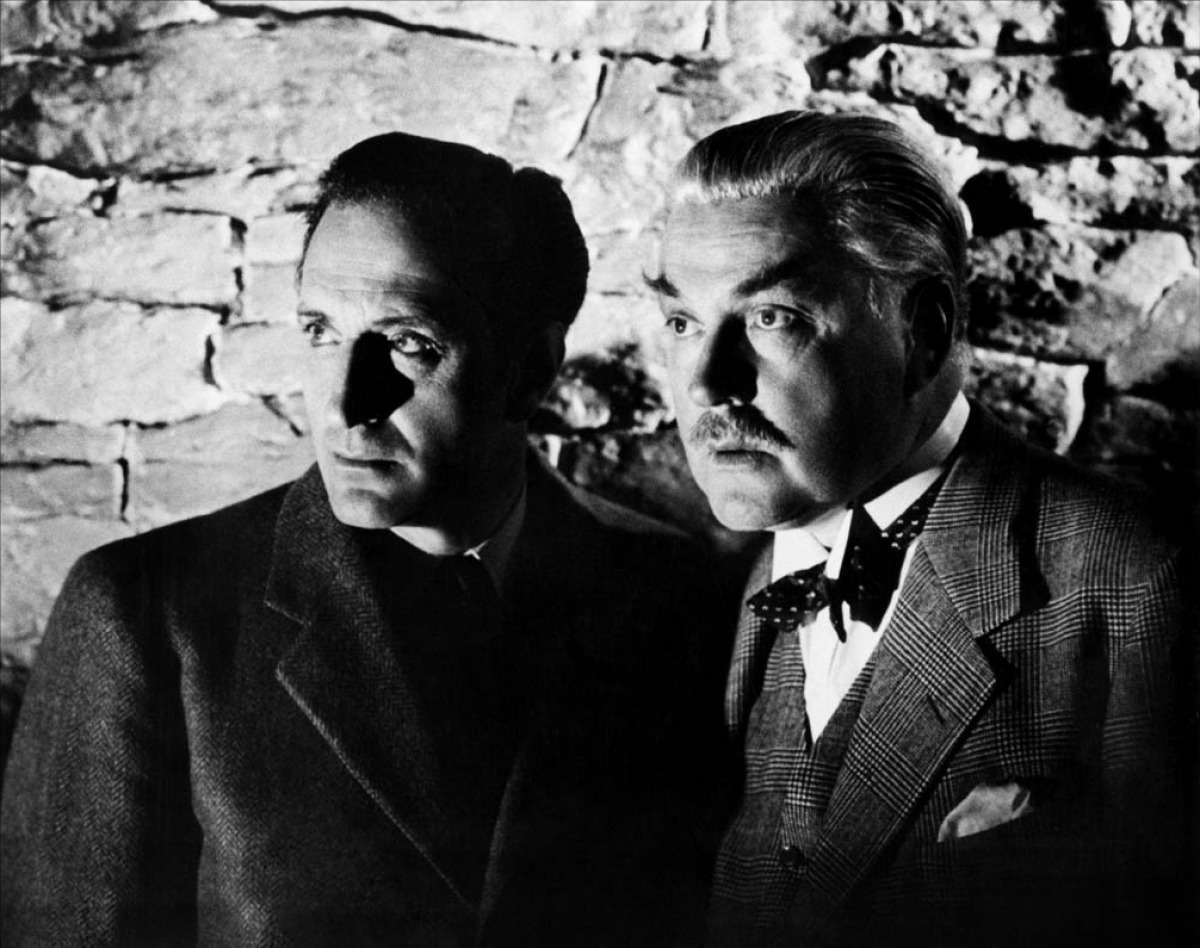
Nigel Bruce (right) as Dr Watson in Sherlock Holmes and the Secret Weapon (1942)

Actors to play Watson in early film adaptations of Sherlock Holmes include Edward Fielding (1916), Roland Young (1922), Ian Fleming (1931-1937, considered by critics to be a faithful interpretation of the Canon), Athole Stewart (The Speckled Band, 1931), Ian Hunter (The Sign of Four, 1932), Reginald Owen (1932) and Warburton Gamble (A Study in Scarlet, 1933). The series of Holmes films with Basil Rathbone as Holmes and Nigel Bruce as Watson portrayed the doctor as a lovable but incompetent old assistant. This shaped the adaptation trends for the decades to come.

Watson was played by actor André Morell in the 1959 film version of The Hound of the Baskervilles, wherein Morell didn't follow Nigel Bruce's interpretation. Other depictions include Robert Duvall opposite Nicol Williamson's Holmes in The Seven-Per-Cent Solution (1978); Donald Houston, who played Watson to John Neville's Holmes in A Study in Terror (1965); a rather belligerent, acerbic Watson portrayed by Colin Blakely in Billy Wilder's The Private Life of Sherlock Holmes (1970), in which Holmes was played by Robert Stephens (who starts the rumour that they are homosexual lovers to discourage female interest); and James Mason's portrayal in Murder by Decree (1978), with Christopher Plummer as Holmes. Alan Cox played a teenage Watson in the 1985 film Young Sherlock Holmes, narrated by Michael Hordern as an older Watson.

In the 1988 parody film Without a Clue, the roles of a witless Watson and an extremely intelligent Holmes are reversed. In the film, Holmes (Michael Caine) is an invention of Watson (Ben Kingsley) played by an alcoholic actor; when Watson initially offered suggestions on how to solve a case to some visiting policemen, he was at the time applying for a post in an exclusive but private medical practice and so invented the fictional Holmes to avoid attracting attention to himself. He continues the "lie" of Holmes's existence after he fails to get the post, hiring the actor as people wanted to meet the "real" Holmes. At the same time, Watson becomes increasingly frustrated that his own talents are unrecognised, and unavailingly attempts to win celebrity for himself as "the Crime Doctor" while the actor attempts to quit, only for both men to gain a new appreciation for each other during the latest confrontation with Professor Moriarty (one of the few men who knows the truth of their dynamic).

In the Guy Ritchie-directed Sherlock Holmes movies, Watson is portrayed by Jude Law. Law portrays Watson as knowledgeable, brave, strong-willed, and thoroughly professional, as well as a competent detective in his own right. Apart from being armed with his trademark sidearm, his film incarnation is also a capable swordsman. The film portrays Watson as having a gambling problem, which William S. Baring-Gould had inferred from a reference in "The Adventure of the Dancing Men" to Holmes keeping Watson's cheque book locked in a drawer in his desk. Law also portrayed Watson in the 2011 sequel, Sherlock Holmes: A Game of Shadows.

Watson appears on the 2010 direct-to-DVD Asylum film Sir Arthur Conan Doyle's Sherlock Holmes, a science fiction reinvention in which he was portrayed by actor Gareth David-Lloyd. At the beginning of the film, Watson is an elderly man portrayed by David Shackleton during the Blitz in 1940. He tells his nurse the tale of the adventure which he and Holmes vowed never to tell the public. In 1889, he is a home doctor and personal physician and biographer of Sherlock Holmes (Ben Syder). Here, Watson is portrayed as easily confused by Holmes's abilities, but the story is set in 1881, the same year as A Study in Scarlet, which may account for this. He is a skilled gunman and is loyal, if often irritated by Holmes's methods.

Watson, portrayed by Colin Starkey, appears briefly in the 2015 film Mr. Holmes (although he has no dialogue and his face is not shown). Reflecting on his career as a detective, Holmes (Ian McKellen) comments that Watson took considerable latitude in writing up the cases for publication, to the point that he views the finished products as little more than "penny dreadfuls". Holmes remarks that several key details of his literary counterpart, including his pipe, deerstalker hat, and 221B Baker Street address, were entirely fictitious.

The 2015 mashup anime film The Empire of Corpses features a younger, re-imagined Watson as the protagonist, in a steampunk world where the dead are reanimated and used as a labor force. He was voiced by Yoshimasa Hosoya in Japanese, and Jason Liebrecht in the English dub.

Watson is played by John C. Reilly opposite Will Ferrell as Holmes in the 2018 film Holmes & Watson.

In the 2022 film Enola Holmes 2, Himesh Patel makes an post-credits appearance as Dr. Watson. The film is inspired by The Enola Holmes Mysteries, a young adult fiction series of detective novels by American author Nancy Springer.

=== Television ===
William Podmore played Watson in The Three Garridebs (1937).

The first actor to play Watson on a TV series (as opposed to a one-off adaptation) was Raymond Francis who appeared in the 1951 British series, We Present Alan Wheatley as Mr. Sherlock Holmes in....

The 1950s Sherlock Holmes American TV series featured Howard Marion-Crawford as a stable Watson with a knockout punch.

Nigel Stock played Watson in two BBC series in 1965 and 1968.

In the Soviet Union television series The Adventures of Sherlock Holmes and Dr. Watson, directed by Igor Maslennikov, Watson was played by Vitaly Solomin. The Telegraph included Solomin in their list of the 10 top actors to play Dr Watson.

Watson was portrayed by David Burke and later by Edward Hardwicke in the 1980s and 1990s television series The Adventures of Sherlock Holmes, The Return of Sherlock Holmes, The Casebook of Sherlock Holmes and The Memoirs of Sherlock Holmes, all starring Jeremy Brett as Holmes.

In the animated TV series Sherlock Holmes in the 22nd Century (1999–2001), Holmes acquires a 'new' Watson in the form of a robot. The robot, having absorbed all lore of the stories, believes itself to be Watson, and Holmes treats it as such, concluding that the "spirit" is Watson's though the "body" is not.

Ian Hart portrayed a young, capable, and fit Watson twice for BBC Television, once opposite Richard Roxburgh as Holmes (in a 2002 adaptation of The Hound of the Baskervilles) and for a second time opposite Rupert Everett as the Great Detective in the new story Sherlock Holmes and the Case of the Silk Stocking (2004).

In the 2004–2012 medical drama House, the character of James Wilson, portrayed by Robert Sean Leonard, is partially based on John Watson. Beyond the similarity of their names, aspects of the relationship between Wilson and Gregory House mirror the relationship between Watson and Sherlock Holmes.

In the TV series Sanctuary, Dr. James Watson (Peter Wingfield) is a member of "The Five" and the actual detective in the Doyle stories. The character of Holmes is created and Watson is made his sidekick at Watson's request to Doyle.

In the 2010 BBC television show Sherlock, set in contemporary London, Martin Freeman portrays a Watson who breaks away from his canonical gentle and literary demeanor to emerge as a hardened, hardboiled veteran.

The 2012 CBS show Elementary, set in contemporary New York City, replaces the character with a Chinese American woman, Dr. Joan Watson (née Yun) (Lucy Liu), an ex-surgeon turned sober companion.

In the 2013 Russian adaptation Sherlock Holmes, Watson is portrayed as older than Holmes. The character was played by Andrei Panin, in his last role, as he died shortly after the filming was finished.

In the 2014 Japanese puppetry series Sherlock Holmes, Watson, a doctor's son and transfer student from Australia, becomes the roommate of Sherlock Holmes in 221B of Baker House. Though initially at a loss as to how to deal with Holmes, he becomes close to his strange roommate. He records Holmes' investigation in a notebook known as "Watoson memo" ("Memo of John H. Watson") and writes articles based on it for the school's wall newspaper. Wataru Takagi voices him and narrates the show.

In the 2018 Japanese drama series Miss Sherlock both lead characters are re-imagined as female. Dr. Wato Tachibana (Shihori Kanjiya) meets Sara "Sherlock" Futaba (Yuko Takeuchi) after becoming the witness of her mentor’s death. Soon she assists her in this event’s investigation and becomes her flatmate, friend and assistant. Sherlock calls her "Wato-san", which sounds similar to "Watson".

In the 2019 Japanese animated series Kabukicho Sherlock, Yuichi Nakamura voices a reimagined Watson who is an assistant to Holmes in Kabukicho.

Since 2025, Morris Chestnut starred in and executive produced the CBS series Watson. This version of the character is an African American geneticist who, following Holmes's supposed death at the Reichenbach Falls, becomes the head of a Pittsburgh clinic for rare diseases.

=== Radio ===
For most of the run of the 1930–1936 radio series The Adventures of Sherlock Holmes, Leigh Lovell played Watson with Richard Gordon as Holmes.

Nigel Bruce reprised his film role of Watson on the radio opposite first Basil Rathbone, then Tom Conway as Holmes for most of the 1940s radio series The New Adventures of Sherlock Holmes. Different actors played Watson in later seasons.

Carleton Hobbs portrayed Holmes in a series of BBC radio broadcasts that ran from 1952 to 1969, with Norman Shelley playing Watson. Many of these were broadcast on Children's Hour. Of the many actors who have portrayed Holmes and Watson for the BBC, the Hobbs and Shelley duo is the longest running.

In 1954, Sir Ralph Richardson played Watson (named James rather than John) in a short radio series on NBC opposite Sir John Gielgud as Holmes.

Watson was also portrayed by English-born actor Michael Williams for the BBC Radio adaptation of the complete run of the Holmes canon from November 1989 to July 1998. Williams, together with Clive Merrison, who played Holmes, were the first actors to portray the Doyle characters in all the short stories and novels of the canon. After Williams' death, the BBC continued the shows with The Further Adventures of Sherlock Holmes. Four series were produced, all written by Bert Coules who had been the head writer on the complete canon project, with Andrew Sachs starring opposite Merrison.

In 1998, Imagination Theatre received the rights from the estate of Dame Jean Conan Doyle to produce new radio stories of Holmes and Watson. Lawrence Albert plays Watson to the Holmes of first John Gilbert and later John Patrick Lowrie in the radio series The Further Adventures of Sherlock Holmes. Lowrie and Albert also played Holmes and Watson respectively in The Classic Adventures of Sherlock Holmes, which adapted all of Doyle's short stories and novels.

=== Video games ===
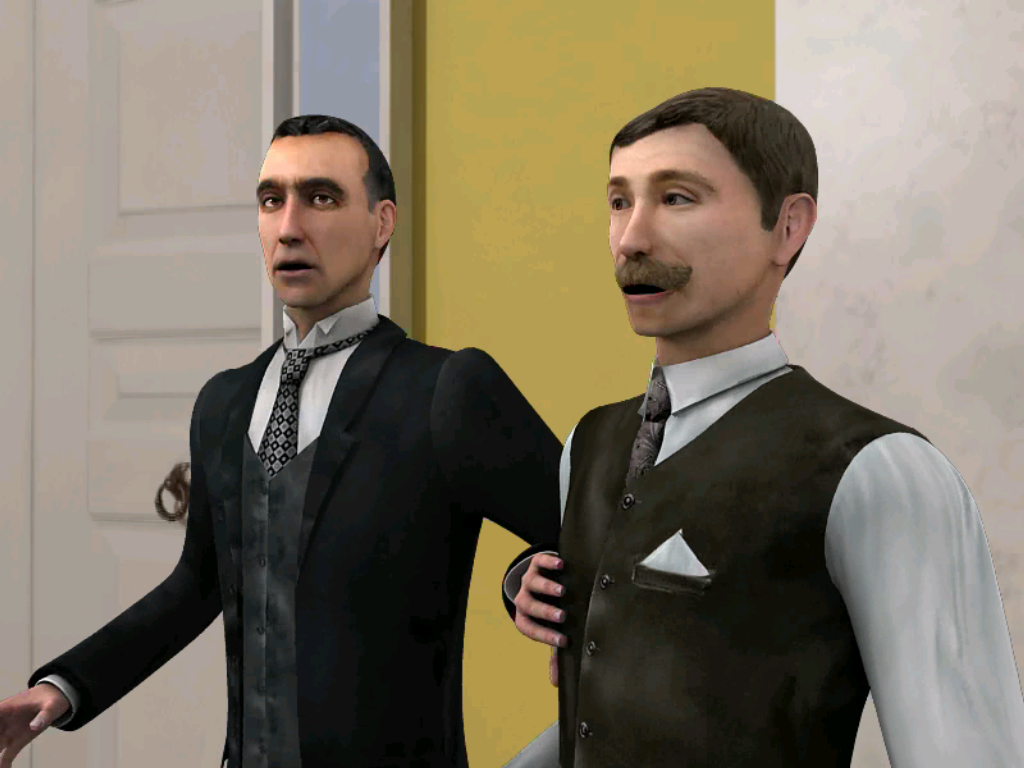
Holmes and Watson (right), as they appear in the 2004 video game Sherlock Holmes: The Case of the Silver Earring

Watson appears alongside Holmes in multiple Sherlock Holmes video games, such as Sherlock Holmes: Consulting Detective (1991) and its two sequels, and The Lost Files of Sherlock Holmes (1992) and its sequel. Watson also appears with Holmes in the Sherlock Holmes series of video games developed by Frogwares.

Watson appears at the start of The Great Ace Attorney: Adventures (2015), where he is murdered while teaching in Japan. His role as an assistant to Sherlock Holmes is instead filled by another character named Iris Watson, who claims to be his daughter and uses "Dr. John H. Watson" as a pen name. Both Watsons had their names changed to Wilson due to copyright concerns in international releases.

G5 Entertainment published a free-to-play hidden object game called Sherlock (2020), featuring Watson and Holmes.

=== Print ===
Stephen King, the American novelist, wrote a short story called "The Doctor's Case" in the 1993 collection Nightmares & Dreamscapes, where Watson actually solves the case instead of Holmes. Watson appears as a supporting character in several of American author Laurie R. King's Mary Russell detective novels.

American author Michael Mallory began a series of stories in the mid-1990s featuring Watson's mysterious second wife, whom he called Amelia Watson. In Sherlock Holmes's War of the Worlds, Watson's second wife is Violet Hunter, from "The Adventure of the Copper Beeches".

Robert Ryan wrote a series of thriller novels featuring Watson as an army Major in World War I.

== See also ==
- List of actors who have played Dr. Watson
- Sherlock Holmes pastiches

== Bibliography ==
- Butalia, Romesh C. (1998). The Evolution of the Artillery in India: From the Battle of Plassey (1757) to the Revolt of 1857. Allied Publishers. ISBN 8170238722.
