= Ùisdean =

- Gender: Masculine
- Language: Scottish Gaelic

Origin
- Language: Old Norse
- Origin: Eysteinn
- Derivation: ey, ei + steinn
- Meaning: "always, forever" + "stone"

Other names
- Variant forms: Hùisdean; Uisdean
- Anglicisation: Hugh

Ùisdean is a Scottish Gaelic masculine given name. Variant forms include Uisdean and Hùisdean. The names are derived from the Old Norse personal name Eysteinn, *Aystein (later Øysteinn). Eysteinn is composed of the elements ey, ei, meaning "always, forever"; and steinn, meaning "stone". An anglicised form of Ùisdean and Uisdean is Hugh. (Note: Hugh is also an Anglicised form of the Scottish Gaelic Aodh.)

== People with the name ==
- Hugh of Sleat (1437–1498), Scottish clan chief
- Hugh MacDonald (Scottish politician) (1929–2013), Scottish politician
- Hugh Dan MacLennan (Scottish Gaelic: Ùisdean MacIllFhinnein), Scottish broadcaster, author and academic
