= Hamish MacDonald =

Hamish MacDonald may refer to:

- Hamish Macdonald (broadcast journalist), Australian news presenter and journalist
- Hamish MacDonald (athlete) (born 1974), Australian Paralympian
- Hamish Macdonald (rugby union) (born 1947), New Zealand rugby union player
- Hamish Macdonald (artist) (1935–2008), Scottish painter
- Hamish MacDonald (writer) (born 1958), Scottish writer, poet, playwright and performer

== See also ==
- Hamish McDonald, Australian author and journalist
