= Seamus McGuire =

Irish fiddle player

- Born: County Sligo, Ireland
- Genres: Classical; folk
- Occupations: Musician, doctor
- Instrument: Fiddle
- Member of: Buttons and Bows, The West Ocean String Quartet

Seamus McGuire is an Irish fiddle player born in County Sligo now residing in County Donegal. In 1966, he won Sligo's prestigious "Fiddler of Dooney" competition. He is a founding member of Buttons and Bows (with Manus McGuire, Jackie Daly and Garry O'Briain), as well as The West Ocean String Quartet (with Niamh Crowley, Kenneth Rice, and Neil Martin). The quartet reflects his classical training and his love of exploring spaces where classical and traditional musics can meet. Like his younger brother Manus McGuire, another renowned fiddle player, he is a medical doctor.

== Discography ==
- The Humours of Lissadell - with Manus McGuire, Folk Legacy (1980)
- Carousel - with Manus McGuire & Daithi Sproule, Gael Linn (1984)
- Buttons & Bows - by Buttons & Bows, Green Linnet, 1984)
- First month of Summer - by Buttons & Bows, Green Linnet (1987)
- The Missing Reel - with John Lee, Gael Linn (1990)
- Grace Notes - by Buttons & Bows, Gael Linn (1991)
- The Wishing Tree - Green Linnet (1995)
- Unwrapping Dreams - by the West Ocean String Quartet, Wren Records (2004)
- The Guiding Moon - by the West Ocean String Quartet with Matt Malloy, West Ocean Records (2006)
- Ae Fond Kiss - by the West Ocean String Quartet with Maighread Ní Dhomhnaill, West Ocean Records (2010)
- An Indigo Sky - by the West Ocean String Quartet (2013)
- The Return of Spring - by Buttons & Bows (2015)
- The Legacy of Stephen Grier - with flautist John Lee (2018)
- Atlantic Edge - by The West Ocean String Quartet (2020)
- An Irish Viola / Vióla Gaelach - with Steve Cooney (2021)
