= Sorley (given name) =

Sorley and Somerled are masculine given names in the English language, Anglicizations of Scottish Gaelic Somhairle and Norse Sumarlidi.

== Etymology ==
Sorley is an Anglicised form of Somhairle (modern Scottish Gaelic pronunciation: [ˈs̪o.ərˠlə]), a name mutual to the Irish, Manx, and Scottish Gaelic languages, which means "summer warrior". The Gaelic name is a form of the English Somerled, and both names are ultimately derived from the Old Norse Old Norse Sumarliðr. A variant form of Sumarliðr is Sumarliði. A variant form of Somerled is Summerlad, a name altered by folk etymology, derived from the words "summer" and "lad". Somhairle is sometimes Anglicised as Samuel, although these two names are etymologically unrelated (the latter being ultimately of Hebrew origin).

The Old Norse personal name likely originated as a byname, meaning "summer-traveller", "summer-warrior", in reference to a Viking, or men who took to raiding during the summer months as opposed to full-time raiders. An early occurrence of the term is sumarliða (sumorlida, perhaps meaning "fleet"), recorded in the Anglo-Saxon Chronicle under the year 871. Another early occurrence of the term is Classi Somarlidiorum, meaning "fleet of the sumarliðar", which is recorded in the 12th-century Chronicle of the Kings of Alba, in an account of an attack on Buchan in the mid-10th century. Possibly the earliest record of the personal name occurs in a grant of land in Nottinghamshire by Edgar the Peaceful in 958. Several men with the name are recorded in early Icelandic sources, such as the 10th-century Hrappr Sumarliðason, and his son Sumarliði, Icelanders said to have been of Scottish and Hebridean ancestry. The first historical personage in Orkney with the name was Sumarliði Sigurðsson, Earl of Orkney, eldest son of Sigurðr digri, Earl of Orkney (d. 1014).

== List of persons with the given name ==
=== Somerled ===
- Somerled (died 1164), Lord of Argyll, King of the Hebrides, Isle of Man and Kintyre

=== Somhairle ===
- Somhairle Mac Domhnail, 17th-century Irish soldier

=== Sorley ===
- Sorley Boy MacDonnell, (died 1590), Scottish/Irish chieftain
- Sorley MacLean, (Somhairle MacGill-Eain, 1911–1996), one of the most significant Scottish poets of the 20th century

=== Sumarlidi ===
- Sumarlidi Sigurdsson, 11th-century Earl of Orkney

== See also ==
- Sorley (surname)
