= List of storms named Hamish =

The name Hamish has been used for two tropical cyclones in the Australian region of the Southern Hemisphere.

- Cyclone Hamish (1999) – did not make landfall.
- Cyclone Hamish (2009) – a severe tropical cyclone that caused extensive damage to the Great Barrier Reef and coastal Queensland, Australia, in 2009 that also caused two fatalities.
