= Sørlie =

Sørlie or Sorlie may refer to:

- Arthur G. Sorlie (1874–1928), the fourteenth Governor of North Dakota, USA
- Else-Marthe Sørlie Lybekk (born 1978), Norwegian team handball player, world champion and Olympic gold medallist
- Reidar Sørlie (1909–1969), Norwegian discus thrower
- Robert Sørlie (born 1958), two time Iditarod champion Norwegian dog musher and dog sled racer from Hurdal

== See also ==
- Sorlie Memorial Bridge, connects the cities of Grand Forks, North Dakota and East Grand Forks, Minnesota
