= Stephen Shalet =

British endocrinologist

Stephen Michael Shalet FRCP (born 26 April 1944) is an English endocrinologist, and a former professor at the University of Manchester.

== Early life ==
He was born in Bedford, where his mother had been evacuated from London. His father was a GP in the East End of London, and serving as an army doctor. At the age of nine he moved to Stoke Newington. He attended Westminster City Grammar School. He studied medicine at the London Hospital, since 1990 the Royal London Hospital, qualifying in 1969.

== Career ==
He moved to Manchester in 1974 as a research fellow, becoming a consultant four years later. He retired in 2005. He was on the Strategic Planning Committee of the European Society of Pediatric Endocrinology. He is a co-editor of the Oxford Textbook of Endocrinology and Diabetes.

== Personal life ==
He now lives in Sheffield with his wife, Diana Greenfield. His first wife Caroline (née Goldin) died in 2002. After a brief second marriage, he subsequently married Diana in 2019. He has a daughter, Shashana (aka Rachael). His son, Daniel, who had a form of myotonic dystrophia, died in 2023.

== See also ==
- Society for Endocrinology
