= Seamus Metress =

American academic (born 1933)

Seamus Metress (born 1933) is professor emeritus of anthropology at the University of Toledo, Ohio. He has been teaching at the university level for over 30 years. He received his Ph.D. from Indiana University in 1971. Also, he attended The University of Notre Dame, when it was an all-male college.

- Areas of Interest: Race and Ethnicity, Medical Anthropology, Conflict in Northern Ireland
- Research: Biocultural Anthropology, Irish Studies and Ethnic Conflict
- Field Research projects in Northeast Ireland and the Great Lakes Region.

== Bibliography ==
Metress has published over 30 books and numerous articles. A partial list includes:

- Man in Ecological Perspective (Editor, 1972)
- Man in Evolutionary Perspective (Editor, with C. Loring Brace, 1973)
- Aging and Health: Biologic and Social Perspectives (with Cary S. Kart and Eileen K. Metress, 1978)
- Listen, Irish People! (published by Todd & Honeywell, Inc., 1979) ISBN 0-89962-007-8
- The Irish-American Experience: A Guide to the Literature (1981)
- Euro-American Elderly: An Ethnic Bibliography (with Eileen K Metress, 1983)
- The hunger strike and the final struggle (1983)
- Nutrition, the Aged, and Society (with Cary S. Kart, 1984)
- A Regional Guide to Informational Sources on the Irish in the United States and Canada (Public Administration Series : Bibliography, P 1841) (1986)
- Aging, Health, and Society (with Cary Steven Kart and Eileen Metress, 1988)
- Human Aging and Chronic Disease (with Cary S. Kart and Eileen K. Metress, 1992)
- The American Irish and Irish Nationalism: A Sociohistorical Introduction (1995)
- The great starvation: An Irish holocaust (1996)
- Irish In North America A Regional Biography (with Donna Hardy-Johnston, 1999)
- Irish in Toledo: History and Memory (Editor, with Molly Schiever, 2005)
- Irish in Michigan (Discovering the Peoples of Michigan Series) (with Eileen K. Metress, 2006)
