= Seamus Ryan (photographer) =

Irish photographer

- Born: 1964 (age 60–61)
- Occupation: Photographer

Seamus Ryan (born 1964) is an Irish photographer.

He learned the basics of photography in Dublin, and came to London around 1990. He has done work for among others Nike, BBC, and British Airways.

Ryan performs "Sunday shoots", where he opens his studio to passers-by who wants him to take their picture. On one such occasion he photographed playwright Tom Stoppard, and the picture was purchased by London's National Portrait Gallery.

In 2007 he founded Boothnation, a company that supplies custom-built photobooths for rental.
