= Séamus Ó Súilleabháin =

- Occupations: Scribe, writer and translator
- Writing career
- Period: 1849
- Genres: Songs, poems, Fenian lore, and stories

Séamus Ó Súilleabháin (fl. 1849) was an Irish scribe, writer and translator.

Ó Súilleabháin transcribed and wrote down a great deal of material from several different genres; songs, poems, Fenian lore, stories such as Cath Bruíon Caorthainn and Cath Gabhra. One such manuscript that survives states at the end that

I have thus finished this book, for the Revd. Joseph Baylee, rector of Holy Trinity Church (Woodside, Cheshire) and headmaster of the Birkenhead College ... December 15th 1849 dated at the town of Headford in the County Galway Ireland. James O'Sullivan Scribe and Translateor.

Rev. Baylee was his patron, and lived in Oldtown, Chuallacht na gCairde, County Limerick. He was stridently Protestant, and said that the Catholic faith was "spiritual tyranny which they, the said unhallowed and unsantified Philistines, have exercised in England, Ireland and Scotland."

He seems to have lived for a time in Limerick, and may have been a schoolmaster.
