= Sorley (surname) =

Sorley is an English surname. Notable people with the surname include:

- Alexander Clark Sorley (born 1956), Scottish music producer
- Charles Sorley (1895–1915), British poet of World War I
- Edward Sorley (1871–1933), British actor
- Lewis Sorley (1934–2024), American intelligence analyst and military historian
- Ralph Sorley (1898–1974), British World War I and World War II Air Force officer
- Tom Sorley, University of Nebraska quarterback
- William Ritchie Sorley (1855–1935), British philosopher
