= Ailean =

Masculine given name in the Scottish Gaelic language

- Gender: Masculine
- Language: Scottish Gaelic

Origin
- Language: Celtic
- Meaning: "rock"

Other names
- Cognates: Alan, Allan

Ailean is a masculine given name in the Scottish Gaelic language. It is the Scottish Gaelic equivalent of the name Alan, Allan in English. Alan is considered to be a name of Celtic origin, possibility derived from a word meaning "rock"; it was introduced to England by Breton followers of William the Conqueror, in the 11th century.

== List of people with the given name ==
- Ailean Maclean, (fl. 16th century), a Scotsman popularised in 19th century folklore
- Ailéan mac Ruaidhrí, (died ×1296), Norwegian and Scottish magnate
