= Seumas =

- Pronunciation: Scottish Gaelic: [ˈʃeːməs̪]
- Gender: Masculine
- Language: Scottish Gaelic, Scots

Origin
- Meaning: Jacob

Other names
- Variant form: Seumus
- Cognates: Jacob, James, Séamas, Séamus
- Derivative: Hamish

Seumas (Scottish Gaelic pronunciation: [ˈʃeːməs]) is a masculine given name in Scottish Gaelic and Scots, equivalent to the English James. The vocative case of the Scottish Gaelic Seumas is Sheumais, which has given form to the Anglicised form of this name, Hamish. In Irish, Seumas is the older form of the modern Séamas. Another earlier form of Séamas is Séamus, which is partially Anglicised as Seamus.

== List of people with the given name ==
- Seumas McNally (1979–2000), a computer game programmer.
- Seumas Milne (born 1958), a British journalist and political aide.
- Seumas O'Kelly (c. 1875–1918), an Irish author and playwright.
- Seumas O'Sullivan (1879–1958), an Irish poet and editor of The Dublin Magazine.
