= The Adventure of the Copper Beeches =

Short story by Arthur Conan Doyle featuring Sherlock Holmes

- Short story by Arthur Conan Doyle
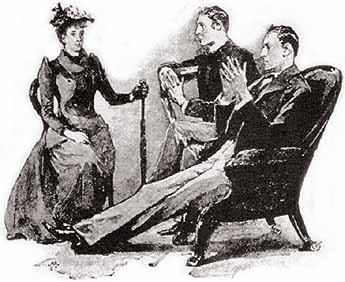
- Violet Hunter consulting Holmes, 1892 illustration by Sidney Paget

Text available at Wikisource
- Country: United Kingdom
- Language: English
- Genre: Detective fiction short stories

Publication
- Published in: Strand Magazine
- Publication date: June 1892

Chronology
- Series: The Adventures of Sherlock Holmes
The Adventure of the Beryl Coronet	The Memoirs of Sherlock Holmes

"The Adventure of the Copper Beeches", one of the 56 short Sherlock Holmes stories written by Sir Arthur Conan Doyle, is the last of the twelve collected in The Adventures of Sherlock Holmes. It was first published in The Strand Magazine in June 1892.

== Plot ==
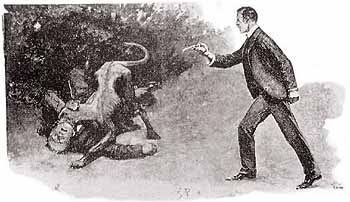
Watson rescuing Rucastle from his Mastiff

Violet Hunter visits Sherlock Holmes for advice on whether she should accept a unique governess job with a substantial initial salary of £100 a year, on the condition that she cut her hair short, among other strange provisos. When she initially refuses, the man who made the offer, Jephro Rucastle, increases the offer to £120 (equivalent to £13,182 in 2025). Despite her suspicions, Miss Hunter ultimately agrees, and leaves for Hampshire to work at Rucastle's countryside estate, the Copper Beeches. Holmes advises her to contact him via telegram, should she need him.

After a fortnight, Holmes receives a message from Miss Hunter, beseeching him to see her in Winchester. After they reunite, she explains that Rucastle would sometimes make her wear an electric blue dress and sit in the front room, with her back to the front window. Suspecting she was not supposed to see something outside, she used a small mirror shard hidden in her handkerchief to confirm and witnessed a man standing by the nearby road looking at the house. Additionally, Rucastle's wife never seemed to smile, Miss Hunter's six-year-old charge was astonishingly cruel to small animals, and Miss Hunter found a cut-off tress of hair similar to her own in a locked drawer. Furthermore, Carlo, a deliberately-starved and vicious Mastiff that only the drunken manservant Mr Toller could control, was let loose every night to prowl the grounds. As such, Miss Hunter was ordered not to cross the threshold after dark.

Miss Hunter had also been uneasy about a forbidden wing of the house where the windows were either dirty or shuttered. At one point, Rucastle emerged from it, looking perturbed, and claimed he was using it as a darkroom. Unconvinced, Miss Hunter entered the wing when Toller left his keys in the door, only to be frightened into fleeing by a moving shadow on the other side of a locked door. She collided with Rucastle, who attempted to comfort her and ascertain what she might have found out. His overacting aroused Miss Hunter's suspicions, confirmed when he suddenly threatened to feed her to Carlo if she entered the wing again.

Accepting the case, Holmes deduces someone is being held prisoner in the mystery wing. He further deduces Rucastle hired Miss Hunter to impersonate his daughter Alice, whom Hunter was unaware of and strongly resembled, to convince the stranger outside that Alice is not interested in seeing him. Joined by Hunter and Dr Watson, Holmes breaks into the mystery wing, but it is empty. Rucastle enters; deducing Alice has escaped and believing the trio helped her, he tries to sic Carlo on them. However, the dog had been starved for longer than usual and attacks its master, until Watson kills it with his revolver.

Later, Toller's wife confirms Holmes' theory, and reveals when Alice came of age, she was to receive an annuity from her late mother's will. Rucastle tried to force her to sign control of the inheritance over to him, resulting in Alice falling ill with brain fever and having her hair cut off. He subsequently tried to keep her away from her fiancé Mr. Fowler and hired Hunter to maintain appearances. It was Mrs Toller who helped Alice escape and flee with her fiancé.

Afterward, Alice marries her fiancé; Rucastle survives as an invalid being cared for by his second wife; and Miss Hunter becomes the principal of an all-girls' school in Walsall, which meets with "considerable success".

== Publication history ==
"The Adventure of the Copper Beeches" was first published in the UK in The Strand Magazine in June 1892, and in the United States in the US edition of the Strand in July 1892. The story was published with nine illustrations by Sidney Paget in The Strand Magazine. It was included in the short story collection The Adventures of Sherlock Holmes, which was published in October 1892.

== Adaptations ==
=== Film and television ===
The Copper Beeches (1912).

The story was adapted as the short film The Copper Beeches (1912), starring Georges Tréville and directed, though uncredited, by Adrien Caillard, as part of the Éclair film series. The Copper Beeches (1912) was one of a series of eight silent film adaptations of the Holmes stories that were actually supervised by Conan Doyle. It is the only one that has survived. It is altered in several respects. Instead of beginning with Ms Hunter's visit to Baker Street to tell her story, it starts with Rucastle trying to force his daughter to sign away her rights to her fortune, and then ordering her fiancé off his property. Rucastle subsequently locks up his daughter. The film only has Holmes (no Watson), and there is no appearance of Mrs Rucastle nor the servants. Nor is there any mastiff hound. The scheme of why Rucastle wants Ms Hunter to trim her hair and stand by the window is the same, but the motive is different: Rucastle seeking to lure the fiancé back so he can pretend he shot him as a trespasser. In the end, Holmes and the police capture Rucastle, and the daughter and her fiancé are united.

Another short film adaptation, The Copper Beeches (1921), was released as part of the Stoll film series starring Eille Norwood.

The story was adapted as "The Copper Beeches", a 1965 episode of Sherlock Holmes starring Douglas Wilmer as Holmes, Nigel Stock as Watson, Suzanne Neve as Violet Hunter and Patrick Wymark as Jephro Rucastle.

"The Copper Beeches" is a 1985 episode of The Adventures of Sherlock Holmes starring Jeremy Brett as Sherlock Holmes, with Natasha Richardson as Miss Hunter and Joss Ackland as Rucastle.

=== Audio ===
"The Copper Beeches" was adapted by Edith Meiser as an episode of the radio series The Adventures of Sherlock Holmes. The episode aired on 17 November 1930, with Richard Gordon as Sherlock Holmes and Leigh Lovell as Dr. Watson. Another radio dramatisation of the story aired on 5 May 1935 (with Louis Hector as Holmes and Lovell as Watson). Meiser also adapted the story as an episode of The New Adventures of Sherlock Holmes with Basil Rathbone as Holmes and Nigel Bruce as Watson. The episode aired on 6 October 1940. Other dramatisations of the story aired on 7 May 1943 (again with Rathbone and Bruce) and in November 1947 (with John Stanley as Holmes and Alfred Shirley as Watson).

The story was adapted by Felix Felton as a radio production that aired on the BBC Light Programme in 1955, as part of the 1952–1969 radio series starring Carleton Hobbs as Holmes and Norman Shelley as Watson.

An adaptation aired on BBC radio in 1978, starring Barry Foster as Holmes and David Buck as Watson. It was adapted by Michael Bakewell.

"The Copper Beeches" was dramatised by Peter Mackie for BBC Radio 4 in 1991 as an episode of the 1989–1998 radio series starring Clive Merrison as Holmes and Michael Williams as Watson. It featured Roger Hammond as Jephro Rucastle and Imogen Stubbs as Violet Hunter.

The story was adapted as a 2015 episode of the radio series The Classic Adventures of Sherlock Holmes, with John Patrick Lowrie as Holmes and Lawrence Albert as Watson.

In August 2026, the podcast Sherlock & Co. adapted the story in a three-episode adventure called "The Copper Beeches", starring Harry Attwell as Sherlock Holmes, Paul Waggott as Dr. John Watson and Marta da Silva as Mariana "Mrs. Hudson" Ametxazurra. Violet Hunter is played by Ezra Saifie, Juniper Rocastle by Lauren Ingram, and Matthew Fowler by Pete Gold. As a modern retelling, "Copper Beeches" is re-worked as a brand of wine.

=== Print ===
Peter Cannon has pointed to parallels between "The Adventure of the Copper Beeches" and H. P. Lovecraft's story "The Picture in the House".

In Sherlock Holmes's War of the Worlds, Violet Hunter becomes the second wife of Dr. Watson mentioned in "The Adventure of the Blanched Soldier". Hunter was said to have been married to the first mate on HMS Thunder Child.
