= A Scandal in Bohemia =

1891 short story by Arthur Conan Doyle

- Short story by Arthur Conan Doyle
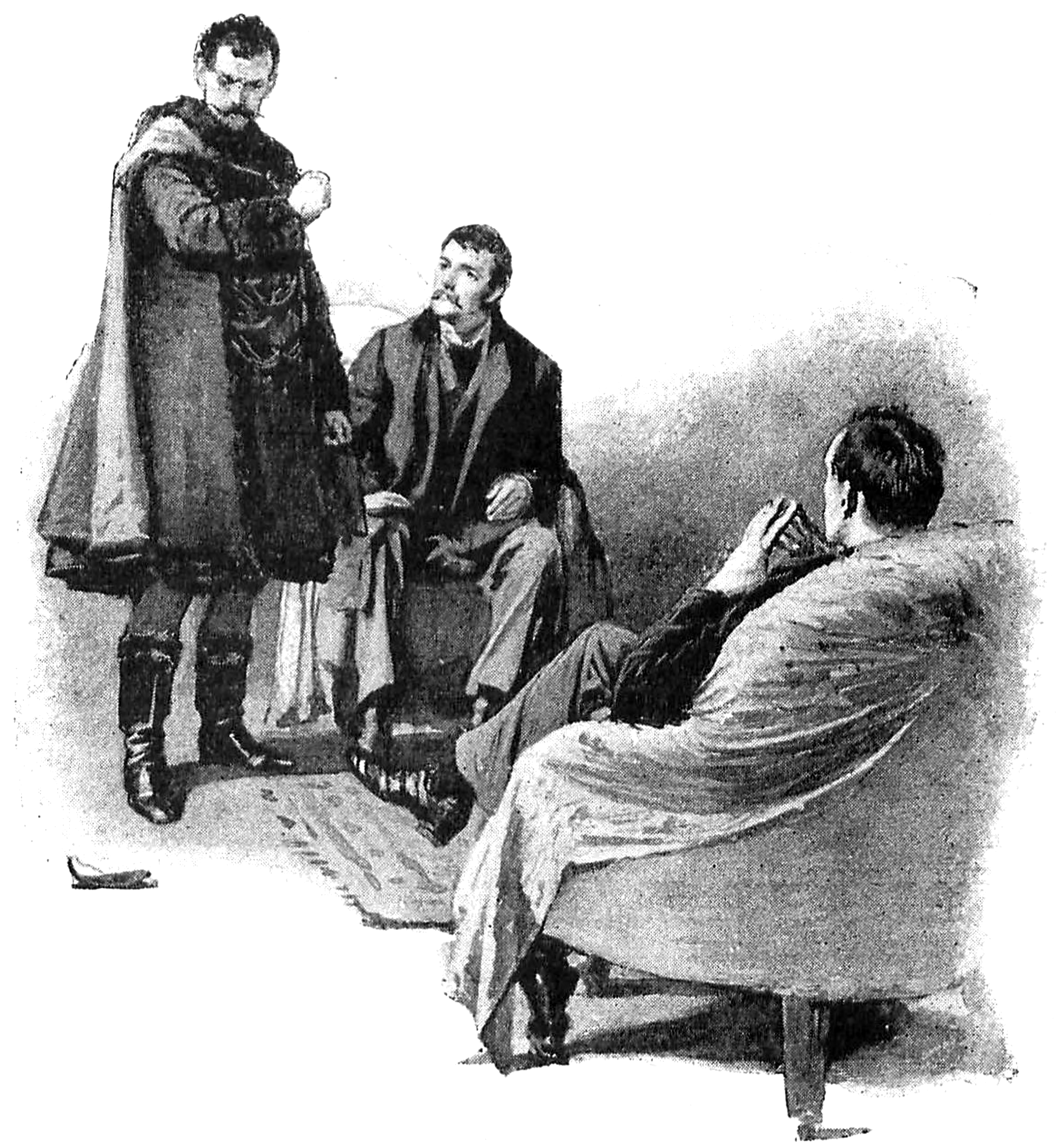
- Count von Kramm explains his predicament to Holmes and Watson, 1891 illustration by Sidney Paget

Text available at Wikisource
- Country: United Kingdom
- Language: English
- Genre: Detective fiction short stories

Publication
- Published in: Strand Magazine
- Publication date: June 1891

Chronology
- Series: The Adventures of Sherlock Holmes
—	The Red-Headed League

"A Scandal in Bohemia" is the first short story, and the third overall work, featuring Arthur Conan Doyle's fictional detective Sherlock Holmes. It is the first of the 56 Holmes short stories written by Doyle and the first of 38 Sherlock Holmes works illustrated by Sidney Paget. The story is notable for introducing the character of Irene Adler, who is one of the most notable female characters in the Sherlock Holmes series, despite appearing in only one story.

"A Scandal in Bohemia" was first published on 25 June 1891 in the July issue of The Strand Magazine, and was the first of the stories collected in The Adventures of Sherlock Holmes in 1892.

== Plot ==
The Grand Duke of Cassel-Felstein and hereditary King of Bohemia visits 221B Baker Street. Five years earlier, he had engaged in a secret relationship with American opera singer Irene Adler. He is set to marry a young Scandinavian princess, but worries that her family will call the marriage off should they learn of this impropriety. The king seeks to regain a photograph of Adler and himself together which he gave to her as a token and which she now threatens to send to his fiancée's family.

The next day, a disguised Holmes visits Adler's neighbourhood, examines her home from outside, and learns of her lifestyle and daily routine from the local ostlers. Lawyer Godfrey Norton visits Adler for half an hour, after which they leave separately and hurriedly for a particular church. Holmes follows them there and is unexpectedly asked to be a witness to their wedding. Upon returning to Baker Street, he enlists Watson to assist in a ploy that will reveal the location of the photograph.

Holmes arranges for several men to start a fight outside Adler's home as she returns from her usual afternoon carriage ride, and fakes being injured in the scuffle. Once he has been carried inside to recover, Watson throws in a smoke bomb and shouts that a fire has started. In the confusion, Holmes watches Adler's reactions and determines where she has hidden the photograph. He notifes the king of these findings and arranges for the three to visit Adler the following morning so they can collect it.

When they arrive, they find that Adler and Norton have left England and taken the photograph with them, leaving behind a note and a second picture of Adler alone. She explains that she had been warned that the king would almost certainly send Holmes to act on his behalf, and after the incident with the smoke bomb she realised what he'd done and followed Holmes to Baker Street to confirm his identity. She assures the king that she and Norton are in love, and that the king need not fear any reprisals from her as long as he takes no action against the couple.

Even though Holmes has failed to retrieve the photograph, the king believes the photograph to be safe because Adler is a woman of her word. He offers an emerald ring as payment, but Holmes declines in favor of the picture of Adler. Watson concludes the story by noting that the case prompted Holmes to stop mocking the cleverness of women, and that he always referred to Adler as "the woman" from that point on as a way of honoring and respecting her victory over him.

In "A Case of Identity", Holmes shows Watson an amethyst-inlaid gold snuffbox the king sent for his service.

== Holmes' relationship to Adler ==
Adler earns Holmes' unbounded admiration. When the King of Bohemia says: "Would she not have made an admirable queen? Is it not a pity she was not on my level?" Holmes replies that Adler is indeed on a much different level from the King, implying that she was superior to the King all along.

The beginning of "A Scandal in Bohemia" describes the high regard in which Holmes held Adler:

To Sherlock Holmes she is always the woman. I have seldom heard him mention her under any other name. In his eyes she eclipses and predominates the whole of her sex. It was not that he felt any emotion akin to love for Irene Adler. All emotions, and that one particularly, were abhorrent to his cold, precise but admirably balanced mind. He was, I take it, the most perfect reasoning and observing machine that the world has seen, but as a lover he would have placed himself in a false position. He never spoke of the softer passions, save with a gibe and a sneer. They were admirable things for the observer—excellent for drawing the veil from men's motives and actions. But for the trained reasoner to admit such intrusions into his own delicate and finely adjusted temperament was to introduce a distracting factor which might throw a doubt upon all his mental results. Grit in a sensitive instrument, or a crack in one of his own high-power lenses, would not be more disturbing than a strong emotion in a nature such as his. And yet there was but one woman to him, and that woman was the late Irene Adler, of dubious and questionable memory.

This "memory" is kept alive by a photograph of Irene Adler, which had been deliberately left behind when she and her new husband took flight with the humiliating photograph of her with the King. Holmes had then asked for and received this photo from the King, as payment for his work on the case. In "The Five Orange Pips" he comments to a client that he has been defeated on a mere handful of occasions and only once by a woman.

In derivative works, she is frequently used as a romantic interest for Holmes, a departure from Doyle's novels where he only admired her for her wit and cunning. In his Sherlock Holmes Handbook, Christopher Redmond notes that "the Canon provides little basis for either sentimental or prurient speculation about a Holmes-Adler connection".

== Publication history ==
"A Scandal in Bohemia" was first published in the UK in The Strand Magazine in July 1891, and in the United States in the US edition of the Strand in August 1891. The story was published with ten illustrations by Sidney Paget in The Strand Magazine. It was included in the short story collection The Adventures of Sherlock Holmes, which was published in October 1892.

== Adaptations ==
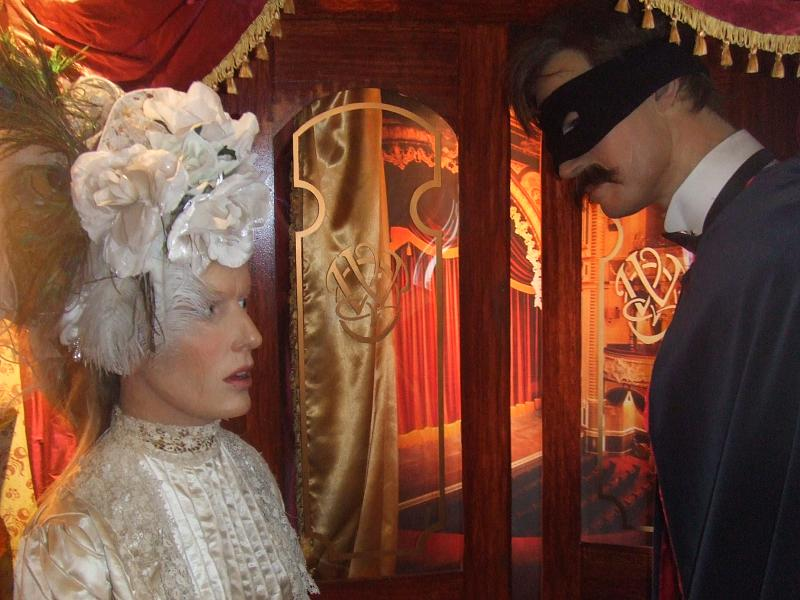
Scandal in Bohemia, Sherlock Holmes Museum.

=== Stage ===
William Gillette's 1899 stage play Sherlock Holmes is based on several stories, among them "A Scandal in Bohemia". Films released in 1916 (starring Gillette as Holmes) and 1922 (starring John Barrymore), both titled Sherlock Holmes, were based on the play, as was a 1938 Mercury Theatre on the Air radio adaptation titled The Immortal Sherlock Holmes, starring Orson Welles as Holmes.

The 1965 Broadway musical Baker Street was loosely based on the story, making Irene Adler into the heroine and adding Professor Moriarty as the villain.

Steven Dietz's 2006 play Sherlock Holmes: The Final Adventure, adapted from the 1899 play Sherlock Holmes, merges the storylines of "A Scandal in Bohemia" and "The Final Problem". In this adaptation, Godfrey Norton is under the employ of Professor Moriarty and whose original plan was to rob Adler. However, they ended up falling in love, complicating the plan and forcing Moriarty to intervene when Holmes begins investigating on behalf of the King.

=== Film ===
The story was adapted as a 1921 silent short film as part of the Stoll film series starring Eille Norwood as Holmes. The adaptation includes a scene in which Holmes infiltrates the cast of a play in which Irene (here renamed Adair) is appearing and drugs her, stealing an envelope which contains only a letter from her fiancé. In her own letter to Holmes she says she has already burnt the photograph. Agreeing with his client that she was on a different level from him, Holmes adds that she was on a different level from Holmes himself too.

The 1946 film Dressed to Kill, starring Basil Rathbone as Sherlock Holmes and Nigel Bruce as Dr. Watson, features several references to "A Scandal in Bohemia", with Holmes and Watson discussing the recent publication of the story in The Strand Magazine (albeit anachronistically, the film takes place in its current day), and the villain of the film using the same trick on Watson that Holmes uses on Irene Adler in the story.

The Adventure of Sherlock Holmes' Smarter Brother, a 1975 Gene Wilder film, parodies the basic storyline, with the female lead replaced with a music hall singer.

The 1998 film Zero Effect is loosely based on the story, set in late 90s America, with Bill Pullman as Daryl Zero and Ben Stiller as Steve Arlo, both based on the Holmes and Watson characters, respectively. Kim Dickens plays Gloria Sullivan, the Irene Adler character, while Ryan O'Neal is Gregory Stark, the King of Bohemia equivalent.

=== Audio ===
The second episode of The Adventures of Sherlock Holmes featured an adaptation by Edith Meiser of the story on 27 October 1930 and starred Clive Brook as Holmes and Leigh Lovell as Watson. A remake of the script aired in March 1933, with Richard Gordon playing Sherlock Holmes and Leigh Lovell again playing Dr. Watson. Another remake of the script aired in August 1936, with Gordon as Holmes and Harry West as Watson.

Basil Rathbone and Nigel Bruce, who played Holmes and Watson in the film Dressed to Kill and other films, did the story for their radio series, The New Adventures of Sherlock Holmes. The episode aired on 10 December 1945, and was followed by a sequel, "Second Generation", featuring Irene's daughter hiring Holmes in retirement. "Second Generation" aired on 17 December 1945.

A radio adaptation starring John Gielgud as Holmes and Ralph Richardson as Watson aired in October 1954 on the BBC Light Programme. The production was also broadcast on NBC radio in January 1955, and on ABC radio in May 1956.

Michael Hardwick adapted the story as a radio production which aired on the BBC Light Programme in 1966, as part of the 1952–1969 radio series. Carleton Hobbs played Sherlock Holmes and Norman Shelley played Dr. Watson.

A radio adaptation was broadcast as an episode of the series CBS Radio Mystery Theater in 1977, with Kevin McCarthy as Sherlock Holmes and Court Benson as Dr. Watson. Marian Seldes played Irene Adler.

Bert Coules dramatised "A Scandal in Bohemia" for BBC Radio 4 in 1990, as an episode of the 1989–1998 radio series, starring Clive Merrison as Holmes and Michael Williams as Watson. It also featured Andrew Sachs as the King (Sachs would then go on to play Watson in Coules' radio series The Further Adventures of Sherlock Holmes in 2002–2010).

The story was adapted as a 2012 episode of the American radio series The Classic Adventures of Sherlock Holmes, with John Patrick Lowrie as Holmes and Lawrence Albert as Watson.

In 2025, the podcast Sherlock & Co. adapted the story in a five-episode adventure called, starring Harry Attwell as Sherlock Holmes, Paul Waggott as Dr. John Watson and Marta da Silva as Mariana "Mrs. Hudson" Ametxazurra. Ant McGinley voices Tom Gregson.

- In 2025, Paul Waggott from Sherlock & Co. podcast reprised his role as John Watson redoing the story in its original text from 1892's The Adventures of Sherlock Holmes as an Audiobook, from Watson's first person perspective.

=== Television ===
The story was adapted for a 1951 TV episode of We Present Alan Wheatley as Mr Sherlock Holmes in... starring Alan Wheatley as Holmes, Raymond Francis as Dr. Watson and Olga Edwardes as Irene Adler.

"A Scandal in Bohemia" was adapted as part of the Soviet television film series The Adventures of Sherlock Holmes and Dr. Watson, in the form of a flashback in The Treasures of Agra; two episodes adapting The Sign of the Four (1983, USSR). It starred Vasily Livanov as Sherlock Holmes, Vitaly Solomin as Dr. Watson, Georgiy Martirosyan as the King of Bohemia and Larisa Solovyova as Irene Adler.

"A Scandal in Bohemia" was adapted as the first episode of the 1984–1985 television series The Adventures of Sherlock Holmes. The episode featured Jeremy Brett as Holmes, David Burke as Watson, and Gayle Hunnicutt as Irene Adler, whose first name is pronounced "Irena" in this adaptation.

"A Scandal in Bohemia" was featured in a season-1 episode of the PBS series Wishbone, entitled "A Dogged Exposé". In the episode, the supporting human characters search for an incognito photographer at their school who has been publishing embarrassing photographs of students. Intermingled with the plot, the title character Wishbone portrays Sherlock Holmes in a slightly modified adaptation of the original story to compare with the events of the "real-life" plot.

A series of four television movies released between 2000 and 2002 starred Matt Frewer as Sherlock Holmes and Kenneth Welsh as Dr. Watson. The third of these films, The Royal Scandal (2001), adapted "A Scandal in Bohemia" and combined its story with "The Adventure of the Bruce-Partington Plans".

"A Scandal in Belgravia", episode one of the second series of the TV series Sherlock, was loosely adapted from the short story and aired on 1 January 2012, starring Benedict Cumberbatch as Holmes, Martin Freeman as Watson and Lara Pulver as Irene Adler. The plot of the short story – Holmes and Watson attempting to recover incriminating photos from Adler – is covered briefly in the first half of the episode updated for the contemporary period (Adler's photos are stored digitally on her mobile phone) and adjusted (the royal they incriminate is British and female); the episode then moves on to a storyline based on other Sherlock Holmes stories and films while including Adler, Mycroft Holmes (Mark Gatiss) and Jim Moriarty.

"A Scandal in Bohemia" is the inspiration for two consecutive episode of House. Three Stories (season 1, episode 21, aired Tue, 17 May 2005) and Honeymoon (season 1, episode 22, aired 24 May 2005). Sela Ward is Stacy Warner/Irene Adler.

"A Scandal in Bohemia" was adapted to the second episode "The Adventure of the Headmaster with Trouble" of NHK puppetry Sherlock Holmes. Holmes is a pupil of an imaginary boarding school Beeton School. One day he pretends to be ill and goes to the nurse's office to search the photo that Headmaster Ormstein and school nurse Irene Adler are in. But Adler sees through his feigned illness. Then Holmes and his roommate John H. Watson make a false fire to find the photo, but she penetrates their wiles and tells Holmes that she returned the photo to Ormstein.

The hereditary king makes an appearance in a season six episode of Elementary entitled "Breathe". In the episode, Holmes reveals to the king that his son had been involved in a series of spurious adoptions, similar to the real-life Princess Marie-Auguste of Anhalt.

=== Books ===
It was adapted into one of the books of the Hong Kong children's book series The Great Detective Sherlock Holmes, as "The Most Formidable Lady Nemesis" (史上最強的女敵手). It is Book #17 of the original Chinese version, and book #12 of the English version.
