= King of Scandinavia =

King of Scandinavia may refer to:

- MS King of Scandinavia, a Danish cruiseferry
- The monarch of one of the Scandinavian countries:
  - King of Denmark
  - King of Iceland
  - King of Norway
  - King of Sweden
- A fictional character referred to in A Scandal in Bohemia and The Adventure of the Noble Bachelor, two Sherlock Holmes stories by Arthur Conan Doyle
