= A Scandal in Bohemia (Sherlock Holmes episode) =

- Sherlock Holmes episode
- Episode no.: Series 1 Episode 1
- Directed by: Paul Annett
- Written by: John Hawkesworth
- Based on: "A Scandal in Bohemia" by Arthur Conan Doyle
- Original air date: 24 April 1984
- Running time: 55 minutes

"A Scandal in Bohemia" is the first episode of the series The Adventures of Sherlock Holmes, the first series in the Sherlock Holmes series which is based on Sir Arthur Conan Doyle stories. The series was produced by the British television company Granada Television between 1984 and 1994 and star Jeremy Brett as the famous detective. "A Scandal in Bohemia" is based on the short story of the same title. The episode was first aired at 9:00 pm in the United Kingdom on Tuesday, April 24, 1984, on ITV.

== Plot ==
As the episode begins, two burglars ransack the house of Irene Adler, a young and beautiful lady. Her coachman notices and Irene, armed with a revolver, forces them to go.

Via voice-over narration, Dr. Watson informs us that she is "the Woman" to Sherlock Holmes. The action shifts to the point of view of Holmes and Watson, where the former has received a letter whose sender says that they will drop by Holmes' residence that evening for a consultation. A masked visitor arrives, who introduces himself as "Count Von Kramm" of Bohemia, in reality the King of Bohemia, of the House of Ormstein, in disguise.

Ten years ago he came to know Adler, a singer, who now has a compromising photo of the two of them together. The King is due to marry a young Scandinavian princess, and if the photograph becomes public, the marriage would be called off. The King gives Holmes Irene's address before he leaves.

Over the course of two days, Holmes investigates Adler disguised as an unemployed groom. He learns that Adler has a regular visitor, a lawyer named Godfrey Norton of the Inner Temple. Recounting the story later to Watson, Holmes describes Adler as having a "face a man might die for," language Watson finds quite surprising coming from Holmes. Holmes (still in disguise) follows Adler and Norton to a church where they intend to get married. Needing a witness, they ask Homes (in disguise) to witness their marriage, after which Irene gives Holmes a sovereign as a souvenir.

Holmes conceives a plan involving him dressing up as a clergyman, staging a fight and then having Watson, using a plumber's smoke rocket, convince Irene Norton (née Adler) to reveal the location of the photograph. (She would, logically, want to rescue the most valuable object in her home, in this case the photograph.) Irene sees through the ruse, but Holmes still locates the hiding place. Holmes plans to visit Irene with Watson and the King the next day, undisguised, to collect the photograph. A young man greets Holmes by name as Holmes and Watson return to Baker Street.

When they arrive the next day, Irene has left England in self-exile. She has left in the secret compartment a different photograph, this one of herself alone, and a letter addressed to Holmes, saying that she had tailed him dressed as a man. She says she has no interest any more in blackmailing the King. The King offers Holmes a valuable ring as a reward. Instead, Holmes ask for the photograph of the lady who had tricked him.

== Cast ==
| Character | Played By |
|---|---|
| Sherlock Holmes | Jeremy Brett |
| Dr. Watson | David Burke |
| Irene Adler | Gayle Hunnicutt |
| King of Bohemia | Wolf Kahler |
| Godfrey Norton | Michael Carter |
| John | Max Faulkner |
| Cabby | Tim Pearce |
| Mrs. Hudson | Rosalie Williams |
| Mrs. Willard | Tessa Worsley |
| Clergyman | Will Tacey |

== See also ==
- The Red-Headed League (Sherlock Holmes)
