= The Boscombe Valley Mystery =

Short story by Arthur Conan Doyle featuring Sherlock Holmes

- Short story by Sir Arthur Conan Doyle
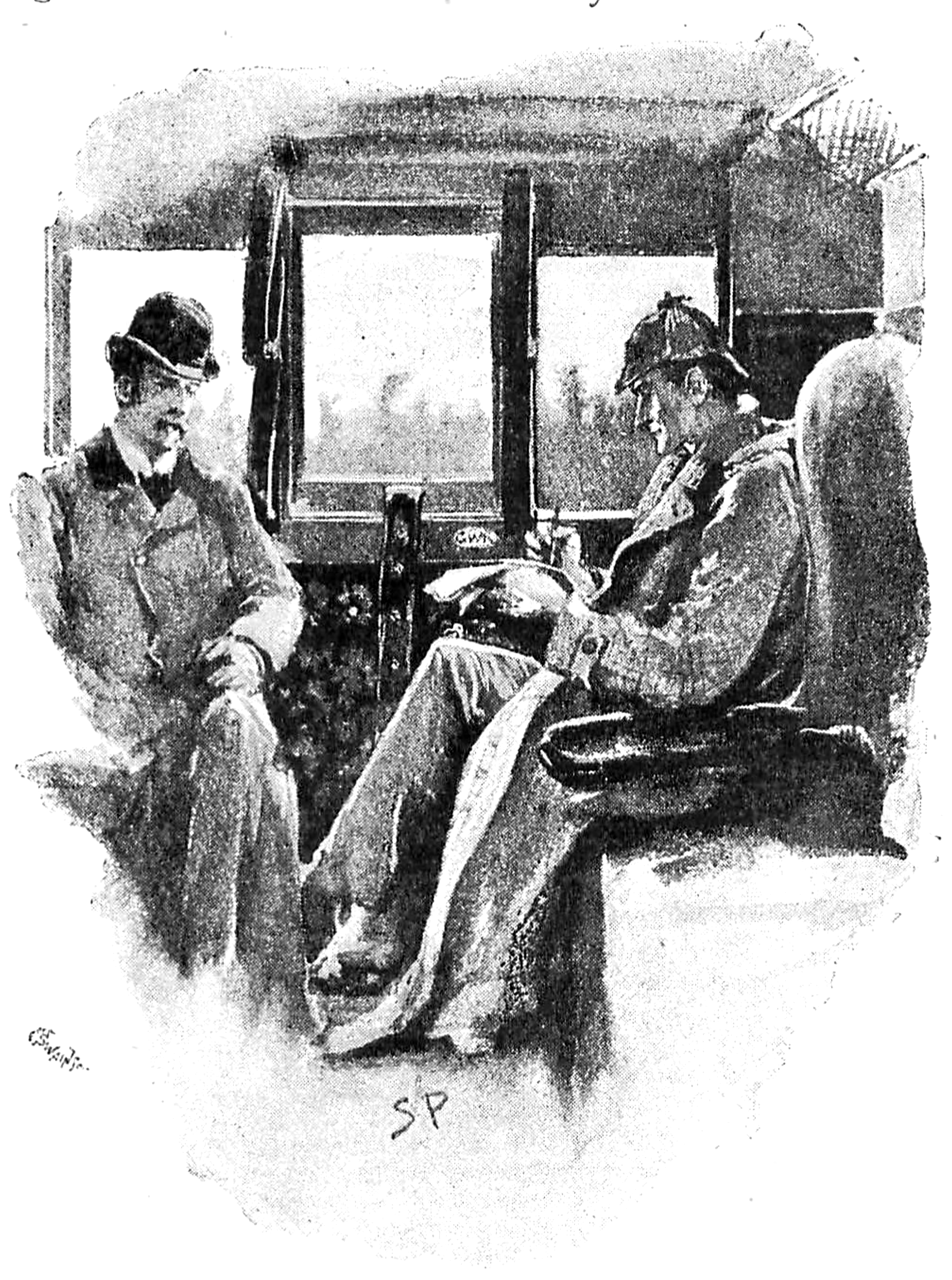
- Watson and Holmes on the train to Boscombe Valley, 1891 illustration by Sidney Paget

Text available at Wikisource
- Country: United Kingdom
- Language: English
- Genre: Detective fiction short stories

Publication
- Published in: Strand Magazine
- Publication date: October 1891

Chronology
- Series: The Adventures of Sherlock Holmes
A Case of Identity	The Five Orange Pips

"The Boscombe Valley Mystery", one of the fifty-six short Sherlock Holmes stories written by Sir Arthur Conan Doyle, is the fourth of the twelve stories in The Adventures of Sherlock Holmes. It was first published in the Strand Magazine in October 1891.

== Plot ==
John Turner, a widower and a major landowner who has a daughter named Alice, lives in Herefordshire with a fellow expatriate from Australia, Charles McCarthy, a widower who has a son named James. Charles has been found dead near Boscombe Pool; it was reported that he was there to meet someone. Two witnesses testify that they saw Charles walking into the woods followed by James, who was carrying a gun. Patience Moran, daughter of a lodgekeeper, says that she saw the two arguing and that, when James raised his hand as if to hit his father, she ran to her mother; and while she was telling her mother what she saw, James rushed to their house seeking help. The Morans followed James back to the Pool, where they found his father dead. James was arrested and charged with murder. Alice believes that James is innocent and has contacted Inspector Lestrade, who in turn seeks help from Sherlock Holmes.

James confirms the testimonies of the witnesses but explains that he was going into the woods to hunt, not to follow his father. He later heard his father calling "Cooee" and found him standing by the pool, surprised to see him. They argued heatedly, and James decided to return to their farm. Shortly after that he heard his father cry out and returned to find him lying on the ground. James insists that he tried to help him, but his father died in his arms. James refuses to give the cause of their argument, despite the coroner's warning that it could be damaging to his case if he does not reveal it. James also remembers that his father's last words were something about "a rat", but James is uncertain of their meaning in the situation. He also thinks he saw a cloak on the ground, which vanished while he was helping his father.

Alice meets Holmes, Lestrade and Dr. Watson in a hotel, and hopes that Holmes has found a way to prove James's innocence. She also believes that she was the subject of the argument between the McCarthys – Charles wanted his son to marry her, but James had refused. Alice had taken James' side out of respect for him, and her father was also against the union. Holmes asks Alice if he could meet her father, but she says his health worsened after the death of Charles, whom he had known since they were in Victoria. Holmes decides to see James.

Holmes mistakenly surmises that James knows who killed his father and is protecting someone. It emerges that Alice is right about the cause of the argument between James and Charles. What she does not know is that James actually loves her but could not follow his father's demand because he had married a barmaid before Alice had returned from boarding school. This burdened him, but he could not tell his father about his marriage because he would have been kicked out of the house and left unable to support himself. When his wife heard of his troubles, however, she confessed that she was already married before they met, and therefore their marriage is invalid.

Holmes, Watson and Lestrade go to the farm, and examine Charles's and James's boots. They then head to Boscombe Pool, following the track from the courtyard. After examining the ground, Holmes finds evidence of the presence of another man, besides Charles and James, whom he believes to be the murderer. Holmes deduces that the killer is left-handed (because Charles was struck neatly on the left side of his head from behind, where a right-handed man would have struck him on the other side), and that the stranger is tall, has a limp and smokes cigars. Lestrade is not convinced.

At the hotel, Holmes explains to Watson that "Cooee" is an Australian cry and that the apparent reference to "a rat", overheard by James, in fact comprised the last syllables of "Ballarat", a place in Australia. The person Charles was meeting was, therefore, someone he knew from Australia. John Turner, Alice's father, then comes to their room (coincidentally being announced by a hotel employee right as Watson is about to name him as the killer, after correctly interpreting the hints Holmes has offered him), entering with a limp, and, realising that Holmes has deduced the crime, confesses.

In his confession, John explains that he was a member of the Ballarat Gang, a group of bushrangers in Australia. They robbed a gold convoy in which Charles was the wagon driver, and John spared his life despite knowing that Charles could later identify him. The loot made the surviving gang members rich, and they moved to England. Resolved to change, John parted ways with his friends. He bought land and got married, and then Alice was born. Some time later, Charles tracked down John and threatened to blackmail him unless he and his son were provided for. In response, John gave Charles the farm and money, hoping this would satisfy him. However, this was not enough, and Charles eventually demanded the marriage of James and Alice. Although he liked James, John did not want Charles' "cursed blood" mixed with his family's, so he resisted the union. After much pressure, John agreed to meet Charles secretly at the Pool to resolve the matter. Seeing Charles and James there arguing, John hid, intending to wait until James left. However, he became angry when he heard the nature of the argument and killed Charles to preserve his freedom and spare his daughter. James heard his father's death cry and returned, but John was able to hide in the woods. He had to return later to retrieve the cloak that he had dropped in his haste.

John signs his statement, and Holmes vows to keep it secret unless it is needed to free James. In the end, Holmes's objections are sufficient to acquit James, and John dies seven months after the meeting with Holmes and Watson. Meanwhile, Watson surmises that James and Alice will likely marry and live in happiness without ever discovering the true history of their fathers.

== Possible basis for Boscombe Valley ==
En route to the murder scene Holmes tells Watson that "Boscombe Valley is a country district not very far from Ross, in Herefordshire." There is no real location matching this description. Leslie S. Klinger, in his The New Annotated Sherlock Holmes, calls it "a disguised name" and lists possible locations for the setting of the story as posited by other researchers.

== Publication history ==
"The Boscombe Valley Mystery" was published in the UK in The Strand Magazine in October 1891, and in the United States in the US edition of the Strand in November 1891. The story was published with ten illustrations by Sidney Paget in The Strand Magazine. It was included in the short story collection The Adventures of Sherlock Holmes, which was published in October 1892.

== Adaptations ==
=== Film and television ===
One of the short films in the Sherlock Holmes Éclair film series (1912) was based on the story. In the short film, Georges Tréville played Sherlock Holmes and Mr Moyse played Dr. Watson. Another short film based on the story was released in 1922 as part of the Sherlock Holmes Stoll film series, with Eille Norwood as Sherlock Holmes and Hubert Willis as Dr. Watson.

The 1968 television series Sherlock Holmes, starring Peter Cushing as Holmes and Nigel Stock as Dr. Watson, dramatised this story for its sixth episode. Lestrade is replaced by a local policeman, Inspector Lanner, and Charles McCarthy's first name has been changed to Bill. John Turner dies immediately after confessing to Holmes.

In the 1991 TV adaption starring Jeremy Brett and Edward Hardwicke, Boscombe Valley is in Cheshire in the northwest of England. Inspector Lestrade of Scotland Yard does not appear; instead Holmes cooperates with one Inspector Summerby. A young James Purefoy stars as James McCarthy.

=== Theatre ===
The 2007 Edinburgh Fringe Festival featured the show Murder in the Gardens, which relocates the events of this mystery to Edinburgh, with the murder taking place in Princes Street Gardens and Holmes and Watson being called upon as Watson is lecturing at the university. In this case, the murder was committed by Alice's mother to protect the memory of her already-deceased husband, and Watson is able to clear James without that testimony as his examination confirms that James couldn't have struck the blow that killed his father while Holmes identifies and confronts the true killer in private.

=== Audio ===
"The Boscombe Valley Mystery" was adapted by Edith Meiser as an episode of the radio series The Adventures of Sherlock Holmes with Richard Gordon as Sherlock Holmes and Leigh Lovell as Dr. Watson. Meiser also adapted the story for The New Adventures of Sherlock Holmes for a 1940 episode with Basil Rathbone as Holmes and Nigel Bruce as Watson.

In 1943, the BBC Home Service dramatised the story with Arthur Wontner as Holmes and Carleton Hobbs as Watson. A different radio adaptation aired on the BBC Light Programme in 1966, as part of the 1952–1969 radio series starring Hobbs as Holmes and Norman Shelley as Watson.

In May 1977 an episode of CBS Radio Mystery Theater titled "The Boscombe Pool Mystery". The episode, which featured Kevin McCarthy as Sherlock Holmes and Court Benson as Dr. Watson.

In 1990, for BBC Radio 4 by Bert Coules, as part of the 1989–1998 radio series starring Clive Merrison as Holmes and Michael Williams as Watson. It also featured Samuel West as James McCarthy and Donald Gee as Inspector Lestrade.

A 2011 episode of the radio series The Classic Adventures of Sherlock Holmes was adapted from the story, with John Patrick Lowrie as Holmes and Lawrence Albert as Watson.

In July 2026, the podcast Sherlock & Co. adapted the story in a three-episode adventure called "The Boscombe Valley Mystery", starring Harry Attwell as Sherlock Holmes, Paul Waggott as Dr. John Watson and Marta da Silva as Mariana "Mrs. Hudson" Ametxazurra. John Turner is played by Stef Butler, Charles McCarthy by Karim Kronfli, and Jasmin Kerr as Lily Lestrade. As a modern retelling, the hotel location is swapped for a wellness retreat in the Cotswolds.
