= The Adventure of the Beryl Coronet =

Short story by Arthur Conan Doyle featuring Sherlock Holmes

"The Adventure Of The Beryl Coronet"
- Short story by Arthur Conan Doyle
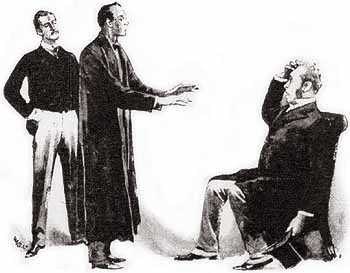
- Holmes, Watson and Holder, 1892 illustration by Sidney Paget

Text available at Wikisource
- Country: The United Kingdom
- Language: English
- Genre: Detective fiction short stories

Publication
- Published in: Strand Magazine
- Publication date: May 1892

Chronology
- Series: The Adventures of Sherlock Holmes
The Adventure of the Noble Bachelor	The Adventure of the Copper Beeches

"The Adventure of the Beryl Coronet", one of the 56 short Sherlock Holmes stories written by Sir Arthur Conan Doyle, is the eleventh of the twelve stories collected in The Adventures of Sherlock Holmes. The story was first published in The Strand Magazine in May 1892.

== Plot ==
A coronet of a British earl

A banker named Mr Alexander Holder makes a loan of £50,000 (equivalent to £5,619,000 in 2025) (Note: This calculation assumes that the story takes place in 1886, which is suggested by Leslie S. Klinger in Volume I (p. 761) of The New Annotated Sherlock Holmes (W.W. Norton, 2005). The year in which the story takes place is not stated in the story, and could be considered slightly different.) to a client from one of the "highest, noblest, most exalted names in England," implied to be a member of the British Royal Family and, thus, a son of Queen Victoria and an heir to the throne. The client leaves the beryl coronet, described as one of the "most precious public possessions of the empire," as collateral. Feeling his bank's personal safe is insufficient to protect such a rare and valuable piece of jewellery, he takes it to his home in Streatham and keeps it in his dressing room. However, he and his niece Mary later find his son Arthur holding the coronet, seemingly trying to bend it, with three beryls missing from it. A panicked Holder seeks out Sherlock Holmes for help.

Despite the damning evidence against Arthur, who refuses to give a statement, Holmes is unconvinced. With the threat of Holder's reputation being besmirched and a national scandal weighing heavily on his mind, Holmes determines Arthur could not have broken the coronet on his own without making noise, notices footprints in the snow outside Holder's home, and considers Holder's servants, Mary, and Arthur's rakish friend Sir George Burnwell as potential suspects.

Eventually, Holmes concludes Burnwell is a notorious criminal who conspired with Mary, unaware of his real identity, to steal the coronet. Arthur caught the pair in the act and broke the coronet while trying to take it back from Burnwell before taking the blame for Mary out of love for her. Though Burnwell and Mary escape justice, Holmes is convinced they will receive their punishment in due time. He later buys back the missing beryls from a fence that Burnwell sold them to, receives compensation from Holder, and tells him to apologize to Arthur for assuming he was the thief.

== Publication history ==
"The Adventure of the Beryl Coronet" was first published in the UK in The Strand Magazine in May 1892, and in the United States in the US edition of the Strand in June 1892. The story was published with nine illustrations by Sidney Paget in The Strand Magazine. It was included in the short story collection The Adventures of Sherlock Holmes, which was published in October 1892.

== Adaptations ==
=== Film and television ===
The 1912 short film The Beryl Coronet was released in the Éclair film series featuring Georges Tréville as Sherlock Holmes.

The story was dramatised as a 1921 silent short film as part of the Stoll film series starring Eille Norwood as Holmes.

The story was adapted for an episode of the 1965 television series Sherlock Holmes with Douglas Wilmer as Holmes, Nigel Stock as Watson, Leonard Sachs as Holder, Suzan Farmer as Mary and David Burke as Sir George Burnwell. Burke would later play Watson opposite Jeremy Brett in the first two seasons of The Adventures of Sherlock Holmes.

A 2001 episode of the animated television series Sherlock Holmes in the 22nd Century, titled "The Adventure of the Beryl Board", was based on the story.

The story was used in part in the Elementary episode 'How the Sausage Is Made.'

=== Audio ===
Edith Meiser adapted the story as an episode of the radio series The Adventures of Sherlock Holmes which aired on 28 January 1932, with Richard Gordon as Sherlock Holmes and Leigh Lovell as Dr Watson. Other episodes adapted from the story aired on 24 March 1935 (with Louis Hector as Holmes and Lovell as Watson) and 26 September 1936 (with Gordon as Holmes and Harry West as Watson).

A dramatisation of "The Beryl Coronet" was broadcast on the BBC Light Programme on 30 June 1959, as part of the 1952–1969 radio series starring Carleton Hobbs as Holmes and Norman Shelley as Watson. The cast also included Frederick Treves as Arthur Holder and Ronald Baddiley as Roberts. It was adapted by Michael Hardwick.

"The Adventure of the Beryl Coronet" was dramatised as a 1977 episode of the series CBS Radio Mystery Theater with Kevin McCarthy as Sherlock Holmes and Court Benson as Dr. Watson.

The story was adapted by Vincent McInerney for BBC Radio 4 in 1991 as an episode of the 1989–1998 radio series starring Clive Merrison as Holmes and Michael Williams as Watson. It featured Anthony Newlands as Holder, Angus Wright as Arthur, Petra Markham as Mary, and Timothy Carlton (father of Benedict Cumberbatch, another famous Sherlock) as Sir George Burnwell.

A 2010 episode of the radio series The Classic Adventures of Sherlock Holmes was adapted from the story, with John Patrick Lowrie as Holmes and Lawrence Albert as Watson.

Radio Mirchi Bangla adapted this story for their Sunday Suspense series on 12 September 2021. Mir enacted as Sherlock Holmes and Deep enacted the role of Dr. Watson.

In 2026, the podcast Sherlock & Co. adapted the story in a two-episode adventure, starring Harry Attwell as Sherlock Holmes, Paul Waggott as Dr. John Watson and Marta da Silva as Mariana "Mrs. Hudson" Ametxazurra. Kieran Wesley voices George Burnwell. In this adaptation the Beryl Coronet is instead a manuscript for a story about a Sherlock Holmes pastiche.

- In 2026, Paul Waggott from Sherlock & Co. podcast reprised his role as John Watson redoing the story in its original text from 1892's The Adventures of Sherlock Holmes as an Audiobook, from Watson's first person perspective.

=== Print ===
The novel The Further Adventures of Sherlock Holmes: The Improbable Prisoner by Stuart Douglas is a subtle 'sequel' to this story.
