= The Adventures of Sherlock Holmes =

Collection of short stories by Arthur Conan Doyle

- Front cover of the first edition
- Author: Arthur Conan Doyle
- Illustrator: Sidney Paget
- Language: English
- Series: Sherlock Holmes
- Genre: Detective fiction
- Publisher: George Newnes
- Publication date: 14 October 1892
- Publication place: United Kingdom
- Pages: 307
- Preceded by: The Sign of the Four
- Followed by: The Memoirs of Sherlock Holmes
- Text: The Adventures of Sherlock Holmes at Wikisource

The Adventures of Sherlock Holmes is a collection of short stories by British writer Arthur Conan Doyle, first published on 14 October, 1892. It contains the earliest short stories featuring the consulting detective Sherlock Holmes, which had been published in twelve monthly issues of The Strand Magazine, from July 1891 to June 1892. The stories are collected in the same sequence, which is not supported by any fictional chronology. The only characters common to all twelve are Holmes and Dr. Watson, and all are relayed in first-person narrative from Watson's point of view.

In general, the stories in The Adventures of Sherlock Holmes identify, and try to correct, social injustices. Holmes is portrayed as offering a new, fairer sense of justice. The stories were well received, and boosted the subscriptions figures of The Strand Magazine, prompting Doyle to be able to demand more money for his next set of stories. The first story, "A Scandal in Bohemia", includes the character of Irene Adler, who, despite being featured only within this one story by Doyle, is a prominent character in modern Sherlock Holmes adaptations, often as a love interest for Holmes. Doyle included four of the stories from this collection in his twelve favourite Sherlock Holmes stories, picking "The Adventure of the Speckled Band" as his overall favourite.

== Context ==
Arthur Conan Doyle began writing while studying medicine at university in the late 1870s, and had his first short story, "The Mystery of Sasassa Valley", published in September 1879. Eight years later, his first Sherlock Holmes story, the novel A Study in Scarlet, was published by Ward Lock & Co. It was well received, but Doyle was paid little for it; after a sequel novel, The Sign of the Four, was published in Lippincott's Monthly Magazine, he shifted his focus to short stories. Soon after The Strand Magazine was inaugurated in January 1891, its editor Herbert Greenhough Smith received two submissions to the new monthly from Doyle. Later he described his reaction: "I at once realised that here was the greatest short story writer since Edgar Allan Poe." The first of them, "A Scandal in Bohemia", was published near the back of the July issue with ten illustrations by Sidney Paget. The stories proved popular, helping to boost the circulation of the magazine, and Doyle was paid 30 guineas each for the initial run of twelve. These first twelve stories were published monthly from July 1891 until June 1892, and then were collected together and published as a book, The Adventures of Sherlock Holmes on 14 October 1892 by George Newnes, the publisher of The Strand Magazine. The initial print run of the book was for 10,000 copies in the United Kingdom, and a further 4,500 copies in the United States, which were published by Harper Brothers the following day.

Sidney Paget illustrated all twelve stories in The Strand and in the collection. The preceding Holmes novels had been illustrated by other artists.

== Stories ==
=== Summary ===
All of the stories within The Adventures of Sherlock Holmes are told in a first-person narrative from the point of view of Dr. Watson, as is the case for all but four of the Sherlock Holmes stories. The Oxford Dictionary of National Biography entry for Doyle suggests that the short stories contained in The Adventures of Sherlock Holmes tend to point out social injustices, such as "a king's betrayal of an opera singer, a stepfather's deception of his ward as a fictitious lover, an aristocratic crook's exploitation of a failing pawnbroker, a beggar's extensive estate in Kent." It suggests that, in contrast, Holmes is portrayed as offering a fresh and fair approach in an unjust world of "official incompetence and aristocratic privilege". The Adventures of Sherlock Holmes contains many of Doyle's favourite Sherlock Holmes stories. In 1927, he submitted a list of what he believed were his twelve best Sherlock Holmes stories to The Strand Magazine. Among those he listed were "The Adventure of the Speckled Band" (as his favourite), "The Red-Headed League" (second), "A Scandal in Bohemia" (fifth) and "The Five Orange Pips" (seventh). The book was banned in the Soviet Union in 1929 because of its alleged "occultism", but gained popularity in a black market of similarly banned books, and the restriction was lifted in 1940.

=== Publication sequence ===
Stories by publication sequence
Title	Publication	Plot	Ref.
"A Scandal in Bohemia"	July 1891	The King of Bohemia engages Holmes to recover an indiscreet photograph showing him with the renowned beauty, adventuress and opera singer Irene Adler, the revelation of which would derail his marriage.	
"The Red-Headed League"	August 1891	Jabez Wilson, a pawnbroker, consults Holmes about a job which he gained only because of his red hair.	
"A Case of Identity"	September 1891	Against the wishes of her stepfather, Mary Sutherland has become engaged to Hosmer Angel. On the morning of their wedding Angel disappears en route to the church.	
"The Boscombe Valley Mystery"	October 1891	Inspector Lestrade asks for Holmes's help after Charles McCarthy is murdered and McCarthy's son James is implicated.	
"The Five Orange Pips"	November 1891	John Openshaw tells Holmes that in 1883 his uncle died two months after receiving a letter inscribed "K.K.K." with five orange pips enclosed, and that in 1885 his father died soon after receiving a similar letter.	
"The Man with the Twisted Lip"	December 1891	Neville St. Clair, a respectable businessman, has disappeared and his wife claims that she has seen him at the upper window of an opium den.	
"The Adventure of the Blue Carbuncle"	January 1892	A "Blue Carbuncle" jewel is stolen from a hotel suite, and a former felon is soon arrested. However, an acquaintance of Holmes discovers the gemstone in the crop of a Christmas goose.	
"The Adventure of the Speckled Band"	February 1892	Helen Stoner worries that her stepfather may be trying to kill her after he contrives to move her to the bedroom where her sister had died two years earlier, shortly before her wedding.	
"The Adventure of the Engineer's Thumb"	March 1892	An engineer, Victor Hatherley, attends Dr Watson's surgery after his thumb is chopped off, and recounts his tale to Watson and Holmes.	
"The Adventure of the Noble Bachelor"	April 1892	Lord Robert St. Simon's new American bride, Hatty Doran, has disappeared almost immediately after the wedding.	
"The Adventure of the Beryl Coronet"	May 1892	A banker asks Holmes to investigate after a "Beryl Coronet" entrusted to him is damaged at his home.	
"The Adventure of the Copper Beeches"	June 1892	Violet Hunter consults Holmes after being offered a governess job subject to a number of unusual conditions, including cutting her hair short.	

== Critical reception ==
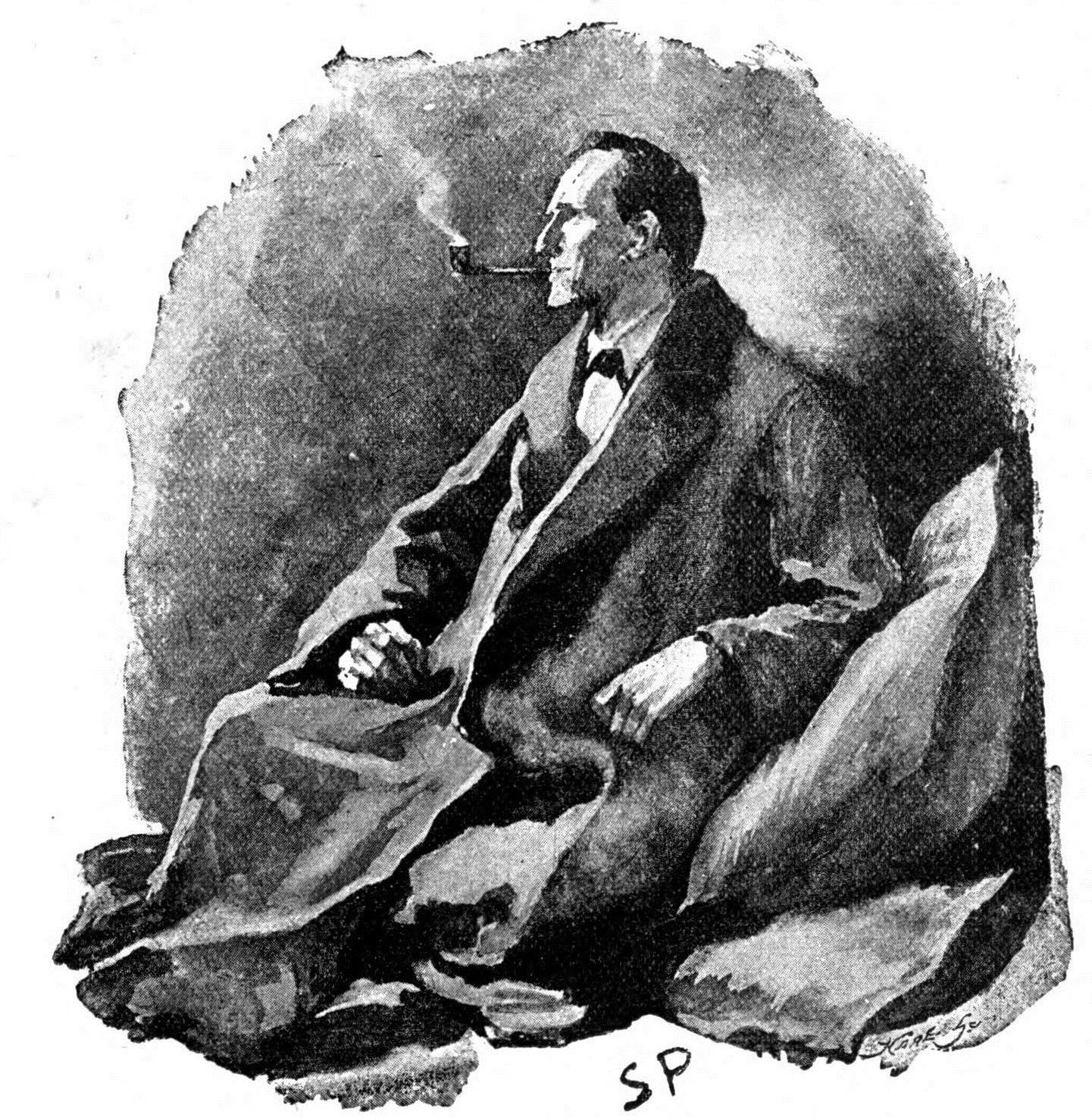
Illustration by Sidney Paget of Sherlock Holmes, from "The Man with the Twisted Lip".

The Adventures of Sherlock Holmes were well received upon their serialisation in The Strand Magazine. Following the publication of "A Scandal in Bohemia" in July 1891, the Hull Daily Mail described the story as being "worthy of the inventive genius" of Doyle. Just over a year later, when Doyle took a break from publishing the short stories upon the completion of The Adventures of Sherlock Holmes, a piece in the Belfast News Letter reviewed a story by another author in The Strand Magazine saying that it "might have been read with a moderate amount of interest a year ago", but that "the unique power" of Doyle's writing was evident in the gulf in quality between the stories. The Leeds Mercury particularly praised the characterisation of Holmes, "with all his little foibles", while in contrast the Cheltenham Looker-On described Holmes as "rather a bore sometimes", noting that descriptions of his foibles "grows wearisome". The correspondent for Hampshire Telegraph lamented the fact that Doyle's more thoughtful writing, such as Micah Clarke, was not so popular as the Holmes stories, concluding that an author "who wishes to make literature pay must write what his readers want".

== Adaptations ==
Sherlock Holmes has been adapted numerous times for both films and plays, and the character has been played by over 70 different actors in more than 200 films. A number of film and television series have borne the title "The Adventures of Sherlock Holmes", but some of these are either original stories, combinations of a number of Doyle's stories, or in one case, an adaptation of The Sign of the Four.

Irene Adler, who is in the first short story, "A Scandal in Bohemia", is prominent in many modern adaptations, despite only appearing in one story. Often in modern adaptations, she is portrayed as a love interest for Holmes, as in Robert Doherty's Elementary and the BBC's Sherlock, even though in the story itself, the narration claims: "It was not that he felt any emotion akin to love for Irene Adler." In his Sherlock Holmes Handbook, Christopher Redmond notes "the Canon provides little basis for either sentimental or prurient speculation about a Holmes-Adler connection."

Multiple series have featured adaptations of all or nearly all of the stories in this collection, including the 1921–1923 Stoll film series (all except "The Five Orange Pips"), the radio series The Adventures of Sherlock Holmes (1930–1936), the 1939–1950 radio series The New Adventures of Sherlock Holmes (all except "The Beryl Coronet"), and the BBC Sherlock Holmes 1952–1969 radio series. Many of the stories from the collection were included as episodes in the Granada Television series Sherlock Holmes which ran from 1984 until 1994. The stories in The Adventures of Sherlock Holmes were dramatised for BBC Radio 4 in 1990–1991 as part of the BBC Sherlock Holmes 1989–1998 radio series, and were adapted as episodes of the radio series The Classic Adventures of Sherlock Holmes (2005–2016). The stories within the collection have also been adapted for many other productions.

== Sources ==
- Doyle, Arthur Conan (2005). Klinger, Leslie (ed.). The New Annotated Sherlock Holmes. Volume I. New York: W.W. Norton. ISBN 0-393-05916-2. OCLC 57490922.
