= Sherlock Holmes (1984 TV series) =

British TV series

- Original opening title card. In subsequent series, this wording changed.
- Created by: Michael Cox
- Starring: Jeremy Brett; David Burke; Edward Hardwicke; Charles Gray; Colin Jeavons; Eric Porter; Rosalie Williams
- Composer: Patrick Gowers
- Country of origin: United Kingdom
- Original language: English
- No. of series: 7
- No. of episodes: 41 (of which, 5 feature-length specials) (list of episodes)

Production
- Running time: 50 to 104 minutes
- Production company: Granada Television

Original release
- Network: ITV
- Release: 24 April 1984 – 11 April 1994

Sherlock Holmes is the overall title given to the series of Sherlock Holmes adaptations produced by the British television company Granada Television between 24 April 1984 and 11 April 1994.

Of the 60 Holmes stories written by Arthur Conan Doyle, 43 were adapted in the series, spanning 36 one-hour episodes and five feature-length specials. Episode 35 "The Eligible Bachelor" has material from both "The Adventure of the Noble Bachelor" and "The Adventure of the Veiled Lodger", while episode 40 incorporates the plot lines of both "The Adventure of the Mazarin Stone" and "The Adventure of the Three Garridebs".

The series was broadcast on the ITV network in the UK and starred Jeremy Brett as Holmes. Watson was played by David Burke in the first series (Adventures) and by Edward Hardwicke from the second series (Return) onwards.

== Plot ==
In the late Victorian era, Sherlock Holmes is the world's only consulting detective. His practice is largely with private clients, but he is also known to assist the police, often in the shape of Inspector Lestrade, when their cases overlap. His clients range from private citizens of modest means to members of royalty. His ability to spot clues easily overlooked by others, and to apply both specialist knowledge—chemistry, botany, anatomy—and deductive reasoning, enable him to solve the most complex cases. He is assisted in his work by military veteran Dr. John Watson, with whom he shares rooms at 221B Baker Street.

Holmes craves mental stimulation, and is known to relapse into depression, and drug use when there are no sufficiently complex cases to engage him.

== Cast ==
=== Main ===
- Jeremy Brett as Sherlock Holmes (1984–1994). Brett had earlier portrayed Dr Watson on stage in the Los Angeles production of The Crucifer of Blood. Brett's portrayal remains very popular and is accepted by many as definitive.
- David Burke as Dr. Watson (1984–1985). He earlier played the villain in "The Adventure of the Beryl Coronet" for the 1965 BBC series (starring Douglas Wilmer and Nigel Stock). He left to join the Royal Shakespeare Company.
- Edward Hardwicke as Dr. Watson (1986–1994). He earlier had a role in an adaptation of "The Greek Interpreter" for the 1968 BBC series
- Rosalie Williams as Mrs Hudson (1984–1994)

=== Supporting ===
- Colin Jeavons as Inspector Lestrade (1985–1992). He also played Moriarty in The Baker Street Boys (1982).
- Eric Porter as Professor Moriarty (1985–1986). He appeared in "The Red-Headed League", "The Final Problem" and "The Empty House". Archive footage was also used for "The Devil's Foot" and "The Eligible Bachelor".
- Charles Gray as Mycroft Holmes in "The Greek Interpreter", "The Bruce-Partington Plans", "The Golden Pince-Nez" and "The Mazarin Stone" (1985, 1988, 1994). Played the same character in the 1976 film The Seven-Per-Cent Solution.
- Brian Miller as Inspector Bradstreet in "The Blue Carbuncle" (1984)
- Denis Lill as Inspector Bradstreet (1986, 1988, 1994) in "The Man with the Twisted Lip", "The Bruce-Partington Plans" and "The Mazarin Stone"
- John Labonowski as Inspector Athelney Jones in "The Red-Headed League" (1985)
- Emrys James as Inspector Athelney Jones in "The Sign of Four" (1987)
- Paul Williamson as Inspector Stanley Hopkins in "The Abbey Grange" (1986)
- Nigel Planer as Inspector Stanley Hopkins in "The Adventure of the Golden Pince-Nez" (1994)
- Tom Chadbon as Inspector Hawkins in "The Red Circle" and "The Cardboard Box" (1994)

The role of the servant Joe Barnes who impersonates Lady Beatrice in the 1991 episode "Shoscombe Old Place" was played by Jude Law, who later played Dr. Watson in the 2009 film Sherlock Holmes and its 2011 sequel Sherlock Holmes: A Game of Shadows.

Freddie Jones made two guest appearances in the show as different characters, appearing in "Wisteria Lodge" as Inspector Baynes and "The Last Vampyre" as a pedlar. Michael Wynne also made two guest appearances in the show as different characters, appearing in "Shoscombe Old Place" as Josiah Barnes and "The Mazarin Stone" as Commissionaire Jenkins. Helen Ryan also made two guest appearances in the show as different characters, appearing in "The Norwood Builder" as Mrs McFarlane, and in "The Mazarin Stone" as the Princess of Wales (a role she previously played in Edward the Seventh). Kenneth Connor made his last filmed appearance in "The Red Circle" as Mr Warren, which was broadcast posthumously in 1994, a year after his death.

== Episodes ==
The programme ran for four series and 41 episodes: 36 ran for 50 minutes, and 5 were feature-length specials.

| Series | Episodes | Originally released | |
| Series | Episodes | First released | Last released |
|---|---|---|---|
| The Adventures of Sherlock Holmes | 13 | 24 April 1984 | 29 September 1985 |
| The Return of Sherlock Holmes | 13 | 9 July 1986 | 31 August 1988 |
| The Case-Book of Sherlock Holmes | 9 | 21 February 1991 | 3 February 1993 |
| The Memoirs of Sherlock Holmes | 6 | 7 March 1994 | 11 April 1994 |

== Production ==
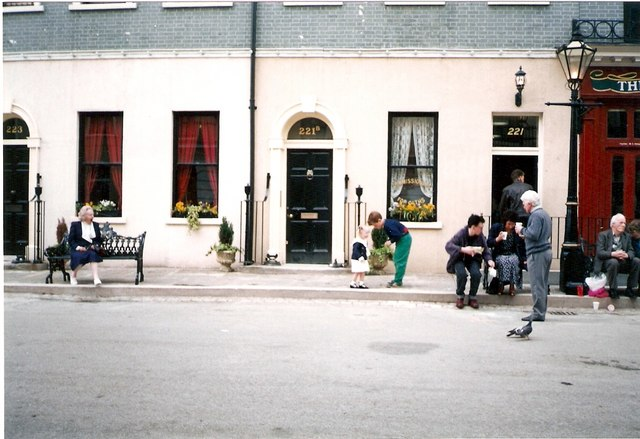
The Baker Street set at Granada Studios

The series was initially produced by Michael Cox, with later episodes produced by June Wyndham Davies. It was developed for television by screenwriter John Hawkesworth, who also wrote many of the episodes (all based on individual Doyle stories). Other writers to adapt Doyle's short stories in the series included Alexander Baron, Jeremy Paul, T. R. Bowen, and Alan Plater.

Brett had been approached in February 1982 by Granada to play Holmes. The idea was to make a totally authentic and faithful adaptation of the character's best cases. Eventually Brett accepted the role and was very attentive to discrepancies between the scripts he had been given and Doyle's original stories.

To shoot the series, a full-scale outdoor replica of Baker Street was constructed at Granada's studios in Quay Street, Manchester, which later formed a central part of the Granada Studios Tour tourist attraction, before that venue's closure in 1999.

Most of the locations used for filming can be found in Cheshire, Liverpool and Manchester.

The series came to an end owing to the death of Brett at the age of 61 from heart failure in 1995. He had suffered from ill health during filming of the later series due to adverse reactions to the medicine prescribed for depression. It was an affliction he was prone to, episodically, throughout his life. In his later life, it worsened.

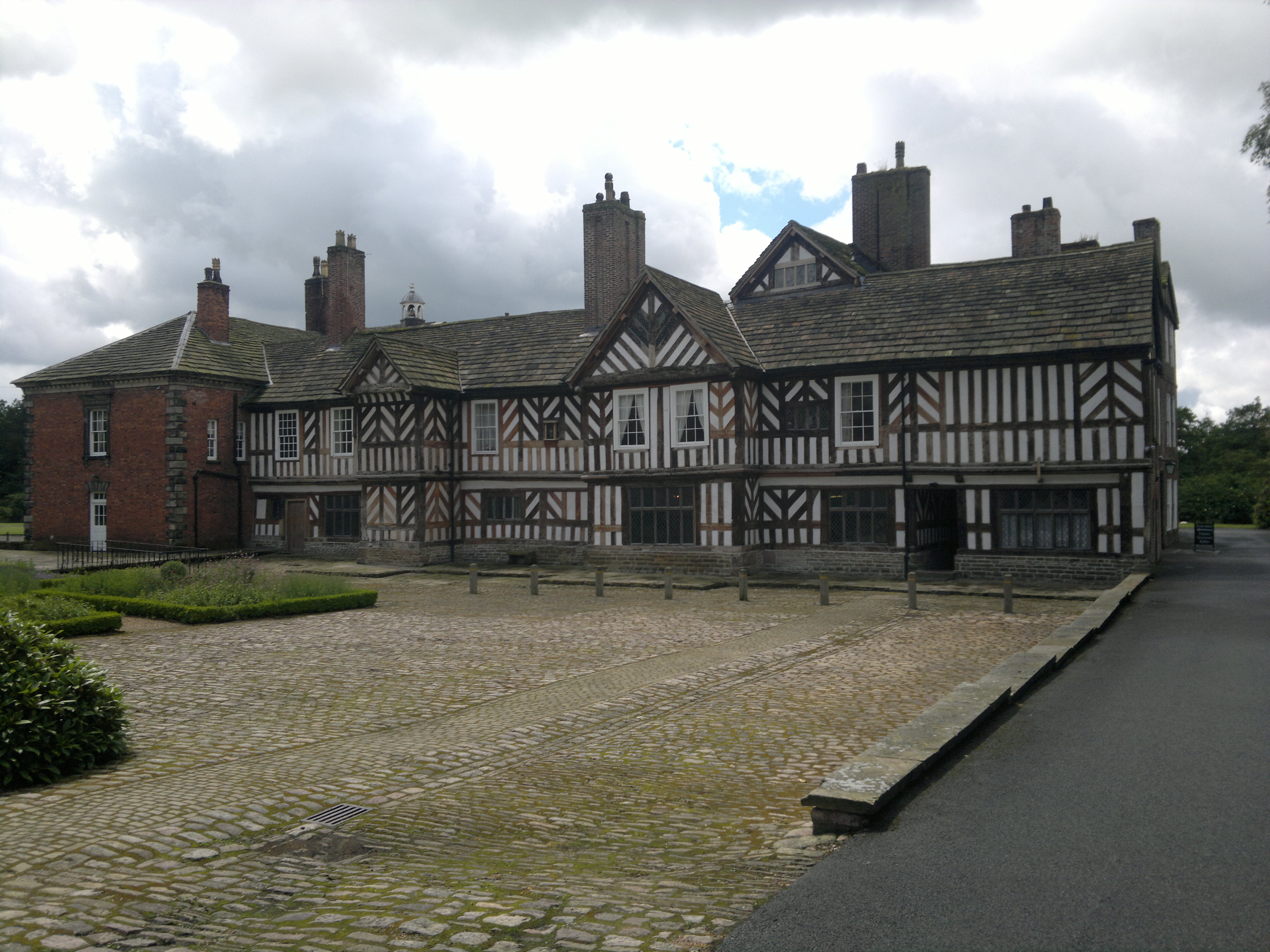
Adlington Hall, Cheshire was used for at least five episodes

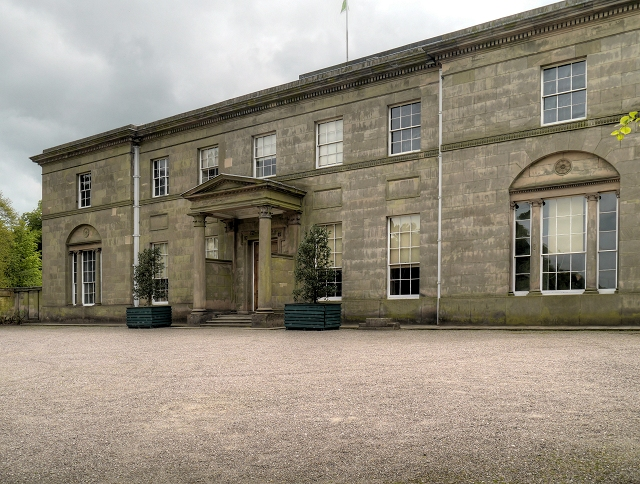
Tatton Hall, Cheshire was used for several episodes

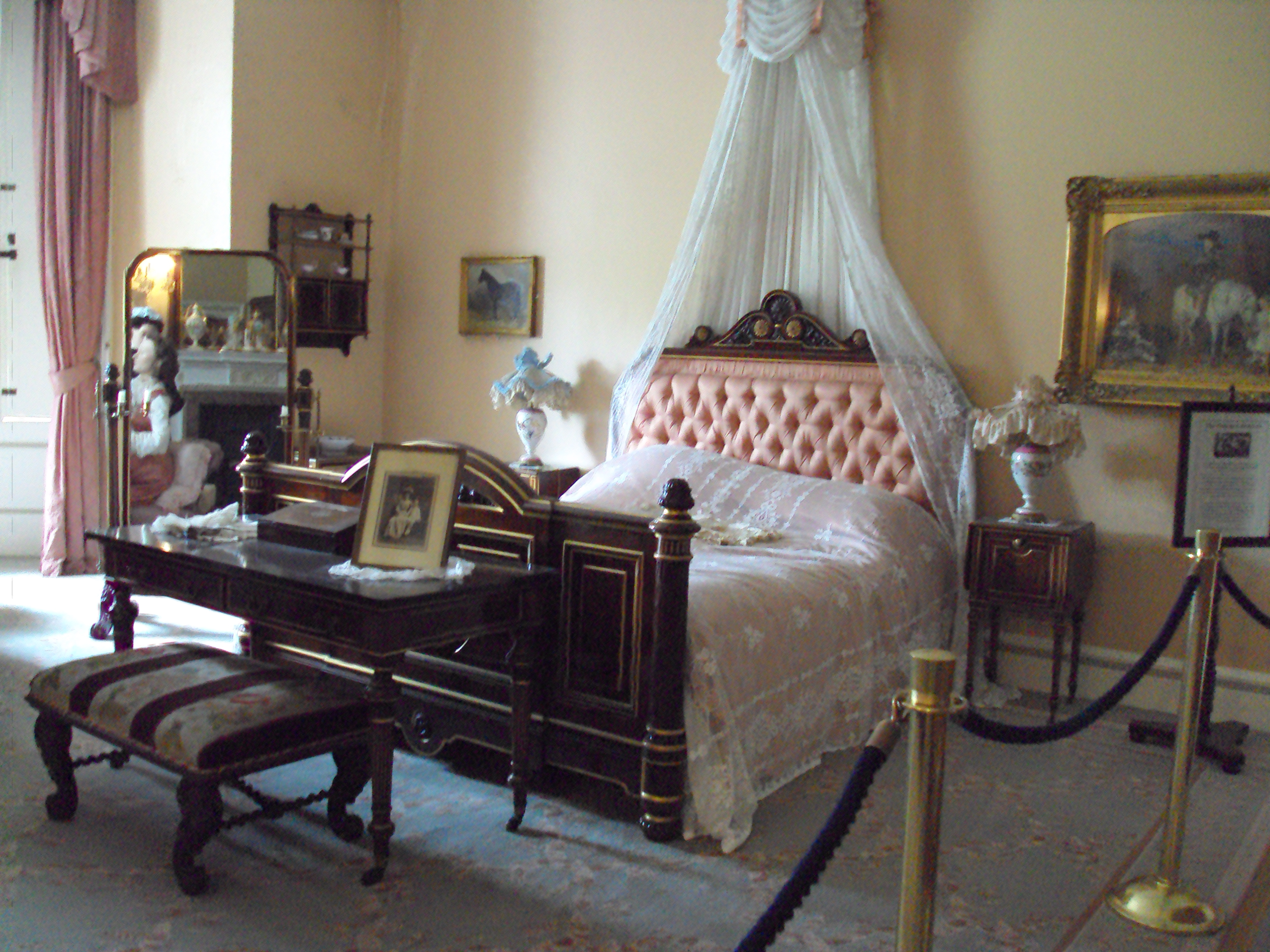
At least five episodes were filmed at Croxteth Hall, Liverpool

=== Unadapted stories ===
Though the Granada series is one of the most comprehensive screen adaptations of the Holmes canon, (Note: See the Sherlock Holmes Stoll film series (1921–1923), for which 47 of the stories were adapted.) it nevertheless left 19 stories unadapted after Brett's death. These stories comprise two of the novels and 17 of the short stories:

- A Study in Scarlet
- "A Case of Identity"
- "The Five Orange Pips"
- "The Adventure of the Engineer's Thumb"
- "The Adventure of the Beryl Coronet"
- "The Adventure of the Yellow Face"
- "The Adventure of the Stockbroker's Clerk"
- "The Adventure of the Gloria Scott"
- "The Adventure of the Reigate Squire"
- "The Adventure of Black Peter"
- "The Adventure of the Three Students"
- "The Adventure of the Missing Three-Quarter"
- The Valley of Fear
- "His Last Bow"
- "The Adventure of the Blanched Soldier"
- "The Adventure of the Three Garridebs" (The theme of this story is present in "The Mazarin Stone")
- "The Adventure of the Lion's Mane"
- "The Adventure of the Veiled Lodger" (Elements of this story are present in "The Eligible Bachelor")
- "The Adventure of the Retired Colourman"

=== Other productions ===
During 1988–1989, Brett and Hardwicke appeared in a West End play, The Secret of Sherlock Holmes, a two-hander written specially for them by the television series screenwriter Jeremy Paul.

In May 1992, Brett and Hardwicke appeared in a mini-episode (about ten minutes in length) as part of The Four Oaks Mystery, shown as part of the ITV Telethon 92 charity telethon. This episode formed the first of a four-part sequence of stories featuring the stars of four ITV detective shows of the time all separately working to solve the same mystery, broadcast at two episodes a night across one weekend. The other shows that produced mini-episodes for the special were Van der Valk, Taggart, and Inspector Wexford.

== Broadcast ==
As well as being broadcast by ITV in the UK, the series was also seen overseas, particularly in the United States, where the episodes initially ran on PBS stations in the Mystery! strand. Later series gained co-production funding from Boston PBS broadcaster WGBH. The shows have also been transmitted on two US cable television stations, Disney Channel and A&E Network, the Seven Network in Australia and on CBC in Canada.

In the UK, the series has often been repeated: on Granada Plus; on ITV3; ITV4; and on BBC Two, which ran the complete series on Saturday afternoons from 2003 to 2005. This makes it one of the very few programmes originally produced by an ITV company for broadcast on their own channel to have subsequently been shown on the BBC. In March 2006, the series returned to its original channel for the first time in over a decade, as part of the daytime television line-up on weekday afternoons.

== Reception ==
The series is considered to present the most faithful screen adaptations of many of the Holmes stories, although liberties were taken with some plotlines and characters, particularly later in the run during the 1990s episodes (for instance, "The Mazarin Stone", filmed in 1994, combined the plot elements of two separate Doyle stories).

Another change was Holmes quitting his cocaine habit in the episode "The Devil's Foot", which was done with the approval of Jean Conan Doyle, Doyle's daughter, when it was discovered that the series had a considerable child audience. In the Doyle stories, it is in "The Missing Three-Quarter", an earlier story which Granada never adapted, that Holmes quitting his habit is mentioned. Nonetheless, the series has been highly praised for the performance of Brett, its adherence to Doyle's original concept in the characterization of Watson as a young, slim, capable man of action in defiance of the stereotype set by Nigel Bruce, its high production values, and its close attention to period detail.

== Home media ==
The series has been released on DVD in Regions 1, 2 and 4, and has been repeated on ITV4 and BBC Two.

The complete series has also been released on VHS in 1991 and 1994 by MPI Home Video and on DVD, with the most recent 2005 release taking advantage of the digitally remastered film prints originally prepared for the BBC Two repeat run. In December 2012, the series was released on Blu-ray in Japan, in Spain in May 2013, in France in October 2013, and in the US in September 2014.

=== Region 1 ===
MPI Home Video has released the entire series on DVD in Region 1, in various incarnations. MPI released The Adventures & The Return in single-disc volumes as well as complete collections. The Casebook & The Memoirs were released as single-collection box sets. In addition, on 25 September 2007, a complete series set was released featuring all 41 episodes in one complete collection for the very first time.

| DVD name | Ep # | Release date |
|---|---|---|
| The Adventures of Sherlock Holmes: Boxed Set Collection | 13 | 30 April 2002 |
| The Return of Sherlock Holmes DVD Collection | 13 | 26 August 2003 |
| The Casebook of Sherlock Holmes DVD Collection | 9 | 28 September 2004 |
| The Memoirs of Sherlock Holmes DVD Collection | 6 | 26 October 2004 |
| Sherlock Holmes: The Complete Granada Television Series | 41 | 25 September 2007 |

=== Region 2 ===
ITV DVD has released the entire series in various collections as well as a complete series box set.

| DVD name | Ep # | Release date |
|---|---|---|
| Sherlock Holmes: The Adventures / The Return | 26 | 21 February 2005 |
| Sherlock Holmes: The Case Book / The Memoirs | 15 | 21 February 2005 |
| Sherlock Holmes - The Complete Collection | 41 | 21 February 2005 and 24 August 2009 |

The Complete Collection mentioned above has English subtitles only. The complete series was released on Blu-ray in Spain in 2013. Though native to Spain, the 10 disc set is region-free and thus can be played in any region of the world. The Complete Collection was released a second time on Blu-ray in Germany in 2016. It has German subtitles only but German and English soundtracks. This is a 14 disc set and is marked region 'B'.

== Bibliography ==
- Peter Haining, The Television Sherlock Holmes, W.H. Allen, London, 1986. ISBN 0-491-03055-X.
- Keith Frankel, "Granada's Greatest Detective, a Guide to the classic Sherlock Holmes television series", Fantom Publishing, Coventry England 2016. ISBN 978-1-78196-267-1.
