= Sherlock Holmes in the 22nd Century =

UK/US television series

- Title card
- Genre: Action/Adventure; Crime; Science fiction Mystery
- Created by: Sandy Ross
- Based on: Sherlock Holmes stories by Sir Arthur Conan Doyle
- Developed by: Phil Harnage
- Directed by: Paul Quinn
- Voices of: Jason Gray-Stanford; John Payne; Akiko Morison; Viv Leacock; Jennifer Copping; Richard Newman; Ian James Corlett; William Samples; Jo Bates
- Opening theme: Ron Wasserman
- Composer: Eric Allaman
- Countries of origin: United Kingdom; United States
- Original language: English
- No. of seasons: 2
- No. of episodes: 26

Production
- Executive producers: Andy Heyward; Robby London; Michael Maliani; Elizabeth Partyka
- Running time: 30 minutes (with commercials)
- Production companies: DIC Entertainment, L.P. Scottish Television Enterprises

Original release
- Network: ITV (CITV) (UK); Fox Kids (U.S., season 1); Syndication (U.S., season 2)
- Release: 6 May 1999 – 21 July 2001

Sherlock Holmes in the 22nd Century is an animated television series in which Sherlock Holmes is brought back to life in the 22nd century. The series is a co-production by DIC Entertainment, L.P. and Scottish Television Enterprises and was nominated for a Daytime Emmy for Special Class Animated Program.

== Plot ==
Set during 2103 in New London, Inspector Beth Lestrade of New Scotland Yard is chasing the grotesquely deformed French rogue geneticist Martin Fenwick, when she realizes that his companion is none other than the 19th-century criminal mastermind Professor James Moriarty. She then discovers that this is not the original Moriarty, but rather a clone created from cells taken from his corpse, which Sherlock Holmes had buried in a Swiss ice cave after Moriarty's death in 1891. Lestrade knows that Holmes died of natural causes many years later and that his corpse is preserved in a glass-walled, honey-filled coffin in the basement of New Scotland Yard. She takes the body from the basement and delivers it to biologist Sir Evan Hargreaves (who resembles Holmes' creator, Sir Arthur Conan Doyle) who has just invented a process of cellular rejuvenation. Hargreaves uses his process to return life and youth to Holmes's body so that the detective can again battle Moriarty. Holmes also returns to his old Baker Street rooms, which had been preserved as a museum. Lestrade's compudroid reads the original journals of Dr. John H. Watson and assumes his name, face, voice, and mannerisms in order to assist Holmes in both his crime-solving duties and his difficult assimilation to Great Britain in the 22nd century.

During the series, Holmes and Watson often work on retainer for New Scotland Yard, with Beth as their supervising officer and Chief Inspector Charles Grayson as hers, but they also work for private citizens. They are often assisted by the new Baker Street Irregulars: the football player Wiggins, the Cockney Deidre, and the paraplegic Tennyson, who communicates through electronic beeps (which Holmes understands after learning about 22nd-century advances in technology and Morse code). The primary villains are Moriarty and Martin Fenwick (whom Moriarty has manipulated into being his loyal henchman), appearing as they do in almost half of the produced episodes.

Each episode is inspired by one of the literary works of Sir Arthur Conan Doyle. Many of these are direct rewrites of the original stories—such as "The Adventure of the Empty House", "The Adventure of the Speckled Band", "The Five Orange Pips", "The Red-Headed League", and "The Adventure of the Engineer's Thumb"—while others are drastically different from the stories on which they are based.

Visually, the series is a blend of traditional 2D and 3D CGI animation.

== Characters ==
=== Main ===
- Sherlock Holmes (voiced by Jason Gray-Stanford) is a Great Detective who was brought back in the 22nd century to combat a memory clone of his nemesis, Professor Moriarty. Despite initial trouble with adapting to the era, he eventually acclimates quite nicely, learns to love this new era that he has been brought to, and often uses his knowledge of the future to help his allies out of death traps. Holmes has taken to playing a hand-sized keytar in place of his classic violin. He commonly uses the phrase "eyes and brain" to encourage thinking or explain his reasoning.
- Watson (voiced by John Payne) is a compudroid that initially worked as Lestrade's assistant. He later read the original Dr. John H. Watson's journals, and Lestrade unknowingly made breakthroughs in a lot of areas that day. He was able to emulate his persona from them, which led to other breakthroughs that involve a prosthetic mask that resembles Watson's face. While not able to feel emotions as a human would eventually develop and learn how, Watson can vocalize and react realistically. In public, Watson dons a cloak to better fit in. He currently resides at 221B Baker Street with Holmes.
- Inspector Beth Lestrade (voiced by Akiko Morison) is a descendant of Inspector G. Lestrade, Holmes' old ally from Scotland Yard. Often annoyed with Holmes' constant disregard for protocol, she nonetheless appreciates his continued help, despite direct orders from Grayson. Holmes likewise respects Lestrade as an extremely competent officer, more competent than her ancestor.

=== Supporting ===
- The Baker Street Irregulars are a trio of young people who assist Holmes, Watson, and Lestrade on some cases.
  - Wiggins (voiced by Viv Leacock) is the leader of the new Baker Street Irregulars. Wiggins was once a football player, but has since retired from the profession due to an injury. He has shown intelligence and reasoning skills that were enough to impress even Holmes. Wiggins is dedicated to follow Holmes' requests of the Irregulars.
  - Deidre (voiced by Jennifer Copping) is another of the Irregulars who is a fashionable young woman with a Cockney accent. In contrast to the more outlandish rest of the cast, she provides the perspective of a more typical member of New London society.
  - Tennyson is another member of the new Baker Street Irregulars who was left mute and paraplegic due to an accident where he moves around in a special hoverchair. He is an expert in the arcades and gaming, and a genius and brilliant mind on a computer and keyboard.
- Chief Inspector Charles Grayson (voiced by William Samples) is Lestrade's superior who distrusts Holmes and is reluctant of him interfering with his cases, due to him being born at a different age.
- Newscaster (voiced by Jo Bates) is an unnamed newscaster who appears on broadcasts in the episodes, which provide clues in much the same way newspapers did in the original stories.

=== Villains ===
- Professor James Moriarty (voiced by Richard Newman is the primary antagonist of the series. This Moriarty is a memory clone of the original Moriarty created by Fenwick, who hoped to use him as a brilliant servant. Moriarty was able to outwit Fenwick and reverse the roles on him, taking this new lease on life to re-create his old criminal empire, but Moriarty constantly fails, largely due to fallout of his schemes not having the same debilitating impact as in the 1800s, leaving him with nothing but setbacks.
- Martin Fenwick (voiced by Ian James Corlett) is a deformed and insane French scientist who specializes in cloning. He created a clone of Moriarty to do his bidding, but he ended up being reduced to the lackey in their relationship. Whether he does this because he knows that Moriarty could devise a horrible and painful way to dispose of him or because he has been brainwashed by Moriarty is never revealed.

== Episodes ==
The show premiered in the United Kingdom in the late spring of 1999 on CITV and then premiered that fall in the United States. In the U.S., the series was split into two seasons, with the first airing on Fox Kids, with the second planned to air on Kids' WB in 2001, but instead aired on broadcast syndication. All 26 episodes were originally planned to air in the United States on PAX (now Ion Television) alongside fellow-DIC show Archie's Weird Mysteries as part of an hour-long block, but was moved to air on Fox Kids. The two shows did, however, air together in reruns on Ion's defunct sister network Qubo from May 13, 2013 to May 26, 2018.

Only the first 13 episodes were broadcast on ITV in 1999, ending with "The Musgrave Ritual" in August. In the U.S., 17 episodes were broadcast on Fox Kids starting in September 1999, in a different order, and ending with "The Man with the Twisted Lip". The remaining episodes aired in 2001.

The series was pre-sold internationally through Buena Vista International Television.

=== Season 1 (1999–2000) ===
No.	Title	Written by	Original release date	U.S. airdate	Based on
1	"The Fall and Rise of Sherlock Holmes"	Phil Harnage	6 May 1999	18 September 1999	"The Final Problem"
In 1891, Sherlock Holmes battles his nemesis Professor Moriarty over the Reichenbach Falls, leading to their supposed deaths after they fall off the bridge. In May 2103, Beth Lestrade, descendant of Inspector G. Lestrade, Holmes' old ally from Scotland Yard, notices deranged French scientist Martin Fenwick making a getaway with a man who looks exactly like Moriarty. Unable to convince her boss, Chief Inspector Charles Grayson, of the possibility of Moriarty somehow returning from the dead, she breaks into the New Scotland Yard basement, where the body of Holmes had been preserved in honey; the detective had survived the fall and later retired, becoming a beekeeper in his later years. She takes his body to a biologist named Sir Evan Hargreaves who has developed a process of cellular regeneration, which restores Holmes' youth and revives him. Lestrade gives Holmes some educational videos to bring him up to speed on the advancements in the world since his era. She also has her compudroid Watson read Dr. Watson's journals to learn how to better assist Holmes, with the compudroid emulating Watson's persona.
2	"The Crime Machine"	Martha Moran	13 May 1999	25 September 1999	The Valley of Fear
Holmes leads Lestrade to an ice cave, where Moriarty's body is preserved in ice, but they set off a trap that seals off the cave, leaving them unable to investigate further. In the meantime, citizens that have normally shown no criminal intent have suddenly begun stealing different pieces of technology without even knowing why. Holmes takes interest in the case, meeting a trio of children, whom he makes his new Baker Street Irregulars. With their help, Holmes finds that Fenwick is using a device to turn citizens into criminals to steal things that he needs. They destroy the machine, along with a portion of the old railroad. During the fight, Holmes comes to accept the robot Watson as his new companion. Later, Holmes moves back into his old lodgings and Watson gets an upgrade, receiving a prosthetic mask that mimics the original Dr. Watson's face.
3	"The Hounds of the Baskervilles"	Martha Moran	20 May 1999	2 October 1999	The Hound of the Baskervilles
A trio of children on a field trip to a Moon base vanish. Along with this are sightings of a demonic dog on the Moon, simply called the Hound. Holmes investigates, learning that the Hound is simply a hologram based on old superstitions. The case of the missing children leads to the discovery that Moriarty had kidnapped a child to lure her father to the Moon base, so he could gain access codes to blow it up. During their confrontation, Holmes reveals that this Moriarty is a clone created by Fenwick (he had found a small drilled hole in the ice leading to Moriarty's hand in the previous episode), who intended to use the clone as his brilliant slave, but Moriarty had outwitted Fenwick and become his master. Holmes manages to shut down the reactor, while revealing that he had Watson remotely reprogram Moriarty's getaway vehicle to go to the Yard, but upon reaching Earth, Moriarty managed to escape before the Yard could capture him.
4	"The Adventure of the Empty House"	Marv Wolfman	27 June 1999	9 October 1999	"The Adventure of the Empty House"
In July 2103, Holmes and Moriarty are apparently vaporized after falling into a laser grid. Watson and Lestrade investigate the case of Ronald Adair, a competitor in a laser-shooting tournament who was found frozen solid. He was frozen by a shooter with a ranged freezing weapon. It is revealed that Holmes and Moriarty survived, and the same shooter is after Holmes.
5	"The Crooked Man"	Terence Taylor and Eleanor Burian-Mohr	20 June 1999	15 October 1999	"The Crooked Man"
An argument is overheard between James Barclay and his wife Nancy. Mr. Barclay disappears and Mrs. Barclay is found unconscious. Holmes and Watson interview Mrs. Barclay's friend while Lestrade looks into Mr. Barclay's company, Biotech. The case also involves Victor Morris, who was genetically altered as the result of a sabotaged experiment.
6	"The Adventure of the Deranged Detective"	Henry Gilroy	4 July 1999	23 October 1999	"The Adventure of the Dying Detective"
Holmes and Watson investigate after Lestrade suddenly becomes mindlessly aggressive during the investigation of a nanotechnology theft. The neurosurgeon Culverton Smith says she has had a mental breakdown, but Holmes is sceptical. Holmes soon appears to have a breakdown himself.
7	"The Adventure of the Sussex Vampire Lot"	Phil Harnage	25 July 1999	30 October 1999	"The Adventure of the Sussex Vampire"
Lestrade asks Holmes and Watson to help investigate a vampire that has been seen draining data from government and bank computers. Lestrade gets annoyed when the Boston Street Irregulars are involved in the case. Having heard about the vampire sightings, Moriarty intends to recruit the vampire as an ally. Both parties trace the vampire to a hidden lair in New London's sewers. Thanks to a tactic from Sherlock, Moriarty and Fenwick get away. The vampire is revealed to be a hacker named Amanda Wheelwright who was using a holographic avatar disguise based on the old vampire movies and was also restoring the data to keep it from falling into Moriarty's hands. Holmes persuades Lestrade not to arrest Wheelwright and to have her do community service instead. Wheelwright asks Holmes to make sure Moriarty does not come after her again.
8	"The Scales of Justice"	Ken Pontac	4 June 1999	6 November 1999	"The Adventure of the Speckled Band"
On August 12, 2103, a bio-chip theft occurs at a biotechnology company called GenieTech. Holmes finds an odd snake scale with hair on it at the scene. This leads him to New London's local herpetologist Dr. Grimesby Roylott at the local zoo who may have been involved in the incident as they also meet his daughter Dr. Helen Roylott and her pet python Monty. Grimesby identifies the scale and points Holmes and Watson to his old college Thornus Chapman, who has been creating biological Chimeras. When they arrive at Chapman's "mythical museum", Holmes and Watson are attacked by a genetic Griffin, a genetic Cerberus, and a gorilla/lion/scorpion hybrid named Agnes. Chapman calls off the hybrids and explains to Holmes and Watson that Grimesby was in the same Earth Sentinel Group as him. They had a falling out when it came to breeding new species to replace the ones that were lost. It is later learned that Grimesby was behind the theft and gave himself the ability to transform into a python hybrid. Holmes knocks himself and Grimesby into the penguin exhibit's waters, which knocks Grimesby out.
9	"The Resident Patient"	Robert Askin	27 May 1999	13 November 1999	"The Resident Patient"
Fenwick and Moriarty's other henchmen assume disguises, using technology invented by Dr. Blessington to make their DNA unrecognizable.
10	"The Sign of Four"	Phil Harnage	18 July 1999	20 November 1999	The Sign of the Four
Holmes and Watson accompany their latest client Mary Morstan to the Moon where she has been asked to meet someone named Thad Sholto.
11	"The Adventure of the Dancing Men"	Terence Taylor and Eleanor Burian-Mohr	11 June 1999	27 November 1999	"The Adventure of the Dancing Men"
A married couple, Hilton and Elsie Cubitt, are found unconscious. One of the clues about what happened to them is an email with a code in the form of a cartoon.
12	"The Musgrave Ritual"	Robert Askin	1 August 1999	4 December 1999	"The Musgrave Ritual"
Fenwick steals the Musgrave Sword, which has a cryptic ritual inscribed on it, from the British Museum. Holmes investigates and deciphers the ritual using a replica of the sword.
13	"The Adventure of the Blue Carbuncle"	Seth Kearsley	TBA	11 December 1999	"The Adventure of the Blue Carbuncle"
The Blue Carbuncle is a popular toy on sale during the Christmas season, but the last one to be sold is more of a collector's item than even the buyer thought.
14	"Silver Blaze"	Robert Askin	11 July 1999	31 January 2000	"Silver Blaze"
Holmes investigates the disappearance of Silver Blaze, a racing spacecraft which is supposed to be piloted by John Straker in the upcoming Asteroid Belt Grand Prix.
15	"The Five Orange Pips"	Greg Johnson	TBA	7 February 2000	"The Five Orange Pips"
Joseph Openshaw, an "anti-tech" who dislikes modern technology, is startled when he receives five orange seeds and is apparently poisoned. He sends his young son John to bring Holmes to him. Holmes insists on bringing Watson along despite objections from John and John's Uncle Elias who also dislikes modern technology.
16	"The Red-Headed League"	Martha Moran	TBA	14 February 2000	"The Red-Headed League"
A restaurant owner named Carter Wilson is chosen to join the Red-Headed League, an exclusive society of red-headed men. Holmes is intrigued and investigates the League.
17	"The Man with the Twisted Lip"	Greg Johnson	TBA	21 February 2000	"The Man with the Twisted Lip"
Lois St. Clair asks Holmes to find her husband Neville. The investigation leads to a panhandler with a twisted lip.

=== Season 2 (2001) ===
No.	Title	Written by	Original release date	U.S. airdate	Based on
S2–1	"The Secret Safe"	Reed Shelly and Bruce Shelly	TBA	31 March 2001	"His Last Bow"
A burglary occurs at 10 Downing Street. It appears that only an African doll was taken, though Holmes suspects that the security system plans in a hidden safe were copied. A reclusive man called Lord Bork appears to be involved.
S2–2	"The Adventure of the Second Stain"	Reed Shelly and Bruce Shelly	TBA	21 April 2001	"The Adventure of the Second Stain"
A holo-disc containing a security code is stolen from an intelligence agent named Mark Trenton. Holmes is brought in by the intelligence agency to find the disc. Trenton's wife and another agent named Edward Lucas appear to be connected to the case.
S2–3	"The Adventure of the Engineer's Thumb"	Ken Pontac	TBA	28 April 2001	"The Adventure of the Engineer's Thumb"
A blood regenerating device is stolen from the safe of a scientist named Victor Hatherley, whose thumbprint is needed to open the safe.
S2–4	"The Gloria Scott"	Woody Creek	TBA	12 May 2001	"The Gloria Scott"
Victor Trevor comes to Holmes believing his father is being blackmailed by a man named Hudson. Victor found a cryptic message in his father's papers which contains the words Gloria and Scott. Following the clues, Holmes discovers that Mr. Trevor was once (falsely) convicted and transported on a prison shuttle, the Riley (the ship's full name was the Gloria Scott Riley). A fellow prisoner, however, started a riot on the spaceship and left it adrift in space while he and the other prisoners fled to Earth and started new lives.
S2–5	"The Adventure of the Six Napoleons"	Martha Moran	TBA	19 May 2001	"The Adventure of the Six Napoleons"
One of the last six Napoleon Excelsior cars ever built is vandalized, though nothing is taken and only the decorative crystals on the luxury car are damaged. Another of the cars is also vandalized in the same manner. Holmes believes that there is something deeper about these incidents, perhaps going back to the manufacturing.
S2–6	"The Adventure of the Creeping Man"	Ken Pontac	TBA	26 May 2001	"The Adventure of the Creeping Man"
Alice, Lestrade's friend from college, is engaged to Professor Jacob Presbury. Holmes investigates after a strange gorilla-like creature appears at Alice's window. Meanwhile, Edith, Lestrade's other friend from college, is Professor Presbury's daughter and believes Alice is after her inheritance as Holmes, Watson, and Lestrade also meet Presbury's assistant Trevor Bennett. On Presbury's wedding day, Holmes learns that Presbury was transformed into his gorilla-like form by Bennett, who was in love with Alice. When the gazebo collapses during the fight with Alice underneath it, Presbury saves Alice before reverting to his human form as Lestrade arrests Trevor. Later that night, Professor Presbury is told that Bennett stumbled upon the transformation process and wanted to drive Alice away from Presbury. Lestrade decides to have Trevor evaluated and asks if they have a wedding to finish.
S2–7	"The Adventure of the Beryl Board"	Terence Taylor and Eleanor Burian-Mohr	TBA	23 June 2001	"The Adventure of the Beryl Coronet"
The Beryl Board, a new processor, was stolen from the home of Alexander Holder, where Holder was keeping the board as collateral for a loan. Holder's son was caught with a piece of the board and arrested for the theft, but Holmes believes he may be innocent.
S2–8	"The Adventure of the Mazarin Chip"	Gildart Jackson	TBA	30 June 2001	"The Adventure of the Mazarin Stone"
Moriarty and Fenwick steal the Mazarin Chip, a microchip which can be used to create virtual environments instantly, and kidnap the Prime Minister. Holmes uses a waxwork likeness of himself to catch Moriarty in a trap.
S2–9	"A Case of Identity"	Robert Askin	TBA	21 July 2001	"A Case of Identity"
Lestrade is told she must work with a rookie partner, Constable Abner Angel. Holmes searches for a jewel thief named Linus Beaumont who escaped after being caught by New Scotland Yard.

== Voice cast ==
- Jason Gray-Stanford as Sherlock Holmes
- John Payne as Watson
- Akiko Morison as Inspector Beth Lestrade
- Viv Leacock as Wiggins
- Jennifer Copping as Deidre
- Richard Newman as Professor James Moriarty
- Ian James Corlett as Martin Fenwick
- William Samples as Chief Inspector Charles Grayson
- Jo Bates as Newscaster

=== Additional voice cast ===
- Sharon Alexander
- Gillian Barber
- Kathleen Barr
- Lisa Ann Beley
- Sudsy Clarke
- Bernard Cuffling
- Michael Dobson
- Paul Dobson
- Erin Fitzgerald
- Vince Gale
- Merrilyn Gann
- Christopher Gaze
- Mackenzie Gray as Elias Openshaw (in "The Five Orange Pips")
- Jeff Gulka
- Phil Hayes
- Adam Henderson
- Saffron Henderson
- Terry Klassen
- Campbell Lane
- Blu Mankuma
- Cusse Mankuma
- Scott McNeil as John Straker (in "Silver Blaze")
- Maxine Miller
- Lachlan Murdoch as John Openshaw (in "The Five Orange Pips")
- Jane Perry
- Tamara Phillips
- Gerald Plunkett as Colonel Ross (in "Silver Blaze")
- Laara Sadiq
- Alvin Sanders
- Malcolm Stewart
- Simon Webb
- Peter Wilds
- Kevin T. Williams
- Dale Wilson

== Development ==
The series was conceptualized by Sandy Ross, a Scottish Television executive, while skiing in Aspen, Colorado in January 1996. DIC Productions and Scottish Television, who had previously collaborated on other series, produced the show. Some issues were raised about language carrying different connotations between cultures, but alternative action and dialogue were used to overcome this. The series was originally planned to be called Sherlock Holmes in the 21st Century, but as the planned air date of September 1998 was near the new century, the show's name was changed.

Les Studios Tex was also confirmed to be working on the series, although they are not credited in the final product.

== Home media ==
=== United Kingdom ===
A VHS tape of the series containing the first six episodes (in production order) was released in the United Kingdom by Universal Pictures Video under their Vision Video Ltd. division on September 24, 1999.

To date, the series has not seen a DVD release in the country.

=== United States ===
In 2002, Lions Gate Home Entertainment and Trimark Home Video released Sherlock Holmes in the 22nd Century: The Fall and Rise of Sherlock Holmes to VHS and DVD. This release also consisted of the first three episodes in a feature-length format. The episode "The Sign of Four" was also included on the DVD version.

In 2003, Sterling Entertainment Group released Sherlock Holmes in the 22nd Century: Out of This World to VHS and DVD. The release contained the episodes "The Sign of Four", "The Adventures of the Dancing Men", and "Silver Blaze", with the episode "The Gloria Scott" as a bonus episode.

In February 2012, Mill Creek Entertainment released Sherlock Holmes in the 22nd Century... On the Case on DVD in the US, consisting of the first 10 episodes of the series, and also containing an episode of Stargate Infinity. They also released a DVD box set called Sherlock Holmes in the 22nd Century: The Complete 26-Episode Series, containing all 26 episodes alongside five bonus episodes from other Cookie Jar-owned series.

Mill Creek re-released the complete series on DVD in Region 1 as Sherlock Holmes in the 22nd Century: The Complete Series in April 2018. This version also came with a digital download code.

Topaz Distribution released a 25th Anniversary Edition DVD set on March 7, 2025.
