= The Adventure of the Noble Bachelor =

Short story by Arthur Conan Doyle featuring Sherlock Holmes

- Short story by Arthur Conan Doyle
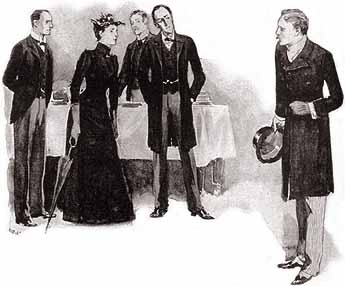
- Lord St. Simon finds out the truth, 1892 illustration by Sidney Paget

Text available at Wikisource
- Country: United Kingdom
- Language: English
- Genre: Detective fiction short stories

Publication
- Published in: Strand Magazine
- Publication date: April 1892

Chronology
- Series: The Adventures of Sherlock Holmes
The Adventure of the Engineer's Thumb	The Adventure of the Beryl Coronet

"The Adventure of the Noble Bachelor", one of the 56 short Sherlock Holmes stories written by Sir Arthur Conan Doyle, is the tenth of the twelve stories collected in The Adventures of Sherlock Holmes. The story was first published in The Strand Magazine in April 1892.

== Plot ==
Lord Robert St. Simon comes to Sherlock Holmes and Dr Watson for help after his bride, Hatty Doran, disappeared during their wedding reception. He explains that the dollar princess—heiress to a large California mining fortune—traveled to Britain, eager to marry him after they met in San Francisco. However, Hatty became uncharacteristically sharp with St. Simon following the wedding, during which she had dropped her bouquet and a gentleman in the front row returned it to her. During the post-wedding breakfast at St. Simon's father-in-law's home, Hatty spoke with her maid before claiming "a sudden indisposition" and retired to her room. Not long after, she is discovered to have disappeared. Additionally, her wedding dress and ring were found washed ashore at the Serpentine, leading Inspector Lestrade of Scotland Yard to drag the river for Hatty's body.

Despite Lestrade and Watson's confusion, Holmes easily deduces what happened, having dealt with similar cases before. Upon locating Hatty, he forces her to reveal to St. Simon that the mystery man, Francis H. Moulton, was her previous husband. Years prior, following their own wedding, Moulton had left to become a prospector. After he was reported killed following an Apache raid on the mining camp he worked at, Hatty assumed it was true and eventually met St. Simon even though she was still in love with Moulton. Meanwhile, Moulton was captured by the Apache, but escaped and followed Hatty to London to reunite with her. She recognised him instantly, though he gestured her to stay silent to avoid causing a scandal and secretly passed a note to her while returning her bouquet. She subsequently faked her death to be with Moulton again. Holmes convinces Hatty to be more honest and apologize to St. Simon. However, he refuses to accept, feeling that he had been ill used.

== Publication history ==
"The Adventure of the Noble Bachelor" was first published in the UK in The Strand Magazine in April 1892, and in the United States in the US edition of the Strand in May 1892. The story was published with eight illustrations by Sidney Paget in The Strand Magazine. It was included in the short story collection The Adventures of Sherlock Holmes, which was published in October 1892.

== Adaptations ==
=== Film and television ===
The story was adapted as a silent short film released in 1921 as part of the Stoll film series starring Eille Norwood as Holmes.

The Granada Sherlock Holmes television series adapted the story in 1993 as a feature-length television film entitled The Eligible Bachelor. The film makes significant changes and the inclusion of elements from other parts of the Holmes canon. It features Jeremy Brett as Sherlock Holmes, Edward Hardwicke as Dr. Watson and Simon Williams as Robert, Lord St. Simon.

The 2018 HBO Asia/Hulu Japan series Miss Sherlock loosely adapts this story as the episode "The Missing Bride." In this version, the solution to the original story is revealed to be a red herring, and the bride's true motive for disappearing is quite different.

=== Audio ===
Edith Meiser adapted the story as an episode of the radio series The Adventures of Sherlock Holmes. The episode, titled "The Noble Bachelor", aired on 22 December 1930, starring Richard Gordon as Sherlock Holmes and Leigh Lovell as Dr. Watson. A repeat broadcast of the episode aired in 1933, and a remake aired in July 1936 (with Gordon as Holmes and Harry West as Watson).

Edith Meiser also adapted the story as an episode of the radio series The New Adventures of Sherlock Holmes, with Basil Rathbone as Holmes and Nigel Bruce as Watson, that aired on 13 October 1940. A 1943 episode titled "A Sword That Beheaded Three Queens" was referred to by some newspapers as "The Noble Bachelor's Second Wedding", which may indicate that the episode was inspired by "The Adventure of the Noble Bachelor".

A radio adaptation of the story aired on the BBC Light Programme in 1959, as part of the 1952–1969 radio series starring Carleton Hobbs as Holmes and Norman Shelley as Watson. It was adapted by Michael Hardwick.

"The Noble Bachelor" was dramatised for BBC Radio 4 in 1991 by Bert Coules, as an episode of the 1989–1998 radio series starring Clive Merrison as Holmes and Michael Williams as Watson. It featured Donald Gee as Inspector Lestrade.

The story was adapted as an episode of the radio series The Classic Adventures of Sherlock Holmes, starring John Patrick Lowrie as Holmes and Lawrence Albert as Watson. The episode aired in 2015.

In 2023, the podcast Sherlock & Co. adapted the story in a two-episode adventure called "The Noble Bachelor", starring Harry Attwell as Sherlock Holmes, Paul Waggott as Dr. John Watson and Marta da Silva as Mariana "Mrs. Hudson" Ametxazurra.
