= The Adventure of the Engineer's Thumb =

Short story by Arthur Conan Doyle featuring Sherlock Holmes

- Short story by Arthur Conan Doyle
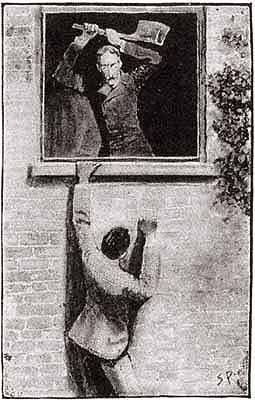
- Hatherley loses his thumb whilst attempting his escape, 1892 illustration by Sidney Paget.

Text available at Wikisource
- Country: United Kingdom
- Language: English
- Genre: Detective fiction short stories

Publication
- Published in: Strand Magazine
- Publication date: March 1892

Chronology
- Series: The Adventures of Sherlock Holmes
The Adventure of the Speckled Band	The Adventure of the Noble Bachelor

"The Adventure of the Engineer's Thumb," one of the 56 short Sherlock Holmes stories written by Sir Arthur Conan Doyle, is the ninth of the twelve stories collected in The Adventures of Sherlock Holmes. The story was first published in The Strand Magazine in March 1892. Within the narrative of the story, Dr. Watson notes that this is one of only two cases which he personally brought to the attention of Sherlock Holmes.

== Plot ==
In the summer of 1889, a young Londoner and consultant hydraulic engineer, Victor Hatherley, is brought to Dr. Watson's home one morning to receive medical attention for a severed thumb he sustained the previous night. Once Watson has tended to the wound, he takes Hatherley to see Sherlock Holmes so the latter can hear the details of the night's events.

Hatherley was visited by a man who identified himself as Colonel Lysander Stark and offered to pay him 50 guineas (£52.50, equivalent to £5,833 in 2025) to examine a hydraulic press at a country house in Eyford, Berkshire that Stark claimed was used to compress fuller's earth into bricks. Despite his misgivings and doubts about the machine's true purpose, Hatherley felt compelled to accept the offer, as his business was newly established and he had little work.

Upon arriving at an appointed train station, Hatherley was picked up by Stark in a carriage with frosted glass windows. They traveled what seemed to be a considerable distance, estimated by Hatherley to be 12 miles. After they arrived at the house, a woman warned Hatherley to leave, but he disregarded her. Stark and a man introduced as Ferguson took Hatherley to the hydraulic press. Hatherley made recommendations on how to fix it, but did not believe it was being used to compress fuller's earth, as the engine was far too powerful for such a purpose. Closer examination confirmed that the device was used to process metal. He confronted Stark, who then tried to kill him with the press. After the woman helped Hatherley escape, making a reference to a "last time", a murderous Stark pursued him with a cleaver. Hatherley climbed out a second-storey window and hung on to the sill, preparing to drop to the ground, but instead fell when Stark severed his thumb. Surviving the fall, Hatherley passed out while fleeing among the rosebushes and later awoke by a hedge near the train station.

Once Hatherley finishes his story, Holmes deduces that Stark and his allies are counterfeiters, and their machine was used to mint false coins. The police confirm that a gang has been producing half crowns in large amounts, but could not be tracked until now. From Hatherley's account of Stark's carriage horse being fresh and well-groomed, Holmes concludes that the criminals are located near the station, and that the 12-mile drive with frosted glass windows was intended to disguise their location. Checking the newspapers helps identify the "last time" the woman spoke about; a hydraulic engineer left his lodgings a year prior, and has never been seen since. Holmes, Watson, and the police travel to the house Hatherley described, only to find it ablaze due to Hatherley's oil lamp being crushed by the press. Their operation ruined, the counterfeiters fled in the direction of Reading, Berkshire, taking several large boxes that Holmes believes may have held their coins.

Hatherley laments the loss of both his thumb and the 50 guineas, but Holmes reassures him that he has gained a compelling story that he can tell for the rest of his life.

== Publication information ==
"The Adventure of the Engineer's Thumb" was first published in the UK in The Strand Magazine in March 1892, and in the United States in the US edition of the Strand in April 1892. The story was published with eight illustrations by Sidney Paget in The Strand Magazine. It was included in the short story collection The Adventures of Sherlock Holmes, which was published in October 1892.

== Adaptations ==
=== Film and television ===
A silent short film adaptation was released in 1923 as part of the Stoll film series starring Eille Norwood as Holmes.

The story was adapted for an episode of the 1954–1955 television series Sherlock Holmes starring Ronald Howard as Holmes and Howard Marion Crawford as Watson. The episode was titled "The Case of the Shoeless Engineer" and the story was altered so that Hatherley loses a shoe rather than his thumb, and Stark and his co-conspirator are captured by Lestrade with the assistance of Holmes.

The story was additionally adapted for the TMS Entertainment anime series Sherlock Hound, specifically in the Hayao Miyazaki-directed episode "A Small Client" (1984). The general gist of the story was retained, albeit with several notable changes such as Stark being replaced by Professor Moriarty and the case being brought to Holmes' attention by the engineer's young daughter (as the engineer himself remains a prisoner for the majority of the episode). The original story's violence is also toned down for the series' young audience: for instance, Moriarty only briefly threatens the hanging engineer with a hatchet before being disarmed by Holmes.

The story was also adapted in the 1986 Soviet TV movie The Adventures of Sherlock Holmes and Dr. Watson – The Twentieth Century Approaches. There, the criminal (Col. Stark) is Eduardo Lucas from "The Adventure of the Second Stain", and the gang's work is economic sabotage by the German Empire. Upon hearing the details, Mycroft Holmes decides to balance the damage by producing an equal amount of counterfeit German currency.

An episode of the animated television series Sherlock Holmes in the 22nd Century was based on the story. The episode, also titled "The Adventure of the Engineer's Thumb", aired in 2001.

=== Audio ===
Edith Meiser adapted the story as an episode of the radio series The Adventures of Sherlock Holmes, which aired on 17 December 1931, starring Richard Gordon as Sherlock Holmes and Leigh Lovell as Dr. Watson. Another episode adapted from the story aired on 24 February 1935 (with Louis Hector as Holmes and Lovell as Watson).

Edith Meiser also adapted the story as an episode of the radio series The New Adventures of Sherlock Holmes, with Basil Rathbone as Holmes and Nigel Bruce as Watson, that aired on 20 October 1940. Other episodes in the same series that were adapted from the story aired in June 1943 and January 1948 (with John Stanley as Holmes and Alfred Shirley as Watson).

A radio adaptation aired on the BBC Light Programme in 1960, as part of the 1952–1969 radio series starring Carleton Hobbs as Holmes and Norman Shelley as Watson. It was adapted by Michael Hardwick.

"The Engineer's Thumb" was dramatized by Peter Mackie for BBC Radio 4 in 1991, as part of the 1989–1998 radio series starring Clive Merrison as Holmes and Michael Williams as Watson. It featured John Moffatt as Lysander Stark.

The story was adapted as an episode of the radio series The Classic Adventures of Sherlock Holmes, starring John Patrick Lowrie as Holmes and Lawrence Albert as Watson. The episode aired in 2015.

In 2026, the podcast Sherlock & Co. adapted the story in a three-episode adventure called "The Engineer's Thumb", starring Harry Attwell as Sherlock Holmes, Paul Waggott as Dr. John Watson and Marta da Silva as Mariana "Mrs. Hudson" Ametxazurra. The story is adapted to take place at an abandoned theme park, the role of Hatherley is replaced by a Vicky, played by Shin-Fei Chen. The first episode of the adventure adapted The Madness of Colonel Warburton which is an untold case mentioned by Watson in the first paragraph of The Adventure of the Engineer's Thumb
