= A Case of Identity =

Short story by Arthur Conan Doyle featuring Sherlock Holmes

- Short story by Arthur Conan Doyle
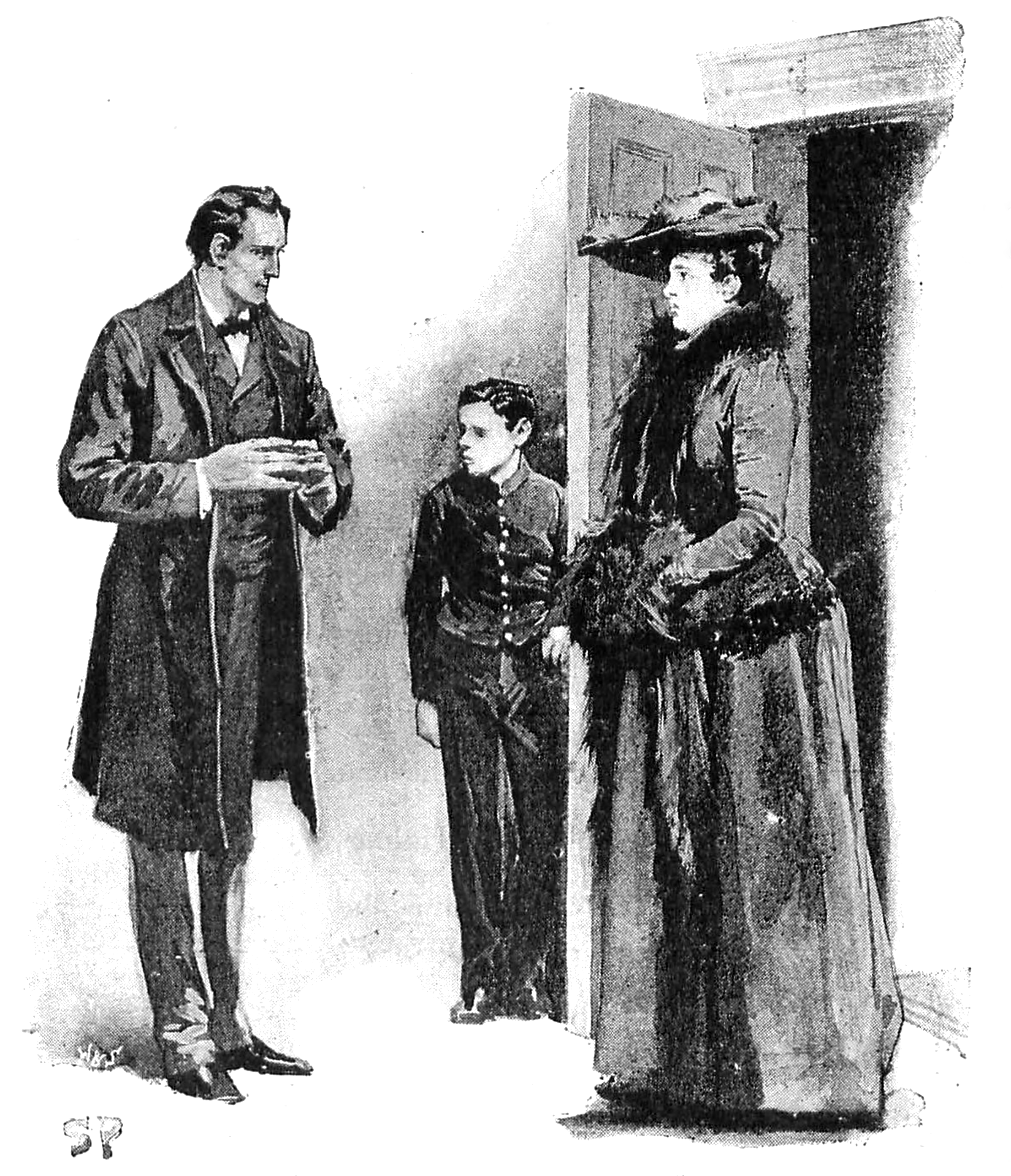
- Holmes welcoming Miss Mary, 1891 illustration by Sidney Paget

Text available at Wikisource
- Country: United Kingdom
- Language: English
- Genre: Detective fiction short stories

Publication
- Published in: Strand Magazine
- Publication date: September 1891

Chronology
- Series: The Adventures of Sherlock Holmes
The Red-Headed League	The Boscombe Valley Mystery

"A Case of Identity" is one of the 56 short Sherlock Holmes stories written by Sir Arthur Conan Doyle. It was first published in The Strand Magazine in September 1891, later appearing in The Adventures of Sherlock Holmes.

== Plot ==
Mary Sutherland, a working-class girl who possesses a generous income as a result of a bequest from a relative, comes to Sherlock Holmes and Dr. Watson for help after her fiancé, Hosmer Angel, disappears on their wedding day. Angel, Holmes learns, was a quiet and secretive man who wore a pair of tinted glasses, had a thick beard and moustache, and would not give Sutherland his address, insisting that she leave letters at the local post office instead. He would only meet her when her disapproving stepfather, James Windibank, was out of the country on business.

Holmes easily deduces that Windibank and Angel are the same person. Windibank knew that he could only benefit from his stepdaughter's income while she remained unmarried, and so he hatched a plan to keep her single indefinitely. As "Hosmer Angel", he successfully sought her hand; he then engineered Angel's disappearance before the marriage could take place. As he had hoped, Sutherland remained loyal to her lost fiancé, saying she could never love another. Holmes confirms his theory by comparing Angel's letters to a missive from Windibank. Various small defects in the type indicate that they came from the same typewriter.

Windibank boasts to Holmes that he has broken no laws, but flees when Holmes threatens to beat him with a riding crop. Holmes chooses not to divulge his findings to Sutherland, knowing she will not believe him anyway. He advises her to forget about Angel, though his words have little effect on her. As for Windibank, Holmes predicts that his wicked ways will eventually lead him to the gallows.

== Publication history ==
"A Case of Identity" was first published in the UK in The Strand Magazine in September 1891, appearing in the US edition of The Strand the following month. The story was published with seven illustrations by Sidney Paget. It was later included in the short story collection The Adventures of Sherlock Holmes, published in October 1892.

== Adaptations ==
=== Film and television ===
This story was the basis for the third Holmes adventure (released in 1921) in the silent Stoll film series, starring Eille Norwood.

In 2001, the story was the basis for the last episode of the animated television series Sherlock Holmes in the 22nd Century.

In 2014, it is seen in "The Empty Hearse", from the BBC television series Sherlock, as one of the cases Sherlock works on with Molly Hooper assisting him. Mary Sutherland was portrayed by Elizabeth Coyle. Molly Hooper was portrayed by Louise Brealey.

In the fourth episode of the 2014 Japanese puppetry television series Sherlock Holmes, Mary Sutherland is a pupil of Beeton School. She is in love with the senior Hosmer Angel who suddenly disappears in a cave at the back of the school. Holmes, a pupil who lives in room 221B of Baker Dormitory, suspects that Angel and Windibank, one of the childhood friends of Sutherland, are the same person and he and Watson find out that there is no pupil called Hosmer Angel in the school. Holmes appreciates Watson for consoling the broken-hearted Sutherland. Watson tells Holmes, who criticises novels as in the original story, that he is wrong to do so because various things can be learned from novels including how to understand the female mind.

=== Audio ===
Edith Meiser adapted the story as an episode of the radio series The Adventures of Sherlock Holmes, which aired on 5 May 1932, starring Richard Gordon as Sherlock Holmes and Leigh Lovell as Dr. Watson. Another episode adapted from the story aired on 21 April 1935 (with Louis Hector as Holmes and Lovell as Watson).

Edith Meiser also adapted the story for the radio series The New Adventures of Sherlock Holmes, with Basil Rathbone as Holmes and Nigel Bruce as Watson. The episode aired on 30 November 1941. Another adaptation of the story aired in the same series on 30 May 1948 (with John Stanley as Holmes and Alfred Shirley as Watson).

John Gielgud played Sherlock Holmes and Ralph Richardson played Dr. Watson in a radio adaptation that aired on the BBC Light Programme on 2 November 1954. It was broadcast on NBC radio on 23 January 1955.

A radio adaptation aired in 1969, as part of the 1952–1969 BBC radio series, starring Carleton Hobbs as Holmes and Norman Shelley as Watson. It was adapted by Michael Hardwick.

The story was adapted in 1990 by Peter Mackie as an episode of the 1989–1998 BBC radio series, starring Clive Merrison as Holmes and Michael Williams as Watson, and featuring Susannah Corbett as Mary Sutherland.

A 2014 episode of the radio series The Classic Adventures of Sherlock Holmes was adapted from the story, with John Patrick Lowrie as Holmes and Lawrence Albert as Watson.

In 2024, the podcast Sherlock & Co. adapted the story in a two-episode adventure, starring Harry Attwell as Sherlock Holmes, Paul Waggott as Dr. John Watson and Marta da Silva as Mariana "Mrs. Hudson" Ametxazurra.

In 2025, Paul Waggott of the Sherlock & Co. podcast reprised his role as John Watson, reading the original text of the story as an audiobook, from Watson's first-person perspective.
