= The Five Orange Pips =

Short story by Arthur Conan Doyle featuring Sherlock Holmes

- Short story by Arthur Conan Doyle
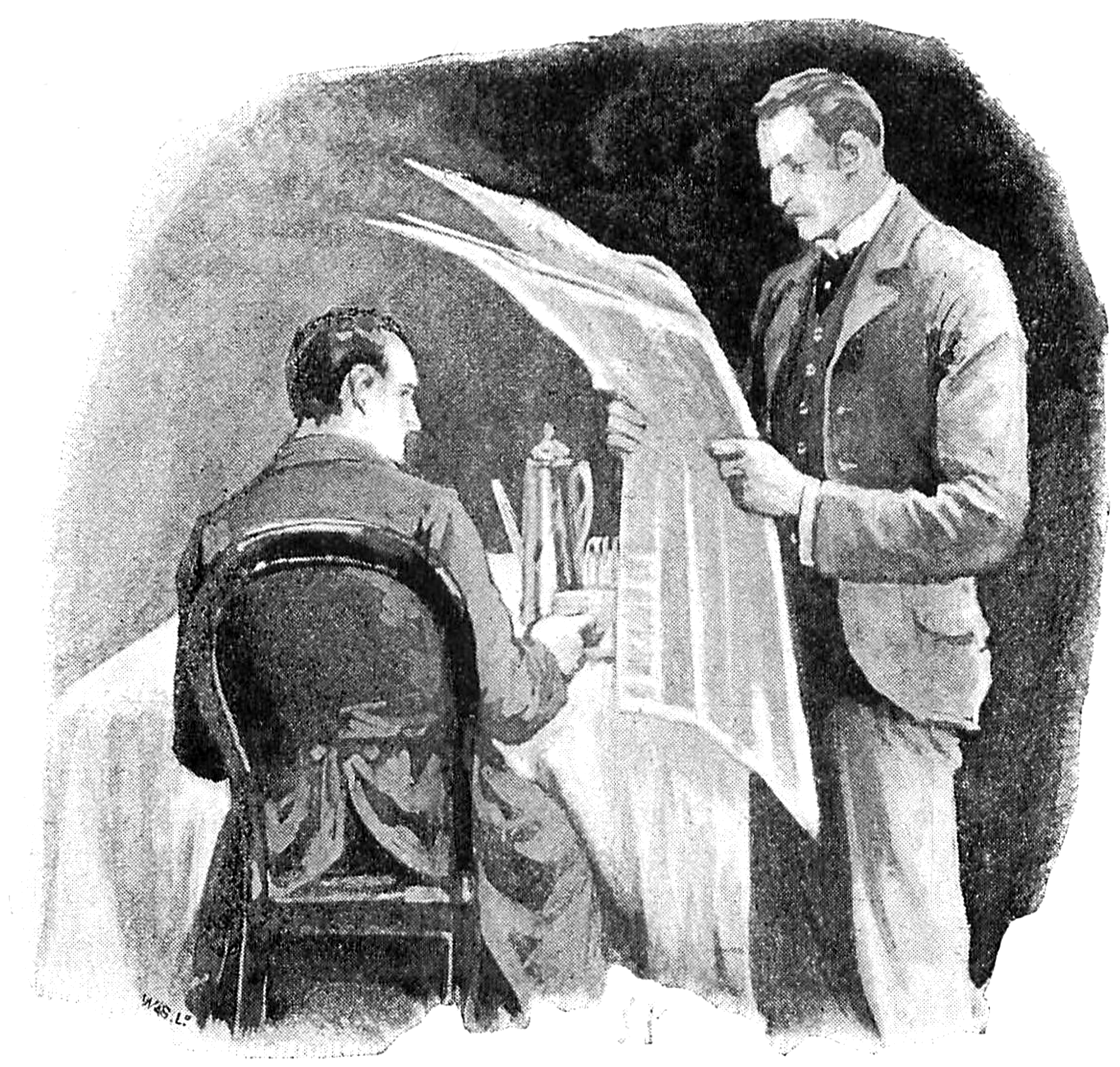
- Watson reads Holmes the latest news about their client John Openshaw, 1891 illustration by Sidney Paget

Text available at Wikisource
- Country: United Kingdom
- Language: English
- Genre: Detective fiction short stories

Publication
- Published in: Strand Magazine
- Publication date: November 1891

Chronology
- Series: The Adventures of Sherlock Holmes
The Boscombe Valley Mystery	The Man with the Twisted Lip

"The Five Orange Pips", one of the 56 Sherlock Holmes short stories written by Sir Arthur Conan Doyle, is the fifth of the twelve stories in The Adventures of Sherlock Holmes.

The story was first published in The Strand Magazine in November 1891. This is also one of only two Sherlock Holmes short stories where Holmes' client dies after seeking his help, the other being "The Adventure of the Dancing Men".

== Plot ==
A young gentleman named John Openshaw visits Holmes one night with a strange story. His uncle Elias had emigrated to the United States as a young man, establishing himself as a planter in Florida and joining the Confederate States Army, in which he rose to the rank of colonel. In 1869 or 1870, he returned to England and purchased an estate near Horsham in Sussex, adopting a reclusive lifestyle. He later allowed John to live on the estate and gave him full access to the property, except for one storage room that was always kept locked.

On 10 March 1883, Elias received a letter postmarked Pondicherry, bearing the inscription "K.K.K." and containing only five orange pips.

The arrival of this letter badly unnerved Elias, and he sent John to bring a lawyer to the estate. By the time John returned, Elias had retrieved a box marked "K.K.K." from the locked room and burned its contents. Elias made a will naming his brother Joseph (John's father) as his heir, with the intent that John should eventually inherit the estate from him. Elias's already-reclusive behaviour became even more bizarre; he would either lock himself in his room and drink heavily, or rush about the grounds in a frenzy while carrying a pistol. On 2 May 1883, seven weeks after receiving the letter, he was found dead in a garden pool. The death was ruled a suicide, but John did not believe that Elias could have killed himself.

Joseph took possession of the estate and examined the room, finding scattered records of Elias's time in the United States. On 4 January 1885 he received a letter postmarked Dundee, identical to the one received by Elias and containing instructions to put "the papers" on the sundial in the garden. John realised that the papers being demanded must have been the ones burned by Elias. Despite John's urging, Joseph decided not to involve the police. Three days later, he was found dead at the bottom of a chalk pit; the death was ruled an accident but again John had his doubts.

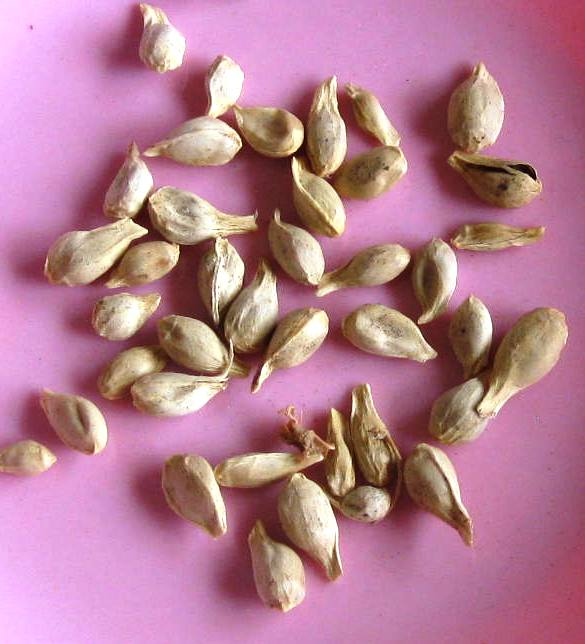
Orange pips (seeds)

John has now received a letter postmarked London that orders him to put the papers on the sundial, but the local police are convinced that the letters are merely practical jokes. The only clue he can provide is a page from Elias's diary, dated March 1869 and detailing that pips were sent to three men; two were later "cleared" and one was "visited”. Holmes suggests that John put the page in the box that had contained the other papers, along with a note detailing their destruction, and leave the box on the sundial.

After John departs, Holmes deduces that Elias had returned to England and gone into hiding because something in the United States had prompted him to flee for his life. Holmes further concludes that the letters were sent from a sailing ship, based on their postmarks and the time lapse between the first two mailings and the recipients' deaths. He recognises "K.K.K." as the Ku Klux Klan, an anti-Reconstruction group in the South that was active until its sudden collapse in 1869 – triggered, Holmes theorises, by Elias's return to England with vital records that the other members have since been trying to recover. Opponents of the Klan would receive a warning and would be killed unless they either fled or renounced their opposition.

The next morning's newspaper carries an article on the discovery of John's body in the River Thames, apparently the result of an accidental drowning after he had fallen off Waterloo Bridge. Now convinced that all three Openshaw men were murdered, Holmes spends the day checking the records of sailing ships and finds only one that could have been in Pondicherry, Dundee and London when the letters were posted – an American barque, the Lone Star. He puts five orange pips into an envelope with the note "S.H. for J.O.", addresses it to the captain, and mails it to the vessel's home port of Savannah, Georgia. He also sends a telegram to the Savannah police informing them that the captain and mates – the only American crewmen – are wanted in England for murder.

Holmes' desire for vengeance ultimately goes unfulfilled, as the Lone Star is destroyed in a severe gale. No trace is ever found except for a broken sternpost marked "L.S.", seen floating on the waves of the Atlantic Ocean.

== Note ==
At the time of writing the actual Ku Klux Klan was indeed broken and effectively defunct, and it would be decades before its 20th-century revival. Conan Doyle's taking it up in this story was in line with his recurrent theme of wild and violent Americans and other foreigners exporting their power struggles to Victorian Britain – which had already formed the basis to A Study in Scarlet, the very first Holmes mystery.

== Publication history ==
"The Five Orange Pips" was first published in the UK in The Strand Magazine in November 1891 and in the United States in the US edition of the Strand in December 1891. The story was published with six illustrations by Sidney Paget in The Strand Magazine. It was included in the short-story collection The Adventures of Sherlock Holmes, which was published in October 1892.

== Adaptations ==
=== Radio ===
Edith Meiser adapted the story as an episode of the American radio series The Adventures of Sherlock Holmes, which was broadcast on 9 March 1931, starring Richard Gordon as Sherlock Holmes and Leigh Lovell as Dr Watson. A remake of the script was broadcast on 5 September 1936 (with Gordon as Holmes and Harry West as Watson).

Meiser also adapted the story as an episode of the American radio series The New Adventures of Sherlock Holmes with Basil Rathbone as Holmes and Nigel Bruce as Watson. The episode was broadcast on 1 February 1942.

A radio adaptation was broadcast on the BBC Home Service in 1952 as part of the 1952–1969 radio series starring Carleton Hobbs as Holmes and Norman Shelley as Watson. It was adapted by Felix Felton. Other adaptations of the story in the same series were broadcast on the BBC Home Service in 1957 (again adapted by Felton, with a slightly different supporting cast) and on the BBC Light Programme in 1966 (adapted by Michael Hardwick).

"The Five Orange Pips" was dramatised by Vincent McInerney for BBC Radio 4 in 1990 as part of the 1989–1998 radio series starring Clive Merrison as Holmes and Michael Williams as Watson.

A 2007 episode of The Classic Adventures of Sherlock Holmes, a series on the American radio show Imagination Theatre, was adapted from the story, with John Patrick Lowrie as Holmes and Lawrence Albert as Watson.

=== Film and television ===
The 1945 film Sherlock Holmes and the House of Fear is partly based on "The Five Orange Pips".

An episode of the animated television series Sherlock Holmes in the 22nd Century was based on the story. The episode, entitled "The Five Orange Pips", was broadcast in 2000.

The third episode of the 2010 BBC Sherlock series, entitled "The Great Game", made reference to five pips being sent by an assassin organization as a warning. In the episode, these pips were five electronic beeps, like the pips (the time signal) broadcast on the hour by the BBC's analogue radio stations. The Sherlock 2016 Special "The Abominable Bride" also refers to the original short story, with a murder victim being mailed five orange pips as a threat before being killed. There is also a secret organisation—similar to the KKK only in its hooded costumes—related to the case in the episode.

The November 2014 episode of Elementary entitled "The Five Orange Pipz" takes some elements from this short story. The unusual "Pipz" spelling is the trademarked name of a fictional bead toy where a manufacturing error rendered the orange beads poisonous when ingested by children.
