= The Adventure of the Blanched Soldier =

- Short story by Arthur Conan Doyle
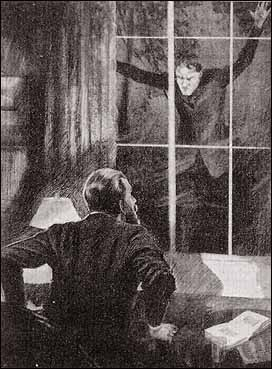
- 1926 illustration by Howard K. Elcock

Publication
- Publication date: 1926

Chronology
- Series: The Case-Book of Sherlock Holmes
The Three Gables	The Lion's Mane

"The Adventure of the Blanched Soldier" (1926) is one of 12 Sherlock Holmes short stories by British writer Arthur Conan Doyle included in The Case-Book of Sherlock Holmes. It was first published in the US in Liberty in October 1926, and in the UK in The Strand Magazine in November 1926, and is one of 56 short stories in the canon of Sherlock Holmes. This story is one of only two narrated by Holmes rather than Doctor Watson, the other being "The Adventure of the Lion's Mane" (1926). Dr Watson does not appear in either story.

== Plot ==
In January 1903, at Baker Street, James M. Dodd comes to Holmes with a strange story regarding his friend, Godfrey Emsworth. Dodd and Emsworth served in the Imperial Yeomanry in South Africa during the Second Boer War. Emsworth was sent home after being treated for a bullet wound; hearing nothing from his friend for quite some time afterward, Dodd began to suspect something was amiss.

Dodd wrote to Colonel Emsworth, Godfrey's father, and was told Godfrey had gone on a voyage round the world for his health. Dodd found it odd that Godfrey himself had not written to him about this matter, and managed to convince Godfrey's mother to invite him to the Emsworth family home, Tuxbury Old Park, near Bedford. There were four people there—the colonel and his wife, and an old butler and his wife. The irritable colonel repeated the story about his son's world voyage, implied Dodd was lying about knowing Godfrey, and abruptly refused Dodd's request for Godfrey's contact information.

That evening, in the ground-floor bedroom, Dodd talked to the butler, Ralph. After Ralph mentioned Godfrey in the past tense, Dodd asked if Godfrey was dead, to which the butler replied "I wish to God he was, Sir!" After Ralph had left, Dodd was considering what the phrase might mean, when he suddenly saw Godfrey's face looking in on him through the window. Godfrey's skin was blotched white in places, and when he realized he had been spotted, he fled into the night. Dodd pursued him, but stopped after hearing a door slam in the distance.

Determined to solve the mystery, Dodd contrived to stay one more night in Tuxbury Old Park. While exploring the estate, he met a small, well-dressed man coming out of one of the outbuildings. The man also indicated Godfrey had gone away, but Dodd later noticed the man watching him suspiciously. Fearing that Godfrey was being held against his will in the outbuilding, Dodd secretly returned to the building at night and looked through the window. He spotted the well-dressed man reading a paper in one chair, and Godfrey sitting in another chair, his back to the window. At this point, Colonel Emsworth discovered what Dodd was up to, berated him for violating the family privacy, and ordered him off the premises.

After hearing Dodd's story, Holmes asks two questions; one, to clarify Godfrey's strange blanched appearance, and two, what sort of paper the well-dressed man was reading, though Dodd is uncertain of the answer to the second question. The two agree to return to Tuxbury Old Park in a week's time.

Upon his arrival at Tuxbury Old Park, Holmes observes Ralph removing a pair of tarry-smelling leather gloves, indicating the presence of disinfectants. The colonel threatens to summon the police if Dodd and Holmes do not leave, but Holmes points out that this would make the family secret public. He writes the word "leprosy" on a piece of paper and shows it to the colonel; realising that Holmes knows all, the colonel agrees to grant Holmes and Dodd an interview with Godfrey.

The young soldier orders them to keep their distance while he tells his story. When he was wounded in South Africa, he had dragged himself to a nearby building and slept in a bed there; in the morning, a doctor on the premises found him, and informed him that the building was a leper hospital and that Godfrey was in danger of catching the disease. Godfrey was sent to a regular hospital, and later back home to England; however, some weeks later, white blotches began to appear on his skin. Fearing he had caught leprosy, and knowing that he would be forced into segregation in a leper colony if the British authorities found out, Godfrey and his parents decided that he should hide. The well-dressed man staying with Godfrey is Dr. Kent, a sympathetic local general practitioner who agreed to keep the Emsworth's secret.

The story ends happily. With Dr. Kent's permission, Holmes brings Sir James Saunders, a famous dermatologist from London, to see to Godfrey. Sir James determines that Godfrey is not a leper, but is suffering from ichthyosis, an unsightly but non-contagious treatable disease.

== Related stories ==
Holmes's investigation of the mystery is delayed because he is engaged in clearing up "the case which my friend Watson has described as that of the Abbey School, in which the Duke of Greyminster was so deeply involved". The Duke of Holdernesse was the principal client in the case of the Priory School.

== Publication history ==
"The Adventure of the Blanched Soldier" was first published in the US in Liberty in October 1926, and in the UK in The Strand Magazine in November 1926. The story was published with five illustrations by Frederic Dorr Steele in Liberty, and with five illustrations by Howard K. Elcock in the Strand. It was included in the short story collection The Case-Book of Sherlock Holmes, which was published in the UK and the US in June 1927.

The original manuscript of the story is now part of the Berg Collection at the New York Public Library.

== Adaptations ==
=== Radio and audio dramas ===
The story was dramatised by Edith Meiser as episodes of the American radio series The Adventures of Sherlock Holmes that aired on 2 March 1931 (with Richard Gordon as Sherlock Holmes and Leigh Lovell as Dr. Watson) and 2 May 1936 (with Gordon as Holmes and Harry West as Watson).

Meiser also adapted the story as an episode of the American radio series The New Adventures of Sherlock Holmes that aired on 19 February 1940 (with Basil Rathbone as Holmes and Nigel Bruce as Watson).

Michael Hardwick dramatised "The Blanched Soldier" for the BBC Light Programme in August 1959 as part of the 1952–1969 radio series starring Carleton Hobbs as Sherlock Holmes and Norman Shelley as Dr. Watson, with Frederick Treves as James M. Dodd.

The story was adapted for BBC Radio 4 in 1994 by Roger Danes as part of the 1989–1998 radio series starring Clive Merrison as Holmes and Michael Williams as Watson. It featured Robert Glenister as James Dodd, Hannah Gordon as Jean Watson, and Derek Waring as Colonel Emsworth.

In 2014, the story was adapted for radio as an episode of The Classic Adventures of Sherlock Holmes, a series on the American radio show Imagination Theatre, with John Patrick Lowrie as Holmes and Lawrence Albert as Watson.

In 2025, the podcast Sherlock & Co. adapted the story in a two-episode adventure called "The Blanched Soldier", starring Harry Attwell as Sherlock Holmes, Paul Waggott as Dr. John Watson and Marta da Silva as Mariana "Mrs. Hudson" Ametxazurra.

=== Literature ===
It was adapted into one of the books of the Hong Kong children's book series The Great Detective Sherlock Holmes, as "The Blanched Soldier" (連環失蹤大探案). It is Book #22 of the original Chinese version, and book #18 of the English version.

== Sources ==
- Cawthorne, Nigel (2011). A Brief History of Sherlock Holmes. Running Press. ISBN 978-0762444083.
- Dickerson, Ian (2019). Sherlock Holmes and His Adventures on American Radio. BearManor Media. ISBN 978-1629335087.
- Smith, Daniel (2014) [2009]. The Sherlock Holmes Companion: An Elementary Guide (Updated ed.). Aurum Press. ISBN 978-1-78131-404-3.
