= Sherlock Holmes (Éclair film series) =

Silent movie

- Directed by: Georges Tréville
- Based on: The Sherlock Holmes stories by Sir Arthur Conan Doyle
- Produced by: Georges Tréville
- Starring: Georges Tréville
- Production company: Éclair
- Countries: France; United Kingdom

Sherlock Holmes is a French–British silent film series consisting of eight short films which were produced in 1912 by Éclair.

== Production ==
In 1912, Sir Arthur Conan Doyle sold the film rights of the Sherlock Holmes character to Éclair. French actor Georges Tréville produced and directed the series as well as starred in the title role of Sherlock Holmes. Filmed in England, each film ran approximately 1,700 feet. The series consists of two-reel films. Only loosely based on Doyle's stories, the Franco-British productions were released in America before reaching the rest of the world.

The first three films were released in 1912 and the final five in 1913.

== Cast ==
- Georges Tréville as Sherlock Holmes
- Mr. Moyse as Dr Watson (all but The Speckled Band)

== Films ==
- The Speckled Band (1912)
- Silver Blaze (1912)
- The Beryl Coronet (1912)
- The Musgrave Ritual (1913)
- The Reigate Squires (1913)
- The Stolen Papers (an adaptation of "The Adventure of the Naval Treaty") (1913)
- The Mystery of the Boscombe Valley (1913)
- The Copper Beeches (1913)

== Sources ==
- Barnes, Alan (2011). Sherlock Holmes on Screen. Titan Books. ISBN 9780857687760.
- Boström, Mattias (2018). From Holmes to Sherlock. Mysterious Press. ISBN 978-0-8021-2789-1.
- Bunson, Matthew (1997). Encyclopedia Sherlockiana. Simon & Schuster. ISBN 0-02-861679-0.
- Davies, David Stuart (1978). Holmes of the Movies. Bramhall House. ISBN 0-517-232790.
- Davies, David Stuart (2007). Starring Sherlock Holmes. Titan Books. ISBN 978-1845765378.
- Eyles, Allen (1986). Sherlock Holmes: A Centenary Celebration. Harper & Row. ISBN 0-06-015620-1.
- Pitts, Michael R. (1991). Famous Movie Detectives II. Scarecrow Press. ISBN 9780810823457.
