= Corps of Commissionaires =

Movement employing veterans in Commonwealth countries

The Corps of Commissionaires refers to a movement in Commonwealth countries of societies that provide meaningful employment for veterans of the armed services.

The Commissionaires movement traces its roots to 1859, when retired army officer Captain Sir Edward Walter KCB organised eight injured veterans of the Crimean War and Indian Mutiny to act as nightwatchmen. At first limited to wounded men, it soon expanded to include all honourably discharged army and navy veterans. In the 1860s the corps expanded beyond London, with branches opening across the United Kingdom. By 1874 it had nearly 500 employees, and by 1911 over 4,000. In 1969 its scope was widened to include former members of other uniformed services, including the police and fire brigade.

Sir Edward Walter was the Corps' first commanding officer and was succeeded by his nephew, Major Frederick Edward Walter. Control of the Corps remained with the Walter family until the retirement of Lieutenant-Colonel Reginald Walter in 1975.

Commissionaires appear in several of the Sherlock Holmes stories by Sir Arthur Conan Doyle, including "A Study in Scarlet", "The Adventure of the Blue Carbuncle" and "The Adventure of the Naval Treaty."

== Active Corps ==
- Corps of Commissionaires (United Kingdom), established in 1859, is now organised as a private security company operating as Corps Security and employing 5,000 in the United Kingdom and Papua New Guinea.
- Canadian Corps of Commissionaires, established in 1925, is a nonprofit organization operating as a federation of 15 Divisions and employing 23,000 in Canada.

== Former Corps ==
- Australian Corps of Commissionaires
- South African Corps of Commissionaires
