= Mental illness in ancient Rome =

Mental illnesses and their treatments in Ancient Rome

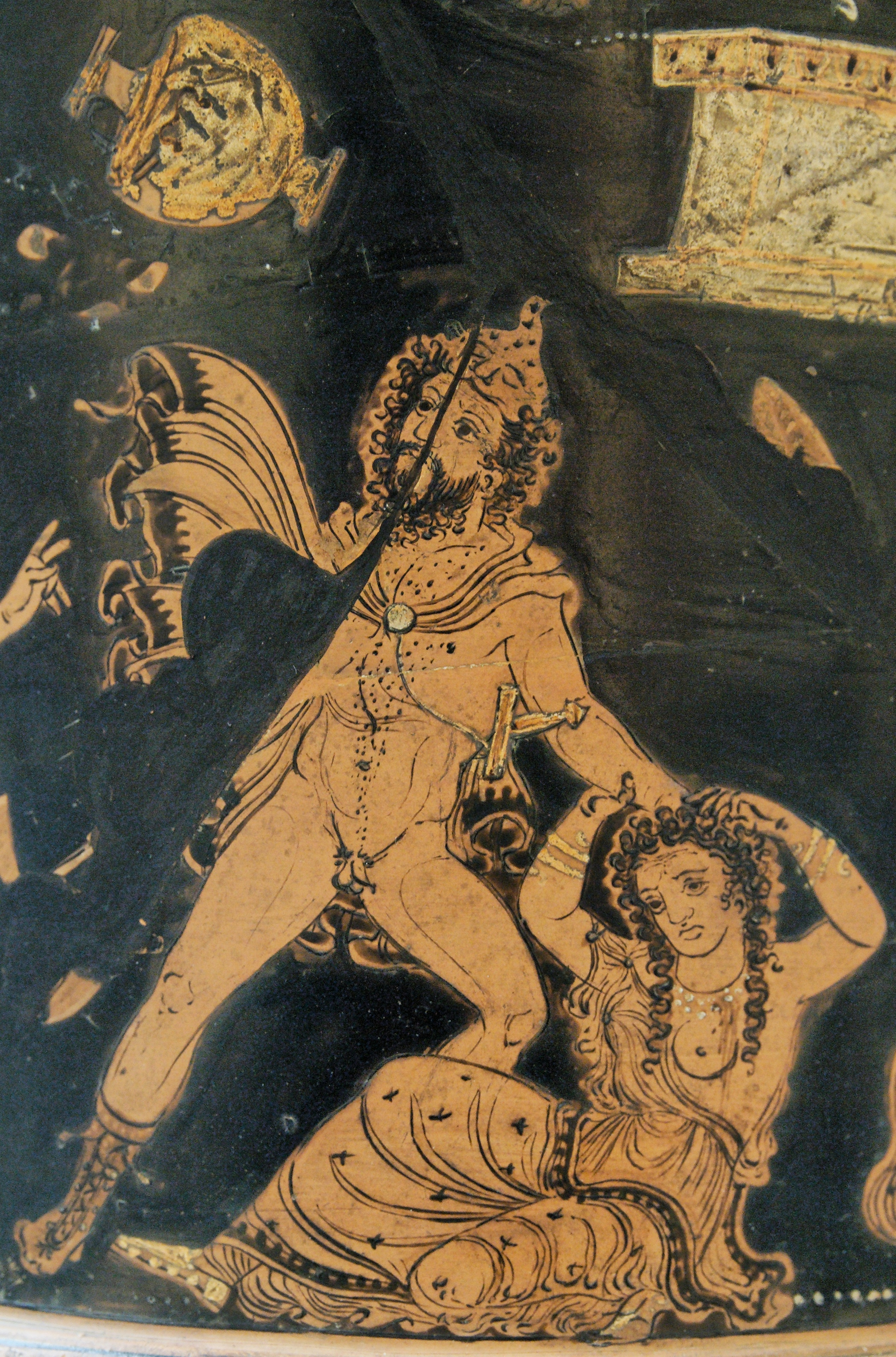
Apulian pottery depicting Lycrugus of Thrace, an ancient Greek king driven mad by Dionysus

Mental illness in ancient Rome was recognized in law as an issue of mental competence, and was diagnosed and treated in terms of ancient medical knowledge and philosophy, primarily Greek in origin, while at the same time popularly thought to have been caused by divine punishment, demonic spirits, or curses. Physicians and medical writers of the Roman world observed patients with conditions similar to anxiety disorders, mood disorders, dyslexia, schizophrenia, and speech disorders, among others, and assessed symptoms and risk factors for mood disorders as owing to alcohol abuse, aggression, and extreme emotions. It can be difficult to apply modern labels such as schizophrenia accurately to conditions described in ancient medical writings and other literature, which may for instance be referring instead to mania.

Treatments included therapeutic philosophy, intellectual activities, emetics, leeching, bloodletting, venipuncture, sensory manipulation and control of environmental factors, exercise and physical therapy, and medicaments.

== Anxiety disorders ==
Some Romans used magico-medical practices such as chants (carmina) and amulets to cope with anxiety and provide reassurance, but Roman physicians and philosophers classified severe anxiety as a diagnosable medical condition and developed theoretical approaches and therapeutic methods to address it. The Roman orator and sometime philosopher Cicero (1st century BC) distinguished between anxietas, worry about future events, and angor, an outburst of emotion.

Galen, a Greek physician and surgeon who immigrated to Rome in the 2nd century, observed patients with symptoms resembling generalized anxiety disorder or major depressive disorder, such as sweating, indigestion, palpitations, dizziness, fever, weight loss, insomnia, changing skin color, low heartbeat, and an irregular heartbeat. People with this disease are described as having a progression of anxiety and sadness. It was believed that such anxiety could result in death. Galen theorized that this syndrome emerges from an emotion he calls lypē.

Stoicism, as a philosophy centered on using self-control to overcome negative emotions, theorized methods of handling anxiety. Stoic methods have been reinterpreted in light of modern treatments for anxiety disorders, such as cognitive behavioral therapy. The Stoics practiced the technique of negative visualization, which involved considering the worst possible outcome of an action or event in order to prepare oneself for the consequences of it. They would rehearse mentally how they would respond to anticipated problems and try to find a way to change negative situations into positive outcomes. The purpose was to train the practitioner to have little fear and eventually be able to remain calm in difficult situations. The Roman Stoic Seneca believed that to cure anxiety, one must focus on the present moment.

The Imperial-era historian and essayist Plutarch describes a Roman man possibly with scrupulosity, guilt or anxiety over religious subjects commonly associated with obsessive–compulsive disorder and obsessive–compulsive personality disorder (only OCD is recognized as an anxiety disorder). This man is described as "turning pale under his crown of flowers," praying with a "faltering voice," and scattering "incense with trembling hands."

== Mood disorders ==
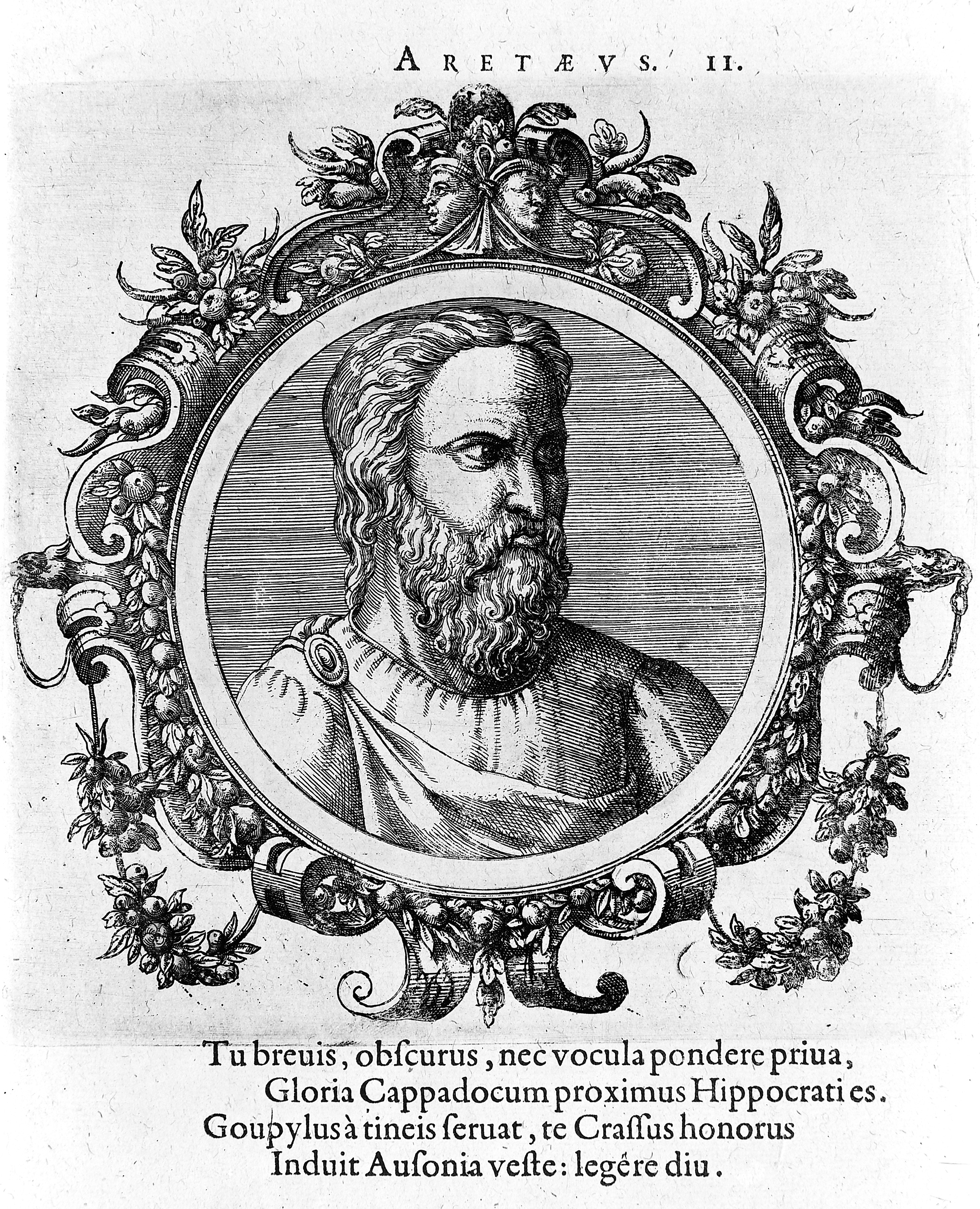
Aretaeus of Cappadocia, the Greek physician who studied patients today presumed to have had bipolar disorder

Mood disorders were frequently described in Greco-Roman medical literature of the Roman Imperial era, including a condition resulting in poor appetite, lethargy, sleeplessness, irritability, agitation, long-lasting fears, and hopelessness, and melancholia, which is now known as depression. Galen believed this disorder also caused delusions, anguish, and cancer, writing that phobias and dysthymia, another depressive disorder, could cause melancholia. Alcohol abuse, hypersexuality, aggression, and extreme emotions were thought to increase the risk of developing this disorder. It is unclear whether ancient doctors thought of depression and mania as separate conditions or one singular condition.

Rufus of Ephesus wrote that melancholiacs experienced episodes of fear, indigestion, doubt, and delusions. Rufus describes melancholiacs who thought that they were pots or that their skin had become parchment. He also observed melancholiacs who experienced changes in appearance and behavior, such as darkened complexion, protruding eyes, more hair, and disfluency. Rufus divided melancholia into three categories: type 1, when the body became completely filled with melancholic blood; type 2, when only the brain was affected; and type 3, primarily affecting the hypochdonrium.

Soranus, also from Ephesus (in present-day Turkey), noticed that the condition of melancholics improved after they drank from certain alkaline springs nearby, which have been shown to contain lithium, a chemical element used to treat bipolar disorder.

The Latin medical writer Celsus recommended bloodletting to treat melancholia, or hellebore to make the patient vomit if bloodletting was not an option. Patients were also to engage in exercise and intellectual activities, and abstain from wine. Other common treatments included applying cool materials to a patient's head.

Aretaeus of Cappadocia, a Greek physician who lived in the Roman province of Cappadocia, describes melancholic patients who experienced episodes of depression and suicidal ideation alongside episodes of "impure dreams" in which they experience "irresistible desires." In this state they are easily angered by criticism and become "wholly mad." Aretaeus also describes people with this disease experiencing hallucinations and delusions. This disorder resembles bipolar disorder, which is defined by episodes of mania and depression. It was thought to be caused by too much black and yellow bile.

Seasonal affective disorder is a medical condition in which the affected person experiences mood changes alongside seasonal changes. One treatment for this disorder is light therapy. The Romans knew that exposure to light could serve as a treatment for those affected by certain conditions. Cicero experienced several depressive episodes over the course of his lifetime. During these periods he kept a journal documenting his days, and his sadness. This technique has been found to alleviate depression and sadness, and it is a form of therapy still used today.

== Intellectual disabilities ==
Treatments for intellectual disabilities included nutritional diets combined with exercise. Because of the importance of eloquent speech among the Roman upper classes and of oratory in politics, speech disorders (tarditas ingenii or lingua impromptus) were thought to indicate a lack of intelligence. Stuttering, characterized by involuntary repetition or prolongations of sounds and pauses in speech, was thought to be caused by an excessively moist or an excessively dry tongue. Galen recommended wrapping the tongue with a cloth soaked in lettuce juice to treat a stutter. Another treatment for a speech disorder was tongue massage and gargling. The emperor Claudius had a speech impediment that may have been caused by cerebral palsy or Tourette syndrome. His own mother thought of him as mentally deficient, less of a man, and "unfinished by nature," reflecting a general prejudice in Roman society.

Livy speaks of Roman adults who could not achieve literacy on par with young children. Such people were possibly dyslexic, and it was recognized that they might require alternative pedagogies. The poet Horace mentions schoolboys encouraged to learn by means of cookies, which may have been actually shaped like or stamped with letters and used for teaching. Atticus Bradua, a consul in AD 185, struggled with reading as a child; among any other methods that may have been tried, his father arranged to have him attended by twenty-four slaves, each named with a different letter of the Latin alphabet. Creative teaching methods, in conjunction with the importance of oral expression in Roman society, meant that dyslexia wasn't necessarily a bar to achievement. The emperor Augustus was described by Suetonius as having difficulty in learning to read or write and remembering his speeches despite his intelligence; dyslexia is one possible cause.

== Schizophrenia ==
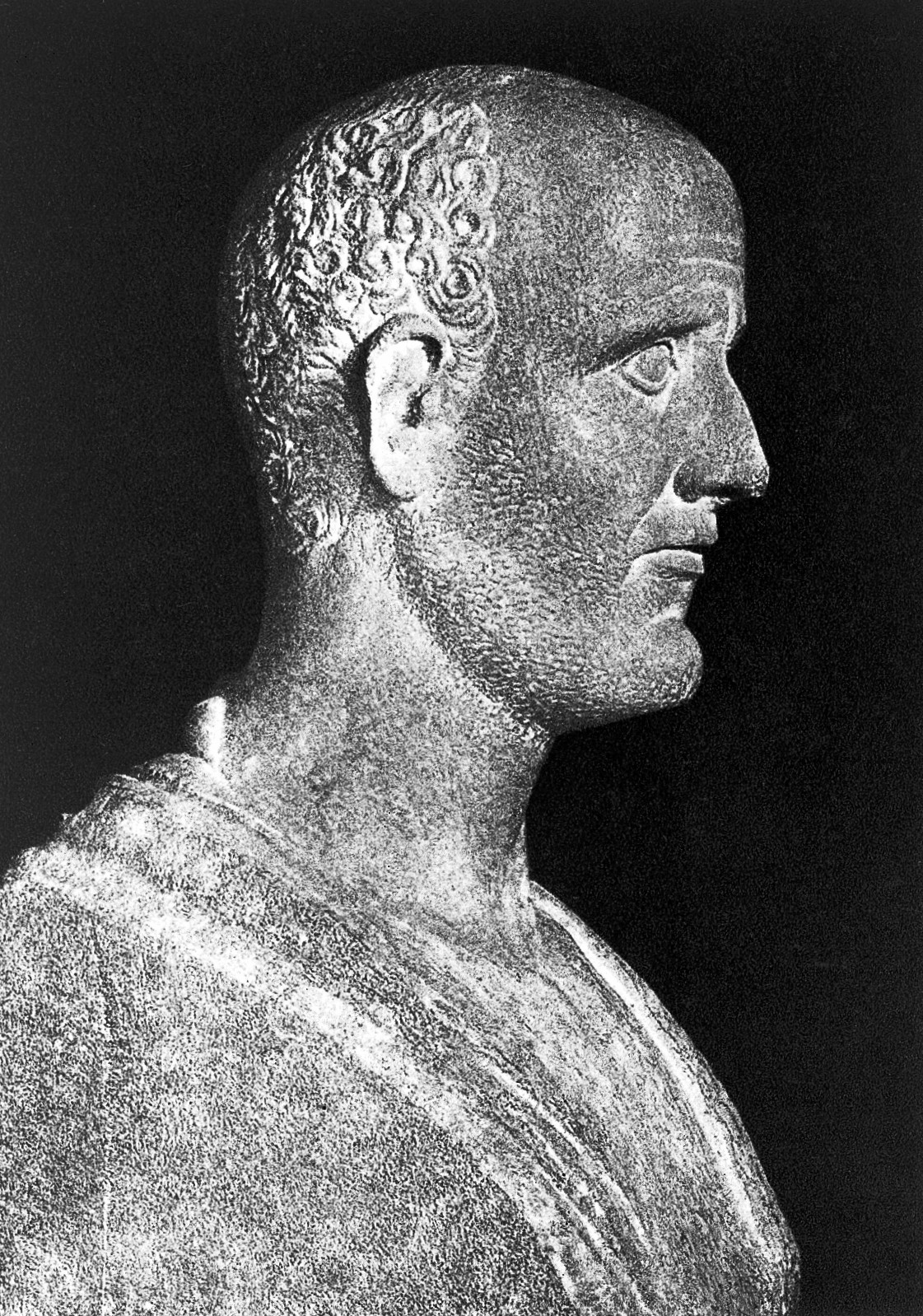
Bust of Asclepiades, a physician who discussed treatments for a mental disorder which may be schizophrenia

Ancient Roman doctors described a condition they termed phrenitis or mania. It was theorized that this condition was caused by high amounts of bile due to fever, which would heat the blood, resulting in the onset of an illness. Ancient doctors noticed that this disorder appeared most frequently in young and middle-aged men, and that it appeared rarely in children, women, or older adults. Modern scholars disagree on the nature of this condition. It is possible that it is schizophrenia. However, others believe that there are no mentions of schizophrenia in ancient literature – that schizophrenia, in its modern form, did not exist in ancient times.

The medical writer Celsus described a mental illness which induced episodes of delirium and incoherent speech. Celsus also wrote about a chronic condition which resulted in "entertaining vain images" and caused the mind to be "at the mercy of such imaginings." He distinguished between differing types of this disease. According to Celsus, some were saddened, some became "hilarious," some began to "rave in words," some remained composed, others became "rebellious and violent." Various types of violence are described. Some "do harm by impulse," while others appear to remain sane, yet still commit elaborate acts of violence. Celsus may be describing delusions caused by psychosis, which are false beliefs unable to be changed by evidence to the contrary. He also may be describing a depressive disorder. Celsus mentions certain delusions. He states that one patient believed they could interact with Ajax or Orestes. Arataeus writes about mentally ill people with hallucinations, disorganized speech, delusions, social withdrawal, poor performance at work, and catatonia. He believed that these people had mania, however they may have had schizophrenia.

A variety of treatments were used. For example, doctors would express disapproval of excessive laughter. Cymbals were used to play music, which was thought to reduce melancholic thoughts. Philosophers were used to alleviate the fear and worry the patient experiences. Doctors recommended that patients should be treated through conversation. Servants were supposed to engage in dialogue with the patient. However, they should not agree with everything they say, as this might feed into the delusions. They were also not supposed to disagree with everything the person said, as this might enrage them. The patients were also provided a variety of intellectual activities to keep them engaged. These activities would have been tailored to each patient.

It was common to treat these people by confining them to a dark room. Celsus believed that this form of therapy's usefulness varied from person to person. Some will be frightened by the darkness, other will be calmed. He recommended that "strong" patients should be kept in a bright room, and "weak" ones should be kept in a dim room. Celsus also recommended torture. Violent patients were restrained using chains and flogging. Deprivation of light, immersion into cold water, torturous exercise, food deprivation were all used. Patients were also supposed to only be left with people they were familiar with, and frequently travel and move. They were forced to pay attention and memorize this torture, thus preventing patients from acting out through fear. This treatment was dismissed by two physicians Asclepiades of Bithynia and Soranus of Ephesus as inhumane. They believed that instead, patients should kept in a moderately light room located on the ground floor, eat a simple diet, and have regular exercise. They also recommended that soft fabrics, wool, or servant's hands should be used instead of chains to restrain them.

Bloodletting was another contentious topic. Asclepiades believed it to be equivalent to murder. Celsus disagreed, stating that if a patient was "strong," it must be administered if they are experiencing an extreme episode of the condition. He also recommended that one day after the bloodletting the head should be shaved and cleaned with water. Herbs such as verbena would be boiled in the water. Another procedure consisted of cleaning the head, shaving the head, cleaning it again, then pouring rose oil over it. Concurrent to this, rue pounded with vinegar would be poured over the nose. If the patient is considered "weak" then thyme, or a similar substance, would be applied to rose oil which would then be rubbed over the head. Bitter pellitory herbs would also be applied to the patient's head.

People with this condition also had trouble sleeping and eating. To treat this, they were placed on couches near food. Poppy, Hyoscyamus, saffron ointment, mandrake apples, cardamomum balsam, the sound of falling water, sycamine tears, and mulberry were all thought to aid in sleep. Asclepiades believed these treatments to be ineffective, and that they caused lethargy. Leeches, venesection, and vomiting were also common treatments. An orchid known as white hellebore was used to induce vomit. Doctors would give these patients gruel and mead to eat and drink. Three cups of gruel were given twice a day in winter and three times in summer.

== Substance abuse disorders ==
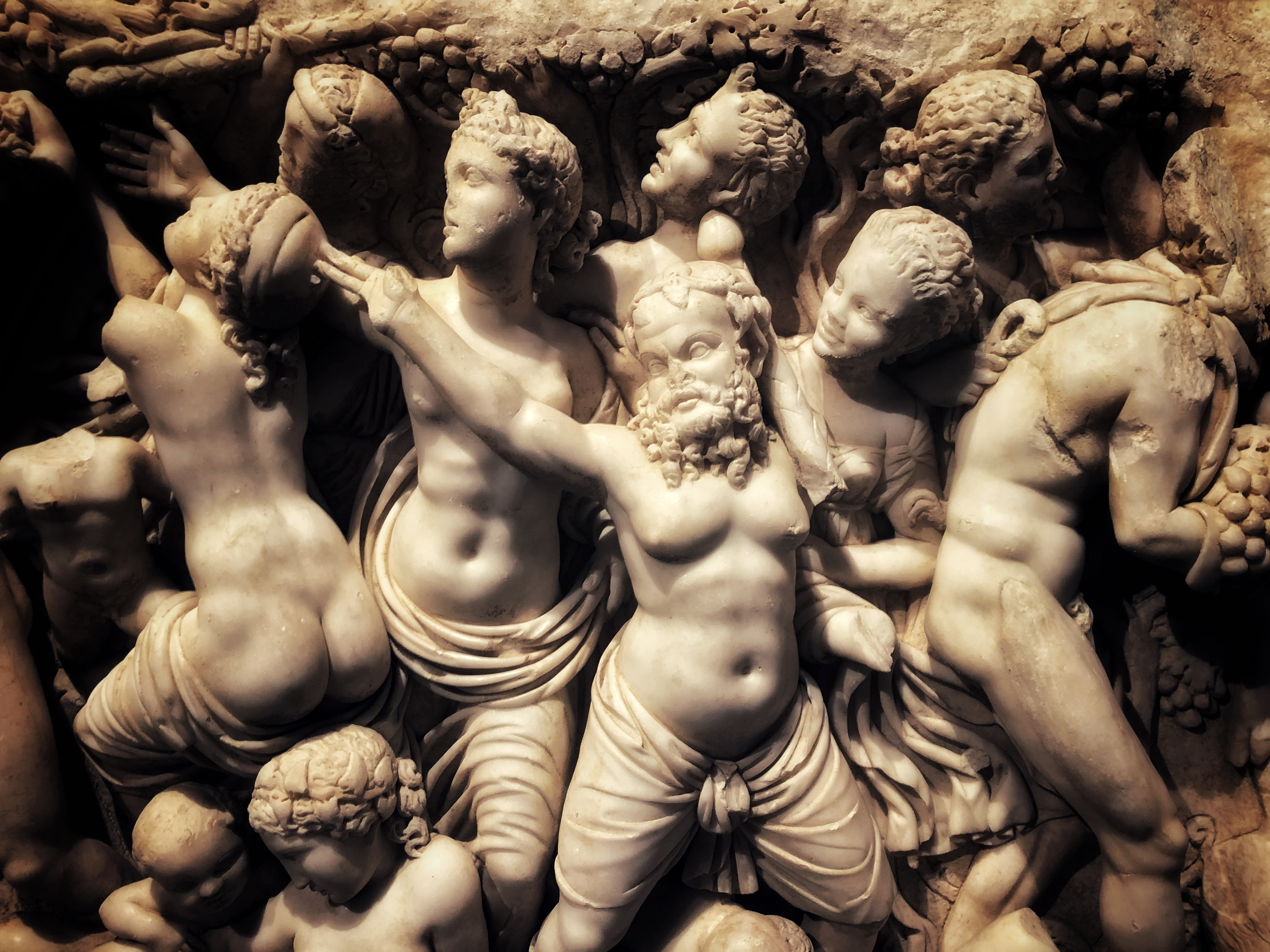
Dionysian scenes were common on Roman-era sarcophagi (detail from the example at the Antalya Archeological Museum, 2nd century)

The Romans generally did not think in terms of "substance abuse", except for alcoholism. Roman writers believed alcoholism would result in decreased sexual potency and damage to the social order, contributing to adultery and promiscuity in women. Despite these concerns, the consumption of wine was widespread amongst all social statuses in Roman society. Pliny believed that "a great part of mankind are of the opinion that there is nothing else in life worth living for" and that alcoholics were "driven to frenzy" and a "thousand crimes." Galen describes a teacher's young slave dying after consuming large amounts of alcohol.

Cannabis was mentioned numerous times in Roman literature. The Romans used the plant to make strong ropes and repel mosquitos. The consumption of cannabis was also believed to decrease sexual activity, cause impotence, and cause nausea. Cannabis was said to cause headaches and a "warm" feeling when consumed in great quantities. Roman doctors were unaware of the plant's psychoactive properties.

Roman doctors used opium to treat illnesses such as insomnia, pain, coughs, hysteria, and conditions involving the digestive system. They were aware of how addictive opium was, and how dangerous an overdose could be.

== Paraphiliac and fetishistic disorders ==
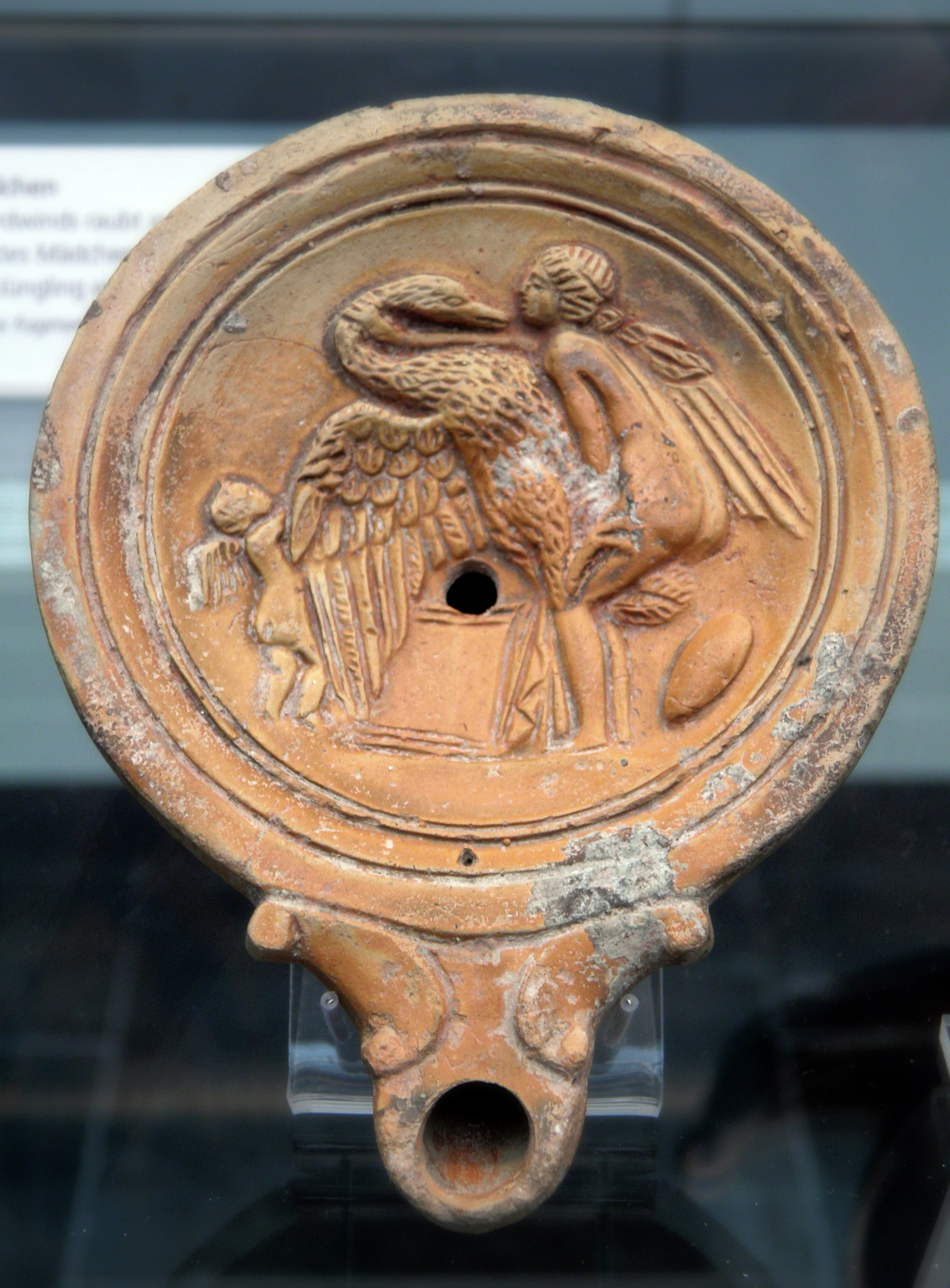
Leda and the swan was a popular subject for art in a range of media, such as this 1st-century oil lamp

Foot fetishism, klismaphilia, and pedophilia were widespread in ancient Rome. Bestiality, or the sexual attraction to animals is prominent in Roman mythology. The Romans would also have animals rape men and women in the Colosseum or Circus Maximus for entertainment. Ancient Roman brothels were often named after the animal species which they offered for sexual purposes. For example, brothels that offered birds were known as ansenarii, if they offered dogs they were termed belluarii, and caprarii were brothels that offered goats.

== Cognitive disorders ==
The ancient Romans were aware of dementia. It was believed that people with the disease were foolish, and no longer contributed to society. The Romans feared dementia, as they thought that a life without intellectual capabilities was not worth living. Delirium was known as a symptom of Phrenitis and Mania. Roman doctors differentiated between delirium, which is extreme confusion, and psychosis, which confusion between what is and is not real. They believed that black bile and plants such as belladonna, mandragona, opium, and thorn apple caused delirium. Celsus and Galen described brain injuries in their writings. These patients have symptoms such as dizziness. Roman doctors associated brain injury with speech impairments, incontinence, and leg paralysis.

== Post-traumatic stress disorder ==
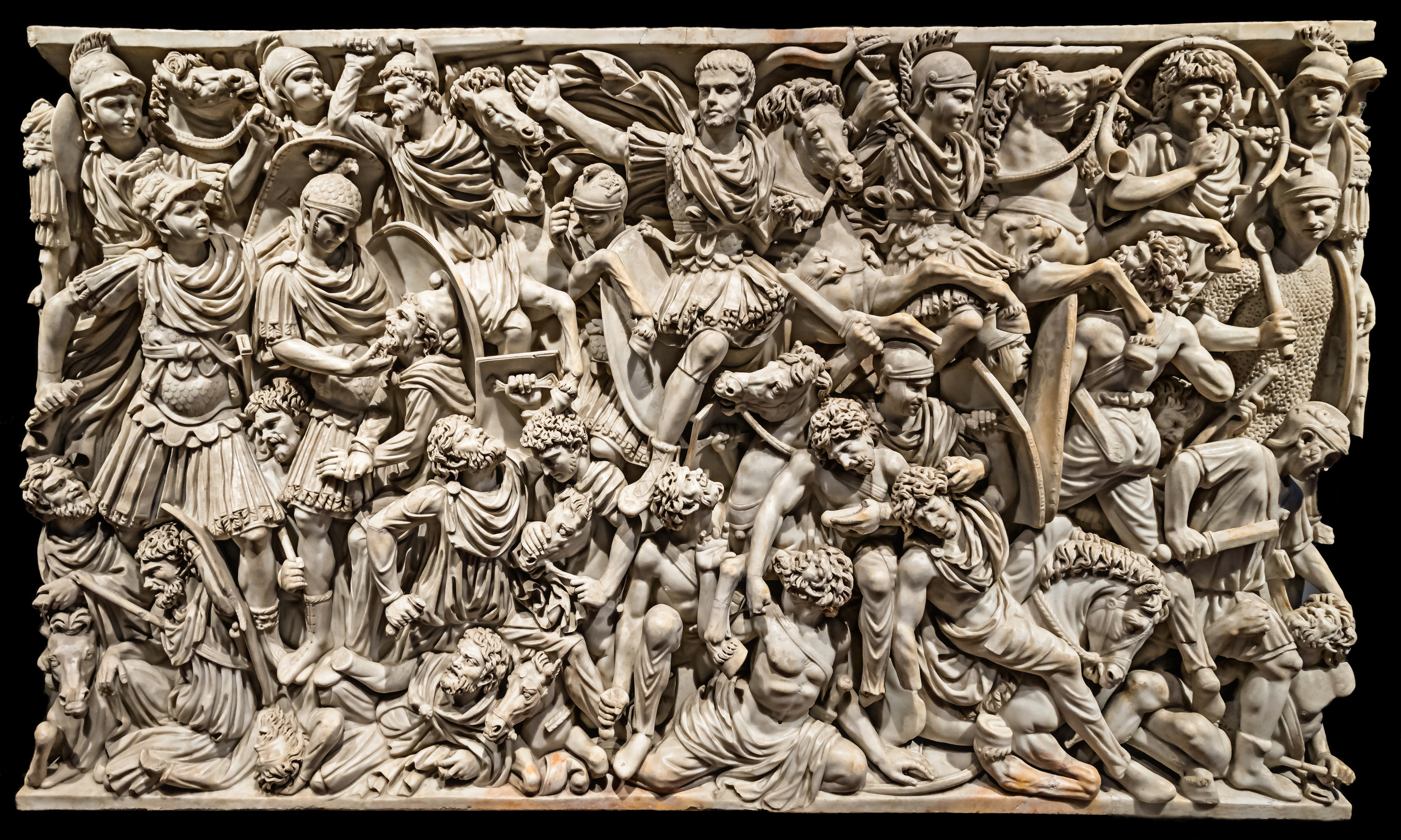
The packed chaos of battle on the Ludovisi sarcophagus (mid-3rd century)

Post-traumatic stress disorder is a disorder defined by stress caused by traumatic events. Cultural differences and differences in warfare likely resulted in PTSD being less prominent in ancient militaries. Soldiers fought in close formations, with less brutal weaponry that what is used in the modern day, in shorter campaigns. They believed what they were doing was a moral responsibility to their society, and they were exposed to violence more frequently. These factors likely contributed to PTSD being rarer in ancient Rome. Soldiers often chose to fight and remain combat rather than face the disgrace and humiliation that refusing to fight would bring upon them, which from the perspective of modern psychology put many soldiers at risk of developing PTSD and acute stress disorder.

The medical writer Celsus described the condition insania sine febre, "mania without fever." This condition involved hearing and seeing things which were not real, irrationality, depression, loss of appetite, frightfulness, mood swings, eye movements, and hypervigilance, for which Celsus prescribed hypericum. Galen, a practicing physician and surgeon, diagnosed patients with anxiety, anger, depression, and malaise, prescribing massages, lukewarm water, wine and water, bathing, exercise, and food with sweet juices.

== Others ==
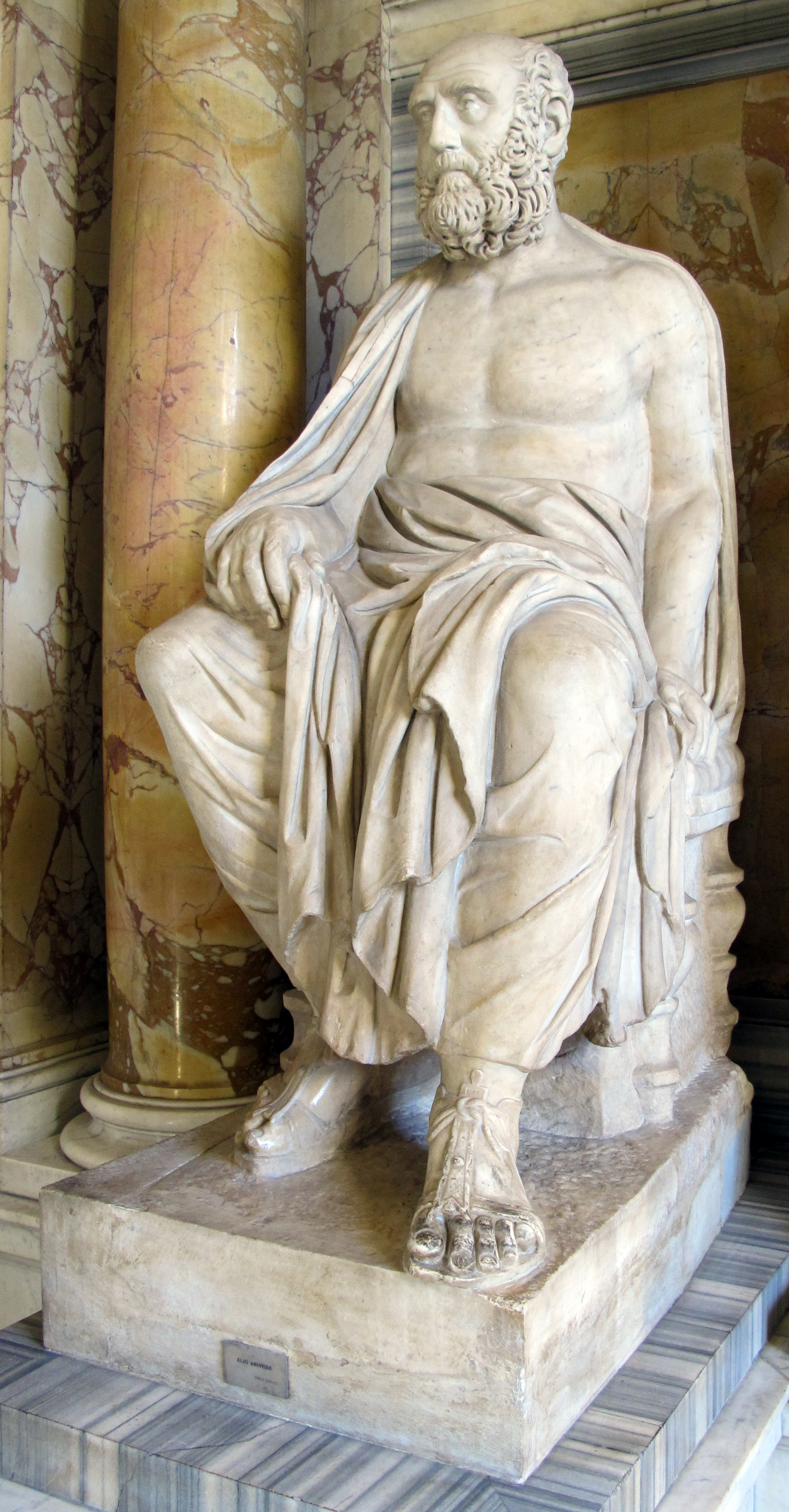
Aelius Aristedes, a Greek writer who may have been a hypochondriac

The Roman satirist Juvenal complained about the noise of the city making it difficult to sleep, causing insomnia. Pervasive insomnia throughout ancient Rome resulted in numerous deaths. They used sleep deprivation to torture criminals and prisoners. Sleepwalking was associated with evil spirits.

Roman men could often develop hypochondriasis due to their tendency to discuss and pay attention to medical matters. Eating disorders were considered to be problematic by the Romans. Galen defines two conditions, lichneia, which was a craving for sweets, and gastrimargia, which is bulimia nervosa. A possible ancient example of anorexia nervosa, an eating disorder characterized by extremely limited consumption of food, involved a Roman saint named Blaesilla. She was a disciple of Jerome. She practiced fasting, eventually succumbing to her hunger and dying at the age of 20.

Ancient writers mention people who faked mental illnesses to escape responsibilities. In the modern day, deliberately feigning a mental illness for attention is known as factitious disorder imposed on self. If done for financial or personal gain, it is known as malingering. If done with a motive on others, it is known as Factitious disorder imposed on another.

Ancient writers, such as Homer, Hippocrates, and Aretaeus, noticed an individual with intense emotions, impulsive behavior, extreme anger, depression, and mania. These symptoms are reminiscent of Borderline personality disorder, a Cluster B personality disorder characterized by unstable relationships, strong emotions, and impulsive behavior.

== Supernatural causes and magic ==
Belief in magic was strong enough that it was an issue in some court cases and certain practices were banned by law. The Apologia of Apuleius is a speech in which he defends himself against charges that he quite literally bewitched his very wealthy older wife, Pudentilla, rendering her mentally incompetent for the purpose of defrauding her. The proof that he had not practiced magic against her, Apuleius argues, is the fact that she retained her high intelligence—the efficacy of magic in debilitating the mind was not in doubt.

Disabilities were popularly thought to have resulted from divine punishment. Demons and evil spirits were supposed to be the source of some mental illnesses. Magical objects were used to treat anger. Users would offload their feelings onto these objects. Popular medications included not only beaver testicles, weasels, and smoked camel brains, but apotropaic practices such as tickling patients with their head near a fire.

== Early science ==
A diagram depicting humorism

Among medical practitioners, philosophers, and scientists, mental illnesses were also attributed to natural or biological causes. The dominant theory in ancient Rome was humorism, which is the idea that each person had a group of four humors. If they were balanced then the individual would develop illnesses, including mental ones. The pulse and heartbeat of the affected person were also used to diagnose. Galen believed that negative emotions imbalanced the mind, causing disease. He believed that these emotions caused blood to retreat to "the depths of the body." Resulting in many negative symptoms and diseases such as melancholia and depression. It was believed that seasons could affect the illnesses. Changes in weather were thought to stir up the humors.

The Romans noticed that diseases and conditions, such as epilepsy, could be inherited. Roman doctors also distinguished between people with mental illness, and those at risk of mental illness. Ancient doctors categorized some people into a "half-mad" category, which meant symptoms only emerged while drunk or stressed.

== In Roman law ==
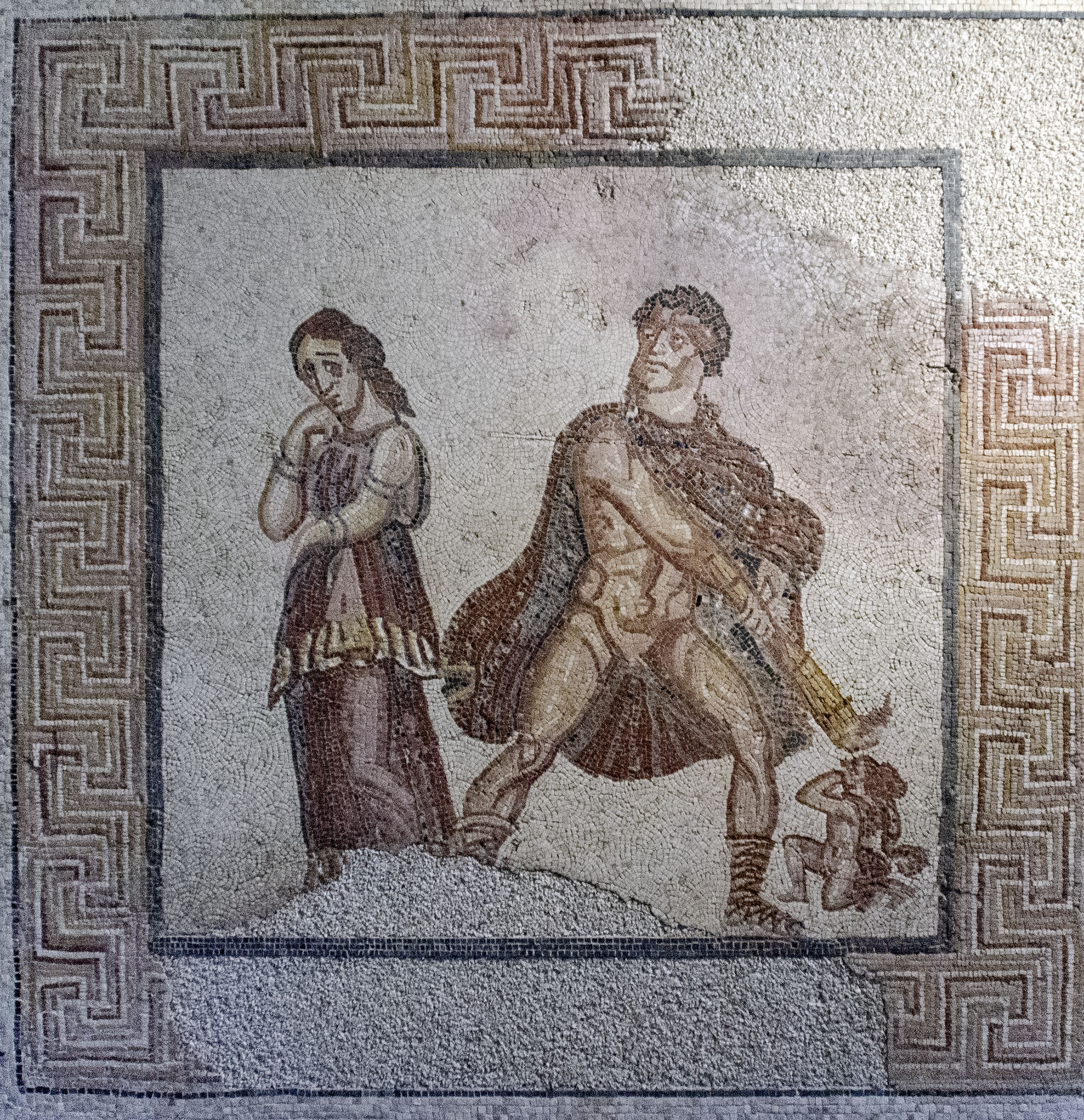
Mosaic from Roman Spain (3rd–4th century) depicting a moment from the temporary madness of Hercules, here estranged from his wife, whom he goes on to kill along with their children

Roman law recognized that a person's ability to make legal decisions might be compromised by a mental disorder. The word for a person thus incapacitated was furiosus, from the abstract noun furor. Other terms in juristic texts include demens (out of one's mind), mente captus (a captive of the mind, in a state of mental seizure), insanus (unwell, mentally ill), non suae sanae mentis (not of right mind), and non compos mentis, which has endured in modern legal language. The terms used in legal texts for insanity have general meanings as well—the poet Ovid describes a mythological woman as not compos mentis when she loses the self-possession of her healthy mind in a highly charged sexual situation—and the criteria used by medical consultants to distinguish mental incompetence under the law have not survived in the written record.

However, many if not most people with serious neurodevelopmental issues would not have made it to adulthood. Disabilities detected in infancy usually led to the child being "exposed," abandoned under conditions likely to cause death. If the intellectually disabled survived to adulthood, they could not exercise their rights as adult Roman citizens and were treated like children who were still minors. But because they could not be held accountable for their actions, they were also exempt under the law from any crimes they committed.

The ability to act under one's own will was a prerequisite for taking legal actions, such as entering into contracts, and since the furiosus was regarded as not acting under his own will, any legal transactions he conducted were invalid. Juristic texts give marriage and the manumission of slaves as examples of actions the furiosus was not legally competent to carry out. However, it was also recognized that the furiosus might have periods of lucidity (intervalla) during which he could exercise his will in carrying out legal actions.

A legal curator (caretaker) would be appointed for a person judged mentally incompetent to manage his own affairs. When an adult of limited mental capacity was named as an heir to an estate, the bequest likewise would include the appointment of a curator or guardian, just as a guardian would be arranged for underage children. The practice of assuring caretaking (cura) was as old as the Twelve Tables (mid-5th century BC), when it was assumed to be a responsibility of the family. During the early Imperial period, a person who thought they might be dealing with a furiosus could ask a praetor or provincial governor to investigate, affirm the diagnosis, and appoint a curator.

Because Roman society was patriarchal, a head of household (paterfamilias) who was furiosus put the family at particular risk of destabilization, calling for the urgent appointment of a curator. A father might be immoral or irresponsible without losing his patria potestas (legal power as a father to govern his household), but a curator would be appointed to take over his affairs only if he was deemed furiosus, intellectually incapable of adult reasoning as equated with a child under age seven.

Augustus, the first and longest-reigning Roman emperor, even appointed a special procurator for Archelaus, client king of Cappadocia, during a time when he was struggling with physical and mental illness. Archelaus outlived Augustus, whose successor Tiberius accused the king of "rebellious conduct" and of feigning insanity to avoid execution; when the king's mental incompetence was demonstrated, he was spared the death penalty.

=== Military law ===
In military law, early discharge (missio causaria), as distinguished from either a dishonorable or honorable discharge, could be granted to a soldier for a physical or mental disability. Two or three physicians (medici) each conducted an independent examination, and the decision was made by a judge with competence in this area. Extant documents for early discharge happen to cite only physical infirmities, though Roman jurists discuss cases of mental illness.

Suicide to avoid captivity or enslavement by the enemy was regarded as honorable, but a suicide attempt in the normal course of service was considered a form of treason, punishable—with "somewhat peculiar logic"—by death. Legal texts list six extenuating circumstances for suicide attempts that could result in a dishonorable discharge rather than execution: inpatientia doloris (unbearable pain), morbus (physical or mental illness), luctus (sorrow or grief), taedium vitae (weariness of life), furor (madness), and pudor (shame). Similar extenuating circumstances could be taken into account in a charge of treason arising from self-mutilation for the purpose of evading or escaping military service, for instance cutting off a thumb.
