= Brain fever =

Former name of medical conditions producing fever

Brain fever (or cerebral fever) is an outdated medical term that was used as a synonym for phrensy, beginning in early 19th century medical literature. Supposedly the brain becomes inflamed and causes a variety of symptoms, most notably mental confusion, and can lead to death. The terminology is romanticized in Victorian literature, where it typically describes a potentially life-threatening illness brought about by a severe emotional upset, and much less often fatal than in medicine.

== Conditions and signs ==
Brain fever is a diagnosis that became obsolete as knowledge of microbiology and contagion increased. Many symptoms and post-mortem evidence is consistent with some forms of encephalitis or meningitis. Other cases were likely the result of emotional trauma, a diagnosis particularly common if the patient was a woman. Audrey C. Peterson explains that 18th-century medicine often used "fever" to mean "disease", not necessarily a raised body temperature. For phrenitis, the disease brain fever is a synonym, for the seat of that disease was the brain, and Robert James classified it as "the most dangerous kind of inflammation," which could lead to delirium. Later scholars distinguished between a fever that affected parts of the brain or the whole, but William Cullen denied the existence of such a differentiation on the basis of "observation and dissection". Phrenitis was classified by the end of the 18th century as a disease, and "brain fever" had become a common synonym by the mid-19th century. However, at the same time as it became popular in literature, phrenitis was being noted as anachronistic or obsolete. Medical literature saw that pathological cases were reduced to a version of meningitis. By the early 20th century it was absent from medical literature, with symptoms and cases linked to different pathologies and psychologies, mostly meningo-encephalitis.

Symptoms described in the literature included headache, red eyes and face, impatience and irritability, a quickened pulse, moaning and screaming, convulsions followed by relaxation, and delirium. Peterson notes that while sometimes an instance of brain fever was said to come gradually, "more often the attack was described as coming on abruptly, a feature which is especially significant for the writers of fiction". Absent knowledge of bacterial causes of disease, medical scientists did recognize epidemic occurrences of brain fever, but considered them caused by "matters floating in the atmosphere". As with all fevers of the time, emotional and psychological causes were frequently cited as well, including fear, lack of sleep, mental exertion, and disappointment. People leading sedentary lifestyles (like those who study) are particularly vulnerable.

Brain fever is frequently associated also with hysteria, particularly female hysteria, as in the case of Catherine Linton in Emily Brontë's Wuthering Heights (1847).

Ioana Boghian used the term as a synonym for hysteria in a semiotic analysis of Victorian conceptions of illness, which were viewed, she argues, as somatic symptom disorders; they are "disorders ...characterized by physical complaints that appear to be medical in origin but that can not be explained in terms of a physical disease, the results of substance abuse, or by an other mental disorder." These "physical symptoms must be serious enough to interfere with the patient's employment or relationships, and must be symptoms that are not under the patient's voluntary control."

== Examples in literature ==
- A notable early victim is Catherine Linton in Emily Brontë's Wuthering Heights (1847).
- Emma Bovary (in Gustave Flaubert's Madame Bovary, 1857) has an attack of brain fever lasting 43 days after her lover leaves her.
- Lucy Feverel (in George Meredith 's The Ordeal of Richard Feverel, 1859) suffers "cerebral fever" after not being allowed to see her wounded lover; she is ill for five days and then dies.
- Two references from the time of the American Civil War are found among two American authors who also worked as nurses during the war. In The Wound Dresser, Walt Whitman describes a young man who died of brain fever. Louisa May Alcott describes her own case of brain fever in 1860, in a letter to her sister, the same illness that is suffered by the Periwinkle character in her Hospital Sketches (1863).
- In Elizabeth Gaskell's novel Cousin Phillis (1863–1864), the main female character Phillis Holman has a sudden attack of brain fever upon hearing that her lover has married someone else. According to Clare Pettitt, the scene where Holman has her illness serves two purposes. First, it indicates to which extent the men in her life have let her down and failed to diagnose her condition properly, and how they have denied her a subjectivity. Second, it shows that becoming a subject in that environment requires a pathology; there are no other ways for a woman to express selfhood: "Gaskell uses her representation of Phillis to illustrate the pathologization of women by a mid-nineteenth-century society that, literally, makes them ill." Jeni Curtis argues that her wordlessness during her bout of fever is a breakdown of language: her "moans and wordless noises" are an attempt to hold on to the Symbolic.
- Arthur Conan Doyle describes several different characters in various Sherlock Holmes stories as suffering from brain fever:
  - In "The Naval Treaty", Percy Phelps, an old schoolmate of Dr. Watson, becomes distraught after losing important diplomatic papers. He becomes so upset that, while travelling home after leaving the case with the police, he reports becoming "practically a raving maniac". Phelps lies "for over nine weeks, unconscious, and raving mad with brain fever" before recovering enough to send for the assistance of Holmes.
  - In "The Adventure of the Copper Beeches", Holmes is consulted by a governess hired on the condition that she get her hair cut short, and eventually discovers that her employer took her on so that she could impersonate his daughter, who was in the early stages of recovery from brain fever, the Victorian treatment for which was to shave the head so that various treatments could be applied near the brain.
  - In "The Adventure of the Crooked Man", Holmes is called in to solve the apparent murder of a colonel whose wife is not available as a witness because she has developed brain fever.
  - In "The Adventure of the Cardboard Box", a woman develops brain fever after learning that her sister has received a box containing two severed ears in the mail.
  - In "The Adventure of the Musgrave Ritual", a maid has brain fever after being jilted by her lover.
- In Bram Stoker's Dracula, Jonathan Harker develops brain fever after escaping from the Count.
- Brain fever is mentioned in Dostoyevsky's The Brothers Karamazov, which manifests itself into Ivan's nightmare of the devil: "Anticipating events I can say at least one thing: he was at that moment on the very eve of an attack of brain fever. Though his health had long been affected, it had offered a stubborn resistance to the fever which in the end gained complete mastery over it."
- The Indian Gentleman, Mr Carrisford, in Frances Hodgson Burnett's A Little Princess, and Captain Crewe, Sara's father, both experience brain fever when they think their investments in the diamond mines have become worthless.
- In The Way of All Flesh by Samuel Butler, Ernest develops brain fever after being sent to prison for sexual assault.

== See also ==
- Brain-fever bird (common hawk-cuckoo, Cuculus varius), so called from its call
- Nervous breakdown
