= Inheritance law in ancient Rome =

In ancient Rome, inheritance law was governed by the civil law (ius civile) of the Twelve Tables and the laws passed by the Roman assemblies, which tended to be very strict, and law of the praetor (ius honorarium, i.e. case law), which was often more flexible. The resulting system was extremely complicated and was one of the central concerns of the Roman legal system. Discussion of the laws of inheritance take up eleven of the fifty books in the Digest. 60-70% of all Roman litigation was concerned with inheritance.

In the case of intestacy, Roman inheritance law had no concept of primogeniture and treated male and female children equally. However, in most cases intestacy was avoided by means of a will. Roman law recognised very broad freedom of testation, but wills had to strictly follow correct formulae and phrases in order to be valid. The will had to name an heir. In addition to this, it could name a legal guardian (tutor) for underage children, manumit slaves, and leave legacies to third parties. Over time a separate system of fideicommissa ("trusts"), which allowed greater flexibility, developed alongside the system of wills.

== Intestacy ==
Intestacy occurred when someone died without any will or when they died with a will that was subsequently found to be invalid. The civil law on intestacy was laid down in the Twelve Tables. Property went first to sui heredes ("his own heirs"), who were any children of the deceased that had remained under his patria potestas ("paternal power") until his death. There was no assumption of primogeniture - all children, male and female, received an equal share of the estate. If there were no children, then agnate relatives in the male line would inherit (i.e. other children of the deceased's father, paternal grandfather, and so on). If there were none of these, then the Twelve Tables provided for the property to be inherited by the wider gens, but as the social role of the gens declined after the Early Republican period, this ceased to occur. There was no concept that an intestate property might pass to the state. Children of the deceased who had been emancipated before the deceased's death or who had passed into the potestas of another (through certain kinds of marriage or through adoption by another) were excluded from the succession, as were relatives in the female line (i.e. relatives of the deceased's mother), and the deceased's spouse.

This system was altered by the law of the praetor, so that all children, including emancipated children, inherited in first instance, then agnate relatives in the male line, then relatives in the male or female line based according to six degrees of proximity, and finally the widow of the deceased (excluded because she was assumed to form part of her father's inheritance, not her husband's). If any of these people had already received a portion of the estate during the lifetime of the deceased (e.g. as a dowry), that amount would be subtracted from their share of the estate. Mothers of at least three children were given a right to inherit from their children by the senatus consultum Tertullianum. Legitimate and illegitimate children were made the presumed heirs of their mothers by the senatus consultum Orfitianum.

In Late Antiquity, Justinian abolished this system in two rulings delivered in AD 543 and 548, in favour of a system where property of the deceased went to the descendants in first instance, then to ascendants and siblings, and then to more distant relatives, with no distinction between the male and female line and no right to succession on the part of the widow.

== Testamentary succession ==
Most Roman inheritances were not intestate. Instead, they were governed by a will (testamentum). Some Roman writers speak of producing a will as a duty (officium). Henry Maine in 1861 characterised the Roman approach as a "horror of intestacy." Only a pater familias (male head of household) could make a will that disposed of a whole estate. But any Roman citizen who had reached the age of majority could make a will for property that they possessed in their own right. Women could make wills through a process of fictional sale (coemptio), until the reign of Hadrian, when they were given the ability to make a will through their tutor (legal guardian). Non-Romans (peregrini) and people with intellectual disabilities could not make wills under Roman law. Exiles were not allowed to make wills either and this ban was retrospective; being sent into exile voided any will that the exile had already made.

The will had to name an heir. In addition to this, it could name a legal guardian (tutor) for underage children, manumit slaves, and leave legacies to third parties.

=== Early methods of testament ===
The earliest form of Roman will was made at an assembly of the people called the comitia calata ("summoned assembly") which was held twice a year. Soldiers could also make a will before they went into battle, called an in procinctu ("with togas girded up"). Both of these methods had ceased to be used by the Late Republic.

They were replaced by the testamentum per aes et libram ("the will made by bronze and scales"). This form of will rested on the legal fiction that the testator was formally conveying (mancipatio) his property to a trustee (familiae emptor, "buyer of the household") who would then convey it to the chosen heirs on his death. The act of conveyance had to be witnessed by a scale-bearer (libripens) and five other witnesses . Initially, the will was made orally, but written wills became common early. By the Late Republic, the actual ceremony was no longer carried out, although the term was still being used in the second century AD. From the second century BC, all that was required was a written will sealed by seven witnesses (signatores).

=== Documentation ===
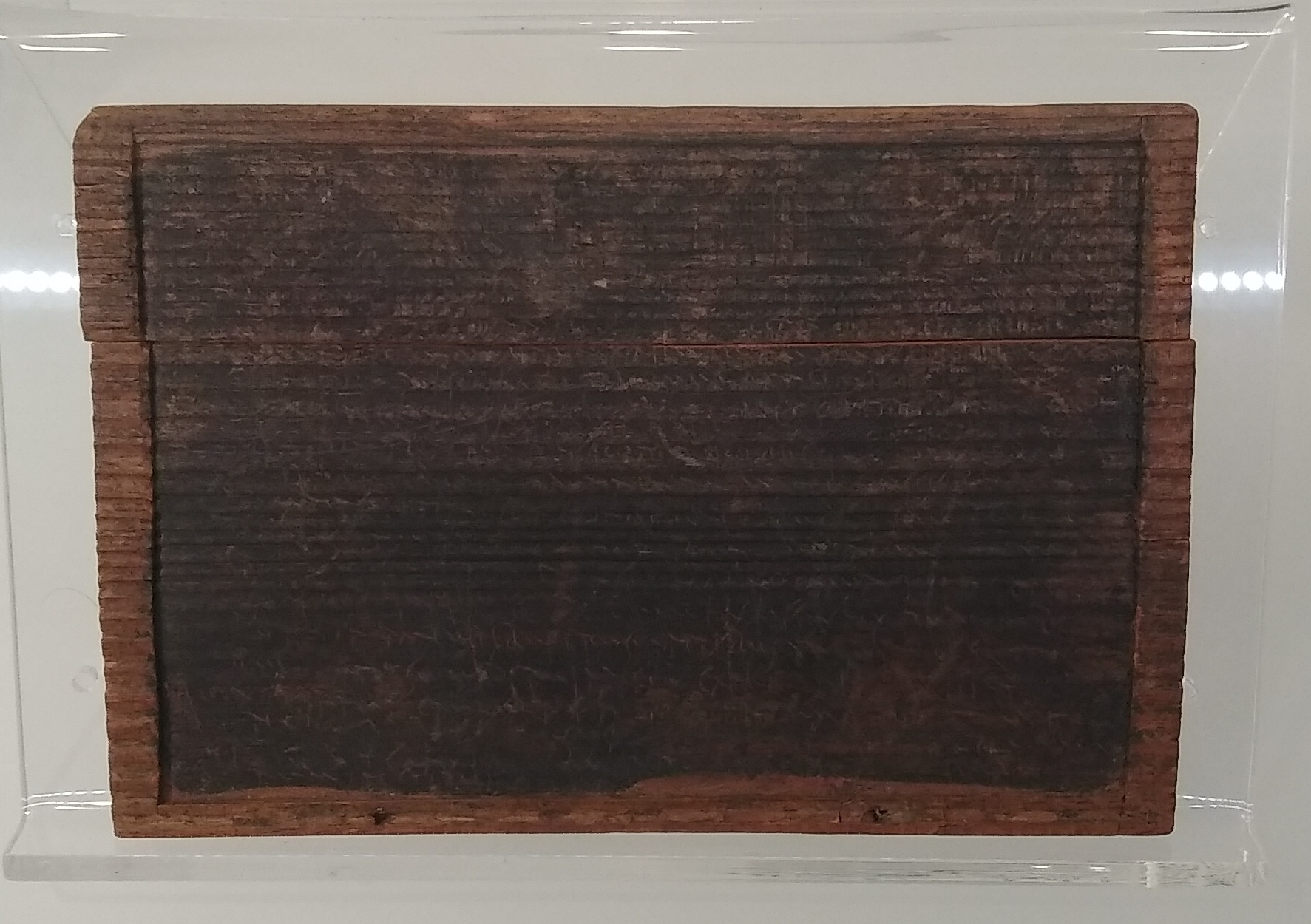
Wax tablet with part of a Roman will, found in Wales

Wills usually took the form of three wooden writing tablets (tabulae). One surface of each was covered with wax and a copy of the will was written on two of the tablets. The tablets were tied together, so that one copy was visible (scriptura exterior) and the other was not (scriptura interior). The seals of the witnesses were placed over the cord, so that it was impossible to open the tablet and view the inner copy without breaking the seals. This design was intended as a guarantee against tampering. This form was mandated by the senatus consultum Neronianum of AD 61, but it was probably the usual form before that.

=== Designating heirs ===
To be valid, a will had to name an heir or heirs (heres or heredes). These could be designated using the phrases "Be thou, so-and-so my heir" or "I order that so-and-so be my heir" (Titius heres esto or Titium heredem esse iubeo). Any other phrase, like "I wish that so-and-so be my heir" or "I make so-and-so my heir" (Titium heredem esse volo or Titium heredem facio), would not be valid.

If there was no valid heir then the whole will would fail, including legacies left to people other than the heir. Under the principle of universalis successio ("total inheritance"), the heir inherited all rights and obligations of the deceased, including all their debts. Thus, becoming heir to a heavily indebted estate could lead to bankruptcy. Most people were granted a hundred days to consider whether to accept the role of heir. But children who had not been emancipated before death (sui heredes) and slaves who were simultaneously freed and appointed heir in the will could not refuse the role.

Under the civil law, there was an assumption that all children of the deceased were heirs unless the testator specifically disinherited them (by name for male children, by general statement for female children). Under the praetor's law, this rule was extended to emancipated sons. Sometimes a testator would disinherit their children in order to avoid them becoming liable for any debts and then require the named heir to pass the property to the children through a fideicommissum.

The will could also name substitute heirs, who would take over the role of the heir if the initial heir died before the testator or refused to accept the will.

Justinian introduced a rule called "the privilege of inventory" (beneficium inventarii), according to which, if an heir began making an inventory of the estate within thirty days of learning that they were the named heir, then they would only be liable for debts from items contained in the inventory.

Under the civil law, the heir claimed the estate through a hereditatis petitio ("claim of heirdom"). The praetor's law provided an alternative, the bonorum possessio ("order for possession of the estate"), where the heir was determined by the ruling of a magistrate. This ruling might be secundum tabulas ("in accordance with the will") or contra tabulas ("contrary to the will"). These two systems were very complicated, leading to efforts to simplify them and, eventually, they were merged.

==== Invalid heirs ====
Heirs had to be specific natural persons. It was impossible under Roman law to make a community, state, trust, or company the heir. The heir could not be any "unknown person" (incerta persona), e.g. a child who had not been born when the will was written.

Foreigners (peregrini) could not be named as heirs.

Under the Lex Julia de maritandis ordinibus of 18 BC and the Lex Papia Poppaea of AD 9, unmarried adults could not inherit or receive legacies and married adults without children could only receive half the inheritance.

=== Manumissions ===
Originally, the testator was able to manumit any number of slaves in the will. Under Augustus, the Lex Fufia Caninia of 2 BC placed an absolute maximum limit of one hundred manumissions and lower limits for estates which had smaller numbers of slaves. The motivation for this may have been a desire to limit the number of freedmen and/or to prevent the testator from bankrupting the estate. Somewhere between 5% and 8% of all Roman manumissions were testamentary manumissions.

=== Legacies ===
The testator could leave legacies to third parties, which the heir was obliged to pay from the estate. Legacies could provide a method for leaving property to people who could not legally be heir, but foreigners, communities, and uncertain persons could not be legatees either. Unlike the heir, legatees were not liable for the estates debts. Legacies could be per vindicationem ("by claim"), where the legatee became owner of the property in question, or per damnationem ("by obligation"), where the heir was required to make a regular payment to the legatee from the property. A legacy was only valid if the phrase "to whom I give and legate" (cui do lego).

Legacies could include dowries, money given to slaves (peculium), furniture, wine, and so on. Annuities might be granted to servants of the deceased, to be paid on a certain day each year for the rest of the servant's life. A lifetime usufruct of a property was often granted to the widow of the deceased. Legacies were often used to leave money to towns or associations for specific purposes (e.g., holding games in honour of the deceased, constructing public buildings, providing heating for the bathhouse or oil for the gymnasium.

Under the Lex Falcidia of 40 BC, legacies could not take up more than three-quarters of the total estate (i.e. the heirs had to receive at least a quarter). If the legacies were more than this amount, then they would be reduced in order to ensure that the heirs received a quarter of the total value of the estate.

Justinian merged legacies into the system of fideicommissa discussed below.

=== Challenging the will ===
Under the Twelve Tables, testators had complete freedom of testation. In the Late Republic, children could file a "complaint of the undutiful will" (querela inofficiosi testamenti) before the centumviral court, if the will gave them less than one quarter of what they would have gotten in the event of intestacy and there was no reason why they had been excluded. The heirs would have to demonstrate that they had always behaved in a dutiful manner towards the deceased. If they won the case, they got the full share that they would have received in case of intestacy. This was based on the legal fiction that the testator could not have been of sound mind when that part of the will was written. The claim only voided the specific section of the will dealing with the claimant, not the whole will. The law mostly did not specify what were valid reasons for disinheriting someone. Thus, it was generally determined by the social expectations of the jury. Fourth-century laws mention "immorality" and becoming a gladiator as reasons and Justinian provided a full list in AD 542.

Even when a disinheritance was totally legal, there was strong social pressure against disinheriting children and direct descendants.

== Fideicommissum ==
The fideicommissum ("trust") was an alternative method for leaving legacies instead of the will. It could consist of a specific object or property or of the whole estate. Originally, it was a gift of some property to an individual who was requested to use it for a specific purpose, but was not legally bound to do so. Under Augustus, some fideicommissa became legally binding, being enforced by the consuls. Claudius created two praetores fideicommissarii who were specifically responsible for enforcing fideicommissa (later they were reduced to one).

Fideicommissa differed from legacies in several ways. Firstly, the trustee could be anyone who received something from the estate, not just the heir. Secondly, the fideicommissum could benefit someone who was not a valid heir. This loophole was closed over time. For example, the Senatus consultum Pegasianum of AD 73 prevented fideicommissa for unmarried and childless individuals. Thirdly, whereas legacies failed if there was no heir or the will was invalid, fideicommissa still functioned, as long as the trustee benefitted from the estate - even in the case of intestacy. Fourthly, whereas wills had to use specific phrases in order to be valid, fideicommissa did not; they were much more flexible. Thus, when wills proved to be invalid, jurists and judges would often try to fulfill the terms of the invalid will under the legal fiction that the testator had intended to create a fideicommissum.

The fideicommissum could be given to the trustee to hold for their lifetime and then pass to a third party at death. For example, the property might be entrusted to the widow, who could use it for the rest of her life, and then would be required to pass it to the main heirs of the estate on her death.

The fideicommissum could also be used by the testator to bind people to use the property in certain ways. For example, Quintus Cervidius Scaevola describes a father who made his son the trustee of his estate, with the ultimate beneficiaries being the son's own heirs, and a stipulation banning the son from selling or mortgaging the land. This seems to have been rare in practice. Justinian banned any such arrangement which lasted more than four generations.

== See also ==
- Inheritance law
- Roman law

== Bibliography ==
- Champlin, E. (1991). Final Judgments: duty and emotion in Roman wills, 200 B.C.–A.D. 250. Princeton.
- Crook, J. A. (1967). Law and life of Rome: 90 B.C.–A.D.212. Ithaca.
- Crook, J. (1973). "Intestacy in Roman Society". Proceedings of the Cambridge Philological Society. 19: 38–44. doi:10.1017/S006867350000359X. S2CID 159482221.
- Frier, B. W.; McGinn, T. A. J. (2004). A casebook on Roman family law. Oxford.
- Giodice Sabbatelli, V. (2001). Fideicommissorum persecutio: contributo allo studio delle cognizioni straordinarie. Bari.
- Impallomeni, G. (1963). Le manomissioni mortis causa: studi sulle fonti autoritative romane. Padua.
- Jakab, Eva (2016). "Inheritance". In du Plessis, Paul J. (ed.). The Oxford handbook of Roman law and society. Oxford, United Kingdom: Oxford University Press. pp. 498–510. doi:10.1093/oxfordhb/9780198728689.013.38. ISBN 9780198728689.
- Johnston, D. (1988). The Roman Law of Trusts. Oxford.
- Johnston, David (2015). "Succession". In Johnston, David (ed.). The Cambridge Companion to Roman Law. Cambridge University Press. pp. 199–212. doi:10.1017/CCO9781139034401.015. ISBN 978-0-521-89564-4.
- Müller-Ehlen, M. (1998). Hereditatis petitio. Cologne, Weimar, Vienna.
- Rüfner, T. (2011). "Testamentary formalities in Roman law". In Reid, K. G. C.; de Waal, M. J.; Zimmermann, R. (eds.). Comparative succession law, I: Testamentary formalities. Oxford. pp. 1–26.
- Saller, R. (1994). Patriarchy, Property and Death in the Roman Family. Cambridge: Cambridge University Press.
- Tellegen, J. W. (1982). The Roman Law of Succession in the Letters of Pliny the Younger. Zutphen.
- Voci, P. (1963–1967). Diritto ereditario romano. Florence.
- Watson, A. (1971). The Law of Succession in the Later Roman Republic. Oxford.
- Zimmermann, R. (2007). "Compulsory Heirship in Roman Law". In Reid, K. G. C.; de Waal, M. J.; Zimmermann, R. (eds.). Exploring the Law of Succession: Studies National, Historical and Comparative. Edinburgh. pp. 27–48. ISBN 9780748632909. JSTOR 10.3366/j.ctt1r2553.
