= Quebec Act =

Act of the Parliament of Great Britain setting up Quebec as part of the British Empire

Quebec Act 1774
- Act of Parliament
- Parliament of Great Britain
- Long title: An Act for making more effectual Provision for the Government of the Province of Quebec in North America.
- Citation: 14 Geo. 3. c. 83
- Territorial extent: Great Britain; Province of Quebec

Dates
- Royal assent: 22 June 1774
- Commencement: 13 January 1774 (Note: Start of session.)
- Repealed: 10 August 1790
Other legislation
Amended by	Statute Law Revision Act 1871; Statute Law Revision Act 1872; Statute Law Revision Act 1888
Repealed by	Constitutional Act 1791
Relates to	Coercive Acts

Status: Repealed

Text of statute as originally enacted

The Quebec Act 1774 (14 Geo. 3. c. 83) (French: Acte de Québec de 1774) was an act of the Parliament of Great Britain which set procedures of governance in the Province of Quebec. One of the principal components of the act was the expansion of the province's territory to take over part of the Indian Reserve, including much of what is now southern Ontario, Illinois, Indiana, Michigan, Ohio, Wisconsin, and parts of Minnesota.

The act removed the reference to the Protestant faith from the oath of allegiance, and guaranteed free practice of Catholicism and restored the Church's power to impose tithes. Additionally, it restored the use of the French civil law for matters of private law, except for the granting of unlimited freedom of testation in accordance with English common law; which was maintained for matters of public law, including administrative appeals, court procedure, and criminal prosecution.

In Quebec, English-speaking immigrants from the Thirteen Colonies fiercely objected to a variety of its provisions, which they saw as a removal of certain political freedoms. The act was one of the many catalysts that led to the American Revolution. Meanwhile, French-speaking Canadiens varied in their reaction, although the land-owning seigneurs and ecclesiastics were generally happy with its provisions.

The act had been passed in the same session of Parliament as a number of other acts designed as punishment for the Boston Tea Party and other protests, which the American Patriots collectively termed the Intolerable Acts or, in England, the Coercive Acts. Moreover, the act was seen by those in the Thirteen Colonies as a new model for administration, which would strip them of their self-elected assemblies, and appeared to void some of the colonies' land claims by granting most of the Ohio Country to the province of Quebec. The residents of the Thirteen Colonies also interpreted the act as an "establishment" of Catholicism in the colony, as many from these colonies had participated in the French and Indian War, and they now saw the religious freedoms and land given to their former enemy as an affront.

== Background ==
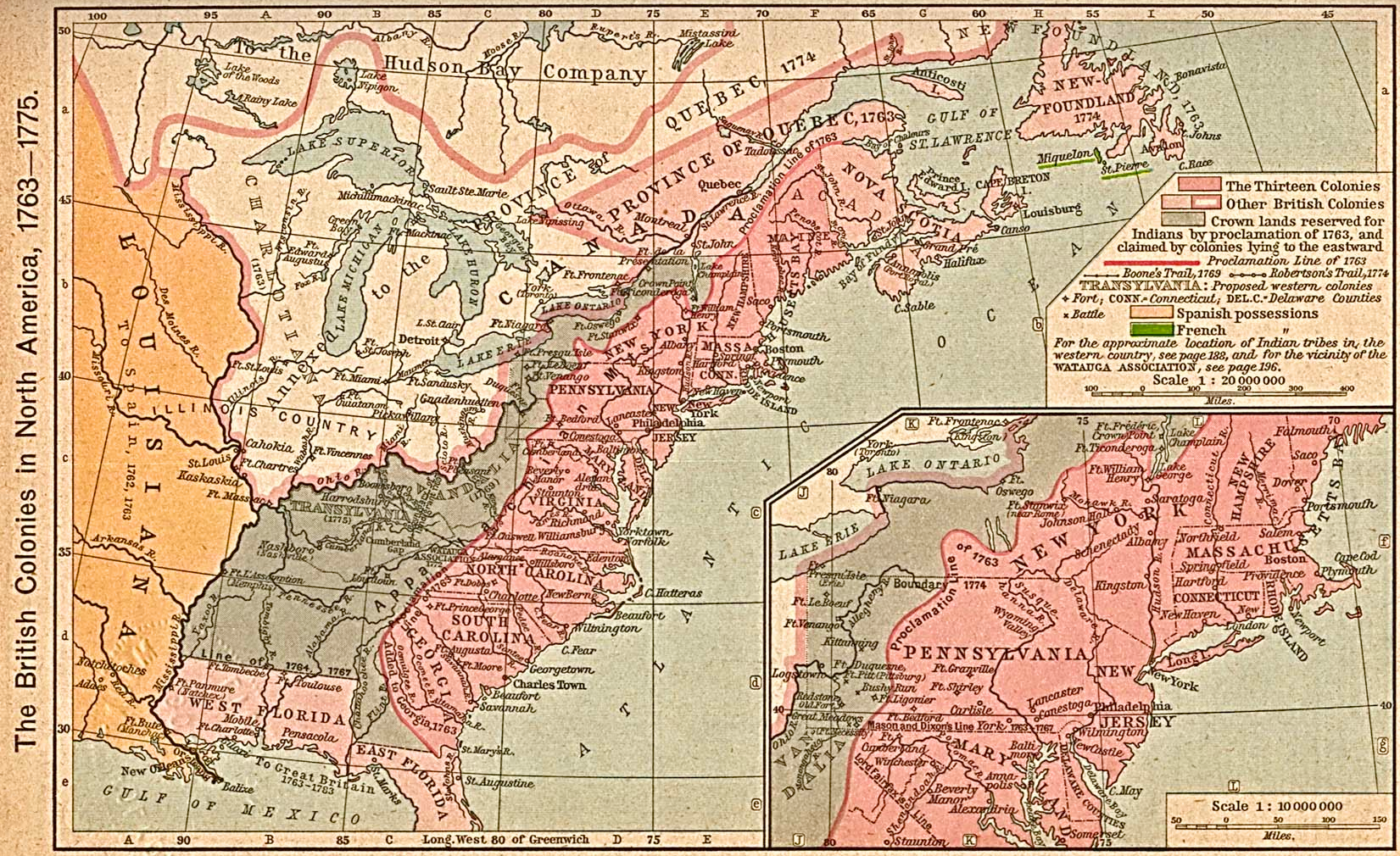
Map of British America showing original boundaries of the Province of Quebec and its Quebec Act post-annexation boundaries. From Historical Atlas by William R. Shepherd, New York, Henry Holt and Company, 1923; the map is unchanged from the 1911 original version.

Following the defeat of the Kingdom of France by the Kingdom of Great Britain in the Seven Years' War, the peace was formalized with the Treaty of Paris of 1763. Under the terms of the treaty, France ceded New France, specifically the French colony of Canada, to Britain as it was considered less valuable, since its only significant commercial product at the time was beaver pelts, choosing instead to keep the islands of Guadeloupe and Martinique for their valuable sugar production. This territory along the St. Lawrence River, called Canada by the French, was renamed Quebec by the British, after its capital city. Non-military administration of the territories acquired by the British in the war was defined in the Royal Proclamation of 1763.

Despite the Treaty of Paris permitting the free exercise of religion for French Catholics, certain restrictions remained under British rule. Under the terms of the peace treaty, Canadiens who chose not to leave became British subjects. In order for them to serve in public offices, they were required to swear an oath to the King that contained specific provisions rejecting the Catholic faith. Given that many of the predominantly Roman Catholic Canadiens were unwilling to take such an oath, this effectively prevented large numbers of Canadiens from participating in the local governments. Furthermore, following the death of Henri-Marie Dubreil de Pontbriand, French Catholics lacked a bishop, as British ecclesiastical policy did not allow for new appointments prior to the passage of the Quebec Act. To temporarily address this leadership gap, vicar generals were appointed, but the absence of a bishop posed challenges for the Catholic community in maintaining religious guidance and governance. These issues extended to Governor James Murray, who faced conflicts in executing his duties in the province. Initially tasked with enforcing Protestantism in Quebec, he was instructed “not to admit of any Ecclesiastical Jurisdiction of the See of Rome, or any other foreign Ecclesiastical Jurisdiction whatsoever in the Province under your Government.” However, during his tenure, Murray’s stance shifted as he began to support the extension of religious rights to Catholics. His successor, Guy Carleton, received similar instructions regarding the enforcement of British ecclesiastical policy. Despite this, Carleton also demonstrated a degree of flexibility, allowing French Catholics to continue their religious practices as they had prior to British rule.

With unrest, which was growing into the American Revolution, increasing in the colonies to the south, the British were worried that the Canadiens might also support the growing rebellion. At that time, Canadiens formed the vast majority of the settler population of the province of Quebec (more than 99%) and there was little immigration from Great Britain. To secure the allegiance of the approximately 90,000 Canadiens to the British crown, Murray adopted his policy of local tolerance, which Carleton later advanced by bringing proposals for formal legal protections before Parliament.

A growing class of British merchants in Quebec "viewed with alarm and disgust the leniency manifested toward the French Canadians." These merchants emerged as vocal opponents of Governor Carleton’s policy of religious tolerance, instead advocating for the establishment of Protestantism as the official religion of the province. The conflict extended to the legislative sphere, where Attorney General Francis Maseres, a representative of the British minority, expressed strong opposition to Catholic influence. He argued that the appointment of a Catholic bishop, Jean-Olivier Briand, in 1766 had reinforced loyalty among French Canadian clergy, preventing their conversion to Protestantism, and criticized the legalization of tithes and the expansion of Quebec’s territory as measures that strengthened "the Popish religion". Maseres became one of Carleton’s main opponents in debates leading to the Quebec Act. Nonetheless, there was a need to compromise between the conflicting demands of the Canadien subjects and those of newly arrived British subjects. These efforts by the colonial governors eventually resulted in the enactment of the Quebec Act, 1774.

== The act ==
- Territory: The boundaries of the province were defined by the act. In addition to the territory defined by the royal proclamation, the borders were expanded to include land that is now southern Ontario, Illinois, Indiana, Michigan, Ohio, Wisconsin and sections of Minnesota. This increased the size of the province threefold, restoring the territory of the French province of Canada.
- Religion: The Act allowed public office holders to practise the Roman Catholic faith, by replacing the oath sworn by officials from one sworn to Elizabeth I and her heirs, with one sworn to George III that had no reference to the Protestant faith. This enabled, for the first time, Canadiens to legally participate in the affairs of the provincial government without formally renouncing their faith. It also re-established the collection of tithes, which had been stopped under the previous administrative rules.
- Structure of government: The Act defined the structure of the provincial government. The governor was to be appointed by the Crown, and he was to govern with the assistance of a legislative council; there were no provisions for an elected legislative assembly.
- Law: The Royal Proclamation of 1763 had provided that English common law would apply for all purposes in the colony. The act restored the application of the former law of Canada for all matters respecting property and civil rights, while providing that English law would apply in matters of public law, criminal law and freedom of testation.
- Land use: The seigneurial system as a means of distributing land and managing its use was restored. This was the system by which the French had administered the province; the British had instituted a township system of land management in 1763.
- Name of the act: as was the practice at that time, the act initially only had a long title: An Act for making more effectual Provision for the Government of the Province of Quebec in North America. The act was customarily referred to as the Quebec Act 1774. In 1898, the British Parliament authorised the use of a short title, the British North America (Quebec) Act 1774, but that short title was "without prejudice to any other mode of citation". In its collection of constitutional enactments, the federal government has continued to refer to the act as the Quebec Act, 1774.

== Legacy ==
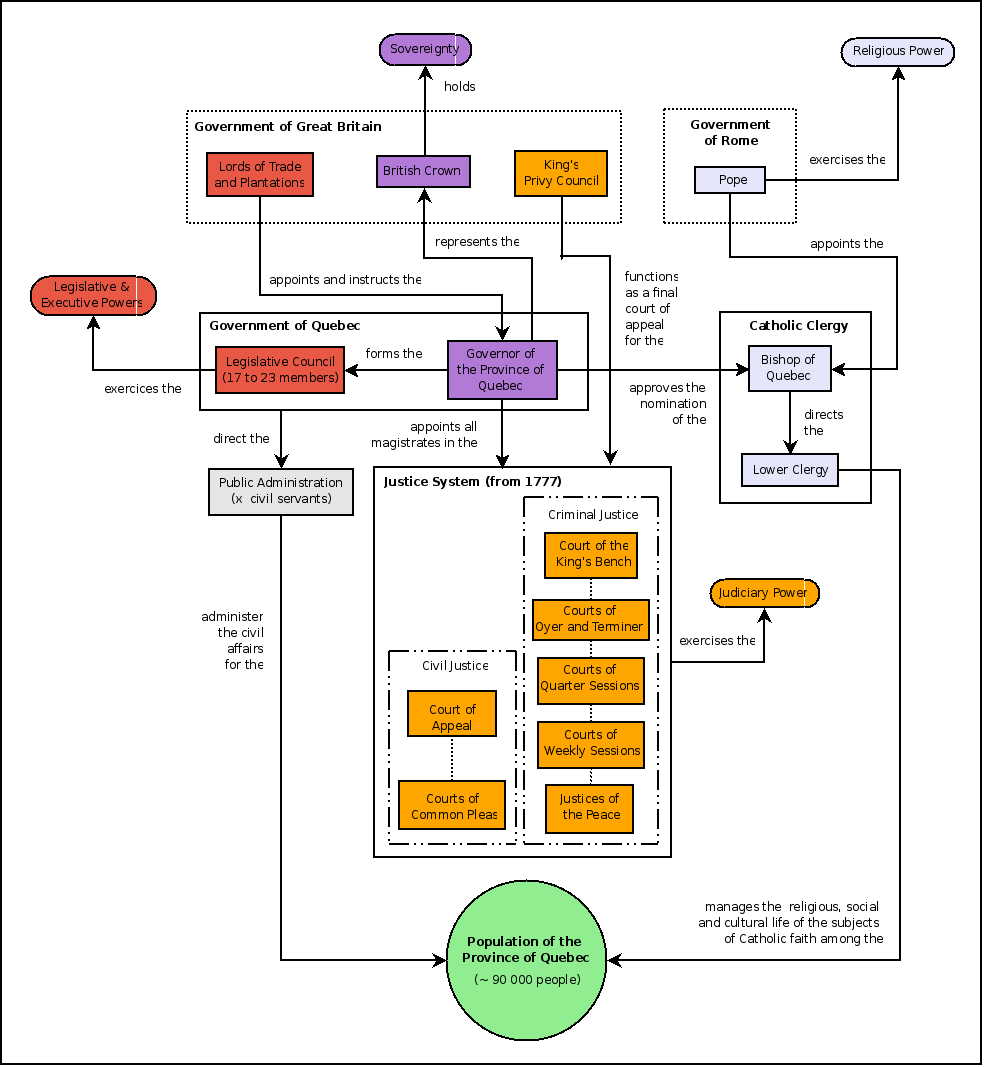
Constitution of the Province of Quebec 1775

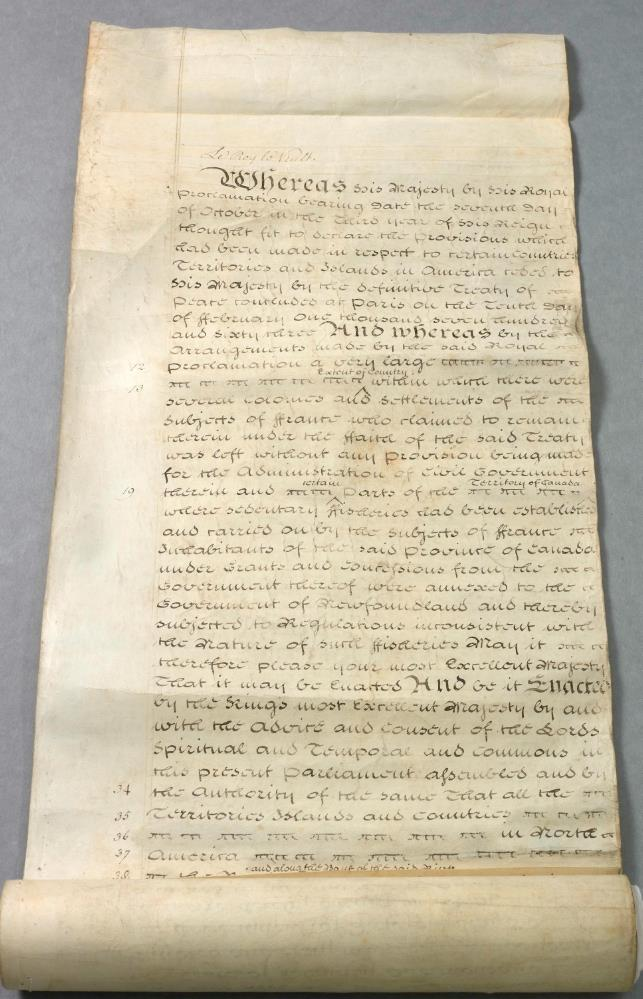
Original manuscript of the Quebec Act (1774), held in the British Parliamentary Archives

=== Participation of the Canadiens ===
The internal communications of the British colonial government at Quebec suggest a relative failure of the purpose of the Quebec Act. On 4 February 1775, Governor Guy Carleton wrote to General Thomas Gage that he believed the Canadiens to be generally happy with the act, yet he also added:

I must not however conceal from Your Excellency, that the Gentry, well disposed, and heartily desirous as they are, to serve the Crown, and to serve it with Zeal, when formed into regular Corps, do not relish commanding a bare Militia, they never were used to that Service under the French Government, (and perhaps for good Reasons) besides the sudden Dismission of the Canadian Regiment raised in 1764, without Gratuity or Recompence to Officers, who engaged in our Service almost immediately after the Cession of the Country, of taking any Notice of them since, tho' they all expected half pay, is still uppermost in their Thoughts, and not likely to encourage their engaging a second Time in the same Way; as to the Habitants or Peasantry, ever since the Civil Authority has been introduced into the Province, the Government of it has hung so loose, and retained so little Power, they have in a Manner emancipated themselves, and it will require Time, and discreet Management likewise, to recall them to their ancient Habits of Obedience and Discipline; considering all the new Ideas they have been acquiring for these ten years past, can it be thought they will be pleased at being suddenly, and without Preparation embodied into a Militia, and marched from their Families, Lands, and Habitations to remote Provinces, and all the Horrors of War, which they have already experienced; It would give appearance of Truth to the Language of our Sons of Sedition, at this very Moment busily employed instilling into their Minds, that the Act was passed merely to serve the present Purposes of Government, and in the full Intention of ruling over them with all the Despotism of their ancient Masters.

On June 7, after having received word of the Battles of Lexington and Concord, as well as the capture of Fort Ticonderoga and Benedict Arnold's subsequent raid on Fort Saint-Jean, he wrote to Colonial Secretary Dartmouth:

The little Force we have in the Province was immediately set in Motion, and ordered to assemble at or near St. John's; The Noblesse of this Neighbourhood were called upon to collect their Inhabitants, in order to defend themselves, the Savages of those Parts likewise had the same orders; but tho' the Gentlemen testified great Zeal, neither their Entreaties or their Example could prevail upon the People; a few of the Gentry, consisting principally of the Youth, residing in this Place, and its Neighbourhood, formed a small Corps of Volunteers under the Command of Mr. Samuel Mackay, and took Post at St. John's; the Indians shewed as much Backwardness as the Canadian Peasantry. ...

Less than a month later, on 28 June 1775, Chief Justice William Hey wrote to the Lord Chancellor from Quebec:

What will be your Lordships astonishment when I tell you that an Act passed for the express purpose of gratifying the Canadians & which was supposed to comprehend all that they either wished or wanted is become the first object of their discontent & dislike. English officers to command them in time of war, & English Laws to govern them in time of Peace, is the general wish. The former they know to be impossible (at least at present) & by the latter if I understand them right, they mean no Laws & no Government whatsoever – in the mean time it may be truly said that Gen. Carleton had taken an ill measure of the influence of the seigneurs & Clergy over the lower order of people whose Principle of conduct founded in fear & the sharpness of authority over them now no longer exercised, is unrestrained, & breaks out in every shape of contempt or detestation of those whom they used to behold with terror & who gave them I believe too many occasions to express it. And they on their parts have been and are too much elated with the advantages they supposed they should derive from the restoration of their old Privileges & customs, & indulged themselves in a way of thinking & talking that gave very just offence, as well to their own People as to the English merchants.

On 21 September 1775, Lieutenant-Governor Cramahé, who governed at Quebec while Carleton was in Montreal, wrote to Dartmouth on the failure to rally the people after word arrived of the impending invasion from the colonies to the south:

My Lord !

I am sorry to transmit to Your Lordship the disagreeable account of a disagreeable Business, some time in the Beginning of this Month, upon news of the Rebel Army approaching, General Carleton set out for Montreal in great Haste; the 7th instant the Rebels landed in the Woods near St. John's, and beat back to their Boats by a Party of Savages incamped at that Place; in this Action the Savages behaved with great Spirit and Resolution, and had they remained firm to our Interests, probably the Province would have been safe for this Year, but finding the Canadians in General averse to the taking up Arms for the Defence of their Country, they withdrew, and made their Peace.

After their Defeat the Rebels retired to the Isle aux Noix, where they continued till lately, sending out some Parties, and many Emissaries, to debauch the Minds of the Canadians and Indians, in which they have proved too successful, and for which they were too well prepared by the Cabals and Intrigues of these two last years; We knew of their being reinforced, and very considerably, I suppose, as they appeared in Numbers near St. John's last Sunday Evening; where or when they landed, or the Particulars since, we have but very imperfect Accounts of, all Communications with the Forts of St. John's and Chambli, being, as far as I can find, entirely cut off.

No Means have been left untried to bring the Canadian Peasantry to a Sense of their Duty, and engage them to take up arms in Defence of the Province, but all to no Purpose. The Justice must be done to the Gentry, Clergy, and most of the Bourgeoisie, that they have shewen the greatest Zeal and Fidelity to the King's Service, and exerted their best endeavours to reclaim their infatuated Countrymen; ...

=== Thirteen Colonies ===
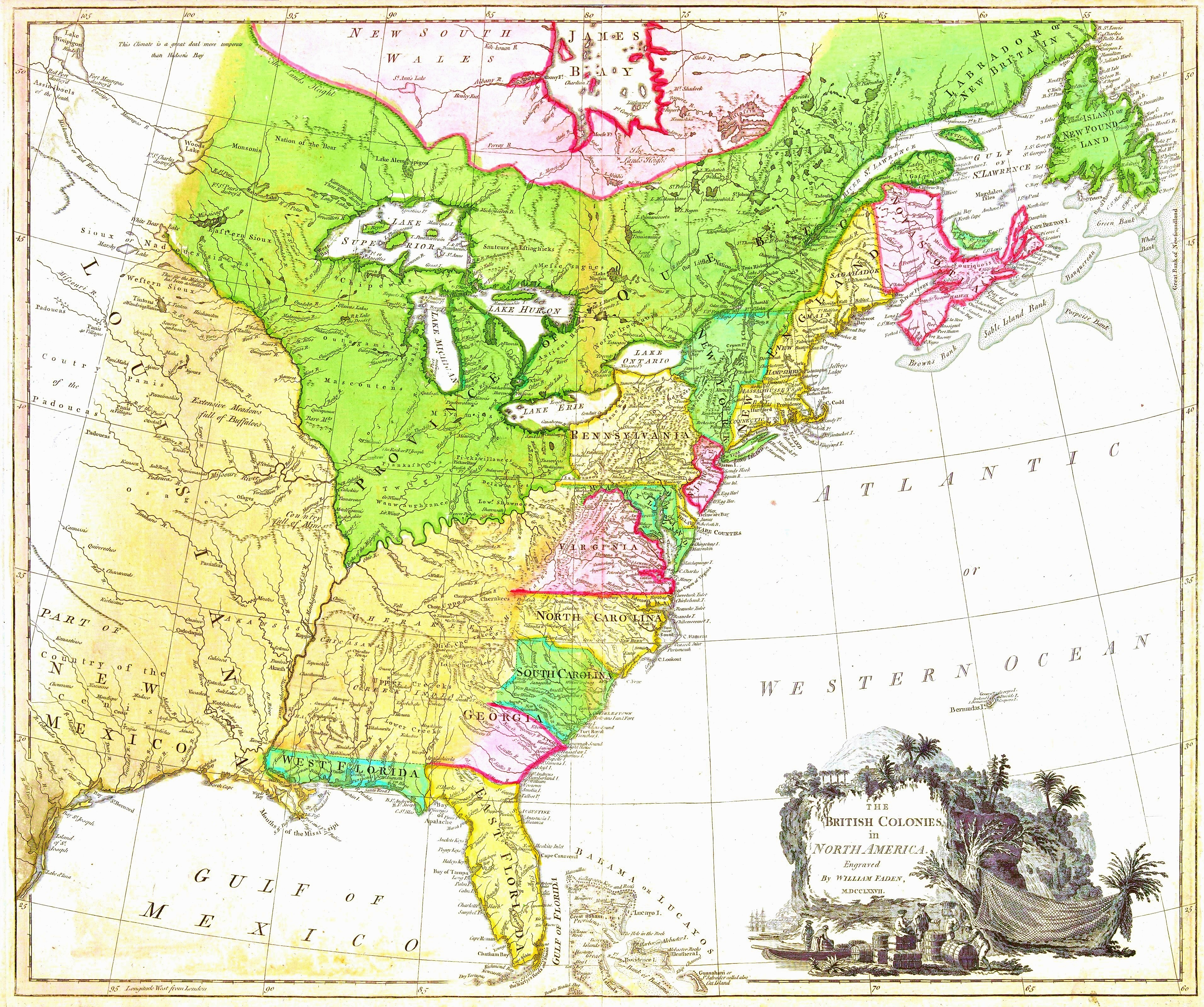
The British colonies in North America. Engraved and published by Royal Geographer William Faden in 1777.

The Quebec Act angered some Americans. Along with four punitive acts passed in the same parliamentary session (called the Coercive Acts in England), it was termed one of the Intolerable Acts by the Patriots, and contributed to the development and threat of the Americans, and their revolution.

Frontiersmen from Virginia and other colonies were already entering the areas that the act transferred to Quebec. Land development companies such as the Ohio Company had already been formed to acquire ownership of large tracts and sell land to settlers and trade with the Indians. Americans denounced the act for promoting the growth of "Papism" (Catholicism) and cutting back on their freedom and traditional rights. In particular, the colonial governments of New York, Pennsylvania and Virginia were angered by the unilateral assignment of the Ohio lands to Quebec, which had each been granted them in their royal charters. The George Rex protest flag was created in New York as a result.

Langston (2005) looked at press reaction in New England. Some colonial editors explained their views on how it reorganized Canadian governance, explaining how they felt it established direct rule by the Crown and limiting the reach of English law to criminal jurisprudence. Isaiah Thomas of the Massachusetts Spy drew links between the Quebec Act and legislation circumscribing American liberties, such as the Tea Act and the Coercive Acts. Editors shaped public opinion by writing editorials and reprinting opposition letters from both sides of the Atlantic. The First Continental Congress, which met from 5 September to 26 October 1774, addressed the inhabitants of Quebec, warning them of the perils of the supposedly arbitrary and tyrannical nature of Parliament.

The Quebec Act's main significance in the Thirteen Colonies was that it angered the Patriots, and dismayed the Loyalists who supported the Crown, and helped to accelerate the confrontation that became the American Revolution. The act is listed as one of the rebels' 27 colonial grievances in the Declaration of Independence:

For abolishing the free System of English Laws in a neighbouring Province, establishing therein an Arbitrary government, and enlarging its Boundaries so as to render it at once an example and fit instrument for introducing the same absolute rule into these Colonies.

The First Continental Congress petitioned Parliament to repeal the Intolerable Acts, which Parliament declined to do. Instead, in February 1775 Parliament passed the Conciliatory Resolution in an attempt to curry favour with the angry colonists. This was too little, too late, as the war broke out before news of its passage could reach the colonies. Although the Continental Congress did eventually receive this proposal, they ultimately rejected it.

In Quebec, the 1774 act was effectively superseded by the Constitutional Act 1791, which partitioned Quebec into two new provinces, Upper and Lower Canada.

The Quebec Act 1774 is an important predecessor to the First Amendment to the Constitution of the United States by establishing religious freedom.

== Subsequent developments ==
Sections 12–16 of the act were repealed by section 1 of, and the schedule to, the Statute Law Revision Act 1871 (34 & 35 Vict. c. 116), which came into force on 21 August 1871.

== See also ==
- Constitutional history of Canada
- Timeline of Quebec history
- History of Ontario
- History of Canada
- American Revolution

== Bibliography ==
- Coupland, Reginald (1925). The Quebec Act: A Study in Statemanship. Oxford: Clarendon Press. pp. s.
- Langston, Paul (2006). "'Tyrant and Oppressor!' Colonial Press Reaction to the Quebec Act". Historical Journal of Massachusetts. 34 (1): 1–17.
- Lawson, Philip (1991). "'Sapped by Corruption': British Governance of Quebec and the Breakdown of Anglo-American Relations on the Eve of Revolution". Canadian Review of American Studies. 22 (3): 301–323 – via Ebsco.
- Metzger, Charles Henry (1936). "The Quebec act; a primary cause of the American revolution". American Catholic Studies. New York: American Catholic Historical Society.
- Miller, John C. (1943). Origins of the American Revolution.
- Creviston, Vernon P. (2011). "'No King unless it be a Constitutional King': Rethinking the Place of the Quebec Act in the Coming of the American Revolution". Historian. 73 (3). s: 463–479.
- Mills, Frederick V. (September 2024). "Liberty and Loyalty: The Canadian Experience and the Transformation of British Ecclesiastical Policy, 1759–1774". Anglican and Episcopal History. 93 (3): 597–633.
- Marie, Eugene (September 1944). "THE QUEBEC ACT LEADS TO CATHOLIC EMANCIPATION IN ENGLISH-SPEAKING COUNTRIES". Records of the American Catholic Historical Society of Philadelphia. 55 (3): 226–245. Archived from the original on 29 April 2025.

=== Primary sources ===
- Cavendish, Sir Henry (1839). Debates of the House of Commons in the Year 1774 on the Bill for Making More Effectual Provision for the Government of the Province of Quebec: Drawn Up from the Notes of the Henry Cavendish, Member for Lostwithiel, London: Ridgway, 303 pp. (online)
- Shortt, Adam; Doughty, Arthur G., eds. (1918). Documents relating to the constitutional history of Canada 1759–1791 (2nd ed.). Archived from the original on 8 February 2022.
