= The Adventure of the Naval Treaty =

Short story by Arthur Conan Doyle featuring Sherlock Holmes

- Short story by Arthur Conan Doyle
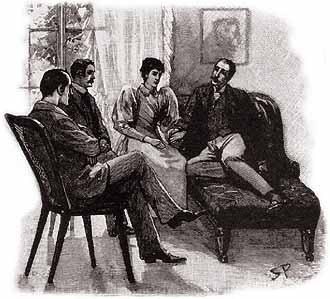
- Holmes, Watson, Annie Harrison and Percy Phelps, 1893 illustration by Sidney Paget in The Strand Magazine
- Country: United Kingdom
- Language: English
- Genre: Detective fiction short stories

Publication
- Published in: Strand Magazine
- Publication date: October and November 1893

Chronology
- Series: The Memoirs of Sherlock Holmes
The Adventure of the Greek Interpreter	The Final Problem

"The Adventure of the Naval Treaty", one of the 56 Sherlock Holmes short stories written by Sir Arthur Conan Doyle, is one of 12 stories in the cycle collected as The Memoirs of Sherlock Holmes. It was first published in The Strand Magazine in the United Kingdom in October and November 1893, and in Harper's Weekly in the United States on 14 and 21 October 1893.

Doyle ranked "The Adventure of the Naval Treaty" 19th in a list of his 19 favourite Sherlock Holmes stories.

== Plot ==
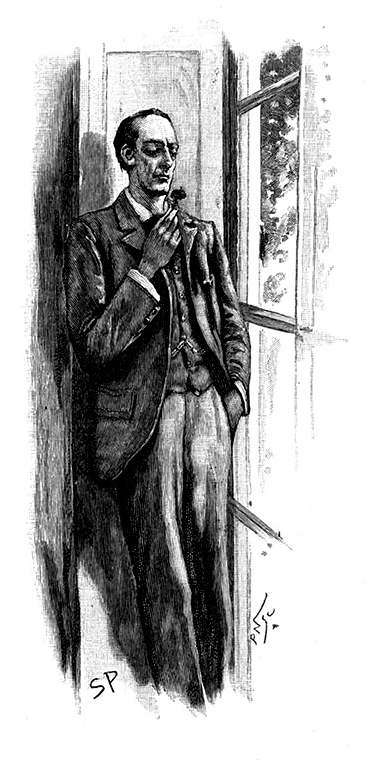
Holmes holding a rose, drawn by Sidney Paget. "Our highest assurance of the goodness of Providence seems to me to rest in the flowers..."

Percy Phelps, a young Foreign Office employee from Woking, sends a letter to Dr. Watson, a former schoolfellow of his. Phelps indicates something has caused him a nine-week attack of brain fever; now that he has recovered, he begs Watson to bring Holmes to his aid. Holmes views the letter, and deduces that it was dictated to, and written by, a woman. He accompanies Watson to Briarbrae, Phelps' house. There, they are greeted by Joseph Harrison, the brother of Phelps' fiancée Annie (the writer of the letter). Joseph shows them in to see Phelps, who is still recovering from his long illness and being nursed by Annie.

Phelps lays the case before Holmes. Two months earlier, his uncle and superior in the Foreign Office, Lord Holdhurst, had ordered him to copy an important naval treaty between England and Italy. The treaty was to be kept secret, for many foreign governments would want to read it. Phelps told no one of this assignment, and waited until the building was empty except for Tangey, the commissionaire, and his wife, who did the charring. Phelps then copied the papers as quickly as he could but it soon became apparent the task would take most of the night.

Phelps rang the bell for some coffee. Mrs. Tangey took the order to her husband; much later, Phelps came downstairs to investigate why he had not received his coffee and found Tangey had fallen asleep. The bell to Phelps' office rang; realizing someone was in the room, Phelps dashed back upstairs and found the naval treaty gone. There were no hiding places, and no one could have passed Phelps on the front stair, so the thief must have come and gone by the back stair. Phelps, a constable, and Inspector Forbes of Scotland Yard frantically searched for the thief without success. Phelps had a nervous breakdown and was escorted back to Briarbrae. As Joseph's bedroom was best suited for a sickroom, Joseph was forced out of it by the doctor. Percy has remained there, nursed by Annie by day and a hired nurse by night.

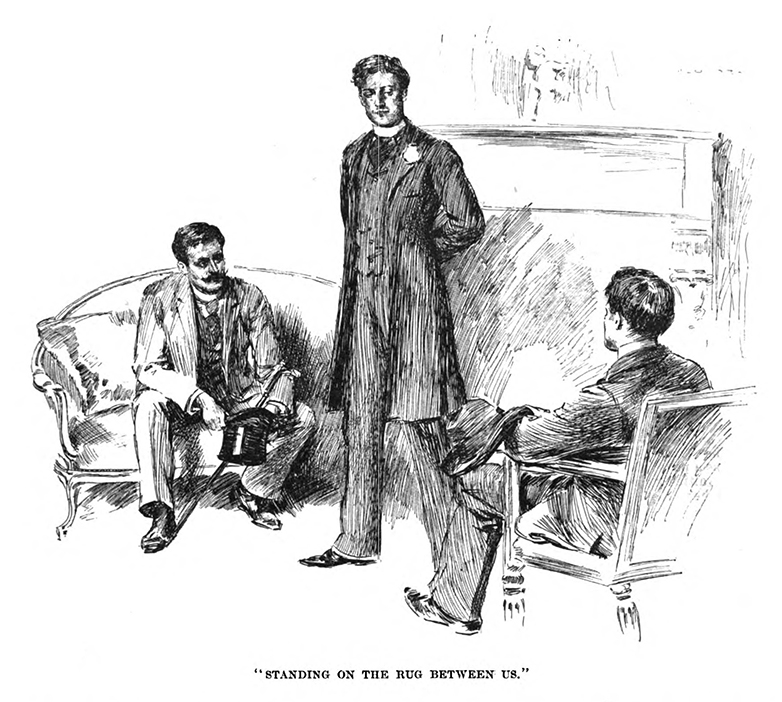
Watson, Lord Holdhurst, and Holmes, 1893 illustration by W. H. Hyde in Harper's Weekly

Holmes starts the investigation at the Foreign Office, interviewing both Lord Holdhurst and Inspector Forbes. He learns that the Tangeys and a clerk named Charles Gorot were suspected and then cleared. Lord Holdhurst informs him that no foreign government has received the treaty yet, which seems odd since nine weeks have passed. Holmes also discovers that Annie and Joseph were never meant to be long-term guests; they had come down for a few days' visit when the tragedy occurred but had stayed so Annie could nurse her fiancée.

Returning to Briarbrae the next day, Holmes learns that Phelps dispensed with the hired nurse the evening before. Later that same evening, someone tried to break into Phelps' sickroom window with a knife. Phelps immediately roused the household, but the burglar got away.

Unbeknownst to Phelps or Joseph, Holmes orders Annie to stay in the sickroom until bedtime and to lock the door behind her when she leaves. He then arranges that Phelps and Watson should go to London. Watson takes Phelps back to 221B Baker Street, but neither can understand Holmes' actions. The next morning, Holmes arrives with disheveled clothes and a bandaged hand. At the breakfast table, he pretends to have found nothing, but then arranges for Mrs. Hudson to serve Phelps the treaty on his breakfast plate. Phelps is overjoyed to have it back, nearly fainting with relief.

Holmes had realized Joseph Harrison was responsible. The sickroom was formerly his bedroom, and only someone in the house could have known when no nurse would be on guard. Joseph had come to Percy's office to ask if Percy was coming home, rung the bell, then found the treaty. As Joseph had some stock exchange debts to pay, he stole the treaty, intending to sell it, and hid it under the floorboards of his bedroom. However, Percy's breakdown and the two nurses on hand in the room had kept Joseph from getting at the treaty for weeks. The first chance he had, Joseph had tried and failed to steal the treaty back. Holmes had kept Annie in the room so Joseph could not get at the treaty during the daytime. After she left, Joseph broke in and retrieved the treaty, but Holmes ambushed him, and boxed him for the papers. Winning the fight, Holmes allowed Joseph to flee, though he wired particulars to Inspector Forbes. Percy wonders if Joseph meant to kill him with the knife; Holmes does not know, but says he would not trust such a selfish man to show mercy.

== Commentary ==
This is the longest of the short stories published in The Strand Magazine before Sherlock Holmes's "death" in "The Final Problem". As such, it was originally published in two parts.

This story contains the first reference to "The Adventure of the Second Stain", which would not be published until around 11 years later, however, Watson's account of the event in The Naval Treaty differs from the actual story.

In 1889, four years before the story was published, Britain enacted its first Official Secrets legislation. This was prompted by the case of Charles Thomas Marvin, a copying clerk at the Foreign Office who had in reality a position very similar to that of Phelps in the story; he was employed to make a copy of a secret treaty with Russia, and promptly disclosed its contents to the press. Marvin was arrested, but was released after it was found that he had committed no offence known to English law; the Official Secrets legislation was aimed at creating such an offence for future cases. The Marvin case got considerable public attention, and Conan Doyle likely knew of it.

== Publication history ==
"The Adventure of the Naval Treaty" was published in the UK in The Strand Magazine in October and November 1893, and in the US in Harper's Weekly (under the title "The Naval Treaty") on 14 and 21 October 1893. It was also published in the US edition of the Strand one month after its UK publication. The story was published with eight illustrations by Sidney Paget in The Strand Magazine in October 1893, and with seven illustrations by Paget in November 1893. In Harper's Weekly, "The Naval Treaty" was published with two illustrations by W. H. Hyde in the first part of the story, and with two other illustrations by Hyde in the second part. It was included in the short story collection The Memoirs of Sherlock Holmes, which was published in December 1893 in the UK and February 1894 in the US.

== Adaptations ==
=== Film and television ===
One of the short films in the Sherlock Holmes Éclair film series (1912) was based on the story. In the short film, titled The Stolen Papers, Georges Tréville played Sherlock Holmes and Mr Moyse played Dr. Watson.

Another short film based on the story was released in 1922 as part of the Sherlock Holmes Stoll film series, with Eille Norwood as Sherlock Holmes and Hubert Willis as Dr. Watson.

The story was adapted for the 1968 BBC series with Peter Cushing. The episode is now lost.

The story was adapted as the 1984 episode "The Naval Treaty" from the first series of the Granada TV series The Adventures of Sherlock Holmes, which stars Jeremy Brett.

"The Great Game" (2010), the third episode of the television series Sherlock, uses "The Adventure of the Naval Treaty" and "The Adventure of the Bruce-Partington Plans" as inspiration, as both deal with the theft of government papers related to the navy.

"Art in the Blood" (2014), the 23rd episode of Elementary, is inspired by the story.

"The Adventure of the One Hundred Tadpoles", a 2015 episode of the NHK puppetry television series Sherlock Holmes, is based on the story. In the episode, Holmes and Watson try to take back a stolen picture which was entered in an art competition. The theme of the competition is tadpoles because "Tadpole" was the nickname of Sir Percy Phelps, founder of Beeton School.

=== Radio and audio dramas ===
"The Naval Treaty" was adapted by Edith Meiser as an episode of the American radio series The Adventures of Sherlock Holmes with Richard Gordon as Sherlock Holmes and Leigh Lovell as Dr. Watson. The episode aired on 19 January 1931. Another episode adapted from the story aired in August 1936 (with Gordon as Holmes and Harry West as Watson).

Meiser also adapted the story as a 1940 episode of the American radio series The New Adventures of Sherlock Holmes with Basil Rathbone as Holmes and Nigel Bruce as Watson. The story was also adapted as an episode titled "The Case of the Stolen Naval Treaty" that aired in 1947 (with John Stanley as Holmes and Alfred Shirley as Watson).

A radio dramatisation of "The Naval Treaty" aired on the BBC Home Service in 1952, as part of the 1952–1969 radio series starring Carleton Hobbs as Holmes and Norman Shelley as Watson. The production was adapted by Felix Felton. Another dramatisation, which was also adapted by Felton and starred Hobbs and Shelley with a different supporting cast, aired in 1957 on the Home Service. A different radio version of "The Naval Treaty" adapted by Michael Hardwick aired on the BBC Light Programme in 1960, with Hobbs and Shelley again playing Holmes and Watson respectively.

An adaptation of the story aired on BBC radio in 1978, starring Barry Foster as Holmes and David Buck as Watson.

The story was adapted as an episode of CBS Radio Mystery Theater titled "The Naval Treaty". The episode, which featured Gordon Gould as Sherlock Holmes and Bernard Grant as Dr. Watson, first aired in April 1982.

"The Naval Treaty" was dramatised for BBC Radio 4 in 1992 by David Ashton as part of the 1989–1998 radio series starring Clive Merrison as Holmes and Michael Williams as Watson. It featured Patrick Malahide as Percy Phelps, Brett Usher as Lord Holdhurst, Norman Jones as Mr Tangey, and Petra Markham as Miss Tangey.

A 2014 episode of The Classic Adventures of Sherlock Holmes, a series on the American radio show Imagination Theatre, was adapted from the story, with John Patrick Lowrie as Holmes and Lawrence Albert as Watson.
