= The Naval Treaty =

- Sherlock Holmes episode
- Episode no.: Series 1 Episode 3
- Directed by: Alan Grint
- Written by: John Hawkesworth
- Based on: "The Adventure of the Naval Treaty" by Arthur Conan Doyle
- Original air date: 8 May 1984
- Running time: 50 minutes

"The Naval Treaty" is the third episode of the series The Adventures of Sherlock Holmes, the first series in the Sherlock Holmes series. The series is based on Sir Arthur Conan Doyle's stories and was produced by the British television company Granada Television between 1984 and 1994 and star Jeremy Brett as the famous detective. "The Naval Treaty" is based on the short story "The Adventure of the Naval Treaty". The episode first aired on 8 May 1984.

== Plot ==
=== Briarbrae House ===
On a rainy night, a frantically crying man (Percy Phelps) is carried into his home by two men while his fiancée (Annie) and her brother (Joseph Harrison) watch over him worriedly. The scene changes to the drawing room at the residence of Sherlock Holmes and Dr. Watson at 221B Baker Street. Watson enters the room with a letter he has received from Phelps, a former school friend. In the letter, Phelps explains that after completing his education he obtained an appointment at the Foreign Office and that a misfortune has occurred which could ruin his career and reputation. He requests that Watson bring Holmes to meet him and offer his assistance in the matter. Holmes deduces that the letter was written by a woman "of an exceptional nature" and agrees to accompany Watson to Phelps’ home, Briarbrae House in Woking. Holmes and Watson meet Joseph Harrison in the garden of Briarbrae House. Inside the house, they are greeted by Phelps himself and Annie in Phelps’ sick room.

=== Theft of the treaty ===
Phelps narrates the incidents of the evening of 23 May, when he was summoned by Lord Holdhurst (the Foreign Minister and his uncle) to his office. Lord Holdhurst entrusted Phelps with the task of creating a copy of a naval treaty signed between England and Italy. He told Phelps that the job must be done very carefully, while making sure that the contents are not leaked, as the Russian and French embassies would pay an immense sum of money for the contents. He suggested Phelps stay to copy the document after everyone has left, stipulating that he must lock both the original and the copy in his desk drawer and hand them over personally the next morning.

In answer to Holmes' question, Phelps tells him that the document defines the position of Great Britain towards the Triple Alliance in the event of the French fleet gaining ascendency over Italy in the Mediterranean. Phelps returned to his office, waited till his colleague Sir Charles Gorot left for the day and then started copying the document page by page. Phelps tells Holmes that he had intended to join Harrison on the 11 o'clock train back to Woking but was not able to because the document was very long.

Feeling tired after working for several hours, Phelps rang for the commissionaire to get him a cup of coffee. The bell was answered by the commissionaire's wife, who said she would request the coffee. When the coffee did not arrive after a while, Phelps left his room, with the original and the half-finished copy on his desk. He found that the commissionaire had dozed off, and while he was apologizing, a bell rang in the commissionaire's room to both their amazement. The bell could only have been rung by someone in the room where Phelps was working. Realizing that the documents are lying unprotected on his desk, Phelps rushed up to his room and found that the documents had disappeared from his desk. Phelps tells Holmes that he did not pass anyone on the stairs while going up. There are two stairs that lead up to Phelps’ office, so the thief must have used the other staircase that opened onto on Charles Street. There is no evidence of anyone leaving the building except the commissionaire's wife.

Holmes leaves the room while Watson administers to Phelps, who is having an attack of breathlessness, and chats with Joseph Harrison. As the eldest son, Harrison is expecting to inherit his father's business but also dabbles in stocks and shares. Harrison tells him that he was not planning to meet Phelps on the evening of the incident and did not know of Phelps' intention to join him on the train back to Woking. Feeling better, Phelps tells Holmes that a search of the commissionaire's home revealed no trace of the document. He has no further recollection of the events since he collapsed and was taken home by a doctor from his neighbourhood who was fortunately traveling back to Woking.

=== Investigations at the Foreign Office ===
Holmes and Watson travel to the Foreign Office, where they meet Inspector Forbes, who tells them they have cleared both the commissionaire and Phelps' colleague Gorot. He has no idea who rang the bell or why. Lord Holdurst tells them that he is certain no one overheard him giving Phelps instructions about the document and no one knew of the task assigned to him. Holmes deduces that the person who took the document came across it unexpectedly and asks whether the feared consequences of the document's leakage have occurred. Lord Holdhurst replies they had not and he would certainly know if any of the foreign embassies were to know about the document. Back at Baker Street, Holmes tells Watson that nothing more can be done that evening unless he gets an answer to his enquiry whether any cab driver dropped anyone at or near the Foreign Office on the evening of the incident.

=== Burglary at Briarbrae House & Holmes' plan ===
At Briarbrae House, Phelps sends the hired nurse away and tells Annie that he will sleep without medication, since Holmes' taking the case has given him new hope. He is awakened later that night to see the silhouette of someone trying to enter through the window. The person flees before Phelps is able to get a look at the face. The next morning, while Watson, Harrison and Phelps are outside discussing the intrusion, Holmes rushes in to ask to Annie to remain in the sick room all day and to lock the room from the outside when she leaves to go to bed. He then invites Phelps to come with him and Watson to London and spend the night there. On the way to Woking station, Holmes suddenly gets out of the carriage, telling Watson to take Phelps to Baker Street and remain there and that he expects to join them by breakfast time the next morning. Holmes spends the day in the countryside, returns to Briarbrae later in the evening and sees Annie reading in Phelps' room.

=== Holmes' nocturnal adventures at Briarbrae House ===
The next morning at Baker Street, Holmes returns with an apparent injury to his left hand. Mrs. Hudson brings in the breakfast on covered dishes. Phelps refuses to eat, but Holmes asks him to help serve breakfast, since his hand is hurt. Phelps lifts the lid off a dish and finds, to his immense surprise and joy, a scroll of paper which turns out to be the stolen treaty.

While eating his breakfast, Holmes tells Phelps and Watson that the previous night he waited outside Phelps' window while Annie locked the door as instructed and went to bed. When a person crept into the room through the window, Holmes followed and discovered that the person was Harrison. He entered the room to retrieve the document, which he had previously hidden in underside of the sofa. After a struggle in which Holmes’ hand was injured by Harrison's knife, Harrison escaped. Watson is surprised Holmes let Harrison get away, but Holmes tells him that he has wired Harrison's details to the police and that it is probably better for Lord Holdhurst and Phelps’ sake that the matter never reach the police court.

Holmes explains that Harrison was under heavy debt due to losing money in the stock market. On the night of the theft, he was free earlier than expected and went to Phelps’ office to join him on the return train. He went in by the Charles Street entrance and seeing no one in Phelps’ room rang the bell. He then saw the treaty on the desk and realised that it was an important state document. So he stole it, went back to Woking and hid it in his room, intending to sell it at a later time. Just as he finished hiding the document, Phelps was brought home.

Harrison had to move out of his room as it became Phelps' sick room, and since there was always someone present in the room, he could not retrieve the document. Holmes reasoned that since the attempt to break in was made on the night that the hired nurse was not present, the person must have known the household well. But since Phelps had slept lightly that night due to not taking his sleeping draught, the attempt failed. Holmes explains that by following Harrison into the room, he allowed Harrison to show him the hiding place preventing the need to rip up the whole room. In reply to Watson's asking why Harrison used the window instead of the door, Holmes says that he did that to make it look like the job of a burglar and if necessary make an escape across the courtyard.

== Cast ==
- Jeremy Brett – Sherlock Holmes
- David Burke – Dr. Watson
- David Gwillim – Percy Phelps
- Gareth Thomas – Joseph Harrison
- Alison Skilbeck – Annie Harrison
- Ronald Russell – Lord Holdhurst
- Nicholas Geake – Charles Gorot
- Pamela Pitchford – Mrs. Tangey
- John Malcolm – Tangey
- David Rodigan – Inspector Forbes
- Eve Matheson – Miss Tangey
- Rosalie Williams – Mrs. Hudson
- John Taylor – Dr. Ferrier

== See also ==
- List of Sherlock Holmes episodes
