= Charles Thomas Marvin =

Picture of Charles Thomas Marvin from his book The Region of the Eternal Fire

Charles Thomas Marvin (1854–1890), was a British author and Foreign Office employee, whose public disclosure of government secrets prompted the creation of the Official Secrets Act.

== Early life and career ==
Marvin was born at Plumstead, Kent, in 1854. In 1868 he was employed in a warehouse in Watling Street, London. At the age of sixteen he went to Russia to join his father, who was assistant-manager of an engineering works on the Neva. He remained in Russia for six years (1870–6) and acquired a good knowledge of the Russian language. For eighteen months he was the correspondent of The Globe and Traveller at Saint Petersburg. Returning to London, on 10 January 1876, after passing the civil service examination, he was appointed as a temporary writer at the Custom House. In May that year he was transferred to the Inland Revenue at Somerset House and then to the Post Office; he later returned to the Custom House.

== Foreign Office career and treaty ==
On 16 July 1877 he entered the Foreign Office as a copying clerk. On 29 May 1878 he was employed to make a copy of a secret treaty with Russia, the "Anglo Russian Convention of 30th May 1878". The same evening he supplied The Globe and Traveller with a summary of the treaty from memory. On 1 June Lord Salisbury, the then Foreign Secretary, faced with the alternative of admitting the secret deal, said in the House of Lords that this summary was "wholly unworthy of their lordships' confidence". On 14 June The Globe printed a complete text of the treaty which Marvin had again provided from memory.

On 26 June Marvin was arrested, but was released on 16 July after it was found that he had committed no offence known to English law. His actions prompted a tightening of internal regulations that eventually led to the enactment in 1889 of Britain's first Official Secrets legislation.

== Post treaty controversy ==
During the Russo-Turkish war in 1878 he contributed to twenty publications.

He died at Grosvenor House, Plumstead Common, Kent, on 4 Dec. 1890 and was buried in Plumstead New Cemetery on 10 December.

== See also ==
- The Adventure of the Naval Treaty

== Works ==
1. Our Public Offices, Embodying an Account of the Disclosure of the Anglo-Russian Agreement, and the Unrevealed Secret Treaty of 31 May 1878, 1878.
2. The Eye-witnesses' Account of the Disastrous Campaign against the Akhal Tekke Turcomans, 1880. Adopted by the Russian government for military libraries and commended by General Mikhail Skobelev.
3. Merv the Queen of the World and the Scourge of the Man-stealing Turcomans. With an Exposition on the Khorassan Question, 1881, in which he predicted that the next Russian advance would be pushed to Panjdeh.
4. The Russian Advance towards India: Conversations with Skobeleff, Ignatieff, and other Russian Generals and Statesmen on the Central Asian Question, 1882
5. The Russians at Merv and Herat, and their Power of Invading India, 1883.
6. The Petroleum of the Future; Baku, the Petrolia of Europe, 1883.
7. Reconnoitering Central Asia, Pioneering Adventures in the Region lying between Russia and India, 1884.
8. The Region of the Eternal Fire: an Account of a Journey to the Petroleum Region of the Caspian. Written in a popularist style, it underwent several reprintings into the early 1890s.
9. The Railway Race to Herat. An Account of the Russian Railway to Herat and India, 1885.
10. Shall Russia have Penjdeh? 1885.
11. The Russians at the Gates of Herat, 1885. The best-known of his works, written and published within a week, which circulated sixty-five thousand copies.
12. Russia's Power of Attacking India, 1886.
13. The Petroleum Question. The Coming Deluge of Russian Petroleum,1886.
14. The Petroleum Question. England as a Petroleum Power, 1887.
15. The Petroleum Question. Our unappreciated Petroleum Empire, 1889.

and translated Colonel Grodekoff's Ride from Samarcand to Herat, 1880.
