= Corps of Commissionaires (United Kingdom) =

Oldest security company

- Country: (United Kingdom)
- Type: Security company
- Colors: Red and White

The Corps of Commissionaires is a British security firm that has regional offices around the UK. It is the oldest security company in the world. Currently trading under the name Corps Security, it is a supplier of specialist security and also owns a monitoring facility in the UK, the Corps Monitoring Centre or CMC.

== History ==
The Corps of Commissionaires was founded in 1859 by Captain Sir Edward Walter KCB (1823-1904). Walter was the first to find an effective remedy to provide jobs for ex-servicemen who were willing and able to work after the Crimean War.

It is the oldest security company in the world. Currently trading as 'Corps Security', the head of the company has always been the British monarch. This tradition began with Queen Victoria and continues through to the present day with King Charles III. In 2009, the Corps celebrated its 150th anniversary with a reception hosted at St James's Palace by the Queen and the Duke of Edinburgh at which 48 commissionaires formed a guard of honour.

== Role ==
Corps Security specialises in providing corporate security and has over 5,000 licensed security staff working in the UK. These staff are managed from 14 regional offices around the UK. Over 40% of the Corps Security staff have spent some or all of their careers in the military, police or fire services.

Corps Security also has regional offices in Papua New Guinea. It also retains strong links with its offshoot, The Canadian Corps of Commissionaires.
