= Edward Walter (British Army officer) =

British soldier

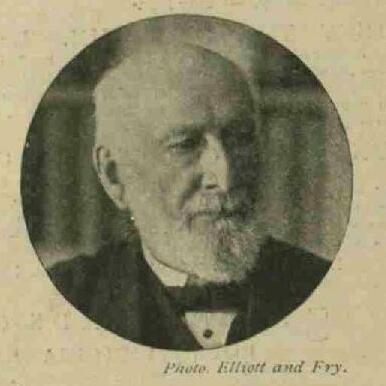
- Born: 9 December 1823
- Died: 26 February 1904
- Spouse: Mary Anne Althorpe
- Father: John Walter
- Relatives: John Walter
- Awards: Knight Commander of the Order of the Bath

Sir Edward Walter KCB (9 December 1823 – 26 February 1904) was the founder and commanding officer of the Corps of Commissionaires.

The son of John Walter, proprietor of The Times, he was educated at Eton College and Exeter College, Oxford. He entered the army in 1843 as an ensign in the 44th Foot, transferring to the 8th Hussars as a captain in 1848. He retired from the army in 1853.

In order to give employment to honourably discharged soldiers, he set up the Corps of Commissionaires in February 1859, becoming its first commanding officer. In response to this work, he was knighted as a Knight Batchelor at Osborne in August 1885 and was admitted to the Civil Division of the Order of the Bath as a Knight Commander in January 1888.

He died on 26 February 1904, and was buried at Wokingham. There is a granite obelisk to Walter in Brookwood Cemetery.

Walter remained the Corps' commanding officer until his death, and was succeeded by his nephew, Major Frederick Edward Walter. Control of the Corps remained with the Walter family until the retirement of Lieutenant-Colonel Reginald Walter in 1975.
