= Phrenitis =

Historical medical diagnosis of brain inflammation

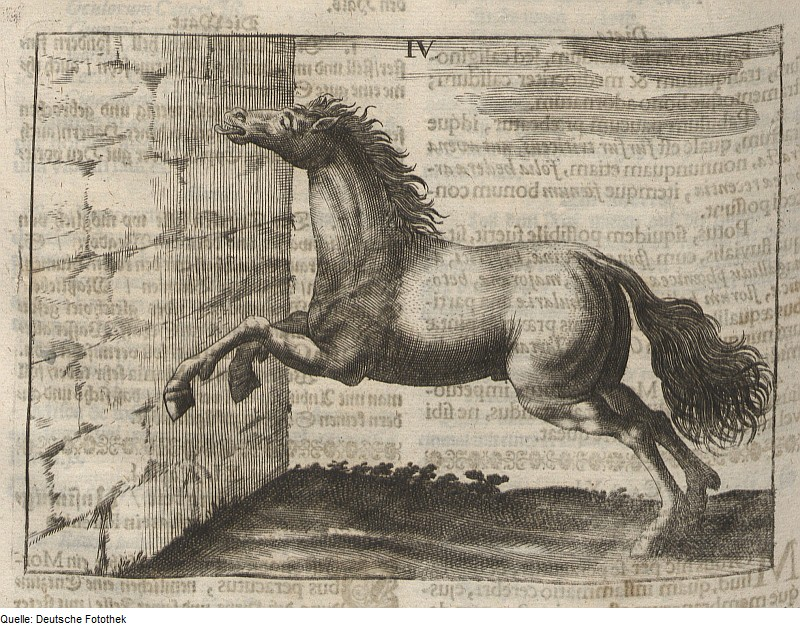
A horse with phrenitis, 1678. Lld manuscript from the Deutsche Fotothek

The term phrenitis was employed in ancient Greece by Hippocrates and his followers. It refers to acute inflammation of mind and body, not in a theoretical but in a descriptive sense. Its presumed seat was never anatomically or conceptually well determined. The diagnosis was used during the Middle Ages: a mental confusion or continuous delirium with fever.

== Definition ==
Phrenitis means an inflammation of the brain, or of the meninges of the brain, attended with acute fever and delirium. Symptoms vary widely in severity, from short-lived, relatively slight effects of headache, drowsiness, and fever to paralysis, coma, and death.

== Phrenitis renamed to delirium ==
The ancient phrenitis concept was used until the 19th century. After that time the concept was replaced by the word delirium. By their epigonic character the detailed descriptions of phrenitis by Gerard van Swieten mark only the end of an uncritical use of the term. The epoch-making work of Morgagni, based on clinical-anatomical observations, provides a definitive insight into the location of the condition and into many pathologic features. Pinel is the last author who mentions phrenitis in a classification of diseases.

== Phrenitis cases diagnosed as meningitis and encephalitis ==
Phrenitis is no longer in scientific use. Nowadays meningitis or encephalitis are diagnosed. Relating to phrenitis: suffering from frenzy; delirious; mad; frantic; frenetic.
