= Freedom of testation =

Freedom to make a last will and testament specifying heirs

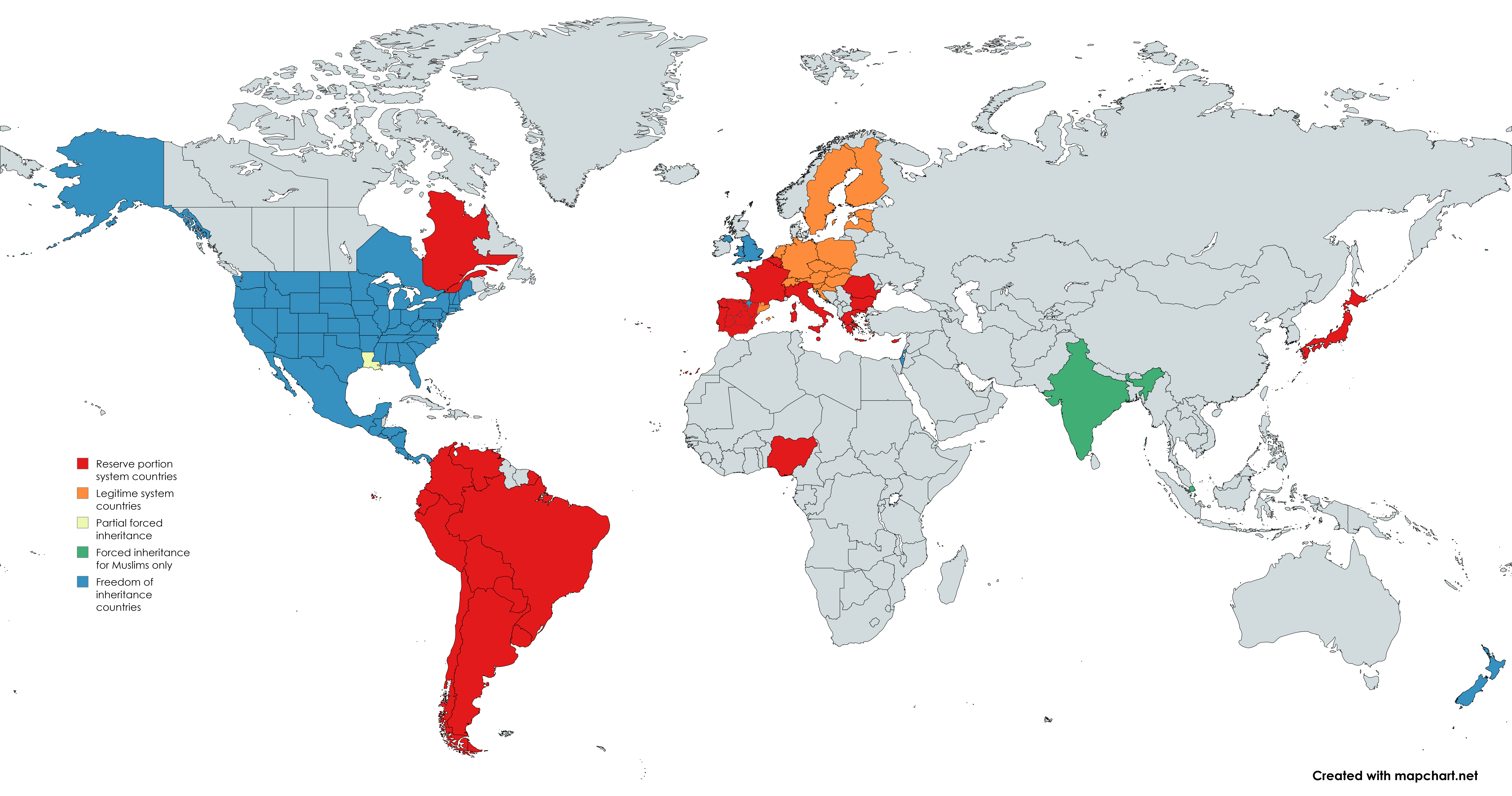
Forced heirship rules by country

Freedom of testation is the power of a person to make a will and testament specifying whatever heirs they please. It is historically associated with English common law, and contrasted with forced heirship, where part or all of the estate is automatically inherited by the next of kin. Opponents of absolute freedom of testation have pointed to the possibility of a widow or orphan being left destitute while property of a spouse or parent is bequeathed to others. Some opponents of inheritance tax have characterized it as an abrogation of freedom of testation.

== History ==
After the Norman conquest of England, the Church succeeded in allowing a person to leave part of his property to the church to fund its activities.

In the law of the Republic of Ireland, the Succession Act 1965 reduces freedom of testation by guaranteeing provision for the spouse and children of the deceased.
