= The Sign of Three =

- Sherlock episode
- Episode no.: Series 3 Episode 2
- Directed by: Colm McCarthy
- Written by: Stephen Thompson; Steven Moffat; Mark Gatiss
- Cinematography by: Steve Lawes
- Editing by: Mark Davis
- Original air date: 5 January 2014
- Running time: 86 minutes

Guest appearances
- Yasmine Akram as Janine; Lara Pulver as Irene Adler; Alistair Petrie as James Sholto; Alfred Enoch as Stephen Bainbridge; Alice Lowe as Tessa; Jalaal Hartley as Mayfly Man/Photographer/Jonathan Small; Oliver Hansley as David; Ed Birch as Tom

Episode chronology
← Previous "The Empty Hearse"	Next → "His Last Vow"

"The Sign of Three" is the second episode of the third series of the BBC television series Sherlock. It was written by Stephen Thompson, Mark Gatiss and Steven Moffat, and stars Benedict Cumberbatch as Sherlock Holmes and Martin Freeman as Dr John Watson. The episode's title is inspired by The Sign of the Four by Sir Arthur Conan Doyle. It is set six months after the series opener "The Empty Hearse" and is primarily centred on the day of Watson's wedding to Mary Morstan. It garnered a viewership of 11.37 million, and received mostly positive reviews.

== Plot ==
DI Lestrade and Sergeant Donovan are on the verge of arresting the criminal Waters family that has evaded the police several times. However, when Lestrade receives a text from Sherlock asking for help, he tells Donovan to make the arrest herself and races to Baker Street, assuming the worst and calling for full backup – only to discover that Sherlock is simply struggling to write a best man speech for John's upcoming wedding to Mary Morstan.

On the morning of the wedding, Mrs. Hudson reminds Sherlock that marriage changes people. Sherlock calls his brother Mycroft, who repeats Mrs. Hudson's suggestion that John and Mary's marriage will change his life.

At the reception, John is delighted to see Major James Sholto, his former Army CO. Sholto (the name is a reference to a character in The Sign of Four) lives in seclusion, having received death threats and media scrutiny after losing a unit of new soldiers in Afghanistan. Sherlock rises to give the best man speech, and begins by reading from the wedding telegrams, after which he expresses his deep love and respect for John and launches into a rambling narrative, describing John's role in an attempted murder case, "the Bloody Guardsman". A Guardsman named Bainbridge had contacted Sherlock, fearing he was being stalked. When Sherlock and Watson arrived at the Guards' quarters, Bainbridge was found seemingly stabbed to death in a locked shower stall with no weapon in the room. John insisted on being allowed to examine Bainbridge's body, discovered he was still breathing, and requested an ambulance. Sherlock says the most remarkable thing about the case was that, while he had focused on trying to solve a murder (he admits that it remains unsolved), John had saved a life.

Sherlock's narrative drifts to the case of "the Mayfly Man". Several days after going to a man's apartment for a romantic dinner, Tessa, who works as a private nurse, found the apartment was vacated and the man had died weeks ago. Sherlock and John, still inebriated from John's stag night, attempt to search the flat for clues but are arrested for their drunken antics. The next morning, an amused Lestrade secures their release. Following up something Tessa said, Sherlock contacts other London women with a similar experience and realizes that all of them have service jobs – such as gardener, cook, or maid. John's knowledge of human nature lets Sherlock conclude that the perpetrator is a man bored with marriage, who adopts the names of recently deceased single men and uses their unoccupied homes to meet women.

While finally beginning his toast to the couple, Sherlock suddenly freezes, recalling that Tessa had known John's middle name (Hamish). Aware that John hates and never uses it, he deduces that Tessa could only have seen it on the wedding invitation. Sherlock concludes that all the women had worked for Sholto in various capacities and were bound by confidentiality agreements. The Mayfly Man had courted them to find and attack Sholto and plans to strike at the wedding. Sherlock slips a note to Sholto, who locks himself in his hotel room and arms himself. Sherlock, John, and Mary race after him but he refuses to open the door until Sherlock finds the solution. He deduces that the Bloody Guardsman case is linked to Sholto's and pinpoints the military uniform both wore as the common link. Sherlock deduces that Bainbridge had been stabbed while on duty, with a stiletto-type blade through his belt, which being worn tightly around the waist, prevented him from feeling his injury and also held the flesh together, so damage did not take effect until he removed it. Upon hearing this explanation, Sholto considers suicide by releasing his belt and bleeding to death. Sherlock persuades him not to, primarily because it would be cruel to do at John's wedding. Sholto then opens the door and requests medical assistance.

Sherlock has Lestrade apprehend the wedding photographer and identifies him as Jonathan Small, the Mayfly Man, deducing he was the only person who could have stabbed Sholto. Small's brother had been one of the men killed under Sholto's command, and he stabbed Bainbridge as practice for this murder. After the arrest the wedding reception resumes, and Sherlock plays the violin for John and Mary's first dance. Afterward he quietly reveals to them that he has observed Mary's "increased appetite, change in taste perception, and sickness in the morning, the signs of three", revealing she is pregnant. Sherlock calms them by explaining that they will make great parents since they've had plenty of practice with him. Despite the happy revelation, the episode ends on a bittersweet note. Sherlock leaves the reception alone upon realizing that his relationship with John will never be the same again.

== Production ==
The episode was directed by Colm McCarthy, who had previously worked with Moffat on the Doctor Who episode, "The Bells of Saint John". The Radio Times reported that McCarthy was recruited "following the departure of director Paul McGuigan, who is credited with having set the distinctive visual template for the programme". According to some sources, such as the Radio Times, "The Sign of Three" was written by Steve Thompson, who had previously authored the Sherlock episodes "The Blind Banker" and "The Reichenbach Fall". However, in a departure from the show's usual style, all three writers received a "written by" credit in this episode's opening titles. Steven Moffat told a BBC Q&A that he wrote a lot of Sherlock's best man speech.

=== Filming ===
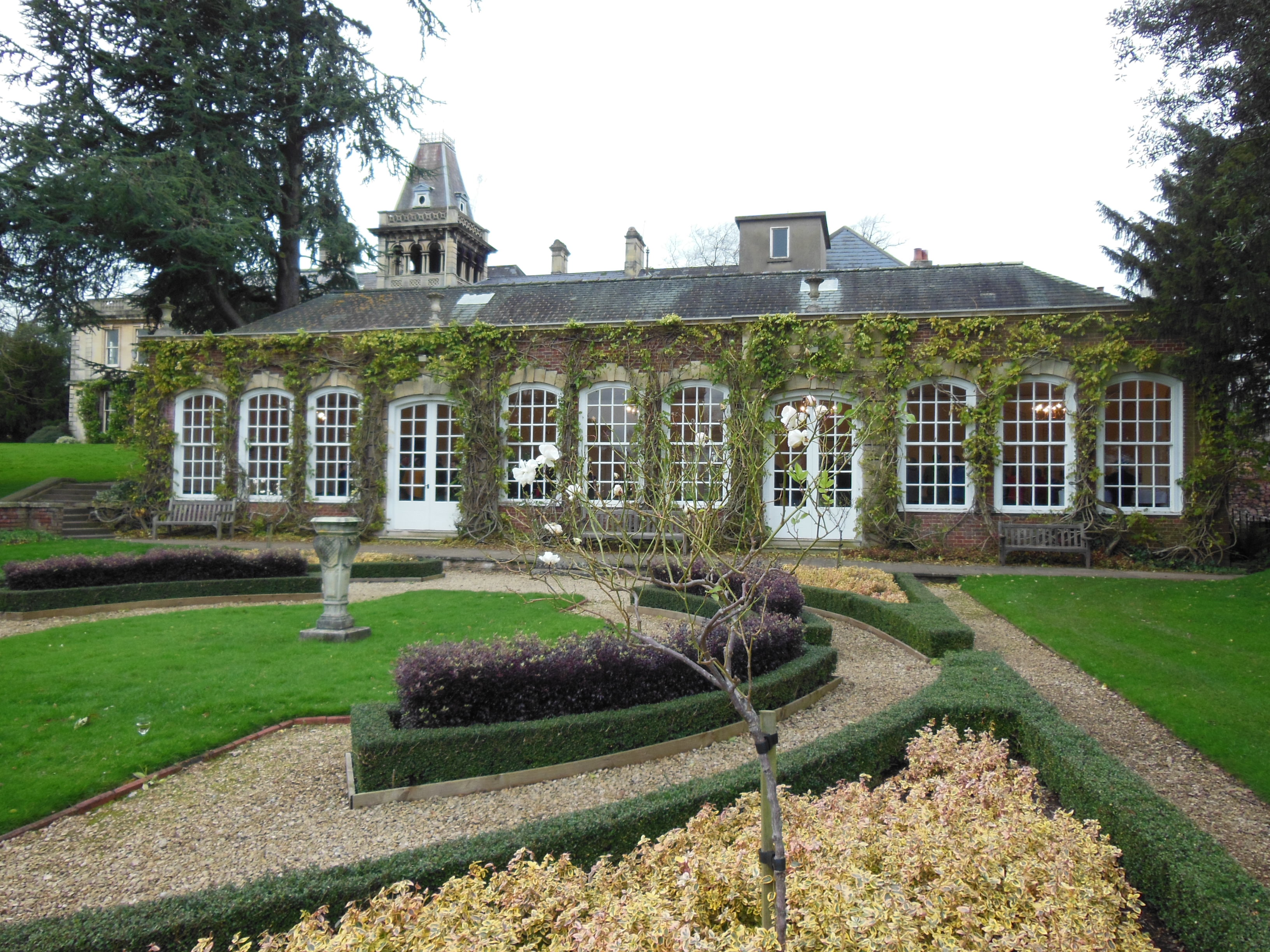
The Orangery at Goldney Hall, scene of Mary and John's wedding reception

The wedding reception scenes were filmed in the orangery at Goldney Hall, Bristol. Other scenes filmed across Bristol include the 'court steps' in the opening scenes are the Victoria Rooms, the bank robbery took place in a former Bank of England building next to Castle Park and John and Mary's wedding scenes were filmed at St Mary's church in Sneyd Park.

== Broadcast and reception ==
The episode was first broadcast on 5 January 2014, on BBC One and BBC One HD at 8:30pm. It attracted 8.8 million viewers, a 31.9% share, which was down from 9.2 million (33.8%) for "The Empty Hearse".

The episode received critical acclaim. The Independent's Neela Debnath commented, "While it is not the strongest story of the Sherlock saga, the writing is just as sharp and fresh, with the mind palace element toned down a few notches. The Sign of Three was packed to the rafters with wit and comedy. There was plenty to leave viewers howling with laughter, mainly thanks to Sherlock's general apathy towards humankind."

Caroline Frost of The Huffington Post commented on the episode's "Conan Doyle-esque recounting of some of their strangest cases", writing, "[t]his combination of montage and memory lane made for an unusual show, somewhere between a Christmas one-off, a Comic Relief-inspired parody and one of these special dream-sequence sitcom episodes." Similarly, Oliver Jia of The Punk Effect stated it as "no doubt the odd duck of the entire Sherlock canon," but proceeded to call the episode "...a clever, hilarious, and moving piece of fine television."

Former Mayor of London and Prime Minister of the United Kingdom Boris Johnson responded to allusions made to him within the fictional newspaper articles about the "Water Gang" which appeared on screen during the episode's opening moments. The lower portion of the front page of a mocked-up newspaper described an unnamed London Mayor as "dithering, incoherent, and self-interested", listing "bizarre" policies including a "recently-mocked concept of putting an airport in the middle of the estuary", which The Telegraph say is "a clear reference to Boris Island." Johnson suggested that the joke, which The Telegraph reported was "visible for just a matter of second[s]", was "perfectly legitimate" as political satire and also could have been directed at the previous mayor. A spokesperson for the BBC said: "Sherlock is a fictional drama series. Both the newspaper and mayor featured in the episode were entirely fictional and were not named or politically affiliated."

IGN's Daniel Krupa had a more negative review, praising Benedict Cumberbatch's acting and some heartfelt, tender moments, but he was critical of the pacing, stating that "the rhythm was just erratic, never allowing you to really ease into the plot", and criticised the further exploration of the character's lives, rather than the adventures.
