= The Six Thatchers =

- Sherlock episode
- Episode no.: Series 4 Episode 1
- Directed by: Rachel Talalay
- Written by: Mark Gatiss
- Based on: "The Adventure of the Six Napoleons" by Arthur Conan Doyle
- Cinematography by: Stuart Biddlecombe
- Editing by: Will Oswald
- Original air date: 1 January 2017
- Running time: 88 minutes

Guest appearances
- Lindsay Duncan as Lady Smallwood; Charles Edwards as David Welsborough; Sian Brooke as Elizabeth; Sacha Dhawan as Ajay; Marcia Warren as Vivian Norbury

Episode chronology
← Previous "The Abominable Bride"	Next → "The Lying Detective"

"The Six Thatchers" is the first episode of the fourth series of the British television programme Sherlock, and the eleventh episode overall. The episode was first broadcast on BBC One, BBC First, PBS and Channel One on 1 January 2017.

== Plot ==
Mycroft presents doctored footage of Charles Augustus Magnussen ("His Last Vow") being shot, so that it will appear to the public as though Magnussen was shot accidentally by a sniper. Sherlock and a committee chaired by Lady Smallwood are attending. Sherlock is freed, and resolves to wait for Moriarty's posthumous revenge.

Mary Watson gives birth to a daughter, who is named Rosamund Mary. John befriends a woman he met on a bus. He starts an intense texting relationship with her but eventually puts a stop to it.

Mycroft and Scotland Yard detectives including Greg Lestrade bring Sherlock various cases, hoping they will reveal Moriarty's scheme. One case involves the son of the Conservative cabinet minister Charlie Welsborough. The son is found dead in a car crash outside their home, despite having been on a gap year in Tibet. Sherlock quickly solves the case, and reveals that the son was hiding in the car, planning to surprise his father, but died from a seizure. A week later, a drunk driver crashed into the car.

Sherlock notes that a bust of Margaret Thatcher at Welsborough's home was missing from its place and finds that it had been stolen and smashed upon the front porch. In the following weeks, five other busts made in the series were also smashed. In one instance, someone was killed. Staking out the location of the last one, Sherlock encounters a culprit. They fight, but the culprit escapes. In the centre of the last bust is a memory stick labelled A.G.R.A., like the one Mary had given to John.

Questioned by Sherlock, Mary relates her past as a freelance agent on a team called 'AGRA'. Each had a memory stick containing their confidential material, lest anyone be betrayed by another. Six years prior, a rescue mission of hostages held at the British embassy in Tbilisi went wrong when the captors were tipped off and killed everyone on the team except Ajay and Mary. Sherlock tries to stop Mary from going after Ajay, but Mary drugs him and escapes.

Mary travels across the world following a random path that "not even Sherlock Holmes could follow." But having planted a tracking device in the memory stick, Sherlock and John intercept her in Morocco. Ajay arrives, having followed Sherlock, and attempts to kill all three. He reveals that, while being tortured and held in Tbilisi, his captors kept taunting him with the word "Ammo" and told him he'd been betrayed by "the English woman", whom he assumed to be Mary. He escaped, having hidden his memory stick in a half-made bust, then sought revenge on Mary, believing that she had betrayed them. The standoff is broken up by local police, who shoot Ajay.

Sherlock deduces that 'Ammo' should be Amo, the Latin word for "I love", which suggests Lady Smallwood, whose code name is Love. Questioned by Mycroft, Smallwood claims to be innocent. Sherlock meets Smallwood's assistant Vivian Norbury in the London Aquarium. Vivian confesses that she tipped the terrorists off in Georgia, using the code "Amo", thus eliminating the hostages and the AGRA team. Her motive was killing the British ambassador, who found that she had sold national secrets. John, Mycroft and the police arrive, and Vivian shoots at Sherlock, but Mary jumps in the way, taking the bullet. Mary professes her love and gratitude to John and Sherlock and dies. John, grief-stricken, blames Sherlock, who had vowed to protect Mary.

In his home, Mycroft finds a sticky note reading "13th" and places a call to "Sherrinford". Sherlock visits John's therapist but is unable to open up to her. Mrs. Hudson gives Sherlock a DVD, which contains a posthumous message from Mary. In the video, Mary asks Sherlock to 'Save John Watson'. Sherlock attempts to visit John, but Molly gives him a note from John and tells him that John would rather have anyone's help but Sherlock's.

== Production ==
=== Locations ===
Series 4 was primarily filmed at Pinewood Studio Wales.

Several location scenes for this episode were filmed in London: scenes involving the bloodhound were filmed at Borough Market and Trinity Church Square in Southwark; Cumberbatch was also filmed on Vauxhall Bridge running towards the SIS Building. Also filming occurred in the Jemaa el-Fnaa square in Marrakesh, Morocco.

== References to Arthur Conan Doyle ==
Joanna Robinson of Vanity Fair, notes that Holmes' request to be reminded of Norbury as an example of his over-confidence is a reference to "The Adventure of the Yellow Face". The other reference to Doyle's "Adventure of The Yellow Face" is when John Watson says to Mary: "I might not be a very good man, but I am better than you give me credit for." This sentence was spoken by Grant Munro to his wife Effie (who, like Mary Watson in "Sherlock", was also hiding a secret) in "The Adventure of The Yellow Face."

"The Six Thatchers" is based loosely on "The Adventure of the Six Napoleons". At one point, Sherlock believes that the suspect is hunting for the black pearl of the Borgias, which he had been asked to look into earlier and dismissed as uninteresting, but it is soon revealed that the suspect is actually hunting for a memory stick containing information about Mary Watson's past. In the original story, the black pearl was the treasure hidden in a bust of Napoleon.

Toby, the dog Sherlock borrows to aid in his search for clues, is referenced in The Sign of the Four, where a trained scent hound helps track Holmes and Watson to a boat landing. The "A.G.R.A" team mentioned in this episode alludes to the Agra Fortress in The Sign of the Four which the character Johnathan Small had to flee during the 1857 rebellion.

== Broadcast and reception ==
The episode premiered in the United Kingdom, the United States, Australia, Latin America, and some parts of Russia simultaneously. In the UK, it was premiered at 8:30 pm GMT on BBC One. In the US, it premiered at 9:00 pm ET/PT on PBS. In Australia, it premiered on subscription streaming service Stan at 10:00 pm AEDT on 2 January. In Latin America, it premiered at 1:00 am GMT on BBC Entertainment. In European part of Russia, it aired on 23:31 MSK ON Channel One Russia, while airing in other parts of Russia and in some CIS states on the same channel on January 3 at 20:55 MSK .

The Six Thatchers received mixed reviews. The Guardian was positive, saying "Cumberbatch channels Bond in the most explosive outing yet". IGN gave a mixed review a 5.5/10 calling it "Mediocre" and "Sherlock returns with a confused and confusing case involving Margaret Thatcher's head." Digital Spy called it "satisfying enough" and saying "'The Six Thatchers' is an engaging outing with one fatal flaw. Everything works... apart from the one thing that really needs to." The Daily Telegraph gave a good review with a rating of 4/5 stars, calling it "a dizzying triumph of complex plotting." After Ralph Jones, in an opinion piece in The Guardian, criticised the episode for making Sherlock into a James Bond-style action hero, Mark Gatiss wrote in personally and responded in the form of verse.
