= List of Sherlock characters =

The following is a list and description of the characters of Sherlock, a British television series that debuted on BBC One in July 2010. The series is a contemporary adaptation of the Sherlock Holmes stories by Sir Arthur Conan Doyle and was created by Steven Moffat and Mark Gatiss.

== Cast table ==
The opening title cards for the show only list Benedict Cumberbatch and Martin Freeman, but other actors have held roles prominent enough to be considered part of the main cast.

| Character | Portrayed by | Series | | | | |
| Character | Portrayed by | Series 1 (2010) | Series 2 (2012) | Series 3 (2014) | Special (2016) | Series 4 (2017) |
Main
| Sherlock Holmes | Benedict Cumberbatch (Note: Louis Oliver and Tom Stoughton portray a young Sherlock Holmes in flashback scenes.) | Main | Main | Main | Main | Main |
| Dr. John Watson | Martin Freeman | Main | Main | Main | Main | Main |
| D.I. Greg Lestrade | Rupert Graves | Main | Main | Main | Main | Main |
| Mrs. Hudson | Una Stubbs | Main | Main | Main | Main | Main |
| Mycroft Holmes | Mark Gatiss (Note: Aaron Richards portrays a young Mycroft Holmes in flashback scenes.) | Recurring | Main | Main | Main | Main |
| Molly Hooper | Louise Brealey | Recurring | Main | Main | Main | Main |
| Jim Moriarty | Andrew Scott | Guest | Main | Recurring | Guest | Guest |
| Mary Morstan Watson | Amanda Abbington | | | Main | Main | Main |
Recurring
| Sgt. Sally Donovan | Vinette Robinson | Recurring | Guest | Guest | | |
| Sarah Sawyer | Zoe Telford | Recurring | | | | |
| Philip Anderson | Jonathan Aris | Guest | Guest | Recurring | Guest | |
| Ella | Tanya Moodie | Guest | Guest | | | Guest |
| Anthea | Lisa McAllister | Guest | | Guest | | |
| Mike Stamford | David Nellist | Guest | | | Guest | |
| D.I. Dimmock | Paul Chequer | Guest | | | | Guest |
| Irene Adler | Lara Pulver | | Guest | Guest | | |
| Janine Hawkins | Yasmine Akram | | | Recurring | Guest | |
| Mrs. Holmes | Wanda Ventham | | | Recurring | | Guest |
| Mr. Holmes | Timothy Carlton | | | Recurring | | Guest |
| Charles Augustus Magnussen | Lars Mikkelsen | | | Recurring | | |
| Tom | Ed Birch | | | Recurring | | |
| Archie | Adam Greaves-Neal | | | Guest | Guest | |
| Lady Smallwood | Lindsay Duncan | | | Guest | | Recurring |
| Sir Edwin | Simon Kunz | | | Guest | | Recurring |
| Bill Wiggins | Tom Brooke | | | Guest | | Guest |
| Eurus Holmes | Siân Brooke (Note: Indica Watson portrays a young Eurus Holmes in flashback scenes.) | | | | | Recurring |

== Main characters ==
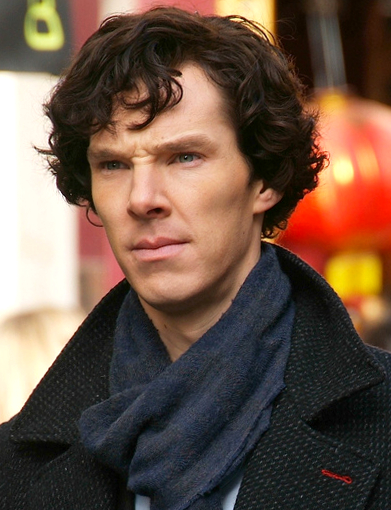
Benedict Cumberbatch as Sherlock Holmes

=== Sherlock Holmes ===
William Sherlock Scott Holmes (Benedict Cumberbatch) describes himself initially as "a consulting detective, the only one in the world", helping out Scotland Yard when they are out of their depth with cases (usually homicides). He appears as a tall, thin man with dark, curly hair. Like the original character, Sherlock is highly intelligent and able to deduce or abduce information from the small details. According to Molly Hooper in the episode The Sign of Three, he is a graduate chemist.

Sherlock has a very unusual personality, and describes himself in the first episode "A Study in Pink", as a "high-functioning sociopath", a term he insists on in subsequent episodes. Others call him a "psychopath", and in "The Hounds of Baskerville" John Watson suggests to Lestrade that he believes Sherlock has Asperger syndrome. This manifests itself in very poor people skills and the extremely rude manners which Sherlock shows toward everyone he deals with. On two occasions in the episode The Hounds of Baskerville, he also appears to suffer from episodes of sensory overload and has minor meltdowns, and fidgeting with his hand after such an episode appears to soothe him. Also a characteristic of autism, Sherlock can be shown to have a very literal understanding of what is said to him – once, when after Sherlock tells John that he wants to go out that evening, John tells him that he can't because he is going on a date, describing it as "two people who like each other [going] out and [having] fun", Sherlock replies that "That's what [he] was suggesting". Nonverbal communication also does not seem to come naturally to him, and he appears sometimes not to understand sarcasm, though he uses it often. During the episode The Six Thatchers, John and Lestrade have a sarcastic conversation during which they compare Sherlock's neediness and selfishness to that of John's infant daughter, and although Sherlock is able to tell that they are making a joke about him, he does not fully comprehend. After asking them if they are making a joke, he admits that he "doesn't get it". He is also disdainful of the "typical" affectionate relationships he sees other people sharing, referring to them as "sentiment ... a chemical defect found on the losing side". He seems to admit that he does not understand sentiment and does not wish to, but he is shown throughout the series to care deeply about his closest friends. Sherlock is, however, skilled at feigning emotion and is shown successfully manipulating strangers – mostly by playing on their weaknesses – into helping him or providing information useful for a case. His brother Mycroft, in the first episode, says Sherlock has the mind of a scholar or philosopher.

Furthermore, Sherlock does not seem to grasp the deep emotional impact his actions have on those who care deeply about him. Though Sherlock's fake suicide at the end of "The Reichenbach Fall" was conducted in order to protect Sherlock's friends, including John (when, two years later, Sherlock is ready to return to London and reunite with John) he seems to have no idea of the pain and grief John has suffered as the result of his "death". When Sherlock reveals himself to John, having disguised himself as a waiter, he is unhappily shocked at Watson's intense emotional reaction and the fact that John does not immediately accept him back into his life. After he and John have become close again, Sherlock is completely shocked when John asks him to be the best man at his and Mary's wedding, and is unable to mentally finish John's statement about wanting to be "with the two people that [he] love[s] and care[s] about most in the world" with his own name. Again, understanding John's words literally, when John first uses the phrase "the best man", Sherlock goes off on a tangent describing the "best man" he ever knew until John pauses him and explains that he is referring to the "best man" for his and Mary's upcoming wedding. During his best man speech later on in the episode, Sherlock moves everyone deeply by telling John that he is sitting "between the woman [he has] made [his] wife and the man [he] has saved; in short, the two people who love (him) most in all this world", and that he was shocked because he "never expected to be anybody's best friend. And certainly not the best friend of the bravest, and kindest and the wisest human being I have ever had the good fortune of knowing".

Sherlock seems to care more about the crimes than about the victims involved. He is rude and appears to be inconsiderate towards others, including John (often leaving him behind and asking him to do menial, domestic tasks such as shopping). As the series goes on, Sherlock is shown to care deeply for John, showing uncharacteristic emotion when his friend's life is in jeopardy or when John comes to his aid. Sherlock states the highest compliment he can give is saying that Mary deserves John as a husband. He considers only four people as his friends: John Watson, Mrs Hudson, Molly Hooper and DI Greg Lestrade, whose first name he never remembers. He also has an extremely complex relationship with his brother Mycroft, his only admitted intellectual superior. Mycroft, from the outset, is shown to care and worry deeply for him whilst at the same time sharing a mix of mutual contempt and respect. Sherlock seems to have grown more fond of his brother as the stories progress, even pleading with Mycroft to attend John and Mary's wedding; though he was also scornful upon hearing his brother admit he'd be saddened by his death.

Sherlock appears largely asexual and describes himself as "married to his work". He is also often interpreted as gay, having said that girlfriends are "not really [his] area". He seems oblivious to the romantic attraction that Molly has toward him in the first two series. After the introduction of Irene Adler, Sherlock seems to feel some interest in her, though her attempts to throw him off by shocking him seem to have no effect on him; and comes to her rescue when she is about to be executed in Karachi. She frequently flirts with and texts Sherlock in "A Scandal in Belgravia", but he seldom responds. When Irene is believed to be dead, Sherlock is visibly affected, with John saying "he's writing sad music; doesn't eat; barely talks" even suggesting he may be "heartbroken". In the following series, Sherlock briefly has a mental image of her in his Mind Palace when thinking of who would know John's middle name, but quickly retorts "Out of my head, I'm busy". In Series 3 he is briefly in a relationship with Janine. This is later revealed to be a ruse to gain information on her boss, and he carefully avoids allowing the relationship to become too intense.

Sherlock has considerable fighting ability, fighting off a man armed with a sword using his bare hands in The Blind Banker. In A Scandal in Belgravia, he disarms and incapacitates a CIA agent on two separate occasions. At the end of series three, seeing no other choice, he shoots and kills Charles Augustus Magnussen, a corrupt and unethical newspaper owner who is threatening to release incriminating material he has on Mary Watson. Instead of going to prison, Sherlock is sent to do dangerous undercover work in Central Europe; this is interrupted by the shocking revelation at the end of Series Three of Moriarty's survival. Sherlock also enjoys dancing; proudly demonstrating a perfect pirouette to Janine in The Sign of Three during the reception of John and Mary's wedding and lamenting the fact that dancing "never really comes up in crime work". In the same episode, shortly after he deduces Mary's pregnancy, Sherlock explains that he is the one who taught John to dance.

He knows the streets and alleys of London extremely well; in A Study in Pink, he quickly figures out what route a cab would take and plans a route to beat it to its destination. In The Empty Hearse, Sherlock works out which paths to take to shave time off the countdown to save John. He has strange connections, including a graffiti artist, as well as the entire network of the homeless (similar to the Baker Street Irregulars' street urchins in the original stories). In solving cases, Sherlock uses a technique known as the Method of Loci, which he calls his "mind palace", which enables him to efficiently store and retrieve information for deductions. Initially the mind palace appears as a series of assorted facts that appear on the screen when a scene is shown from Sherlock's point of view. In series 3, the mind palace became a very elaborate construction where other characters from the series discuss Sherlock's cases with him.

Sherlock has violent mood swings when there are no cases that interest him. He is once seen stretched out on his chair and firing a gun at a smiley face spray-painted on the wall in his flat. He finds smoking impractical in present-day urban London and, therefore, mostly makes do with nicotine patches. He may apply three patches at the same time when it is a "three patch problem", implying the nicotine helps him to think. For the same reason, he plays the violin and even composes music from time to time. Sherlock also has a history of recreational drug use; solving dangerous cases, as he puts it, "as an alternative to getting high". Seen in His Last Vow, Sherlock has a short fuse when high or recovering, shoving Mycroft against the wall of the flat and painfully twisting one arm behind him; John was concerned in this scene that Sherlock would seriously injure his brother.

Despite the challenges Sherlock presents toward potential friends, John is extremely loyal to his flatmate. In series three, after Sherlock returns from his two-year absence, John selects Sherlock to be the best man at his and Mary's wedding. The speech Sherlock gives is somewhat awkward, with his demeanor showing how uncomfortable he is with making a speech in front of strangers, and his apparent lack of understanding when a number of deeply moved guests begin to sniffle and was extremely touched John abruptly hugs him. Although Sherlock is not generally a "hugger", in the episode The Lying Detective, when John, who is still mourning for Mary, begins to cry, Sherlock, without being asked, takes John in his arms and holds him as he cries.

Trying to prevent anyone, specifically the press, from getting a photograph of his face, Sherlock disguises it with a modern cap styled after a classic deerstalker. This becomes his trademark—much to his annoyance as he greatly dislikes the hat, describing it in The Reichenbach Fall as a "death Frisbee" and expressing confusion about the advantage this hat, according to its name, would provide to a person hunting deer. He concludes that as this hat has ear flaps, it is an "ear hat". He seems to have accepted the fact that the hat is now his trademark since he puts one on before greeting the press about his miraculous return in The Empty Hearse. Sherlock is also shown not to enjoy eating; in "The Blind Banker", he explains to Molly Hooper that he doesn't eat while he's working, as digesting slows him down. In the pilot episode of the show, he tells John that he does not eat every day, and later in the episode, John uses the fact that Sherlock has not eaten in several days to convince Lestrade to allow Sherlock to leave the scene of the cabbie Jeff Hope's death – in order to go and eat dinner – instead of staying to share his deductions with the police force.

=== Dr. John Watson ===
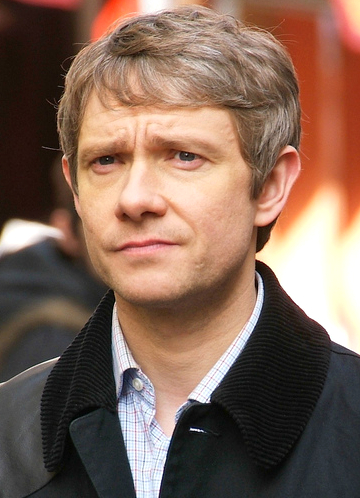
Martin Freeman as John Watson

John Hamish Watson (Martin Freeman) is Sherlock's best friend. He is often a foil to Sherlock in both appearance and personality. Unlike Sherlock, John is short with blond hair. He is friendly, compassionate, and patient, compared to Sherlock's aloof, cold-hearted tendencies. He gets on better with the police and takes care of practical matters at their flat, apparently doing most of the shopping. Sherlock has called him "the wisest, warmest human being [he] knows", and has stated that "the warmth and constancy of [John's] friendship" can redeem even a "rude, ignorant, all-around obnoxious arsehole like [Sherlock]".

John seems to behave as Sherlock's advocate, helping strangers to understand what they should expect from Sherlock as he helps Sherlock to behave in socially acceptable ways. He calmly but sternly corrects Sherlock when he is brash and tries to get him to understand "typical" human emotions, which Sherlock snidely refers to as "sentiment", to him. John is very tolerant and understanding; as Sherlock's flatmate he has to deal with everything from coming home to find Sherlock shooting holes in the wall to opening the refrigerator and discovering a severed human head. He is shown to, in general, be very protective of Sherlock and his quirks; when, at the beginning of "The Hounds of Baskerville", Sherlock is angrily pacing the sitting room of their flat, desperate for a case, John encourages him and tries to help him find something to do, although, after Sherlock's deduction of Mrs. Hudson proves extremely insulting, John tells him off and insists he apologize. One thing John will not do with Sherlock, however, is play the game Cluedo; Sherlock's frustration that the inflexible rules of the game do not allow for scenarios that resemble realistic cases has apparently ruined the game for John. After he becomes engaged to Mary Morstan in Series Three, John develops a code with Mary that they use when one of them realizes that they need to privately discuss an issue Sherlock is having.

At the start of the series, John is recently invalided home from Afghanistan after serving with the Royal Army Medical Corps as part of Britain's role in the 2001–2014 Afghanistan war. He was honourably discharged as a captain. Prior to his military period, John read medicine at King's College London, as seen on his CV. He is in possession of a service pistol, with which he is highly proficient, being described as a "crack shot" by Sherlock. He often uses his former position to help Sherlock and him get into high security places (like in The Hound of Baskerville).

At the beginning of the series, John has several medical issues: a psychosomatic limp in his right leg, a bullet wound in his left shoulder, and an "intermittent tremor" in his left hand. John's therapist notes he has "trust issues" and PTSD, but Sherlock's brother, Mycroft, says that he is far from being "haunted by the war" and that John actually misses the thrill of battle. Following a chase around London with Sherlock, in which he forgets his cane at a restaurant, John's limp disappears, and Mycroft observes that in a stressful situation John has no sign of a hand tremor. When asked by Sherlock, on their first case together, whether he wants to see more horrible deaths, John responds, "Oh God, yes!" In the 3rd series, it is further elaborated that John is subconsciously addicted to danger. Sherlock explains that this is why John chose to put his trust in him, a sociopath who solves dangerous cases as an alternative to getting high, and fell in love with Mary, a former secret agent and assassin.

John is shown to be dependable and brave, with a strong sense of personal integrity. He refuses Mycroft's offer to pay him to spy on Sherlock, despite only having just met Sherlock; however, Series 3 shows John informing Mycroft of anything wrong Sherlock has done, showing he will inform others of Sherlock's actions if they are family. He is willing to use deadly force and shows impressive physical strength; in the episode A Scandal in Belgravia, when a confused Sherlock, who has been rendered ill by Irene Adler's poison, gets out of bed to search for her and falls, John is able to lift him from the floor to return him to bed.

In the first series John gets a locum job at a nearby general practice to supplement his pension. In the second series, John is referred to as Sherlock's P.A. and is not shown working any other job. John writes about Sherlock's cases on his blog, which attracts clients to them. He also gives the cases names he deems appropriate.

Much to John's constant annoyance, he is often mistaken for a gay man because of the time he spends around Sherlock. In the pilot episode, when John first meets Sherlock and begins working with him, many assume they are now a couple. When waiting in a restaurant for the cabbie to arrive, the restaurant owner, Angelo, tells Sherlock that he and "his date" can have anything they want on the menu for free. John insists that he's not Sherlock's date, however Sherlock remains quiet. When John meets Mycroft for the first time, Mycroft asks "Might we expect a happy announcement by the end of the week?" in reference to the fact that John quickly moved in with Sherlock after meeting him. He is indicated to have had a number of short-lived relationships with women – one of whom is shown breaking up with him due to John's commitment to Sherlock, saying angrily "You're a great boyfriend. Sherlock is a very lucky man". In Series 3, when he tells Mrs. Hudson that he is engaged, she asks "So, what's his name?"

The only member of John's family who has been alluded to thus far is his sister, Harriet (aka Harry), with whom he has an estranged relationship due to her being a heavy drinker and the separation of her and her ex-wife, Clara. During their first case together, Sherlock deduces that John had refused to accept help from Harry after being invalided out of the army, even though the fact that she gave John her old phone is an indication that she wants to stay in touch with her brother. John was not too surprised when she didn't show up to his wedding, noting a free bar would have been a bad mix with Harry around. Sherlock also guesses that John's extended family is not very close to him.

John' middle name is revealed to be Hamish, as originally suggested by Dorothy L. Sayers to explain discrepancies in John's name between several of Conan Doyle's stories.

=== D.I. Greg Lestrade ===
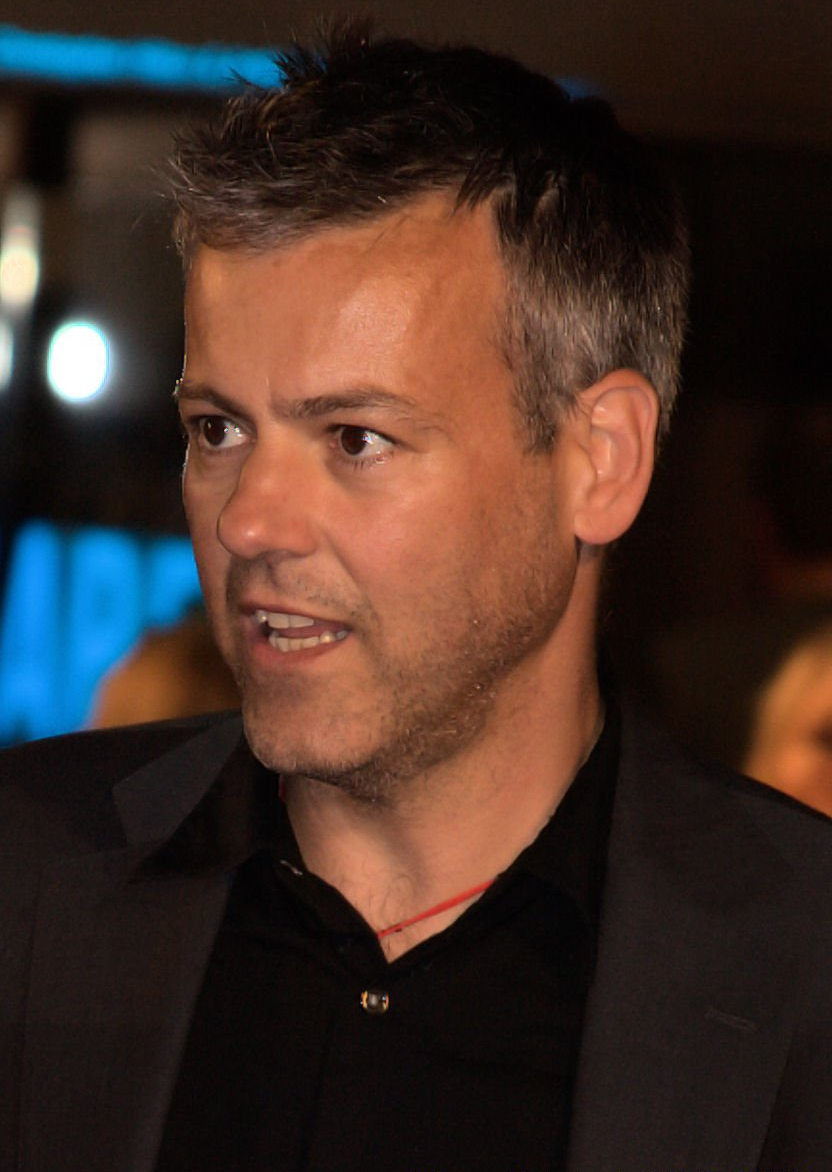
Rupert Graves plays Detective Inspector Greg Lestrade

Detective Inspector Greg Lestrade (Rupert Graves) works for Scotland Yard. He has a reluctant respect for Sherlock and often defends him from the other police officers' animosity. He is often frustrated by Sherlock's cryptic deductions and habit of withholding evidence, but believes that he is a great man (hoping that one day, he can overcome his poorer qualities, and become a "good" man).

In "A Study in Pink", he mentions that he is in an on-again-off-again relationship with his ex-wife. In "A Scandal in Belgravia", Lestrade says he and his wife have settled their problems, but Sherlock flatly informs him that she is (as of Christmas that year) sleeping with a P.E. teacher.

In "The Reichenbach Fall", Lestrade agrees to bring Sherlock in for questioning and it becomes apparent that Lestrade's superiors were not aware of Sherlock's involvement in cases. Unlike Donovan and Anderson, Lestrade had complete faith that Sherlock was innocent of any wrongdoing, proving just how much he trusted him. Later in the same story, Lestrade is one of three people identified by Moriarty as Sherlock's friends (the other two being John and Mrs Hudson). While the two had a strained relationship in the past, Lestrade overwhelmingly embraces Sherlock in "The Empty Hearse" when the latter reveals himself to be alive (even though Sherlock wrongly addresses Lestrade as Graham). In "The Sign of Three", Lestrade's faith in Sherlock is shown when he drops a pressing matter to comply with his requests (which proves to be embarrassing when Sherlock's request for help was revealed to be motivated by nothing more than a desire for assistance in writing his best man speech for John's wedding).

After a traumatic case involving the Holmes' psychotic sister, Eurus, which was ended when Sherlock made a genuinely emotional plea to her as he acknowledged her condition, Lestrade noted at the case's conclusion that Sherlock was "a good man", able to recognize the human element that he had once lacked.

Although Lestrade is ranked as 'DI,' i.e. 'Detective Inspector', the Lestrade in the original novels was ranked as Inspector (the rank of 'DI' not having been created at that time.) A running joke in the series is that Sherlock consistently fails to remember Lestrade's first name, with Lestrade noting that Sherlock remembering his name properly is a sign of his social improvement.

=== Mrs. Hudson ===
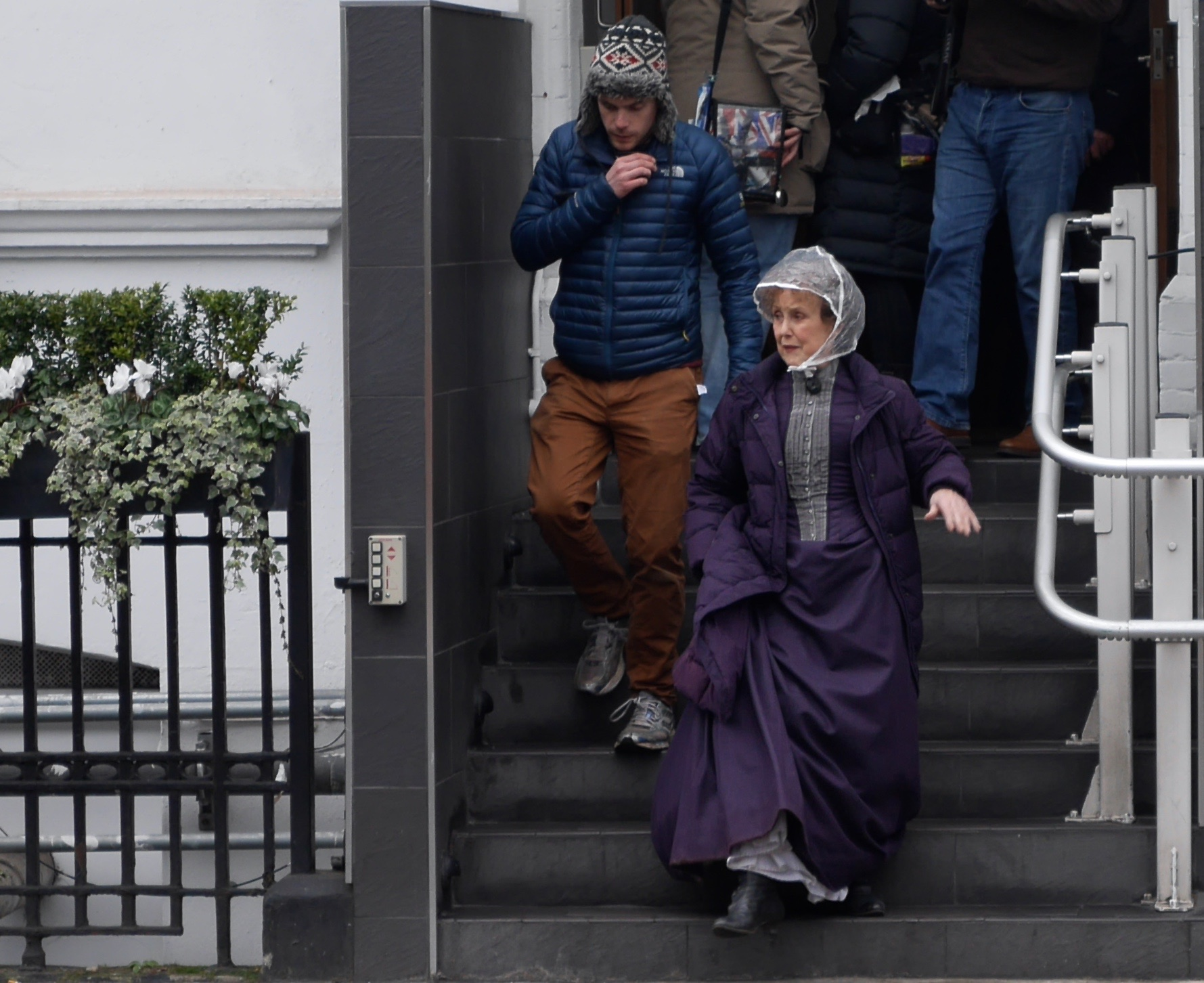
Una Stubbs as Mrs. Hudson while filming for Sherlock.

Martha Louise Hudson, née Sissons (Una Stubbs) is the landlady of 221B Baker Street. Sherlock won his way into her good graces after ensuring her husband, who ran a drug cartel, was executed for a double murder in Florida.

Although she repeatedly insists that she is not their housekeeper, Mrs. Hudson fusses over Sherlock as if she were, and he takes it for granted that she will provide dinner for him. She is often horrified to see Sherlock keep human body parts in his kitchen appliances (refrigerator, microwave) for experimentation. In "A Study in Pink", upon first meeting John, Mrs. Hudson thought he was Sherlock's romantic partner, and throughout the show, she is seen to still believe that they are a gay couple, despite John's repeated protests that he is not gay and that he and Sherlock are not a couple. Despite his impatience at her concern for him, Sherlock has shown to have a great deal of affection for Mrs. Hudson; for example while he often tells her to shut up when he considers her input an annoyance, he is quick to reprimand his brother Mycroft for attempting to do the same. In "A Scandal in Belgravia", Sherlock pushes a CIA agent out of a second-story window multiple times to punish him for torturing Mrs. Hudson; later in the same episode when John suggests Mrs. Hudson leave Baker Street for her own safety, Sherlock appears appalled at the notion and informs John 'England would fall' should such a thing happen.

It is revealed in His Last Vow (along with her full name) that she is a "semi-reformed alcoholic", a former "exotic dancer", and that her weakness is marijuana. Sherlock later makes a jab at her past, when explaining the secrets held by the people John knew.

In the hallucinations of "The Abominable Bride", Mrs. Hudson is shown upset that she has no speaking role in Watson's stories and Sherlock suggests he "give her some lines" as she "is perfectly capable of starving us".

In "The Lying Detective", Mrs. Hudson is shown to own a very fast sports car – although she is a somewhat reckless driver – defending her possession of it by noting that she is the widow of a drug dealer who owns property in central London. Later in the episode, when Mycroft has agents turning over the flat to explain Sherlock's recent actions and finds a DVD the recently deceased Mary Watson recorded for Sherlock, Mrs. Hudson orders all the agents to leave her and John alone to watch the recording unless they wish to prove that they "have no human decency", subsequently ordering Mycroft "Get out of my house, you reptile!" when he remains in the room regardless. When a bomb is 'delivered' to Baker Street via drone, putting Sherlock, John, and Mycroft in a position where they will have three seconds to flee out of the room before the bomb explodes, Sherlock uses his knowledge of Mrs. Hudson's routine to calculate when would be the safest time to leave the room so that she will be unharmed by the blast, as she was initially hoovering directly beneath them.

=== Mycroft Holmes ===
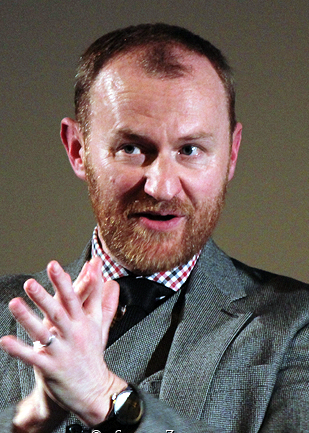
Mark Gatiss plays Mycroft Holmes

Mycroft Holmes (played by the show's executive producer, co-creator, and writer Mark Gatiss) is first introduced when he abducts John and offers to pay him to spy on Sherlock. He is Sherlock's older brother and engages in sibling rivalry with Sherlock. Mycroft is frequently mocked by Sherlock for "putting on weight". He occupies a "minor position in the British government"; however, as with many Holmes-based works, it is heavily hinted that he has a much bigger role than he claims – on one occasion, Sherlock sarcastically remarks that Mycroft is the British government "when he's not too busy being the British Secret Services, or the CIA on a freelance basis". He is driven around in a private car with his personal assistant who goes by the name of "Anthea".

Just as in the Doyle books, Mycroft is even more skilled at deduction, correcting Sherlock on occasion and often beating him in deduction exercises, as well as lacking enthusiasm for "legwork". His intellect is borderline superhuman, allowing him to learn Serbian in a couple of hours (with Sherlock even noting that he once was capable of learning languages much faster). As such, even Sherlock admits that Mycroft is smarter than he is; in reference to their childhood, Mycroft thought Sherlock was "an idiot", only changing his mind when they compared themselves with other children. While Mycroft's social skills are far superior to Sherlock's, it is at times hinted that his private life is rather lonely as well as nobody can keep up with his intellect. Mycroft declines his invitation to the Watsons' wedding, aware how his behaviour would rather drag the ceremony. He is further quite unaware that Lady Smallwood appears to be flirting with him.

Despite not paying John like he originally suggested, Mycroft is kept informed of anything his brother does that may be illegal, as seen in "His Last Vow", where John informs him Sherlock had seemingly relapsed back into his old drug habits. Though concerned, Mycroft jokes it would be safer for Sherlock to cross-dress like their uncle.

Mycroft knows his brother well, saying Sherlock considers himself a dragon-slayer; the villains Sherlock catches are the equivalent of dragons. In Mycroft's opinion, Sherlock has "the mind of philosopher or scientist, yet he elects to be a detective". However, he considers this an improvement, since as a child, Sherlock initially wanted to be a pirate. Charles Augustus Magnussen in His Last Vow reveals Mycroft to be in the Secret Intelligence Service and, effectively, the most important person in the UK.

The brothers have been seen challenging each other's wits throughout the series, and enjoy playing Operation as though it were a chess game. Cigarette addiction is something Mycroft shares with Sherlock; Sherlock remarks that Mycroft can only handle low tar cigarettes and thus "smokes like a beginner". Sherlock also declares to John that Mycroft has OCD, albeit in the same moment that Sherlock reveals a touch of his own OCD.

In "The Abominable Bride", in Sherlock's Mind Palace, Mycroft is shown to be morbidly obese and engaging in a bet with Sherlock as to how long he has before dying. (Recurring series 1. Main series 2–)

=== Molly Hooper ===
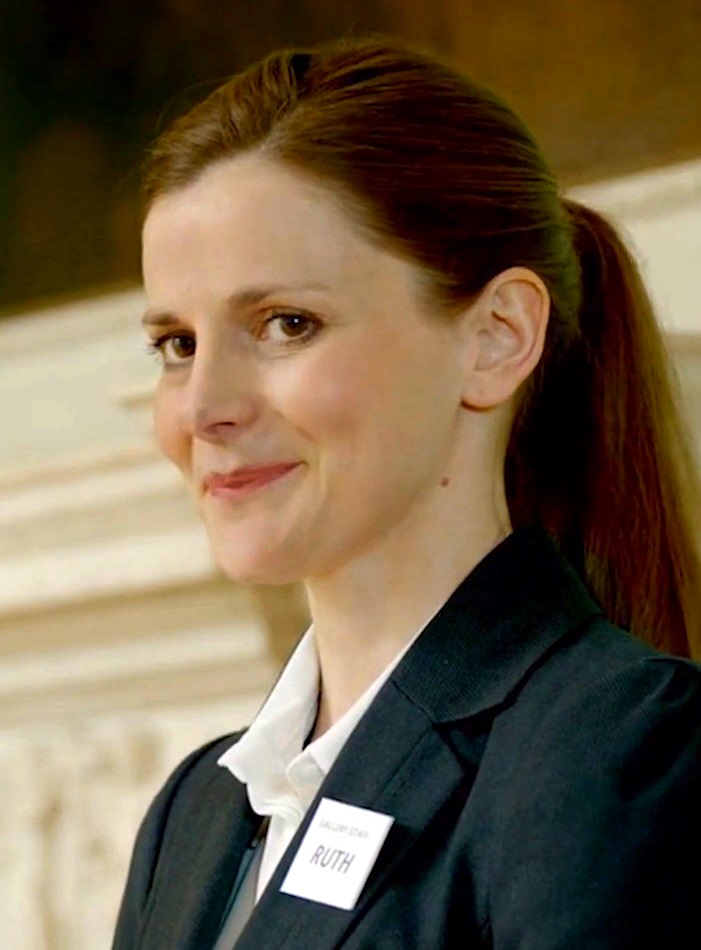
Louise Brealey plays Molly Hooper

Molly Hooper (Louise Brealey) is a 31-year-old specialist registrar working in the morgue at St Bartholomew's Hospital with an apparent crush on Sherlock. Due to her work position and crush on him, Sherlock frequently exploits her to let him examine or perform experiments on victims' bodies, such as in Sherlock's first scene in "A Study in Pink", beating them with a riding crop in order to study postmortem bruising. In "The Great Game", she was in a relationship with an IT employee named Jim, later revealed to be Moriarty, who was using her to see Sherlock up close.

Sherlock only finds out how deeply infatuated she is with him during "A Scandal in Belgravia", when he acidly deduces that the Christmas present at the top of her bag is better wrapped than the others, and must be for someone she loves, and then discovers it is for him; she received a very uncharacteristic kiss on the cheek and apology for this. In "The Reichenbach Fall", Sherlock turns to her to help him fake his death. At one point, Molly points out how sad Sherlock looks when he thinks John cannot see him. He states that she can see him to which she replies that she does not count. Sherlock later tells her that she does count, that she has always counted and that he has always trusted her. When she asks what he needs, he replies with "you".

In "The Empty Hearse", while John is recovering from the hurt and shock of discovering Sherlock is still alive, she accompanies Holmes on some casework. It is revealed that she was a confidante and a key element when Sherlock faked his death. Sherlock also tells her that Moriarty made a mistake in believing that she did not matter to him, when he, in fact, admits to her that she was "the one person who mattered the most". During the first two episodes of the third series, she is engaged to Tom (Ed Birch) who looks and dresses quite a bit like Sherlock. In "The Sign of Three", Molly stabs Tom with a plastic fork when he interrupts Sherlock. By "His Last Vow", the engagement has been broken off—Sherlock observes she is not wearing her engagement ring. During her engagement to Tom, when Molly mentions the intimacy she and Tom are sharing, Sherlock appears confused.

In "The Abominable Bride", Molly appears disguised as a man (also named "Hooper") who runs the morgue, and is extremely irritable towards Sherlock; John sees through her disguise, identifying her as a woman trying to get ahead in a "male world"; he remarks that the perception of such things is something that Sherlock is unusually bad at.

In "The Six Thatchers", John and Mary ask Molly (along with Mrs. Hudson and a reluctant Sherlock) to be a godparent for their daughter Rosie. During the episode, Molly babysits Rosie on several occasions as John and Mary assist Sherlock. When Mary is killed, Molly stays with John to look after the baby and informs Sherlock that John wants nothing to do with him.

In "The Final Problem", Sherlock's deranged sister threatens to detonate a bomb in Molly's flat unless he can phone her and get her to say the words 'I love you' without revealing that she is in danger. Sherlock is forced to say "I love you" to Molly. He says it twice in desperation, and afterwards, Molly finally says it too. After this scene, Sherlock proceeds to break the coffin that was supposed to be hers in a very agitated state, thus showing how much he cares for his friend. In an interview, Steven Moffat said that "In the end of that scene, she's a bit wounded by it all", but also that "Molly was fine". Molly was originally intended to be a one-off character to introduce Sherlock, but Brealey impressed Moffat and Gatiss and they "couldn't resist bringing her back". She transitions from a recurring character in Series 1 to a main character from Series 2 onward.

=== Mary (Morstan) Watson ===
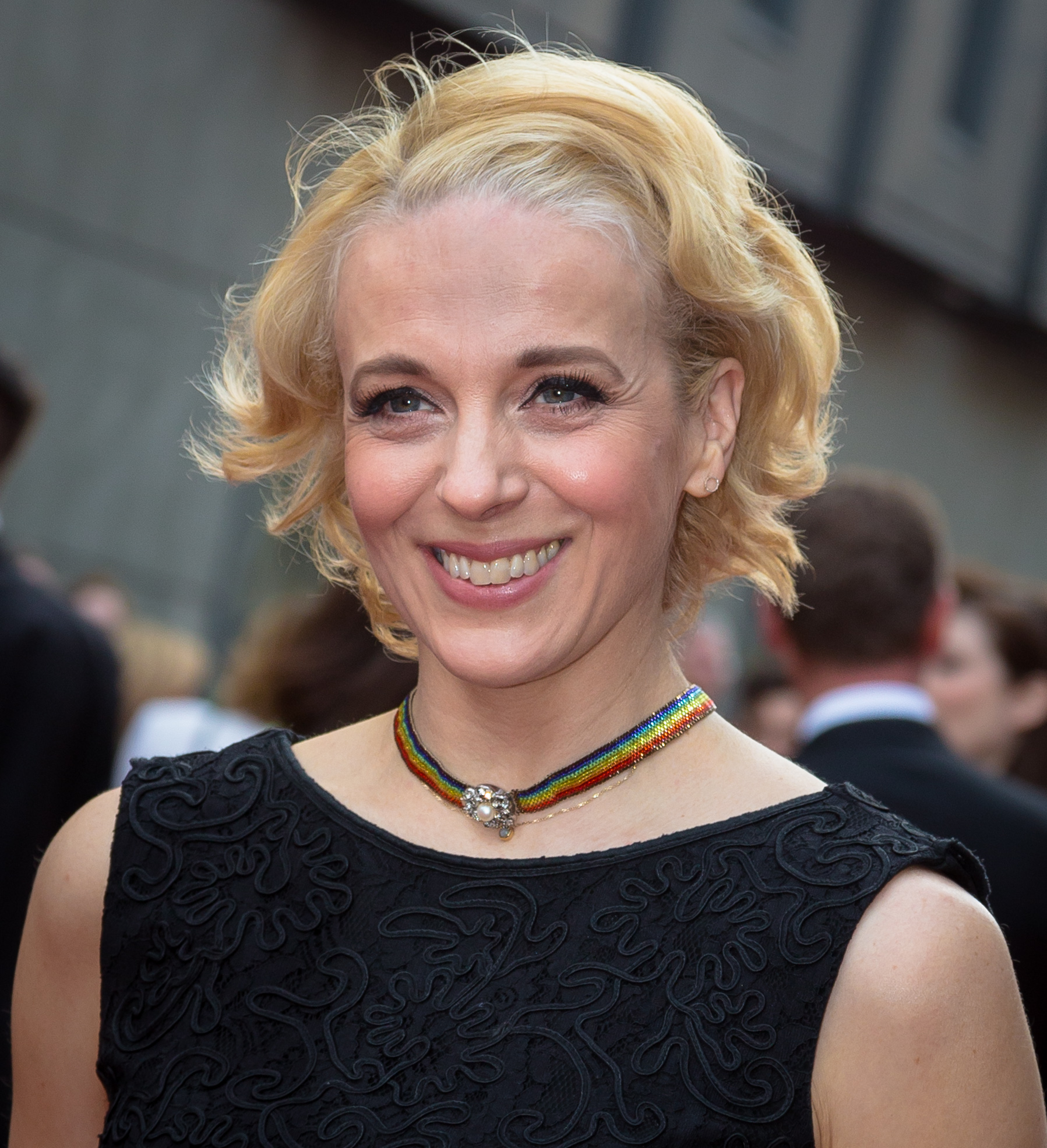
Amanda Abbington plays Mary Morstan

Mary Morstan (Amanda Abbington) is a former assassin and a part-time nurse in John's practice whom he met following the apparent death of Sherlock. She surprises Sherlock with her knowledge and insight into his character. She marries Watson, with Sherlock as best man.

In "The Empty Hearse", Mary is upset with Sherlock when they meet, since John had been through a great deal of emotional pain; however, she quickly warmed to him, and saw that Sherlock had great challenges when it came to understanding human emotions. Knowing the great friendship John shared with Sherlock, Mary then made it her job to try to get John to forgive Sherlock.

In "The Sign of Three", it is revealed that Mary is an orphan. She had another boyfriend prior to John, but is now good friends with him (from her perspective); unknown to Mary, her ex retained an unhealthy attraction to her, forcing Sherlock to intimidate him before the wedding by describing himself as "a high-functioning sociopath... with your number". She seems to know how to get what she wants from both John and Sherlock. She understands both of them very well and respects their close, brotherly friendship; during "The Sign of Three" as the three of them sit in the flat at Baker Street planning the wedding, she realizes how much Sherlock, who is averse to change, needs to know that John still cares deeply about him and will always be his friend, and how much John also needs to connect with him, and insists that the two of them go out on a case. During this scene, Mary sees that Sherlock is afraid, as evidenced by the large number of Sydney Opera House-shaped origami serviettes he is seen to have created out of nervous energy while John and Mary had had their private conversation. She is also very patient during Sherlock's long-winded and embarrassing best man speech at the reception of her and John's wedding, appearing to be quite amused by Sherlock's rambling, awkward, but ultimately very touching soliloquy. During the show, Mary is shown to have an unusually excellent memory and the ability to understand a skip code; clues which help Sherlock realize that all is not as it seems with Mrs. Watson. It is later revealed in "His Last Vow" that Mary is in fact a former intelligence agent, who went freelance and eventually on the run, and might not be English. An upset John even commented she should have married Sherlock since they're so alike. She stole her identity from a dead child five years before marrying John, seemingly deliberately choosing one named Mary as she "always liked" her middle name. Despite all the lies she told him, she genuinely loves John and says she only sought to escape her previous life; she was prepared to shoot both Sherlock and Charles Magnussen to ensure John never learnt the truth; though, as a world-class sharpshooter, she was able to shoot Sherlock in such a way that he would be hospitalized but would not die. At the end of the third series, Mary is pregnant with a daughter.

In "The Six Thatchers", Mary gives birth to her and John's daughter, whom they name Rosamund (which is revealed to be her real first name). More information about her past is revealed, when a former member of A.G.R.A. (a freelance special forces unit) attempts to track her down, blaming her for betraying their squad during a failed mission in Tbilisi, Georgia which resulted in his capture and torture. Sherlock works out the traitor was government official Vivian Norbury, whom he and Mary confront in the London Aquarium. As Mycroft and the police arrive, Norbury produces a gun and shoots at Sherlock, but Mary takes the bullet and dies in John's arms. Sherlock receives a posthumous DVD message from Mary, assigning him his "most difficult case"—to "save John Watson". Although Holmes follows Mary's 'advice' by putting himself in a dangerous situation that John will have to rescue him from, John only moves to save Sherlock when he finds the DVD himself and realizes what his friend is doing, musing in the aftermath that he is not the man Mary believed he was even if he wants to be. At the conclusion of the third episode "The Final Problem", John receives another posthumous DVD from Mary, in which she notes that the two of them are, effectively, junkies: one who solves crime to get high and the other a doctor who never came back from the war, but that what truly matters is that the two of them maintain the "last refuge for the desperate" at 221B Baker Street. Mary smiles as she reflects that they will always be her "Baker Street Boys", answering the strange cases that nobody else can solve when people truly need help. She also claims that "who you really are, it doesn't matter". (Main series 3–4)

== Metropolitan Police personnel ==
=== Sgt. Sally Donovan ===
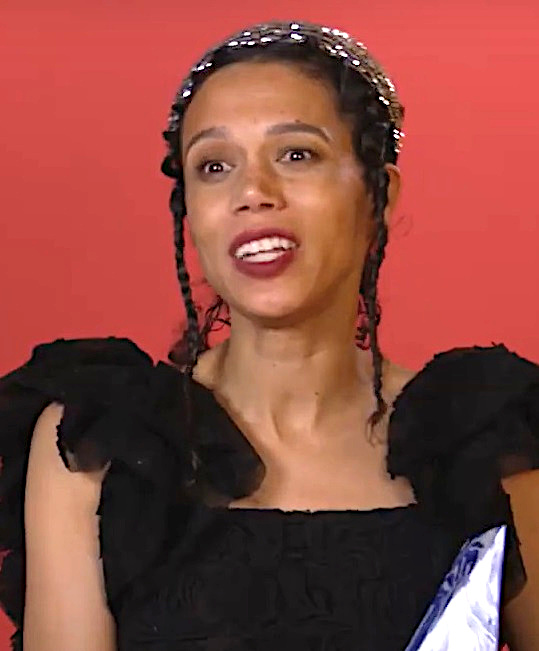
Vinette Robinson plays Sally Donovan

Sergeant Sally Donovan (Vinette Robinson) is often seen working with DI Lestrade on cases. Donovan resents Sherlock's presence at crime scenes and treats him with extreme disrespect and rudeness, cruelly calling him a "freak" to his face, and warns Watson that Sherlock is a psychopath who will one day get bored of catching killers and become one himself.

In "A Study in Pink", she is having an affair with Anderson, which Sherlock reveals, severely embarrassing the pair, and in The Reichenbach Fall she is the first police officer to fall for Moriarty's deception and believe that Sherlock may be behind the recent theft and kidnapping. Her image and Anderson's appeared in a montage during The Empty Hearse, when a news reporter asked why the police let the accusations against Sherlock go so far. In "The Sign of Three", she's shown to be very supportive of Lestrade when it comes to difficult cases Sherlock isn't involved in.

In the pilot episode she was played by Zawe Ashton and portrayed as a uniformed officer, rather than a detective.

=== Philip Anderson ===
Philip Anderson (Jonathan Aris) is originally a member of the Metropolitan Police's Forensic Services. From the series opening, it is clear that Anderson and Sherlock have history of mutual dislike with Sherlock repeatedly humiliating Anderson and Anderson refusing to assist him at crime scenes.

In "A Study in Pink", Sherlock reveals, to both their embarrassment, Anderson and Sgt. Donovan's affair. He later deduces Anderson's wife has left him. Also in that episode, Anderson, who has at least some familiarity with German, concludes that the letters that the dying Jennifer Wilson, poisoned by the cabbie Jeff Hope, carved into the floor with her fingernail, "Rache", spell the German word for "revenge". In "The Reichenbach Fall", Anderson is the second person at The Yard to be deceived by Moriarty into thinking Sherlock may be involved in the recent theft and kidnapping.

He appears in the mini-episode "Many Happy Returns" where it is revealed that he has lost his job with the police and is trying to convince Lestrade that Sherlock is not only alive but also is still solving mysteries across the globe.

His first name is not mentioned until the opening episode of series 3, "The Empty Hearse". In the third series, he has become one of Sherlock's most avid fans, the founder of "The Empty Hearse", a club which believes Sherlock to have faked his death during the events of "The Reichenbach Fall", and a rather avid conspiracy theorist regarding his fall. Sherlock deduces that this is due to his guilt at having been eager to believe Moriarty's manipulations and having been a prime instrument in Sherlock's "death". By the end of "The Empty Hearse", Sherlock tells Anderson a possible explanation of how he escaped death (it is never revealed if it was false or not, though some aspects of this particular explanation are later proven to be the truth). Anderson is initially disappointed with the explanation, and as Sherlock leaves, he tries to prove that it is fake, before having the revelation that he is the last person Sherlock would come to, to reveal the truth about his death. He is left collapsing into hysterical laughter, ripping all his evidence from his walls.

In "His Last Vow", Anderson is called upon by Mycroft and John to inspect Sherlock's flat for drugs. After Sherlock reveals that he's going against Magnussen, Anderson is threatened by Mycroft into never speaking of what he heard. Mary later questions him along with others that know Sherlock to find all of the places where he might be, with Anderson having supposedly followed (or rather stalking) Sherlock to a safe house in Leinster Gardens, which Mary accurately deduces is the location to find Sherlock.

== Villains ==
=== Jim Moriarty ===
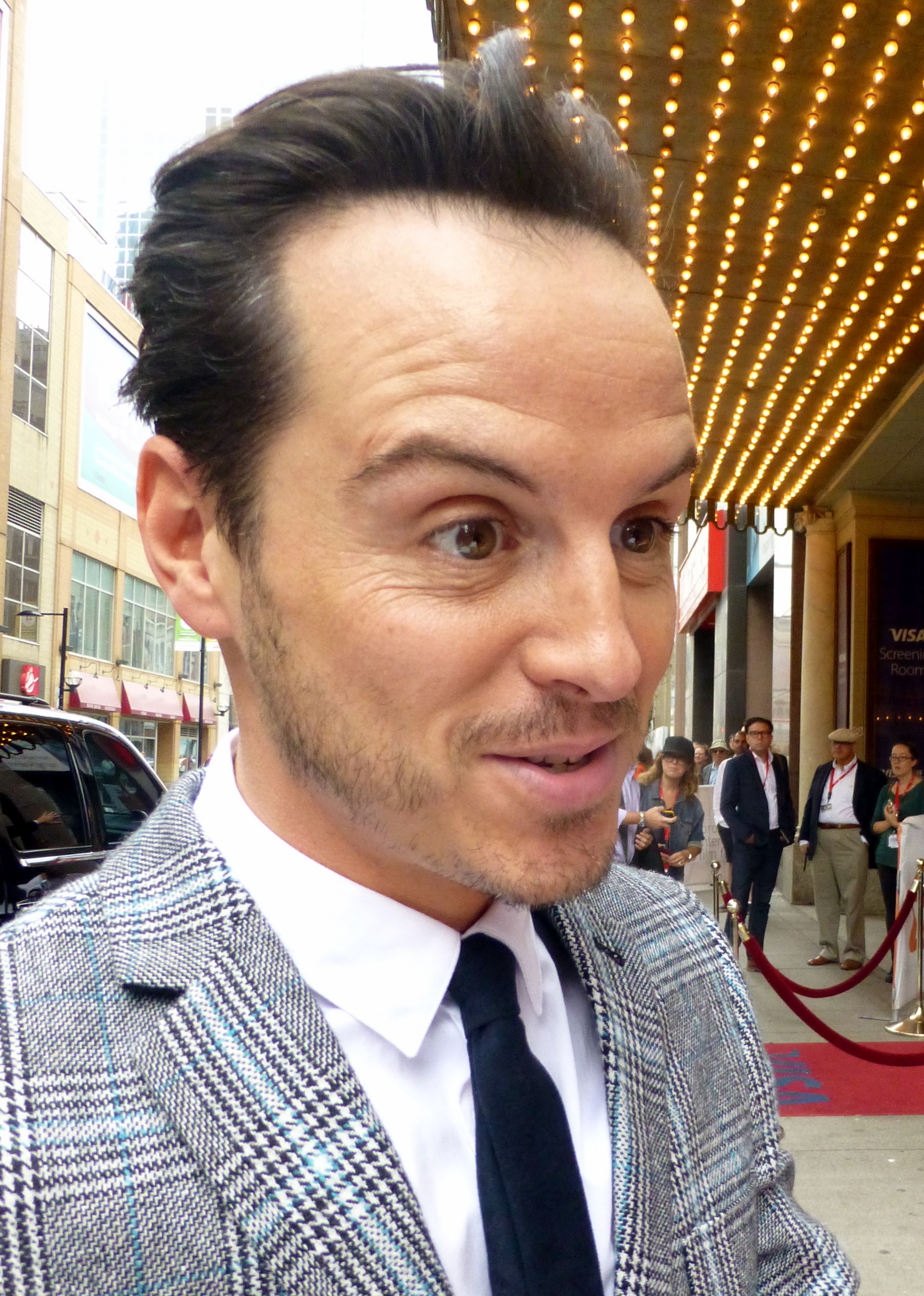
Andrew Scott plays James Jim Moriarty

James "Jim" Moriarty (Andrew Scott) is a "consulting criminal", a counterpoint to Sherlock's similarly unrivaled "consulting detective". He is responsible for the criminals and crimes in all three episodes of the first series, acting as a sponsor, an informant, or a mastermind. His interest in Sherlock borders on obsession, though he does not hesitate trying to kill him when he loses interest. Like Sherlock, he possesses a genius level intellect and appears to be motivated by relieving boredom rather than money or power.

He is an excellent actor, frequently shown to have convinced others that he is someone else – indeed his first appearance occurs as a gay man whom Molly is seeing, and Sherlock does not realise his identity at the time. In "The Great Game", Moriarty forces Sherlock to solve mysteries within a time limit, taking hostages to ensure that Sherlock is sufficiently motivated.

In the second series, he continues in his role as consulting criminal, giving Irene Adler advice on how to manipulate "The Holmes Boys", having given them both nicknames. It is mentioned that he asked for nothing in return, becoming involved just to cause trouble. He is seen briefly at the end of "The Hounds of Baskerville" apparently having been captured and in the process of being released by Mycroft.

Moriarty features extensively in the second series finale "The Reichenbach Fall", where he simultaneously breaks into the Tower of London, HMP Pentonville and the Bank of England, using some sort of master key code. He is tried but acquitted after intimidating the Jury. He then pretends to be an actor named Richard Brook and manipulates journalist Kitty Riley as well as the general populace into thinking he has been forced by Sherlock into portraying Jim Moriarty. After revealing to Sherlock that the key was a hoax, he attempts to force Sherlock into committing suicide in order to save his friends, but when Sherlock realises there is a way out as long as Moriarty is alive, Moriarty shoots himself in the head.

Moriarty appears in the third series in either flashbacks, alternative scenarios, or Sherlock's "mind palace" vignettes. It is revealed that Sherlock had spent two years dismantling Moriarty's network. In the closing moments of the third-series finale, "His Last Vow", Moriarty's face appears on televisions across Britain repeating the statement "Did you miss me?" Sherlock, who had just been sent on an intelligence mission that was guaranteed to result in his death, was immediately recalled to face his nemesis' schemes once more.

In the special episode "The Abominable Bride", set in Victorian era, Moriarty and Sherlock confront at Baker Street and the Reichenbach Falls. The whole conversation is just a part of Sherlock's dream in his mind palace. During this dream, the figment of Moriarty appears to almost succeed in killing Sherlock.

Moriarty appears briefly in some of the fourth series episodes. Although Sherlock confirms that Moriarty is definitely dead, his image saying "Did you miss me?" recurs. In "The Final Problem", it is revealed that Moriarty had arranged with Mycroft to meet with Eurus Holmes for five minutes unsupervised, during which they collaborated.

=== Irene Adler ===
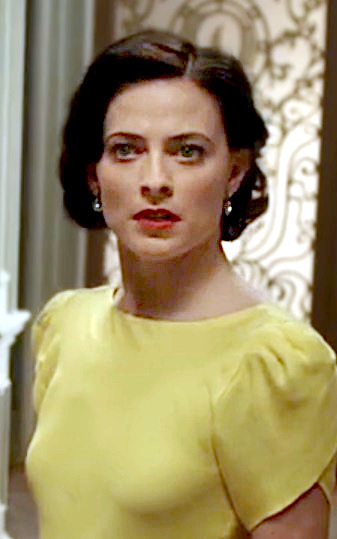
Lara Pulver plays Irene Adler

Irene Adler (Lara Pulver) is featured in "A Scandal in Belgravia" as a dominatrix, known professionally as "The Woman". She takes pictures of her clients during her job as "protection" to make sure her clients don't do anything unfavourable to her. Irene is brilliant enough to impress Sherlock, and managed to deceive him; her downfall proves to be falling in love with him. She sends Sherlock a series of flirtatious texts, repeatedly requesting to "have dinner" with him.

Having taken a picture of the information for "Bond Air", she was targeted by Americans, who were working with the British government to trick terrorists into thinking that their bomb would blow up a plane and take the lives of hundreds. She was also sought out by Mycroft for incriminating photos of herself and one of her clients, a young (and female) member of the House of Windsor. She contacted Moriarty about the Bond Air plan, being given advice on how to use it to her advantage. She successfully duped Sherlock into revealing what Bond Air was about, texting the answer to Moriarty, who informed the terrorists.

Facing off with both the "Holmes Boys", Irene attempted to get a list of demands fulfilled; Sherlock figured out the password to her phone – "I am SHER-Locked". With her protection gone, Irene was left to the mercy of any who were after her. Though it was reported she was beheaded by extremists in Karachi some time later, Sherlock had helped her fake her death.

She makes a return in "The Sign of Three", as a mental image when Sherlock thinks of those who know John's middle name; he tells the image "Out of my head, I'm busy". In "His Last Vow", when Charles Augustus Magnussen is "reading" Sherlock's list of pressure points (weaknesses), the list on the screen scrolls on for some time (and Magnussen mocks Sherlock by saying that he has "rather a lot"). Actually, there are only six pressure points listed, and to achieve the effect of there being many of them, they are repeated several times. They are: Irene Adler (See File); Jim Moriarty (See File); Redbeard (See File); Hounds of the Baskerville; Opium; and John Watson. She was later mentioned by Jim Moriarty in a scene taking place in Sherlock's mind palace, when he tells Sherlock that "... Mummy and Daddy will cry ... and The Woman will cry" in a surreal sequence where Sherlock, who is suffering from a near-fatal gunshot wound and has retreated to his mind palace to find a way to keep himself alive, imagines himself in a room where Moriarty is chained. Her picture is also seen during "The Abominable Bride" where Sherlock keeps it inside his watch. She is mentioned again in "The Lying Detective", when her text alert noise comes on during Sherlock and John's conversation. Sherlock admits she still texts him, and states that sometimes he replies even though he tries not to.

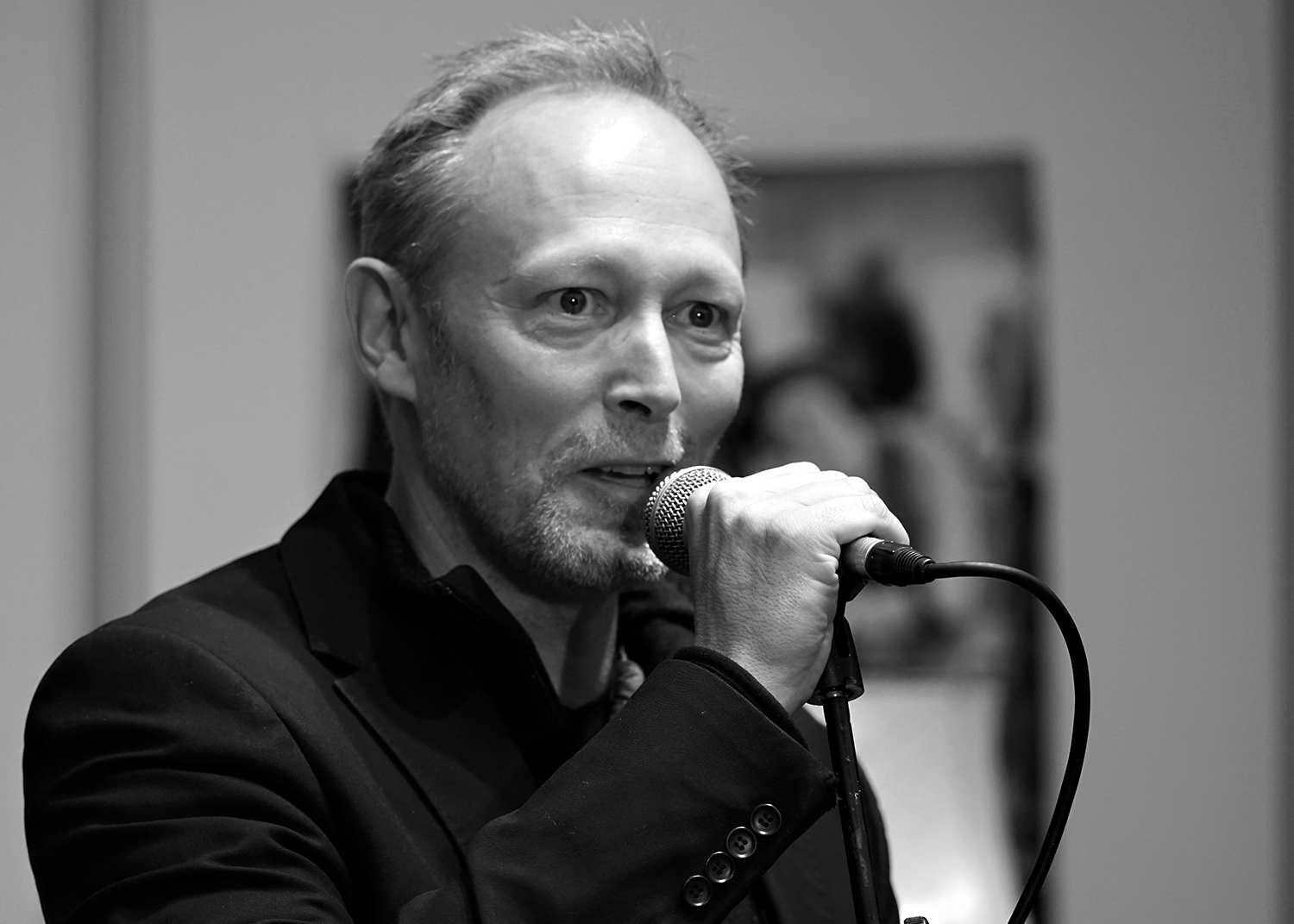
Lars Mikkelsen plays Charles Augustus Magnussen

=== Charles Augustus Magnussen ===
Charles Augustus Magnussen (Lars Mikkelsen), who is shown briefly in "The Empty Hearse" and appears prominently in "His Last Vow", is a powerful businessman who controls a media empire. He holds information on many people of prominence, allowing him to use such information for blackmail purposes in order to achieve his goals; Sherlock has nicknamed him "the Napoleon of Blackmail" and is repulsed by him, far more than any killer he has dealt with. Like Sherlock, he uses the mind palace technique to store the information in his head, keeping no hard copies or physical evidence with him unless he specifically needs to have them obtained. Magnussen is based on the original character of Charles Augustus Milverton, the titular character of the short story "The Adventure of Charles Augustus Milverton". In "The Sign of Three", he sends a telegram to the Watsons' wedding, signing it "CAM", which are his initials. In "His Last Vow", Magnussen reveals he placed John Watson in the bonfire in "The Empty Hearse", to confirm that Watson is one of Sherlock's pressure points. Knowing this link, he has gathered blackmail information on Mary Watson to control John Watson, thus giving him control of Sherlock, hoping to gain power over Mycroft, and by extension, the entire British Government. Sherlock prevents his doing so and frees everyone from his power by shooting Magnussen in the head, having failed to successfully trap him. In "The Six Thatchers", Mycroft arranges for the video footage of Magnussen's death to be doctored so it would appear that he was shot by "some overeager squaddie with an itchy trigger finger", clearing Sherlock of his murder.

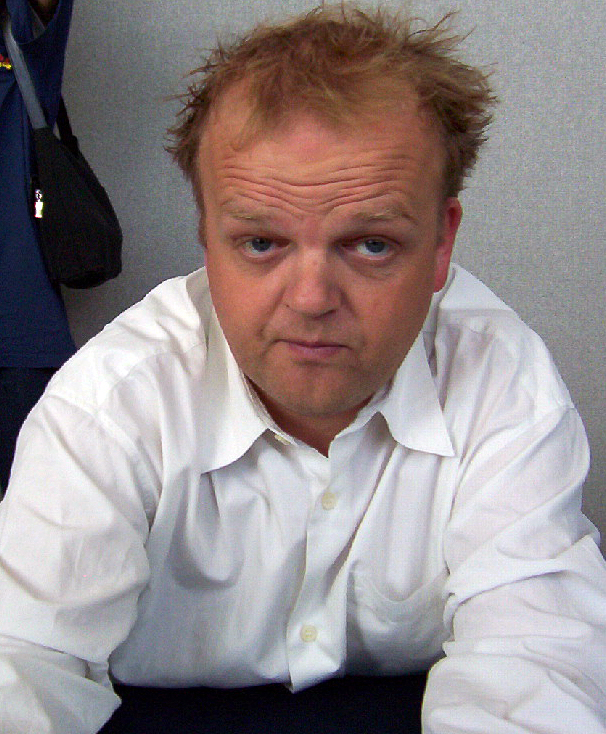
Toby Jones portrays Culverton Smith

=== Culverton Smith ===
Culverton Smith (Toby Jones), is featured in "The Lying Detective". A prominent entrepreneur and philanthropist, Smith is secretly a serial killer, who doesn't kill out of hate or love, but for the pleasure of killing. Using his wealth and unassailable power, he is able to use his charity-funded hospital as a way to go into patient's rooms and then kill them, taking inspiration from H. H. Holmes. Smith also has an uncontrollable need to confess to his crimes, going as far as to confess to his closest friends, even his daughter Faith, but making them forget his crimes through the use of memory inhibiting drugs, and even phrases his advertisements to the public in ways that indirectly say that he is a serial killer. Sherlock comes up against Smith when Faith gives him a slip of paper that she wrote down, reminding her of fragments of the crimes Smith told her. Sherlock comes to suspect Smith of being a serial killer, garnering media attention, which forces Sherlock and John to go with Smith to his hospital. After Sherlock tries to attack Smith with a scalpel, he is taken in as a patient to recuperate from drugs. Smith attempts to kill Sherlock, believing him to be a threat. Sherlock manages to make Smith confess, and his confession is recorded, and thus Smith is arrested. After being interrogated by Lestrade, Smith finds that confessing was more enjoyable than he imagined, and "should've done it sooner". He also realizes that this confession will make him even more famous, and that he may be able to "break America". He is based on the original character "Culverton Smith", the villain in "The Adventure of the Dying Detective".

=== Eurus Holmes ===
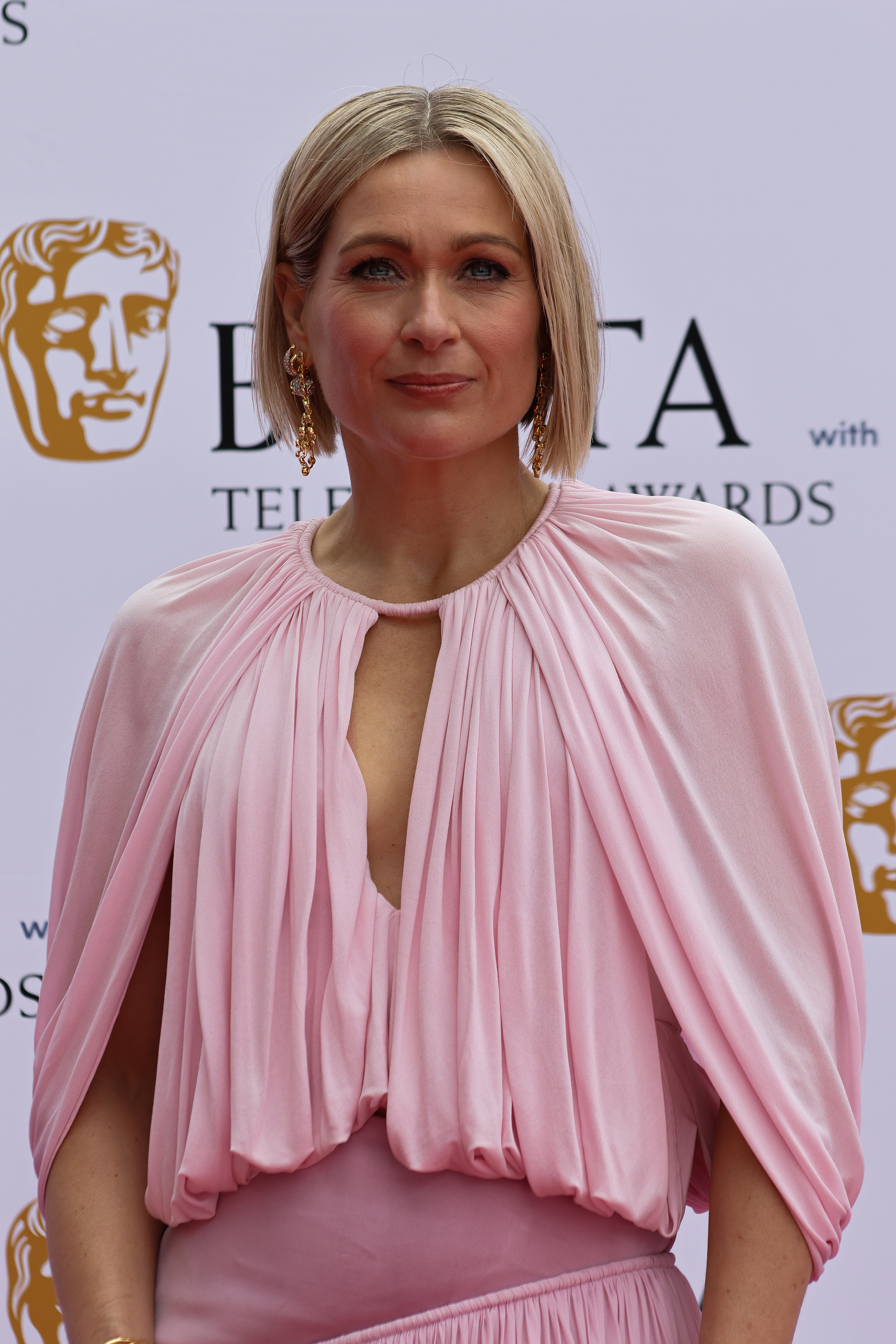
Siân Brooke plays Eurus Holmes

Eurus Holmes (Sian Brooke, and by Indica Watson as a child) is Sherlock and Mycroft's "secret" sister. Eurus is indirectly referred to in "His Last Vow"; when discussing Sherlock, Mycroft declares "I am not given to outbursts of brotherly compassion. You know what happened to the other one". She first appears in disguise in "The Six Thatchers" as a potential romantic interest for Watson, and then in two alternate disguises: Watson's therapist and Faith Smith in "The Lying Detective". She reveals her true identity in the conclusion of the episode, shooting Watson with a tranquilizer dart.

In "The Final Problem", Mycroft explains that Eurus is their estranged younger sister, and the youngest child of Mr and Mrs Holmes, who possesses a transcendent intellect greater than even that of Isaac Newton. For all her intelligence however, she is unable to comprehend human feeling. Mycroft recalls that once she even slit her own arms open to better understand the functioning of her muscles, not understanding the pain it caused her ("Which one is pain?"). She was later institutionalised after murdering Sherlock's childhood best friend Victor Trevor and burning down the Holmes estate. Later in life, upon Mycroft's recommendation, she was transferred to Sherrinford, a maximum security psychiatric facility located on an island. As a cover up, her death was faked as another instance of arson. Despite the dangers she posed, Eurus was occasionally consulted for her amazing intellect, predicting the dates of three major attempted terrorist attacks on Britain after an hour of browsing on Twitter, in exchange for 'treats' (including five minutes of unsupervised conversation with Moriarty). Having taken control of the Sherrinford staff through her manipulative and intellectual prowess, Eurus traps Sherlock, Dr Watson, and Mycroft in the ward, and forces them to play "games" that exploit their senses of morality under high-stakes and high-pressure. This culminates in Eurus asking Sherlock to shoot either Mycroft or Dr Watson. Being unable to decide however, Sherlock elects to shoot himself, causing Eurus to instead tranquilize all three.

Sherlock and Watson wake up at the remains of the old Holmes estate, trapped in different rooms. Eurus continues the game, this time with Watson's life on the line. Sherlock realizes that the only clue Eurus provided Sherlock about the death of his best friend as a child, a seemingly meaningless nursery rhyme, actually corresponds to a code for the names and dates of the gravestones on the estate. The cipher reveals that Eurus drowned Sherlock's best friend in a well, which is also where she has now trapped Watson. Simultaneously, Sherlock realizes that the phone calls with a scared girl on a pilotless plane he has been provided with as a reward for solving Eurus' puzzles are a metaphor for her loneliness as a child and an adult as a result of her excessive cognitive capacities, and finally provides Eurus with the brotherly love she had been so desperately wanting. Upon her change of heart, the two rescue Watson. She is returned to Sherrinford, where she is re-institutionalised. She elects not to speak to people anymore, though Sherlock visits her with a violin and she responds by playing a duet.

== Other recurring characters ==
=== Anthea ===
Anthea (Lisa McAllister) is an assistant to Mycroft Holmes, who appears in "A Study in Pink", "A Scandal in Belgravia", and "The Empty Hearse". She picks the name at random when John asks what he should call her.

=== Janine Hawkins ===
Janine Hawkins (Yasmine Akram) is Mary Morstan's bridesmaid in "The Sign of Three". She is the personal assistant of Magnussen, the villain of "His Last Vow", in which it is revealed that both Mary and Sherlock independently befriended her in order to get access to him. Sherlock went so far as to enter a relationship with her. He had kept her at arm's length the entire time, not wanting her to be involved too much; he even pretended that he worked night shifts, so he couldn't engage in any sexual encounters with her. Pretending to propose to her, Sherlock succeeds in getting into Magnussen's penthouse; however, Mary had rendered Janine unconscious moments before.

During their final encounter, Janine admits that she has made a lot of money since then by going on talk shows about her relationship with the famous detective, and had bought herself a nice cottage in Sussex. It is unclear whether that was her original intention or improvised for revenge. Most of the stories that she publicized were made-up to sell better. Sherlock and Janine agree that this makes them even, and she leaves amicably, although she insists that he should not have lied to her.

Janine also appears in a cameo in "The Abominable Bride", as a member of the sororital conspiracy Sherlock discovers.

=== Mr. and Mrs. Holmes ===
Mr. and Mrs. Holmes (Timothy Carlton and Wanda Ventham, the real-life parents of Benedict Cumberbatch), Sherlock, Mycroft, and Eurus' parents, appear in Series Three and Four. They are introduced in "The Empty Hearse" when John comes into the flat at Baker Street to find an older couple seated in the sitting room, speaking to Sherlock. He assumes that this couple are clients, but Sherlock's conversation with them eventually implies that they know one another. After they leave, Sherlock explains to John that they are in fact his parents. John is hurt when he discovers that the reason that Mr. and Mrs. Holmes did not attend Sherlock's funeral was because Sherlock had told them, unlike John, that he was alive.

Mr. and Mrs. Holmes are shown to be patient and accepting parents to their highly intelligent but socially impaired sons. As the two of them chat with Sherlock during the scene in which they are first introduced, neither parent appears too surprised when Sherlock abruptly steps up onto the coffee table, using it as a step so he can climb onto the couch to work on a complex chart he is using to help him with an ongoing case. As he stands between them, working on this visual aid, his mother simply looks up at him and continues talking as if she does not even notice his unusual behavior. His father sighs and looks a bit annoyed, but remains polite.

Mr. and Mrs. Holmes also appear later in Series Three, in "His Last Vow". They are featured when John and Mary join the Holmes brothers at their parents' house for a somewhat awkward Christmas dinner before John and Sherlock travel to Appledore to seek out Magnussen's incriminating materials on Mary. Despite her great love for her boys, Mrs. Holmes is shown apparently not to fully understand, or not fully care about Mycroft's role in international security; when he complains that she has gotten potatoes on his laptop, "on which depends the security of the free world", she simply tells him that he "shouldn't leave it lying around if it's so important". It is from their mother, though, that the Holmes brothers get their great intellect; that Christmas, Mrs. Holmes is shown to have written a mathematical book on fluid mechanics. Mr. Holmes, though not a genius, seems almost to fill a John-like role as, as Mary Watson puts it, the "sane one". Both the Holmes parents seem to immediately love and accept Mary, who may represent something of a daughter-in-law to them, as neither of their own sons seem likely to marry or have children.

=== Lady Smallwood ===
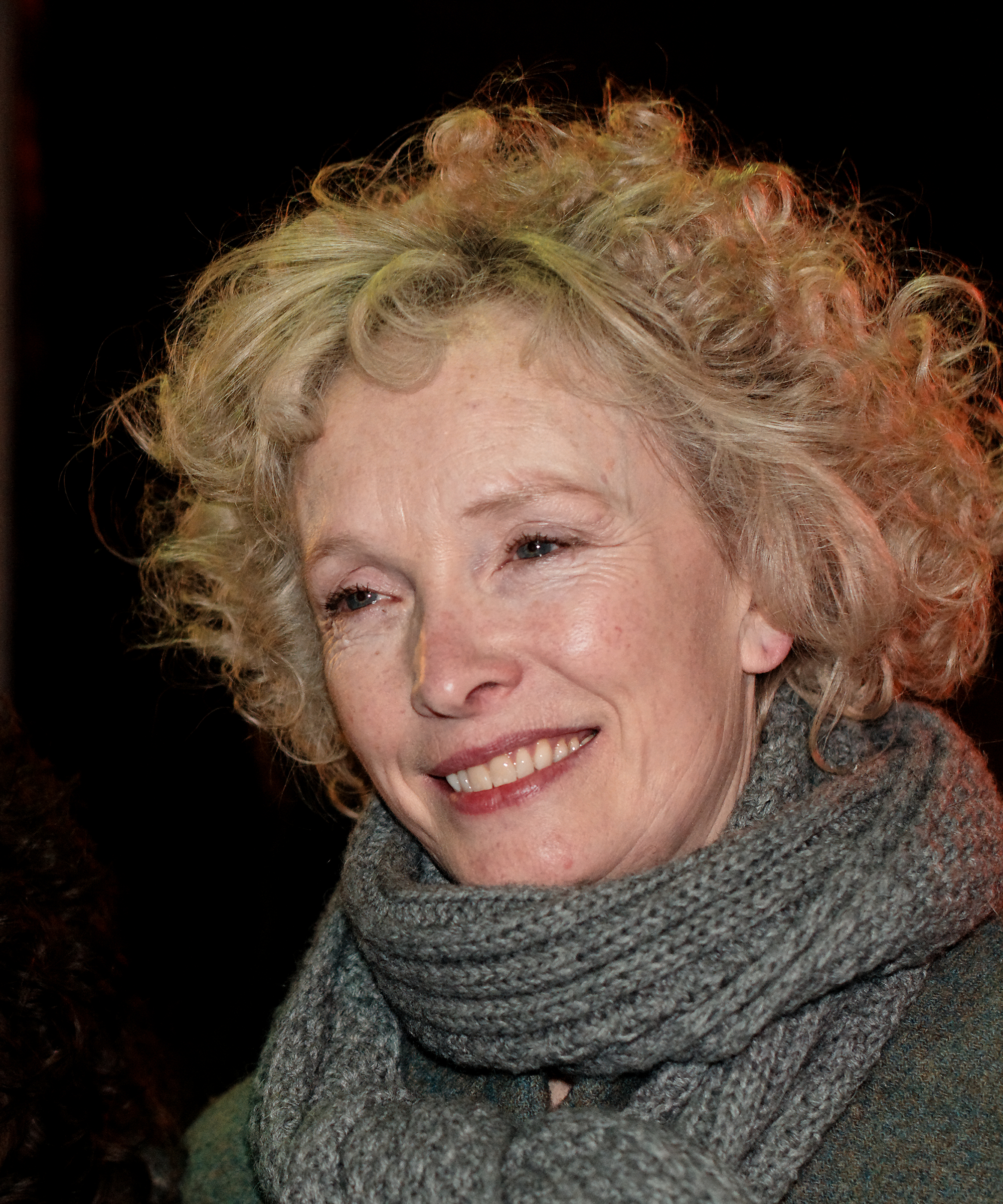
Lindsay Duncan plays Lady Smallwood

Lady Alicia Smallwood (Lindsay Duncan) is a member of the Cabinet Office and a colleague of Mycroft Holmes. She first appears in "His Last Vow" (although under the first name of Elizabeth), where she leads an inquiry onto the activities of media magnate Charles Augustus Magnussen, though he eventually blackmailed her into ceasing the investigation via her husband's sexual letters to an underage girl. She consults Sherlock into retrieving the letters from Magnussen, leading to Sherlock shooting him, when he discovers that Magnussen's knowledge of the letters (in addition to all his other blackmail material) were in his mind palace. Following Magnussen's death, she authorizes the punishment of Sherlock by being flown to a certain-death mission in Eastern Europe. When Moriarty reappears on every television in the country, she authorizes Sherlock's return to England to deal with Moriarty.

Lady Smallwood reappears in "The Six Thatchers", in a meeting with Sherlock, Mycroft, her secretary Vivian Norbury, and Sir Edwin. In the meeting, she reveals that footage of him executing Magnussen has been digitally altered to make a police sniper appear to be the shooter instead, effectively letting him "off the hook", rather than officially pardoning him. She reappears later in the episode when she is brought into questioning by Mycroft following the connection between her codename, "Love", and the codename, "Amo" (the Latin word for "love") used in a rescue operation in the British Embassy in Tbilisi which resulted in the British ambassador and several private military contractors (led by Mary Watson) being massacred. She is later proven innocent, when it is revealed that her secretary, Vivian Norbury (who had been selling secrets), was behind the mission sabotage.

Smallwood later appears in "The Lying Detective", when she and Mycroft are tracking Sherlock when he is leaving his flat under the influence of drugs. She later questions Mycroft on "Sherrinford", to which he replies that "Sherrinford" is secure. She also gives Mycroft her personal number and suggests they go out for a drink.
