= A Study in Pink =

- Sherlock episode
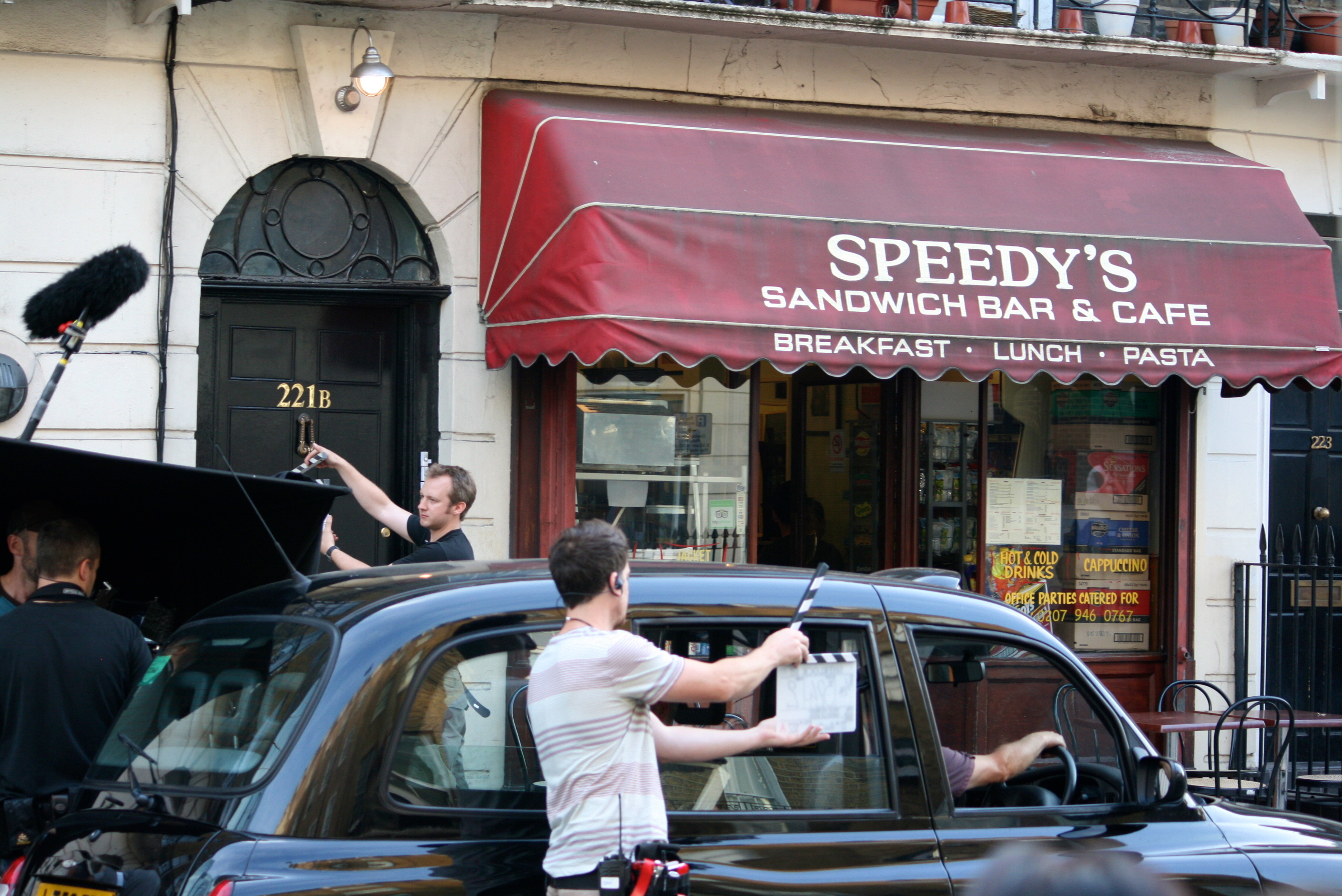
- Episode no.: Series 1 Episode 1
- Directed by: Paul McGuigan
- Written by: Steven Moffat
- Based on: A Study in Scarlet by Arthur Conan Doyle
- Cinematography by: Steve Lawes
- Editing by: Mali Evans; Charlie Phillips
- Original air date: 25 July 2010
- Running time: 88 minutes

Guest appearances
- Mark Gatiss as Mycroft Holmes; Louise Brealey as Molly Hooper; Vinette Robinson as Sgt Sally Donovan; Jonathan Aris as Anderson; Phil Davis as Jeff Hope (cab driver); David Nellist as Mike Stamford; Lisa McAllister as Anthea

Episode chronology
← Previous —	Next → "The Blind Banker"

"A Study in Pink" is the first episode of the television series Sherlock and first broadcast on BBC One and BBC HD on 25 July 2010. It introduces the main characters and resolves a murder mystery. It is loosely based upon the first Sherlock Holmes novel, A Study in Scarlet.

The episode was written by Steven Moffat, who co-created the series. It was originally filmed as a 60-minute pilot for Sherlock, directed by Coky Giedroyc. The BBC decided not to transmit the pilot, but instead commissioned a series of three 90-minute episodes. The story was refilmed, this time directed by Paul McGuigan. The British Board of Film Classification has rated the pilot as a 12 certificate (not suitable for children under 12) for video and online exhibition, and it is included as an additional feature on the DVD released on 30 August 2010.

== Plot ==
John Watson, an army doctor injured in Afghanistan, meets Sherlock Holmes, who is looking for someone to share a flat at 221B Baker Street, owned by landlady Mrs. Hudson. The police, led by Detective Inspector Lestrade, have been baffled by a series of deaths, described as "serial suicides". Sherlock is invited to inspect the latest crime scene, that of a woman dressed exclusively in pink, who managed to claw the letters "R-a-c-h-e" into the floor before dying. Sherlock deduces that the word was "Rachel" and that the woman was from out of town; observing that her luggage is not at the crime scene, he searches the neighborhood until he finds it, discarded by the killer. The luggage tag reveals her name to have been Jennifer Wilson and gives her phone number. With this information Sherlock learns that Rachel was the name of Wilson's deceased daughter. Meanwhile, John is compelled to meet a man who claims to be Sherlock's "arch-enemy". The man offers him money to spy on Sherlock, but John refuses. The man also tells John that, contrary to what his therapist believes, John is not suffering from post-traumatic stress disorder but in fact misses being in combat.

When John returns to Baker Street, Sherlock asks him to text Wilson's still-missing phone, hoping the murderer will make a move. Sherlock presumes that Wilson planted her phone on the killer so that he could be traced by GPS; correctly assuming that "Rachel" was her password, he initiates such a search through her online account and finds the signal at 221B Baker Street. Sherlock finds a taxi waiting for him on the street, and the cabbie confesses to the murders but proclaims he merely speaks to his victims, and they kill themselves. The cabbie challenges Sherlock to play his game, and drives him to a secluded location. Once there he reveals two bottles, each containing an identical-looking pill: one is harmless, the other is poison. To play the game, he invites his victims to choose one, promising he will swallow the other — and he threatens to shoot them if they refuse.

Sherlock soon deduces that the driver is an estranged father who was told three years earlier he was dying. The driver admits that he has a "sponsor" for his "work", receiving money for his children for each murder. Sherlock, having noticed that the gun is a novelty cigarette lighter, attempts to leave. However, the driver re-challenges him to choose a pill and see if he can beat the cabbie at the game. Meanwhile, John has traced the GPS signal from the phone and followed the two men. He shoots the driver through a window in the adjacent building before Sherlock can swallow the pill he had chosen. Sherlock demands that the cabbie reveal whether he chose the safe pill and the name of his sponsor. The cabbie only yells out "Moriarty" before dying. The police arrive, and Sherlock deduces that the shooter is John, but hides the truth from the police. Sherlock and John leave the scene, encountering Sherlock's enigmatic "arch-enemy", who is revealed to be Sherlock's elder brother, Mycroft, who works for the British government. John discovers that Mycroft tried to bribe him out of genuine concern for Sherlock. Mycroft instructs his assistant to increase their surveillance status.

== Allusions ==
The episode is loosely based on A Study in Scarlet and contains allusions to other works by Arthur Conan Doyle. Moffat said of "A Study in Pink" and A Study in Scarlet: "there are many elements of the story, and the broad shape of it, but we mess around with it a lot". Tom Sutcliffe of The Independent points out, "Fans will recognise at once that the close-reading Sherlock applies to John's mobile phone is drawn from an almost identical analysis of a pocket watch [taken from The Sign of the Four]. More slyly oblique is the conversion of the lost ring that Holmes uses to lure the killer in A Study in Scarlet into a lost 'ring', a mobile phone that can be used to contact the killer directly." The episode also uses an identical clue to the original story, but gives it a different meaning: both stories feature "Rache" written at the scene of the crime. In the original story, Holmes dismisses a suggestion that the victim was trying to write "Rachel", instead pointing out that "Rache" is German for "revenge". In this version, Holmes's interpretation is reversed: he scoffs at the "revenge" explanation and suggests the victim was trying to write "Rachel". The "three-patch problem" that Holmes describes is similar to the term "three-pipe problem" he uses in "The Red-Headed League".

== Production ==
The story was originally filmed as a 60-minute pilot for Sherlock, directed by Coky Giedroyc. It was planned to be broadcast in mid- to late 2009. The intention was to produce a full series should the pilot prove to be successful. However, the first version of the pilot – reported to have cost £800,000 – led to rumours within the BBC and wider media that Sherlock was a potential disaster. The BBC decided not to transmit the pilot, requesting a reshoot and a total of three 90-minute episodes. The newly shot episode, says journalist Mark Lawson, was "substantially expanded and rewritten, and completely reimagined in look, pace and sound". The first series of Sherlock was produced in reverse order; "A Study in Pink" was the last of the three to be produced. This was because episode writer and co-creator Steven Moffat was busy with the fifth series of Doctor Who. Background information on Sherlock and Mycroft's relationship was cut out of the final episode as it was viewed as giving too much away. For the pilot, the roles of Sally Donovan and Angelo were portrayed by Zawe Ashton and Joseph Long respectively but were portrayed by Vinette Robinson and Stanley Townsend in the hour-and-a-half episode.

The episode was set in 2010 rather than the Victorian period and so used modern devices such as mobile phones, TX1 London cabs and nicotine patches rather than the traditional pipe and other period props. The change from a pipe to a nicotine patch reflected changing social attitudes and broadcasting regulations. Director Paul McGuigan says that using modern technology is in keeping with Conan Doyle's character, pointing out that "In the books he would use any device possible and he was always in the lab doing experiments. It's just a modern-day version of it. He will use the tools that are available to him today in order to find things out". Sherlock Holmes still lives at the same Baker Street address as in Conan Doyle's stories. However, it was filmed at 185 North Gower Street. Baker Street was impractical because of the number of things labeled "Sherlock Holmes", which would need to be disguised.

Filming on the pilot began in January 2009 on location in London and Cardiff. It was written by Moffat and directed by Coky Giedroyc. A seven-hour night shoot took place on 20/21 January at the No Sign bar in Wind Street, Swansea. The bar had been redesigned as an Italian restaurant for the shoot, where Holmes and Watson dined. Location managers selected the bar as the venue because they needed a building that could double as an Italian restaurant that was close to an alley. On 21 January, scenes were shot in Newport Road, Cardiff. Location shooting concluded on 23 January with scenes filmed on Baker Street, London. During that week, filming was also done on location in Merthyr Tydfil.

According to Moffat and Gatiss, the BBC liked the pilot so much that they ordered three 90-minute films. However, the pilot version of "A Study in Pink" had been produced as a 60-minute film. The producers felt that they could not simply add another half an hour to the episode—they had to film it again. Producer Sue Vertue adds that additional footage to increase the length would not have matched because a different director of photography and a superior camera were used when filming the series.

== Broadcast ==
"A Study in Pink" was first broadcast on BBC One on 25 July 2010. Overnight viewing figures showed that the episode was watched by a total of 7.5 million viewers on BBC One and BBC HD. Final viewing figures were up to 9.23 million viewers and averaged a 28.5% share of the UK audience with a high AI rating of 87. The episode was downloaded 1.403 million times on BBC's online iPlayer, the third most-requested programme of 2010.

== Reception ==
The episode won a Peabody Award in 2010 "for bringing the beloved Victorian sleuth into the high-tech present while remaining faithful to his creator's original conception". It received critical acclaim. The Guardian's Dan Martin said, "It's early days, but the first of three 90-minute movies, "A Study in Pink", is brilliantly promising. It has the finesse of Spooks but is indisputably Sherlock Holmes. The deduction sequences are ingenious, and the plot is classic Moffat intricacy. Purists will take umbrage, as purists always do." However, Sam Wollaston, also for The Guardian, was concerned that some elements of the story were unexplained. Tom Sutcliffe for The Independent also suggests that Holmes was "a bit slow" to connect the attributes of the killer to a London taxicab driver, but his review is otherwise positive. He wrote, "Sherlock is a triumph, witty and knowing, without ever undercutting the flair and dazzle of the original. It understands that Holmes isn't really about plot but about charisma ... Flagrantly unfaithful to the original in some respects, Sherlock is wonderfully loyal to it in every way that matters". IGN's Chris Tilly rated the episode 7.8 out of 10, describing it as "an excellent 90-minute origin story wrapped in a rather uninspired mystery that fails to fully take flight". He was positive towards the introduction of the two lead characters and actors, but felt the mystery was "something of an anticlimax" and Inspector Lestrade was "the only weak link". Serena Davies of The Daily Telegraph particularly praised Cumberbatch and stated that the show "worked because it was having fun" and was "hugely enjoyable". Her only criticism was that Holmes was "too legible" and lacked the mystery previously seen in other portrayals of the character. The A.V. Club reviewer John Teti gave "A Study in Pink" a grade of a B, feeling that the modern-day upgrades were too forced and that the resolution was "overwrought". However, he praised the show for being "bold" and Freeman for being "eminently watchable", though the more youthful take on Holmes "[infected] the performances at times". Den of Geek selected "A Study in Pink" as one of the best TV episodes of 2010, describing it as "a masterclass in how to write an opening episode".
