= The Lying Detective =

- Sherlock episode
- Episode no.: Series 4 Episode 2
- Directed by: Nick Hurran
- Written by: Steven Moffat
- Based on: "The Adventure of the Dying Detective" by Arthur Conan Doyle
- Original air date: 8 January 2017
- Running time: 89 minutes

Guest appearances
- Toby Jones as Culverton Smith; Lindsay Duncan as Lady Smallwood; Sian Brooke as New Therapist/Eurus Holmes; Tom Brooke as Bill Wiggins; Katy Wix as Nurse Cornish; Chris Wilson as High Rank Police Officer; Gina Bramhill as Faith Smith

Episode chronology
← Previous "The Six Thatchers"	Next → "The Final Problem"

"The Lying Detective" is the second episode of the fourth series of the British television series Sherlock, and the twelfth episode overall. The episode was first broadcast on BBC One, BBC First, PBS and Channel One on 8 January 2017.

== Plot ==
Sherlock remains distant to Watson, who is still grieving over the death of his wife, Mary. John, who is seeing a new therapist, conceals the fact that he is having hallucinations of Mary. Culverton Smith, a prominent entrepreneur and philanthropist, gathers close colleagues, including his daughter, Faith, to confess that he is going to kill somebody. Before he does so, he forcibly injects them with a serum that inhibits memory. Faith is still able to remember fragments and writes them down on a sheet of paper. She comes to Sherlock, who has started abusing drugs again, and says that she remembers one word that shook her. Sherlock dismisses her case as being too weird and refers her to Scotland Yard.

Before Faith leaves, Sherlock realises that she is suicidal and offers to walk with her around London. Mycroft tracks Sherlock's movement across the city and calls John out of concern, accidentally implying existence of another Holmes sibling. Sherlock and Faith walk all night, and the following morning he decides to take her case. Sherlock is momentarily overwhelmed by the side effects of his drug use and, upon gathering himself, finds Faith gone. As Sherlock stumbles back to his flat, he realises that the "one word" was "anyone". Smith is a serial killer with the wealth and power to hide his crimes completely.

Sherlock becomes obsessed with Smith and publicly accuses him of being a serial killer, but his drug-addled antics frighten Mrs. Hudson. She subdues him and brings him to see John while he is at his therapist's house for a session. Much to John's shock and annoyance, the arrival at his therapist's house of a car sent by Smith and then of Molly Hooper with an ambulance were all prearranged by Sherlock two weeks prior, even before John had chosen his new therapist.

Sherlock and John are brought to a studio where they meet with Smith, who reveals he has used Sherlock's accusation as a publicity stunt to support his new brand of cereal, saying he's a "Cereal Killer". He claims Sherlock was in on the joke and then takes them to visit a new hospital wing for which he had been a major donor. Smith then takes Sherlock and John to his 'favourite room', whilst repeatedly mentioning 19th century serial killer H. H. Holmes. John asks Smith how he moves through all of the rooms freely, to which Smith replies that he has keys to the hospital.

As Sherlock tries to goad Smith into a confession, Faith arrives, having been texted by Sherlock from Smith's phone. Upon seeing her, Sherlock realises that she was not the woman who had come to his flat. Frustrated and suffering from withdrawal, Sherlock attacks Smith with a scalpel, but is stopped by John, who attacks Sherlock in anger, blaming him for Mary's death.

Sherlock is admitted into Smith's hospital, where John pays him a last visit. After John leaves, Smith enters Sherlock's room through a secret door. Sherlock asks Smith to kill him and directs him to change the dosage on his intravenous machine. Sherlock induces Smith to confess to his murders, and Smith begins to suffocate him. But Watson burst into the room, having been alerted by Mary's video, asking him to "save John Watson" by "going to Hell".

Unknown to Smith, the events were part of Sherlock's elaborate plot to expose Smith and fulfill Mary's last request. John pulls Smith off Sherlock. Smith claims he was trying to help Sherlock, but Sherlock reveals a recording device hidden in John's walking stick, which he had left behind earlier, that recorded Smith's boasting confession. While the recording might not be admissible evidence, Smith soon finds he enjoys confessing to Lestrade.

John reconciles with Sherlock, telling him that he no longer blames him for Mary's death. He also confesses to Sherlock – and to his hallucination of Mary – that he had cheated on her by texting with another woman. Sherlock comforts him as he weeps, and Mary finally disappears. After resuming taking cases, Sherlock discovers the note "Faith" had left behind, proving the woman was real and not a drug-induced hallucination. Upon inspecting the note under a black light Sherlock finds the message "Miss me?". During John's next session, his therapist reveals she was both the woman with whom he had been texting and the one who pretended to be Faith. Holding John at gunpoint, she reveals herself to be Eurus, Sherlock and Mycroft's secret sibling. As John attempts to leave, Eurus pulls the trigger.

== Production ==
The episode was based loosely on the Doyle short story "The Adventure of the Dying Detective". The villain, Culverton Smith, was loosely based on disgraced British entertainer and charity fundraiser Jimmy Savile, who was exposed as a prolific predatory sex offender in 2012. Sam Wolfson of The Guardian noted that the Savile-esque character must have caused consternation behind the scenes at the BBC. Wolfson gave "a respectful nod to the BBC," writing, "There must have been some unease in the corporation about having an episode in their flagship drama series in which a beloved public figure... uses his position of power and fame to commit monstrous crimes."

== Broadcast and reception ==
The episode received positive reviews from critics. Kaite Welsh of IndieWire graded "The Lying Detective" an A+, particularly the plotline of Sherlock descending into drug addiction: "He really does turn his kitchen into a meth lab, he is weeks away from death and hallucinating. It's the flip side of the genius that carries the show."

Vox rated the episode 3.5/5 stars. Sean O'Grady of The Independent gave the episode 4/5 stars, describing it as "Rarely can drama have come so morbidly loaded as last night's Sherlock, and rarely carry so much morbid fascination for the viewer". IGN gave the episode a good rating with a 7/10, describing it as "hampered by another unsatisfying case and some odd story beats".

Allison Shoemaker of The A.V. Club praised the episode and the story, grading it a B+, writing, "'The Lying Detective' does what it does so dazzlingly well that it's easy to overlook its misses... It's got a couple of good twists, some familiar to readers of the stories and others not. It's affecting and funny and moving and smart, and in short, a great script. But just because something checks all the right boxes doesn't mean it totally works, and Steven Moffat's script falls a bit flat where it really counts. It's as if he's blinded to the big picture by his own considerable gifts. This is a great Sherlock/Watson story with time to spare for everything but them."
