= Steve Thompson (writer) =

British screenwriter & playwright (born 1967)

- Born: Stephen Thompson; 1967 (age 58–59)
- Occupations: Screenwriter, playwright
- Years active: 2004–present
- Known for: Lynley; Vienna Blood; Sherlock; Doctor Who

Stephen Thompson (born 1967) is a British playwright and screenwriter.

== Background ==
Thompson studied at the University of Warwick. He gained a maths degree but also did some English studies in his third year. Thompson worked as a maths teacher for twelve years at Tiffin School, and was head of maths.

Thompson left teaching in 2000 and became a full-time dad and house husband to his children. He has stated this was because his wife was earning much more money than him. Thompson is married to the media barrister Lorna Skinner and they have five children.

== Career ==
In an interview, Thompson said "I took a sudden left turn and became a scriptwriter.” He trained on the RADA playwrights' course, and his first play, Damages, was performed at the Bush Theatre in 2004, winning the Meyer-Whitworth Award for new writing.

In 2005, he was made Pearson writer in residence at the Bush Theatre where his next play Whipping It Up was also performed. Roaring Trade was performed by Paines Plough at the Soho Theatre. His most recent play No Naughty Bits was performed at Hampstead Theatre in September 2011.

His first credit for television came on the medical soap Doctors in 2005. Since then, he has contributed scripts for several popular shows, including Silk, Upstairs Downstairs, Doctor Who, and the first three series of Sherlock (the latter two both in collaboration with Steven Moffat). In 2016, he created the period drama series Jericho, which re-imagines the building of the Ribblehead Viaduct as a British Western. In April 2016, ITV confirmed that a second series of Jericho was not going to be commissioned.

On 3 October 2018, it was announced that Thompson would be teaming with Frank Spotnitz to develop a drama about Leonardo da Vinci. On 17 February 2019, it was revealed that Thompson was developing an adaptation of Runestaff for BBC. On 16 August 2019, the BBC announced they would broadcast Thompson's adaptation of the popular Liebermann novels by Frank Tallis, Vienna Blood. On 6 July 2020, Endor Productions and MR Film announced that a second series had been jointly recommissioned by ORF, ZDF, BBC and PBS. On 22 February 2022, a third series was commissioned, and then later a fourth and final series.

In 2025, Thompson created the Apple TV+ thriller series Prime Target, on which he also served as writer and executive producer. The series stars Leo Woodall as Edward Brooks, a Cambridge mathematics postgraduate whose research into patterns in prime numbers entangles him in a conspiracy over their potential use in breaking modern cryptographic systems. The series has been noted in early critical discussion for its blend of high-concept mathematics-driven plotting with conspiracy thriller tropes.

Later in 2025, Britbox streamed Thompson's adaptation of the Inspector Lynley series by Elizabeth George, starring Leo Suter. It would then air on BBC One in January 2026. On 30 March 2026, BritBox announced a second season.

== Bibliography ==
- Damages, Josef Weinberger Plays, 2004.
- Whipping It Up, Nick Hern Books, 2006.
- Roaring Trade, Nick Hern Books, 2009.
- No Naughty Bits, Nick Hern Books, 2011.

== Television writing credits ==
Production	Episodes	Broadcaster
Doctors	"Criminal Negligence" (2005); "Sport for All" (2005)	BBC One
The Whistleblowers	"No Child Left Behind" (2007)	ITV
Mutual Friends	Episode 5 (2008)	BBC One
Sherlock	"The Blind Banker" (2010); "The Reichenbach Fall" (2012); "The Sign of Three" (co-written with Mark Gatiss and Steven Moffat) (2014)	BBC One
Silk	"Episode #1.5" (2011)	BBC One
Doctor Who	"The Curse of the Black Spot" (2011); "Journey to the Centre of the TARDIS" (2013); "Time Heist" (co-written with Steven Moffat) (2014)	BBC One
Upstairs Downstairs	"All The Things You Are" (2012)	BBC One
Sinbad	"House of Games" (2012)	Sky1
Jericho	Series creator, 5 episodes (2016)	ITV
Deep State	"Reunion" (2018); "Stories" (2018); "The New Normal" (co-written with Matthew Parkhill) (2019)	Fox
Vienna Blood	Series creator, all episodes (2019-2024)	BBC Two
Leonardo	Series co-creator, 4 episodes (2021)	Rai 1
Prime Target	Series creator, 7 episodes (2025)	Apple TV+
Lynley	Series creator, all episodes (2025-present)	BBC One/Britbox
Young Sherlock	"The Case of the Burnt Photograph" (2026); "The Case of the Missing Button" (2026)	Amazon Prime Video
