= The Blind Banker =

- Sherlock episode
- Title card of the episode
- Episode no.: Series 1 Episode 2
- Directed by: Euros Lyn
- Written by: Stephen Thompson
- Based on: "The Adventure of the Dancing Men" by Arthur Conan Doyle
- Cinematography by: Steve Lawes
- Original air date: 1 August 2010
- Running time: 88 minutes

Guest appearances
- Louise Brealey as Molly Hooper; Zoe Telford as Sarah Sawyer; Gemma Chan as Soo Lin Yao; Paul Chequer as D.I. Dimmock; Bertie Carvel as Seb Wilkes; Daniel Percival as Eddie Van Coon; Al Weaver as Andy Galbraith; Howard Coggins as Brian Lukis; Janice Acquah as Museum Director; Jack Bence as Raz; John MacMillan as Community Police Officer; Olivia Poulet as Amanda

Episode chronology
← Previous "A Study in Pink"	Next → "The Great Game"

"The Blind Banker" is the second episode of the television series Sherlock, first broadcast on BBC One and BBC HD on 1 August 2010. It was written by Stephen Thompson and directed by Euros Lyn.

Sherlock is a loose adaptation of Arthur Conan Doyle's Sherlock Holmes stories, set in the modern day. "The Blind Banker" follows Sherlock (Benedict Cumberbatch) and John Watson (Martin Freeman) as they investigate a series of ciphers representing numbers in an ancient Chinese numeral system which have been left by a Chinese smuggling ring who are intent to kill to retrieve an item one of them stole.

It attracted 8.07 million viewers on BBC One and BBC HD. Critical reception was generally positive, though some reviewers felt it was inferior to the first episode. The episode was also criticised for its orientalist clichés.

== Plot ==
At the National Antiquities Museum, Chinese pottery expert Soo Lin Yao sees something frightening and disappears. Meanwhile, Sherlock takes John to a high-powered international finance house. There, Sebastian Wilkes, an old university acquaintance of Sherlock's, asks for help. A break-in occurred in which a seemingly meaningless pair of symbols were spray-painted onto a portrait of a banker. Sherlock realises it was a message meant for one man – Edward van Coon of the Hong Kong desk – who has not come to work. Sherlock breaks into van Coon's locked flat and finds him dead. The police, under Detective Inspector Dimmock, regard it as a suicide, though Sherlock sees it as murder. Soon, journalist Brian Lukis (Howard Coggins) is killed inside his locked flat. Sherlock and John investigate, and in a library where Lukis had been, they find the same mysterious symbols painted on a shelf.

John, seeking financial security, obtains a job as locum at a local surgery run by Dr. Sarah Sawyer. Later, Sherlock and John discover a link between the two men; both had just returned from China, and both went to an oriental curio shop, "The Lucky Cat". There, Holmes learns that the symbols are ancient Chinese Hangzhou numerals (correctly Suzhou numerals). Sherlock notices that Soo Lin's flat is empty and snoops around, where he finds an intruder; a brief fight ensues, but the attacker flees. At the museum, they then discover the same symbols on a statue. Then, with the help of graffiti artist "Raz", Sherlock and John find more symbols graffitied on a wall and struggle to decode the message. Back at the museum, Holmes surprises Soo Lin in hiding, who explains the code is linked to the criminal ring "Black Lotus Tong", of which she was once a member. Unfortunately, before she can fully decode the message, she is killed by her brother, another criminal gang member. Sherlock realises Van Coon and Lukis were members of the Tong, involved in smuggling valuable antiquities to sell in London. They were killed because one of them stole something.

Sherlock knows the message is in the form of a book cipher, and he and John spend the night going through the first two victims' books, trying to find the solution. John's first day at work does not go well, but Sarah covers for him, and they organise to go out on a date. Sherlock arranges tickets to a travelling Chinese circus. While John and Sarah enjoy the classic escapology and acrobatics acts, Sherlock snoops around backstage and is attacked, but with Sarah and John's help, the three escape. While Sherlock continues to search for the solution to the book cipher, John and Sarah are kidnapped; John is mistaken for Sherlock by the villains, who want him to reveal the location of the missing "treasure" in return for Sarah's life.

Fortunately, Sherlock cracks the code using an London A–Z guide, and rescues John and Sarah. He also realises the elusive "treasure" has been in plain sight all the time: A jade hairpin belonging to the Chinese royal family, worn by van Coon's secretary/mistress Amanda, who had received it as a gift from van Coon. However, Shan, the Black Lotus Tong's leader, escapes and contacts a person via online "chat" identified only by the initial "M" who had helped the gang to get a foothold in London. Shan states that even though they were compromised by Sherlock she will not reveal his identity. M responds with "I am certain" as a sniper's red dot settles on her forehead. As the screen goes black a shot is heard.

== Allusions ==
According to Moffat, the episode takes the concept of coded messages from "The Adventure of the Dancing Men" (using pictorial messages), a story feature directly referenced later, in the series 4 episode The Final Problem.

Alan Kistler of Newsarama has pointed out other potential inspirations such as the use in The Valley of Fear of a code "based on a book that many people would own." A murder victim found inside a locked room accessible only by climbing might be an allusion to The Sign of the Four.

== Broadcast and reception ==
"The Blind Banker" aired on BBC One on 1 August 2010. Overnight figures showed that the episode had been watched by 6.442 million viewers on BBC One, a 25.6% audience share, while 210,000 watched on BBC HD an hour later. Final consolidated figures rose to 8.07 million, with both BBC One and BBC HD taken into account.

=== Critical response ===
The episode received mixed to positive reviews from television critics. Sam Wollaston of The Guardian thought that "The Blind Banker" was better than the series opener, calling the plot "more satisfying ... clearer and more self-contained". He particularly praised the relationship between Sherlock and Watson. Radio Times reviewer David Butcher wrote that the episode "didn't have the scripting pizzazz of the others, but it did have one big advantage: Zoe Telford. She played a love interest for Martin Freeman's Dr Watson and briefly threatened to bring a strong female character into the mix — only to be wasted on damsel-in-distress duties. We can only hope creator Steven Moffat will bring her back for the second run". IGN's Chris Tilly rated the episode 7 out of 10, describing it as "a lacklustre effort that fails to do justice to that smart and sophisticated start". He praised Lyn's directing and the character developments, especially of Watson, but Lestrade did not appear and the plot "fails to fully engage, the story feeling like 60-minutes of material dragged out over 90".

=== Critic rankings within overall series ===
Over the first few years (2017–2022) after the series first aired, assessments ranking the 13 episodes of the series against each other placed this episode 11th or 12th on their lists.

Retrospective criticism also focused on gender politics, racial stereotypes and a patronizing Orientalism in the episode. Laurie Penny, writing for The New Statesman, stated she was "tired of stories about clever white men", and characterised the plot as "booga-wooga yellow peril exotic chinky slaughter emporium". Kayti Burt, writing for Collider, rated the episode an eighth-best middle of the pack for the series, but noted its "seriously lazy Orientalism." Jaine Chemmachery, a lecturer in Postcolonial Literatures at Sorbonne University, wrote in a 2020 paper that: "The tropes of unassimilable otherness and unfathomable mystery are repackaged into a London Chinatown which is explicitly Orientalist," referring to both the series as a whole and this episode directly.
