= Lisa McAllister =

Scottish model and actress (born 1980)

- Born: 21 November 1980 (age 45)
- Occupations: model and actress

Lisa McAllister (born 21 November 1980) is a Scottish former model and former actress.

After starting her career as a model, her first acting role was in a 2000 Paul Angunawela short film called Carpet Garden Flowers. Her movie career started in earnest with the lead female role in a US direct-to-video action film, The Number One Girl, with Vinnie Jones and Pat Morita, in 2005.

McAllister also had a brief music career, as part of the duo Fenix, along with Kirsty Spence. The duo attempted to represent the United Kingdom in the Eurovision Song Contest 2003 with the song, "Do Anything for Your Love". The song reached the semifinal of A Song For Europe, but failed to reach the final.

After being active on television, including a regular role in Dream Team, she has appeared in several British paranormal and horror films. She returned to television in 2010 for a cameo as Anthea, Mycroft Holmes' assistant in Sherlock which was described by Caitlin Moran in The Times as "one of the deftest comedy cameos of the year". In 2010 she also appeared in a pictorial of the British FHM. Her last appearance was as a performer in two 2015 episodes of the British version of Drunk History.

== Acting career ==
- Carpet Garden Flowers (2000) as Kate McAllister (Short)
- The Number One Girl (2005) - Tatiana (direct to video)
- The Dark Knight (2008) - Passenger
- How I Learned To Love Richard Gere (short film) (2008) - Vanessa
- How to Lose Friends & Alienate People (2008) - Sophie Maes' Assistant
- The Rapture (2010) - Angel
- Just for the Record (2010) - Rosie Frond
- Devil's Playground (2010) - Kate
- Dead Cert (2010) - Jen Christian
- Killing Bono (2011) - Erika
- Rush (2013) - BOAC Stewardess
- Scar Tissue (2013) - Ruth Elliott
- Robocroc (2013) - Jane

=== Television ===
- Dream Team (2004–05) - Sofia Moxham
- Sea of Souls (2006) - Isobel
- Pumpkinhead: Ashes to Ashes (2006) - Dahlia Wallace
- The Bill (2007) - Isabelle Klein
- Sherlock - Anthea - episodes: "A Study in Pink" (2010), "The Empty Hearse" (2014)
- Hardy Bucks (2011) - Svetlana Salmon
- The Fear (2012) - Donna
- Drunk History - 2 episodes (2015)
