= The Reichenbach Fall =

- Sherlock episode
- Titlescreen of the episode showing Turner's 1804 painting of the Reichenbach Falls
- Episode no.: Series 2 Episode 3
- Directed by: Toby Haynes
- Written by: Stephen Thompson
- Based on: "The Final Problem" by Arthur Conan Doyle
- Cinematography by: Fabian Wagner
- Editing by: Tim Porter
- Original air date: 15 January 2012
- Running time: 88 minutes

Guest appearances
- Vinette Robinson as Sgt Sally Donovan; Jonathan Aris as Philip Anderson; Katherine Parkinson as Kitty Riley; Douglas Wilmer as Diogenes Club member; Edward Holtom as Rufus Bruhl

Episode chronology
← Previous "The Hounds of Baskerville"	Next → "The Empty Hearse"

"The Reichenbach Fall" is the third and final episode of the second series of the BBC television series Sherlock. It was written by Stephen Thompson and stars Benedict Cumberbatch as Sherlock Holmes, Martin Freeman as Dr John Watson, and Andrew Scott as Jim Moriarty. The episode deals with Moriarty's attempt to undermine the public's view of Sherlock and drive him to suicide. The episode was first broadcast on BBC One and BBC One HD on 15 January 2012. It attracted 9.78 million viewers, and critical reaction to the episode was positive. After the episode was aired, there was also much online and media speculation, which focused on Sherlock's death.

Inspired by "The Final Problem" by Sir Arthur Conan Doyle, the episode follows Moriarty's plot to discredit and kill Sherlock Holmes, also heavily using elements from the film The Woman in Green, from the British WWII-era Sherlock Holmes film series. The title alludes to the Reichenbach Falls, the location where Holmes and Moriarty supposedly fall to their deaths in the original story. Some sequences in the episode that are set at the Tower of London were filmed at Cardiff Castle. Other locations used include Newport Cemetery, Tredegar House and Cardiff City Hall, as well as other areas around Cardiff including Broadway and Cardiff Bay.

== Plot ==
John Watson is in his first meeting with his therapist after eighteen months. Struggling to explain the reason for his visit, he eventually chokes out the words, "My best friend, Sherlock Holmes, is dead". The episode flashes back to three months earlier, with Sherlock receiving plaudits and gifts from various people for whom he has solved cases, along with much-unwanted media attention, especially for his recovery of a Turner painting of Reichenbach Falls.

Meanwhile, Moriarty uses his mobile phone to simultaneously break into the case where the Crown Jewels are kept, open the vault at the Bank of England and unlock all the cells at Pentonville Prison. Before smashing the Crown Jewels' case, he writes the words "Get Sherlock" on the outside, to be seen by the security cameras. He then allows himself to be caught by the police wearing the jewels and sitting on the throne.

Sherlock is called to testify at Moriarty's trial, where he explains that Moriarty is a criminal mastermind. Moriarty has threatened the jurors with the deaths of their families, leading them to vote "not guilty". After being acquitted, Moriarty visits Sherlock and explains that his break-in was a publicity stunt to show potential clients what he is capable of, adding, "I owe you a fall." Meanwhile, John is summoned to see Mycroft, who explains that four professional assassins have moved into flats on Baker Street and asks him to watch out for Sherlock.

Sherlock and John investigate the kidnapping of the children of the British Ambassador to the U.S., Rufus Bruhl. Sherlock deciphers evidence allowing the police to find the children, but as part of a plot to make others suspect that Sherlock has been staging his cases himself, Moriarty has traumatised the girl, so she is terrified of Sherlock when she sees him. Sergeant Donovan begins to suspect Sherlock. The chief superintendent forces a reluctant Lestrade to arrest Sherlock, but he escapes with John handcuffed as his 'hostage'. They realise Moriarty's "Get Sherlock" has convinced the criminal underworld that Moriarty has given Sherlock the computer code he used to pull off his triple heist. This code is supposedly capable of bypassing all security systems.

Sherlock and John break into the house of journalist Kitty Riley, who is poised to publish an exposé on Sherlock. They find that Moriarty has created a fake identity, Richard Brook ("Reichen Bach" in German), an actor whom Sherlock supposedly paid to pose as a master criminal. Now a wanted man with his media image on the verge of plummeting, Sherlock launches a final gambit. Leaving John, Sherlock contacts Molly Hooper, a pathologist at St. Bartholomew's Hospital, and admits that, contrary to her belief, he respects her and has always trusted her. He tells Molly he is in grave danger and humbly asks her for help. John goes to the Diogenes Club to question Mycroft and learns that Mycroft unintentionally divulged Sherlock's personal information during his interrogations of Moriarty. Meanwhile, Sherlock deduces that the anti-security code was encoded in the tapping of Moriarty's fingers during his earlier visit.

John finds Sherlock at the St. Bartholomew's lab but leaves after hearing Mrs. Hudson has been shot. Sherlock texts Moriarty, inviting him to meet him on the hospital roof to solve their "final problem". Sherlock claims that he can electronically erase Richard Brook with the code. But Moriarty reveals that there is no code; he simply bribed security guards. He gives Sherlock an ultimatum: Sherlock must commit suicide or Moriarty's hitmen will kill John, Mrs. Hudson, and Lestrade. Sherlock realizes Moriarty has a way to prevent the executions and convinces Moriarty that he is willing to do anything to make him stop the assassins. After acknowledging their similarities, Moriarty tells Sherlock, "As long as I am alive, you can save your friends". He then commits suicide by shooting himself, effectively closing Sherlock's options for saving his friends other than jumping from the roof.

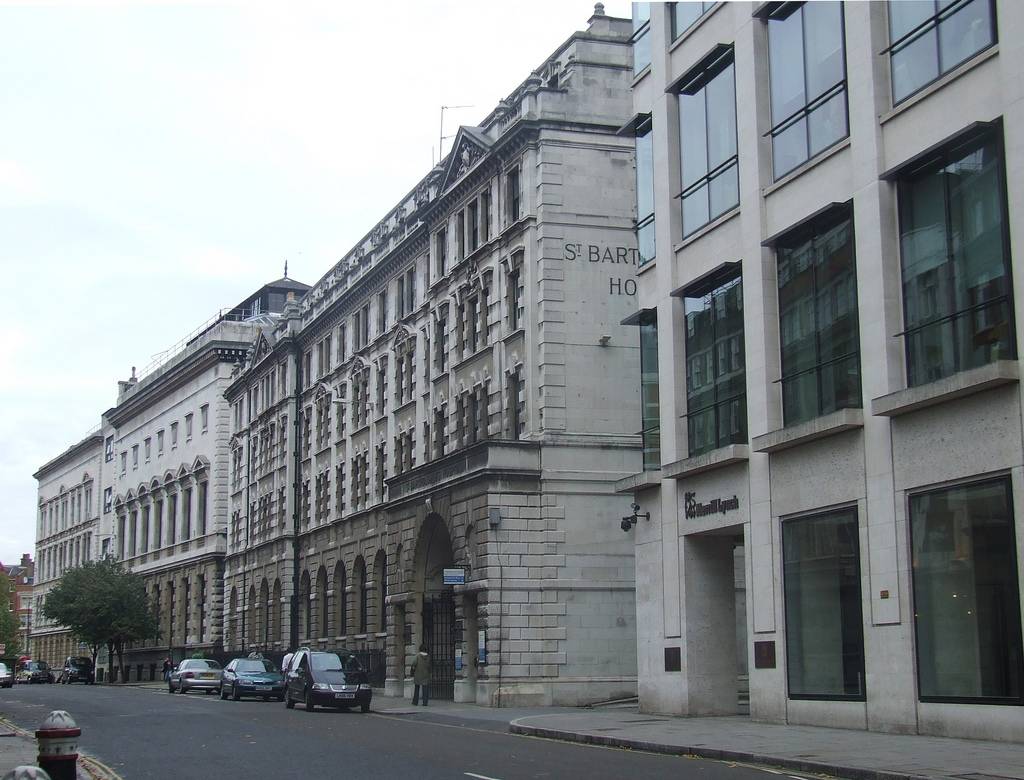
St Bartholomew's Hospital

Afterward, Sherlock calls John, who is rushing back from 221B Baker Street after finding Mrs. Hudson was safe. Claiming that he was always a fake and explaining this last phone call is his "note", Sherlock swan-dives off the roof of St. Bartholomew, as John looks on terrified from the street, thereby ensuring that Moriarty's true identity dies with him. After being knocked to the ground by a cyclist, John stumbles over to watch, grief-stricken, as Sherlock's bloody corpse is carried away by hospital staff.

The episode returns to John's therapy session, where he cannot open up. Mycroft is shown reading the tabloid newspaper The Sun with a front-page headline "Suicide of Fake Genius". Later, John visits Sherlock's grave with Mrs. Hudson. He reaffirms his faith in Sherlock and begs him not to be dead. As he walks away, Sherlock looks on from afar, out of John's sight, before also walking away.

== Sources ==
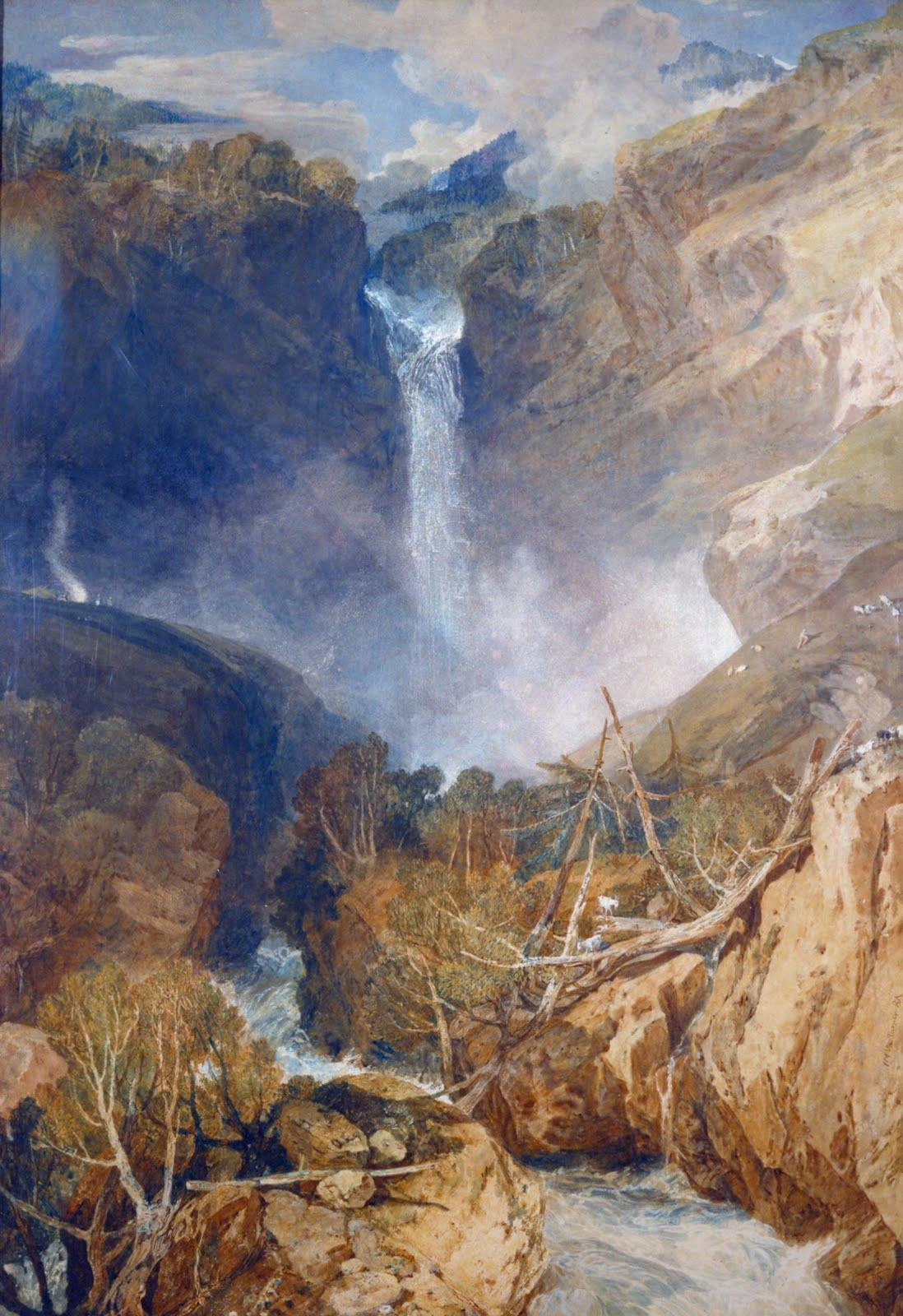
The Great Fall of the Reichenbach, in the Valley of Hasle, Switzerland (1804, watercolour on paper) by J.M.W. Turner

The episode's climactic scene is based on the short story "The Final Problem", in which Holmes and Moriarty square off. Watson's leaving Holmes to attend to Mrs Hudson mirrors his return to the inn in the original story, in order to attend to a dying Englishwoman.

The filming of the visit of Moriarty to Baker Street pays tribute to William Gillette's 1899 play Sherlock Holmes and the 1945 film The Woman in Green. Moriarty's attempt to destroy Holmes's reputation and lead him to committing suicide by jumping from a building also has similarities to The Woman in Green.

== Broadcast and reception ==
BARB overnight figures suggested that the episode was watched by 7.9 million viewers representing a 30% overall audience share, slightly down on the first (8.8 million) and second (8.2 million) episodes of the series. Final consolidated ratings rose to 9.78 million. The episode also became the second most-watched programme of 2012 on the online BBC iPlayer as of May, with over 1.9 million requests.

As with the preceding two episodes in the second series, critical reaction to the episode was largely positive. The Guardian's Sam Wollaston praised Steve Thompson's writing, particularly how the episode was, at times "faithful to Sir ACD's The Final Problem, then it will wander, taking in mobile phone technology and computer hacking ... But it doesn't feel like cheating; more like an open relationship, agreed by both parties." Wollaston comments that this episode explores relationships, particularly in contrast to the spookiness of the previous episode ("The Hounds of Baskerville"), calling Cumberbatch's and Freeman's performances "moving at times".

Sarah Crompton, for The Daily Telegraph, said Cumberbatch was "riding the wave of what has been a triumph". Generally praising the series, Crompton suggests that "writer Stephen Thompson had been left a little too much to his own devices ... The result was a bit wordy – though some of the words were wonderful." Commenting upon the cliffhanger ending, The Independent's Tom Sutcliffe says "Moffat and his colleagues have written themselves into a hell of a hole with regards to the next series. If they don't explain, there may be riots." Chris Tilly, who reviewed the episode for IGN, gave it a score of 10/10, calling it "The grandstanding conclusion to the brilliant BBC series, packed to the rafters with smart dialogue, audacious plotting, stylish direction and some truly wonderful performances."

The British Board of Film Classification has awarded the episode a 12 certificate for "moderate violence and gore". The episode was released with the remainder of the second series in the UK on DVD and Blu-ray on 23 January 2012.

=== Speculation and response to the cliffhanger ===
The episode's cliffhanger led to speculation on forums, social networking sites and in newspaper articles about its resolution. Theories included the use of a mask, a squash ball, a lorry or Moriarty's body, the dummy seen in Sherlock's flat at the beginning of the episode, the psychotropic drugs featured in "The Hounds of Baskerville", the participation of Sherlock's homeless network, and a cadaver supplied by Molly. In an interview with The Guardian, Moffat claims "there is a clue everybody's missed ... So many people theorising about Sherlock's death online – and they missed it!" Moffat noted that one of the central clues was "something that Sherlock did that was very out-of-character, but which nobody has picked up on." During the first episode of the third series this is played upon by the writers. The character, Anderson, who argued that Sherlock was a fraud is seen talking to Lestrade about a wild "Sherlock is Alive" theory having to do with a mask, even two years later.

Shortly after the episode aired, memes inspired by the episode emerged online, considering how ordinary people in the Sherlock universe would react to learning that their hero was a fake. The memes included recurring phrases such as "I fight John Watson's war", "Moriarty was real" and, most prominently, "I believe in Sherlock Holmes", amongst others, the latter of which was used in-universe in "The Empty Hearse". There was some speculation that the "#BelieveInSherlock" movement was orchestrated by the BBC as a publicity stunt.

Part of the resolution was filmed with the rest of the episode, although some, including hypothetical sequences involving Derren Brown and airbags, was filmed with "The Empty Hearse".
