= List of awards and nominations received by Sherlock =

Accolades for British television series

Sherlock awards and nominations
Awards and nominations
Award	Wins	Nominations
American Cinema Editors Eddie Awards	1	1
Art Directors Guild Excellence in Production Design Awards	0	2
Banff Rockie Awards	1	1
British Academy Cymru Awards	11	23
British Academy Scotland Awards	1	1
British Academy Television Awards	4	10
British Academy Television Craft Awards	6	13
British Screenwriters' Awards	0	2
Broadcast Awards	1	5
Broadcasting Press Guild Awards	2	6
Cinema Audio Society Awards	1	4
Costume Designers Guild Awards	0	1
Crime Thriller Awards	6	12
Critics' Choice Television Awards	2	9
Edgar Allan Poe Awards	1	3
Edinburgh International Television Festival Awards	3	3
Empire Awards	1	1
Golden Globe Awards	0	1
Golden Nymph Awards	0	2
Golden Reel Awards	0	2
International Film Music Critics Association Awards	0	1
Irish Film & Television Academy Awards	1	2
Make-Up Artists & Hair Stylists Guild Awards	1	2
National Television Awards	1	7
Peabody Awards	1	1
Primetime Creative Arts Emmy Awards	5	24
Primetime Emmy Awards	4	15
Prix Europa Awards	1	1
Producers Guild of America Awards	0	4
Robert Awards	0	1
Royal Television Society Craft & Design Awards	4	9
Russian National Movie Awards	2	4
Satellite Awards	2	6
Saturn Awards	0	1
Screen Actors Guild Awards	0	2
Seoul International Drama Awards	2	6
Shanghai Television Festival Magnolia Awards	0	1
South Bank Sky Arts Awards	1	2
Television and Radio Industries Club Awards	0	3
Television Critics Association Awards	1	2
TV Choice Awards	5	7
Writers' Guild of Great Britain Awards	0	2

Totals (Note: Certain award groups do not simply award one winner. They acknowledge several different recipients, have runners-up, and have third place. Since this is a specific recognition and is different from losing an award, runner-up mentions are considered wins in this award tally. For simplification and to avoid errors, each award in this list has been presumed to have had a prior nomination.)
- Wins: 72
- Nominations: 205

Sherlock is a British mystery and crime television series based on Sir Arthur Conan Doyle's Sherlock Holmes detective novels and stories. It was created by Steven Moffat and Mark Gatiss, and stars Benedict Cumberbatch as Sherlock Holmes and Martin Freeman as Doctor John Watson. Sherlock consists of thirteen episodes that were produced as four three-part series airing from 2010 to 2017 and a special episode, "The Abominable Bride", that aired on 1 January 2016.

Set in modern-day London, Sherlock depicts Holmes assisting the Metropolitan Police Service in solving various mysteries. He is assisted by Watson, who has returned from military service in Afghanistan with the Royal Army Medical Corps. The series also features Holmes's archenemy, Jim Moriarty (Andrew Scott), as well as his brother, Mycroft Holmes (Gatiss). Amanda Abbington appears as Watson's wife, Mary Morstan, while Una Stubbs plays Mrs Hudson, Holmes's landlady. The series also showcases Detective Inspector Greg Lestrade (Rupert Graves), a Scotland Yard detective and one of Holmes's best friends, and Irene Adler (Lara Pulver), a dominatrix who exchanges state secrets with Moriarty.

Sherlock was met with critical acclaim and received numerous accolades. It won the Peabody Award in 2011 for "A Study in Pink". The series garnered forty-seven nominations from the British Academy of Film and Television Arts, including four BAFTA TV wins: Best Drama Series, Best Supporting Actor (Freeman and Scott), and the Audience Award. Sherlock received thirty-nine Primetime Emmy nominations (with nine wins), including a win for Outstanding Television Movie (for "The Abominable Bride"). Cumberbatch and Freeman both won Emmys for their performances, as did Moffat for his screenwriting. The series garnered several other nominations, including twelve Crime Thriller Awards (six wins), nine Critics' Choice Television Awards (two wins), and three Edgar Allan Poe Awards (one win). Cumberbatch also received a nomination for the Golden Globe Award for Best Actor – Miniseries or Motion Picture Made for Television.

== Awards and nominations ==
Awards and nominations received by Sherlock
Award	Date of ceremony	Category	Recipient(s)	Result	Ref(s).
American Cinema Editors Eddie Awards	30 January 2015	Best Edited One-Hour Series for Commercial Television	Yan Miles (for "His Last Vow")	Won	
Art Directors Guild Excellence in Production Design Awards	31 January 2015	Excellence in Production Design for a Television Movie or Limited Series	Arwel Jones (for "His Last Vow")	Nominated	
Art Directors Guild Excellence in Production Design Awards	11 February 2017	Excellence in Production Design for a Television Movie or Limited Series	Arwel Jones (for "The Abominable Bride")	Nominated	
Banff Rockie Awards	12 June 2011	Best Continuing Series	Steven Moffat and Mark Gatiss (for "A Study in Pink")	Won	
British Academy Cymru Awards	29 May 2011	Best Television Drama	Sue Vertue (for "A Study in Pink")	Won	
British Academy Cymru Awards	29 May 2011	Best Director: Fiction	Euros Lyn (for "The Blind Banker")	Won	
British Academy Cymru Awards	29 May 2011	Best Director of Photography: Fiction	Steve Lawes (for "A Study in Pink")	Won	
British Academy Cymru Awards	29 May 2011	Best Production Design	Arwel Jones (for "A Study in Pink")	Won	
British Academy Cymru Awards	29 May 2011	Best Sound	Bang Post Production Team (for "The Great Game")	Nominated	
British Academy Cymru Awards	29 May 2011	Best Make-Up & Hair	Claire Pritchard-Jones (for "The Great Game")	Won	
British Academy Cymru Awards	29 September 2013	Best Television Drama	Sue Vertue	Nominated	
British Academy Cymru Awards	29 September 2013	Best Production Design	Arwel Jones	Won	
British Academy Cymru Awards	29 September 2013	Best Sound	Bang Post Production Team	Nominated	
British Academy Cymru Awards	29 September 2013	Best Make-Up & Hair	Meinir Jones-Lewis	Won	
British Academy Cymru Awards	26 October 2014	Best Television Drama	Sue Vertue	Won	
British Academy Cymru Awards	26 October 2014	Best Production Design	Arwel Jones	Won	
British Academy Cymru Awards	26 October 2014	Best Photography and Lighting	Steve Lawes	Nominated	
British Academy Cymru Awards	26 October 2014	Best Make-Up & Hair	Claire Pritchard-Jones	Won	
British Academy Cymru Awards	26 October 2014	Best Special, Visual & Graphic Effects	Real SFX	Nominated	
British Academy Cymru Awards	2 October 2016	Best Production Design	Arwel Jones	Nominated	
British Academy Cymru Awards	2 October 2016	Best Sound	Production Team	Nominated	
British Academy Cymru Awards	2 October 2016	Best Special, Visual & Graphic Effects	Production Team	Nominated	
British Academy Cymru Awards	8 October 2017	Best Editing	Will Oswald	Won	
British Academy Cymru Awards	8 October 2017	Best Production Design	Arwel Jones	Nominated	
British Academy Cymru Awards	8 October 2017	Best Make-Up & Hair	Claire Pritchard-Jones (for "The Abominable Bride")	Nominated	
British Academy Cymru Awards	8 October 2017	Best Make-Up & Hair	Claire Pritchard-Jones (for "The Lying Detective")	Nominated	
British Academy Cymru Awards	8 October 2017	Best Special, Visual & Graphic Effects	Production Team	Nominated	
British Academy Scotland Awards	6 November 2016	Best Director Film/Television	Douglas Mackinnon (for "The Abominable Bride")	Won	
British Academy Television Awards	22 May 2011	Best Drama Series	Steven Moffat, Mark Gatiss, Sue Vertue, and Beryl Vertue	Won	
British Academy Television Awards	22 May 2011	Best Actor	Benedict Cumberbatch	Nominated	
British Academy Television Awards	22 May 2011	Best Supporting Actor	Martin Freeman	Won	
British Academy Television Awards	22 May 2011	Audience Award	Sherlock	Nominated	
British Academy Television Awards	27 May 2012	Best Actor	Benedict Cumberbatch	Nominated	
British Academy Television Awards	27 May 2012	Best Supporting Actor	Andrew Scott	Won	
British Academy Television Awards	27 May 2012	Best Supporting Actor	Martin Freeman	Nominated	
British Academy Television Awards	27 May 2012	Audience Award	Sherlock	Nominated	
British Academy Television Awards	10 May 2015	Best Actor	Benedict Cumberbatch	Nominated	
British Academy Television Awards	10 May 2015	Audience Award	Sherlock	Won	
British Academy Television Craft Awards	8 May 2011	Best Director: Fiction	Paul McGuigan (for "A Study in Pink")	Nominated	
British Academy Television Craft Awards	8 May 2011	Best Editing: Fiction	Charlie Phillips (for "A Study in Pink")	Won	
British Academy Television Craft Awards	8 May 2011	Best Original Music	David Arnold and Michael Price (for "A Study in Pink")	Nominated	
British Academy Television Craft Awards	8 May 2011	Best Production Design	Arwel Jones (for "A Study in Pink")	Nominated	
British Academy Television Craft Awards	13 May 2012	Best Writer	Steven Moffat (for "A Scandal in Belgravia")	Won	
British Academy Television Craft Awards	13 May 2012	Best Editing: Fiction	Charlie Phillips (for "A Scandal in Belgravia")	Won	
British Academy Television Craft Awards	13 May 2012	Best Sound: Fiction	Howard Bargroff, Jeremy Child, John Mooney, and Doug Sinclair (for "A Scandal in Belgravia")	Won	
British Academy Television Craft Awards	26 April 2015	Best Editing: Fiction	Yan Miles	Won	
British Academy Television Craft Awards	26 April 2015	Best Sound: Fiction	Howard Bargroff, Jeremy Child, Paul McFadden, and Doug Sinclair	Won	
British Academy Television Craft Awards	23 April 2017	Best Special, Visual & Graphic Effects	Kevin Horsewood, Real SFX, and Milk VFX (for "The Abominable Bride")	Nominated	
British Academy Television Craft Awards	23 April 2017	Best Editing: Fiction	Andrew McClelland (for "The Abominable Bride")	Nominated	
British Academy Television Craft Awards	23 April 2017	Best Sound: Fiction	Howard Bargroff, John Mooney, and Doug Sinclair, and Jon Salmon-Joyce (for "The Abominable Bride")	Nominated	
British Academy Television Craft Awards	22 April 2018	Best Sound: Fiction	Sound Team	Nominated	
British Screenwriters' Awards	27 October 2014	Best British TV Drama Writing	Steven Moffat and Mark Gatiss	Nominated	
British Screenwriters' Awards	26 October 2015	Best British TV Drama Writing	Steven Moffat and Mark Gatiss	Nominated	
Broadcast Awards	2 February 2011	Best Drama Series or Serial	Sherlock	Won	
Broadcast Awards	2 February 2011	Best New Programme	Sherlock	Nominated	
Broadcast Awards	30 January 2013	International Programme Sales	Sherlock	Nominated	
Broadcast Awards	4 February 2015	Best Drama Series or Serial	Sherlock	Nominated	
Broadcast Awards	1 February 2017	Best Single Drama	Sherlock (for "The Abominable Bride")	Nominated	
Broadcasting Press Guild Awards	25 March 2011	Best Drama Series	Sherlock	Nominated	
Broadcasting Press Guild Awards	25 March 2011	Best Actor	Benedict Cumberbatch	Won (Note: Also for Van Gogh: Painted with Words)	
Broadcasting Press Guild Awards	25 March 2011	Writer's Award	Steven Moffat, Mark Gatiss, and Stephen Thompson	Nominated (Note: Moffat was also nominated for Doctor Who.)	
Broadcasting Press Guild Awards	14 March 2013	Best Drama Series	Sherlock	Nominated	
Broadcasting Press Guild Awards	14 March 2013	Best Actor	Benedict Cumberbatch	Won (Note: Also for Parade's End)	
Broadcasting Press Guild Awards	14 March 2013	Writer's Award	Steven Moffat	Nominated (Note: Also for Doctor Who)	
Cinema Audio Society Awards	16 February 2013	Outstanding Achievement in Sound Mixing for Television Movie or Limited Series	John Mooney, Howard Bargroff, Nick Wollage, Paul McFadden, and Will Everett (for "A Scandal in Belgravia")	Nominated	
Cinema Audio Society Awards	14 February 2015	Outstanding Achievement in Sound Mixing for Television Movie or Limited Series	John Mooney, Howard Bargroff, Nick Wollage, Peter Gleaves, and Will Everett (for "His Last Vow")	Won	
Cinema Audio Society Awards	18 February 2017	Outstanding Achievement in Sound Mixing for Television Movie or Limited Series	John Mooney, Howard Bargroff, Nick Wollage, Peter Gleaves, and Jamie Talbutt (for "The Abominable Bride")	Nominated	
Cinema Audio Society Awards	24 February 2018	Outstanding Achievement in Sound Mixing for Television Movie or Limited Series	John Mooney, Howard Bargroff, Nick Wollage, Peter Gleaves, and Jamie Talbutt (for "The Lying Detective")	Nominated	
Costume Designers Guild Awards	17 February 2015	Outstanding Made for Television Movie or Miniseries	Sarah Arthur	Nominated	
Crime Thriller Awards	8 October 2010	Best Television Series	Sherlock	Won	
Crime Thriller Awards	8 October 2010	Best Actor	Benedict Cumberbatch	Won	
Crime Thriller Awards	8 October 2010	Best Supporting Actor	Rupert Graves	Nominated	
Crime Thriller Awards	18 October 2012	Best Television Series	Sherlock	Won	
Crime Thriller Awards	18 October 2012	Best Actor	Benedict Cumberbatch	Won	
Crime Thriller Awards	18 October 2012	Best Supporting Actor	Martin Freeman	Won	
Crime Thriller Awards	18 October 2012	Best Supporting Actress	Una Stubbs	Nominated	
Crime Thriller Awards	24 October 2014	Best Television Series	Sherlock	Nominated	
Crime Thriller Awards	24 October 2014	Best Actor	Benedict Cumberbatch	Nominated	
Crime Thriller Awards	24 October 2014	Best Actor	Martin Freeman	Nominated (Note: Also for Fargo)	
Crime Thriller Awards	24 October 2014	Best Supporting Actor	Mark Gatiss	Nominated	
Crime Thriller Awards	24 October 2014	Best Supporting Actress	Amanda Abbington	Won	
Critics' Choice Television Awards	18 June 2012	Best Movie/Miniseries	Sherlock	Won	
Critics' Choice Television Awards	18 June 2012	Best Actor in a Movie/Miniseries	Benedict Cumberbatch	Won	
Critics' Choice Television Awards	18 June 2012	Best Actress in a Movie/Miniseries	Lara Pulver	Nominated	
Critics' Choice Television Awards	19 June 2014	Best Movie/Miniseries	Sherlock (for "His Last Vow")	Nominated	
Critics' Choice Television Awards	19 June 2014	Best Actor in a Movie/Miniseries	Benedict Cumberbatch (for "His Last Vow")	Nominated	
Critics' Choice Television Awards	19 June 2014	Best Supporting Actor in a Movie/Miniseries	Martin Freeman (for "His Last Vow")	Nominated	
Critics' Choice Television Awards	19 June 2014	Best Supporting Actress in a Movie/Miniseries	Amanda Abbington (for "His Last Vow")	Nominated	
Critics' Choice Television Awards	11 December 2016	Best Actor in a Movie/Miniseries	Benedict Cumberbatch (for "The Abominable Bride")	Nominated	
Critics' Choice Television Awards	11 January 2018	Best Movie/Miniseries	Sherlock (for "The Lying Detective")	Nominated	
Edgar Allan Poe Awards	2 May 2013	Best Episode in a TV Series	Steven Moffat (for "A Scandal in Belgravia")	Won	
Edgar Allan Poe Awards	29 April 2015	Best Episode in a TV Series	Mark Gatiss (for "The Empty Hearse")	Nominated	
Edgar Allan Poe Awards	27 April 2017	Best Episode in a TV Series	Steven Moffat and Mark Gatiss (for "The Abominable Bride")	Nominated	
Edinburgh International Television Festival Awards	27 August 2011	Best Terrestrial Show	Sherlock	Won	
Edinburgh International Television Festival Awards	24 August 2012	Best Terrestrial Show	Sherlock	Won	
Edinburgh International Television Festival Awards	24 August 2012	Network And Ones to Watch Programme Choice	Sherlock	Won	
Empire Awards	19 March 2017	Best TV Series	Sherlock	Won	
Golden Globe Awards	13 January 2013	Best Actor – Miniseries or Motion Picture Made for Television	Benedict Cumberbatch	Nominated	
Golden Nymph Awards	11 June 2014	Best Television Film	Sherlock	Nominated	
Golden Nymph Awards	11 June 2014	Best Actor in a Television Film	Benedict Cumberbatch	Nominated	
Golden Reel Awards	19 February 2017	Outstanding Achievement in Sound Editing – Series 1 Hour – Dialogue / ADR	Doug Sinclair and Paul McFadden (for "The Abominable Bride")	Nominated	
Golden Reel Awards	19 February 2017	Outstanding Achievement in Sound Editing – Series 1 Hour – Effects / Foley	Doug Sinclair, Jamie Talbutt, Julie Ankerson, Stuart McCowan, and Jon Salmon-Joyce (for "The Abominable Bride")	Nominated	
International Film Music Critics Association Awards	23 February 2012	Best Original Score for Television	David Arnold and Michael Price	Nominated	
Irish Film & Television Academy Awards	9 February 2013	Best Supporting Actor	Andrew Scott	Won	
Irish Film & Television Academy Awards	24 May 2015	Best Supporting Actor	Andrew Scott (for "His Last Vow")	Nominated	
Make-Up Artists & Hair Stylists Guild Awards	14 February 2015	Best Contemporary Make-Up in a Television Miniseries or Motion Picture Made for Television	Claire Pritchard-Jones and Sarah Astley-Hughes	Nominated	
Make-Up Artists & Hair Stylists Guild Awards	14 February 2015	Best Contemporary Hair Styling in a Television Miniseries or Motion Picture Made for Television	Claire Pritchard-Jones and Sarah Astley-Hughes	Won	
National Television Awards	26 January 2011	Best Drama	Sherlock	Nominated	
National Television Awards	26 January 2011	Best Drama Performance	Benedict Cumberbatch	Nominated	
National Television Awards	23 January 2013	Best Drama	Sherlock	Nominated	
National Television Awards	23 January 2013	Best Drama Performance	Benedict Cumberbatch	Nominated	
National Television Awards	22 January 2014	Best TV Detective	Benedict Cumberbatch	Won	
National Television Awards	21 January 2015	Best Drama	Sherlock	Nominated	
National Television Awards	21 January 2015	Best Drama Performance	Benedict Cumberbatch	Nominated	
Peabody Awards	31 March 2011	Excellence in Electronic Media	Sherlock (for "A Study in Pink")	Won	
Primetime Creative Arts Emmy Awards	10 September 2011	Outstanding Music Composition for a Miniseries, Movie, or Special	David Arnold and Michael Price (for "A Study in Pink")	Nominated	
Primetime Creative Arts Emmy Awards	10 September 2011	Outstanding Single-Camera Picture Editing for a Miniseries or Movie	Charlie Phillips (for "A Study in Pink")	Nominated	
Primetime Creative Arts Emmy Awards	10 September 2011	Outstanding Special Visual Effects for a Miniseries, Movie, or Special	James Etherington, Danny Hargreaves, Will Cohen, Ron Bowman, James Moxon, and Arianna Lago (for "A Study in Pink")	Nominated	
Primetime Creative Arts Emmy Awards	15 September 2012	Outstanding Art Direction for a Miniseries or Movie	Arwel Jones, Dafydd Shurmer, and Joelle Rumbelow (for "A Scandal in Belgravia")	Nominated	
Primetime Creative Arts Emmy Awards	15 September 2012	Outstanding Casting for a Miniseries, Movie, or Special	Kate Rhodes James (for "A Scandal in Belgravia")	Nominated	
Primetime Creative Arts Emmy Awards	15 September 2012	Outstanding Cinematography for a Miniseries or Movie	Fabian Wagner (for "A Scandal in Belgravia")	Nominated	
Primetime Creative Arts Emmy Awards	15 September 2012	Outstanding Costumes for a Miniseries, Movie, or Special	Sarah Arthur and Ceri Walford (for "A Scandal in Belgravia")	Nominated	
Primetime Creative Arts Emmy Awards	15 September 2012	Outstanding Music Composition for a Miniseries, Movie, or Special	David Arnold and Michael Price (for "A Scandal in Belgravia")	Nominated	
Primetime Creative Arts Emmy Awards	15 September 2012	Outstanding Single-Camera Picture Editing for a Miniseries or Movie	Charlie Phillips (for "A Scandal in Belgravia")	Nominated	
Primetime Creative Arts Emmy Awards	15 September 2012	Outstanding Sound Editing for a Miniseries, Movie, or Special	Doug Sinclair and Jeremy Child (for "A Scandal in Belgravia")	Nominated	
Primetime Creative Arts Emmy Awards	15 September 2012	Outstanding Sound Mixing for a Miniseries or Movie	Howard Bargroff and John Mooney (for "A Scandal in Belgravia")	Nominated	
Primetime Creative Arts Emmy Awards	16 August 2014	Outstanding Casting for a Miniseries, Movie, or Special	Kate Rhodes James and Julia Duff (for "His Last Vow")	Nominated	
Primetime Creative Arts Emmy Awards	16 August 2014	Outstanding Cinematography for a Miniseries or Movie	Neville Kidd (for "His Last Vow")	Won	
Primetime Creative Arts Emmy Awards	16 August 2014	Outstanding Costumes for a Miniseries, Movie, or Special	Sarah Arthur and Ceri Walford (for "His Last Vow")	Nominated	
Primetime Creative Arts Emmy Awards	16 August 2014	Outstanding Music Composition for a Miniseries, Movie, or Special	David Arnold and Michael Price (for "His Last Vow")	Won	
Primetime Creative Arts Emmy Awards	16 August 2014	Outstanding Single-Camera Picture Editing for a Miniseries or Movie	Yan Miles (for "His Last Vow")	Won	
Primetime Creative Arts Emmy Awards	16 August 2014	Outstanding Sound Editing for a Miniseries, Movie, or Special	Doug Sinclair, Stuart McCowan, Jon Joyce, Paul McFadden, William Everett, and Sue Harding (for "His Last Vow")	Won	
Primetime Creative Arts Emmy Awards	16 August 2014	Outstanding Sound Mixing for a Miniseries or Movie	Howard Bargroff, John Mooney, Doug Sinclair, and Peter Gleaves (for "His Last Vow")	Nominated	
Primetime Creative Arts Emmy Awards	11 September 2016	Outstanding Cinematography for a Miniseries or Movie	Suzie Lavelle (for "The Abominable Bride")	Nominated	
Primetime Creative Arts Emmy Awards	11 September 2016	Outstanding Sound Editing for a Miniseries, Movie, or Special	Doug Sinclair, Stuart McCowan, Paul McFadden, Jonathan Joyce, Howard Bargroff, Rael Jones, Jamie Talbutt, and Julie Ankerson (for "The Abominable Bride")	Nominated	
Primetime Creative Arts Emmy Awards	11 September 2016	Outstanding Sound Mixing for a Miniseries or Movie	Howard Bargroff, John Mooney, Peter Gleaves, and Nick Wollage (for "The Abominable Bride")	Nominated	
Primetime Creative Arts Emmy Awards	11 September 2016	Outstanding Special Visual Effects in a Supporting Role	Danny Hargreaves, Henry Brook, Dewi Foulkes, JC Deguara, Natalie Reid, Sara Bennett, Matias Derkacz, Neil Alford, and Amy Felce (for "The Abominable Bride")	Won	
Primetime Creative Arts Emmy Awards	10 September 2017	Outstanding Sound Editing for a Miniseries, Movie, or Special	Doug Sinclair, Stuart McCowan, Paul McFadden, Jonathan Joyce, Howard Bargroff, Rael Jones, Jamie Talbutt, Sue Harding, and Nathan Palmer (for "The Lying Detective")	Nominated	
Primetime Creative Arts Emmy Awards	10 September 2017	Outstanding Sound Mixing for a Miniseries or Movie	Howard Bargroff, John Mooney, Peter Gleaves, and Nick Wollage (for "The Lying Detective")	Nominated	
Primetime Emmy Awards	18 September 2011	Outstanding Writing for a Miniseries, Movie, or Dramatic Special	Steven Moffat (for "A Study in Pink")	Nominated	
Primetime Emmy Awards	23 September 2012	Outstanding Miniseries or Movie	Sue Vertue, Beryl Vertue, Steven Moffat, Mark Gatiss, Rebecca Eaton, and Bethan Jones (for "A Scandal in Belgravia")	Nominated	
Primetime Emmy Awards	23 September 2012	Outstanding Lead Actor in a Miniseries or Movie	Benedict Cumberbatch (for "A Scandal in Belgravia")	Nominated	
Primetime Emmy Awards	23 September 2012	Outstanding Supporting Actor in a Miniseries or Movie	Martin Freeman (for "A Scandal in Belgravia")	Nominated	
Primetime Emmy Awards	23 September 2012	Outstanding Directing for a Miniseries, Movie, or Dramatic Special	Paul McGuigan (for "A Scandal in Belgravia")	Nominated	
Primetime Emmy Awards	23 September 2012	Outstanding Writing for a Miniseries, Movie, or Dramatic Special	Steven Moffat (for "A Scandal in Belgravia")	Nominated	
Primetime Emmy Awards	25 August 2014	Outstanding Television Movie	Sue Vertue, Beryl Vertue, Steven Moffat, Mark Gatiss, and Rebecca Eaton (for "His Last Vow")	Nominated	
Primetime Emmy Awards	25 August 2014	Outstanding Lead Actor in a Miniseries or Movie	Benedict Cumberbatch (for "His Last Vow")	Won	
Primetime Emmy Awards	25 August 2014	Outstanding Supporting Actor in a Miniseries or Movie	Martin Freeman (for "His Last Vow")	Won	
Primetime Emmy Awards	25 August 2014	Outstanding Directing for a Miniseries, Movie, or Dramatic Special	Nick Hurran (for "His Last Vow")	Nominated	
Primetime Emmy Awards	25 August 2014	Outstanding Writing for a Miniseries, Movie, or Dramatic Special	Steven Moffat (for "His Last Vow")	Won	
Primetime Emmy Awards	18 September 2016	Outstanding Television Movie	Sue Vertue, Beryl Vertue, Steven Moffat, Mark Gatiss, and Rebecca Eaton (for "The Abominable Bride")	Won	
Primetime Emmy Awards	18 September 2016	Outstanding Lead Actor in a Miniseries or Movie	Benedict Cumberbatch (for "The Abominable Bride")	Nominated	
Primetime Emmy Awards	17 September 2017	Outstanding Television Movie	Sue Vertue, Beryl Vertue, Steven Moffat, Mark Gatiss, Rebecca Eaton, and Bethan Jones (for "The Lying Detective")	Nominated	
Primetime Emmy Awards	17 September 2017	Outstanding Lead Actor in a Miniseries or Movie	Benedict Cumberbatch (for "The Lying Detective")	Nominated	
Prix Europa Awards	31 October 2011	Best Episode of a Television Fiction Series or Serial of the Year	Sherlock (for "A Study in Pink")	Won	
Producers Guild of America Awards	26 January 2013	Best Long-Form Television	Sue Vertue, Beryl Vertue, Mark Gatiss, and Steven Moffat	Nominated	
Producers Guild of America Awards	24 January 2015	Best Long-Form Television	Sue Vertue, Beryl Vertue, Mark Gatiss, and Steven Moffat	Nominated	
Producers Guild of America Awards	28 January 2017	Best Long-Form Television	Sue Vertue, Beryl Vertue, Mark Gatiss, and Steven Moffat (for "The Abominable Bride")	Nominated	
Producers Guild of America Awards	20 January 2018	Best Long-Form Television	Sue Vertue, Beryl Vertue, Mark Gatiss, Steven Moffat, and Rebecca Eaton (for "The Lying Detective")	Nominated	
Robert Awards	28 February 2013	Best Foreign Television Series	Sherlock	Nominated	
Royal Television Society Craft & Design Awards	24 November 2010	Photography – Drama	Steve Lawes	Nominated	
Royal Television Society Craft & Design Awards	24 November 2010	Effects – Picture Enhancement	Kevin Horsewood	Won	
Royal Television Society Craft & Design Awards	24 November 2010	Tape and Film Editing – Drama	Charlie Phillips	Won	
Royal Television Society Craft & Design Awards	24 November 2010	Music – Original Score	David Arnold and Michael Price	Nominated	
Royal Television Society Craft & Design Awards	24 November 2010	Music – Original Title	David Arnold and Michael Price	Won	
Royal Television Society Craft & Design Awards	1 December 2014	Photography – Drama	Neville Kidd	Nominated	
Royal Television Society Craft & Design Awards	1 December 2014	Graphic Design – Programme Content Sequences	Peter Anderson Studio	Nominated	
Royal Television Society Craft & Design Awards	27 November 2017	Effects – Special	Real SFX	Won	
Royal Television Society Craft & Design Awards	27 November 2017	Sound – Drama	Sound Team	Nominated	
Royal Television Society Programme Awards	15 March 2011	Best Drama Series	Sherlock	Won	
Royal Television Society Programme Awards	19 March 2013	Best Drama Series	Sherlock	Won	
Royal Television Society Programme Awards	19 March 2013	Best Writer – Drama	Steven Moffat	Won	
Russian National Movie Awards	7 April 2015	Foreign TV Drama of the Year	Sherlock	Won	
Russian National Movie Awards	7 April 2015	Foreign Actor of the Year	Benedict Cumberbatch	Nominated (Note: Also for The Hobbit: The Battle of the Five Armies)	
Russian National Movie Awards	7 April 2015	Foreign Actor of the Year	Martin Freeman	Nominated (Note: Also for The Hobbit: The Battle of the Five Armies and Fargo)	
Russian National Movie Awards	7 April 2015	Foreign Hero of the Year	Benedict Cumberbatch	Won	
Satellite Awards	19 December 2010	Best Miniseries	Sherlock	Won	
Satellite Awards	19 December 2010	Best Actor – Miniseries or Television Film	Benedict Cumberbatch	Nominated	
Satellite Awards	16 December 2012	Best Miniseries or Television Film	Sherlock	Nominated	
Satellite Awards	16 December 2012	Best Actor – Miniseries or Television Film	Benedict Cumberbatch	Won	
Satellite Awards	15 February 2015	Best Miniseries	Sherlock	Nominated	
Satellite Awards	11 February 2018	Best Actor – Miniseries or Television Film	Benedict Cumberbatch	Nominated	
Saturn Awards	23 June 2011	Best Television Presentation	Sherlock	Nominated	
Screen Actors Guild Awards	25 January 2015	Outstanding Performance by a Male Actor in a Miniseries or Television Movie	Benedict Cumberbatch (for "His Last Vow")	Nominated	
Screen Actors Guild Awards	21 January 2018	Outstanding Performance by a Male Actor in a Miniseries or Television Movie	Benedict Cumberbatch (for "The Lying Detective")	Nominated	
Seoul International Drama Awards	30 August 2012	Best Miniseries	Sherlock	Won	
Seoul International Drama Awards	4 September 2014	Most Popular Foreign Drama of the Year	Sherlock	Won	
Seoul International Drama Awards	4 September 2014	Best Actor	Benedict Cumberbatch	Nominated	
Seoul International Drama Awards	8 September 2016	Best TV Movie	Sherlock (for "The Abominable Bride")	Nominated	
Seoul International Drama Awards	8 September 2016	Best Actor	Benedict Cumberbatch (for "The Abominable Bride")	Nominated	
Seoul International Drama Awards	8 September 2016	Best Director	Douglas Mackinnon (for "The Abominable Bride")	Nominated	
Shanghai Television Festival Magnolia Awards	16 June 2017	Best Foreign Television Series	Sherlock	Nominated	
South Bank Sky Arts Awards	25 January 2011	Best TV Drama	Sherlock	Nominated	
South Bank Sky Arts Awards	1 May 2012	Best TV Drama	Sherlock	Won	
Television and Radio Industries Club Awards	8 March 2011	Drama Programme of the Year	Sherlock	Nominated	
Television and Radio Industries Club Awards	13 March 2013	Crime Programme of the Year	Sherlock	Nominated	
Television and Radio Industries Club Awards	10 March 2015	Crime Programme of the Year	Sherlock	Nominated	
Television Critics Association Awards	6 August 2011	Outstanding Achievement in Movies, Miniseries and Specials	Sherlock	Won	
Television Critics Association Awards	28 July 2012	Outstanding Achievement in Movies, Miniseries and Specials	Sherlock	Nominated	
TV Choice Awards	13 September 2011	Best New Drama	Sherlock	Won	
TV Choice Awards	13 September 2011	Best Actor	Benedict Cumberbatch	Nominated	
TV Choice Awards	10 September 2012	Best Drama Series	Sherlock	Won	
TV Choice Awards	10 September 2012	Best Actor	Benedict Cumberbatch	Won	
TV Choice Awards	8 September 2014	Best Drama Series	Sherlock	Won	
TV Choice Awards	8 September 2014	Best Actor	Benedict Cumberbatch	Won	
TV Choice Awards	4 September 2017	Best Actor	Benedict Cumberbatch	Nominated	
Writers' Guild of Great Britain Awards	16 November 2011	Best Television Short-Form Drama	Steven Moffat, Mark Gatiss, and Stephen Thompson	Nominated	
Writers' Guild of Great Britain Awards	14 November 2012	Best Television Short-Form Drama	Steven Moffat, Mark Gatiss, and Stephen Thompson	Nominated	
