= Sherlock: The Game Is Now =

Escape room based on the television programme

Sherlock: The Game Is Now is an escape room based on the television program Sherlock. Created by Sherlock creators Steven Moffat and Mark Gatiss, the game features audio and video scenes with "original Sherlock cast members" including video scenes with Martin Freeman as John, Andrew Scott as Jim Moriarty and Benedict Cumberbatch as Sherlock Holmes, the latter of which only appears in audio form.

The experience is built in the West 12 shopping centre in Shepherd's Bush and designed by the creators of London's Time Run. Software distribution company Buzzshot provided the administration system software for the game.

== Game play ==
Players are auditioning to join The Network, a team led by Mycroft Holmes. Beginning at Doyle's Opticians, a video briefing featuring Mycroft Holmes in 221B Baker Street starts "a series of classic escape-room puzzles themed around the world of Sherlock". Teams of four to six people progress through three rooms to solve the 60 minute game.

After a 10-minute debriefing where the team's skills are assessed, the game finishes at a Sherlock themed pub called "The Mind Palace".

== Reception ==
Gatiss himself claimed to be very pleased with the result, saying, "We tried it today – and were useless. It's great fun and Sherlock fans and non-fans alike will take great pleasure in it."
