= Sherlock (TV series) =

British mystery crime drama television series (2010–2017)

- Genre: Crime; Mystery; Comedy drama
- Created by: Mark Gatiss; Steven Moffat
- Based on: Sherlock Holmes by Sir Arthur Conan Doyle
- Written by: Mark Gatiss; Steven Moffat; Stephen Thompson
- Starring: Benedict Cumberbatch; Martin Freeman
- Composers: David Arnold; Michael Price
- Country of origin: United Kingdom
- Original language: English
- No. of series: 4
- No. of episodes: 13 (list of episodes)

Production
- Executive producers: Mark Gatiss; Steven Moffat; Beryl Vertue; Rebecca Eaton; Bethan Jones; Sue Vertue
- Producers: Sue Vertue; Elaine Cameron
- Cinematography: Fabian Wagner; Steve Lawes
- Editors: Charlie Phillips; Mali Evans; Tim Porter; Yan Miles
- Camera setup: Single-camera
- Running time: 85–90 minutes
- Production companies: Hartswood Films; BBC Wales; WGBH

Original release
- Network: BBC One
- Release: 25 July 2010 – 15 January 2017

Sherlock is a British mystery crime drama television series based on Sir Arthur Conan Doyle's Sherlock Holmes detective stories. Created by Steven Moffat and Mark Gatiss, the show stars Benedict Cumberbatch as Sherlock Holmes and Martin Freeman as Doctor John Watson. Thirteen episodes were produced, with four three-part series airing from 2010 to 2017 and a special episode that aired on 1 January 2016. The series is set in the present day. The one-off special features a Victorian-period fantasy resembling the original Holmes stories.

Sherlock was produced by the BBC, along with Hartswood Films; Moffat, Gatiss, Sue Vertue and Rebecca Eaton were the executive producers. The series was supported by the American station WGBH-TV Boston for its PBS anthology series, Masterpiece, where it also aired in the United States. The series was filmed primarily in Cardiff. North Gower Street in London was used for exterior shots of Holmes's and Watson's 221B Baker Street residence.

Sherlock's first three series received praise for the quality of the writing, acting, and directing, though the final series had a mixed reception. The programme has been nominated for numerous awards including Emmys, BAFTAs and a Golden Globe, winning several awards across a variety of categories prior to its final series.

The show won in three categories at the 66th Primetime Emmy Awards including Outstanding Lead Actor in a Miniseries or a Movie for Cumberbatch, Outstanding Supporting Actor in a Miniseries or a Movie for Freeman, and Outstanding Writing for a Miniseries, Movie or a Dramatic Special for Moffat. Two years later, it won Outstanding Television Movie. In addition, the show was also honoured with a Peabody Award in 2011. The third series became the UK's most watched drama series since 2001. Sherlock has been sold to 180 territories.

All of the series have been released on DVD and Blu-ray, alongside tie-in editions of selected original Conan Doyle books and an original soundtrack composed by David Arnold and Michael Price. In January 2014, the show launched its official mobile app called Sherlock: The Network.

== Premise ==
Sherlock depicts "consulting detective" Sherlock Holmes (Benedict Cumberbatch) solving various mysteries in modern-day London. Holmes is assisted in his mystery solving by his flatmate, friend and companion, Dr John Watson (Martin Freeman), who has returned from military service in Afghanistan with the Royal Army Medical Corps. Although Metropolitan Police Service Detective Inspector Greg Lestrade (Rupert Graves) and others are suspicious of Holmes at first, over time, his exceptional intellect and bold powers of observation persuade them of his value.

In part through Watson's blog documenting their adventures, Holmes becomes a reluctant celebrity with the press reporting on his cases and eccentric personal life. Both ordinary people and the British government ask for his help. Although the series depicts a variety of crimes and perpetrators, Holmes's conflict with his archenemy, Jim Moriarty (Andrew Scott), is a recurring feature. Molly Hooper (Louise Brealey), a pathologist at Barts Hospital, occasionally assists Holmes in his cases. Other recurring roles include Una Stubbs as Mrs Hudson, Holmes and Watson's landlady, series co-creator Mark Gatiss as Holmes's elder brother Mycroft, and Rupert Graves as Inspector Lestrade.

== Production ==
=== Conception and development ===
Steven Moffat and Mark Gatiss, Sherlock Holmes fans with experience of adapting or using Victorian literature for television, devised the concept of the series. Moffat had previously adapted the Strange Case of Dr Jekyll and Mr Hyde for the 2007 series Jekyll, while Gatiss had written the Dickensian Doctor Who episode "The Unquiet Dead". Moffat and Gatiss, both Doctor Who writers, discussed plans for a Holmes adaptation during their numerous train journeys to Cardiff where Doctor Who production is based. While they were in Monte Carlo for an awards ceremony, producer Sue Vertue, who is married to Moffat, encouraged Moffat and Gatiss to develop the project themselves before another creative team had the same idea. Moffat and Gatiss invited Stephen Thompson to write for the series in September 2008.

Gatiss criticised recent television adaptations of the Conan Doyle stories as "too reverential and too slow", aiming instead to be as irreverent to the canon as the 1930s and 1940s films starring Basil Rathbone and Nigel Bruce, which were mostly set in the then-contemporary interwar era. Benedict Cumberbatch's Sherlock uses modern technology, such as texting, the internet and GPS to solve crimes. Paul McGuigan, who directed two episodes of Sherlock, says that this is in keeping with Conan Doyle's character, pointing out that "[i]n the books he would use any device possible and he was always in the lab doing experiments. It's just a modern-day version of it. He will use the tools that are available to him today in order to find things out."

The update maintains various elements of the original stories, such as the Baker Street address and Holmes's adversary Moriarty. Some of these elements are transposed to the present day: for example, Martin Freeman's Watson has returned from military service in Afghanistan. While discussing the fact that the original Watson was invalided home, after serving in the Second Anglo-Afghan War (1878–80), Gatiss realised that "[i]t is the same war now, I thought. The same unwinnable war".

Sherlock was announced as a single 60-minute drama production at the Edinburgh International Television Festival in August 2008, with broadcast set for mid-to late 2009. The intention was to produce a series of six 60-minute episodes should the pilot prove to be successful. The first version of the pilot—reported by The Guardian to have cost £800,000—led to rumours within the BBC and wider media that Sherlock was a potential disaster. The BBC decided not to transmit the pilot, requesting a reshoot and a total of three 90-minute episodes. The original pilot was included on the DVD of the first series. During the audio commentary, the creative team said that the BBC were "very happy" with the pilot but asked them to change the format. Critic Mark Lawson observes that the pilot that was on air was "substantially expanded and rewritten, and completely reimagined in look, pace and sound". In July 2009, the BBC drama department announced plans for three 90-minute episodes, to be broadcast in 2010. Moffat had previously announced that if a series of Sherlock was commissioned, Gatiss would take over the duties of executive producer so that Moffat could concentrate on producing Doctor Who.

=== Cast and characters ===
Moffat and Vertue became interested in casting Cumberbatch as the title character after watching his performance in the 2007 film Atonement. The actor was cast after reading the script for the creative team. The part is modelled as a charismatic secondary psychopath or "high-functioning sociopath" as Sherlock self-describes, unlike Doyle's rendering as a primary psychopath according to Business Insider, thereby allowing more opportunity or ambiguity for traits of empathy. According to Screen Rant and a PhD thesis from De Montfort University, Cumberbatch's Sherlock is more anti-social and cruel to people around him compared to Doyle's character, which makes him more disliked by policemen who use his services. Cumberbatch said, "There's a great charge you get from playing him, because of the volume of words in your head and the speed of thought—you really have to make your connections incredibly fast. He is one step ahead of the audience and of anyone around him with normal intellect. They can't quite fathom where his leaps are taking him." Piers Wenger, head of drama at BBC Cymru Wales, described the series's rendering of Sherlock as "a dynamic superhero in a modern world, an arrogant, genius sleuth driven by a desire to prove himself cleverer than the perpetrator and the police—everyone in fact". Addressing changing social attitudes and broadcasting regulations, Cumberbatch's Holmes replaced the pipe with multiple nicotine patches. The writers believed that Sherlock should not talk like "a completely modern person", says Moffat, but were initially intent that "he never sounded like he's giving a lecture". Moffat turned the character "more Victorian" in the second series, capitalising more on Cumberbatch's "beautiful voice" to make it sound like "he's giving a lecture".

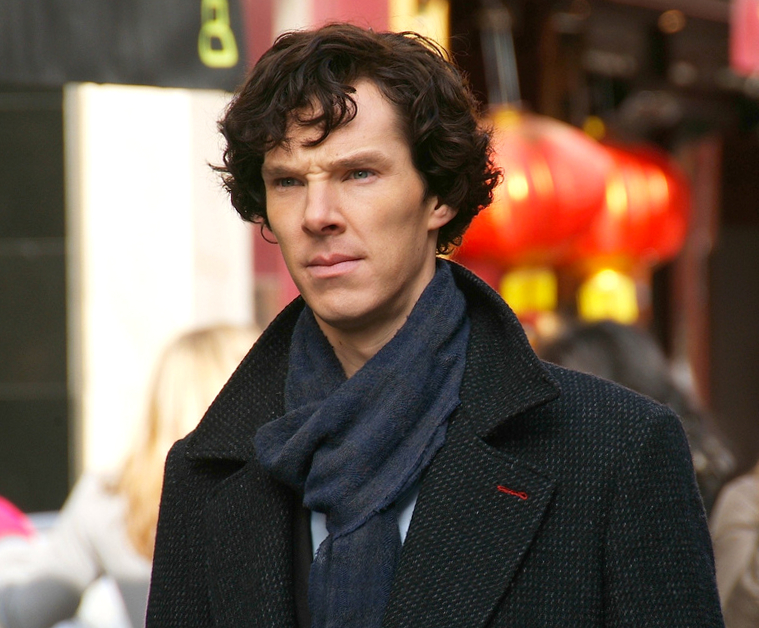
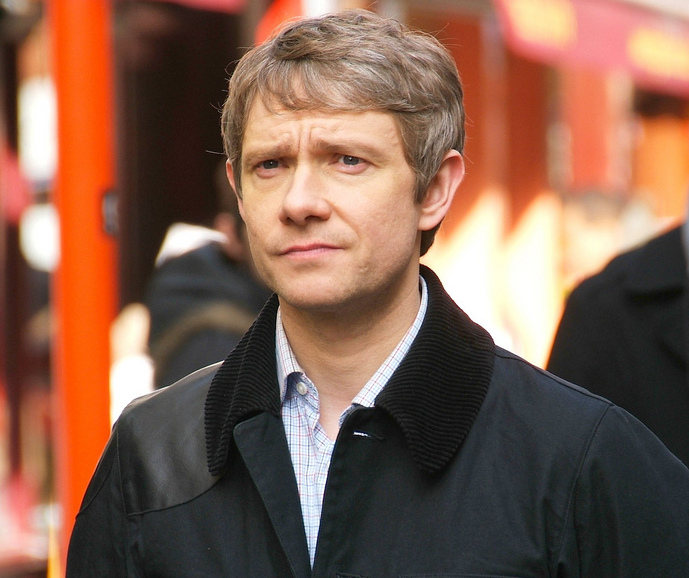
Benedict Cumberbatch (left) and Martin Freeman (right) during filming of the first series

In an interview with The Observer, co-creator Mark Gatiss says that they experienced more difficulty finding the right actor to play Dr John Watson than they had for the title character. Producer Sue Vertue said, "Benedict was the only person we actually saw for [the part of] Sherlock... Once Benedict was there it was really just making sure we got the chemistry for John [Watson]—and I think you get it as soon as they come into the room, you can see that they work together". Several actors auditioned for the part of Watson, and Martin Freeman eventually took the role. Steven Moffat said that Matt Smith was the first to audition unsuccessfully. He was rejected for being too "barmy", as the producers required someone "straighter" for Watson. Shortly after, Moffat cast Smith as the Eleventh Doctor in Doctor Who.

The writers said that Freeman's casting developed the way in which Cumberbatch played Holmes. The theme of friendship appealed to both Gatiss and Moffat. Gatiss asserted the importance of achieving the correct tone for the character. "Watson is not an idiot, although it's true that Conan Doyle always took the piss out of him", said Gatiss. "But only an idiot would surround himself with idiots." Moffat said that Freeman is "the sort of opposite of Benedict in everything except the amount of talent... Martin finds a sort of poetry in the ordinary man. I love the fastidious realism of everything he does." Freeman describes his character as a "moral compass" for Sherlock, who does not always consider the morality and ethics of his actions.

Rupert Graves was cast as DI Greg Lestrade. The writers referred to the character as "Inspector Lestrade" during development until Gatiss realised that in contemporary England the character would have the title "Detective Inspector". Moffat and Gatiss pointed out that Lestrade does not appear often in the stories and is quite inconsistently portrayed in them. They decided to go with the version that appeared in "The Adventure of the Six Napoleons": a man who is frustrated by Holmes but admires him, and whom Holmes considers as the best person at Scotland Yard. Several candidates took a comedic tack in their auditions, but the creative team preferred the gravitas that Graves brought to the role. His first name is revealed to be Greg in "The Hounds of Baskerville".

Andrew Scott made his first appearance as Jim Moriarty in "The Great Game". Moffat said, "We knew what we wanted to do with Moriarty from the very beginning. Moriarty is usually a rather dull, rather posh villain so we thought someone who was genuinely properly frightening. Someone who's an absolute psycho." Moffat and Gatiss were originally not going to put a confrontation between Moriarty and Holmes into these three episodes, but after seeing Scott's audition they realised that they "just had to do a confrontation scene. We had to do a version of the scene in 'The Final Problem' in which the two archenemies meet each other."

The regular cast includes Una Stubbs as Mrs Hudson and co-creator Mark Gatiss as Mycroft Holmes. Stubbs has known Cumberbatch since he was four years old, as she had worked with his mother Wanda Ventham. Vinette Robinson, Jonathan Aris and Louise Brealey play the recurring roles of Sergeant Sally Donovan, Philip Anderson and Molly Hooper, respectively. Amanda Abbington, Freeman's then real-life partner, plays Mary Morstan, Watson's girlfriend and eventual wife. In series three, Wanda Ventham and Timothy Carlton, Cumberbatch's actual parents, are introduced as Sherlock and Mycroft's parents. Guest appearances included Phil Davis as Jefferson Hope, Paul Chequer as DI Dimmock, Zoe Telford as Sarah, Gemma Chan as Soo Lin Yao, John Sessions as Kenny Prince, Haydn Gwynne as Miss Wenceslas, Deborah Moore as one of Moriarty's victims and Peter Davison as the voice-over in the planetarium. Series two's "A Scandal in Belgravia" featured Lara Pulver as Irene Adler, while "The Hounds of Baskerville" featured Russell Tovey as Henry Knight. In the final episode of series two, the role of Rufus Bruhl was played by Edward Holtom, while Katherine Parkinson played journalist Kitty Riley. The first episode of series three featured Derren Brown.

=== Production design and filming ===
The show was produced by Hartswood Films for BBC Wales, while BBC Worldwide also provided co-production funding. Production was also co-produced by PBS, a network of public-service broadcasters in the United States, for WGBH-TV's Masterpiece Mystery! strand. Filming of the pilot episode, written by Moffat and directed by Coky Giedroyc, commenced in January 2009. The first set of three episodes entered production 12 months later, in January 2010. Paul McGuigan directed the first and third episodes and Euros Lyn directed the second. The three episodes were filmed in reverse order of their broadcast.

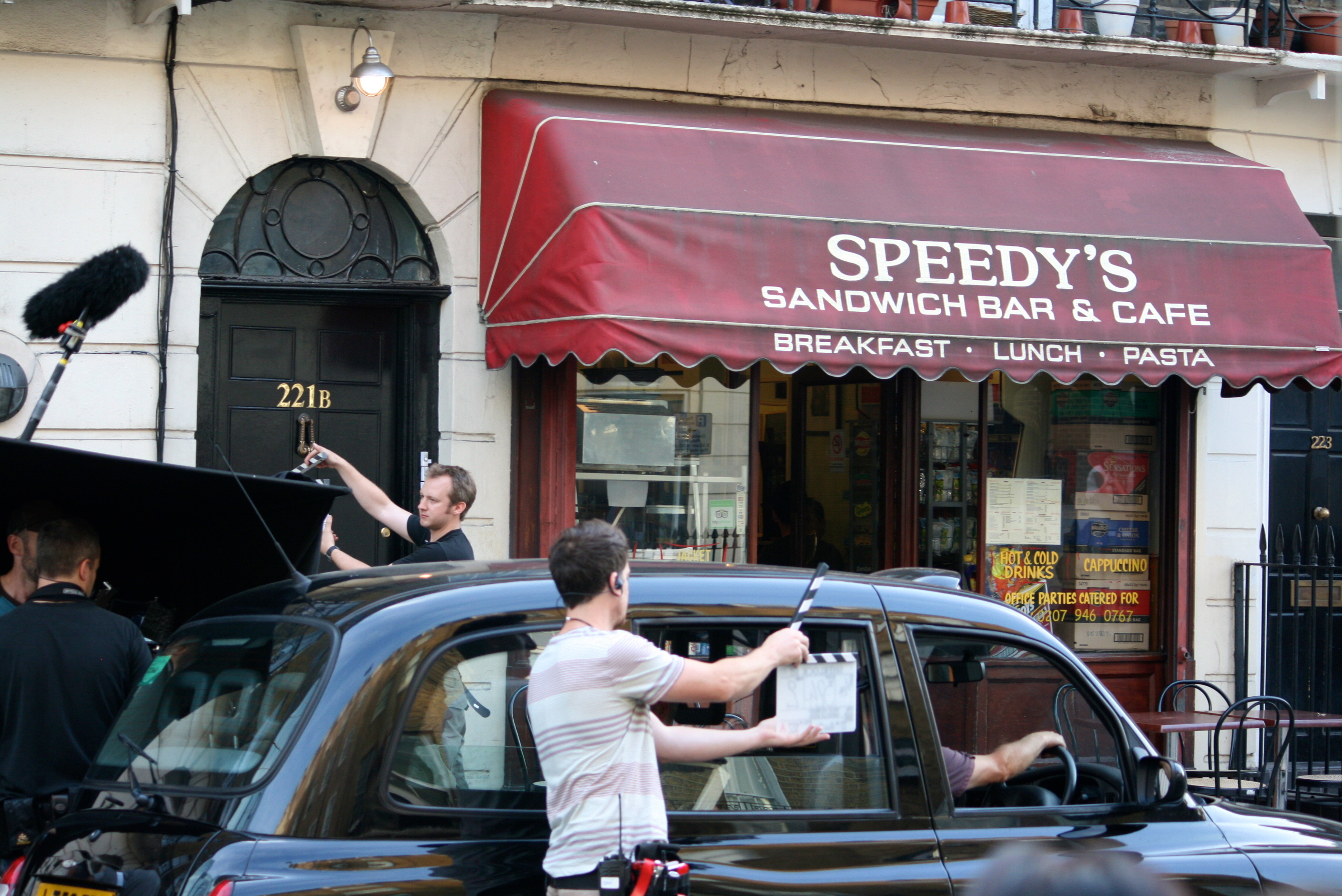
North Gower Street in London was used for exterior shots of the location of Holmes's “Baker Street" residence

Gatiss says that they wanted to "fetishise modern London in the way that the period versions fetishise Victorian London". Production was based at Hartswood Films' Cardiff production unit, Hartswood Films West, which was opened in late 2009 to take advantage of the BBC's planned Cardiff Bay "drama village". Production of the first two series was based at Upper Boat Studios, where Doctor Who had been produced. Filming in Cardiff was cheaper than in London, with some good matches for parts of London. Some architecture could not be faked, so location shooting in London was necessary. The location shots for 221B Baker Street were filmed at 187 North Gower Street – Baker Street was impractical because of heavy traffic and the number of things labelled "Sherlock Holmes", which would have needed to be disguised. Executive producer Beryl Vertue explained the importance of designing the entirety of Sherlock's flat as a contemporary set, yet still conveying his eccentricity. He would not, she said, live somewhere "too suburban" or "too modern".

Speedy's, the sandwich shop below the flat used as Holmes's residence, reported a sharp rise in new customers who recognised it from the show. Costumes for the pilot were designed by BAFTA Cymru award-winning costume designer Ray Holman. Cumberbatch wore a £1,000 Belstaff coat in the series. Sarah Arthur, the series's costume designer, explained how she achieved the detective's look: "Holmes wouldn't have any interest in fashion so I went for classic suits with a modern twist: narrow-leg trousers and a two-button, slim-cut jacket. I also went for slim-cut shirts and a sweeping coat for all the action scenes—it looks great against the London skyline."

The writers say that they did not want to force modernity onto the story. There were some creative challenges, such as the decision to include the sign "221B" on Holmes's front door. Gatiss and Moffat reflect that in the modern world the door would only display the number of the house, and there would be doorbells for each flat; however, the full house number is so iconic that they felt unable to change it. The writers also decided that the lead characters would address each other by their first names, rather than the traditional Holmes and Watson. This was also reflected in the title of the series. Director Paul McGuigan came up with the idea of putting text messages on the screen instead of having cut-away shots of a hand holding the phone.

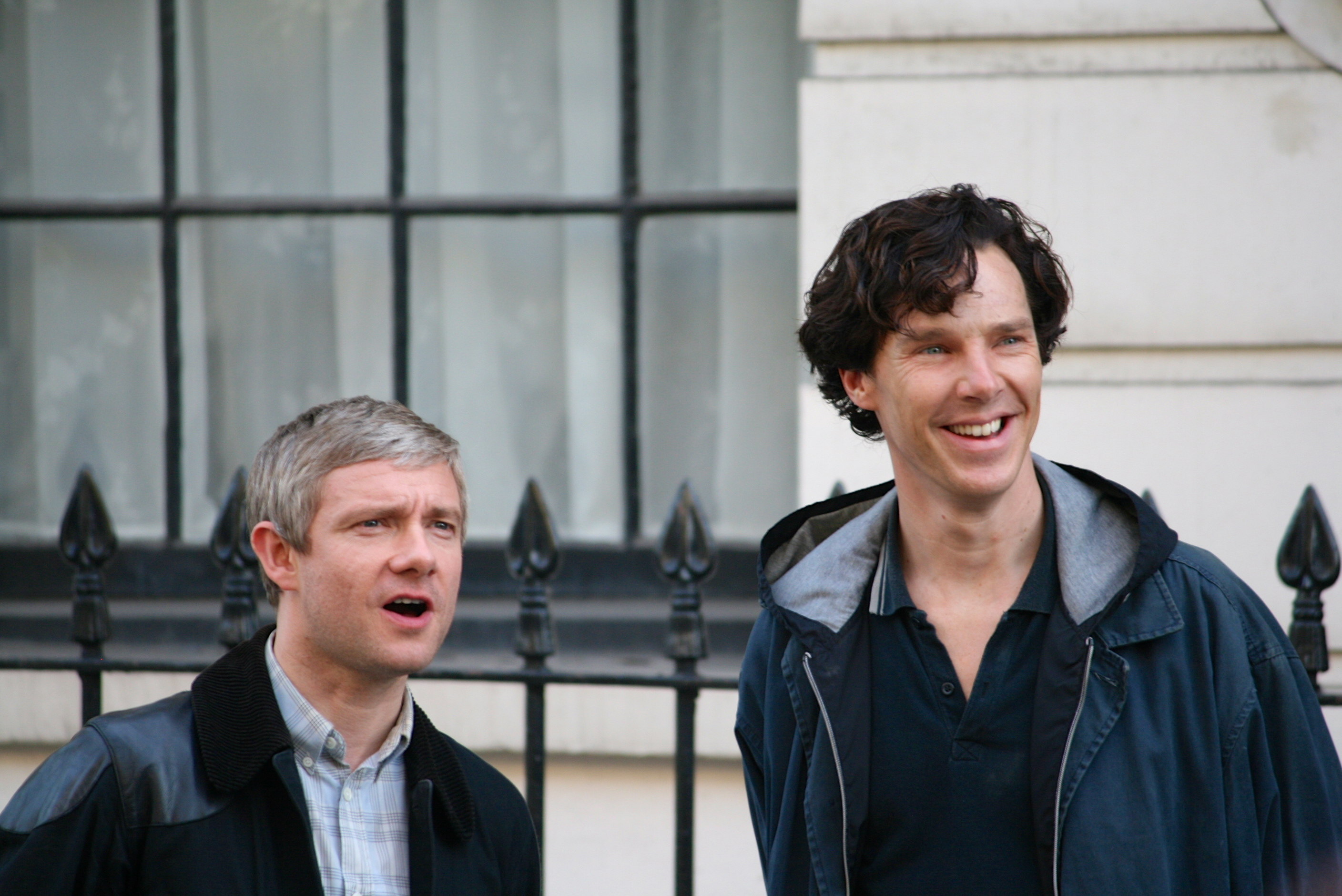
Martin Freeman and Benedict Cumberbatch filming the third series of Sherlock, August 2013

The producers found it difficult to coordinate the schedules of the principal players and Moffat and Gatiss for a second series. Cumberbatch and Freeman both worked on the 2012 film The Hobbit: An Unexpected Journey, and Moffat continued as Doctor Who's showrunner and head writer. In response to the time pressure, The Guardian asserted, the series "features reworkings of three of Conan Doyle's most recognised tales". Gatiss says that there had been an argument for producing these tales over three years, but Moffat explained that they rejected "deferred pleasure". The relationship between Holmes and Watson developed during the second series, with Watson being less amazed by Sherlock's deductive abilities; Watson acted as the primary detective in the second episode, "The Hounds of Baskerville". The cast and production team were more confident during the second series's production following the positive audience and critical reaction to the first series.

=== Music ===
The theme and incidental music were composed by David Arnold and Michael Price. Arnold explains that he and Price worked with the producers to "come up with a central theme and character" for the series, then found what was "going to be the defining sound of this show". Pieces were often constructed using synthesisers, but the tracks used for the show were recorded using real musicians, Arnold says, to bring the music "to life". Similarly, Price comments that the musicians can adapt their performance of a score by responding to footage from the show.

== Episodes ==
Four series, each consisting of three episodes, were produced. The first series was initially broadcast in July and August 2010 on the BBC, later premiering on Public Broadcasting Service (PBS) in the United States in October 2010. A second series of three episodes was first broadcast in the UK in January 2012, and then in the US during May 2012. The third series premiered in the UK on 1 January 2014 and in the US on 19 January 2014. The series has been sold to 180 territories. A special episode premiered on 1 January 2016, on BBC One and PBS, marking the first time the series has aired on the same day in the UK and US. The fourth series began airing on BBC One and PBS on 1 January 2017 and concluded on 15 January 2017.

Series	Episodes	Originally released		UK viewers (in millions)	US viewers (in millions)
Series	Episodes	First released	Last released	UK viewers (in millions)	US viewers (in millions)
1	3	25 July 2010	8 August 2010	8.37	—N/a
2	3	1 January 2012	15 January 2012	10.23	4.4
3	3	1 January 2014	12 January 2014	11.82	6.6
Special		1 January 2016		11.64	3.4
4	3	1 January 2017	15 January 2017	10.00	—N/a

=== Series 1 (2010) ===
The first episode, "A Study in Pink", loosely based upon the first Sherlock Holmes novel A Study in Scarlet, was written by Moffat and directed by Paul McGuigan. The story depicts the introduction of Sherlock to John, and them entering a flatshare at Baker Street in London, and then their investigation into a series of deaths, initially believed to be suicides. Mycroft Holmes, Sherlock's older brother, played by Mark Gatiss, also appears for the first time. The episode was first broadcast simultaneously on BBC One and BBC HD on 25 July 2010.

The second episode, "The Blind Banker", was first broadcast on 1 August 2010. Written by Stephen Thompson and directed by Euros Lyn, the episode depicts Holmes being hired by an old university acquaintance to investigate a mysterious break-in at a bank in the City of London.

The first series concluded with "The Great Game", first broadcast on 8 August 2010. The episode introduces the archenemy character, James Moriarty (played by Andrew Scott), to the series, who sets Holmes deadlines to solve a series of apparently unrelated cases. Written by Mark Gatiss and directed by McGuigan, "The Great Game" ends with a cliffhanger in which Sherlock and Moriarty reach a standoff involving a bomb attached to a vest removed moments earlier from Watson.

=== Series 2 (2012) ===
After the high ratings for "A Study in Pink", the BBC was reportedly eager to produce more episodes. On 10 August 2010, it was confirmed that Sherlock had been renewed for a second series. At the 2011 convention, Gatiss confirmed which stories would be adapted, and that the writers of the first series would each write an episode for series two. Acknowledging that "A Scandal in Bohemia", "The Hound of the Baskervilles" and "The Final Problem" are amongst the best-known Holmes stories, Gatiss explained, "We knew after having a successful first run that the natural order would be to do three of the most famous [stories]." "There's the question of how to go out on a cliffhanger and then the thematic things of the three stories, where we were trying to get to and what Sherlock and John's relationship is a little further on. You can't just go back to: 'You have no emotions.' 'I don't care.' You've got to move on somewhere and make sure the other characters have something of a journey too." Paul McGuigan directed the first two episodes, and Doctor Who director Toby Haynes handled the last one. The second series of three 90-minute episodes was initially planned to air in late 2011, but was delayed until early January 2012.

"A Scandal in Belgravia", written by Steven Moffat and directed by Paul McGuigan, was first broadcast on 1 January 2012. Loosely based on "A Scandal in Bohemia", the episode depicts Holmes's quest to retrieve compromising photos of a minor royal held on the camera phone of Irene Adler (Lara Pulver), a ruthless and brilliant dominatrix who also trades in classified information extracted from her rich and powerful clients.

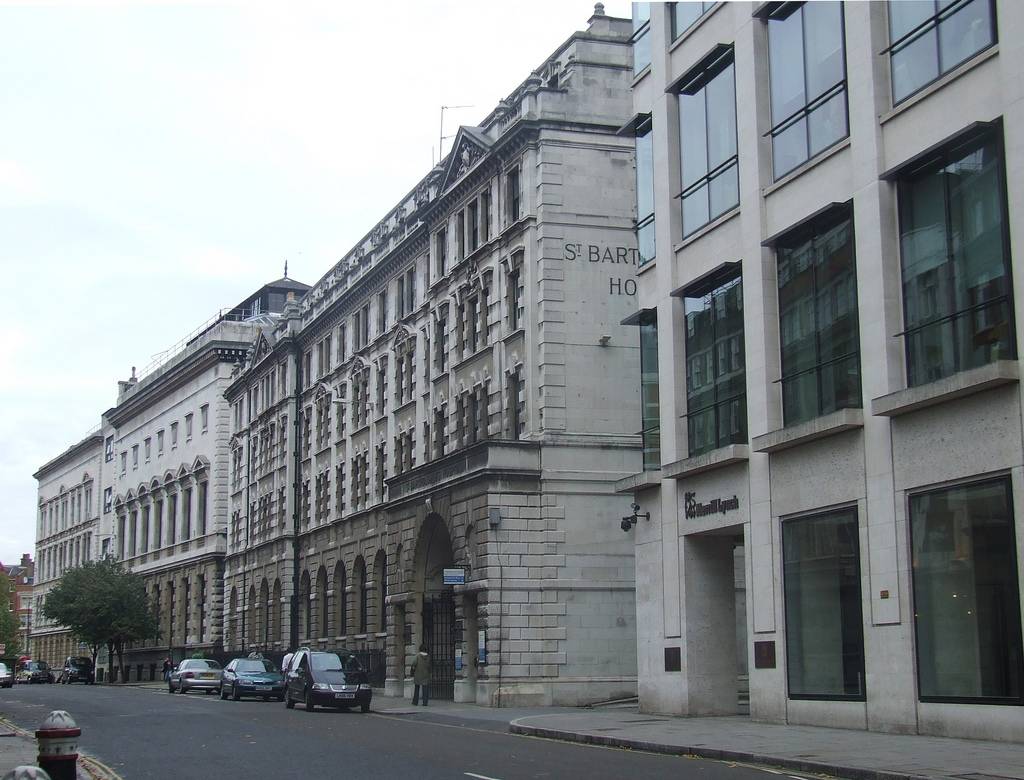
The resolution of Sherlock's faked suicide from the roof of St Bartholomew's Hospital in London attracted speculation in social media and newspapers.

Mark Gatiss wrote "The Hounds of Baskerville", which investigates the strange activities at a military base. Aware that The Hound of the Baskervilles, first published in 1902, was one of the most famous of Conan Doyle's original stories, Gatiss felt a greater responsibility to include familiar elements of the story than he does when adapting the lesser-known stories. Russell Tovey appeared as Henry Knight, a man whose father was ripped apart by a gigantic hound on Dartmoor 20 years earlier. Directed by McGuigan, the episode was first broadcast on 8 January 2012.

The second series concluded with "The Reichenbach Fall". Steve Thompson wrote the episode, which was directed by Toby Haynes, who had previously directed many of Moffat's Doctor Who episodes. First broadcast on 15 January 2012, the episode follows Moriarty's plot to discredit and kill Sherlock Holmes, concluding with Holmes appearing to die by suicide. The episode was inspired by Conan Doyle's story "The Final Problem", in which Holmes and Moriarty are presumed to have fallen to their deaths from the Reichenbach Falls in Switzerland. Moffat felt that he and co-creator Gatiss had outdone Conan Doyle in their version of Holmes's fall and Moffat added that, in that much-discussed sequence, there was still "a clue everybody's missed".

=== Christmas mini-episode (2013) ===
BBC One premiered a seven-minute Sherlock mini-episode over the 2013 Christmas period entitled "Many Happy Returns". The episode is available via BBC iPlayer, BBC Red Button service, and BBC's YouTube channel, and acts as a prequel to the third series. The synopsis for the episode reads, "Sherlock has been gone for two years. But someone isn't quite convinced that he's dead." That someone turns out to be Anderson, the forensics technician from series one and two, who has lost his job due to his obsessive conviction that Sherlock still lives. He had a long-standing mistrust of Sherlock, yet is one of the few people who believe Sherlock is alive, and is seen throughout the episode trying to convince Lestrade. Anderson tracks him via various mysterious events, from Tibet to New Delhi to Germany, in which Sherlock seems to be involved and points out that the incidents are getting progressively closer to London.

=== Series 3 (2014) ===
After the end of the final episode of the second series, Moffat and Gatiss both announced on Twitter that a third series had been commissioned at the same time as series two, and a part of the resolution to "The Reichenbach Fall" was filmed concurrently with series two. Without revealing whether Moriarty also faked his own death at the end of series two, Moffat suggested that Moriarty will not feature heavily in future series of Sherlock.

"The Empty Hearse", written by Mark Gatiss and directed by Jeremy Lovering, is the first episode of Series 3 and was first broadcast on 1 January 2014. Inspired by "The Adventure of the Empty House" by Sir Arthur Conan Doyle, the episode follows Sherlock Holmes's return to London and reunion with John Watson, and their subsequent solving of an underground terrorist network. The episode achieved an official rating of 12.72 million viewers, making it the highest rated drama episode shown on UK television in 2014.

In "The Sign of Three", written by Stephen Thompson, Mark Gatiss and Steven Moffat, Watson and Mary Morstan get married. The episode takes place during the wedding reception and the story is told through flashbacks. The episode title is inspired by The Sign of the Four, and was first broadcast on 5 January 2014.

The final episode "His Last Vow" was first broadcast on 12 January 2014, on BBC One, and written by Steven Moffat, directed by Nick Hurran and is based on Sir Arthur Conan Doyle's "The Adventure of Charles Augustus Milverton". This case leads Sherlock into conflict with Charles Augustus Magnussen (Lars Mikkelsen), a "terrifying" villain who was introduced as an unnamed villain in episode one. Mary Morstan and Sherlock Holmes both break into Magnussen's office, where, having surprised each other, Mary shoots Sherlock. Later, Holmes deduces that Mary was formerly a secret agent, and reveals this to Watson. Holmes and Watson try to get Magnussen arrested, but their attempt fails, and Holmes shoots Magnussen to stop him from blackmailing Mary Watson. Mycroft arranges that Sherlock will be exiled from the United Kingdom instead of being tried for murder. As Sherlock's plane takes off, every video screen in London broadcasts the image of Moriarty, and Sherlock is recalled to deal with the crisis associated with Moriarty's potential return.

The third series aired in the United States on PBS over a period of three weeks, airing late January to early February 2014.

=== Special (2016) ===
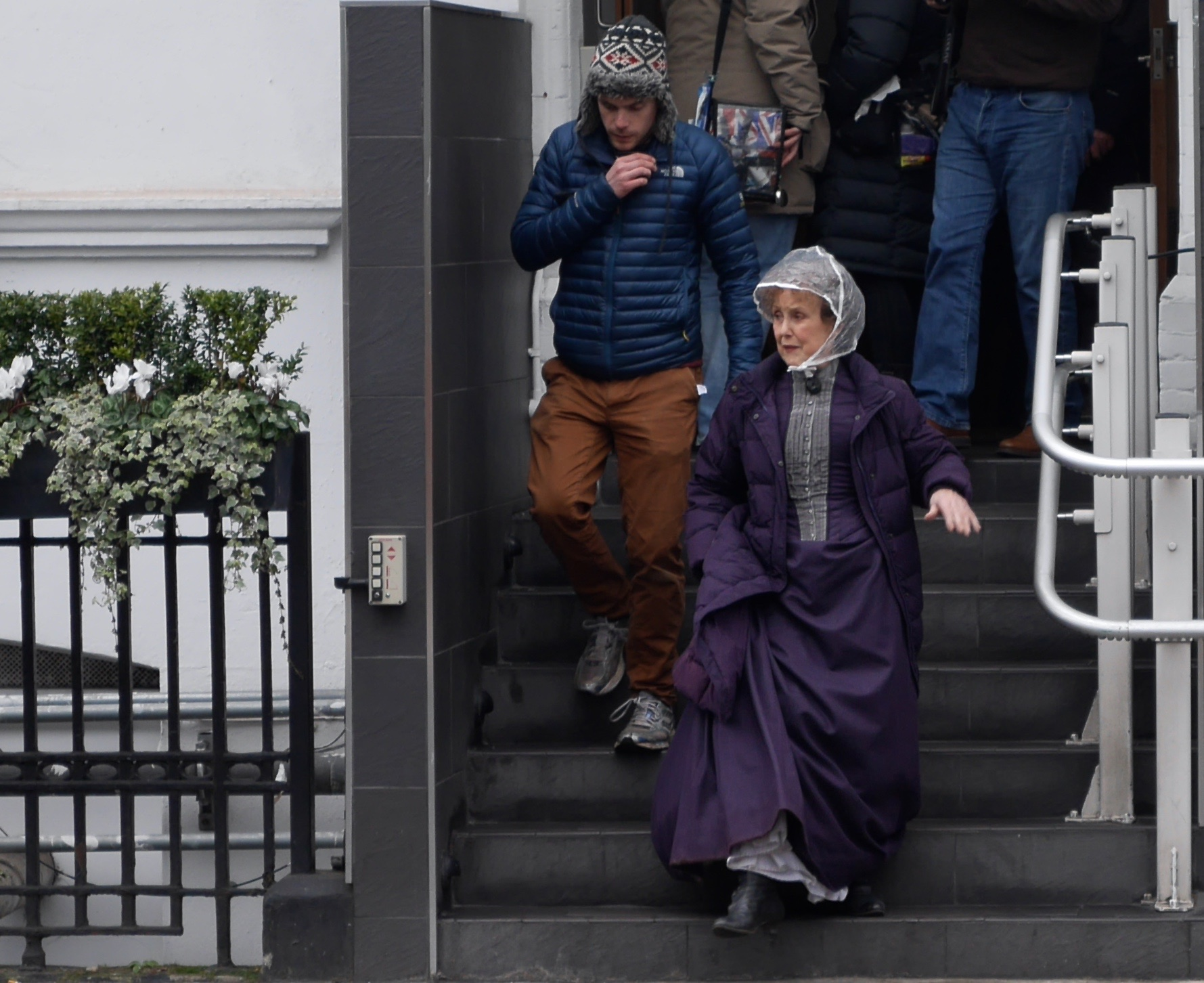
Stubbs pictured in costume for the episode, February 2015

On 2 July 2014, it was announced there would be a special episode broadcast between the third and fourth series. Filming began on 5 January 2015 and wrapped on 10 February 2015. Moffat confirmed the episode is set in Victorian London, saying, "The special is its own thing. We wouldn't have done the story we're doing, and the way we're doing it, if we didn't have this special. It's not part of the run of three episodes. So we had this to do it … It's kind of in its own little bubble."

In October 2015, the title of the episode was announced. It was broadcast on 1 January 2016 at 9:00 pm local time on BBC One in the UK, and on PBS in the US. The episode was simulcast in British cinemas on 1 January, and was shown on 5 and 6 January 2016 in selected cinemas throughout the US. Exclusive bonus material in the cinema presentation included a guided tour of 221B Baker Street from Steven Moffat and a look behind the scenes at how the special episode was made featuring all the lead cast and crew.

=== Series 4 (2017) ===
By October 2013, a fourth series was commissioned, with scripts planned. Moffat told The Telegraph in January 2014, "we're all keen to continue", but said it had been difficult to co-ordinate the lead actors' schedules. Filming began on 4 April 2016 at Pinewood Studio Wales, and lasted until 5 August. In May 2016, it was announced that Toby Jones had been cast as a villain from Sherlock Holmes lore. The fourth series premiered on 1 January 2017, with "The Six Thatchers". The second episode "The Lying Detective" aired on 8 January 2017; the last episode "The Final Problem" aired on 15 January 2017.

=== Future ===
During the production of the fourth series, many Sherlock fans erroneously believed that the series would have a "secret fourth episode", and the television miniseries Apple Tree Yard was a cover for this. The rumour was proven to be false, leading to some controversy within the fandom.

In January 2014, Moffat stated that a fifth series had been plotted by himself and Gatiss; however, by the release of the fourth series in January 2017, they had not yet decided whether to produce it. Cumberbatch and Moffat in particular have expressed interest in continuing at some point in the future, but there are no immediate plans. Moffat also stated that due to the conflicting schedules of Cumberbatch and Freeman, a potential fifth series is still up in the air. Freeman has expressed the opinion that Sherlock is "never a completely shut door" and noted his interest in returning to the programme should the material be of sufficient quality. Gatiss stated in July 2025 that Cumberbatch and Freeman were "not interested" in a new series.

== Reception ==
=== Critical response ===
Critical response of Sherlock
Series	Rotten Tomatoes	Metacritic
1	93% (60 reviews)	85 (17 reviews)
2	94% (85 reviews)	91 (24 reviews)
3	91% (126 reviews)	88 (23 reviews)
Special	62% (39 reviews)	—N/a
4	54% (123 reviews)	—N/a

The show received critical acclaim: the first three series each received positive reviews, while the fourth has received mixed reviews. Series one holds a Metacritic score of 85/100, based on 17 reviews, and series two scored 91/100, based on 24 reviews, while series three holds a score of 88/100, based on 22 reviews. The first series holds a 93% rating at critical aggregator site Rotten Tomatoes, the second holds a 94% rating, and the third series has a 91% approval rating. The fourth series holds a rating of 56%.

The first episode rated highly on the Appreciation Index. The Observer said the show was "a cross between Withnail and I and The Bourne Ultimatum, there is also a hint of Doctor Who about the drama; hardly surprising, since it has been written and created by Doctor Who writers Mark Gatiss and Steven Moffat." The Guardian's Dan Martin said, "It's early days, but the first of three 90-minute movies, 'A Study in Pink', is brilliantly promising. It has the finesse of Spooks but is indisputably Sherlock Holmes. The deduction sequences are ingenious, and the plot is classic Moffat intricacy." Tom Sutcliffe for The Independent wrote, "Sherlock is a triumph, witty and knowing, without ever undercutting the flair and dazzle of the original. It understands that Holmes isn't really about plot but about charisma ... Flagrantly unfaithful to the original in some respects, Sherlock is wonderfully loyal to it in every way that matters." The lead actors were commended. Critic Victoria Thorpe said, "Freeman's dependable, capable Watson unlocks this modern Holmes, a man who now describes himself as 'a high-functioning sociopath'." The Guardian says that Cumberbatch "has a reputation for playing odd, brilliant men very well, and his Holmes is cold, techie, slightly Asperger-ish". Following the second series's opening episode, Sarah Crompton, for The Telegraph, asserts that "Cumberbatch is utterly credible as a man who lives entirely in his cerebellum with little regard for the world outside, mak[ing] Sherlock the perfect depiction of Holmes for our times". David Weigand of the SF Gate called Cumberbatch "A Sherlock for the 21st century." Jace Lacob of BuzzFeed wrote, "Back from the dead and better than ever."

Conan Doyle fans were generally appreciative. Gwilym Mumford, for The Guardian, suggested that "this has to do with the fact that Moffat and Gatiss are enormously knowledgeable about Conan Doyle's work, and their reimagining incorporates big- and small-screen adaptations of Holmes, as well as the original stories. As Gatiss puts it: 'Everything is canonical.'" Sarah Crompton, for The Telegraph, identifies some of the jokes and allusions intended for fans. Commenting specifically on the second series's finale "The Reichenbach Fall", The Guardian's Sam Wollaston praised the show's faithfulness to Conan Doyle, but also how "it will wander, taking in mobile phone technology and computer hacking ... But it doesn't feel like cheating; more like an open relationship, agreed by both parties."

By the fourth series, it was being reviewed poorly. Roisin O'Connor, writing for The Independent about its opening episode, stated that the series had become a "grotesque parody of the witty, faithful TV adaptation it once was", with O'Connor stating that the decline dated to the end of the second series. Aja Romano, writing for Vox about the fourth series, criticised the show as having "floundered", describing it as "indulging in cockamamie leaps of logic and inexplicable fantasies, with barely any character development to back them up". Romano went on to ascribe the problems of the series to it "never [knowing] whether its current season would be its last" due to the rise to stardom of its main actors, and the show's "unearned love with itself" meaning that "plots never had enduring consequences". Stuart Heritage, reviewing the final episode of series four for The Guardian, described the show as having become "an annoying self-parody" and, asking whether the series as a whole had worked, concluded that their answer was "probably not". In 2019, Sherlock was ranked 60th on The Guardian's list of the 100 best TV shows of the 21st century.

Maria Konnikova, author of Mastermind: How to Think Like Sherlock Holmes, has taken issue with Sherlock claiming to be "a high functioning sociopath", in response to being called a psychopath (this claim is asserted throughout the show). Konnikova opines that sociopath is just an outdated term for psychopath, that psychopaths do not admit their psychopathy, and that Sherlock does not evidence psychopathic behaviour. She asserts that his coldness is because of his assertion of logical reasoning, rather than an inability to feel otherwise, as well as emotions of guilt, regret and acceptance of failure he is shown to have.

=== Ratings ===
According to overnight data provided by the Broadcasters' Audience Research Board (BARB), the highest overnight figure from the first series of Sherlock was 7.5 million for the opening episode, "A Study in Pink", whereas the second series averaged over 8 million viewers. The three episodes of series two were the three most watched programmes on iPlayer, the BBC's video-on-demand service, between January and April 2012. Its opening episode, "A Scandal in Belgravia", attracted controversy from the tabloid newspaper Daily Mail, which reported that Irene Adler's nude scene early in the episode had been met with disapproval from some viewers who were concerned that it had been shown before the 9:00 pm watershed hour, before which adult-oriented content is not supposed to air. Some critics also took exception to Moffat's treatment of Irene Adler, arguing that she was sexualised, an argument rejected by Radio Times writer Laura Pledger as well as Moffat himself. The series's conclusion, "The Reichenbach Fall", in which Sherlock fakes his suicide by jumping from St Bartholomew's Hospital, led to speculation on forums, social networking sites and in newspaper articles about its resolution.

The third series became the UK's most watched drama series since 2001. An average 11.82 million people watched the series, with about 12.72 million tuning in for the first episode. The 2016 New Year's Day special drew 11.64 million viewers. The fourth series opened with 11.3 million viewers for the first episode, but dropped to 5.9 million by the final episode of the fourth series, the lowest overnight ever recorded by the show.

=== Accolades ===
In the 2011 BAFTA awards, the show as a whole won the award for Best Drama Series, while Freeman (as Dr Watson) won the award for the Best Supporting Actor. Cumberbatch was nominated for Best Actor. Andrew Scott won 2012's Best Supporting Actor, beating Freeman, for his work in the second series, which was nominated in other categories.

Following multiple nominations for the 63rd Primetime Emmy Awards (2011) and 64th Primetime Emmy Awards (2012), the show won multiple Emmys at the 66th Primetime Emmy Awards (2014), including Primetime Emmy Award for Outstanding Lead Actor in a Miniseries or a Movie for Cumberbatch, Primetime Emmy Award for Outstanding Supporting Actor in a Miniseries or a Movie for Freeman and Primetime Emmy Award for Outstanding Writing for a Miniseries, Movie or a Dramatic Special for Moffat. It subsequently won the Emmy for Outstanding Television Movie at the 68th Primetime Emmy Awards (2016). The first series also won the Arqiva award for the "best terrestrial show" at the 2011 Edinburgh International Television Festival. "A Study in Pink" and "A Scandal in Belgravia" were nominated for Emmy Awards in a variety of categories. The series won several BAFTA Cymru awards: television drama, Director: Fiction (Euros Lyn), Director of Photography: Fiction (Steve Lawes), Production Design (Arwel Wyn Jones), and Make Up & Hair (Claire Pritchard-Jones). Charlie Phillips won the Editing: Fiction category at the British Academy Television Craft Awards. The show was also nominated for the YouTube Audience Award.

In August 2020, Sherlock was commemorated on series of UK postage stamps issued by the Royal Mail. Six stamps feature characters played by Cumberbatch, Freeman, Abbington, and Scott, and the stamps feature secret storylines revealed under UV light.

== Home media and merchandise ==
=== DVD and Blu-ray release ===
Series	DVD/Blu-ray release dates			Additional features
Series	Region 1/A	Region 2/B	Region 4/B	Additional features
1	9 November 2010	30 August 2010	4 November 2010	Audio commentaries "A Study in Pink" and "The Great Game"; "Unlocking Sherlock" documentary; Original pilot version of "A Study in Pink"
2	22 May 2012	23 January 2012	1 March 2012	Audio commentaries "A Scandal in Belgravia" and "The Hounds of Baskerville"; "Sherlock Uncovered" documentary
3	11 February 2014	20 January 2014	20 February 2014	Featurettes: "The Fall", "Fans, Villains, and Speculation: The Legacy of Sherlock Holmes", and "Shooting Sherlock"
Special	12 January 2016	11 January 2016	3 February 2016	A Study in Sherlock: "Making of" production documentary; Behind-the-scenes, interviews with Moffat and Gatiss; Sherlockology Q&A
4	24 January 2017	23 January 2017	15 February 2017	Featurettes: "Behind 221B", "Script to Screen", "The Writers Chat", "Production Diary", "221B Set Timelapse"; The Set Tour, with Mark Gatiss

In November 2018, Series 1 was released in 4k UHD Blu-ray by the BBC. Due to poor sales figures, this is the only series on 4K with no current plans for a future release.

=== Books and websites ===
BBC Books published some of Conan Doyle's original collections and novels as tie-in editions, with cover art featuring Cumberbatch and Freeman. A Study in Scarlet and The Adventures of Sherlock Holmes were released in autumn 2011, with introductions by Moffat and Gatiss respectively. The Hound of the Baskervilles, The Sign of Four and The Memoirs of Sherlock Holmes were released in March 2012, with introductions by Cumberbatch, Freeman and Thompson respectively. Two more books, The Return of Sherlock Holmes and His Last Bow, were released in December 2013, ahead of the premiere of the third series. They featured introductions by Gatiss and Moffat respectively. According to Radio Times, the popularity of Sherlock has led to a resurgence in the sales of the original Conan Doyle stories. Publishers and retailers reported a 180% rise in sales of Sherlock Holmes books during the first series's broadcast.

Sherlock: The Casebook, a companion book to the series written by Guy Adams, was published by BBC Books in the United Kingdom in October 2012. The book was republished in the United States under the title The Sherlock Files: The Official Companion to the Hit Television Series in July 2013. In Japan, a manga adaptation of the first series illustrated by Jay was serialised in Kadokawa's Young Ace magazine from 4 October 2012. The English translation of this manga series was released by Titan Comics in the UK and US beginning on 8 June 2016. In October 2012, Winning Moves sold a Sherlock-themed edition of Cluedo. The first episode of the second series (A Scandal in Belgravia) was adapted, with Sherlock: A Scandal In Belgravia: Part 1 (ISBN 9781787733169) being released by Titan Books in the UK in July 2020, with Part 2 (ISBN 9781785865497) published in March 2022.

BBC Online published several tie-in websites relating to the show's fictional world. These were written by Joseph Lidster, who had also contributed to the Doctor Who tie-in websites. Two websites – thescienceofdeduction.co.uk and johnwatsonblog.co.uk – feature the events from the show in the form of puzzles and case-summaries, often with comments (for example, by John Watson's sister, "Harry"). There are also several blogs about "unseen" cases that do not feature on television. Similar to the broadcast cases, these retain familiar elements from classic Arthur Conan Doyle stories: "The Geek Interpreter" instead of "The Greek Interpreter", and "The Six Thatchers" instead of "The Six Napoleons". On the websites, links can be found to Molly Hooper's diary and the official website of Connie Prince.

=== Clothing ===
The show's popularity resulted in enquiries for coats similar to Sherlock's, reported retailer Debenhams. Garment manufacturer Belstaff put the wool trench coat worn by Benedict Cumberbatch back into production before the series had ended. The Independent reported, "designer Paul Costelloe moved to meet the demand, offering tailored coats and scarves based on the series, while Savile Row bespoke tailor John Pearse said many of his clients were inquiring about the actors' clothes". Journalist Alexis Petridis commented, "[Y]ou can see why men wanted to get the look. Perhaps they noted the effect Cumberbatch, by no means your standard telly hunk, had on lady viewers ... and decided it must have something to do with the clobber. So it is that Britain's latest men's style icon is a fictional asexual sociopath first seen onscreen hitting a corpse with a horse whip. Surely not even the great detective himself could have deduced that was going to happen."

=== Games ===
In January 2014, the show launched its official mobile app Sherlock: The Network, which was created by The Project Factory in association with Hartswood Films. Benedict Cumberbatch and Martin Freeman appear in cameo roles as Holmes and Dr Watson, respectively. In June 2018, it was announced that a live Sherlock experience, Sherlock: The Game Is Now, would be opening in London in October 2018. The experience was written by Moffat and Gatiss, and would feature audio and video scenes with "original Sherlock cast members". The experience, which is built in the West 12 shopping centre in Shepherd's Bush and designed by the escape room creators of London's Time Run, begins in 221B Baker Street and requires teams to solve mysteries to progress along through the 60-minute game.

== See also ==
- Johnlock, Sherlock-inspired shipping
