= The Abominable Bride =

- Sherlock episode
- Promotional release poster
- Episode no.: Episode 10
- Directed by: Douglas Mackinnon
- Written by: Mark Gatiss; Steven Moffat
- Cinematography by: Suzie Lavelle
- Editing by: Andrew McClelland
- Original air date: 1 January 2016
- Running time: 93 minutes

Guest appearances
- Andrew Scott as James Moriarty; Jonathan Aris as Anderson; Yasmine Akram as Janine Donlevy; Catherine McCormack as Lady Carmichael; Tim McInnerny as Sir Eustace Carmichael; Natasha O'Keeffe as Emelia Ricoletti; Stephanie Hyam as Jane

Episode chronology
← Previous "His Last Vow"	Next → "The Six Thatchers"

"The Abominable Bride" is a special episode of the British television programme Sherlock. The episode was broadcast on BBC One, PBS and Channel One on 1 January 2016. It depicts the characters of the show in an alternative timeline: the Victorian London setting of the original stories by Arthur Conan Doyle. The title is based on the quote "Ricoletti of the club-foot and his abominable wife" from "The Adventure of the Musgrave Ritual" (1893), which refers to a case mentioned by Holmes. The story also draws on elements of original Conan Doyle stories of Holmes such as "The Five Orange Pips" (1891) and "The Final Problem" (1893).

The episode won the Primetime Emmy Award for Outstanding Television Movie, the first win of the series in that category.

== Plot ==
In the 19th century, Dr. John Watson has been medically discharged from the Army and moves to London. Watson is introduced to Sherlock Holmes by a fellow student of Bart's, and becomes interested in his investigative principles. Holmes invites Watson to share his new flat in Baker Street, which Watson accepts.

In 1895, Inspector Lestrade arrives and presents Holmes and Watson with a puzzling case: Emelia Ricoletti, a consumptive woman in bridal dress, had fired on by-passers in the street from a balcony before fatally shooting herself. Later that evening, Mr. Ricoletti was confronted by Emelia, who shot him dead before disappearing into the fog. Fascinated by Emelia's apparent survival, Holmes takes the case. At the morgue, Dr. Hooper informs Holmes that the woman who killed herself, the woman who murdered Mr. Ricoletti and the body on hand have all been positively identified as Emelia Ricoletti. When the Bride apparently returns to murder other men, Sherlock deduces that these are copycat crimes.

Months later, Holmes' brother Mycroft refers a case to him: Lady Carmichael's husband, Sir Eustace Carmichael, appeared terrified when he received an envelope full of orange pips (seeds). When she asked what it means, he initially said "death" but then brushed it off as "nothing." Two subsequent episodes occurred at night. In the first Lord Carmichael was again terrified and claimed to have seen the Bride outside the windows. In the second, Lady Carmichael found him out on the grounds, transfixed by the Bride standing before him, her face covered by a veil. The Bride – who he identified as Emelia Ricoletti – threatened him with death, but when he fell to the ground in a faint, she disappeared.

When Holmes and Watson meet with him, Sir Eustace is uncooperative, claiming that he sleepwalks and describing his wife as "an hysteric." Holmes and Watson stake out the house for the evening. When a ghostly-looking Bride appears and disappears in front of them, they hear the sound of breaking glass, followed by screams from both Sir Eustace and Lady Carmichael. They discover Sir Eustace stabbed to death by what appears to be Emelia, who then escapes through a broken window. Lestrade arrives and observes a note attached to the dagger, which Holmes says was not there when he found the body. The note reads, "Miss me?", a phrase used by the modern-day James Moriarty. After insisting that the case's solution is so simple that even Lestrade could solve it, Holmes meditates. Moriarty appears and insults Holmes about the mystery of Emelia's apparent post-suicide revival, alluding to his similar apparent death in the present. Moriarty appears to shoot himself in the head but remains alive.

In the present day, it is revealed that the events of Victorian England are actually occurring within Sherlock's drug-laden Mind Palace. The plane has returned to England minutes after taking off after Moriarty's broadcast, and Mycroft, John, and Mary enter the plane to find a frustrated Sherlock rambling about the unsolved Ricoletti case. Sherlock explains he had hoped to solve the case, believing it would prove crucial to solving Moriarty's return.

Victorian Holmes awakens, with an awareness of events of the present as a seeming hallucination induced by cocaine. He receives a telegram from Mary Watson saying she has found Emelia's co-conspirators at a desanctified church. There, Holmes and Watson discover and interrupt a secret group of the Women's Rights Movement, whose members include Dr. Hooper, Janine Hawkins, and Watson's maidservant. Holmes explains that they used a double to fake Emelia's death, allowing her to kill her husband and create the persona of the avenging ghost Bride. Already dying, she was later killed at her request by being shot through the mouth. The duplicate corpse was replaced by Emelia's actual corpse, the one Holmes and Watson saw at the morgue, for a positive identification. Since then, the women have used the persona of the Bride to murder men who wronged them. Sherlock surmises that Lady Carmichael, being a member of the society, killed her husband. He makes his accusation to the approaching Bride, assuming that it is Lady Carmichael. When he lifts the bride's veil, however, he finds that the "Bride" is actually Moriarty, who tells him the scenario doesn't make sense because "it's not real".

Sherlock reawakens in the present, where he insists on finding Emelia's grave to prove that her body-double was buried under the coffin. While digging, he hears Emelia's corpse repeatedly whisper "Do not forget me". The corpse moves to attack him, leading Holmes to realize he is not actually awake. He then "awakens" in the past on a ledge next to the Reichenbach Falls. Moriarty appears and tells Holmes he is still trapped in his Mind Palace, causing Holmes to realise that this is just another episode in the same dream. The men fight and Moriarty gains the upper hand, but Watson appears and holds Moriarty at gunpoint. Watson kicks Moriarty off the ledge and then asks Holmes how he can awaken into the present. Holmes decides to dive over the ledge, having confidence he will survive.

Sherlock wakes up in the present on the plane. Mycroft asks John to look after Sherlock, hoping he will not use drugs again. After John leaves the plane, Mycroft opens Sherlock's notebook, revealing the word "Redbeard". Sherlock concludes that, like Ricoletti, Moriarty did indeed die but arranged with others to carry out plans after his death. The episode ends with Victorian Holmes describing his visions of aeroplanes and mobile telephones to a cynical Watson, before looking out the window onto Baker Street in the present day.

== Filming ==
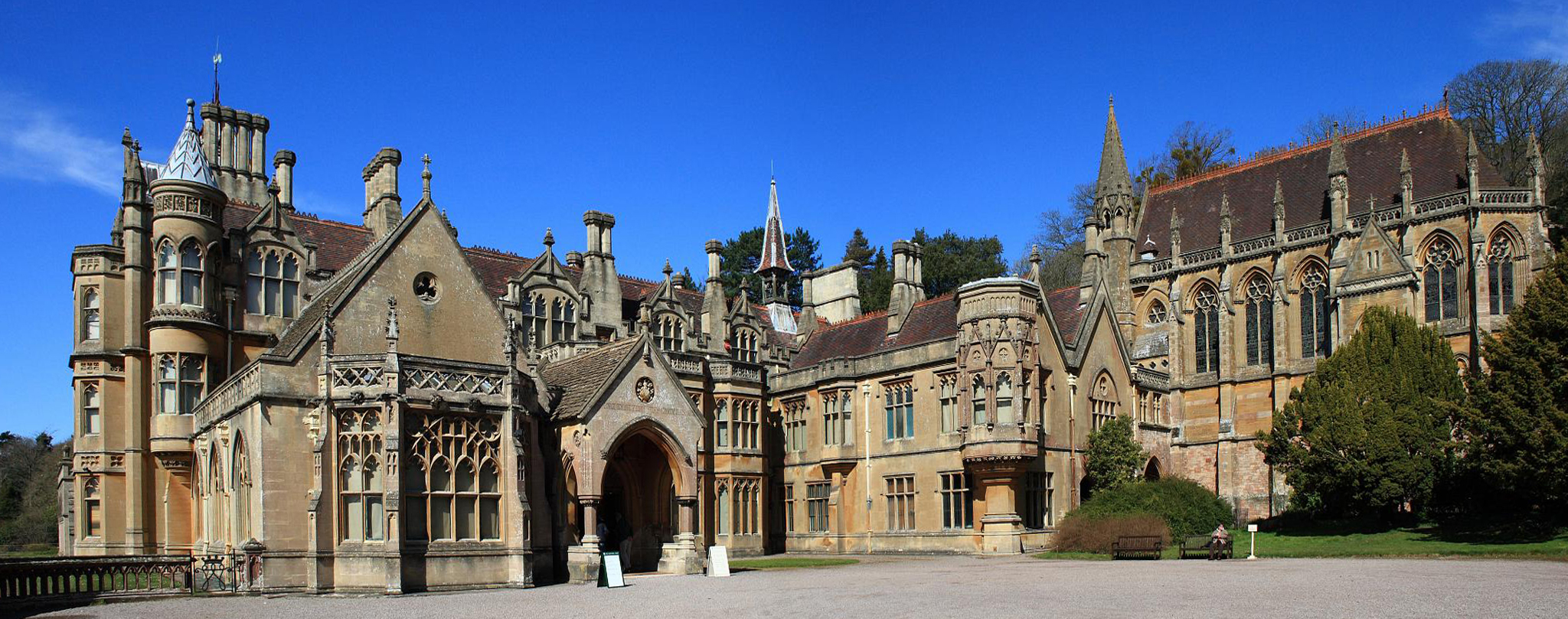
Panoramic view of the entrance area of Tyntesfield.

Filming took place at Tyntesfield House, a National Trust property at Wraxall, near Bristol. Scenes were also shot in the cellars of Colston Hall and at Arnos Vale Cemetery in Bristol, and other locations in Bath, Somerset. Tyntesfield was mainly used as Sir Eustace's house but also the Watsons' London home.

The final scene of the episode puts forth a possible concept that all of the series in its modern-day setting are actually playing out from within Victorian Holmes' Mind Palace. Mark Gatiss stated in Sherlock: The Abominable Bride Post-Mortem:

By having that scene right at the end, where we go back to Victorian London – Victorian Baker Street – and Sherlock explicitly says, "It's an imagined version of what I think the future might be," we have really opened a ridiculous window that the entire series of Sherlock might be the drug-induced ravings of the Victorian Sherlock Holmes. Which means we can do absolutely anything.

== Cast ==
- Benedict Cumberbatch as Sherlock Holmes
- Martin Freeman as Dr. John Watson
- Una Stubbs as Mrs. Hudson
- Rupert Graves as Inspector Lestrade
- Mark Gatiss as Mycroft Holmes
- Andrew Scott as Professor James Moriarty
- Louise Brealey as Molly Hooper
- Amanda Abbington as Mary Watson
- Jonathan Aris as Anderson
- Yasmine Akram as Janine Donlevy
- David Nellist as Stamford
- Catherine McCormack as Lady Carmichael
- Tim McInnerny as Sir Eustace Carmichael
- Natasha O'Keeffe as Emelia Ricoletti
- Tim Barlow as Wilder
- Gerald Kyd as Thomas Ricoletti
- Stephanie Hyam as Jane

== Holmesian references ==
Moriarty's stating "There is nothing new under the sun. It has all been done before" comes from one of Arthur Conan Doyle's original Sherlock Holmes stories, A Study in Scarlet. But also refers to the Biblical book of Ecclesiastes (Ch1 Vs9): "What has been will be again, what has been done will be done again; there is nothing new under the sun."

Mycroft's mentioning of the Manor House Case references "The Greek Interpreter".

== Broadcast ==
In the UK, "The Abominable Bride" pulled in strong ratings overnight, scoring more than 8.4 million viewers on New Year's Day for BBC One. The final, official consolidated rating after seven days was 11.6m viewers making it the most watched programme of the week in the UK.

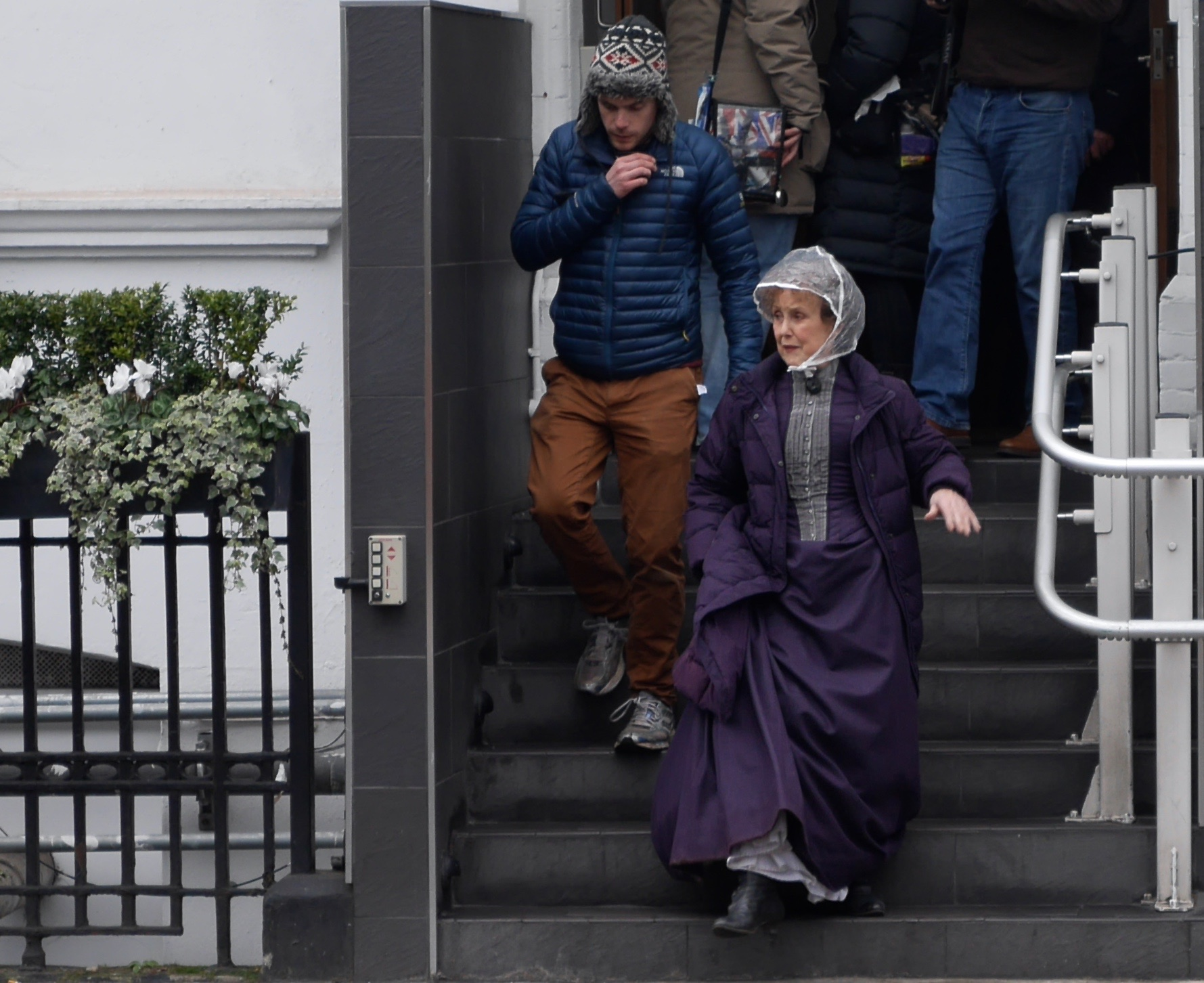
Una Stubbs pictured in costume as Mrs Hudson for the episode in February 2015.

The episode was broadcast from 9 p.m. on BBC One, PBS and OTE Cinema 4 HD and in the United Kingdom it was simulcast in 100 cinemas nationwide.

In a special extended version featuring twenty minutes of additional footage, including a guided set-tour of 221B Baker Street with executive producer Moffat and a short making-of with Cumberbatch and Freeman, "The Abominable Bride" was granted a limited release in theatres in Hong Kong, Denmark and Australia on 2 January 2016, in Finland on 3 January 2016, a full release in China on 4 January and a limited release across the United Kingdom and the United States on 5–6 January 2016 and in Italy on 12–13 January 2016. It was released in Japan on 19 February 2016. it was also shown in cinemas in Russia, Armenia, Ukraine, Belarus and Kazakhstan.

In cinemas, the film (along with the bonus footage) held strong, particularly in China and South Korea bringing in $5.39 million (£3.68m) on its opening day alone (January 4) in China, according to Deadline, as 1.7 million people in the country saw the one-off episode. It grossed $5 million in the latter country, South Korea. It grossed a total of CN¥161.315 million in China, its largest territory by box office gross. On these successful ratings, BBC Worldwide's Sally de St Croix said, "Following on from a strong performance on BBC One, the show has now seen multi-million dollar success at the South Korean and Chinese box offices – an outstanding achievement for a British TV show." It grossed US$578,109 on its opening weekend in Japan. The special cinema showing has grossed an international total of $38,400,603.
