= A Scandal in Belgravia =

- Sherlock episode
- Episode no.: Series 2 Episode 1
- Directed by: Paul McGuigan
- Written by: Steven Moffat
- Based on: "A Scandal in Bohemia" by Arthur Conan Doyle
- Cinematography by: Fabian Wagner
- Editing by: Charlie Phillips
- Original air date: 1 January 2012
- Running time: 89 minutes

Guest appearances
- Lara Pulver as Irene Adler; Danny Webb as D.I. Carter; Andrew Havill as The Equerry; Todd Boyce as Neilson; Oona Chaplin as Jeanette; Nathan Harmer as Phil; Rosalind Halstead as Kate; Peter Pedrero as Archer; Luke Newberry as Young Police

Episode chronology
← Previous "The Great Game"	Next → "The Hounds of Baskerville"

"A Scandal in Belgravia" is the first episode of the second series of the BBC crime drama series Sherlock, which follows the modern-day adventures of Sherlock Holmes, and was first broadcast by BBC One on 1 January 2012. It was written by co-creator Steven Moffat, and directed by Paul McGuigan. The episode was based on "A Scandal in Bohemia", a short story by Sir Arthur Conan Doyle.

The episode depicts Sherlock Holmes' (Benedict Cumberbatch) confrontation with Irene Adler (Lara Pulver), a dominatrix who has compromising photographs taken with a female member of the royal family. The photographs are stored inside her mobile phone, along with other valuable information which makes her a target of various political factions. Sherlock spends much of the episode keeping the device out of enemy hands while trying to deduce its password. Besides referring to the Doyle short story, the episode title names Belgravia, a district of London adjacent to the grounds of Buckingham Palace.

After its broadcast on BBC One, the episode was given consolidated figures of 10.663 million viewers in the United Kingdom. Critical reactions toward the episode were largely positive, with reviewers praising the writing, acting and direction. The episode sparked controversy for showing the character of Irene Adler in the nude; carefully using camera angles to avoid exposing genitalia, pre-watershed. In addition, some criticised episode writer Steven Moffat's representation of Irene Adler.

== Plot ==
During a dangerous confrontation, Sherlock Holmes, John Watson and Jim Moriarty are interrupted by a call on Moriarty's phone. He withdraws and dismisses his snipers.

Sherlock becomes a celebrity after John blogs about their cases. One day, they are brought to meet Mycroft in Buckingham Palace. Mycroft reveals that dominatrix Irene Adler took compromising photographs of a female member of the royal family. The authority wants to retrieve Irene's smartphone, which contains those photographs. Sherlock and John try to get into Irene's home by deception, but she expects them. Irene meets Sherlock nude, leaving him unable to deduce anything about her. She tells him she does not intend to blackmail her client, but the photographs are her "protection".

John triggers the fire alarm, enabling Sherlock to find Irene's hidden safe. Suddenly several CIA operatives led by agent Neilson break into the house and demand that Sherlock open the safe. Sherlock solves the password, which triggers a trap that kills one agent and allows them to break free. Sherlock gets the phone first, but Irene injects him with a sedative, takes the phone, and escapes.

On Christmas Eve, Sherlock receives a package containing Irene's phone, which is password locked. Considering its importance to her, Sherlock thinks she is about to be killed. The police find a body with a mutilated face, which Sherlock identifies as Irene. On New Year's Eve, John is brought to Irene, who faked her death. She tells him she needs the phone back but refuses to let Sherlock know she is alive. However, Sherlock followed John and sees her. When he arrives back at Baker St., Sherlock finds Neilson's team holding Mrs. Hudson hostage, but he subdues Neilson and pushes him out of the window.

Months later, Irene appears at Baker St. and reveals that she is still being hunted. She asks Sherlock to decipher a code stolen from a member of the Ministry of Defence. Sherlock reveals it to be airline seat numbers and deduces it applies to a flight leaving Heathrow the next day. Irene secretly conveys this information to Moriarty, who taunts Mycroft that he now knows their plan.

A government official brings Sherlock to Heathrow. Mycroft confirms that the government planned to fly a plane full of corpses to avoid alerting terrorists that they knew the plane would be bombed, reminiscent of the Coventry myth. However, as Sherlock unwittingly helped Irene (and thus Moriarty) crack the code, the scheme failed. Irene appears and gives Mycroft a list of demands, including protection, in exchange for the contents of her phone. However, Sherlock deduces the phone password is "SHER", so the screen reads "I AM SHER-LOCKED". Without her leverage, Irene pleads for protection, but Sherlock and Mycroft turn her down.

Some months later, Mycroft gives John Irene's phone and tells him that – although he intends to tell Sherlock that she has entered a witness protection programme in America – Irene actually has been killed by terrorists. Up in their flat, Sherlock asks John for Irene's phone and says that her last text message to him was "Goodbye, Mr. Holmes," suggesting her death. After John leaves, a flashback shows that Sherlock was disguised as the executioner and rescued Irene.

== Sources and allusions ==
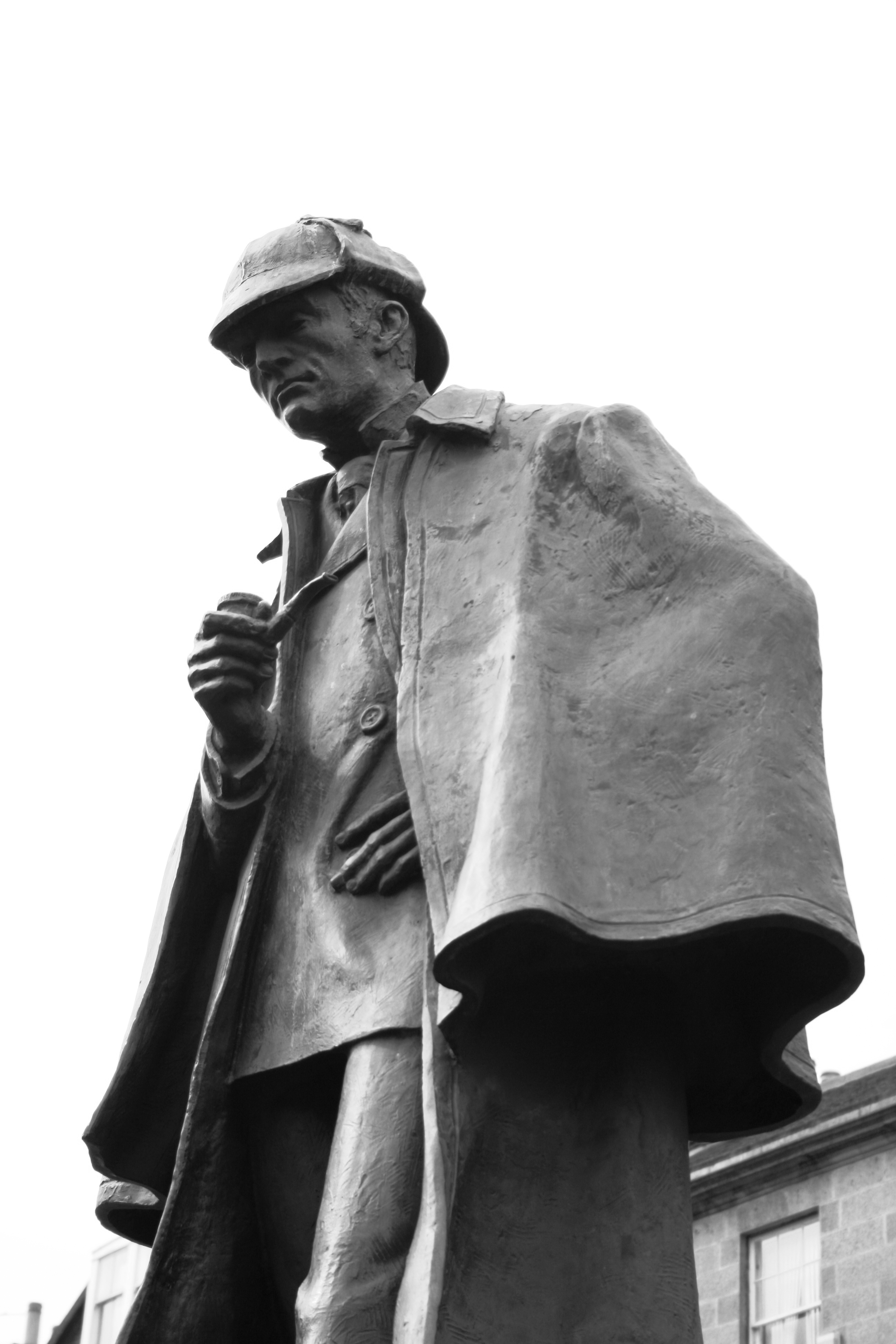
Statue of Sherlock Holmes in Edinburgh. "A Scandal in Belgravia" alludes to this 'classic' image of Holmes created by illustrator Sidney Paget.

The episode is based on Arthur Conan Doyle's short story "A Scandal in Bohemia", and also alludes to several other adventures. There are humorous references to numerous famous Holmes stories, such as "The Greek Interpreter" (in this episode, the "Geek Interpreter"), "The Speckled Band" (in the episode, the "Speckled Blonde"), "The Naval Treaty" (in the episode, "The Navel Treatment"), "The Illustrious Client" and "The Priory School". One of Watson's blogs is titled "Sherlock Holmes Baffled", the same title as a 1900 silent film, the first depiction of Holmes on film. Watson reveals his middle name to be Hamish, a nod to Dorothy Sayers' theory. Moriarty's text message to Mycroft of "Dear me, Mr. Holmes. Dear me," is the same as his note to Holmes in the epilogue of "The Valley of Fear". As Holmes opens Adler's safe, he says "Vatican cameos", a reference to a mystery that is mentioned in The Hound of the Baskervilles.

== Production ==
Lara Pulver decided to audition for the role of Irene Adler when she read the script shortly after wrapping on the espionage series Spooks, in which she had played Erin Watts. She was cast after meeting Steven Moffat and reading with Cumberbatch. Pulver told website Digital Spy that Moffat "had written such a multi-dimensional role that I literally immersed myself in his writing. Everything else went out the window for me, research-wise, other than [the dominatrix angle]. Literally, if you search my computer, you'd think I was a porn star or something!" She says that she found the initial vulnerability when filming the nude scenes "empowering" because she was unable to "hide behind anything – there's no mask. This is me, in the flesh! By the end of take two, it wasn't an issue."

Musician Eos Chater worked as Benedict Cumberbatch's violin coach for this episode. Although Chater's playing is on the actual soundtrack, Cumberbatch was required to appear to be an expert violinist. To achieve this, Chater was positioned on set so that she could synchronise her playing with his. She says, "On set I need to see him; to play when he lifts his violin and stop when he stops. And he needs to see me; to copy my bowings, to ghost what I'm doing. In one scene I have to stand outside on two boxes on a scissor lift, watching him while he watches me out of the window."

== Broadcast and reception ==
"A Scandal in Belgravia" was first broadcast on BBC One on Sunday, 1 January 2012. It received preliminary overnight figures of 8.75 million viewers, with a 30.9 per cent audience share. It is Sherlock's highest rated episode since the show's first episode, "A Study in Pink", which attracted 7.5 million. The episode won BBC One the timeslot, having drawn more viewers than Harry Potter and the Half-Blood Prince on ITV1. When consolidated final ratings are factored in, the episode saw an increase of almost two million viewers, totalling 10.663 million viewers, making it the fifth most viewed programme for the week. "A Scandal in Belgravia" also saw significant viewings on the catch-up internet television service BBC iPlayer, with more than 800,000 seeing the episode within 24 hours after its original broadcast, eventually becoming the most-watched programme of 2012 in May with over 2.5 million requests. The episode was later repeated on the digital channel BBC Three on Saturday, 7 January 2012 from 7 pm, which did not censor the nude scenes despite being shown pre-watershed. The repeat was seen by 883,000 viewers.

The British Board of Film Classification has awarded the episode a 12 certificate for "moderate sex references, violence and threat". The episode, which is accompanied by an audio commentary by Cumberbatch, Moffat, Gatiss, Pulver and Vertue, was released with the remainder of the second series in the UK on DVD and Blu-ray on 23 January 2012.

In the United States, the episode premiered on the Public Broadcasting Service (PBS) on 6 May 2012 as part of Masterpiece Mystery!. It was seen live by 3.2 million viewers, and was considered a success by the service as it doubled their average primetime ratings.

=== Critical reception ===
Critical reaction to the episode was largely positive. The Independent's Neela Debnath observed a "constant stream of comedy that ran alongside the suspense", while Tom Sutcliffe, also for The Independent, commends Moffat's "real poignancy" and how "barely a minute passes without a line that's worth making a note of". Sutcliffe continues to praise "lovely performances and great writing", and that "the whole thing is filmed with such invention".

Sarah Crompton, for The Telegraph, asserts that "Cumberbatch is utterly credible as a man who lives entirely in his cerebellum with little regard for the world outside, make Sherlock the perfect depiction of Holmes for our times". Radio Times writer David Brown agreed, stating that adaptation has the "heartbeat of Conan Doyle's original". Crompton further argues that the frequent allusions to the Holmes canon shows how Sherlock "revels in its own cleverness". Chris Harvey, also for The Telegraph, wrote, "We'll be lucky if there's a drama that's as much fun all year, so explaining that it was good, seems somehow superfluous". The Guardian's Sam Wollaston says that Conan Doyle's original story has "been Moffatised as well as modernised. He starts off parallel but then wanders off left and right, into international terrorism and CIA plots and complicated conspiracy theories. It's very complicated, I find at times." Wollaston later called it "a bit of a confusing mish-mash". In its otherwise positive review, Digital Spy's Morgan Jeffery suggests that "the resolution to the 'Scandal' case is perhaps a little too far-fetched".

=== Controversy ===
Following the episode's broadcast, the tabloid Daily Mail reported that Irene Adler's nude scene early in the episode had been met with disapproval from some viewers; The Guardian claimed that there was "no mystery about the Mail's reaction", observing that the paper was "so outraged by the scenes" that it illustrated its story "with a big blow-up picture on page 9". Following the broadcast, a BBC spokesman said: "We're delighted with the critical and audience response to the first episode, which has been extremely positive, and have received no complaints at this stage." As of 4 January 2012, the BBC had received 102 complaints "relating to inappropriate scenes broadcast before the Watershed", although "it could not tell when the complaints had been made, or how many came before and after the Daily Mail story". The regulator Ofcom also received 20 complaints about the episode, but decided it did not warrant investigation.

Jane Clare Jones, a doctoral student of feminist ethics writing in her blog on The Guardian's website, criticised episode writer Steven Moffat's representation of Irene Adler, arguing that her sexualisation was a regressive step. She writes, "While Conan Doyle's original is hardly an exemplar of gender evolution, you've got to worry when a woman comes off worse in 2012 than in 1891." Jones argues that while Conan Doyle's Adler was a "proto-feminist", Moffat undermined "her acumen and agency ... Not-so-subtly channelling the spirit of the predatory femme fatal [sic], Adler's power became, in Moffat's hands, less a matter of brains, and more a matter of knowing 'what men like' and how to give it to them ... Her masterminding of a cunning criminal plan was, it was revealed late in the day, not her own doing, but dependent on the advice of Holmes's arch nemesis, James Moriarty." However, Laura Pledger of Radio Times listed Adler as a strong female television character, writing, "Not since Scarlett O'Hara has a woman employed quite so many feminine wiles in pursuit of her ultimate goal – and with such chutzpah it feels churlish to criticise." Moffat rejected any suggestion that he or Conan Doyle's creation harboured sexist views, labelling the allegation "deeply offensive", and misguided in that the critics had assumed that he was "presenting the characters as the way it is and the way it ought to be". But, he says, both Adler and Sherlock "are clearly defined as deranged – it's love among the mad. He's a psychopath, so is she." In another interview with WalesOnline, Moffat says:

I think it's one thing to criticise a programme and another thing to invent motives out of amateur psychology for the writer and then accuse him of having those feelings. I think that was beyond the pale and strayed from criticism to a defamation act. I'm certainly not a sexist, a misogynist and it was wrong. It's not true and in terms of the character Sherlock Holmes, it is interesting. He has been referred to as being a bit misogynist. He's not; the fact is one of the lovely threads of the original Sherlock Holmes is whatever he says, he cannot abide anyone being cruel to women – he actually becomes incensed and full of rage.

Moffat later stated a reason that he did not feature more bisexuality to the character of Adler, "We don’t acknowledge you on television 'cos you’re having FAR TOO MUCH FUN. You probably don’t even watch 'cos you’re so BUSY!" His statement was criticised by some as a prejudiced comment.

=== Accolades ===
In May 2012, the episode won three British Academy Television Craft Awards. Moffat was awarded the Best Writer category for his work on the episode. In the meantime, Charlie Phillips was awarded in Editing: Fiction and the sound team (John Mooney, Jeremy Child, Howard Bargroff, Doug Sinclair) won Sound: Fiction. The episode managed to win all three Craft categories it was nominated for. The episode was nominated for 13 Primetime Emmy Awards, including Outstanding Miniseries or Movie. Benedict Cumberbatch was nominated for Outstanding Lead Actor in a Miniseries or Movie for his portrayal of Sherlock and Martin Freeman was nominated for Outstanding Supporting Actor in a Miniseries or Movie for his portrayal of Watson. Moffat and Paul MacGuigan were also nominated for their writing and directing respectively. In May 2013, the episode won the Edgar Award for Best Episode in a TV Series.
