= The Great Game (Sherlock) =

- Sherlock episode
- Episode no.: Series 1 Episode 3
- Directed by: Paul McGuigan
- Written by: Mark Gatiss
- Editing by: Mali Evans; Charlie Phillips
- Original air date: 8 August 2010
- Running time: 89 minutes

Guest appearances
- Mark Gatiss as Mycroft Holmes; Louise Brealey as Molly Hooper; Andrew Scott as Jim Moriarty; Vinette Robinson as Sgt Sally Donovan; Zoe Telford as Sarah Sawyer; Di Botcher as Connie Prince; John Sessions as Kenny Prince; John Lebar as Golem; Peter Davison as Planetarium Voice (uncredited)

Episode chronology
← Previous "The Blind Banker"	Next → "A Scandal in Belgravia"

"The Great Game" is the third and final episode of the first series of the television series Sherlock. It was first broadcast on BBC One and BBC HD on 8 August 2010. It was written by Mark Gatiss and directed by Paul McGuigan.

The episode follows Sherlock Holmes (Benedict Cumberbatch) and John Watson (Martin Freeman) as they race to solve a series of seemingly unrelated cases presented by a mysterious bomber. If they fail to solve the case in the time specified by the bomber, he will kill the hostage he is holding. After four such cases, the episode ends in a standoff between Holmes and the bomber, who it turns out is Jim Moriarty, the "consulting criminal" and the main antagonist for the rest of the series. The standoff is left as a cliffhanger until Season 2. Like its predecessors, the episode features numerous references to the works of Arthur Conan Doyle.

Critical reception of "The Great Game" was highly positive, being praised for its complex and gripping plot, and its unusual and original portrayal of Moriarty.

== Plot ==
Sherlock Holmes is bored without stimulating cases. Mycroft Holmes urges Sherlock to investigate the death of Secret Intelligence Service clerk Andrew West and the disappearance of a flash drive containing missile plans. Sherlock refuses and then is called to Scotland Yard where Lestrade hands him an envelope containing a mobile phone identical to the victim's phone from "A Study in Pink". The phone shows a photo of a derelict room, which Sherlock recognises as the unoccupied flat 221c, downstairs from 221b. Sherlock, Watson and Lestrade enter the room and find a pair of trainers in the middle of the floor. The mobile rings, and the caller – a frightened hostage reading texts from her captor – states that if Sherlock cannot solve the puzzle in twelve hours, a bomb will kill her. After closely examining the shoes, Sherlock realises they belonged to Carl Powers, a schoolboy who drowned in a swimming pool 20 years previously. Evidence on the laces indicates that botulinum toxin was introduced into the boy's eczema medication, leading to his paralysis. Sherlock announces the solution to the bomber, and the hostage is freed.

A second message shows a blood-stained sports car, and another hostage phones, giving Sherlock eight hours to solve this mystery. Finding the vehicle without its driver, Sherlock interviews the missing man's wife and the manager of the agency where the car had been rented. After finding that the blood in the car had been frozen, Sherlock announces that the missing man paid the rental agency owner to help him disappear, and the hostage is freed. A third message and hostage point Sherlock to the recent death of TV presenter Connie Prince, who allegedly died from tetanus. Watson interviews Prince's brother Kenny, and Sherlock shows that housekeeper Raoul de Santos — Kenny's lover — murdered Connie by increasing the dosage of her botox injection. Despite Sherlock solving the puzzle, the hostage is killed, along with several others, for describing the kidnapper's voice.

The fourth message is a photograph of the River Thames, but no hostage calls. Sherlock and the police discover security guard Alex Woodbridge's body on the riverbank. Sherlock claims that Woodbridge was strangled by an assassin called the "Golem". He also deduces that Woodbridge worked at a local art gallery that is preparing to display an allegedly "lost" Johannes Vermeer painting. Watson visits Woodbridge's flat and finds he was interested in astronomy but not art and that a recent message on his answering machine from a professor stated that he'd been right about something. Sherlock deduces that the Vermeer painting is a forgery and that Woodbridge's discovery of it was why he was killed. The hostage calls and Sherlock gives his answer, but the hostage, a child, begins counting down. Realizing he must prove his deduction, Sherlock spots a supernova in the painting that actually appeared 200 years after Vermeer, thus saving the child. The museum curator confesses setting up the forgery and outs her accomplice: a man named "Moriarty".

At Mycroft's insistence, Watson investigates West's death, and he and Sherlock track down Joe Harrison, the brother of West's fiancée, who admits to stealing the flash drive and accidentally killing West when he was confronted. Unable to sell it, Harrison kept the drive and gives it to Sherlock. Realizing that West's death and the missing flash drive were the fifth mystery, Sherlock texts the bomber, offering to turn over the device. But at the meeting place, it is Watson who arrives as the fifth hostage, wearing an explosive vest. Moriarty – who'd been seen earlier as Molly's new boyfriend Jim – appears and introduces himself as "a specialist, just like you." After taunting and threatening Sherlock, Moriarty leaves but returns after Sherlock removes Watson's vest. With multiple snipers aiming at Sherlock and Watson. Sherlock aims his handgun at the explosive vest, threatening mutual assured destruction.

== Sources and allusions ==
As with all episodes of Sherlock, the plot combines those of a number of works by Sir Arthur Conan Doyle.

- Sherlock's surprising ignorance, discussed on John's blog, about several commonplace subjects including astronomy, comes from A Study in Scarlet, as does Holmes' annoyance about ordinary people filling their minds with useless subjects.
- Andrew West, the name of the MI6 clerk, comes from "The Adventure of the Bruce-Partington Plans".
- The episode made reference to "The Five Orange Pips", being sent by an assassin organization as a warning. In the episode, these pips were five electronic beeps, like the pips (the time signal) broadcast on the hour by the BBC's analogue radio stations.

== Production ==
According to the DVD commentary, "The Great Game" was the first episode of Sherlock to be produced after the BBC accepted the series. The series was filmed in reverse order because co-creator Steven Moffat, the writer of the first episode "A Study in Pink", was busy with the fifth series of Doctor Who.

Andrew Scott made his first appearance as Jim Moriarty in "The Great Game". Moffat said, "We knew what we wanted to do with Moriarty from the very beginning. Moriarty is usually a rather dull, rather posh villain so we thought someone who was genuinely properly frightening. Someone who's an absolute psycho." Moffat and Gatiss were originally not going to put a confrontation between Moriarty and Sherlock into the first three episodes, but realised that they "just had to do a confrontation scene. We had to do a version of the scene in 'The Final Problem' in which the two arch-enemies meet each other."

Sherlock's residence at 221B Baker Street was filmed at 185 North Gower Street. Baker Street was impractical because of heavy traffic and the number of things labelled "Sherlock Holmes", which would need to be disguised. The laboratory used by Sherlock was filmed at Cardiff University School of Earth and Ocean Sciences.

"The Great Game" was partly set in a disused sewage works.

== Broadcast and reception ==
"The Great Game" was first broadcast on BBC One on 8 August 2010. Overnight figures had been watched by 7.34 million viewers on BBC One and BBC HD, a 31.3% audience share. Final viewing figures rose to 9.18 million.

Critical reception was highly positive. Chris Tilly of IGN rated "The Great Game" a 9.5 out of 10, describing it as "gripping from start to finish". Of Moriarty's appearance, he said it "didn't disappoint either, the villain of the piece being unlike any incarnation of the character yet seen on screen". He also praised the writing, saying, "Credit should go to writer Mark Gatiss, his script the perfect combination of classic Conan Doyle storytelling with modern-day plot devices and humour, creating a sophisticated mystery that was the perfect marriage of old and new.", and the performances of Cumberbatch and Freeman. John Teti, writing for The A.V. Club, awarded the episode an A− and called it an "extraordinarily dense 90 minutes". He further singled out Andrew Scott for praise, writing that his "portrayal of Moriarty is a thrilling departure from earlier incarnations of the man". The Guardian's Sam Wollaston was optimistic for the programme, describing it as "smart, exciting, and just the right level of confusing" and described "The Great Game" as "a mash-up that totally works" and "an edge-of-the seat ride".
