= Traherne =

Traherne, Trahern, or Treherne is a Welsh surname, and may refer to:

- Cennydd Traherne (1910–1995), Welsh landowner
- John Treherne (1929–1989), English entomologist
- John Montgomery Traherne (1788–1860), Welsh Anglican priest and antiquarian
- Llewelyn Traherne (1766–1842), Welsh magistrate, High Sheriff of Glamorgan in 1801
- Margaret Traherne (1919–2006), British artist
- Philip Traherne (1635–1686), English diplomat and author
- Thomas Traherne (c. 1636 – 1674), English poet and religious writer
- Thomas Trahern (officer of arms) (died 1542), English officer-of-arms, Somerset Herald

== See also ==
- Traherne Island, one of two islands contained within the Motu Manawa (Pollen Island) Marine Reserve
- Treherne (disambiguation)
