= The Hounds of Baskerville =

- Sherlock episode
- One of the titular hounds whose creation was the largest visual effect made by the series at that point.
- Episode no.: Series 2 Episode 2
- Directed by: Paul McGuigan
- Written by: Mark Gatiss
- Based on: The Hound of the Baskervilles by Arthur Conan Doyle
- Cinematography by: Fabian Wagner
- Editing by: Charlie Phillips
- Original air date: 8 January 2012
- Running time: 88 minutes

Guest appearances
- Russell Tovey as Henry Knight; Amelia Bullmore as Dr Stapleton; Clive Mantle as Dr Bob Frankland; Simon Paisley Day as Major Barrymore; Sasha Behar as Dr Louise Mortimer; Will Sharpe as Corporal Lyons; Stephen Wight as Fletcher; Gordon Kennedy as Gary; Kevin Trainor as Billy; Rosalind Knight as Grace; Sam Jones as Young Henry; Chipo Chung as Presenter

Episode chronology
← Previous "A Scandal in Belgravia"	Next → "The Reichenbach Fall"

"The Hounds of Baskerville" is the second episode of the second series of the BBC crime drama series Sherlock, which follows the modern-day adventures of Sherlock Holmes, and was first broadcast by BBC One on 8 January 2012. It was written by co-creator Mark Gatiss, who also portrays Mycroft Holmes, Sherlock's brother in the series, and was directed by Paul McGuigan. The episode is a contemporary adaptation of The Hound of the Baskervilles, one of Sir Arthur Conan Doyle's most famous works.

In the episode, Sherlock (Benedict Cumberbatch) and his crime-solving partner John Watson (Martin Freeman) take on the case of Henry Knight (Russell Tovey), who 20 years earlier witnessed the brutal killing of his father by a "gigantic hound" on Dartmoor. The investigation leads the pair to Baskerville, a military research base.

Because of the popularity of the novel, Gatiss felt a greater responsibility to include familiar elements of the story than he did when adapting the lesser-known stories. The script was intended to follow elements of the horror genre and make the episode scary. As opposed to traditional ghost stories, Gatiss's plot focused on more contemporary horrors, conspiracy theories and genetic modification. Filming was done throughout May 2011, with additional shots taking place as late as August. Location shooting took place mostly across South Wales, though parts were shot in Dartmoor. The hound was created using visual effects.

After its broadcast on BBC One, the episode received consolidated figures of 10.266 million viewers in the United Kingdom. This rating, although a slight drop from the previous episode, still represented the second largest audience in British television the week it aired. Critical reaction toward the episode was largely positive, with reviewers praising both the modernisation and its tonal fidelity to the original. Critics praised Cumberbatch, Freeman, and Tovey, as well as Sherlock's "mind palace" sequence.

== Plot ==
Sherlock and John receive a visit from Henry Knight, who witnessed his father's being killed by a "gigantic hound" on Dartmoor 20 years ago. After years of therapy, Henry revisited the site, only to see the hound's footprints, prompting his request for help. Though initially dismissive, Sherlock is soon intrigued by Henry's use of "hound" instead of "dog". Sherlock and John arrive on Dartmoor to find that the hound is a local legend. They visit Baskerville, a nearby Ministry of Defence research base, using Mycroft's security pass. After Mycroft's credentials cause a security alert, Dr. Bob Frankland vouches for Sherlock's identity, despite knowing the truth. Frankland says he was a friend of Henry's father and is concerned for Henry's well-being.

Henry tells John and Sherlock about the words "liberty" and "in" in his dreams. Sherlock, John, and Henry then visit the hollow in the hope of finding the hound. On the way, John hangs back to observe what seems to be Morse code signals but these prove to be unrelated to the case. When he catches up to Sherlock and Henry, Henry says that he has just seen the hound in the thick fog and that Sherlock must have seen it, too, which Sherlock denies. Later, at a local inn, Sherlock is visibly shaken and confesses he did see the hound. John tries calming him, suggesting he imagined it, but Sherlock reacts with anger, denying there is anything wrong with him. John leaves him alone and tries to pump Henry's therapist, Louise Mortimer, for information, under the guise of chatting her up. However, they are interrupted by Frankland, who blows his cover. Meanwhile, Henry hallucinates that the hound is stalking his home.

The next morning Sherlock theorizes that "hound" may be an acronym rather than a word. The pair run into DI Lestrade who was sent by Mycroft to keep an eye on Sherlock. They interrogate the innkeepers about a past order for meat that John spotted, which struck him as odd for a vegetarian restaurant. The innkeepers admit keeping a dog on the moor to boost the tourist trade, but pretend to the investigators that it had been put down. This explanation satisfies Lestrade but not Sherlock, who insists that the dog he saw was monstrous.

Calling Mycroft, Sherlock gains access to Baskerville again. Searching the lower levels of the genetics labs alone, John finds himself trapped and then hears growling, which he assumes is the hound. Locking himself in an empty cage, he calls Sherlock, who rescues him. Sherlock deduces that a chemical weapon designed to trigger violent hallucinations was responsible. Retreating into his "mind palace", a memory technique, Sherlock realises that "liberty" and "in" stand for Liberty, Indiana. After viewing confidential files, he learns that "H.O.U.N.D." was a secret C.I.A. project aimed at creating a hallucinatory anti-personnel chemical weapon. Although the project was abandoned several years before, Sherlock realises Frankland, who participated in the project, has continued it secretly.

After John receives a call from Mortimer warning that Henry has run off with a gun, John, Sherlock, and Lestrade run to the hollow to find Henry about to commit suicide. Sherlock explains that the hound was a hallucination; his father had been killed by Frankland, wearing a gas mask and a sweatshirt with "H.O.U.N.D. Liberty, IN" on it. A child could not cope with this, so his mind tricked him. Every time Henry came back, Frankland gassed him with the hallucinogen. The fog in the hollow is actually the chemical agent, triggered by pressure pads in the area. As Henry calms down, they all fall under the influence of the gas and see a savage dog preparing to attack them, and John shoots it. Frankland appears at the scene, and Sherlock briefly hallucinates that he is Moriarty, before giving chase. Henry realises that his father had been murdered because he found Frankland testing the drug. He attacks Frankland, who flees into the base's minefield and is blown up.

As Sherlock and John prepare to leave the following day, John wonders why he saw the hound in the laboratory despite not having inhaled the gas from the hollow. Sherlock surmises that the leaking pipes poisoned John in the laboratory. John realises that Sherlock locked him in the labs to test his theory. He also points out that Sherlock was wrong for once; he'd believed the drug was in Henry's sugar and had surreptitiously put it in John's coffee.

In the closing scenes, Mycroft oversees the release of Moriarty from a holding cell, which has "Sherlock" written all over the walls.

== Sources and allusions ==
The story is based on Arthur Conan Doyle's novel The Hound of the Baskervilles, and also contains plot devices and lines from other Doyle stories:

- The hallucinogenic gas comes from "The Adventure of the Devil's Foot".
- Holmes' bloodsoaked appearance with a harpoon comes from "The Adventure of Black Peter".
- Holmes' stated preference for something stronger than tea, perhaps "seven per cent stronger", is a reference to his use of a seven per cent cocaine solution described in The Sign of the Four.
- The scene wherein Holmes claims to have made a bet with Watson comes from a similar scene in "The Adventure of the Blue Carbuncle." The episode also introduces the popular catchphrase, "Once you've ruled out the impossible, whatever remains, however improbable, must be true", from several stories. The copy of The Racing Post, in the man's pocket is a clear allusion to the 'Pink 'un' from the original story's "When you see a man with whiskers of that cut and the 'Pink 'un' protruding out of his pocket, you can always draw him by a bet"
- Sherlock calls Lestrade "brown as a nut", a phrase taken word-for-word from a different conversation in A Study in Scarlet.

== Production ==
=== Casting ===
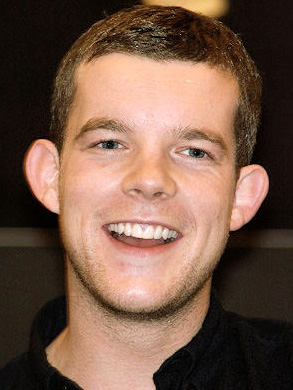
Russell Tovey appeared in the episode as Henry Knight.

In June 2011, it was announced that Russell Tovey would appear in Sherlock series two in its second episode. Tovey, who liked Sherlock for staying true to the style of the novels despite its modern twist, said of the experience: "It's amazing to be a part of it", adding, "I got to act with Benedict and Martin which was awesome". The actor also explained that during his scenes, "We did about two and a half weeks of night shoots in Cardiff and I felt like I had jetlag." In terms of Henry's character, Tovey did not want him to be a "jibbering wreck", but rather mature and truthful as well as damaged and haunted. Gatiss also made Henry display signs of survivor guilt. Tovey's nephew auditioned for the part of a younger Henry, but another child actor was cast for the role as the nephew was considered too young.

=== Background and writing ===
"For ["The Hounds of Baskerville"], I wanted to make it as scary as possible, and for it to be a proper horror story. But what didn't feel right was making it a haunted house story. So I realised that the thing we're most afraid of nowadays is faceless government and conspiracy theories ... and they're almost the modern equivalent of ghost stories. And the great thing is, you can have all the tropes of a ghost story. So rather than Baskerville being a big spooky house, it's a facility ... with dark rumours about the 'things' they're breeding there."

— Mark Gatiss, on writing the horror tone of "The Hounds of Baskerville"

The episode was based on The Hound of the Baskervilles, first serialised in 1901–1902; it is considered one of Arthur Conan Doyle's most famous Holmes stories, as it was written after Doyle killed off Sherlock and, consequently, sold well. It was also one of the most adapted novels in the Sherlock Holmes series. Because of its popularity, writer Mark Gatiss felt a greater responsibility to include familiar elements of the story than he did when adapting the lesser-known stories. Conan Doyle had killed off his famous character in the 1893 story "The Final Problem", but bowed to popular pressure to write another Holmes adventure. Gatiss observed that Conan Doyle's weariness with the character is demonstrated by Holmes' absence for half of The Hound of the Baskervilles, in which Doctor Watson's role is foregrounded.

In contrast to the original, however, the producers decided to centre Sherlock in their adaptation, so Sherlock only threatens to stay behind in London. In addition, the three episodes of the second series show Sherlock dealing, respectively, with love, fear, and death. Here, the producers wanted Sherlock, an arch-rationalist, to confront something that seemed impossible, especially since their Sherlock is still a young character who has not experienced fear yet. Freeman stated that when he sees the hound, Sherlock becomes "really terrified" and for some time, stops trusting the evidence he has seen.

The producers also considered how to make the dog believable because, according to Gatiss, audiences always find the dog disappointing in the adaptations. Therefore, Gatiss wanted the solution to be more than a "dog with luminous paint". In one scene, Henry has an hallucination in his home, wherein the hound sets off the bright security lights in his back garden. That scene is apparently based on the experience of co-creator Steven Moffat and his executive producer and wife Sue Vertue, who also have bright security lights and are frequently startled whenever the lights turn on at night.

There were other differences from the novel. Henry Knight was based on Sir Henry Baskerville, but the character Barrymore, a butler in the book, became an Army major. Another character, Fletcher, was original to the episode; the character was based on Bertram Fletcher Robinson, the journalist who assisted Doyle with the novel. In another scene, John notices what appears to be Morse code, but it is unrelated to the case. Moffat named it the funniest instance where the producers take an element from Doyle's works and "do something cheeky with it". The Baskerville base was based on Porton Down military science research centre. While conducting research for the episode, Gatiss learned that artists and scientists made a luminous rabbit, using the green fluorescent protein of a jellyfish, which formed the basis for a side story involving a "glow-in-the-dark" rabbit created at Baskerville by Dr. Stapleton, the mother of the child who wrote to Sherlock at the beginning of the episode requesting that he help her find her missing rabbit. In the episode, it is specified that the spliced-in "GFP gene" that had allowed the rabbit to glow had come from a jellyfish of the species Aequorea victoria. Also, Gatiss suggested the concept of a "mind palace", a memory technique originating in Ancient Greece; the idea came from a book by illusionist Derren Brown. This technique would lead Sherlock to the revelation of the secret H.O.U.N.D. project.

Early script drafts had Henry accidentally kill Louise Mortimer, but producers were never satisfied with this development, thinking Henry would have failed if she died. Writers also posited that Henry's father's murder involved revenge after he had an affair, but the producers and Gatiss found it easier to mention he died because he learned of Frankland's experiments with the hallucinogenic gas. The ending also changed; the final scene had originally involved Moriarty entering the Tower of London but that was held back for the following episode.

=== Filming and effects ===
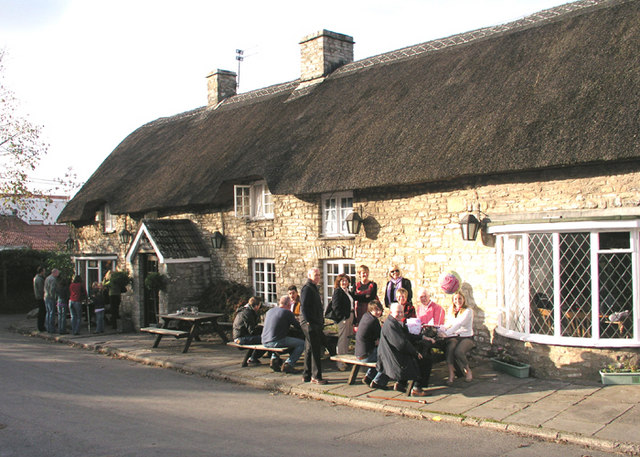
The Bush Inn in St Hilary, Vale of Glamorgan, doubled as the Cross Keys pub in Dartmoor.

"The Hounds of Baskerville" took around four weeks to film, with shooting mostly taking place throughout May 2011. Additional scenes were shot later in July and August. Filming on location mostly took place across South Wales, with parts of the episode being shot on location in Dartmoor, even though the producers did not originally intend to do so. The first day took place at a cemetery. The producers were looking for a village in South Wales that was "very English-looking." Scenes of the fictional "Cross Keys" pub were filmed at the Bush Inn in St Hilary, Vale of Glamorgan. The production team donated £500 to the village after filming had finished. In one scene, after Sherlock first witnesses the hound, Sherlock makes deductions about a mother and son from a nearby table. In filming the scene, Cumberbatch has to recall multiple pages of monologue in front of camera, and had to talk faster than he was used to.

The scenes at Baskerville were filmed at a number of locations. The exterior was filmed at the gas works by Baverstocks near Llwydcoed in Mid Glamorgan. The labs meanwhile were filmed in two separate locations, one of which was a microchip processing facility. The switch between two locations meant that the crew had to transport a lift set. The scenes in Dewer's Hollow, where the hound was sighted, was filmed near Castell Coch. The reveal scenes in the hollow took two nights to film. At some point filming the scenes were delayed due to rain. The scenes shot in Dartmoor took place in areas such as Haytor and Hound Tor, the latter of which was said to be where the original story was set.

Throughout his scenes, Rupert Graves was tanned because before filming the episode, the actor was in Guadeloupe, an island on the Caribbean, appearing in Death in Paradise. As a result, Gatiss added mention that Lestrade went on holiday in the script. In the original episode, John was to hallucinate the hound at a meat storage locker. However, after visiting such a locker in Bristol, the producers came to realise that it would be too expensive, and cold for Freeman, forcing them to change the setting to the Baskerville labs. In one scene, Sherlock is driving a Land Rover with John as a passenger after their arrival at Dartmoor; John was originally going to be the one driving the car, however Freeman cannot drive. In the client scenes, Tovey had to smoke a herbal cigarette as it was illegal to smoke real cigarettes on set. Throughout the episode, the production crew used split dioptres in certain scenes, a camera technique where two separate camera angles are at the same focus on screen. The episode also includes shots of the hound, which was produced by visual effects. Although the series used computer-generated imagery (CGI) in the past, it was the first time a visual effect was made on a large scale. However, there was no guide for the cast to interact with.

== Broadcast and reception ==
"The Hounds of Baskerville" was first broadcast on BBC One on Sunday, 8 January 2012 between 8:30 p.m. and 10:00 p.m. It received preliminary overnight figures of 8.16 million viewers with a 29 per cent audience share. It was down by almost 400,000 from the previous week, but it was still the most seen broadcast in its time slot, beating ITV1 drama Wild at Heart. When final ratings are factored, the episode saw an increase of more than two million viewers, totalling 10.266 million viewers, making it the second most viewed programme for the week. The episode was later repeated on the digital channel BBC Three on Saturday, 14 January 2012 from 7pm, and was seen by 710,000 viewers. It also became the third most-watched programme of 2012 on the online BBC iPlayer as of May, with over 1.6 million views.

The British Board of Film Classification awarded the episode a 12 certificate for "moderate threat and violence." The episode, which is accompanied by an audio commentary by Moffat, Gatiss, Tovey and Vertue, was released with the remainder of the second series in the UK on DVD and Blu-ray on 23 January 2012.

=== Critical reception ===
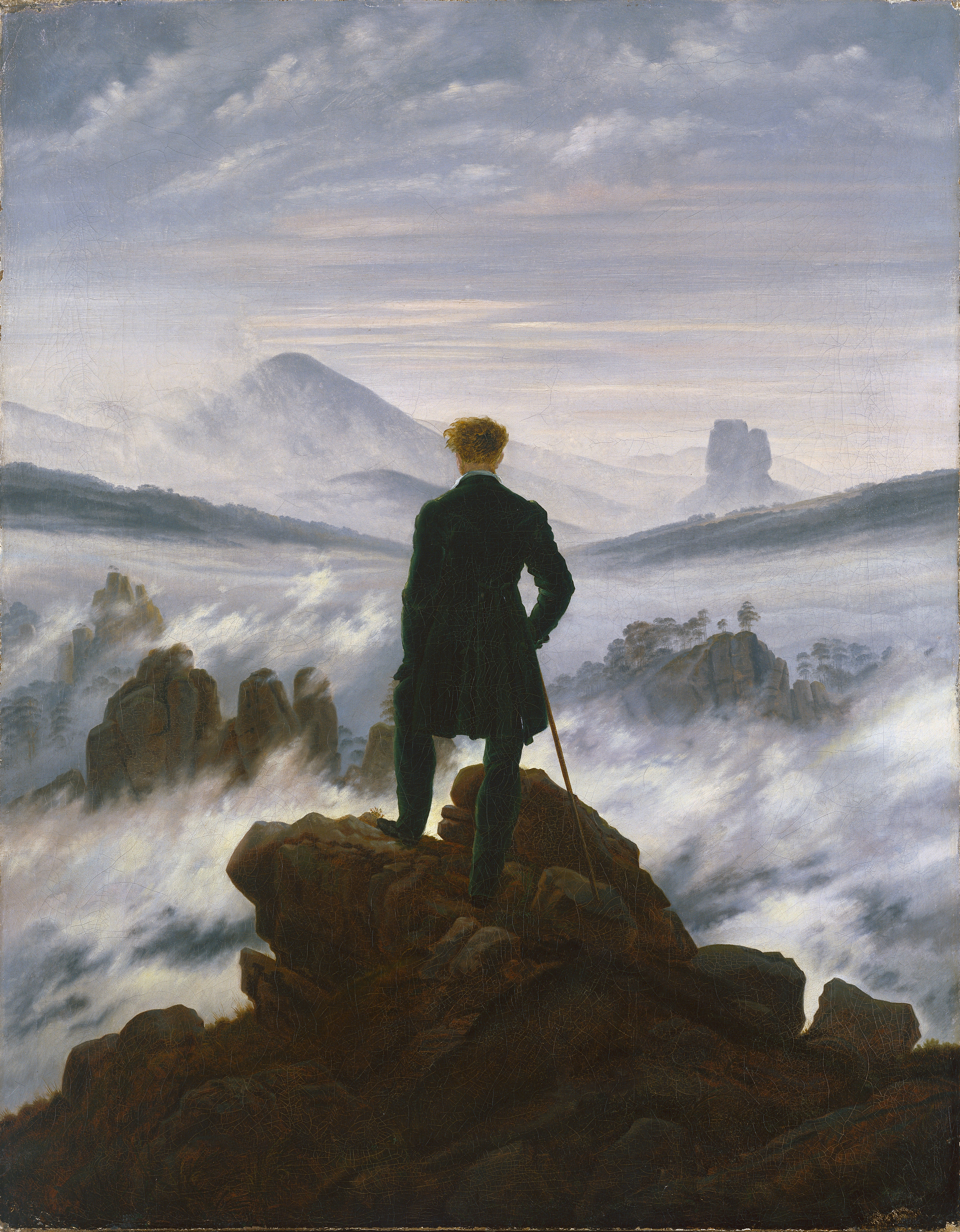
The scene in which Sherlock clambered to the top of a tor at Dartmoor reminded a critic of Caspar David Friedrich's painting Wanderer above the Sea of Fog.

Reviews of the episode were mostly positive. In a pre-broadcast review, Terry Ramsey of The Daily Telegraph labelled the story's shift from a Gothic house to a military research base "an inspired piece of modernisation". He praised the two lead actors, and say that "the script is sharp and witty and the updating is clever, while remaining true to the original. A modern classic." Serena Davies, also of The Daily Telegraph praised the episode for being "pacy, sharp and witty, as we've come to expect from the Moffat and Gatiss crack creative duo, and rather less inscrutable than the New Year episode." Davies rated the episode four out of five stars. Chris Harvey, again from The Daily Telegraph identified a range of clues, cultural references and possible inspirations. He suggests that the scene in which "Sherlock Holmes clambered alone to the top of a Dartmoor mound and surveyed the landscape below, it appeared to be a direct visual reference to ... Wanderer above the Sea of Fog" by 19th century German Romantic landscape painter Caspar David Friedrich. Harvey also identified several references to Thomas Harris' character Hannibal Lecter, plot similarities to the 2005 film Batman Begins, and jokes similar to Scooby-Doo.

Sam Wollaston, for The Guardian, favourably compared "The Hounds of Baskerville" to "A Scandal in Belgravia", writing that the episode "has a 21st-century pace to it, and fizzes with the wit we've come to expect from Sherlock ... [recapturing] the essence of The Hound of the Baskervilles ... like the original, it's properly creepy". The Radio Times's David Butcher compared the episode to Steven Moffat's series opener, "A Scandal in Belgravia", saying this "is more of a creepy affair, all jittery camerawork, paranoia and suspense." Christopher Hootan of Metro thought the episode was "the perfect marriage of misty, moor-based foreboding and modern, fast-paced thriller," adding that "with a breakneck script and captivating acting from Benedict Cumberbatch, Sherlock offers about the fastest hour and a half of television going at the moment."

"Tackling The Hound of the Baskervilles, Mark Gatiss faced a toughie. How do you make a functional modern mystery thriller from a story so familiar to so many? How do you thrill an audience who already knows whodunit? With adroit plotting, sneaky inversions, excellent grounding in source and genre, and a delicious sense of mischief comes Gatiss' answer in the form of The Hounds of Baskerville. Episode 2.2 serves up a psychological horror that gives good scare before revealing its supernatural hound to have a very real-world provenance."

— Louisa Mellor from Den of Geek

Louisa Mellor of Den of Geek believed the episode was "well-schooled" in the horror genre, "with plenty of freaking out and jumping at shadows. Arnold and Price's elegant music came to the fore wonderfully in the largely wordless scenes of Watson and Henry's fearful hallucinations." Mellor was also appreciative of McGuigan's "stylish hand" as director, particularly highlighting the "mind palace" sequence, as well as Tovey's performance as Henry Knight and for "once again" seeing Watson's role for being "more than just sigh exasperatedly at his flatmate and apologise to others on Sherlock's behalf." In summary, the reviewer stated "I can only echo Sherlock's own closing words to Henry: "This case, thank you, it's been brilliant"." Chris Tilly of IGN rated the episode a "good" 7 out of 10, but stated that although it was "full of mystery and intrigue," the central story "wasn't strong enough to fill the 90-minute run-time, running out of steam at the mid-way point and padded out with irrelevant and at times exasperating efforts to throw the audience off the scent." Tilly praised Cumberbatch's performance as a mentally broke down Holmes, and Freeman for being "let off the leash this week, with Watson investigating solo on a couple of occasions," and also thought Tovey was a "fine addition to the ensemble."

David Lewis of CultBox called it "a pretty straightforward thriller about chemical warfare, cover-ups and a colossal canine. It's also suspenseful, spooky and superb." The reviewer also commented on the hound's appearance: "It isn't [mutant], of course—just an evil-looking mutt hired by Gary and Billy to drum up business for their boozer—and happily, like all the previous hounds that have haunted Holmes in film and TV for nearly a hundred years, it looks gloriously rubbish when it finally appears." Lewis rated the episode four out of five stars. Morgan Jeffery of Digital Spy thought "The Hounds of Baskerville" was "an excellent installment of Sherlock — fun, moody and, at times, genuinely scary." Jeffery felt that the final realisation of the hound was impressive, and praised the CGI work, as well as the performance of Cumberbatch and Freeman.

However, some critics gave the episode mixed to negative reviews. Tom Ryan of WhatCulture rated the episode two and a half out of five stars, summing up the review with; "Given the popularity of the original book and the success thus far of the current TV series, it is safe to assume that last night's episode was perhaps the most eagerly anticipated installment of the show since its inception. Too bad then that it was so underwhelming." The Guardian writer Stuart Heritage stated; "Last night's Hounds of Baskervilles wasn't quite as rapturously received as other adventures, perhaps because of the amount of time that Cumberbatch and Freeman spent apart. The whole middle section, where Watson stormed off in a huff after being subjected to another one of Sherlock's baroque "that man is left-handed and also has dog hair on one of his socks" monologues, felt slow and flat precisely because there was none of the chemistry between the two leads that we've come to expect from Sherlock." Jim Shelley of the Daily Mirror stated that the episode was "a disappointment," contrasting it against the original book as "a tedious treatise against vivisection." However, Shelley stated that he enjoyed the "mind palace" scene.
