= Trahern (surname) =

Trahern is a surname. Notable people with the surname include:

- Dallas Trahern (born 1985), American baseball pitcher
- George Trahern (born 1936), American politician
- Thomas Trahern (died 1542), English officer of arms

== See also ==
- Traherne
