= Permaculture Association =

- Founded: 1983
- Type: Charity
- Purpose: Permaculture
- Location: Hollybush Conservation Centre, Broad Lane, Kirkstall, Leeds, UK
- Region served: United Kingdom
- Members: 1480
- Key people: Sonja Breuer: Chair, Andy Goldring: Chief Executive
- Employees: 21
- Website: www.permaculture.org.uk

The Permaculture Association is a registered charity that promotes the theory and practice of permaculture in Britain and worldwide.

The charity is based at offices in Kirkstall, Leeds, England, but connects a diverse network of individuals and projects, with over 1,400 members and over 100 demonstration sites. There are regional networks: Permaculture Scotland and Paramaethu Cymru.

== History ==
The Permaculture Association was established as a charity on 8 February 1983 and is registered in England and Scotland.

In Autumn 1982, a four-day introduction to permaculture course was run in Blencarn, by Max Lindegger of Permaculture Nambour (Australia).

== Activities ==
On 10 February 2009 Andy Goldring of the Permaculture Association addressed the Grow Sheffield AGM which was held in Sheffield.

The Permaculture Association offers its members a range of services including discounts for events, opportunities to network, promotion and support of projects and a telephone helpline. It "keeps a database listing hundreds of grassroots projects and educational organisations offering practical advice." It also certifies Permaculture Design Courses in the UK and runs a diploma in Applied Permaculture Design

The organisation was a partner in the Local Food consortium of the Big Lottery Fund's Changing Spaces programme.

The Permaculture Association also supports international projects such as the Permaculture Institute of El Salvador and the Himalayan Permaculture Institute.

The Permaculture Association hosted the International Permaculture Convergence (IPC), London 2015.

=== Current projects ===
Research. Permaculture International Research Network, Information For Action on Climate Change, Research Digest.

Events. The Permaculture Association will have a stall at the Oxford Real Farming Conference 2018. The national convergence will next take place in September 2018.

=== Convergences ===
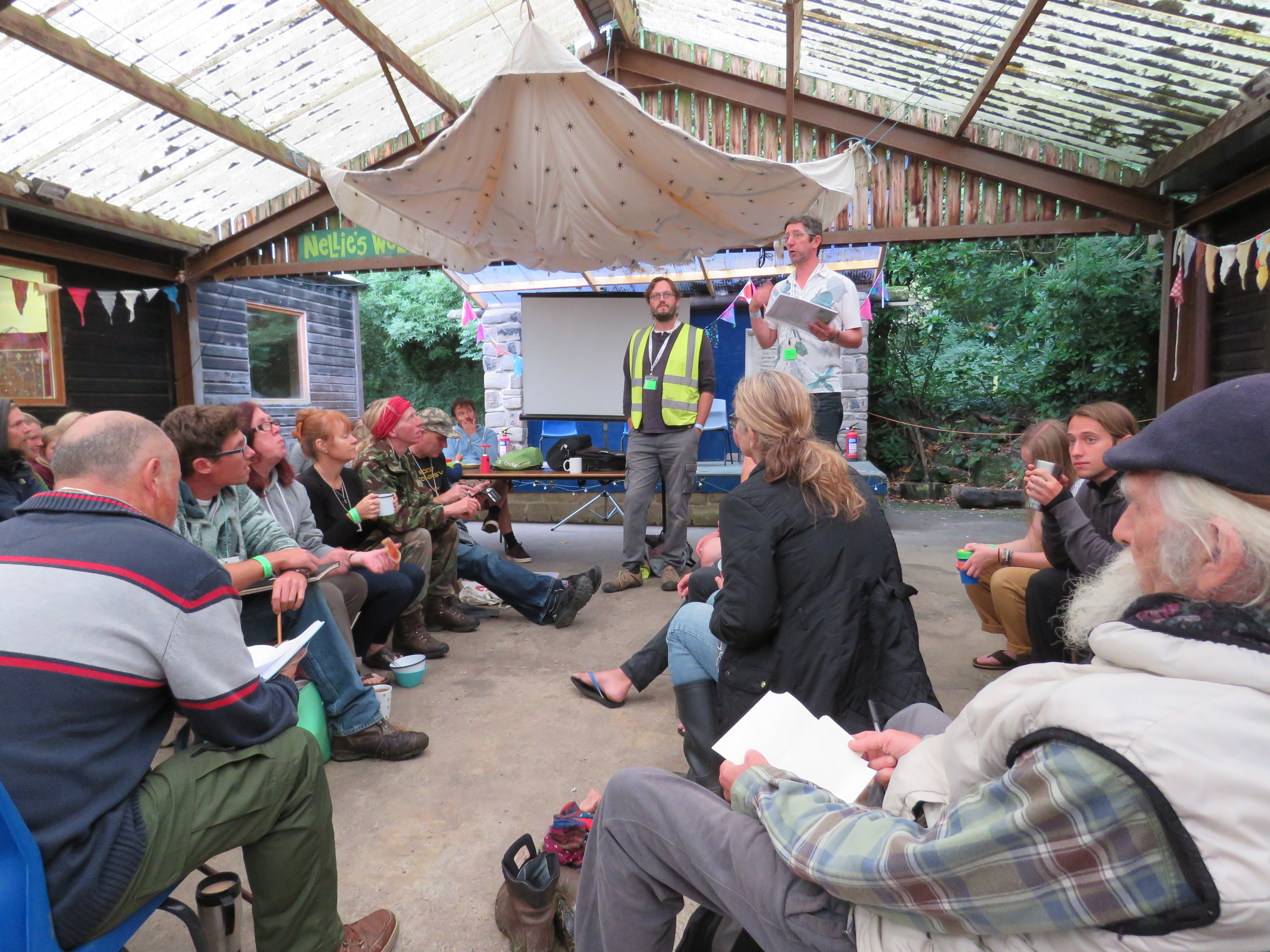

The Permaculture Association organises a biennial national gathering of members, known as a convergence.

Permaculture Scotland and Paramaethu Cymru have held gatherings of their own annually since 2014. Members also typically organise regional and more local gatherings.

British Convergences
Year	Location
2019	Hill End Activity Centre, Oxfordshire
2018	Manchester
2016	Nell Bank Centre, Ilkley, West Yorkshire
2014	Gilwell Park, Chingford, Essex
2012	Coed Hills, Glamorgan Wales
2010	Lambourne End, Lambourne, Essex
2008	Nell Bank Centre, Ilkley, West Yorkshire
2006	New Barn Field Centre, Dorchester, Dorset
2004	Braziers Park, Wallingford, Oxfordshire
2002	Easton Community Centre, Bristol
2001	East London
1997	Nell Bank Centre, Ilkley, Yorkshire
199?	Hill End Activity Centre, Oxfordshire
1982	Blencarn, Cumbria

== See also ==
- Permaculture
- Transition Towns
- Plants for a Future
- Rob Hopkins
- Patrick Whitefield
- Ecodemia
