= St Hilary, Vale of Glamorgan =

Village in the Vale of Glamorgan, Wales

Coordinates: 51.450°N 3.417°W

St Hilary: Welsh: Saint Hilari
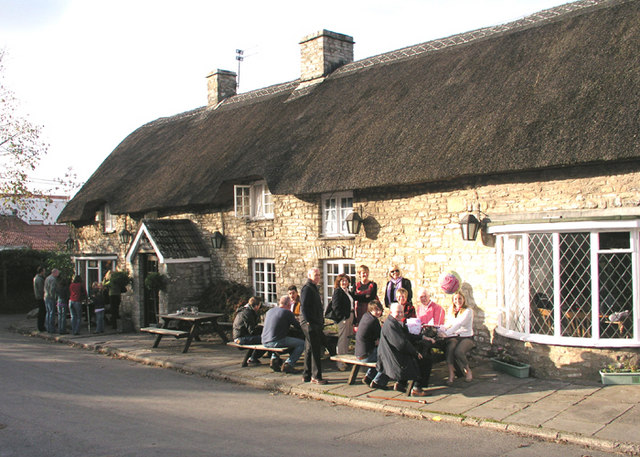
- The Bush Inn

- Location within the Vale of Glamorgan
- Principal area: Vale of Glamorgan
- Preserved county: South Glamorgan
- Country: Wales
- Sovereign state: United Kingdom
- Postcode district: CF
- Police: South Wales
- Fire: South Wales
- Ambulance: Welsh
- UK Parliament: Vale of Glamorgan
- Senedd Cymru – Welsh Parliament: Vale of Glamorgan

St Hilary (Welsh: Saint Hilari) is a village in the Vale of Glamorgan, Wales. It is located just south of the A48, about a mile southeast of the market town of Cowbridge. The village has a population of about 260, in approximately 80 houses. Notable landmarks in the vicinity include The Bush Inn, the Church of St Hilary, the Old Beaupre Castle, New Beaupre, Coed Hills and St. Hilary mast.

== Name ==
The dedication of a church to the French bishop and saint Hilary of Poitiers is unusual for Britain and probably initially reflected a foundation credited to either the Breton missionary and saint Ilar or the native pilgrim and saint Elian. The relative obscurity of these saints, however, has led the Church in Wales to consider this church a dedication to Saint Hilary instead, at least as early as the beginning of the 20th century.

Saint Hilary's own connection with Wales arose from confused accounts that he ordained Saint Cybi as a bishop, although the two were separated by two centuries. Baring-Gould suggests this may have arisen from a confusion with Saint Elian, who was a relative of Cybi's.

== Geography ==
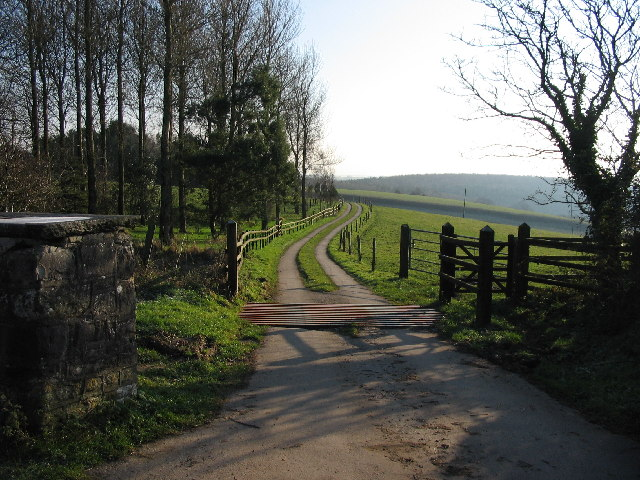
Entrance to Coed Hills

The village lies just south of the A48, a few miles west of Cardiff and about a mile southeast of Cowbridge. In 1845, it had a population of 164 people and had an area of 1,200 acres (490 ha). The parish is bounded on the north by that of Llanblethian; on the south by Llancarfan, St Mary Church and The Herberts; on the east by Llantrithyd; and on the west by Llandough and Llanblethian. The hamlets of The Garn and Ty-draw lie on the road to Llantrithyd to the east. The River Thaw runs between St Hilary and St. Mary Church.

The St Hilary Conservation Area was designated a special architectural and historic interest site in October 1971.

== Landmarks ==
The village dates from medieval times with a parish church, rectory, and a pub, the thatched roofed Grade II listed The Bush Inn. The whole village, which was built surrounding the parish church, lies in the agricultural heartland of the Vale of Glamorgan. To the northwest near the A48 is the St Hilary Down and a monument commemorating the dead of the Glamorgan Yeomanry. To the southeast of the village is the Coed Hills Rural Landscape, an alternative artspace established in 1997, designed following principles of low impact development. In 2002, the site featured Mongolian yurts.

The village also contains an Iron Age roundhouse and formerly contained the St Hilary school, the smallest in the county with just 10 pupils recorded in 1678. The village school closed in 1910; children in the village now generally go to the school in St. Mary Church.

=== Listed buildings ===
Listed buildings in St Hilary and Old Beaupre

The following are the listed buildings in St Hilary and Old Beaupre. The listings are graded:

- Church of St Hilary (II*)
- Churchyard cross, Church of St. Hilary (II)
- Bassett Family Tomb Enclosure, Church of St. Hilary (II)
- The Bush Inn (II)
- Pigsty in garden of Church Cottage (II)
- No 1 Manor Cottages (Prev. Nos. 1 and 2, Manor Cottages) (II)
- No. 2 Manor Cottages (II)
- The Manor (II)
- Village Farm (II)
- Telephone Call-Box opposite Village Farm (II)
- The Cottage (II)
- New Beaupre (II)
- Old Beaupre Farmhouse (II*)
- Former Hall Range to South of Old Beaupre Castle (II) (SAM)
- Old Beaupre Barn (II)

=== Country houses ===
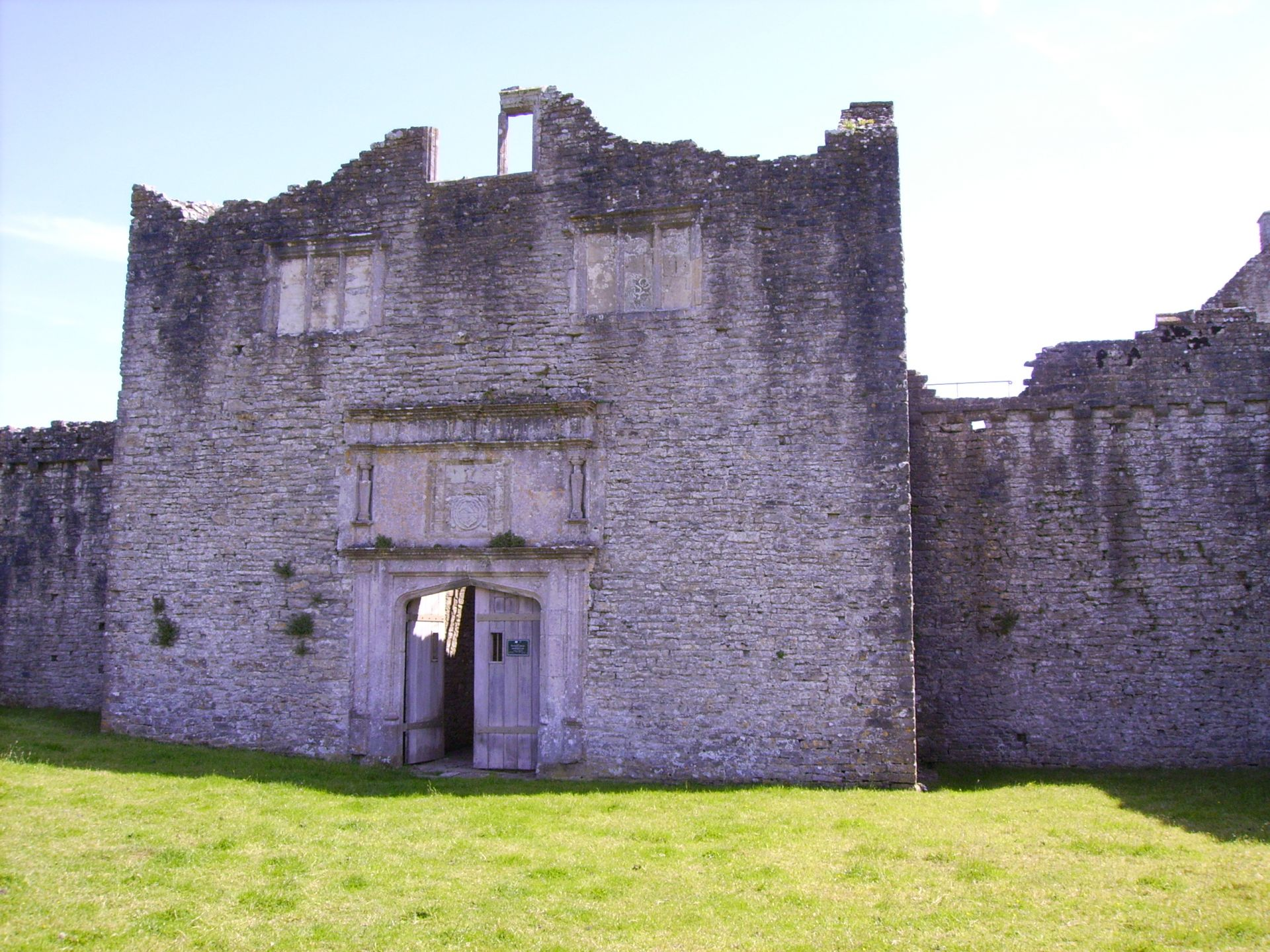
Old Beaupre Castle

There are two notable country houses. Among the most conspicuous is the now ruined Grade I listed Old Beaupre Castle, which stands to the south on the site of one of the palaces of the royal house of Sitsyllt, the progenitors of the family of the Cecils, Marquesses of Salisbury and Exeter; it is supposed to have been one of the most ancient in the vale. It is situated in a meadow about 1 mile (1.6 km) from the village. Originally called Beau Pre (pronounced 'Bewper'), on which spot the present mansion, now in a ruinous condition, was built about the year 1600. A notable feature is the ornamental porch attached to the principal front of the building, which is considered one of the earliest specimens of the Grecian style of architecture introduced into this country, and was erected at the expense of Richard Bassett, Esq. It consists of three stages of columns of which the lowest is of the Doric, the middle of the Tuscan, and the upper of the Corinthian order. Te capitals, intaglios, and other sculptures are well made. Immediately over the entrance are the family arms, sculptured in alto-relievo, with a commemorative inscription in Roman capitals. Captain Richard Bassett was lord of the manor of Beau Pre, under the will of his distant relation, the late Daniel Jones, Esq., who died in 1841, and who had bought the estate in 1797 of the late C. Traherne, Esq., and Miss Edmondes.

The Grade II listed New Beaupre is situated about 0.5 miles (0.80 km) to the north of Old Beaupre Castle. It was built by the late Daniel Jones, Esq.

St. Hilary Cottage, or St Hilary, was the residence of the late Llewelyn Traherne, a portion of which was the abode of the Bassets before they possessed Beau Pre. In the 1840s, Rev. John Montgomery Traherne was lord of the manor of St Hilary, which his family purchased in the year 1758.

=== Church ===
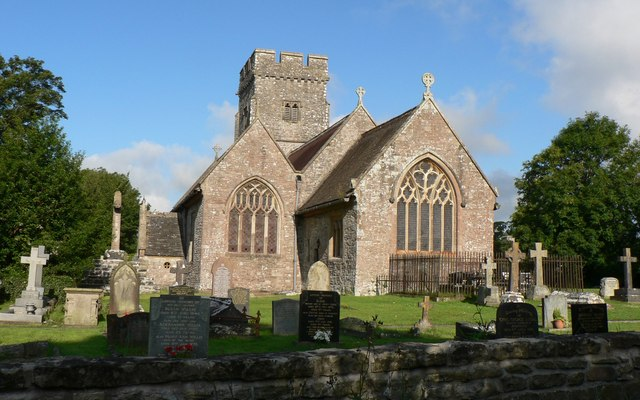
St Hilary Church

The 14th century, red-tiled Grade II* listed Church of St Hilary is a substantial structure in the later English style, consisting of a nave, south aisle, and chancel, with an embattled tower at the west end. The nave is 45 feet (14 m) long and 33 feet (10 m) broad including the aisle. The chancel 22 feet (6.7 m) long and 15 feet (4.6 m) wide. The eastern window of the south aisle is elegantly design, and that of the chancel is ornamented with stained glass, representing the arms of the Traherne family.

=== Mast ===
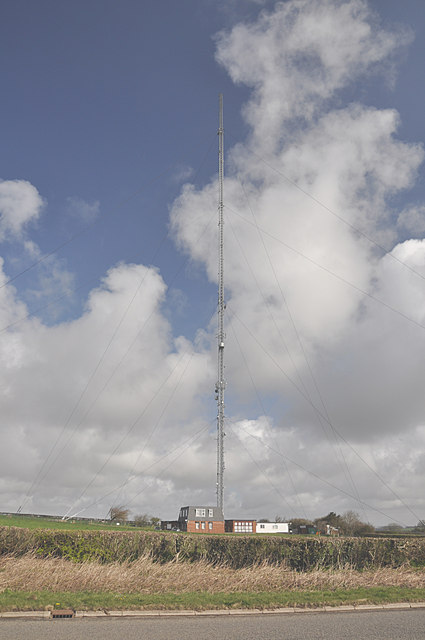
St. Hilary mast

On the high ground to the north of the village (and just north of the A48) stands the 229 m (750 ft) St. Hilary mast, built in 1957 for transmitting the now-defunct 405-line/Channel 7 TV system to South Wales and the West of England.

== Notable people ==
- Richard Bassett, (fl. 15th century), lord of the manor of Old Beau Pre
- John Montgomery Traherne (fl. 1840s), reverend, lord of the manor of St Hilary
- Llewelyn Traherne (1766–1842), High Sheriff of Glamorgan
