= Llewelyn Traherne =

Welsh judge (1766–1842)

Llewelyn Traherne (13 March 1766 – 5 December 1842) was a Welsh magistrate and briefly High Sheriff of Glamorgan in 1801.

== Early years ==
He was born in Cardiff, the only son of Edmund Traherne, esq. of Castellau, County of Glamorgan, by his first wife Mary Llewellyn (d. 1767), or Llewelyn, of St Donats. He was adopted by John Llewellyn, Esq. of Coedarhydyglyn, who eventually made Traherne his heir. Traherne was educated by Rev. John Williams, of Margam. In 1773, he entered to the College School at Gloucester, and in 1780, he entered Winchester College in Commoners. He attended New College, Oxford from October 1783 through June 1786.

== Career ==
Traherne spent his career in the County of Glamorgan. He was a Justice of the Peace in 1783; was an active Magistrate; officiated as chairman of Quarter Sessions; and was appointed Receiver General in 1792. He was gazetted and sworn in as High Sheriff in 1801, but because of a misunderstanding with George Hardinge, then Chief Justice of the Brecon Circuit, he was superseded before the first Assizes. Traherne, a Whig, supported the Reform Bill, and was an opponent of the New Poor Law.

== Personal life ==
In 1787, he married Charlotte (d. 1791), the daughter of John Edmonds, Esq. of St Hilary, Vale of Glamorgan, by whom he had a son, John Montgomery Traherne (1788-1860), and three daughters, Charlotte-Frances, Maria-Eleanor, Louisa. Charlotte Traherne's children became the representatives of the ancient families of Dive of Ranton, Staffordshire, and Metham of North Cave, Yorkshire. They inherited a considerable property in right of their grandmother, Charlotte Dive. In 1792, Traherne married Barbara-Maria Manning, by whom he had a son, Rev. George Traherne, Vicar of St. Hilary and rector of St. George's, Co. Glamorgan. Traherne spent most of his life at his residence, St. Hilary, near Cowbridge where his son was a reverend at the Church of St Hilary. He became ill in August 1841, and died on 5 December 1842.
