= Cheirotonia =

Cheirotonia or Chirotonia (Greek: χειροτονία) etymologically means "hand-stretching." It acquired a few different meanings, which survive as technical terms:

- Christian laying on of hands, by which the authority of the Holy Spirit is considered passed between individuals, sometimes used in a secular sense to mean hand-picked succession
- ordination, the official investment by a religious group with authority as a leader of some sort, whether sacerdotal, ministerial, or other
- suffrage in the general sense, from assenting by a theoretical raising the hand, which was in fact implemented by a number of methods not involving hand-raising
