= Llanfair, Vale of Glamorgan =

Coordinates: 51.436°N 3.440°W

Llanfair
- Community
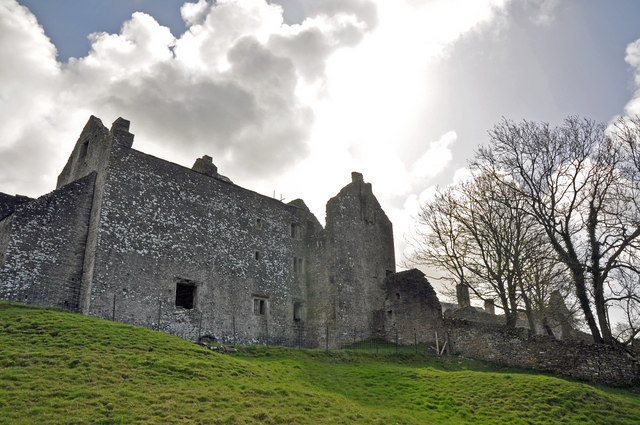
- Old Beaupre Castle
- Principal area: Vale of Glamorgan
- Country: Wales
- Sovereign state: United Kingdom
- Police: South Wales
- Fire: South Wales
- Ambulance: Welsh
- List of places UK Wales Vale of Glamorgan Map of the community

Llanfair is a community in the Vale of Glamorgan, Wales. It is located immediately south of the town of Cowbridge and includes the settlements of St Hilary, Llandough, St Mary Church and The Herberts. The population in 2011 was 611.

Llanfair has a community council comprising eight councillors, who meet regularly at St Hilary Village Hall. For elections to the Vale of Glamorgan Council the community is part of the Cowbridge electoral ward.

Buildings of note in Llanfair include Old Beaupre Castle near St Hilary, which is Grade I listed and Llandough Castle which is Grade II* listed. St Hilary's parish church is also Grade II* listed.
