= St Hilary's Church, St Hilary, Vale of Glamorgan =

Coordinates: 51.449922°N 3.417725°W

Church of St Hilary
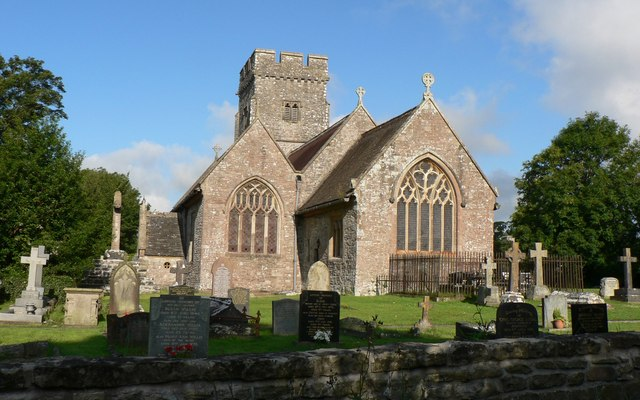
- Church of St Hilary

- Location within the Vale of Glamorgan
- Location: St Hilary, Vale of Glamorgan
- Country: Wales
- Denomination: Anglican

History
- Founded: 14th century

Architecture
- Functional status: Active
- Architectural type: Church

Specifications
- Materials: Stone

The Parish Church of St Hilary (Welsh: Eglwys Sant Ilar) is a Grade II* listed Anglican church in the village of St Hilary in the Vale of Glamorgan, south Wales. It is one of 11 churches in the Parish of Cowbridge. It became a listed building on 22 February 1963.

== Name ==
The dedication of a church to the French bishop and saint Hilary of Poitiers is unusual for Britain and probably initially reflected a foundation credited to either the Breton missionary and saint Ilar or the native pilgrim and saint Elian. The relative obscurity of these saints, however, has led the Church in Wales to consider this church a dedication to Saint Hilary instead, at least as early as the beginning of the 20th century.

Saint Hilary's own connection with Wales arose from confused accounts that he ordained Saint Cybi as a bishop, although the two were separated by two centuries. Baring-Gould suggests this may have arisen from a confusion with Saint Elian, who was a relative of Cybi's.

== Architecture ==
The 14th century, red-tiled church is a substantial structure in the later English style, consisting of a nave, south aisle, and chancel, with a 16th-century embattled tower at the west end. The nave is 45 feet (14 m) long and 33 feet (10 m) broad including the aisle. The chancel 22 feet (6.7 m) long and 15 feet (4.6 m) wide and the arch dates further back to the twelfth century, evidently from the earlier building which was situated on the site. The eastern window of the south aisle is elegantly design, and that of the chancel is ornamented with stained glass, representing the arms of the Traherne family. The Bassett Family Tomb Enclosure is listed as a Grade II building in its own right. In the chancel is a recumbent figure, in armour, with a Latin inscription, to the memory of Thomas Bassett of Old Beau Pre, who died in 1423. In the south aisle, there is a tablet to the memory of the late Mrs. Traherne, who died in 1796, and to that of her sister, Anna Maria Edmondes.

The church was restored in 1861–1862 "at the expense of Mrs Charlotte Traherne of Coedriglan" under the designs of the architect Sir George Gilbert Scott and Reverend John Montgomery Traherne. A memorial plaque on the lych gate commemorates parishioners who died in World War I.
