= Cennydd Traherne =

Welsh landowner (1910–1995)

Sir Cennydd Traherne KG TD

Lord Lieutenant of South, Mid and West Glamorgan
- In office 1974-1985

Lord Lieutenant of Glamorgan
- In office 1952-1974

Personal details
- Born: 14 December 1910 Coedarhydyglyn, Wales
- Died: 26 January 1995 (aged 84)
- Education: Brasenose College, Oxford
- Awards: Knight Companion of the Garter; Freedom of the Borough; Freedom of the City of Cardiff

Sir Cennydd George Traherne (14 December 1910 – 26 January 1995) was a notable Welsh landowner.

== Biography ==
Sir Cennydd was born at Coedarhydyglyn near Cardiff, and was educated at Wellington College and Brasenose College, Oxford.

He owned Dyffryn House in Glamorgan, among other properties, but in 1939 he leased it to the local authority. After distinguished service in World War II, he went into politics, but failed to be elected in 1945 as MP for the Pontypridd constituency. He was made a Knight Companion of the Garter in 1970; his appointment was the 941st appointment to that Order since its creation in 1348. He was Lord Lieutenant of Glamorgan from 1952 until 1974 when, on the splitting of the lieutenancy, he became Lord Lieutenant of South, Mid and West Glamorgan with a lieutenant serving under him for each. He retired from the post in 1985.

He was awarded the Freedom of the Borough of the Vale of Glamorgan on 19 March 1984. He was awarded the Freedom of the City of Cardiff on 29 January 1985.

After his death in 1995 his Order of the Garter Banner was moved from St George's Chapel, Windsor Castle to Llandaff Cathedral in Cardiff.

Coat of arms of Cennydd Traherne
Notes Traherne's right to the arms was established 21 November 1949 for all the descendants of his grandfather. Escutcheon Argent a chevron Sable between three ravens proper on a canton barry of six Argent and Azure a lion rampant Gules. Orders The Order of the Garter Symbolism Hubert Chesshyre suggests that the Traherene arms must originally have been "a chevron between three herons", as a pun on the surname. (Thomas Treheron (or Trahern) bore similar arms but with herons in place of ravens.)
