= Alexander Hamilton of Innerwick =

Scottish landowner and supporter of Mary, Queen of Scots

Alexander Hamilton of Innerwick was a Scottish landowner and supporter of Mary, Queen of Scots.

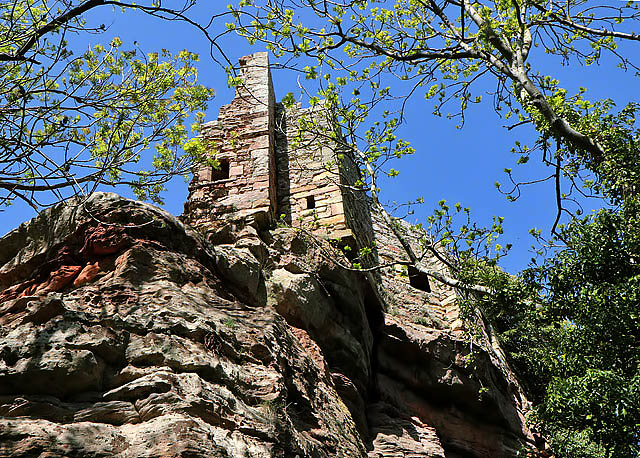
Innerwick Castle

== Career ==
His home was Innerwick Castle in East Lothian, Scotland, near the village of Innerwick.

He was a son of James Hamilton of Innerwick and Helen Home, a daughter of Mungo Home of Coldingknowes.

In September 1567, Regent Moray ordered Alexander Hamilton of Innerwick to go into ward (confinement) at Falkland Palace. The holders of neighbouring strongholds were also detained at this time.

In 1568 Mary, Queen of Scots, escaped from Lochleven Castle and made her way to Hamilton. Alexander Hamilton of Innerwick signed the bond made at Hamilton to support Mary. He came "in arrayed battle" to the battle of Langside, where her forces were defeated by Regent Moray.

Regent Moray brought Hamilton of Innerwick and six other Hamilton lairds captured on the battlefield as prisoners to Edinburgh to stand trial in the tolbooth. The lairds were condemned and their hands were bound for execution, but they were given a reprieve and imprisoned in Edinburgh Castle.

== Family ==
He married Isobel Home (died 1591), a daughter of Bartholmew Home of Simprim. Their children included:

- Alexander Hamilton of Innerwick, who married Alison Home. Their daughter Jean Hamilton, married Mark Ker, a son of John Ker of Hirsel, and built a house at Spylaw. He was made a denizen of England in 1610 and granted lands at Clankeine in Tullochouchoe, County Cavan. His son Claude Hamilton was also naturalized in August 1610 and granted adjacent lands in Ireland, described as a "small proportion of Clovin alias Taghleah in Tullochouchoe, County Cavan".
- Elizabeth Hamilton, who married John Maxwell of Calderwood.
- Margaret Hamilton, who married John Murray of Black Barony
