= Coedarhydyglyn =

Country house in the Vale of Glamorgan, Wales

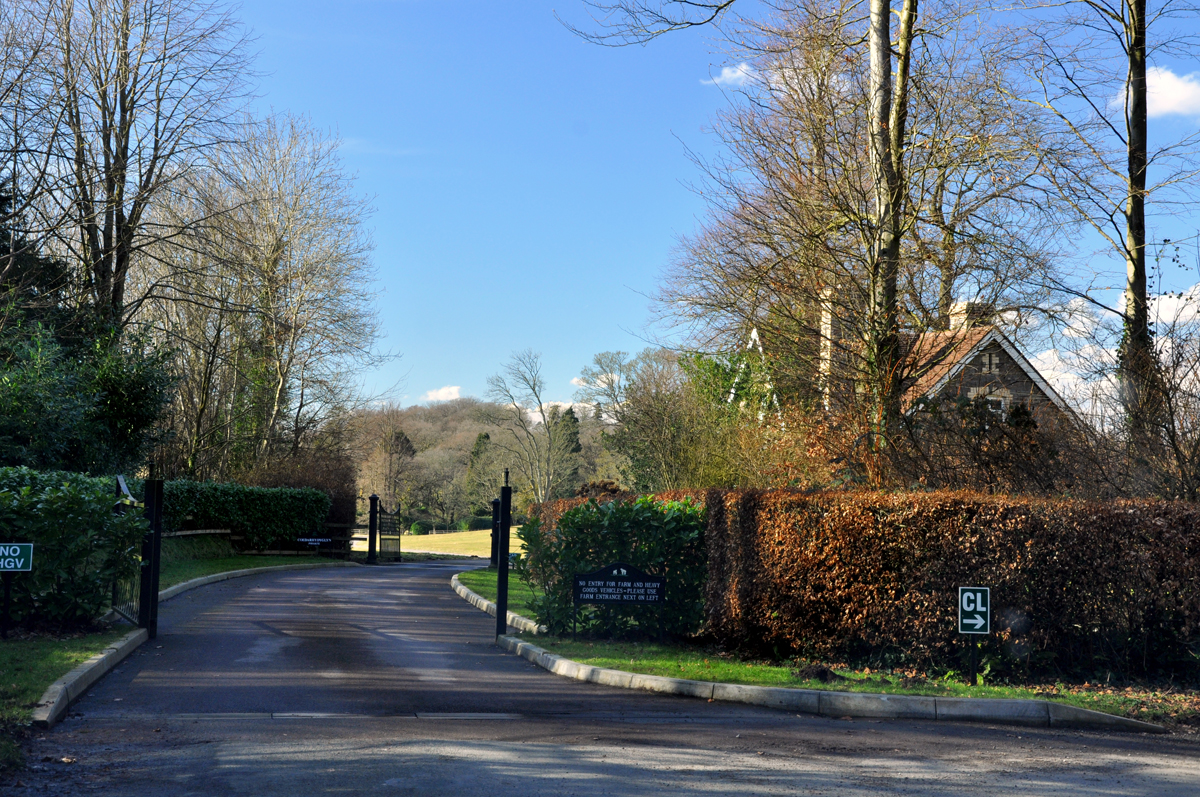
- South Lodge and drive of Coedarhydyglyn Park

- Location within Vale of Glamorgan

General information
- Architectural style: Neo-classical
- Location: Near St Georges-super-Ely, Vale of Glamorgan, Wales
- Coordinates: 51°28′5″N 3°17′26″W
- Completed: 1820

Coedarhydyglyn or Coedriglan, formerly Old Coedarhydyglyn (meaning 'the wood along the glen'), is a private Grade I listed neo-classical regency villa and estate on the western rim of Cardiff, less than half a mile from Culverhouse Cross, southeast Wales. It is accessed via the A48 road between Cardiff and St. Nicholas at the top of "The Tumble" hill leading up from Culverhouse Cross and Coedarhydyglyn Lane which leads to Drope to the north. The estate lies between the villages of St Georges-super-Ely (to the northwest) and Downs (to the south) just inside the boundary of the Vale of Glamorgan.

== History ==
Set in extensive gardens, the house, made of stone with stuccoed elevations and stone plinth, was built in 1820 for Llewelyn Traherne (1766–1841), replacing an earlier 18th century building, Old Coedarhydyglyn, which lay on the high ridge to the southwest to the east of the present walled garden. The earlier house had been built in 1767 and was owned by John Llewellin, who married Edmund Traherne of Castellau's sister. When John died in 1786, the estate was inherited by Llewelyn Traherne, the son of his sister (who had married Edmund Traherne), and Coedarhydyglyn became the principal seat of the Traherne family. The old house was demolished in 1823, although parts remain. The replacement building was said to be "in the style of Edward Haycock Snr, of Shrewsbury, who designed Clytha House, Monmouthshire". Its owner, Reverend John Montgomery Traherne, during the 19th century, was a notable scholar and collector of scientific manuscripts. During the 1880s, Coedarhydyglyn was reportedly a breeding centre for the golden oriole. Sir Cennydd Traherne, born here on 14 December 1910, was a notable owner in the 20th century; he was Lord Lieutenant of Glamorgan from 1952 to 1974.

== Architecture ==
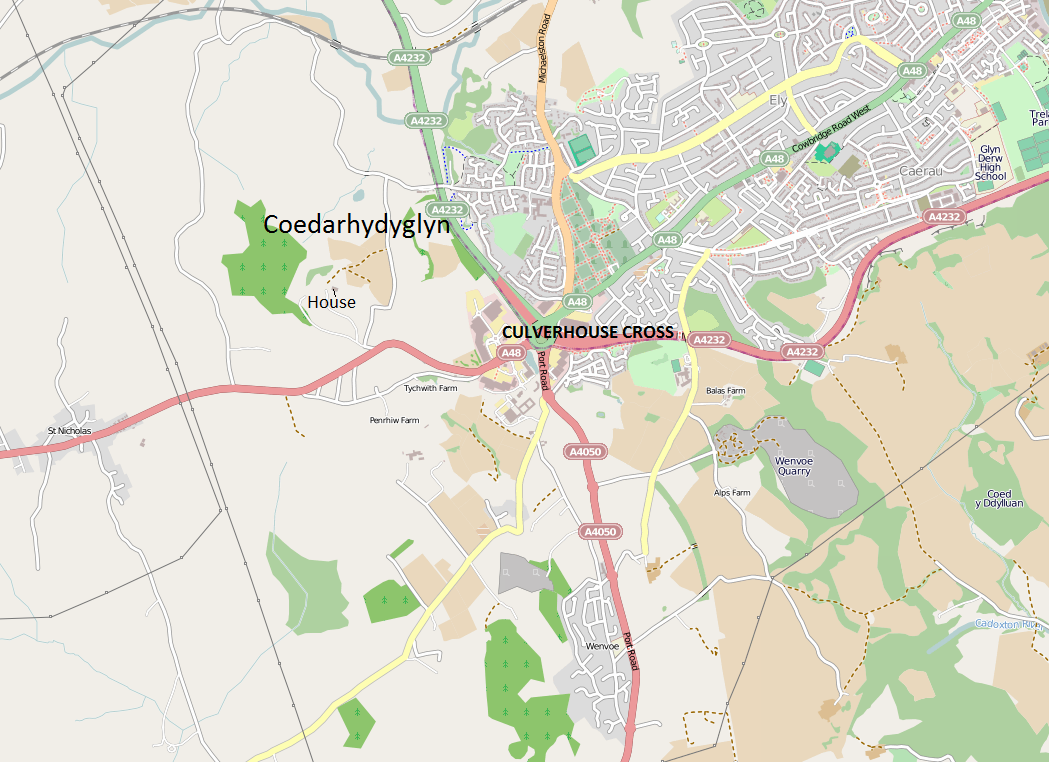
Local map

The site contains four listed buildings, listed on 13 September 1994. The main house and outer buildings are Grade I listed, the Coach-house and stables are Grade II* listed, and the Gate and Gatepliers beside the South Lodge and the Gate and Gatepliers midway along the drive are Grade II listed. The house and estate are also listed on the Cadw/Icomos Register of Landscapes, Parks and Gardens of Special Historic Interest in Wales by the Royal Commission on the Ancient and Historical Monuments of Wales. The main house is a square, white stuccoed two-storey building. It contains sash windows and "a central single-storey green sandstone portico with four unfluted Doric columns" at the main entrance. The roof is made of slate, while the eaves are wide and bracketed. Outside the canted central three bays on the west front is a verandah. A fretwork frieze is located at the top of the building.

== Grounds ==
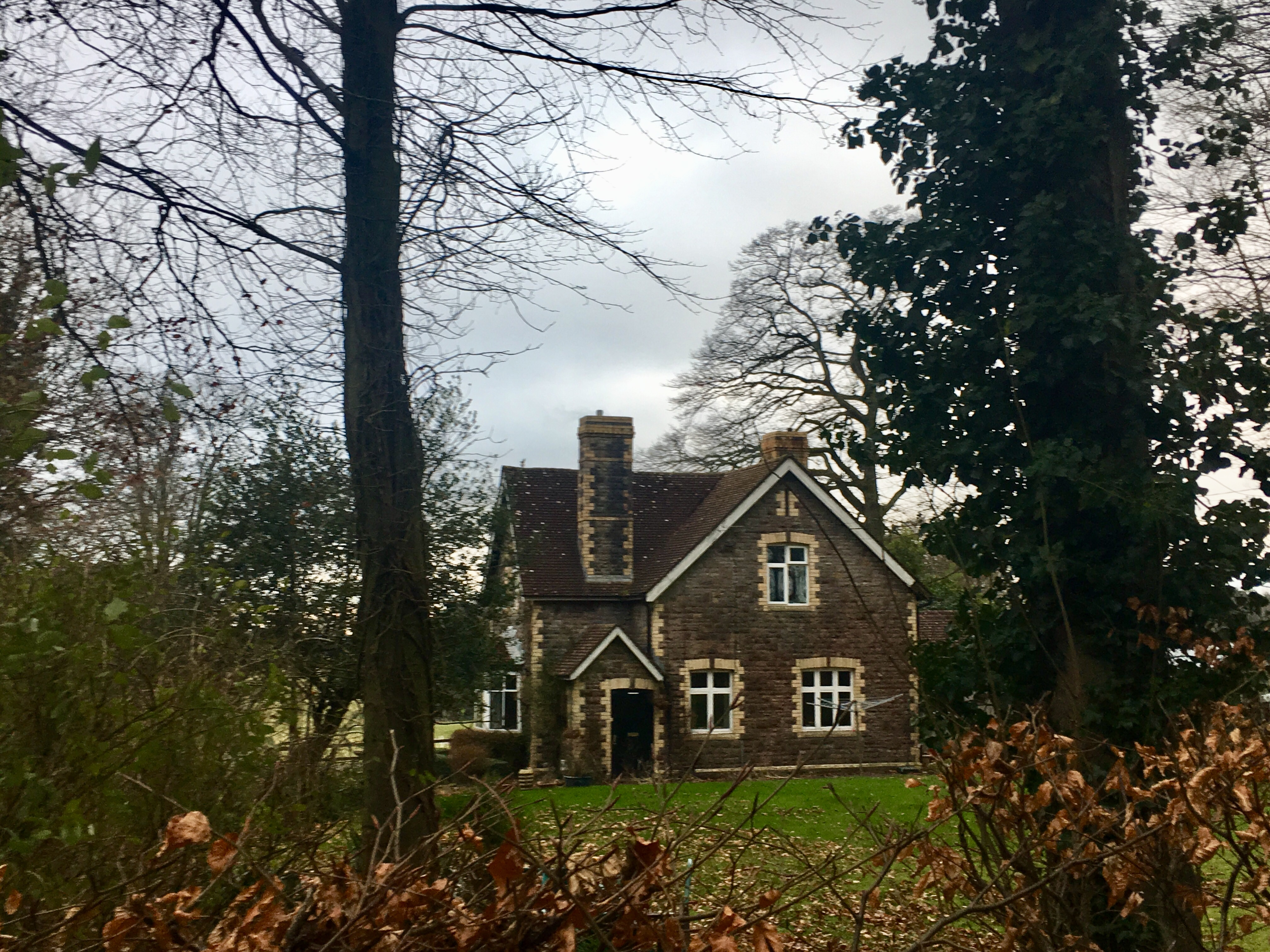
The south lodge of Coedarhydyglyn

The property is situated in the centre of a park which is designated Grade II* on the Cadw/ICOMOS Register of Parks and Gardens of Special Historic Interest in Wales. Secluded and quiet, the parkland is on rolling ground facing away from the trunk road and contains partially fenced pasture. The highest part of the grounds are in the area of Old Coedarhydyglyn and its walled garden. Below this is a dry valley that has a stream in what is known as the "Dell" area. The stream is culverted at one point before emerging in a woodland section that, flowing to a pond near the standing house. On the south-west side of the garden is a wooden Japanese tea-house. Other features include a pinetum, terraced garden, as well as a walled kitchen garden. A small court, located on the east side of the property, is partly closed by a rubble wall, while a wall with arched opening is situated on the east side in the area separating the house from the service range. A gravel drive, gravel yard, stable block and coach house are also located on the grounds.

A woodland of conifers and rhododendrons were mainly planted in the 1940s and 1950s, possibly by Alfred Parsons and partners. There are single trees, clumped areas, as well as beech tree belts. Other plantings include pines and large sycamore. Oaks and limes are situated along the drive.

The property is one of many sites used for the filming of the Doctor Who series, along with other programs such as Torchwood: Children of Earth, Sherlock and A Discovery of Witches. The Cardiff Naturalists' Society has an outdoor meeting near the house in the summer months. A Neolithic flint axe head was unearthed near Coedarhydyglyn during the ploughing of a field.
