= Berwick Pursuivant =

Berwick Pursuivant of Arms in Ordinary was an English office of arms created around 1460 for service on the Scottish Marches based at Berwick-upon-Tweed. In the 16th century there was also a Herald or Pursuivant based at Carlisle on the west border.

The offices lapsed after the Union of the Crowns in 1603 made their main purpose of communicating between the English and Scottish monarchs redundant.

== Charles Wriothesley ==
Charles Wriothesley, author of A Chronicle of England, 1485–1559, was appointed Berwick Pursuivant at the age of 16 in 1524.

== Leonard Warcup ==
The Scottish courtier Adam Otterburn arranged for Leonard Warcup, Berwick Pursuivant, to meet James V of Scotland on 26 June 1529. Warcup had previously been Carlisle Pursuivant, an equivalent office in the West border. In August 1534, Warcup was described as newly made Carlisle Herald. An old authority states that Warcup was made Berwick Pursuivant by Henry VII. On 29 December 1542 the Carlisle Pursuivant was appointed to conduct prisoners from the Battle of Solway Moss into England.

Leonard was the last Carlisle Herald, and held that appointment in the reign of Mary I of England.

== Henry Ray ==
While serving as Berwick Pursuivant, Henry Ray twice met secretly with Margaret Tudor, widow of James IV, at Holyroodhouse in 1537. As a herald in Scotland he wore the English royal arms upon his breast. She told him to change his apparel and put on a Scottish cloak and hat and meet her in a gallery in her lodging. He witnessed James V and his French bride Madeleine of Valois arrive at Leith on Whitsun-Eve 19 May 1537. Ray was Ralph Sadler's go-between in Scotland, and he even found his lodgings. In February 1540 Ray had to argue with the Provost of Edinburgh over a billet, and a servant of Margaret Tudor told his mistress, who told the king, who ordered the Bishop of Ross to move out and make room for the English party.

Ray came to Stirling Castle at the end of May 1541 and delivered letters from Henry VIII to James V in the Chapel Royal. He sent messages to Margaret Tudor who sent him a gift of a black velvet doublet. In June, the king was sad for the loss of his two princes. He reported that workmen in Edinburgh Castle were making cannon and gunpowder.

Ray went to Methven Castle to make inquiries after the death of Margaret Tudor in November 1541. He heard she died of a sudden palsy and had not made a will. She had asked her son James V to come to her from Falkland Palace but he was too late. She asked that James V should be good to her former husband the Earl of Angus and her daughter Margaret Douglas. When James V arrived at Methven he asked John Tennent and Oliver Sinclair to lock up her things for his use. She had 2,500 merks in ready money, which Ray considered a small sum.

In March 1539, Henry Ray was in Edinburgh with the Lancaster Herald. The Duke of Norfolk sent Ray's news to Thomas Cromwell. Ray had heard a proclamation that all Scotsmen should be ready for war. A "secret friend" who was an associate of the banished Earl of Angus and an officer of the Scottish royal ordinance had told him that 16 great cannons or culverins and 60 smaller guns had been refurnished or newly made in Edinburgh Castle. All the guns would be ready 20 days after Easter. Ray had attended a sermon preached by a Friar to Mary of Guise in Linlithgow. His Scottish acquaintances told him that if England made peace with France, all three countries would be at peace.

James V gave him £4-8s in June 1542. On 25 November 1542 he left Edinburgh with Somerset Herald, Thomas Trahern, accompanied by the Scottish Dingwall Pursuivant. Two miles from Dunbar Somerset was murdered. Ray and Dingwall escaped and found a refuge at Innerwick Castle. The murderers were said to be two English veterans of the Pilgrimage of Grace, William Leche and John Prestman.

In September 1543 he took Ralph's messages to Regent Arran at Stirling Castle during the coronation of Mary, Queen of Scots. The war of the Rough Wooing began between England and Scotland with Henry Ray's declaration in Edinburgh on 20 December 1543. He was captured before the battle of Pinkie in 1544, but released and taken to Hume Castle, which was held for England by Edward Sutton, 4th Baron Dudley.

Ray was rewarded £12 for delivering letters in Edinburgh in December 1551, £12 in January 1553 and £15 in February. Later, Ray was detained by French troops at Dunbar on 4 April 1560 when he was bringing letters from Mary of Guise declining to end the Siege of Leith. He was sometimes called Harry Berwick. Gilbert Dethick wrote to him on 3 April 1565 to buy some salmon for a St George's Day feast, and addressed him as "Harry Ree, alias Barwicke Pursuivant at Armes".

== Richard St George ==
Sir Richard St George began his heraldic service at the College of Arms in this capacity in 1602.
