= The Bush Inn =

Pub in the Vale of Glamorgan, Wales

Coordinates: 51°27′7″N 3°25′8″W

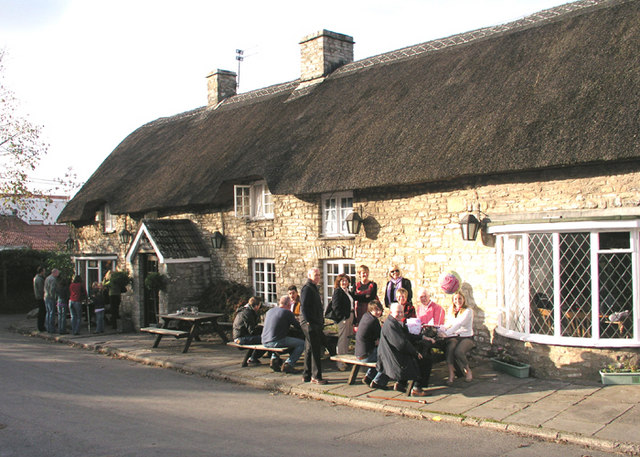
Bush Inn, St Hilary

The Bush Inn is a Grade II listed public house in St Hilary, near Cowbridge, Vale of Glamorgan, south Wales. The current inn dates to the 16th century. It has a thatched roof, thick stone walls, low oak beams, flagstone floors, old pews, a stone spiral staircase, and an inglenook fireplace. The benches outside the pub look across to the Church of St Hilary.

Iolo Morganwg was known to have visited the pub. The Rough Guide to Wales praised its food and "cosy" atmosphere. Egon Ronay's Lucas Guide in the late 1970s said "People come from Cardiff and Swansea to St Hilary for the sake of this stone-built thatched pub, which offers table skittles or darts in the tile-floored public bar." The Automobile Association named the Bush Inn "Welsh Pub of the Year 2008/9".
