= Treherne =

Treherne may refer to:

- Treherne, Manitoba, a town in southern Manitoba, Canada
  - Municipality of Norfolk Treherne, a rural municipality in Manitoba
  - Treherne Airport, located near Treherne, Manitoba, Canada
  - Treherne (South Norfolk Airpark) Aerodrome, located near Treherne, Manitoba, Canada
- Harold Treherne (c. 1884 – after 1908), an English stamp forger notable for his forgeries of the stamps of India and Australia
- John Treherne (1929–1989), an English entomologist
- Treherne Parker (born 1968), an English cricketer

== See also ==
- Traherne (disambiguation)
