= Saint Ilar =

Welsh 6th century saint

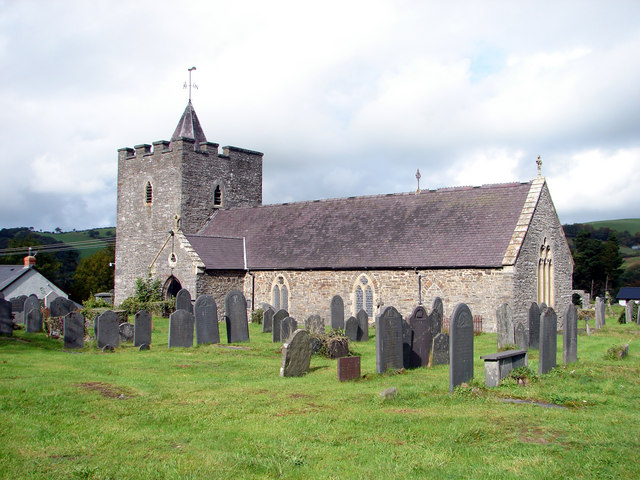
- St Hilary's Church in Llanilar

Martyr
- Died: 6th century
- Canonized: Pre-Congregation
- Feast: 13, 14, or 15 January (lapsed)
- Patronage: Llanilar; Trefilan

A Saint Ilar ([iːlɑr]; Latin: Hilarus or Elerius) is listed among the 6th-century saints of Wales and is the probable namesake of Llanilar in Ceredigion (Note: Wade-Evans, A.W. "Parochiale Wallicanum" in Y Commrodor, Vol. XXII, p. 62. Honorable Society of Cymmrodorion (London), 1910. Cited in Bartrum.) (Note: "Bonedd y Saint" in the Myvyrian Archæology, p. 426, cited in Notes & Queries.) and its former hundred of Ilar. His feast day is variously given as 13, 14, or 15 January, but is no longer observed by either the Anglican or Catholic church in Wales.

== Name and Identity ==
Although he has been consistently conflated with Saint Hilary of Poitiers and shares a similar saint's day (Hilary's being observed on the 13th), the Welsh saint is often listed separately as Ilar Bysgotwr (Note: Compare the Latin piscator.) ("Hilary the Fisherman"). (Note: Morris, Lewis. "Alphabetic Bonedd" (BL Add. MS. 14 928 fo. 36v.). Printed in The Myvyrian Archaiology of Wales, 2nd ed., p. 426. (Denbigh), 1870. Cited in Bartrum.) He is also given the epithets Ilar Droedwyn ("Hilary Whitefoot") and Ilar Ferthyr ("Hilary the Martyr"). The bishop of Poitiers, meanwhile, was a confessor and died peacefully.

Saint Hilary's own connection with Wales arose from confused accounts that he ordained Saint Cybi as a bishop, although the two were separated by two centuries. Baring-Gould suggests this may have arisen from a confusion between Hilary and Cybi's relative Saint Elian, and some of the dedications to either saint may have originally been in honor of him. Another Saint Hilary, the 5th-century Pope Hilarius, was credited in Welsh legend with ordaining Saint Elvis, who in turn baptized Saint David, the patron saint of Wales.

== Life ==
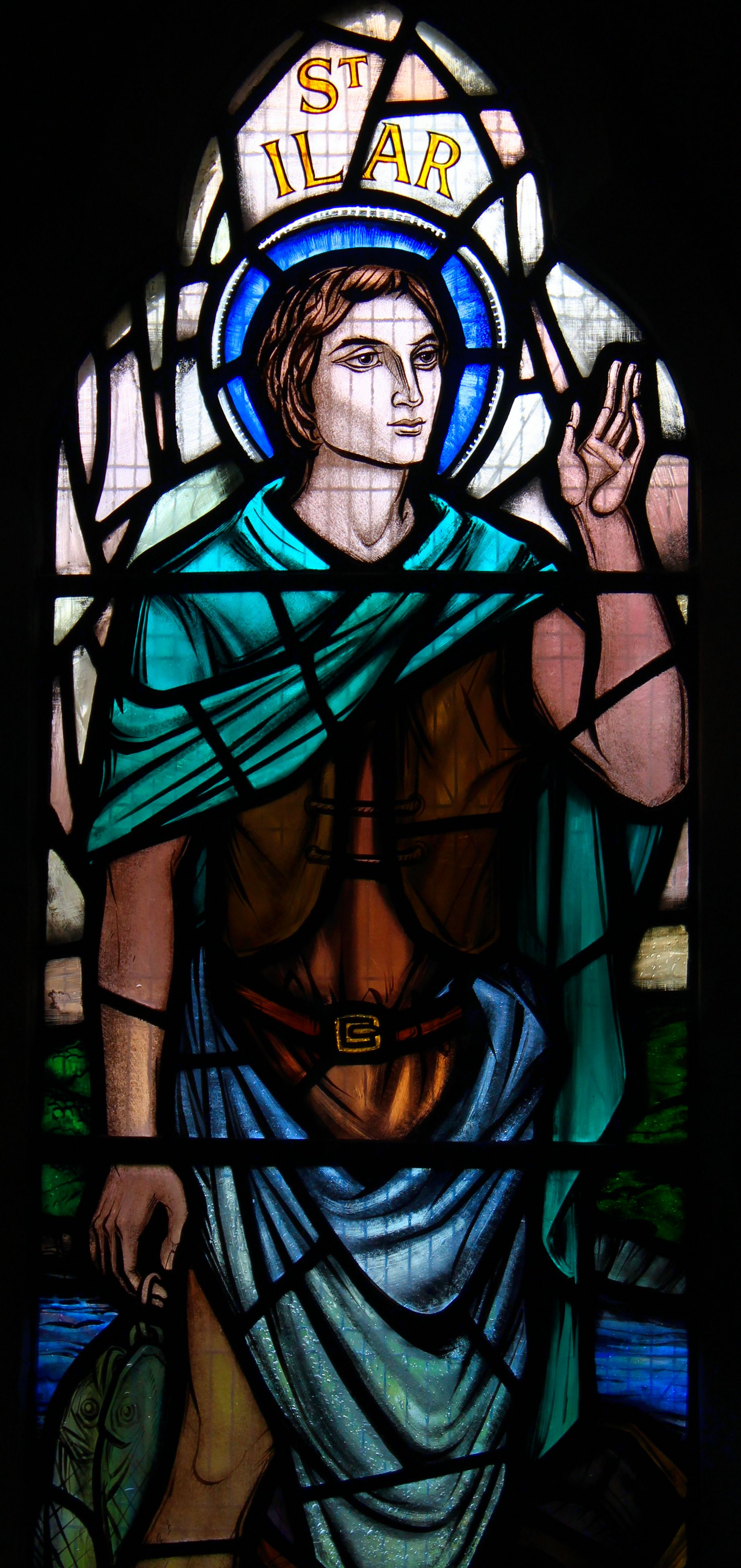
Saint Ilar, 'St Hilary's Church', Llanilar, Aberystwyth, Ceredigion,

Ilar is a very obscure saint and few details survive apart from his name. Surviving records name Saint Ilar as a Breton companion of Padarn and Cadfan's 6th-century mission to Wales. He may have come from Armorica. The parishes bearing his name are to the south of Tywyn (credited to Cadfan) but near some credited to Padarn. As a martyr, he may have been killed by the pagan Irish or Saxon invasions of the time.

== Legacy ==
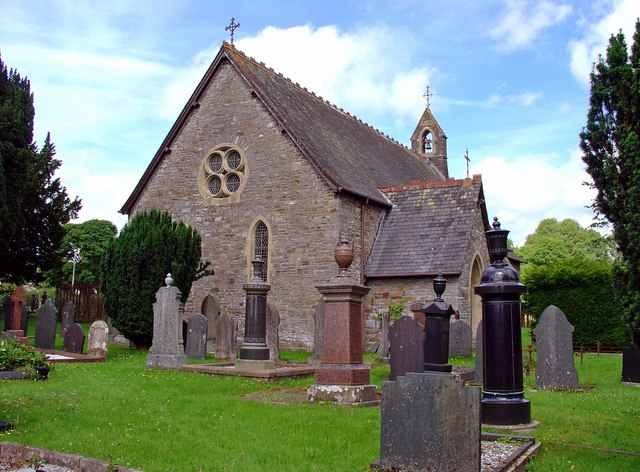
The church at Trefilan

In addition to the parish church at Llanilar, the church at Trefilan in Ceredigion near Lampeter is also dedicated to Saint Ilar or Hilary, the name of the community having been corrupted from an original Tref Ilar (lit. "Town of Ilar"). The Church in Wales also administers churches dedicated to Saint Hilary at Erbistock in Wrexham, Killay in Swansea, and the village of St Hilary near Cowbridge in the Vale of Glamorgan. Rees and others considered all of the churches of "Saint Hilary" possible remnants of dedications to Ilar. Despite a conflicting account in the Iolo Manuscripts and the Enwogion Cymru, Baring-Gould opined that the church at Cowbridge was certainly dedicated to the French saint.

The 15th-century poet Lewis Glyn Cothi mentions gwyl Ilar hael a'i loer hir ("the festival of generous Ilar with his long moon") in his work.

Saint Ilar, his holy well and legends, and his accidental replacement by the French bishop Hilary appear in Arthur Machen's 1907 short story "Levavi Oculos" and its reworked form as part of his 1922 novel The Secret Glory, about a schoolboy's encounter with the Holy Grail of Welsh and Arthurian legend.

== See also ==
- Saint Eleri, sometimes given as "Saint Ilar"
