= Downs, Vale of Glamorgan =

Coordinates: 51.464264°N 3.281121°W

Downs
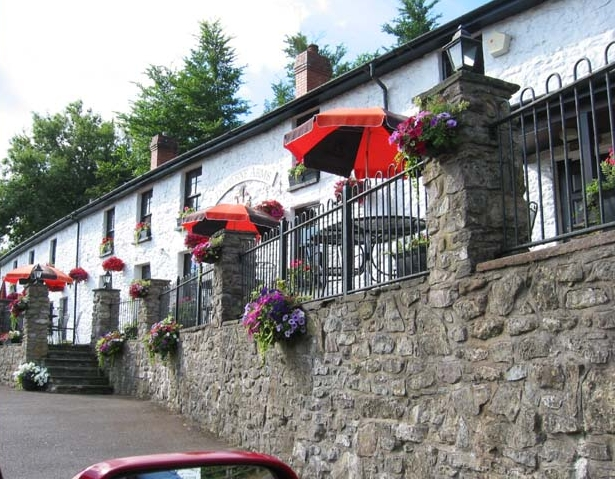
- The Traherne Arms

- Location within the Vale of Glamorgan
- Principal area: Vale of Glamorgan
- Preserved county: South Glamorgan
- Country: Wales
- Sovereign state: United Kingdom
- Postcode district: CF
- Police: South Wales
- Fire: South Wales
- Ambulance: Welsh
- UK Parliament: Vale of Glamorgan
- Senedd Cymru – Welsh Parliament: Vale of Glamorgan

Downs is a hamlet in the Vale of Glamorgan near the county border with the City of Cardiff. It lies just off the A48 road along a road called Grant's Field, just west of Culverhouse Cross and just south of the historical estate of Coedarhydyglyn. The village of St. Nicholas, Vale of Glamorgan lies to the west. The Traherne Arms lies along the main road near the village and, being near the top of The Tumble hill above Culverhouse Cross, has panoramic views of the Welsh capital of Cardiff.

The houses known as Grants Fields took their name from Edgar Grant, who rented the land prior to the homes being built. Edgar was from Dyffryn, moving to The Downs when he married.

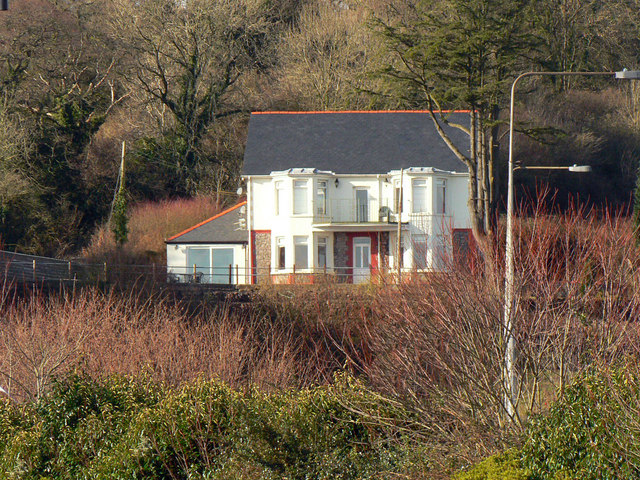
House overlooking the A48 in the lower part of Downs just off Culverhouse Cross
