= Innerwick Castle =

Ruined castle in East Lothian, Scotland

Coordinates: 55°57′20.21″N 2°25′33.51″W

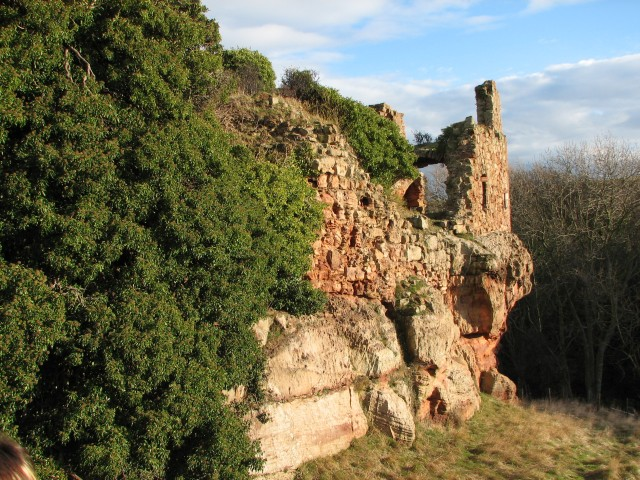
Innerwick Castle

Innerwick Castle is a ruined castle in East Lothian, Scotland, near the village of Innerwick, 5 miles (8.0 km) from Dunbar, on the Thornton Burn, and overlooking Thornton Glen.

== History ==
The castle, built in the 14th century on "the edge of a precipitous glen", was a stronghold of the Stewarts and of the Hamilton family.

It was besieged in 1406 by Robert Stewart, Duke of Albany to expel the forces of the Earl of Northumberland. Several timber beams were bought for the assault, perhaps to make a siege engine or effect access.

In November 1542, the English Somerset Herald, Thomas Trahern was murdered near Dunbar and his companion Henry Ray, Berwick Pursuivant found a refuge at Innerwick Castle. Sir James Hamilton of Innerwick and twenty of his servants recovered the body of the English herald and buried him at Dunbar church, and he sent a surgeon to look after the Trahern's servant or "boy".

During the war of the Rough Wooing, James Hamilton of Innerwick was captured by the English and held for ransom by Ralph Eure. His son, Alexander Hamilton, obtained an English prisoner Robert Constable, and hoped to arrange an exchange of prisoners in March 1545. The castle, which had been extended several times, was captured and destroyed by Edward Seymour, 1st Duke of Somerset in September 1547. English soldiers directed by Peter Meutas managed to access the basement and set the castle on fire.

Both Innerwick and nearby Thornton castles were of strategic importance for guarding routes from the south. Mary of Guise mentioned the house of "Andreouyque" in a letter of 27 April 1560 concerning soldiers from Dunbar Castle, when French forces were fighting the English at the siege of Leith.

In May 1568 Alexander Hamilton of Innerwick signed the bond made at Hamilton to support Mary, Queen of Scots, and came "in arrayed battle" to the battle of Langside, where her forces were defeated by Regent Moray. He was captured.

In April 1584 the laird of Innerwick was commanded to surrender the castle to the crown. The keepers of Tantallon and Fast Castle received the same instruction.

In the 1590s Alexander Hamilton, laird of Innerwick, employed the Edinburgh tailor Patrick Nimmo, who kept a record of the clothes he made for the laird, his wife Christian, (a daughter of Thomas Hamilton of Priestfield), and their sons and daughters. Elspeth Hamilton had a gown of shot or changing silk "burret" with stuffed sleeves, Jean had winter gowns of woollen fabrics. His son, Alexander Hamilton of Fenton, had a purple fustian doublet and breeches with a green cloak and a Spanish felt hat in 1599.

David Calderwood mentions Margaret Whitelaw, Lady of Innerwick, who divorced Alexander Hamilton of Innerwick and remarried to Sir John Ker of Littledean, and died in 1627. She died in torment, and was said to have practised witchcraft and consulted with witches.

A later owner James Maxwell of Innerwick became Earl of Dirleton, and the land around the castle was sold to the Nisbets in 1663.

In the 17th century Innerwick Castle was in good enough repair that it was used as a base, along with Dirleton and Tantallon, by the Covenanters to harass Oliver Cromwell’s lines of communication during the Wars of the Three Kingdoms.

== Location and access ==
Innerwick Castle stands within the Barony of Innerwick. The most recent Baron of Innerwick was Colonel Victor Charles Vereker Cowley of Crowhill (1918–2008). Currently, Thornton Glen is part of the Crowhill Estate and is managed by the Scottish Wildlife Trust. The glen is considered important for the presence of ferns that are rare in Scotland. The remains of the castle are on top of a crag which is popular with climbers.
