= Coed Hills =

Coordinates: 51°45′7″N 3°40′15″W

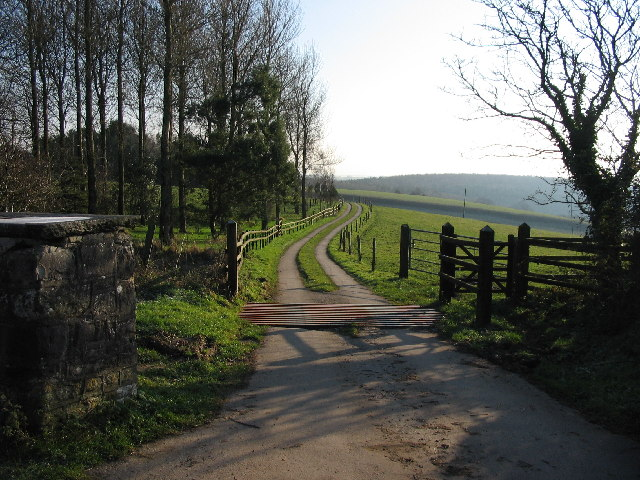
Entrance to Coed Hills farm

Coed Hills Rural Artspace is a sustainable community close to the village of St Hilary in the Vale of Glamorgan, Wales, approximately 8 miles (13 km) west of Cardiff.

Set in 180 acres (0.73 km^{2}) of woodland and pasture, the Artspace was established in 1997 and is designed following principles of low impact development, aiming to combine creativity with sustainability. There is an 8-acre market garden and a 2-acre forest garden, and the site is a venue for conferences, courses, weddings and events. The site is seasonally open to visitors and guided tours, and provides an educational resource via workshops that are run for schools, colleges and groups.

== See also ==
- Diggers and Dreamers
- Intentional community
