= John Montgomery Traherne =

Anglican priest and antiquary (1788–1860)

John Montgomery Traherne, FRS, FSA, FGS, FLS (5 October 1788 – 5 February 1860) was a Welsh Anglican priest, antiquarian, magistrate and Deputy Lieutenant of County of Glamorgan. His best known work is Historical Notices of Sir Matthew Craddock of Swansea.

== Early years ==
The only son of Llewelyn Traherne, High Sheriff of Glamorgan, he was born at Coedarhydyglyn in 1788, near what is now Culverhouse Cross in western Cardiff. His mother was Charlotte (died 1791), the daughter of John Edmonds, Esq. of St Hilary. He had three sisters: Charlotte-Frances, Maria-Eleanor, Louisa. In 1799, during his father's lifetime, Traherne was virtually adopted by his great-aunt, Mrs. John Llewellin, who covered the cost of his education at private schools and tutors until he entered Oriel College, Oxford, in April 1807. At Oxford, he was taught by Edward Copleston, then tutor and later head of the College, who subsequently became Bishop of Llandaff. While a student, Traherne met Rev. Thomas Rackett (1757–1841), Rector of Spetisbury and Charlton, Co. Dorset. Through Rackett, Traherne developed an interest for topographical and antiquarian studies and was introduced to the literary and scientific circles of London. Traherne obtained his B.A. degree in 1810 and M.A. in 1813.

== Career ==
He was ordained deacon in 1812, and priest in 1813, both times by Richard Beadon, Bishop of Bath and Wells. From 1817 to 1820, he engaged in politics in Glamorgan while serving as a magistrate. From 1844 to 1851, he served as Chancellor of the Diocese of Llandaff and the Llandaff Cathedral. He was a Fellow of the Royal Society, Society of Antiquaries of London, Linnean Society of London, and the Geological Society of London. Additionally, he was an Honorary Member of the Society of Antiquaries of Newcastle upon Tyne, and the Royal Society of Antiquaries of Copenhagen. Like his wife, Traherne was deeply committed to history and literature. Under various pseudonyms, he authored works on local and South Welsh history, with his best-known publication being Historical Notices of Sir Matthew Craddock of Swansea. He also frequently contributed to "Archaeologia" and other similar journals.

== Personal life ==
On inheriting his family estate in 1823, he demolished the old house at Coedarhydyglyn and erected a Regency villa. He also arranged for the 1838 restoration of the St. Georges-super-Ely village church. Traherne also became lord of the manor and church of St Hilary; his mother's family had purchased the manor in 1758.

On 23 April 1830, Traherne married Charlotte-Louisa, third daughter of Thomas Mansel Talbot of Margam, and sister of Christopher Rice Mansel Talbot, Lord-Lieutenant and M.P. for the County of Glamorgan. Traherne died at Coedarhydyglyn in 1860, childless. The 123 volumes of the Traherne-Mansel Franklen Manuscripts, which he compiled over the years, are now in the possession of the National Archives of Wales.

== Partial works ==
- Historical notices of sir Matthew Cradock, knt, (1840)
- Stradling correspondence: a series of letters written in the reign of Queen Elizabeth, with notices of the family of Stradling of St. Donat's Castle, Co. Glamorgan, (1840)
