= Castellau =

Coordinates: 51.570259°N 3.370386°W

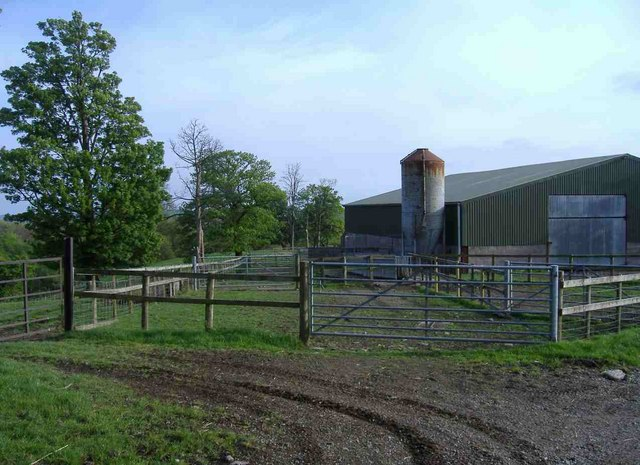

- Location within Rhondda Cynon Taf
- Community: Llantrisant
- Principal area: Rhondda Cynon Taf
- Preserved county: Mid Glamorgan
- Country: Wales
- Sovereign state: United Kingdom
- Post town: PONTYCLUN
- Postcode district: CF72
- Dialling code: 01443
- Police: South Wales
- Fire: South Wales
- Ambulance: Welsh
- UK Parliament: Pontypridd
- Senedd Cymru – Welsh Parliament: Pontypridd, South Wales Central Electoral Region

Castellau ("fortifications"; alternate: Castella) is a hamlet, with a country house of the same name in the community of Llantrisant, in the county borough of Rhondda Cynon Taf, South Wales. Historically, it lies within the parish of Llantrisant, just north-west of Beddau. It is connected with the history of the Trahernes. In 1988, Ysgol Castellau became the first Welsh medium education school to open in the southeast within new buildings.

== Geography ==
After crossing the Rhondda, the road rises out of the valley in a southerly direction nearly due south to Castellau. Castellau is located less than a mile north-west of Beddau. A forge was situated in a small valley, Darren Ddeusant, extending upwards by the mansion, Castellau House, into the hills to the north of Llantrisant. This hamlet contains some coal works, part of the produce of which is shipped for Ireland.

== History ==
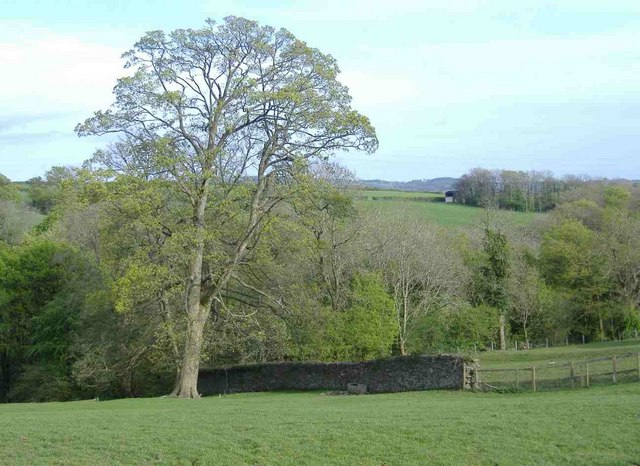
Scenery

While the name imports a fortified place, nothing is known of its history. It might have formed an outpost to the castle of Llantrisant. The Traherne family lived for several centuries at Castellau. They are descended through Sir George Herbert of Swansea, son of Sir Richard Herbert. It was later owned by a Mrs. Smith.

== Castellau ==
Built in the late Classical Regency style, Castellau probably predates 1807. The large two-storeyed house is a remodel from a 17th-century three-unit house. The interior has a semicircular staircase, square hall, bow-ended dining room, Ionic columns, marble chimneypiece, cast iron balustrade. The white house's exterior features bowed ends, a six-bay facade, central doorway, slate roof, cantilevered eaves, and a cast iron veranda.

== Chapel ==
Chapel Castellau Independent was built in 1842 or 1843 and a renovation occurred in 1877. It was not used only as a place of worship. In 1851, Joshua Evans of Cymmar was its minister while in 1865, Henry Oliver served as minister. The chapel is located 1 mile (1.6 km) south of the house; featuring angled pinnacles and transomed lancets, the interior has galleries on three sides and a polygonal pulpit.
