= Old Beaupre Castle =

Ruined medieval fortified manor house in Llanfair, Wales

Coordinates: 51.43873°N 3.42729°W

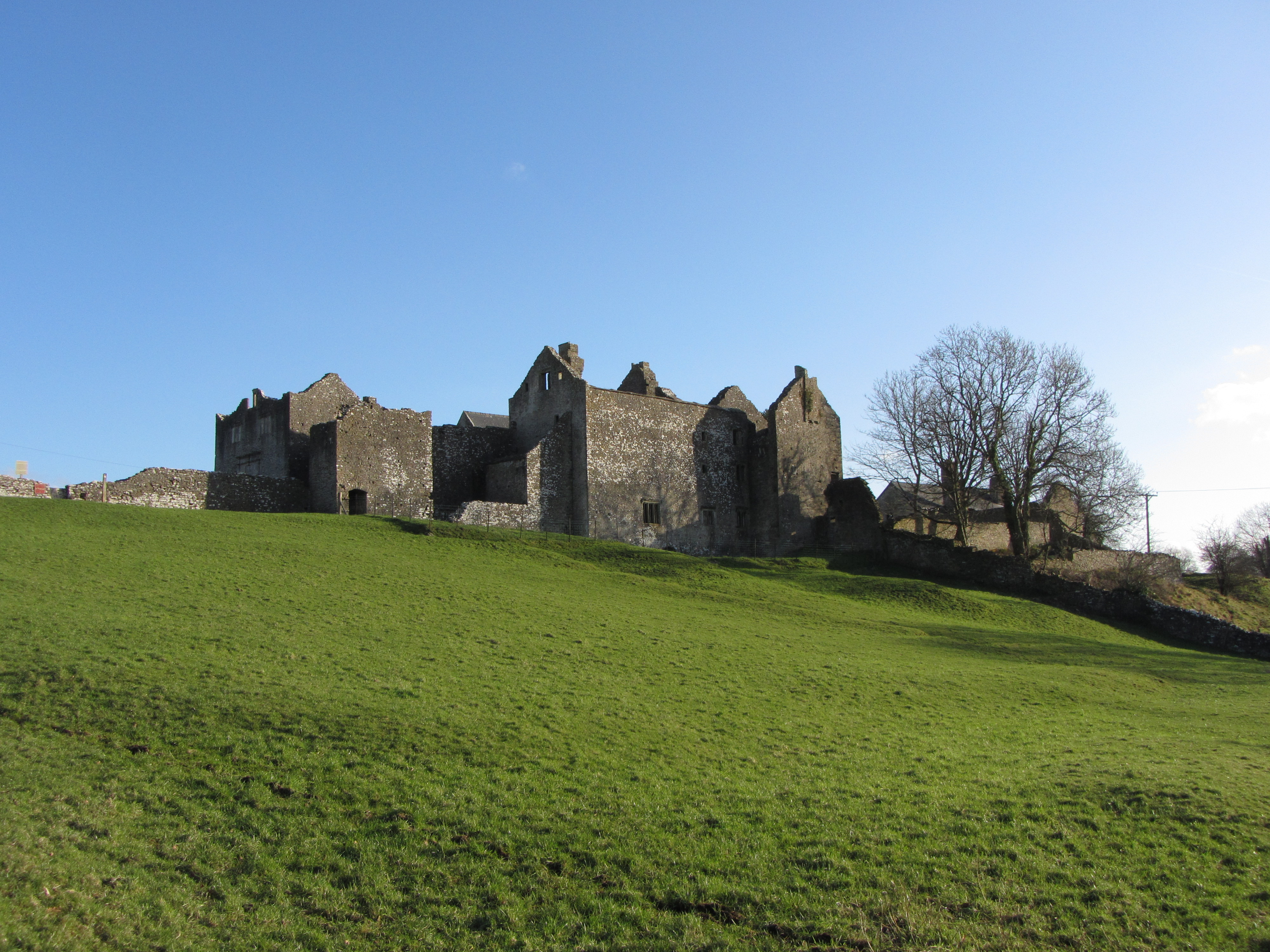
Old Beaupre Castle from the northwest

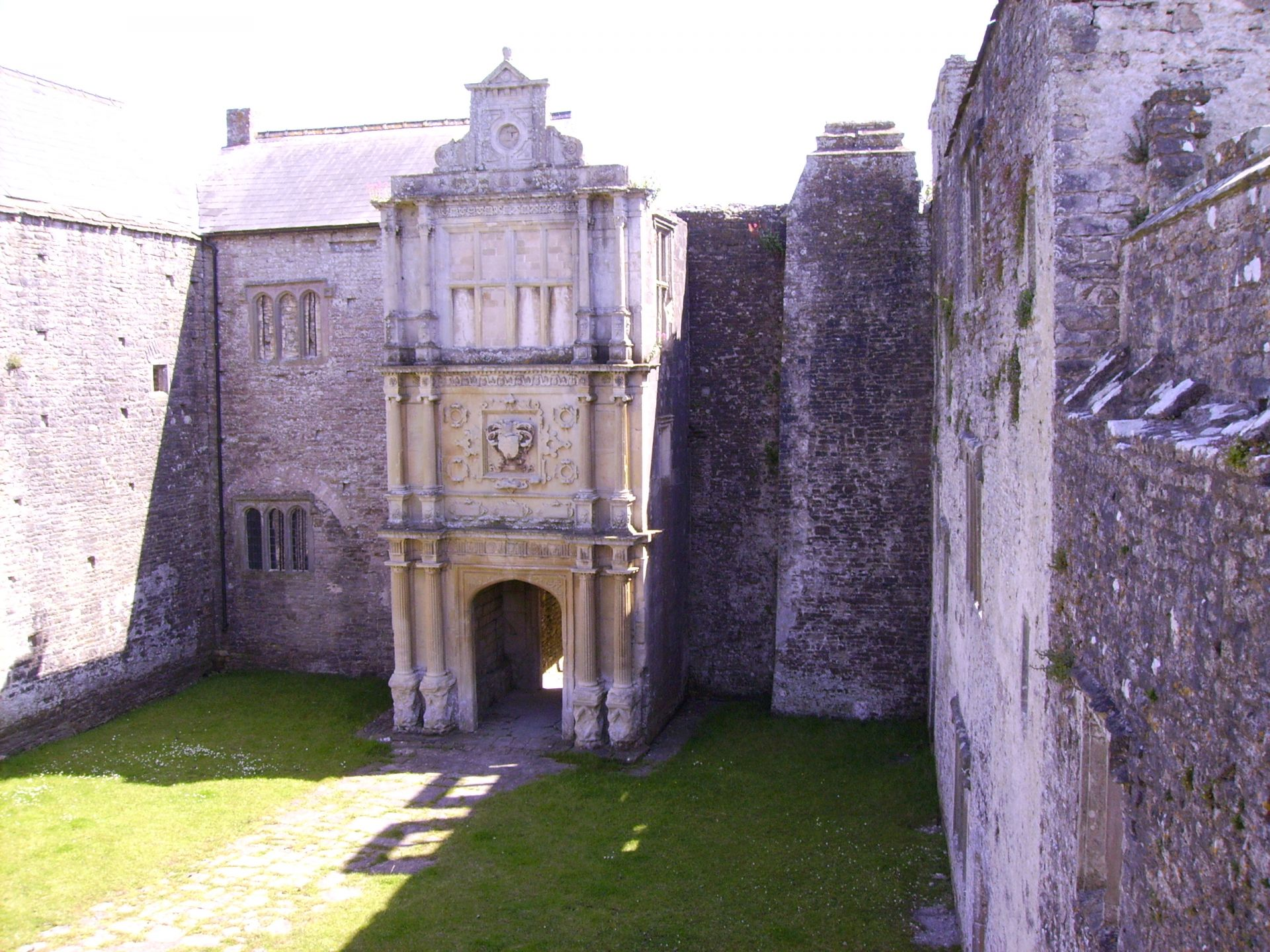
Inner courtyard and Renaissance porch

Old Beaupre Castle (Welsh: Hen Gastell y Bewpyr; also known as Beaupre Castle, Old Beaupre Manor, or simply Beaupre) is a ruined medieval fortified manor house located in the community of Llanfair, outside Cowbridge in Wales. It is known in historic documents under the names Beawpire, Bewerpere, Bewpyr and Y Bewpur. It is a Grade I listed building and is under the care of Cadw. It can be visited free of charge all year round by members of the public. The gardens are designated Grade II on the Cadw/ICOMOS Register of Parks and Gardens of Special Historic Interest in Wales.

== History ==
Although called Old Beaupre Castle the structure is seen as a fortified manor house. The original house was an L-shaped building, now located within the inner courtyard, built c. 1300, and from this period until the 18th century it was owned by the Basset family. During the 16th century intensive remodelling was undertaken, started by Sir Rice Mansel, continued by William Basset and completed by William's son, Richard. This additional work added the impressive outer gatehouse, completed in 1586 and a three-storeyed Renaissance porch, completed 1600, along with the buildings around the middle court. The buildings on the west side of the middle court, now roofless, provided luxurious living accommodation with large windows, handsome fireplaces, a fine stone stairway, and numerous privies connected to a drain along which water still flows.

After the 16th-century alterations little work was carried out on Beaupre, and after the English Civil War the Basset family fortunes went into decline. At the beginning of the 18th century, the Basset inheritance eventually passed to the Jones family. The Jones family decided not to settle in Beaupre Castle and chose to use the smaller and more convenient mansion of New Beaupre. Beaupre was sold in 1709, and by that time it was in a state of disrepair, with only part of it still habitable. Nevertheless, there is some evidence that it continued to be at least partly occupied as various fireplaces and windows were blocked up, presumably to reduce the taxes payable. The southeastern block continues to be occupied up to the present time as a farmhouse and has a separate listing on the historic buildings register. The courtyard of the medieval castle was used in 2009 to film a battle for the Movie 'Ironclad'.

== The site ==
This mansion dates from the sixteenth or seventeenth century but is built on remnants of a building dating from c. 1300. It occupies a site about 100 metres (330 ft) long and 25 to 56 metres (82 to 184 ft) wide, orientated in a north/south direction. The building is arranged around three courts, the fine gatehouse being on the south side connecting the outer to the middle court. The oldest part of the building is the south block where the original gatehouse can be seen to the left of the later one; this older entrance has a Tudor window inserted into the blocked arch.

Beaupre Castle has few outwardly looking windows and appears like a series of fortified barns. The main entrance is via the gatehouse reached via a low walled outer courtyard. The gatehouse is a three storey structure surrounded by a curtain wall. The inner porch stands out from the rest of the courtyard with smooth ashlar stonework in comparison to the rough local stonework surrounding it. The porch, designed by Richard Twrch, consists of varying architectural styles including a Tudor arch, strapwork decoration and three tiers of flanked columns. The columns rise in ascending order from Doric to Ionic to Corinthian and the second tier bears the Basset family heraldic set on panels. Through the entrance porch is the fourteenth century great hall, now without a roof. The windows were probably enlarged in the sixteenth century but the fine, heraldic fireplace dates back to the fourteenth century.

The range on the east side of the middle court has no roof and is four storeys high. Its southern elevation has a doorway at ground level on either end, three sets of four-light windows towards the right end and six pairs of two-light windows at the left end. The range on the west side of the middle court is three storeys high, has no floor or roof and dates from about 1540. Its northern elevation has three sets of four-light mullioned windows which are centrally placed.

== Visitor information ==
Old Beaupre Castle is a scheduled monument, a Grade I listed building, listed because it is a fine example of a medieval manor house, modified during the Tudor period, and its carved Renaissance porch is particularly impressive. The grounds are designated Grade II on the Cadw/ICOMOS Register of Parks and Gardens of Special Historic Interest in Wales. Old Beaupre Castle is under the care of Cadw. The property is open all year round free of charge. A small car park is available 275 yards (250 metres) away and visitors approach the property across pastureland, with stiles and a kissing gate.

== See also ==
- List of castles in Wales

== Literature ==
- RCAHMW, (1981), Glamorgan: The Greater Houses HMSO, 46–63, pls 1–3. ills. ISBN 0117007544
