= Thomas Trahern =

English officer of arms

Thomas Trahern (died 25 November 1542) was Somerset Herald, an English officer of arms. His murder in Scotland, which may have been related to the Pilgrimage of Grace rebellion, was a setback to Anglo-Scottish relations.

== Somerset Herald ==
Trahern was made Somerset Herald in 1536. One of his early missions was to interview Thomas Darcy, who was implicated in the pro-Catholic rebellion called the Pilgrimage of Grace. He met Darcy at Templehurst, near Selby on 14 November 1536 accompanied by Henry Ray, Berwick Pursuivant. Though this meeting was conciliatory, Darcy was subsequently executed. With the other heralds and pursuivants, Trahern attended the funeral of Jane Seymour on Monday 12 November 1537. In August 1538 he was at the assize at York that condemned Thomas Millar or Milner, former Lancaster Herald. Millar's crime was his submission to Robert Aske, leader of the Pilgrimage of Grace, at Pontefract on 13 October 1536.

== Death and legacy ==
On 12 November 1542, the Earl of Hertford sent Trahern to James V of Scotland from Sir Robert Tyrwhitt's house at Kettleby in Lincolnshire. Trahern was killed near Dunbar while returning to England from Edinburgh on 25 November 1542. He was accompanied by Henry Ray and the Scottish Dingwall Pursuivant. Although Ray stated the murderers were three English fugitives, John Prestman, William Leech of Fulletby, bailiff of Louth, and his brother Edward, veterans of the Pilgrimage of Grace, Henry VIII treated his death in Scotland as a diplomatic incident and blamed James V of Scotland. Henry Ray provided a statement;

And then there came riding two men of horsbakk, and oon on fote with them, and overrode me the said Barwik and Scottishe pursivaunte, and ranne to Somersett, withoute speaking anye oon worde unto hyme. And oon of thies strange men ranne the said Somersett thorowe with a launce staff by hynd him, and oon other did strike hym to the harte with a dagger, and the thirde stroke the said Somersettis boye on the face with his sword.

Trahern was buried in the parish church of Dunbar by Sir James Hamilton of Innerwick. Cardinal David Beaton sent a surgeon from Haddington to Dunbar to heal the wounds of the servant or "boy".

Prestman and Leech sought sanctuary, but were imprisoned in Edinburgh Castle and on 28 February 1543 sent to London for execution. William Leech was hanged at Tyburn on 8 May 1543, and his two companions were executed on 12 June. A later 16th-century English chronicle suggested that the distress caused by Trahern's murder contributed to the final illness of James V of Scotland.

Thomas Traherne's own coat of arms, including a chevron and three black herons, shows that he was a member of a Glamorgan family.
