= Christian laying on of hands =

Christian method of invoking the Holy Spirit

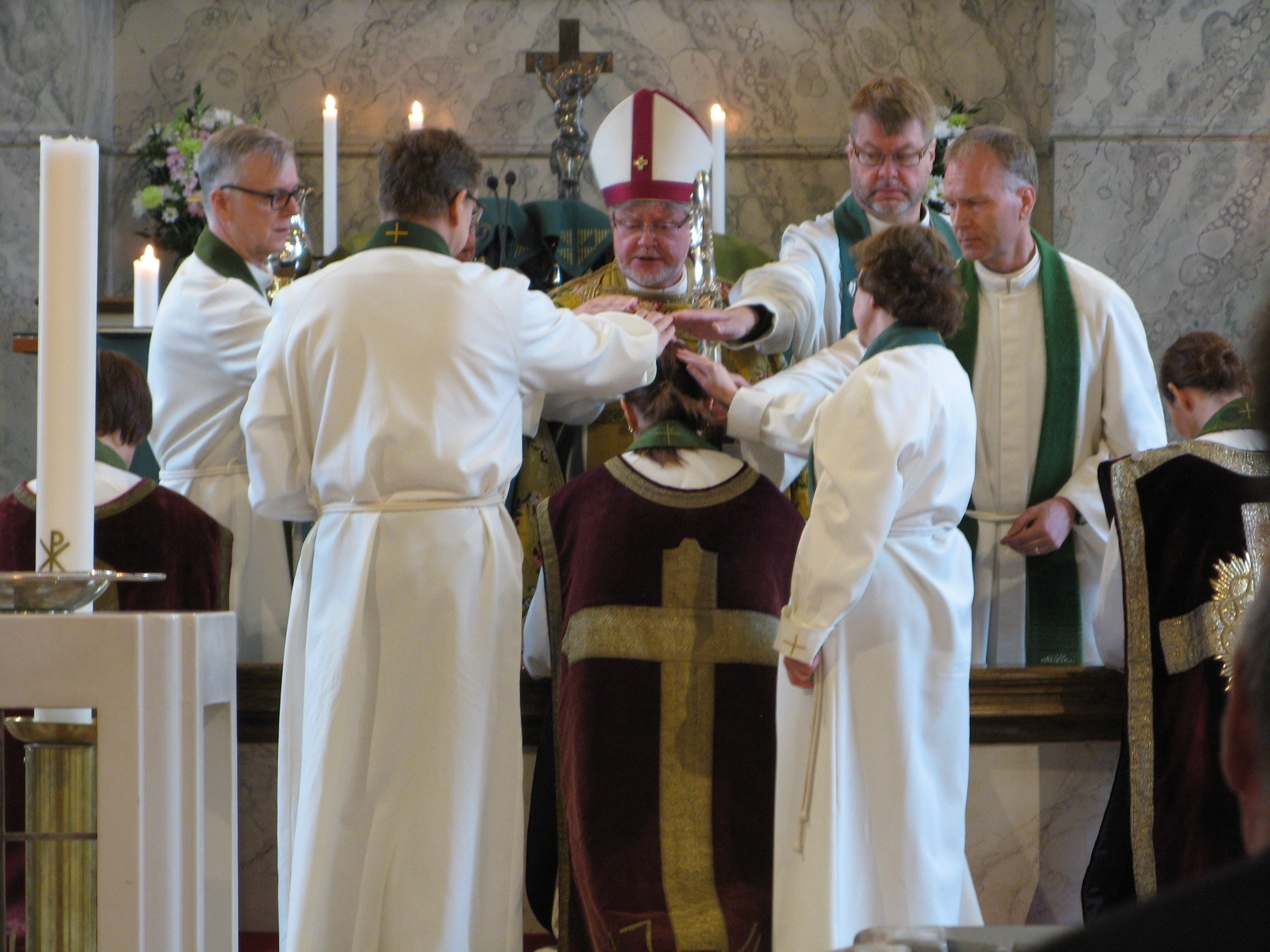
Laying on of hands Finnish Lutheran ordination in Oulu

In Christianity, the laying on of hands (Greek: cheirotonia – χειροτονία, literally, "laying-on of hands") is both a symbolic and formal method of invoking the Holy Spirit primarily during baptisms and confirmations, healing services, blessings, and ordination of priests, ministers, elders, deacons, and other church officers, along with a variety of other church sacraments and holy ceremonies.

In the New Testament the laying on of hands was associated with Christ healing the sick (Luke 4:40) and after his ascension, the receiving of the Holy Spirit (See Acts 8:14–19). Initially the Apostles laid hands on new believers as well as believers. (See Acts 6:5–6). In the early church, the practice continued and is still used in a wide variety of church ceremonies, such as during confirmation.

== Eastern Christianity ==
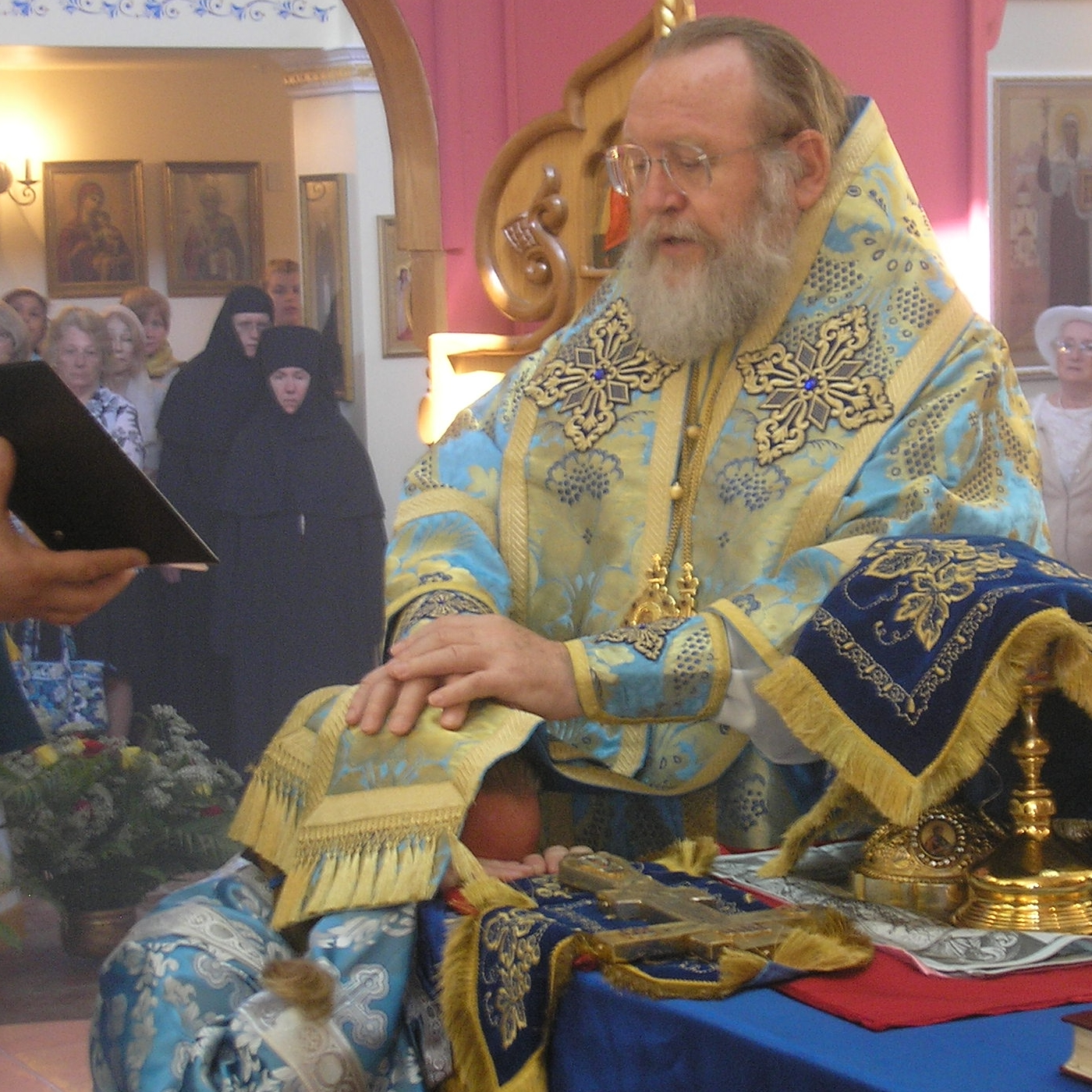
Ordination of an Eastern Orthodox priest. The deacon being ordained is kneeling at the south west corner of the holy table and the bishop places his omophorion and right hand on the deacon's head and his left hand over his right and is reading the laying on of hands.

In Eastern Christianity, laying on of hands is used for the ordination (called cheirotonia) of the higher clergy (bishops, priests and deacons) which is distinguished from the blessing (called cheirothesia) of the lower clergy (taper bearers, readers and subdeacons) as well as making an abbot or abbess or promoting a deacon to archdeacon, etc. Priests and deacons receive the laying on of hands by a single bishop, bishops are consecrated by three or more bishops.

The chrism (Greek: myron) which is used at chrismation and the anointing of sovereigns is believed to contain chrism which the Apostles blessed and laid their hands on, the former since some existing chrism is poured into newly consecrated chrism and the latter is stated in the prayer used in the consecration of chrism. This is consecrated and added to as needed by the primates of the autocephalous churches, and is dispersed to priests for their use in administering the sacred mysteries (sacraments). In the Eastern Christian Tradition, anointing with the chrism is the equivalent of laying on of hands. The presentation of this chrism which has received the laying on of hands, together with an antimension is the manner in which a bishop bestows faculties upon a priest under his omophorion (i.e., under his authority).

The laying on of hands is also performed at the end of the sacrament of unction. This mystery should be performed by seven priests six of whom lay their hands on a Gospel Book which has been placed over the head of the one being anointed, while the senior priest reads a prayer.

== Catholicism ==
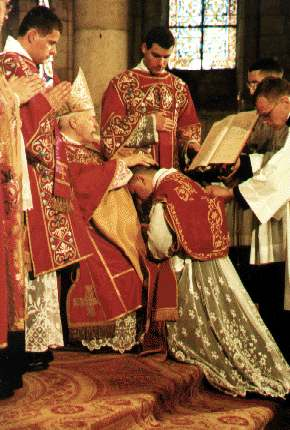
At priestly ordination, the Catholic bishop imposes hands upon the deacon for ordination to the priesthood.

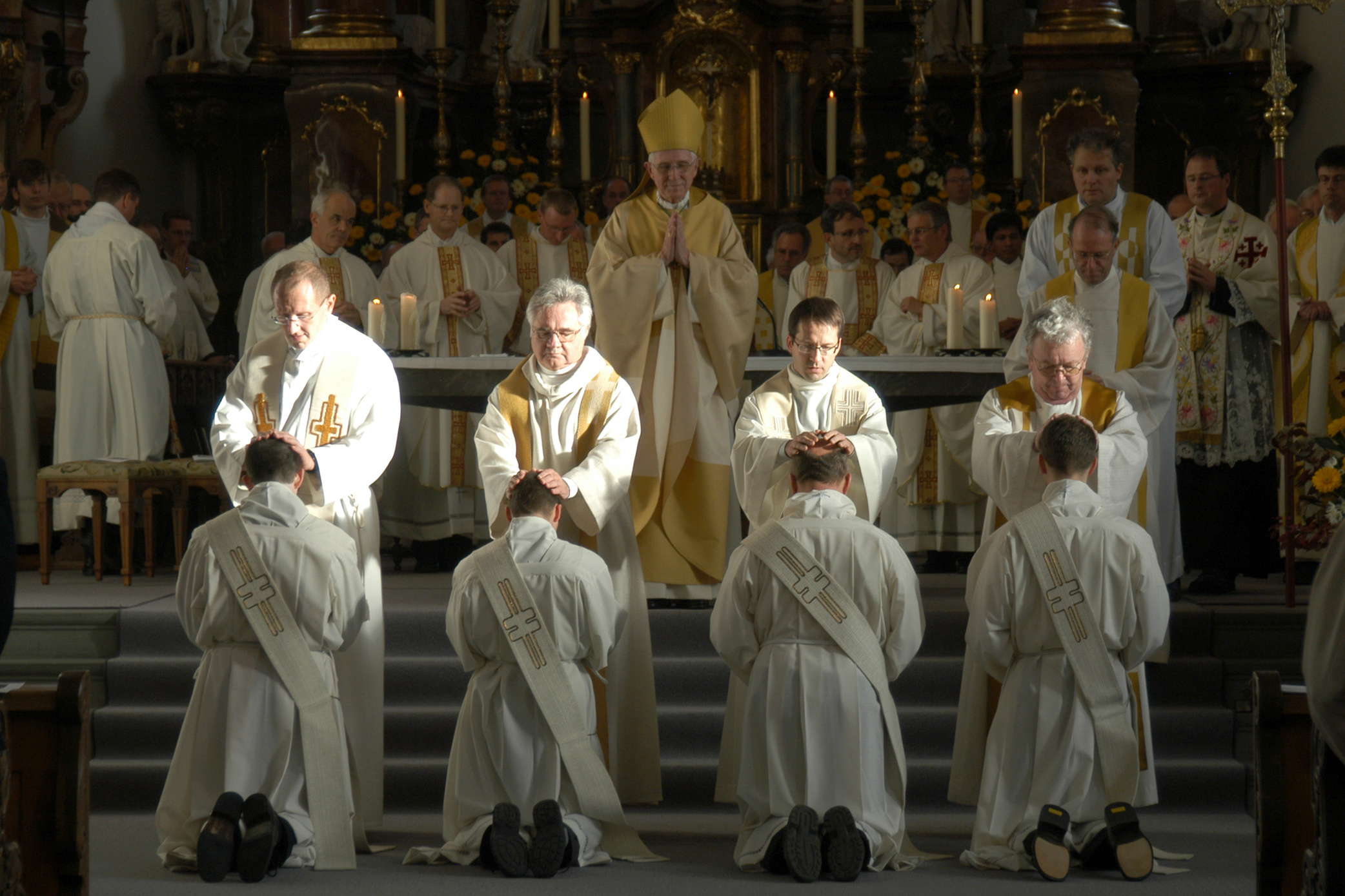
During the rite of ordination, after the bishop the priests present lay their hands on the ordinands

In the Catholic Church, the laying on of hands is performed in the sacrament of Holy Orders and is the means by which one is included in one of the three major orders: bishop, priest, or deacon. Ordination can be administered only by a bishop in Apostolic Succession (valid), and should only be accomplished by a bishop who is properly authorized by the Holy See (licit). The laying on of hands to the priesthood enables a person so ordained to act in persona Christi; i.e., "in the person of Christ." Ordination enables a priest to validly celebrate the Eucharist and administer all the sacraments with the sole exception of ordination which is reserved exclusively to a bishop.

The sacrament of Confirmation is "the special outpouring of the Holy Spirit as once granted to the apostles on the day of Pentecost", and "brings an increase and deepening of baptismal grace." In the Latin Church, the sacrament is customarily conferred only on persons old enough to understand it, and the ordinary minister of Confirmation is a bishop. Only for a serious reason may the diocesan bishop delegate a priest to administer the sacrament (canon 884 of the Code of Canon Law). However, a priest may by law confer the sacrament, if he baptizes someone who is no longer an infant or admits a person already baptized to full communion, or if the person (adult or child) to be confirmed is in danger of death (canon 883).

== Anglicanism ==
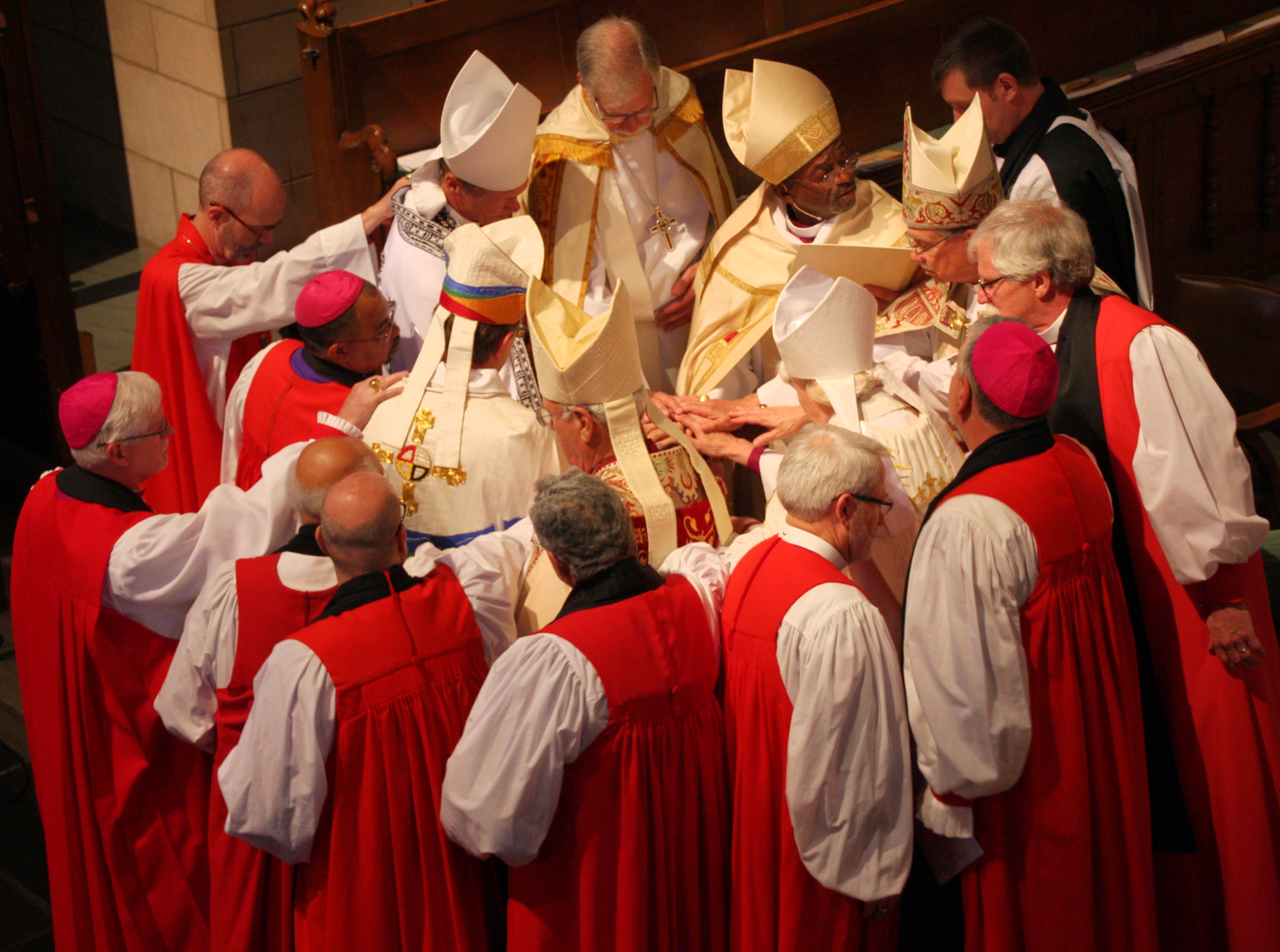
Consecration of a bishop in the US Episcopal Church

Laying on of hands is part of Anglican confirmation, anointing of the sick, and other parts of liturgy and pastoral offices. The Guild of St Raphael, founded in 1915, is an organization within the Anglican church specifically dedicated to promoting, supporting and practicing Christ's ministry of healing through the laying on of hands as an integral part of the Church. The laying on of hands is also performed in the sacrament of Holy Orders and is the means by which one is included in one of the three ordained orders of the church: bishop, priest, or deacon. Ordination can be administered only by a bishop in Apostolic Succession.

== Pentecostalism ==
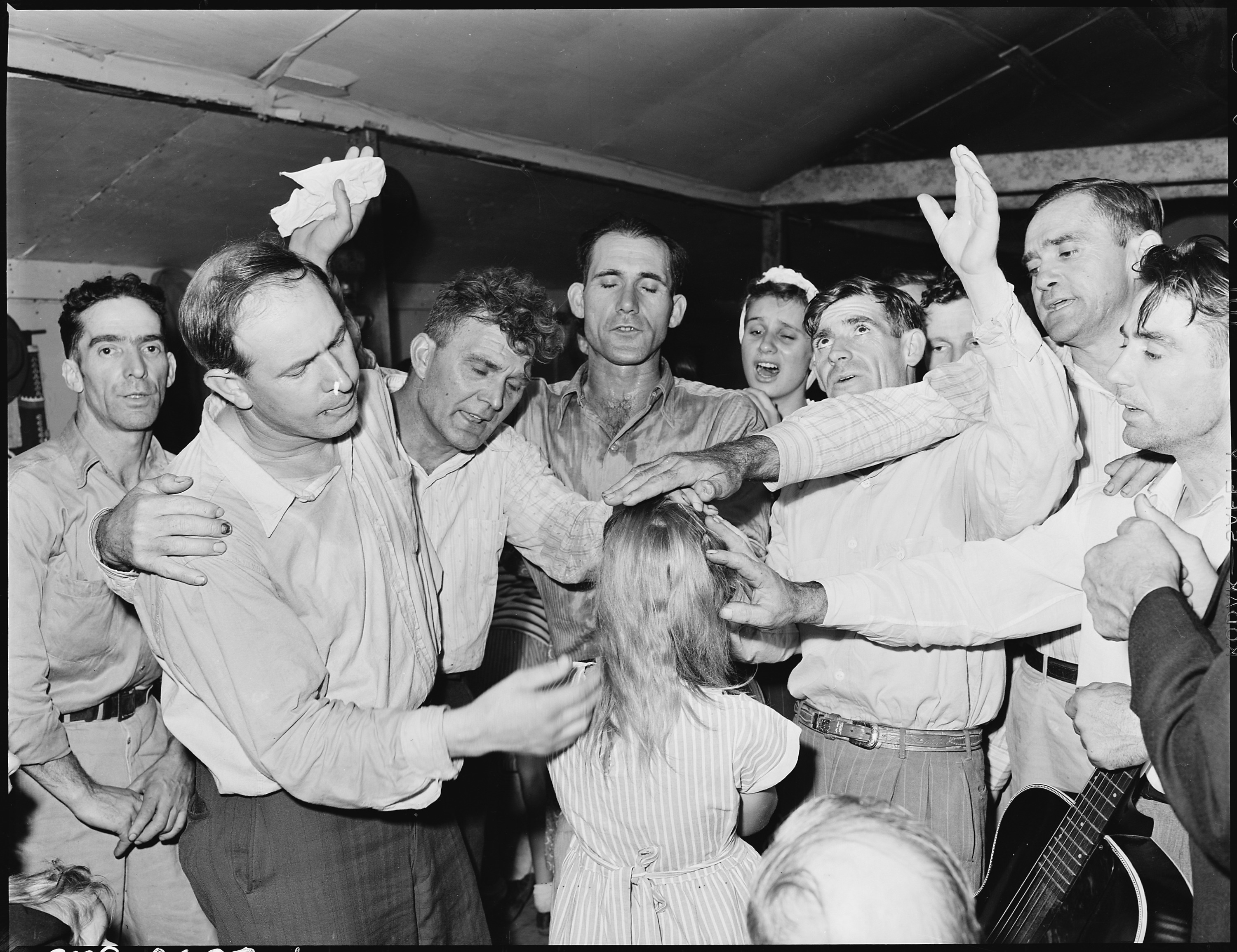
Members of the Pentecostal Church of God of Lejunior, Kentucky, lay hands on a girl during prayer in 1946.

Pentecostal Christians practice the laying on of hands as part of prayer for divine healing and the anointing of the sick. While laying on of hands is not required for healing, Pentecostals believe that, in addition to its biblical origins, the act of touching is an encouragement to faith.

Australian Prime Minister Scott Morrison admitted to secretly practicing laying on of hands when meeting victims of natural disasters.

== Baptists ==
In Baptist churches, the laying on of hands takes place after a believer's baptism. This is one of the two points which was added in the 1689 Baptist Confession of Faith in 1742.

In adherence to strict autonomy and autocephalocy, the Southern Baptist Church does not officially prescribe, reject, or affirm the practice of laying on of hands. Each church is expected to decide the matter for itself between its clergy and its congregation. In regards to ordination, the laying of hands is representative of authorizing, permitting, and recognizing the calling of the recipient to the clergy.

Southern Baptist Christians employ the laying on of hands during the ordination of clergymen (such as deacons, assistant, and senior pastors) as well as situations of calling for divine healing.

The laying of hands generally encompasses three different variations. Some, all, or none of these are employed at each church, based on each congregation's preferences.

- The primary use of laying of hands is ordination. When a man is accepted to join the clergy, either as a deacon or a pastor (etc.), he is brought before the altar and prayed over by either the sitting pastor or a senior deacon. Each previously ordained, former or current, clergyman of any rank then line up and lay their hands upon the new clergyman, one at a time, and pray over him.
- The second usage of the laying of hands is in faith healing and in commissioning, which itself works in two forms. Anointing of the sick is a practice explicitly authorized in the Bible and is performed by the clergy. In circumstances where all secular medical options have been exhausted (including but not limited to the dying), or treatment has stalled, or the diagnosis is unknown, the clergy are called to the recipient's house, where they anoint the head of the infirm with oil and proceed to lay their hands upon them, simultaneously, and pray over them. The Baptist Church does not teach that neither physical healing nor medical guidance to doctors is invoked by or within the anointing. Therefore, God may or may not grant physical healing to the sick in spite of the act. The healing conferred by anointing is thus a spiritual event that may not result in physical recovery.
- The third and final usage is used to commission certain parties of missionaries going abroad for an extended period of time. This act, performed by the laity and clergy at the same time, involves the entire congregation rising and gathering around the parties, laying their hands upon the recipient 's body, or on the bodies of those in front of them as a chain, as the clergy (normally the pastor) pray over them. This action can also be used as an invocation of medical guidance or, in terminal situations, as faith healing.

Like baptism and the administration of the Lord's Supper (the Eucharist), Southern Baptists believe the laying of hands to be a solely ceremonial action which, while still holy and important, does not empower or invoke the specific task it is used to call for. In ordination, the laying of hands is not empowering the individual to serve in the clergy, but to authorize and recognize his spiritual gifts and his calling to do so. In healing, it is to ascribe urgency and importance, not to invoke actual healing. Southern Baptists do not believe that God's power can be invoked by man, but that the decision to heal or not heal is God's will alone.

== Catharism ==
A Cathar Perfect, the highest initiate in the Cathar hierarchy after spending time as a Listener and then Believer, had to undergo a rigorous training of three years before being inducted as a member of the spiritual elite of the now defunct religious movement. This took place during a ceremony in which various Scriptural extracts were quoted, including, most particularly, the opening verses of the Gospel of John. The ceremony was completed by a ritual laying on of hands, also known as Manisola, as the candidate vowed to abjure the world and accept the Holy Spirit. At this point, the Perfecti believed, the Holy Spirit was able to descend and dwell within the new Perfect — hence the austere lifestyle needed to provide a pure dwelling place for the Spirit. Once in this state of housing the Holy Spirit within themselves, the Perfect were believed to have become "trans-material" or semi-angelic, not yet released from the confines of the body but containing within them an enhanced spirituality which linked them to God even in this world, as expressed in the Gospel of Luke. The Cathars were decimated and annihilated as a sect during the Albigensian Crusade.

== Mormonism ==
Along with others in the Latter Day Saint movement, members of the Church of Jesus Christ of Latter-day Saints believe the restoration of Christ's priesthood came about by the laying on of hands by John the Baptist and the resurrected Saint Peter to Joseph Smith and Oliver Cowdery.

The laying on of hands is seen as a necessary part of confirmation and ordination to the Aaronic and Melchizedek priesthoods.

In addition to these confirmations and ordinations, worthy Melchizedek priesthood holders lay their hands on the head of one receiving a blessing of healing, comfort, or counsel.

== See also ==
- Kiss of peace
- Right hand of Christian fellowship
