= Katharine Burr Blodgett Medal and Prize =

Award by the Institute of Physics

- Sponsored by: Institute of Physics
- Country: United Kingdom
- Presented by: Institute of Physics
- Formerly called: Swan Medal and Prize
- Rewards: Gold medal, £1000
- First award: 2008
- Website: https://www.iop.org/about/awards/

The Katharine Burr Blodgett Medal and Prize is a gold medal awarded annually by the Institute of Physics to "recognise contributions to the organisation or application of physics in an industrial or commercial context." The medal is accompanied by a prize of £1000.

== History ==
At its inception in 2008, the award was named the "Business and Innovation Medal". In 2012, it was renamed the "Swan Medal and Prize" in memory of Sir Joseph Swan, a chemist, physicist, and early developer of the incandescent light bulb. Since 2016, the award was renamed again to commemorate Katharine Burr Blodgett, inventor of low-reflectance "invisible" glass (Langmuir–Blodgett film), and the first woman to receive a degree in physics from Cambridge University.

== Medallists ==
The following have been award one of these medals:

=== Katharine Burr Blodgett Medal and Prize ===
- 2026 Russell Cowburn "for sustained discovery and invention across 25 years in nanotechnology, optics and magnetism, leading to the creation of four spin-out companies and multiple patented, mature and field-validated products"
- 2024 Christopher Dorman "for contributions to the laser industry, through executive leadership and community engagement"
- 2022 Andrew James Shields for "pioneering industrial R&D over two decades on quantum communication devices and systems"
- 2021 Brian Corbett for "serial identification and creation of breakthrough innovative photonic device technology solutions"
- 2020 Drew Nelson for "pioneering efforts in commercialising compound semiconductor materials"
- 2019 Chris Hancock for "designing and patenting an electro-surgery platform."
- 2018 Michael Begg and James Ramage, Tesla Engineering, for "the transformation of Tesla Engineering Ltd from a manufacturer of conventional magnets for particle accelerators into a world leader of magnets for high-energy physics, MRI and oncology equipment."
- 2017 Cliff Jones, University of Leeds, for "inventions in the area of liquid crystal displays, and his role in the founding and commercial success of Displaydata."
- 2016 Graeme Malcolm, M Squared Lasers for "his role in founding M Squared Lasers, and his contribution to the design and manufacture of transformative award-winning photonics products."

=== Swan Medal and Prize ===
- 2015 Iain Baikie, KP Technology, for "contributions to the development of Kelvin Probe (KP) method instrumentation."
- 2014 Michael Christopher Payne, University of Cambridge, for "development of computational techniques that have revolutionised materials design and facilitated the industrial application of quantum mechanical simulations."
- 2013 Stuart Parkin, IBM Research for "discoveries of the underlying physics and of novel device architectures that have established the field spintronics."
- 2012 Sir David McMurtry and John Deer, Renishaw plc, for "founding Renishaw plc and leading it to become one of the world’s principal manufacturers of metrology equipment."

=== Business and Innovation Medal ===
- 2011 Graham John Batey, Oxford Instruments, for "sustained outstanding contribution to the application of low temperature physics in an industrial high technology environment."
- 2010 Sir Michael Pepper, University College London, for "translating advances in semiconductor physics into the commercial arena", which included their participation in founding Toshiba Research Europe, Cambridge Laboratory, and TeraView Ltd.
- 2009 Sir Richard Friend & Dr David Fyfe, University of Cambridge, for "guiding the company Cambridge Display Technology (CDT) to a pre-eminent position in the development of light-emitting polymers and in the development of the technology for flat-panel displays and lighting."
- 2008 Donal Denvir, Andor Technology, for "founding Andor Technology, and for leading an R&D programme that has kept the company at the forefront of innovation."

== See also ==
- Institute of Physics Awards
- List of physics awards
- List of awards named after people
