= His Last Vow =

- Sherlock episode
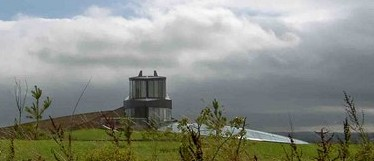
- The fictional "Appledore" inhabited by Magnussen (actually Swinhay House)
- Episode no.: Series 3 Episode 3
- Directed by: Nick Hurran
- Written by: Steven Moffat
- Based on: "The Adventure of Charles Augustus Milverton" by Arthur Conan Doyle
- Cinematography by: Neville Kidd
- Editing by: Yan Miles
- Original air date: 12 January 2014
- Running time: 89 minutes

Guest appearances
- Andrew Scott as Jim Moriarty; Lars Mikkelsen as Charles Augustus Magnussen; Lindsay Duncan as Lady Elizabeth Smallwood; Yasmine Akram as Janine; Tom Brooke as Bill Wiggins; Timothy Carlton as Mr Holmes; Wanda Ventham as Mrs Holmes; Louis Moffat as young Sherlock

Episode chronology
← Previous "The Sign of Three"	Next → "The Abominable Bride"

"His Last Vow" is the third and final episode of the third series of the BBC Television series Sherlock, which follows the modern-day adventures of Sherlock Holmes. The episode was first broadcast on 12 January 2014, on BBC One and Channel One. It was written by Steven Moffat and directed by Nick Hurran with music composed by Michael Price and David Arnold. The episode is a contemporary adaptation of Sir Arthur Conan Doyle's short story "The Adventure of Charles Augustus Milverton".

In the episode, Sherlock Holmes (Benedict Cumberbatch) and John Watson (Martin Freeman) take on a case about stolen letters. This leads the pair into conflict with Charles Augustus Magnussen (Lars Mikkelsen), a media mogul specialising in blackmail whom Sherlock despises. Holmes and Watson try to get Magnussen arrested, but their attempt fails when they confront him at Appledore, Magnussen's home.

On its first broadcast on BBC One, the episode received 11.37 million viewers, a 32.1% audience share. Although this was a drop from "The Sign of Three" and "The Empty Hearse", it became the most tweeted-about single episode of a drama series in the UK. The episode received critical acclaim, and Mikkelsen's performance as Magnussen, in particular, was praised. For their performances in the episode, Cumberbatch and Freeman both won the Emmy Award, for Outstanding Lead Actor in a Miniseries or a Movie and Outstanding Supporting Actor in a Miniseries or a Movie, respectively. Moffat also won the Primetime Emmy Award for Outstanding Writing for a Miniseries, Movie or a Dramatic Special for his work on the episode.

== Plot ==
John Watson, whose wife Mary is now visibly pregnant, finds an unkempt Sherlock Holmes in a crack house under the influence of drugs. John attempts to force him to rehabilitate, but Sherlock insists that he was undercover for a case. Mycroft confronts Sherlock about the drug use and realises that Sherlock is investigating Charles Augustus Magnussen, a newspaper owner who blackmails people. Lady Elizabeth Smallwood has enlisted Sherlock to negotiate the return of stolen letters written by Smallwood's husband. Mycroft warns Sherlock not to go after Magnussen, which Sherlock ignores.

John is also surprised to discover that Sherlock is in a relationship with Mary's bridesmaid, Janine. Sherlock tells John that he is dating her because she is Magnussen's assistant. He uses their relationship to enable him to break into Magnussen's office in London. Inside, Sherlock and John find an incapacitated Janine, and Sherlock happens upon Mary holding Magnussen at gunpoint. Mary shoots Sherlock, who harnesses all his mental powers to stay conscious. He is taken to a hospital, where he flatlines on the operating table. But in his mind palace, Moriarty taunts Sherlock that he's letting John down by dying, which convinces him to revive. When Sherlock wakes up in surgery, he mouths, "Mary". John meets Mary at the hospital and tells her that Sherlock survived. Mary visits the dazed and severely injured Sherlock and warns him not to denounce her. John nonetheless begins to suspect something after discovering that Sherlock moved John's chair in the Baker Street flat back to its usual spot and left a bottle of Mary's perfume on the table next to it.

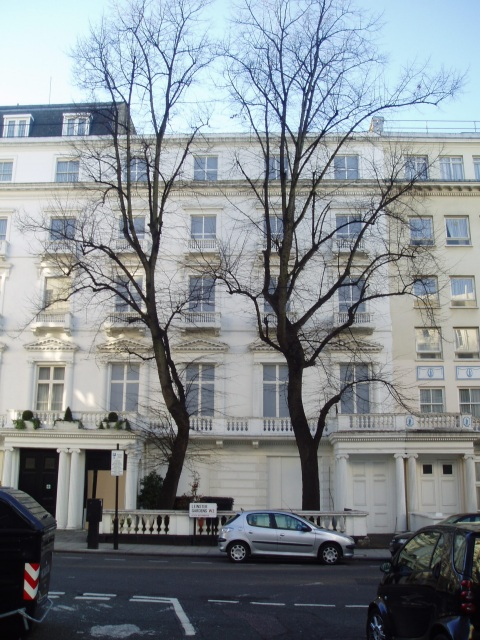
23–24 Leinster Gardens in London, which only exist as a façade, were used in this episode as the location of Sherlock and Mary's meeting.

Sherlock breaks out from the hospital and arranges a meeting with Mary. He tells her he knows she has stolen the identity of a baby who died in 1972. He deduces that she intentionally shot him in a non-lethal spot and, using a ruse, exposes Mary's secret life as an assassin to John.

Back at Baker Street John angrily confronts Mary, asking what he ever did to deserve her. Sherlock tells John that he's observed his addiction to danger, and his attraction to Mary complies with this fact. She tells them some of her past and that Magnussen has information that would send her to prison for the rest of her life. Mary gives John a memory stick marked with the initials A. G. R. A., which she says contains everything about her and would destroy his love for her. Sherlock tells John he can trust Mary because she saved his life by calling an ambulance after shooting him.

After ignoring the memory stick for several months, John burns it without reading it and reconciles with Mary. The couple is spending Christmas with the Holmes brothers at their parents' home, where Sherlock takes the opportunity to drug everyone but John so that they can steal Mycroft's laptop. Sherlock takes a hesitant John to meet Magnussen at his estate, which he believes contains Magnussen's blackmail archive. During their confrontation, Magnussen reveals that he was behind the kidnapping of John, as seen in "The Empty Hearse" and explains that he put pressure on Mary in order to "own" Mycroft via John and Sherlock.

Sherlock offers to trade Magnussen's information on Mary for the state secrets contained in Mycroft's laptop. However, Magnussen is aware that Sherlock is setting him up in a trap. The laptop contains a GPS tracker, and once Mycroft realises it is gone, security services will raid the estate and, upon finding the laptop, will have a legal reason to search the blackmail archives. With visible joy, Magnussen reveals that the plan will not work because his vaults don't physically exist; the data are in his mind palace. As a newspaper publisher, he can publicise any secret without backup documents. By giving Magnussen the laptop, Sherlock and John are now guilty of selling government secrets. They can be imprisoned for high treason, whereas Magnussen remains legally untouchable. When Mycroft and the police arrive, Sherlock coldly shoots Magnussen in the head, realising that this is the only way to free his friends and everyone else from his power.

Mycroft convinces the government to spare Sherlock a trial and, as an alternative punishment, press him into a high-risk mission in Eastern Europe. However, within minutes of taking off, Sherlock is recalled when video screens all over Great Britain begin to broadcast a loop of a static image of Jim Moriarty asking "Did you miss me?". In the post-credits scene, Moriarty breaks the fourth wall and asks the audience if they missed him as well.

== Sources and allusions ==
The plot is primarily drawn from the original short story "The Adventure of Charles Augustus Milverton", the eponymous Milverton being a blackmailer adapted into the character of Magnussen. In both stories, "Appledore" is the name of the antagonist's vaults, and in both, Holmes becomes engaged to an employee of the villain to gain access. Both stories culminate with Milverton/Magnussen's death, although in the original story Milverton is killed by one of his victims.

The title of "His Last Vow" is a play on the title of "His Last Bow", the final Sherlock Holmes story chronologically. The title is not explained within the episode but is a reference to dialogue from the previous episode, "The Sign of Three", in which Sherlock makes his last vow to always be there for John and Mary Watson. The plot of the episode is unrelated to the short story, although there are allusions present. The original story sees the detective having retired to keep bees in a Sussex cottage and in the episode, Janine mentions that she is planning to buy a Sussex cottage from which she will remove some beehives. In the closing dialogue of the episode, a story Mycroft told Sherlock about "the East wind" during their childhood, is similar to a speech from the original story.

Mary reveals her true identity in what Sherlock calls "the empty house", an alleyway hidden behind what are apparently the fronts of two houses in Leinster Gardens. Inside the "house", Mary thinks Sherlock has tricked her by positioning a dummy of himself at the end of the alley: in "The Adventure of the Empty House" a dummy is used to fool assassin Colonel Sebastian Moran in an empty house. The letters A. G. R. A. seen on the memory stick appear to be Mary Watson's actual initials. In The Sign of Four, the first original Holmes story to feature Mary Morstan, the Agra Treasure is a main focal point and cause of dispute. In the same story Bill Wiggins, a drug addict in "His Last Vow", is one of the Baker Street Irregulars. The opening sequence, in which John travels to a drug den to retrieve the son of a family friend and finds Sherlock as well, is derived from the opening of "The Man with the Twisted Lip".

According to Gatiss, Mycroft's line, "As my colleague is fond of remarking, this country sometimes needs a blunt instrument" is a reference to a comment by M describing James Bond, and is intended to suggest that the two series share the same reality.

== Production ==
=== Casting ===
In July 2013, it was announced that Danish actor Lars Mikkelsen would star as the main villain of the third series of Sherlock. Mikkelsen first appeared in a non-speaking cameo appearance at the end of "The Empty Hearse". The portrayal of Magnussen was described by Steven Moffat as "terrifying". Mikkelsen was suggested for the role by producer Sue Vertue and recorded an audition video for the production team in which he urinated in his barn. Mikkelsen was starring in a film set in East London at the time and had picked up a London accent, so he had to "re-Dane-ify" his accent.

Moffat and Vertue's son, Louis Moffat, played a young Sherlock in two scenes and Benedict Cumberbatch's real-life parents, Timothy Carlton and Wanda Ventham, reprised their roles as Sherlock's parents from "The Empty Hearse". Steven Moffat joked afterwards that Sherlock "runs on nepotism".

=== Writing ===
Steven Moffat confirmed that the cliffhanger, the return of Moriarty, had been planned as far back as series two, when he discussed the plan for Moriarty's character with actor Andrew Scott. However, he joked that he was as surprised as the viewers to see Moriarty return, noting that it is impossible to fake shooting oneself in the head. Scott appeared in a short post-credits scene talking to the camera, both firsts for the show. Moffat has commented that viewers will have to wait "years" to see the resolution of the cliffhanger.

Gatiss and Moffat had considered adapting the character of Charles Augustus Milverton for some time, considering him to be a "brilliantly realised" villain. Moffat viewed Magnussen as Sherlock's "intellectual mirror" and a "unique baddy", and stated that he fell in love with him. The character of Magnussen was originally conceived as an American retaining the name of Milverton, but Moffat changed both his nationality and name when Mikkelsen was cast. He found the name Magnussen on a website of Danish names, looking for one that resembled Milverton, the name of the original character from Doyle's short story. Gatiss noted that the character is a "fascinating new place to go" due to his differences from Moriarty. When Mikkelsen received the script, he stated that his first impression was that it was "the best script I've ever read". Contrasting Magnussen to Moriarty, Cumberbatch stated that he was "so chilling because of how real he is, how normal he is", and that he is "not driven by a mad, chaotic joker's energy that Moriarty has".

On the introduction of young Sherlock, Moffat noted that it was the logical course to take after the introduction of the Holmes parents: "Once you've got the parents in and you've got the sibling rivalry and stuff, people start to think, 'well what was young Sherlock like?' You just want those things, you want to see those things, it's part of updating it."

=== Filming ===
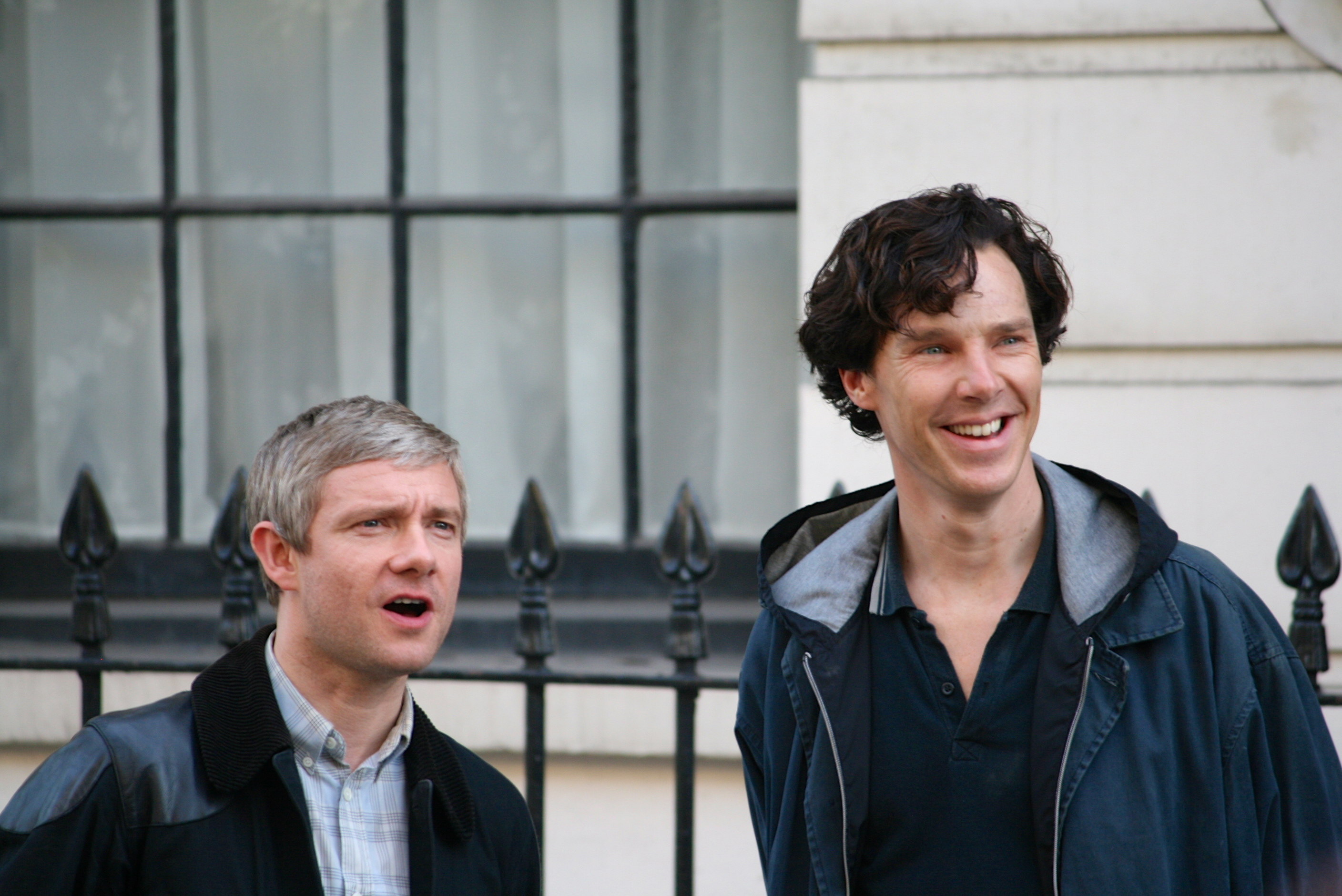
Martin Freeman (left) and Benedict Cumberbatch during filming of "His Last Vow" in August 2013.

Director Nick Hurran had previously worked with Steven Moffat on several episodes of Doctor Who, including the fiftieth anniversary special.

Filming for "His Last Vow" began on 29 July 2013. Some filming was in Cardiff, and part in Leinster Gardens, where houses 23 and 24 were shown to be mere façades. Scenes set at 'Appledore', Magnussen's house, were filmed at Swinhay House in Gloucestershire, owned by Sir David McMurtry, boss of Renishaw engineering.

The post-credits scene—depicting Moriarty (Andrew Scott) saying "Miss me?" to the camera—was originally longer, but was cut at Gatiss's recommendation to tease the audience.

== Broadcast and reception ==
The last Sherlock episode of series 3, "His Last Vow" was first broadcast on BBC One on Sunday 12 January 2014 between 8:30pm and 10:00pm GMT. Overnight, the episode was watched by 8.77 million viewers, a 31.9% share, which was down from 9.2 million (33.8%) for the opening episode of the series, "The Empty Hearse". However, when final ratings were factored, it increased to 11.38 million, the same as "The Sign of Three", but still down from "The Empty Hearse". The episode was later repeated on the digital channel BBC Three on Friday, 17 January 2014 from 9pm GMT.

The British Board of Film Classification gave the episode a 12 certificate, for "moderate violence, drug references and one use of strong language". The episode was released in the UK on DVD and Blu-ray Disc with the other episodes in the series ("The Empty Hearse" and "The Sign of Three") on 20 January 2014.

=== Critical reception ===
"His Last Vow" received critical acclaim, with Louisa Mellor of Den of Geek saying that the episode was "as good a finale as Sherlock's ever had", with a very strong plot. Mark Jefferies of The Mirror called the episode "easily the best yet in this run", with a "fascinating" plot. He also praised Mikkelsen as "brilliant". Josh Wilding, also writing for The Mirror, said the episode "was in many ways the best episode of Sherlock yet" and called it "simply one of the greatest TV shows of all-time", giving it 5/5. Caroline Frost of the Huffington Post called it a "fitting finale to the series, with writers and actors all saving their best for last", despite the third series' "patchy" performances. Serana Davies of The Telegraph called the episode "the best of the lot" and gave 4 out of 5 stars, calling Moffat "the superior Sherlock writer". Although her review was mainly positive, she questioned whether the programme had become "a little vain, rather a show-off". Lucy Mangan of The Guardian said the episode was "perfect", and a "ceaseless flow of wit, invention and intelligence", a sentiment echoed by Ellen Jones of The Independent, who stated that it contained "intelligence, humour and obscure fanboy references galore" which "delivered the goods". She went on to state that it is "enough detail in this episode to justifying watching it again and again, once weekly, until series four". Chris Harvey of The Telegraph praised the "beautifully done" conclusion of the episode featuring Moriarty, saying it was "very playful, very neat. And very unexpected". Sandipan Deb, writing in Indian newspaper Mint, was positive about the episode, calling it "the best" episode in the series, and praised its "stunning twists and turns, its thrilling upending of what we have known about the characters for a lifetime, an emotional depth not seen before, and its clever throwaway references to the Canon". Deb also praised the "uber-cool cinematic technique", singling out the moment when Sherlock has been shot and falls to the floor as an "extraordinary leap of the imagination and cinematic bravura". However, it was stated that the writers were "influenced by the zoned-out Holmes films directed by Guy Ritchie".

However, Neela Debnath, also of The Independent, said that the episode was "trying far too hard and is coming across a tad foolish", and consequently "failed to hit new heights". Despite this, she did praise Mikkelsen as Magnussen, calling his performance "sterling". Jeff Jensen of Entertainment Weekly took issue with Sherlock killing Magnussen at the end, instead of outsmarting him, viewing it as out of character: "He [Sherlock] had the smarts to brainstorm more inspired solutions to the problem of Magnusson [sic], and the seasoning to resist a degrading one". The episode deviated from source material by removing the woman who, in Doyle's story, had shot Milverton (Magnussen in the adaptation) After the airing of "His Last Vow", Moffat and Gatiss said in an interview with Empire Cinemas:

Moffat: Also, if you read [The Adventure of] Charles Augustus Milverton, Dr. Watson in the opening paragraph tells you that he's about to tell you a porkie. He says, 'I even now must be very reticent.' I think what Doyle is hinting at is that Sherlock Holmes and Dr. Watson sat in Baker Street and said, 'Right, we're going to have to go and kill him, aren't we? That's the only way we can do this.' So they break in, kill him, and then Dr. Watson writes up a version of the story that puts the murder [on someone else].

Gatiss: They're hiding in their burglar masks behind the curtain, and this random woman comes and shoots Milverton in the face and then grinds her heel into his face. It's odd, isn't it? So I mean really, it's just an extrapolation of saying, 'Well, he probably did it, I think.'

Moffat: If Sherlock Holmes decided that somebody should die, he would kill them. I don't think he'd have any problem with that.

Gatiss: He regards Milverton as a sort of plague, something that should be eradicated.

Gavia Baker-Whitelaw, writing in The Daily Dot, said that the removal of a female character was "An unfortunate occurrence that neatly fits in with Moffat's track record with female characters in both Doctor Who and Sherlock", Baker-Whitelaw goes on to question whether Mary could have killed Mikkelsen, instead of "playing right into the hands of fans who believe Moffat is a misogynist who writes all of his female characters into the same corner", and questions whether Moffat is indeed a misogynist.

Steven Moffat's writing, said Emma Dibdin of Digital Spy, is "a few degrees colder than his colleagues'", which helped the episode go back to the "cerebral, mystery-driven tone some viewers have been left craving". Paul Jones, of the Radio Times, praised Moffat's "grand, filmic episode", whilst Daniel Krupa, writing for IGN, said the episode was a reminder of "just how brilliant Sherlock [...] can be".

=== Accolades ===
"His Last Vow" was nominated for several Emmy Awards and several Critics' Choice Television Awards. At the 4th Critics' Choice Television Awards, the episode was nominated in four categories. At the 66th Primetime Emmy Awards, "His Last Vow" won seven Emmys, the most for any TV programme.

Award	Date of ceremony	Category	Recipients and nominees (Note: When recipients or nominees are given as a person, they were credited specifically for their contribution to "His Last Vow".)	Result
Critics' Choice Television Awards	19 June 2014	Best Movie	"His Last Vow"	Nominated
Critics' Choice Television Awards	19 June 2014	Best Actor in a Miniseries/Movie	Benedict Cumberbatch	Nominated
Critics' Choice Television Awards	19 June 2014	Best Supporting Actor in a Miniseries/Movie	Martin Freeman	Nominated
Critics' Choice Television Awards	19 June 2014	Best Supporting Actress in a Miniseries/Movie	Amanda Abbington	Nominated
Primetime Emmy Awards	25 August 2014	Outstanding Television Movie	Mark Gatiss, Steven Moffat, Beryl Vertue, Sue Vertue and Rebecca Eaton	Nominated
Primetime Emmy Awards	25 August 2014	Outstanding Lead Actor in a Miniseries or a Movie	Benedict Cumberbatch	Won
Primetime Emmy Awards	25 August 2014	Outstanding Supporting Actor in a Miniseries or a Movie	Martin Freeman	Won
Primetime Emmy Awards	25 August 2014	Outstanding Directing for a Miniseries, Movie, or Dramatic Special	Nick Hurran	Nominated
Primetime Emmy Awards	25 August 2014	Outstanding Writing for a Miniseries, Movie, or Dramatic Special	Steven Moffat	Won
Primetime Emmy Awards	25 August 2014	Outstanding Casting for a Miniseries, Movie, or a Special	Julia Duff & Kate Rhodes James	Nominated
Primetime Emmy Awards	25 August 2014	Outstanding Cinematography for a Miniseries or Movie	Neville Kidd	Won
Primetime Emmy Awards	25 August 2014	Outstanding Costumes for a Miniseries, Movie or a Special	Sarah Arthur & Ceri Walford	Nominated
Primetime Emmy Awards	25 August 2014	Outstanding Music Composition for a Miniseries, Movie or a Special (Original Dramatic Score)	David Arnold & Michael Price	Won
Primetime Emmy Awards	25 August 2014	Outstanding Single-Camera Picture Editing for a Miniseries or Movie	Yan Miles	Won
Primetime Emmy Awards	25 August 2014	Outstanding Sound Editing for a Miniseries, Movie or a Special	Doug Sinclair, Stuart McCowan, Jon Joyce, Paul McFadden & Sue Harding	Won
Primetime Emmy Awards	25 August 2014	Outstanding Sound Mixing for a Miniseries or Movie	John Mooney, Howard Bargroff, Doug Sinclair & Peter Gleaves	Nominated
