= Mike Payne (physicist) =

British theoretical physicist

Mike Payne FRS HonFInstP
- Education: University of Cambridge
- Known for: CASTEP, ONETEP
- Awards: Swan Medal and Prize (2014); Maxwell Medal and Prize (1996)
- Scientific career
- Fields: Computational physics, Condensed matter theory
- Workplaces: University of Cambridge
- Doctoral advisor: John C. Inkson

Michael Christopher Payne FRS HonFInstP is a British theoretical physicist, working in the field of computational physics and theoretical condensed matter physics at the University of Cambridge.

He is the creator of first principles total energy pseudopotential code CASTEP and has been involved in the development of the linear scaling code ONETEP. He was the 23rd most highly cited physical scientist in the UK between 1990 and 1999, and has published more than 250 papers which have had over 22,000 citations.

He studied at Pembroke College, Cambridge as an undergraduate and PhD student. He then spent a year in John Joannopoulos's group in the Massachusetts Institute of Technology before returning to Pembroke College as a research fellow, and to the Theory of Condensed Matter (TCM) group in the Cavendish Laboratory where he had earlier completed his PhD. He became a university lecturer in 1994, a reader in 1998 and a professor in 2000. In 2019 he became the first holder of the Ray Dolby Fellowship in Physics at Pembroke College.

He was awarded the 1996 Maxwell Medal and Prize by the Institute of Physics and gave the 1998 Mott Lecture. He was elected Fellow of the Royal Society in 2008 and awarded the Swan Medal and Prize by the Institute of Physics in 2014. In 2011 he was made an honorary fellow of the Institute of Physics. He succeeded Peter Littlewood as head of the TCM group in the Cavendish Laboratory, a post he held until 2013 when he was succeeded by Benjamin Simons.
