= Mount Temple Comprehensive School =

Mixed second-level comprehensive school in Clontarf, Dublin, Ireland

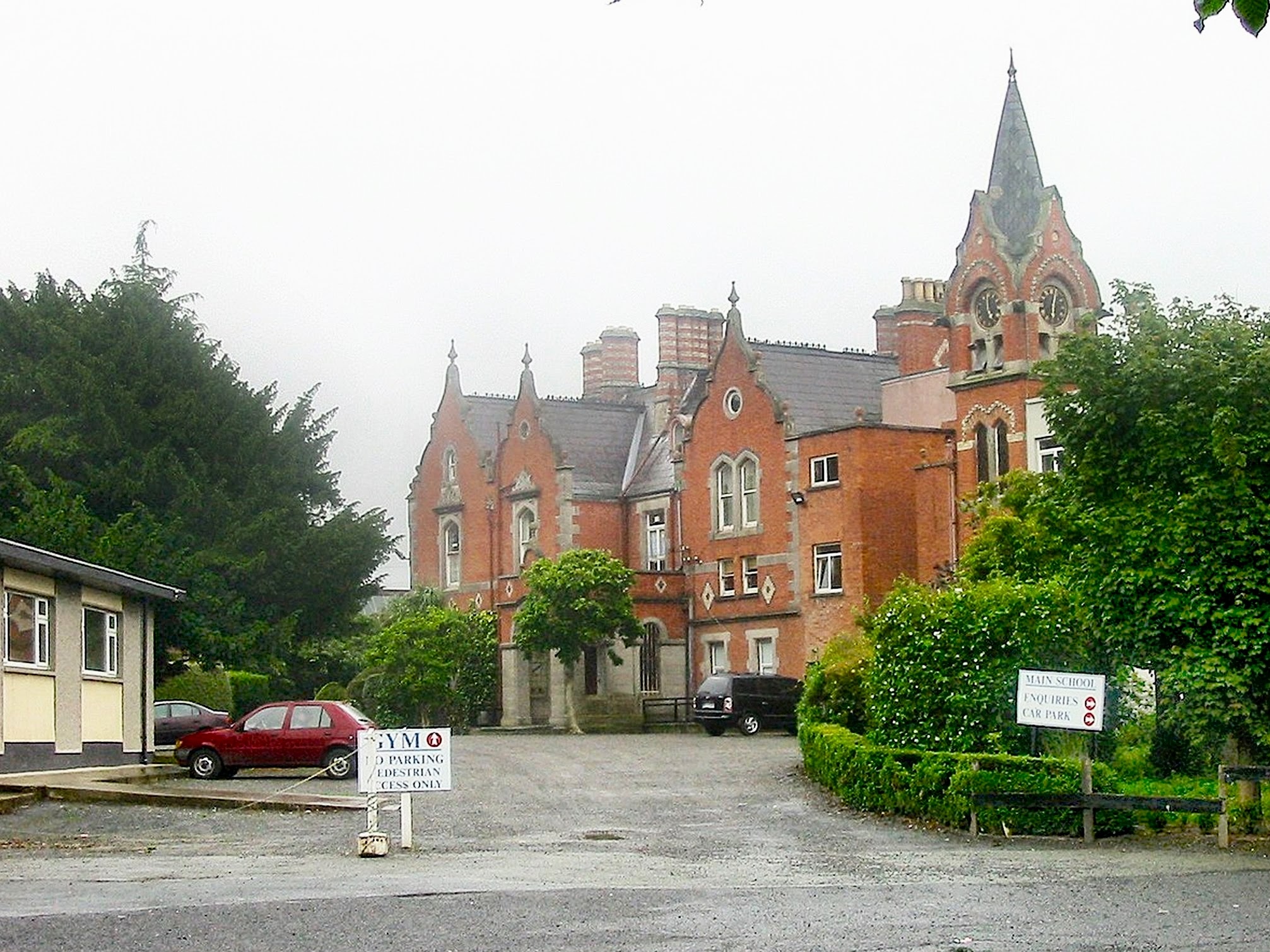

Location
- 128 Malahide Road; Clontarf, Dublin, Dublin 3 Ireland; 53.3691°N 6.2225°W

Information
- School type: Non-fee paying co-educational comprehensive voluntary secondary school
- Mottoes: All Different, All Equal, Nisi Dominus Frustra, (Without the Lord, it is in vain)
- Established: 1972
- Principal: David Bane
- Teaching staff: >50
- Years: First through sixth
- Gender: All
- Enrollment: c. 900 (2025)
- Houses: 2
- Colours: Black; Blue
- Website: mounttemple.ie

Mount Temple Comprehensive School is a secondary school in Clontarf, Dublin, Ireland. The school operates under the patronage of the Church of Ireland Archbishop of Dublin, and has, as a primary objective, the provision of state-funded second-level education to the Protestant population of northern Dublin, while accepting pupils of all religions and none. The school was established in 1972 following the amalgamation of Mountjoy School, Royal Hibernian Marine School in coastal Clontarf, and Bertrand & Rutland School.

== Students and curriculum ==
Mount Temple is a co-educational comprehensive school. It had about 450 students when it opened in 1972, which rose to over 700 students in the 1980-90s and from 2010 to 2020 had almost 900 students, and rising.

The school offers Junior Cycle, Transition Year and Leaving Certificate programmes, including the Leaving Certificate Vocational Programme and Leaving Certificate Applied.

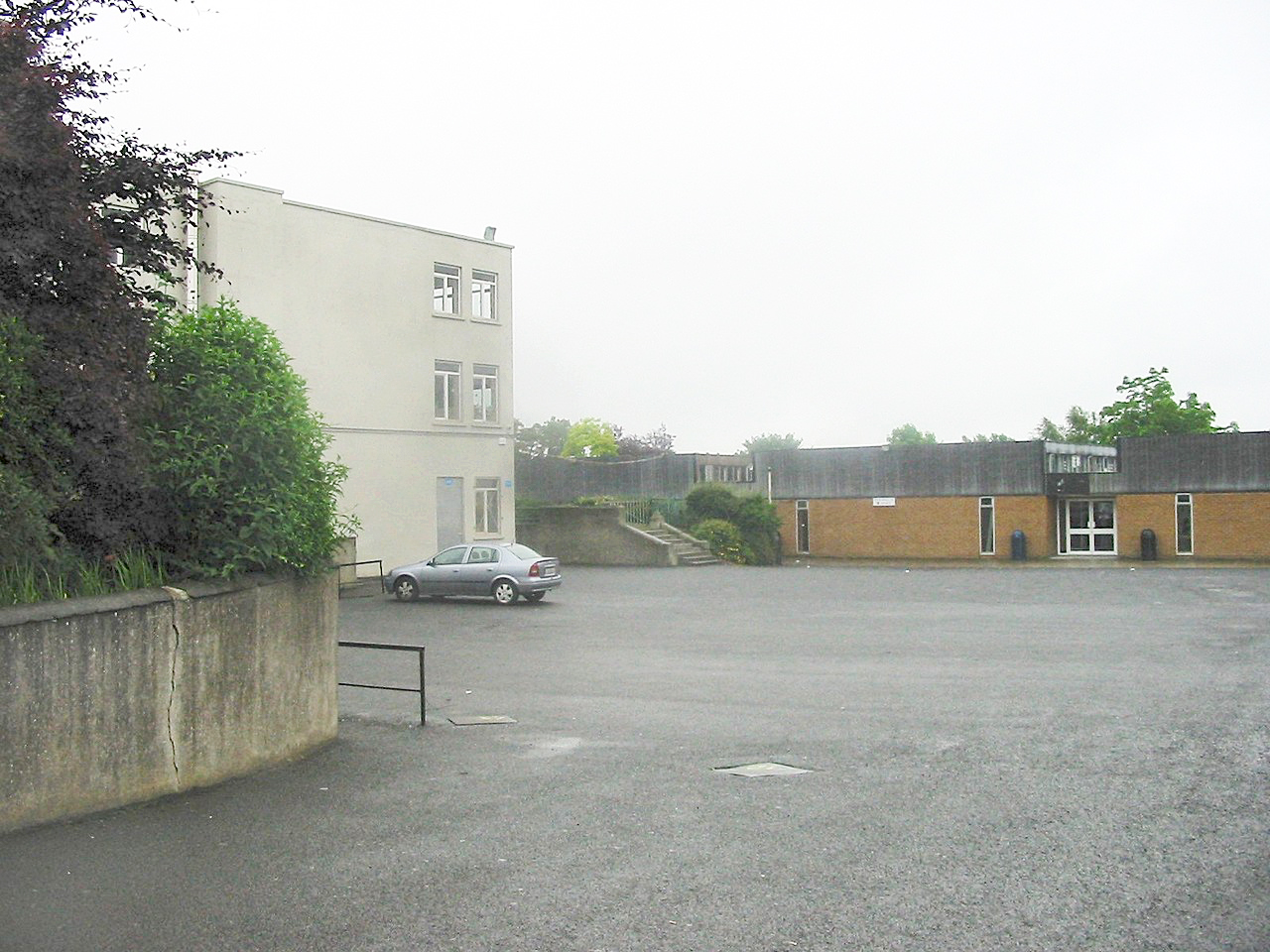
Main Mount Temple building

== Facilities ==
The school operates from several buildings, the main house (dated 1862) being a protected structure. In addition to science laboratories and IT space, the school has maintained a lending and reference library for many years, managed by both paid staff and a rota of parent volunteers. While the library collection had to be moved to make space for teaching, the library room hosted a talk by Bono in late 2022. External facilities include a number of on-premises pitches and courts.

There have been plans for many years for a new school building to be added onsite to cater for the extra students, whose numbers are otherwise leading to pressure on space and loss of other facilities to additional classroom need; as of 2022, there was no spare classroom space, nor changing rooms for sport. In 2017, the Department of Education and Skills commissioned the Wejchert architectural firm to design a new main school building, and they assembled a construction project team. After Covid-related delays, in October 2020, in response to the last application, the city council planning inspector recommended planning permission be granted, despite some local objections, clearing the way to build a three-storey school building that could accommodate 1000 students. This building, in excess of 10,000 sq. metres, is planned to replace a number of the non-protected school buildings.

== History ==
=== Three schools ===
Hibernian Marine School was a charity school founded in 1766, originally to provide for the orphans and children of seamen. The school was originally located in Ringsend, and moved to a new premises on Sir John Rogerson's Quay in 1773. In 1904 it moved to Seafield Road in Clontarf, where the Seacourt estate now stands.

Mountjoy School was a boarding school in Mountjoy Square (in the same building was the Incorporated Society for Promoting Protestant Schools), founded in 1896. It later moved to the current location in Clontarf in 1948.

Bertrand & Rutland School was in Eccles Street on the northside of Dublin. It was a Church of Ireland School, which was itself formed by a 1947 merger of Rutland School and Bertrand High school, the latter of which was in turn formed by the amalgamation of Bethesda Female Orphan School and Bertrand Female Orphan School in 1943. The Bertrand and Rutland Fund still funds scholarships to Protestant schools in Ireland.

=== Amalgamations ===
Hibernian Marine School amalgamated with Mountjoy School in 1968 and became Mountjoy & Marine School. The school later amalgamated with Bertrand & Rutland and took the name of Mount Temple Comprehensive School in 1972.

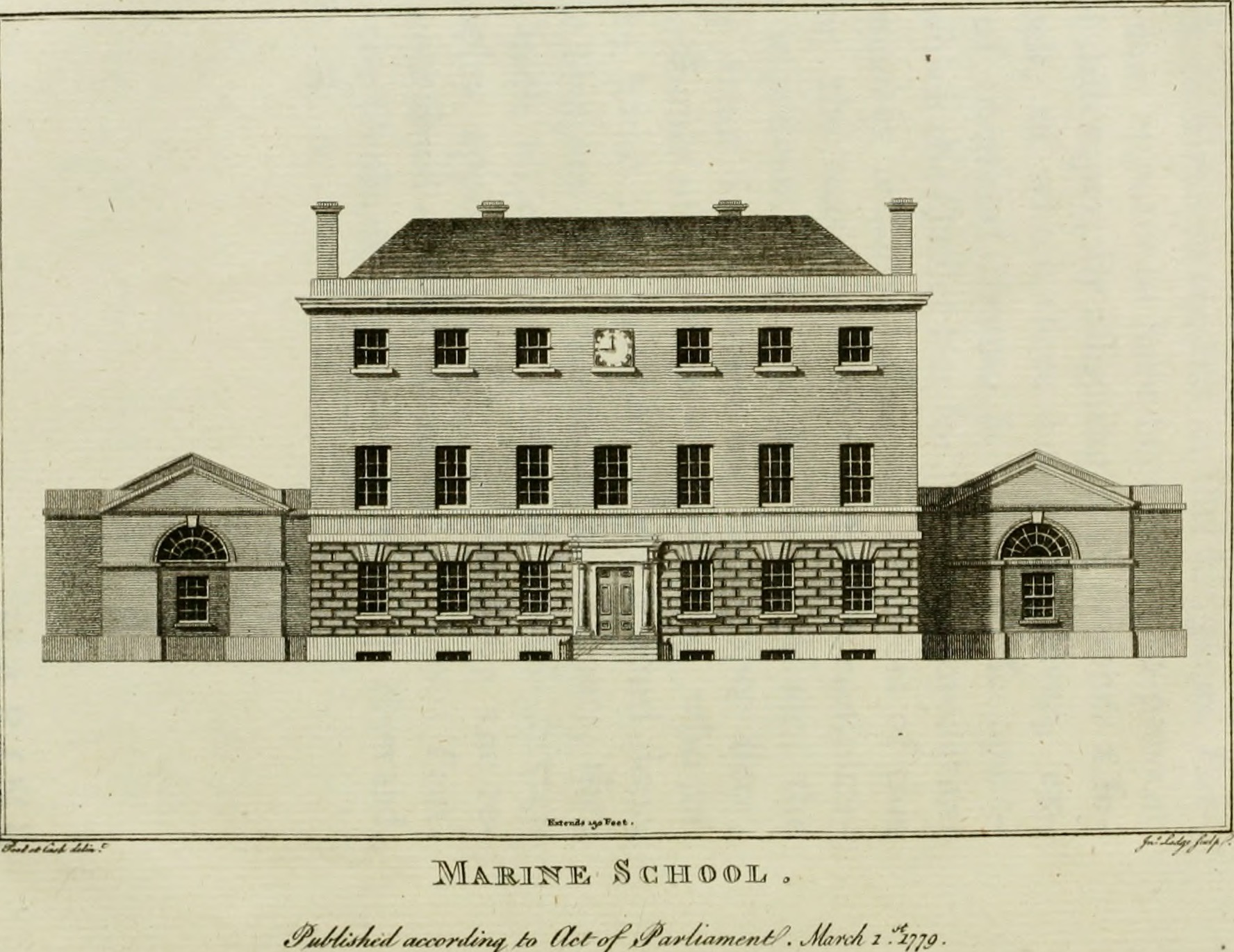
Illustration of the Hibernian Marine School on Sir John Rogerson's Quay in 1780

=== Site ===
Mount Temple was once a residence for the agent of the Earl of Charlemont. The present house was built by the magistrate J. C. Stronge in 1860, and was a family home to Elizabeth Bowen. For a period, the estate was owned by Thomas Picton-Bradshaw and known as Bradshaws. Mountjoy School then took possession in 1949 prior to the merger that formed Mount Temple Comprehensive.

=== Principals ===
The principals since the formation of Mount Temple Comprehensive School are:

- 1964–1977: J.A Brooks
- 1977–1991: John Medlycott
- 1991–2001: Elspeth Henderson
- 2001–2005: Maurice Maxwell
- 2004–2005: Jim Casey (Acting)
- 2005–2024: Liam Wegimont
- 2010–2011: Rossa Bunworth (Acting)
- 2014–2015: Helen Gormley (Acting)
- 2019–2022: Helen Gormley (Acting)
- 2022–2023: Gareth Borland (Acting)
- 2023–2024: Helen Gormley (Acting)
- 2024–present: David Bane

== Popular culture ==
Mount Temple was the school where the rock band U2 was formed. In September 1976, 14-year-old drummer Larry Mullen Jr. posted a notice on the school's noticeboard, looking for fellow musicians. All four members of U2 are former pupils of the school. The band performed a 50th anniversary concert at the school on 25 September 2026.

Christopher Nolan's autobiographical novel Under the Eye of the Clock, which won the Whitbread Award, is based around his time in Mount Temple. The school now awards "Eye of the Clock Awards" for contributions to school life and academic achievement.

In Paul Lynch's Booker Prize-winning novel, Prophet Song, Larry Stack is a teacher at Mount Temple.

== Summer activities onsite ==
During the summer months, the school is used by the Centre of English Studies (CES), catering for hundreds of international students who come to Dublin to learn English.

== Notable alumni ==
- Shaun Aisbitt, Ireland's tallest man
- Steve Averill, musician, designer working closely with U2
- Bono (Paul David Hewson), frontman of U2, and husband of activist, businesswoman and fellow past pupil, Ali Hewson
- Amanda Brunker, former Miss Ireland
- Linda Brunker, sculptor
- Diane Caldwell, Irish international footballer
- Catríona Cannon, librarian and academic
- Adam Clayton, musician, best known as the bassist of the Irish rock band U2
- Damien Dempsey, musician
- Dudley Higgins, Ireland national rugby union player and president of the Irish Rugby Football Union
- David Howell "The Edge" Evans, musician, best known as the guitarist, backing vocalist, and keyboardist of the Irish rock band U2
- Dik Evans, brother of David Howell "The Edge" Evans and founder member of The Hype and Feedback, previous incarnations of the band U2
- Frank Ll. Harrison, musicologist
- Ali Hewson, activist, businesswoman and wife of U2 frontman Bono
- Robert Hilliard, Olympic boxer, Church of Ireland minister, journalist, and communist who died fighting with the International Brigades during the Spanish Civil War
- Mick Kearney, player with Leinster Rugby
- Becky Lynch, professional wrestler (WWE)
- Andrew Maxwell, comedian
- Alan Maybury, Irish football international
- Neil McCormick, music journalist
- Sir David McMurtry, industrialist, co-founder of metrology company Renishaw plc, based in Wotton-under-Edge.
- Larry Mullen Jr., musician, drummer and the founding member of the rock band U2
- Christopher Nolan, author
- Mark O'Neill, television presenter
- Duncan Smith, Labour Party TD for Dublin Fingal

== Notable faculty ==
- Elspeth Henderson, president of Irish Girl Guides
- Patrick Hughes, former Irish cricket international
- Gerard Stembridge, writer, director and actor
