= Iain Baikie =

Scottish physicist, inventor

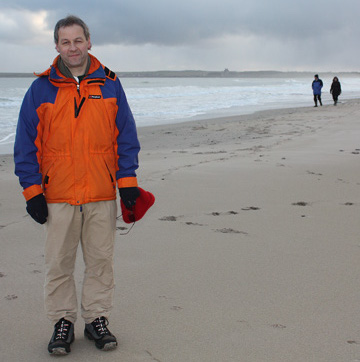
- Baikie in 2009 in Wick
- Born: 27 August 1960 (age 66); Wick, Scotland
- Education: Heriot-Watt University; Twente University
- Awards: Swan Medal and Prize (2015)
- Scientific career
- Workplaces: KP Technology; Brown University; Marine Biological Laboratory

Iain Douglas Baikie, MBE, FRSA, FInstP, CPhys (born 27 August 1960) is a Scottish physicist, inventor and company Director. He specialises in Material Science. Baikie supervises PhDs at Imperial College London and the University of St Andrews in thin-film electronics. In 2000 he founded a company- KP Technology in Wick. In 1997 Baikie was appointed Professor of Applied Physics with a Chair in Materials Science for his work on surface work function and the scanning Kelvin probe and is visiting professor at the Nanotechnology and Integrated Bio-Engineering Centre at the University of Ulster, Belfast. He is an honorary professor at the University of St Andrews.

== Research ==
Baikie developed the UK's first UHV High Resolution Scanning Kelvin Probe (SKP) incorporating surface tracking which has been applied to a range of surface phenomena. His research was awarded the alpha 5 status, indicating "Highly significant contribution to the field“. All EPSRC projects held by Prof. Baikie have achieved a minimum of alpha 4 for scientific/technical merit. Ambient and vacuum versions of the device have been developed. Application of the Vacuum version include in-situ profiling of high and low work function surfaces as suitable targets for hyperthermal surface ionisation, work which was funded by DERA.

== Honours ==
Baikie was one of the people who received a John Logie Baird Award in 2008, given in name of John Logie Baird by Logie Baird's grandson, for innovation and enterprise. In November 2015, the Institute of Physics awarded Baikie the Swan Medal and Prize for his contributions to the development of Kelvin probe method instrumentation. Baikie was appointed Member of the Order of the British Empire (MBE) in the 2017 New Year Honours for services to science education.

== Bibliography ==
- "A Novel UHV Kelvin Probe and its application in the Study of Semiconductor Surfaces", Ph.D. Thesis, Univ. of Twente (1988), ISBN 90-9002444-1.
