= Christopher Nolan (author) =

Irish poet and author (1965–2009)

- Born: 6 September 1965; Mullingar, Republic of Ireland
- Died: 20 February 2009 (aged 43); Beaumont Hospital, Dublin, Republic of Ireland
- Occupations: Author, poet, writer
- Writing career
- Notable works: Dam-Burst of Dreams; The Banyan Tree; Under the Eye of the Clock

Christopher Nolan (6 September 1965 – 20 February 2009) was an Irish poet and author. He was born in Mullingar, Ireland, but later moved to Dublin. He was educated at the Central Remedial Clinic School, Mount Temple Comprehensive School and at Trinity College, Dublin. His first book was published when he was fifteen. He won the Whitbread Book Award for his autobiography in 1987. He was also awarded an Honorary Doctorate of Letters in the UK, the medal of excellence from the United Nations Society of Writers, and a Person of the Year award in Ireland.

Because of his cerebral palsy, he experienced quadriplegia since birth. He died due to choking on 20 February 2009.

== Biography ==
=== Early life ===
Christopher Nolan was born to parents Joseph and Bernadette Nolan. He grew up in Mullingar, Ireland. Due to asphyxiation at birth, Christopher was born with permanent impairment of his "nerve-signalling system, a condition he said is now labelled dystonia". Because of these complications, Nolan was born with cerebral palsy, and could only move his head and eyes. At the beginning of his life, people believed he was intellectually disabled, but his mother proved them wrong. Bernadette brought her son to see Dr. Ciaran Barry. He was a consultant of physical medicine and rheumatology who possessed a particular interest in children with cerebral palsy. Dr. Barry was attached to the Central Remedial Clinic. He played games with Christopher, the toddler, and in so doing noted the child anticipated his actions and informed his mother that he was of sound mind.

Due to the severity of the palsy, he used a wheelchair. In an interview, his father explained how, at the age of 10, he was placed on medication by Dr. Barry that "relaxed him so he could use a pointer attached to his head to type." To write, Nolan used a special computer and keyboard; in order to help him type, his mother held his head in her cupped hands while Christopher painstakingly picked out each word, letter by letter, with a pointer attached to his forehead.

He communicated with others by moving his eyes, using a signal system. When he was young, his father told him stories and read passages from James Joyce, Samuel Beckett and D. H. Lawrence to keep his mind stimulated. His mother strung up letters of the alphabet in the kitchen, where she kept up a stream of conversation. His sister, Yvonne, sang songs and acted out skits. His mother stated that "he wrote extensively since the age of 11 and went on to write many poems, short stories and two plays, many of which were published." Many of the writings described here by Nolan's mother were compiled for his first publication, the chapbook Dam-Burst of Dreams.

=== Mature work ===
Upon becoming a teenager, Nolan received his education from the Central Remedial Clinic School, Mount Temple Comprehensive School and at Trinity College, Dublin. At the age of fifteen, he published his first book, a collection of poems titled Dam-Burst of Dreams. He was also awarded an Honorary Doctorate of Letters in the UK, the medal of excellence from the United Nations Society of Writers, and a Person of the Year award in Ireland. He wrote an account of his childhood, Under the Eye of the Clock, published by St. Martin's Press, which won him the UK's Whitbread Book of the Year Award in 1987 at the age of 21. He soon dropped out of Trinity College to write a novel entitled The Banyan Tree (1999).

Nolan spent more than a decade writing The Banyan Tree. According to The New York Times the book is a multi-generational story of a dairy-farming family in Nolan's native county of Westmeath. The story is seen through the eyes of the ageing mother. It was inspired, he told Publishers Weekly, by the image of "an old woman holding up her skirts as she made ready to jump a rut in a field." A review of the book was done in The New York Times by Maghan O'Rourke. She reviews the book and relates it to James Joyce's Portrait of the Artist as a Young Man, in the story, the protagonist leaves his mother in Ireland while he moves on to travel the world. Nolan however, gives the reader a version of the mother's story. "And so, in the end, one suspects that he wants Minnie's good-natured, commonplace ways to stand as their own achievement, reminding us that life continues in the places left behind."

=== Death ===
While working on a new novel, on 20 February 2009, Nolan died suddenly, aged 43, in Beaumont hospital in Dublin, after a piece of salmon became trapped in his airway.

Irish president Mary McAleese, upon hearing the news, said:

Christopher Nolan was a gifted writer who attained deserved success and acclaim throughout the world for his work, his achievements all the more remarkable given his daily battle with cerebral palsy.

Minister for Arts Martin Cullen TD reflected that people should draw inspiration from Nolan's life. "With grace and courage, and with the support of his family, he never gave up and he never gave in [...] His bold creativity has ensured a written legacy."

Nothing has been released from the book in progress in 2009 since his death.

== Writing ==
=== Publications ===
Nolan's autobiography Under the Eye of the Clock (published 1987), won the Whitbread Award and was named Book of the Year. Although an autobiography, it is narrated by a fictional character named Joseph Meehan who details Nolan's life as a third-person biography. The book reveals the deep relationship between Nolan and his mother, whom he calls Nora. Under the Eye of the Clock shows how Nolan's parents engaged him in conversation and outdoor activities like hiking and riding. The book was a best-seller in Britain and the United States. Nolan's writing style is often compared to James Joyce and Dylan Thomas. Critics also point out that Nolan's distinct writing style omits articles and uses participle construction other than relative clauses.

Nolan wrote The Banyan Tree (published 1999) in perspective of a country woman, Minnie O'Brien. The novel spans 80 years of Minnie's life, cutting from present to past to show the individuality of a woman and a mother who is determined to save the family's farm. The Philadelphia Inquirer appreciated "Nolan's soaring language and lilting alliterative style [which] suffuse [...] much of the book with a sense of the miraculous" and The New York Times Book Review found it "richly – even baroquely – told [...] Nolan writes with verve."

Dam-Burst of Dreams (published 1981), provided Nolan critical acclaim that compared him to the works of W. B. Yeats and James Joyce. The collection was published four years after Nolan was administered Lioresal but some of the poems were written when Nolan was just 12 years old. The title of the collection emphasized the recurrent theme of the overflow and release of his mental intellect. The collection's poems are heavy with alliteration and incorporate neologisms that draw from combinations of pre-existing root words.

=== Influences and mentors ===
Nolan often discouraged inquiries about his literary influences. During an interview, he once wrote: "Everything is an influence to a person trapped in a nightmare!" Nolan's enthusiasm for literature however was largely attributed to his father's appreciation of James Joyce, Samuel Beckett, and D. H. Lawrence. Every night his father would read him several passages from Joyce's Ulysses and other literary works. Listening to such pieces not only kept Nolan stimulated but piqued his interest in writing his own poetry.

In a poetry competition hosted by the British Spastics Society, Nolan received praise from writer Edna Healey, wife of then Chancellor of the Exchequer Denis Healey. As a judge of the competition, she was one of the early recognizers of Nolan's writing abilities. Healey was later invited as a guest on the BBC program titled "The World this Weekend." On the broadcast in response to the question "what was the most impressive moment," she remarked that reading Nolan's work: "Was the highspot of my year."

When enrolling him for secondary school, Nolan's family struggled to convince educators that Nolan would be able to function in a regular class setting. Mount Temple Comprehensive School headmaster John Medlycott believed it was possible to devise a set-up to accommodate Nolan:

We tried not to make concessions [...] He came into a mixed ability class and went to all his classes. We didn't demand homework, but he followed the normal school curriculum. We didn't smother him: it was up to him to sink or swim, and he swam.

Thanks to Medlycott, Nolan was accepted into Mount Temple and later was received by Trinity College, Dublin after Medlycott provided a personal recommendation.

== Pop culture ==
Nolan's life story and works have been referenced in several musical works. Rock band U2, whose members attended school with Nolan, wrote their song "Miracle Drug" (from How to Dismantle an Atomic Bomb) about him.

Bono said of Nolan:

We all went to the same school and just as we were leaving, a fellow called Christopher Nolan arrived. He had been deprived of oxygen for two hours when he was born, so he was quadriplegic. But his mother believed he could understand what was going on and used to teach him at home. Eventually, they discovered a drug that allowed him to move one muscle in his neck. So they attached this unicorn device to his forehead and he learned to type. And out of him came all these poems that he'd been storing up in his head. Then he put out a collection called Dam-Burst of Dreams, which won a load of awards and he went off to university and became a genius. All because of a mother's love and a medical breakthrough.

On R.E.M.'s 1988 Green album, the song "The Wrong Child" was inspired by Nolan's memoir Under the Eye of the Clock. The song deals with a child who wishes to play with his peers outside but is instead laughed at. Throughout the song, the refrain "I'm not supposed to be like this / But it's okay" is repeated several times.

Nolan was once approached by a Los Angeles film producer who was interested in making his biography into a movie. Nolan declined the offer and responded:

I want to highlight the creativity within the brain of a cripple [...] and while not attempting to hide the crippledom I want instead to filter all sob-storied sentiment from his portrait and dwell upon his life, his laughter, his vision, and his nervous normality. Can we ever see eye-to-eye on that schemed scenario?

== Honours ==
In 1988 he was made a member of Aosdána.

Every year, his secondary school Mount Temple Comprehensive School holds an award show in his honour. The "Eye of the Clock Awards" are hosted in the last week of school for all students. These awards are given to students for extraordinary efforts in school and are inspired by Nolan's efforts in school.

In 2025, he was posthumously awarded a degree by Trinity College Dublin in recognition of his work.
