= M Squared Lasers =

M Squared Lasers Limited
- Type: Limited Company
- Industry: Photonics
- Founded: 2005
- Headquarters: Glasgow, Scotland, UK
- Area served: Worldwide
- Key people: Dr. Graeme Malcolm FRSE, Dr. Gareth Maker, Mr. Bill Miller, Dr. John Nicholls, Dr. David Armstrong
- Products: Lasers
- Website: www.m2lasers.com

M Squared Lasers is a company headquartered in Glasgow, Scotland with a subsidiary, M Squared Lasers Inc., based in San Jose, California. It was established in 2005 by Graeme Malcolm and Gareth Maker who had previously been directors of Microlase Limited and Coherent Scotland Limited. They entered administration in August 2025 after failing to secure sufficient funding to continue trading.

The company designs and manufactures lasers and photonic instruments for applications in academia, remote sensing, biophotonics, defence and metrology. According to their entry in the Scottish Optoelectronics Association, the company specializes technically in diode-pumped solid-state ti-sapphire, mid-infrared and terahertz lasers.

== History ==
M Squared Lasers was founded in 2005 by Dr. Graham Malcolm FRSE and Dr. Gareth Maker who had previously held senior roles in Coherent Scotland, a subsidiary of Coherent Inc. Malcolm and Maker founded an optoelectronics company called Microlase in 1992 as a spinout from Strathclyde University in Scotland. Microlase was acquired by Coherent in 2000. Malcolm won the Katharine Burr Blodgett Medal and Prize in 2008 in part for the founding of the company.

In February 2012 M Squared announced that former Oclaro chairman Peter Bordui was to be the company's chairman.

In August 2025, the company announced that it was seeking buyers for its assets after failing to secure sufficient funding from investor to continue operations. It claimed that challenges in finding skilled staff and supply chain disruptions were some of the causes for its financial troubles.
