= Swinhay House =

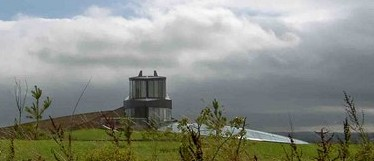
- A view of Swinhay House, showing the panoramic viewing room tower

- Location in Gloucestershire
- 51°38′34.8″N 02°23′21.84″W
- Location: Wotton-under-Edge, Gloucestershire, England

Swinhay House is a futuristic building built for David McMurtry, an industrialist, in North Nibley near Wotton-under-Edge, Gloucestershire.

== History ==
McMurtry bought a 230 acres (93 ha) piece of land and forest in North Nibley near Wotton-under-Edge, Gloucestershire. David Austin designed a modern-day eco-friendly country manor and in 2000 acquired PPG 7 planning permission for it as a "Millennium House", under guidance that allowed for the creation of houses of exceptional architectural interest within the green belt. Swinhay House, a ten-level, eight bedroom country home of 33,000 square feet (3,100 m^{2}), contains a swimming pool, a Jacuzzi and sauna, a bowling alley, a squash court, a fully enclosed glazed winter garden and a panoramic viewing room set 14.5 metres (48 ft) above the ground level.

Although the house is complete and operational, McMurtry and his family do not live in it. Instead it is used to host charitable causes, and rented out to fashion photographers and film makers. The home was used in the final episode of the third series of BBC One's Sherlock, as the home of nemesis Charles Augustus Magnussen; the fee for its use was donated to charity.
