= Shaun Aisbitt =

Ireland's tallest man

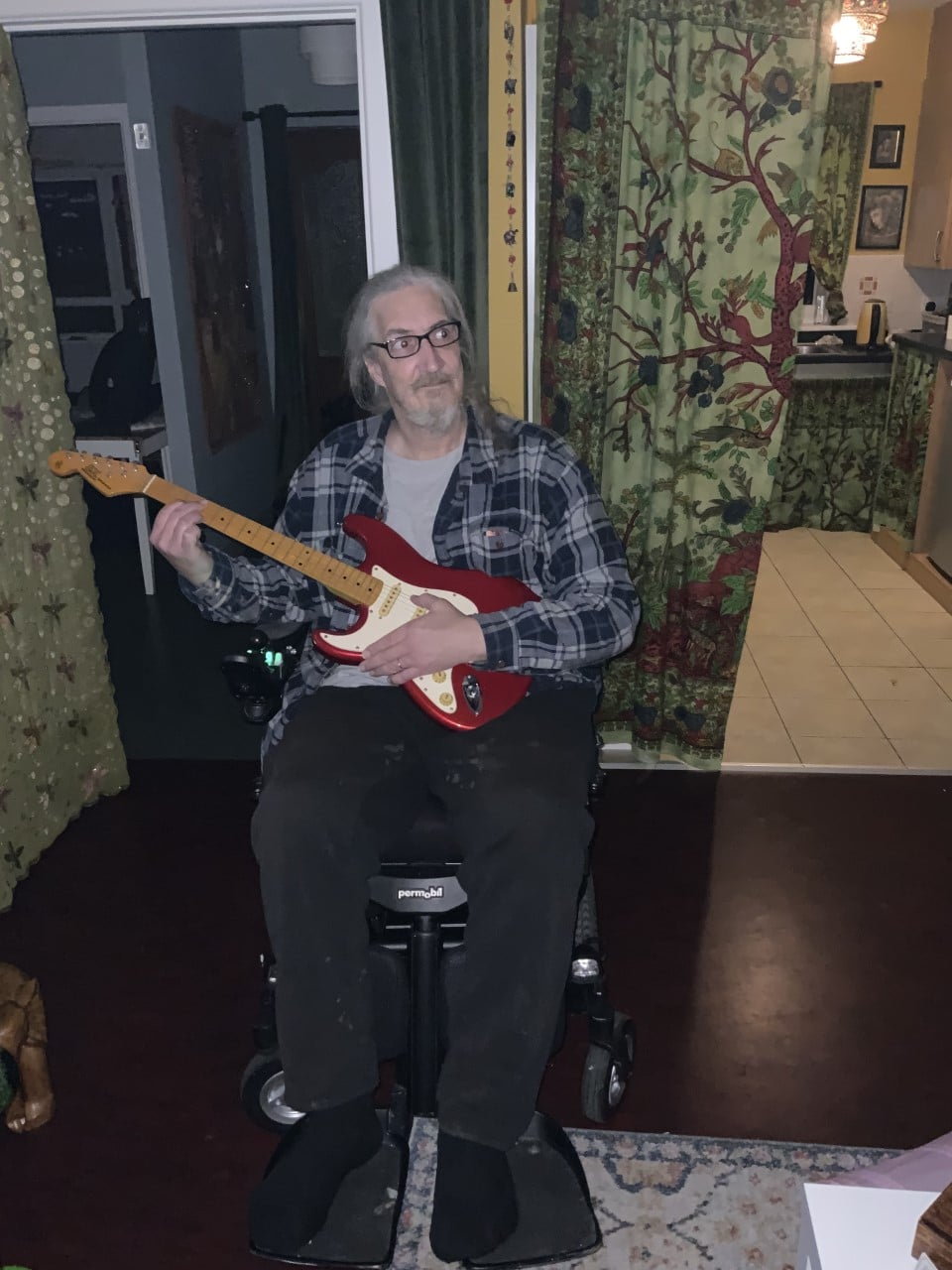
- Shaun Aisbitt in 2024
- Born: England
- Occupation: Pastor
- Known for: Ireland's tallest man

Shaun Aisbitt is a pastor and author who is known for being Ireland's tallest man.

== Early life ==
Aisbitt was born in Aldershot, Hampshire, England, to an Irish mother. He spent most of his early childhood in Kiveton Park, Sheffield, Yorkshire, but after his father died, the family moved to Ireland. Aisbitt was raised in the Ballybough and North Strand areas in Dublin. He attended a number of schools, including the O'Brien Institute and Artane Industrial School, before settling at St. Columba's National School and then Mount Temple Comprehensive School. He shared classes with Larry Mullen of U2.

== Early career ==
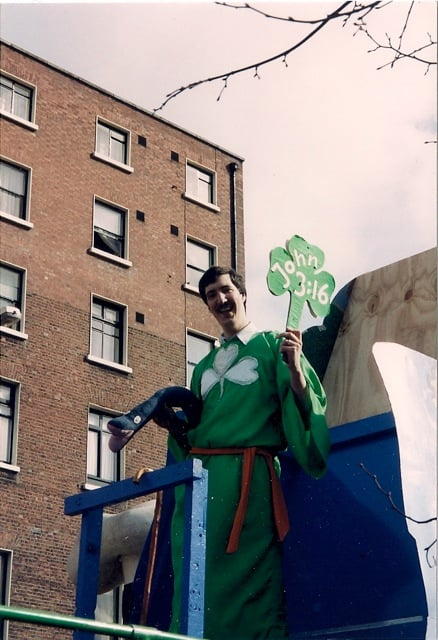
Shaun Aisbitt as St. Patrick, in the Dublin Dublin parade

Aisbitt worked for a time at the Olympia Theatre as a stage doorman. He looked after visiting stars, including Marcel Marceau, Ronnie Corbett, Lenny Henry, Shirley Bassey, Stephen Fry, Howard Keil, Freddie Starr, David Essex, The Pogues, Johnny Cash, Lyle Lovett and Robert Cray. He also encountered Robin Williams, some members of the Rolling Stones and other contemporary musicians and film stars. Aisbitt has appeared in many television programmes in Ireland and England.

== Ireland's tallest man ==
At the age of 21, Aisbitt was declared Ireland's tallest man following a competition on The Late Late Show. At this time he was approximately 6 ft 11 in (2.11 m). Aisbitt started to grow again at the age of 39, at this time he was diagnosed with gigantism. By 2016, he had reached the height of 7 ft 4 in (2.24 m). As a consequence of the condition and his height, he spent a time confined to bed. However, he regained his mobility through the use of a specialised wheelchair.

Aisbitt regularly played a comical character in stop motion animations that were broadcast on Irish national television.

== Pastoral work ==
Aisbitt is a Christian pastor, who conducted international missionary work in Antwerp Belgium, Cardiff Wales, Singapore, across Romania, Istanbul Türkiye, Budapest Hungary and Malaysia but had to reduce this activity for health reasons. His writings on the Beatitudes and on religious cults have been cited. He has helped many people around the World leave religious cults.

He helped found the Tall Persons' Club in Ireland and was its first president.

== Personal life ==
Aisbitt lives in Greystones with his wife Jackie. He has a younger brother Karl who is 6 ft 5 in (1.96 m) and an older sister Julia who lives in Spain.
