= David McMurtry =

Irish billionaire businessman (1940–2024)

Sir David McMurtry CBE FRS FREng RDI FIMechE
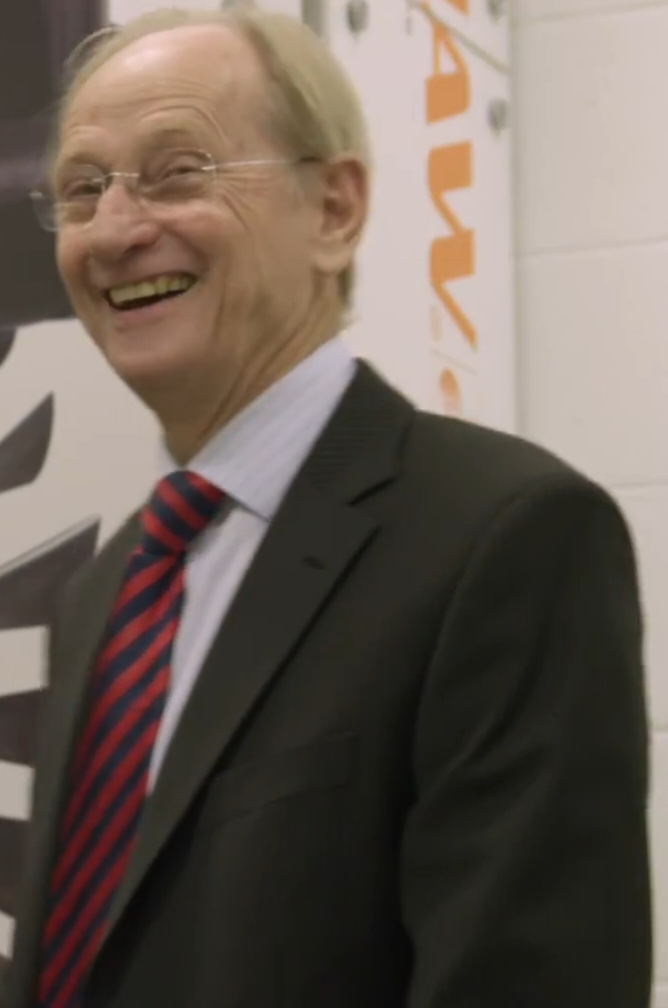
- McMurtry in 2012
- Born: David Roberts McMurtry; 5 March 1940; Clontarf, Dublin, Ireland
- Died: 9 December 2024 (aged 84); Gloucestershire, England
- Education: Mountjoy School
- Years active: 1958–2024
- Title: Chairman and co-founder, Renishaw plc
- Spouse: Teresa Adams (m. 1966)
- Children: 3

Sir David Roberts McMurtry (5 March 1940 – 9 December 2024) was an Irish billionaire businessman, who was the co-founder and executive chairman of Renishaw plc, the UK's largest supplier of metrology equipment. As of December 2024, his net worth was estimated at US$1.3 billion.

== Early life and education ==
David Roberts McMurtry was born the second child of Frederick and Margaret McMurtry, on 5 March 1940, in Clontarf, Dublin, Ireland. He was brought up in Dublin and educated at Mountjoy School (now the Mount Temple Comprehensive School) in Dublin. McMurtry moved to the UK at the age of 18, in 1958.

== Career ==
McMurtry joined Bristol Aeroplane Company as an apprentice in 1958. In 1966, following an acquisition, he found himself employed by Rolls-Royce Holdings where he became Deputy Chief Designer and Assistant Chief of Engine Design at Filton. In 1973, while working on Concorde's engines, he designed his first trigger probe. He worked on the Turbo-Union RB199 engine.

In 1973, he joined his former colleague John Deer to set up Renishaw plc. The company floated on the Unlisted Securities Market in 1983, and gained a full listing the following year. In 1987, McMurtry acquired the patents for his trigger probes from Rolls-Royce Holdings and began to exploit the patents himself. In 1989, he became a Royal Designer for Industry.

In 2018, McMurtry stepped down as chief executive of Renishaw and was replaced by marketing and sales director William Lee.

On 2 March 2021, McMurtry, along with John Deer, indicated that they wished to dispose of their entire holdings in Renishaw, comprising some 53% of the shares, as 'we recognise that neither of us is getting any younger'. The Renishaw board then announced that it was launching a formal sale process for the entire company. This process was terminated on 7 July 2021, after the board concluded that none of the proposals met their objectives.

In June 2024, McMurtry stepped down as executive chairman of Renishaw and remained on the board as a non-executive director.

According to the Sunday Times Rich List 2024, with a net worth of £1.2 billion, McMurtry was the 135th richest person in the UK. He was the 157th richest on the list the year before.

== Personal life and death ==
McMurtry married Teresa Adams in 1966, who survives him, and had three children. He lived in Wotton-under-Edge, England.

In 2001, McMurtry started working on Swinhay House. After it was completed, the "£30m futuristic eco-house" appeared in an episode of the BBC television series Sherlock.

McMurtry died in Gloucestershire on 9 December 2024, at the age of 84.

== Awards and honours ==
McMurtry received the Queen's Award for Enterprise (now The King's Awards for Enterprise) in 1979. He was appointed Commander of the Order of the British Empire (CBE) in the 1994 Birthday Honours for services to Science and Technology, and was knighted in the 2001 New Year Honours for services to Design and Innovation.

McMurtry was an honorary fellow of Cardiff University. He was also a fellow of the Institution of Mechanical Engineers. He was elected a fellow of the SME in 1988. He was a recipient of the MacRobert Award. McMurtry received an honorary doctorate from Heriot-Watt University in 1998. In 2001, McMurtry was elected a Fellow of the Royal Academy of Engineering. In 2008, the University of Bath awarded him an honorary doctorate. In 2011, he was elected a Fellow of the Royal Society. He won the Katharine Burr Blodgett Medal and Prize in 2012. In 2017, McMurtry received an honorary doctorate from the University of Huddersfield. He was the recipient of the 2019 James Watt International Gold Medal.

== See also ==
- McMurtry Spéirling
