= 4th Critics' Choice Television Awards =

- Date: June 19, 2014
- Location: The Beverly Hilton, Los Angeles
- Country: United States
- Presented by: Broadcast Television Journalists Association
- Hosted by: Cedric the Entertainer

Highlights
- Most awards: Fargo; Orange Is the New Black (3)
- Most nominations: The Big Bang Theory; Fargo; The Good Wife; Masters of Sex; The Normal Heart (5)
- Best Comedy Series: Orange Is the New Black
- Best Drama Series: Breaking Bad
- Website: www.criticschoice.com

Television/radio coverage
- Network: The CW

The 4th Critics' Choice Television Awards ceremony, presented by the Broadcast Television Journalists Association (BTJA), honored the best in primetime television programming from June 1, 2013, to May 31, 2014, and was held on June 19, 2014, at The Beverly Hilton in Los Angeles, California. The nominations were announced on May 28, 2014. The ceremony was hosted by comedian and actor Cedric the Entertainer and was broadcast live on The CW. Ryan Murphy received the Critics' Choice Louis XIII Genius Award.

== Winners and nominees ==
Winners are listed first and highlighted in boldface:

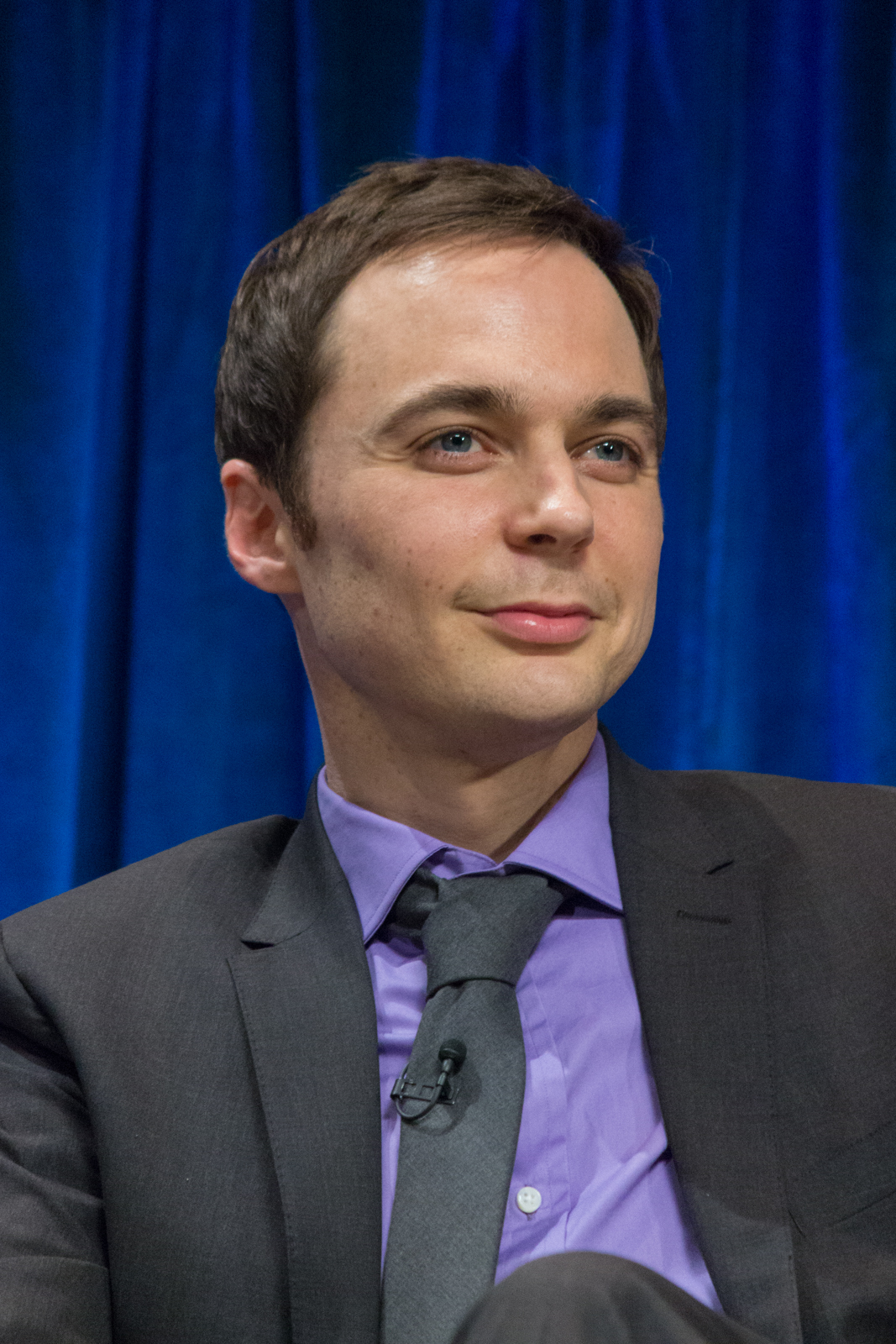
Jim Parsons, Best Actor in a Comedy Series winner

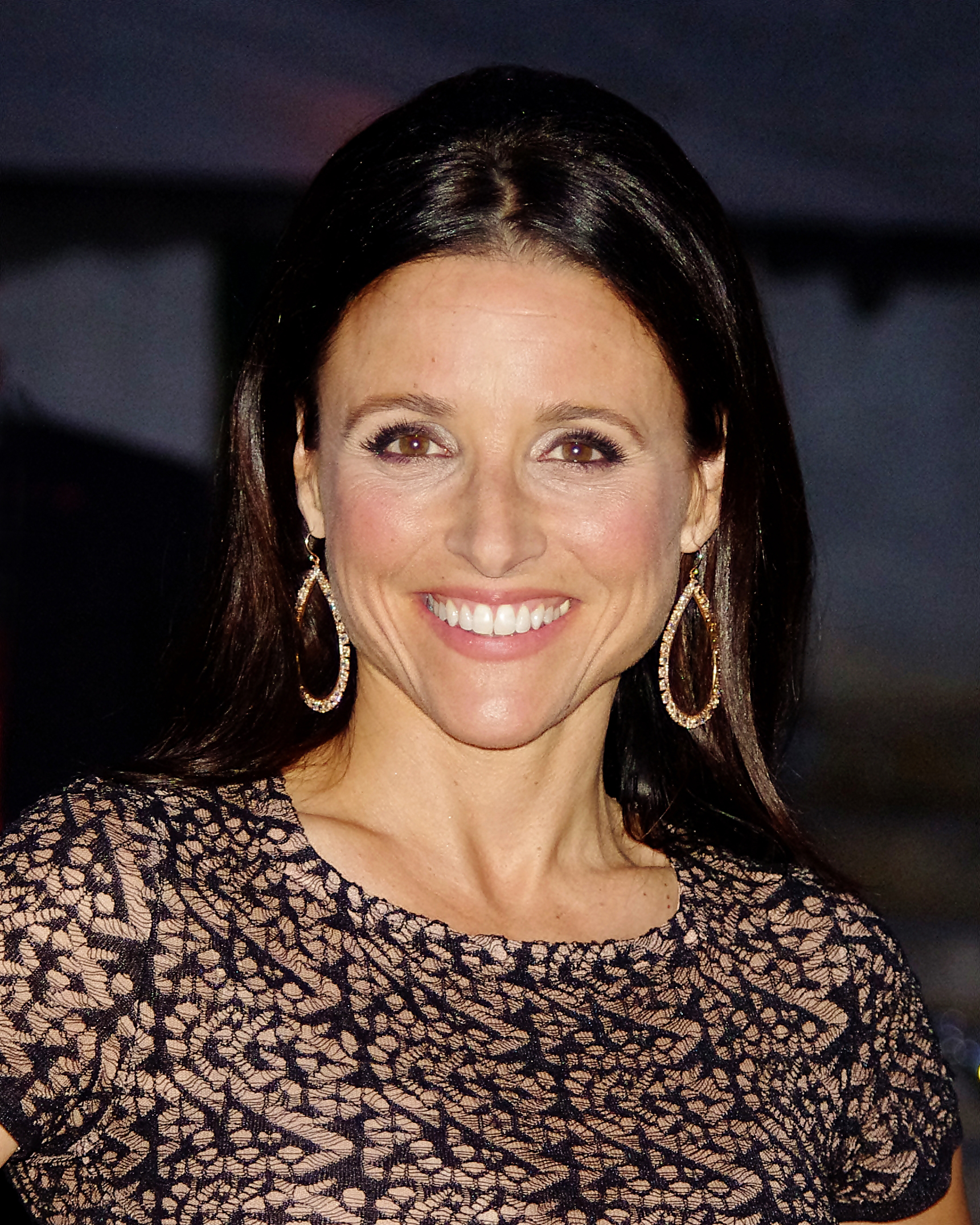
Julia Louis-Dreyfus, Best Actress in a Comedy Series winner

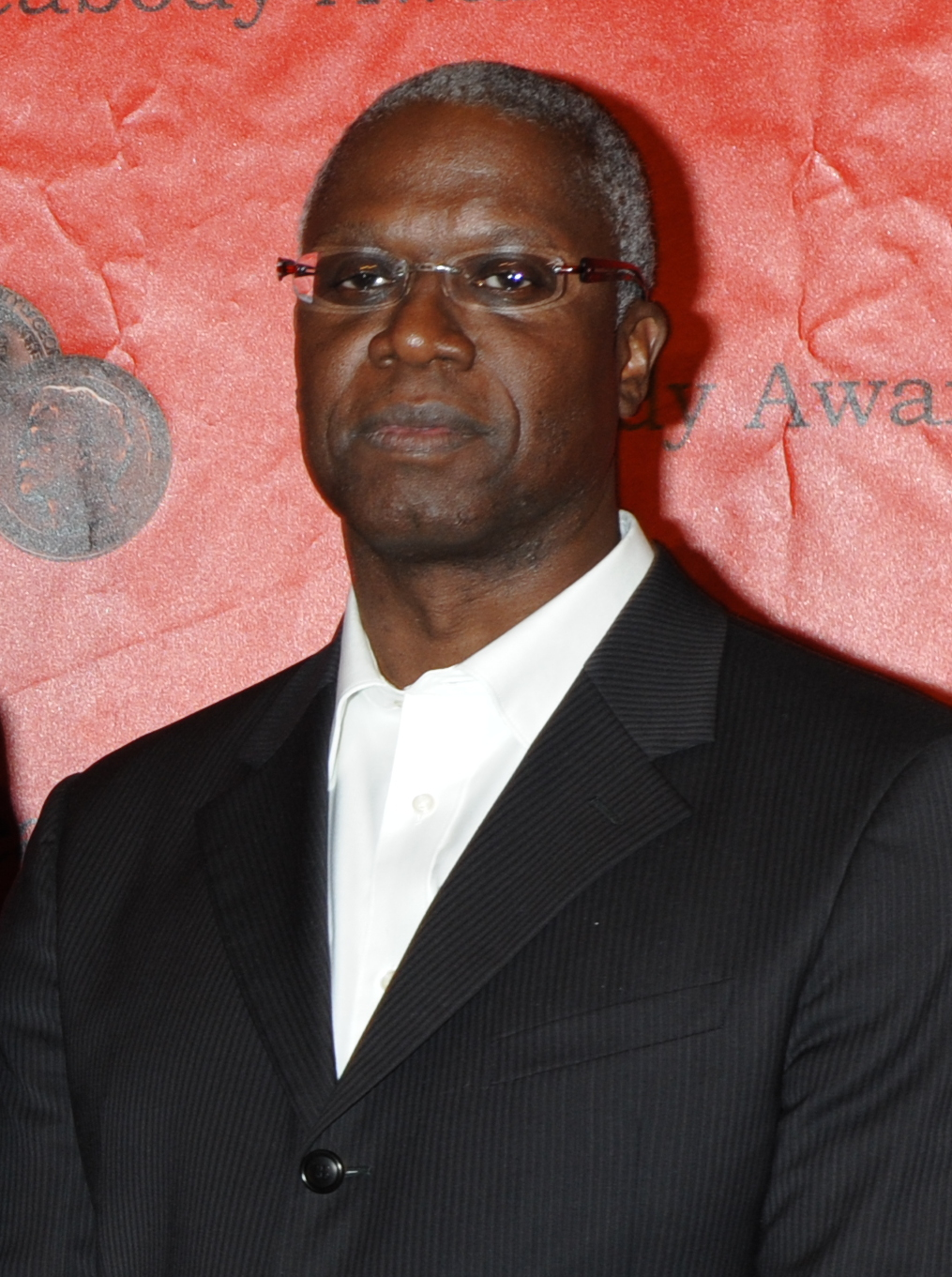
Andre Braugher, Best Supporting Actor in a Comedy Series winner

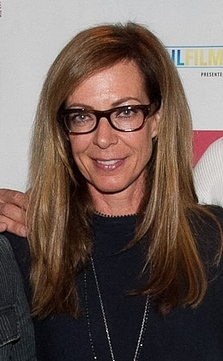
Allison Janney, Best Supporting Actress in a Comedy Series co-winner and Best Guest Performer in a Drama Series winner

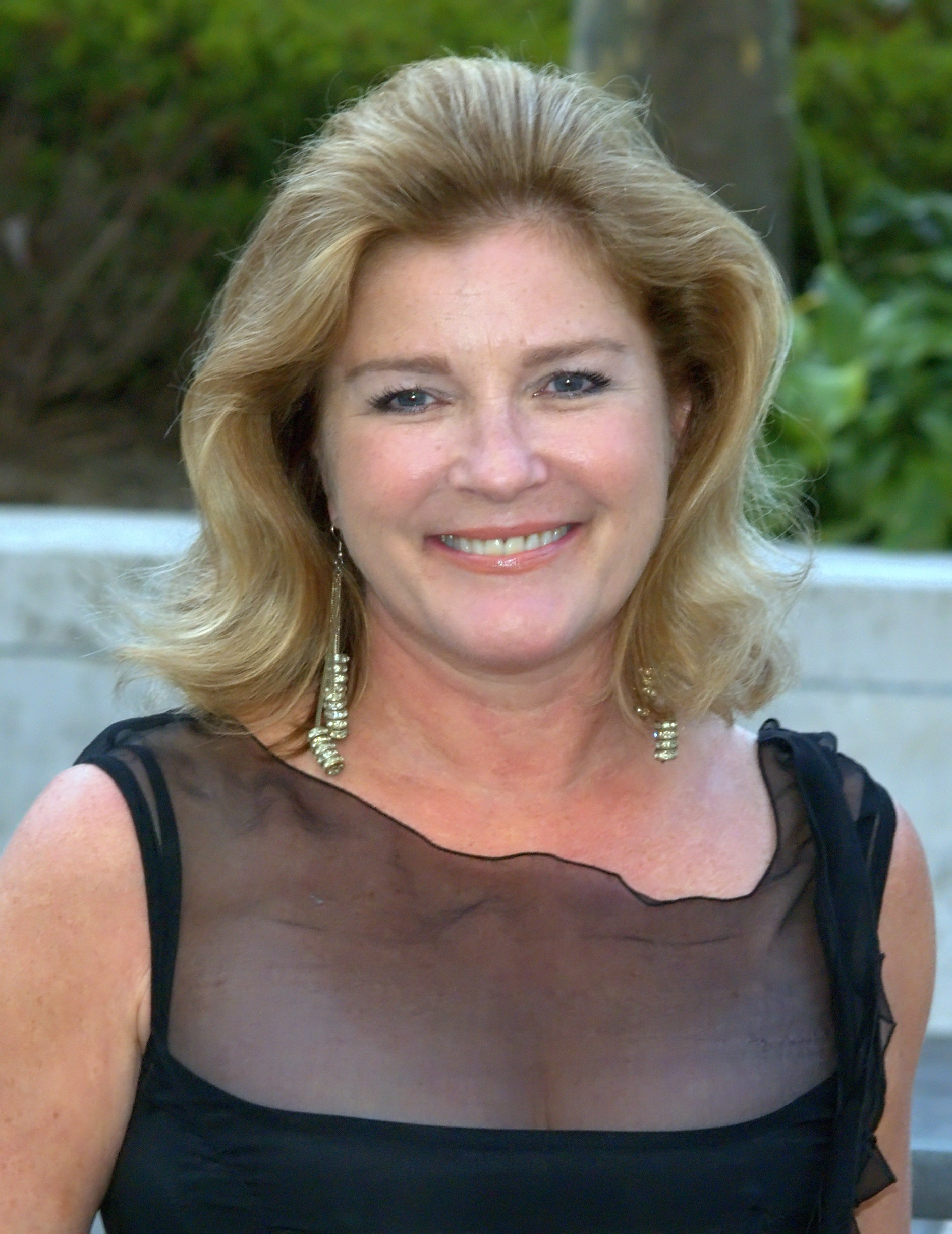
Kate Mulgrew, Best Supporting Actress in a Comedy Series co-winner

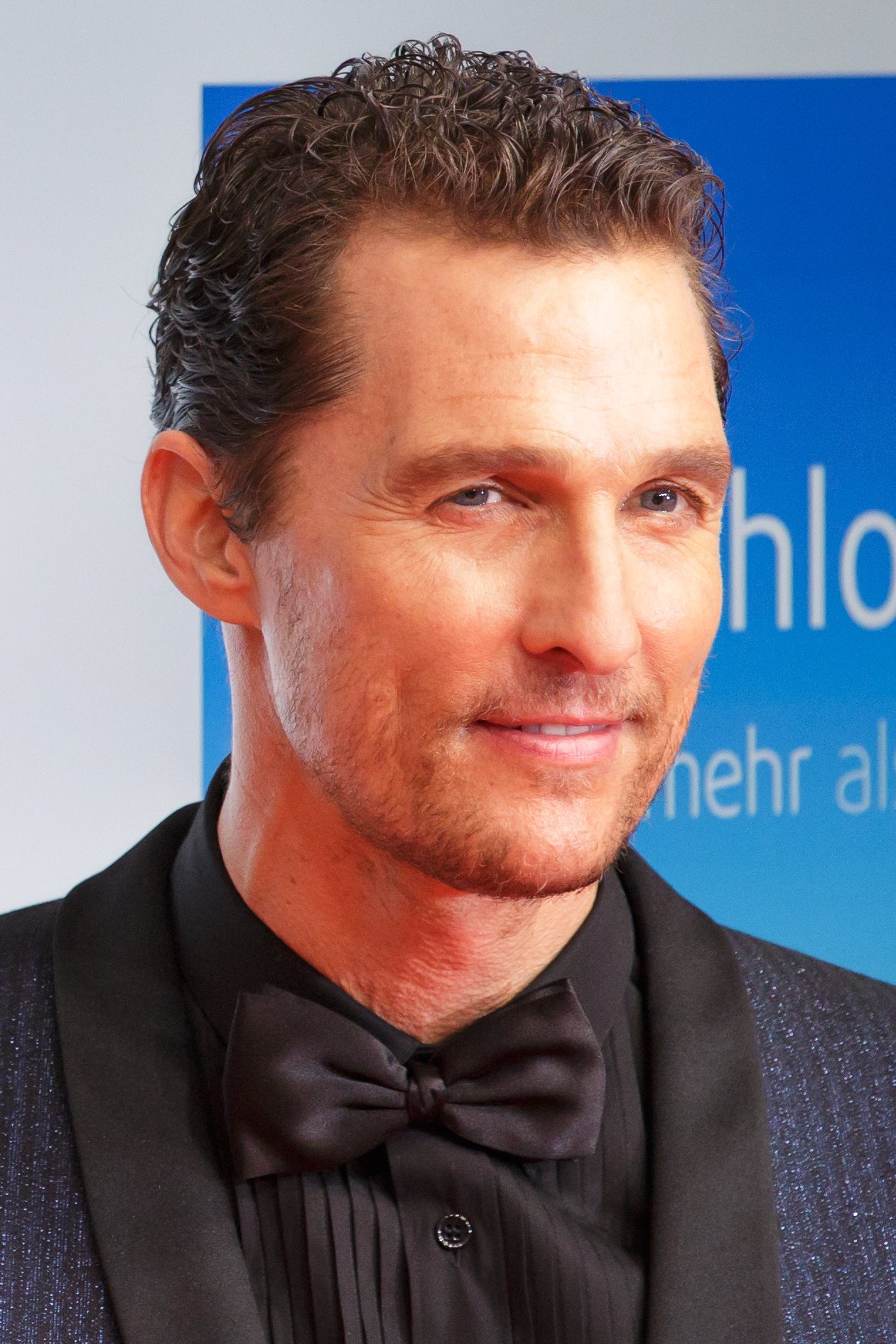
Matthew McConaughey, Best Actor in a Drama Series winner

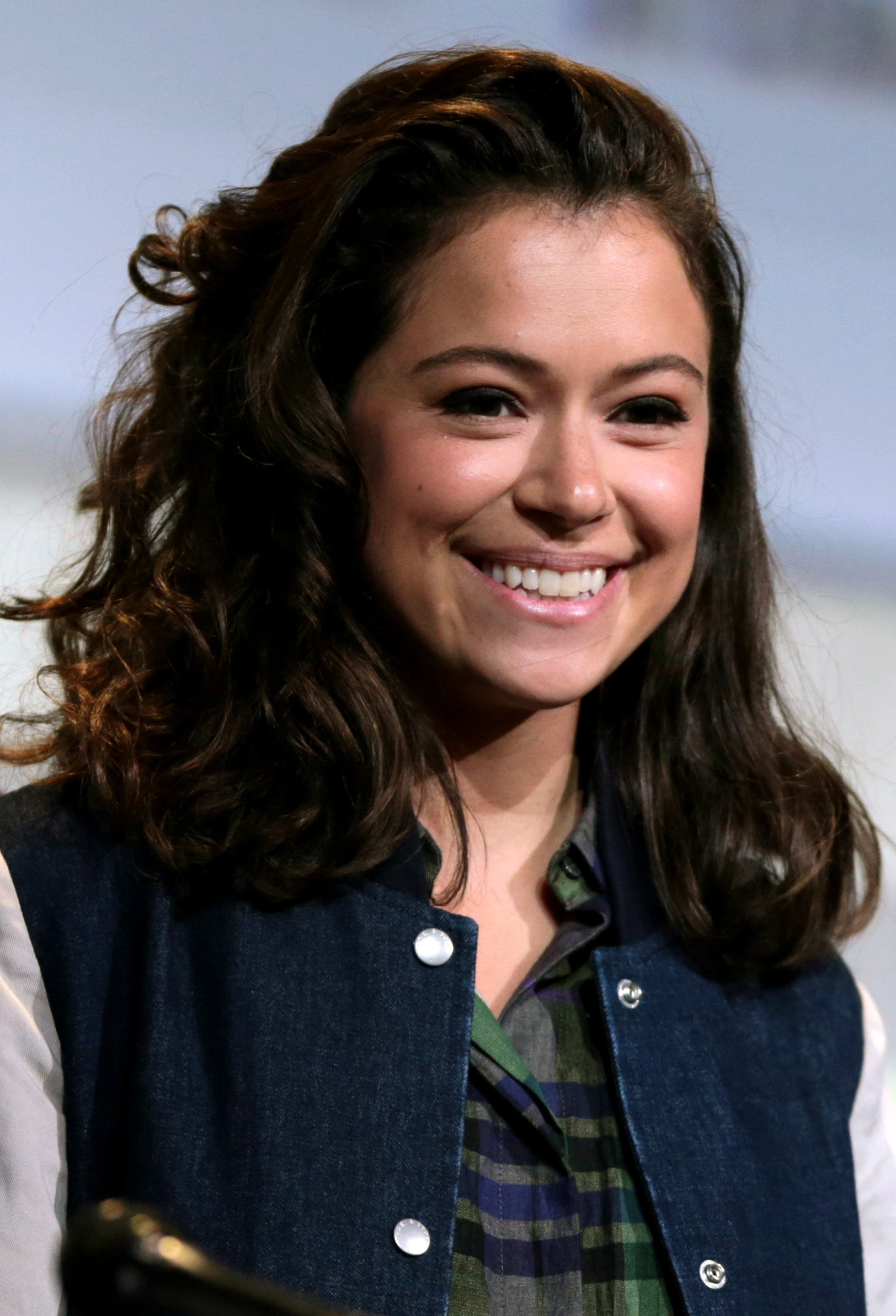
Tatiana Maslany, Best Actress in a Drama Series winner

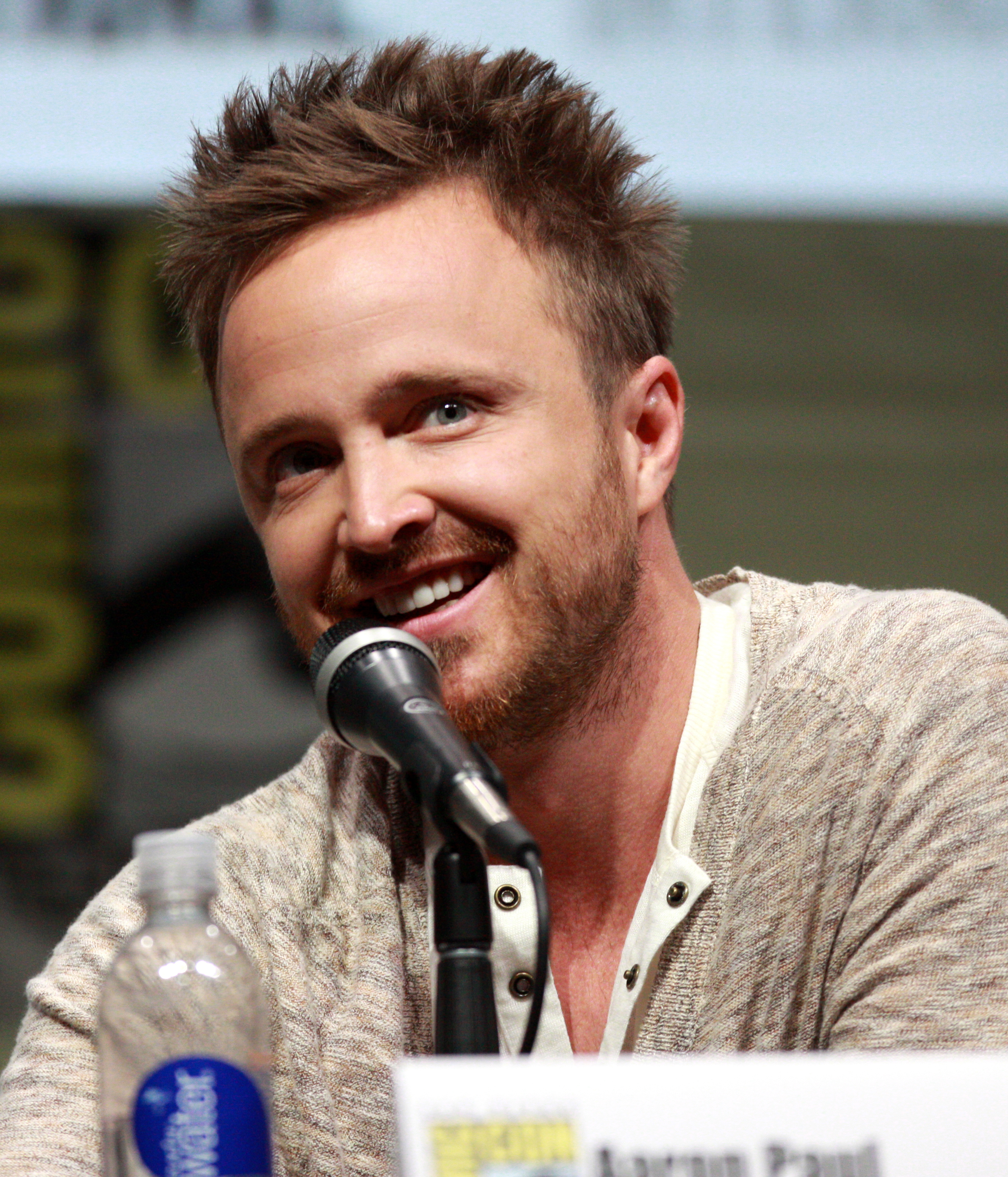
Aaron Paul, Best Supporting Actor in a Drama Series winner

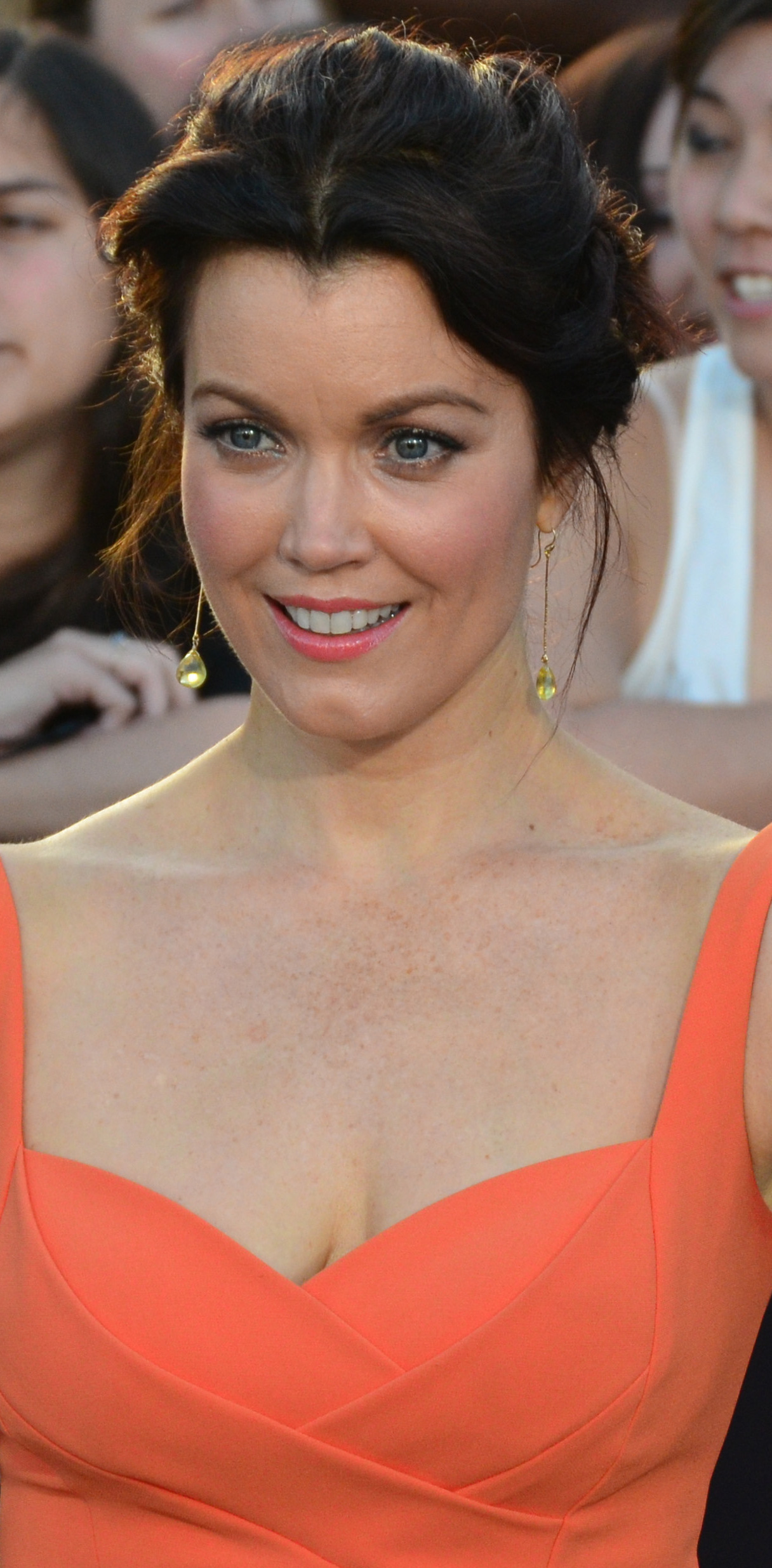
Bellamy Young, Best Supporting Actress in a Drama Series winner

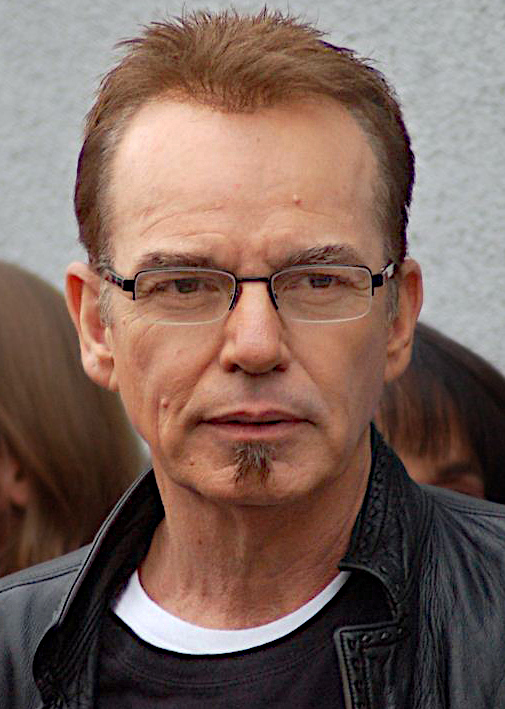
Billy Bob Thornton, Best Actor in a Movie/Miniseries winner

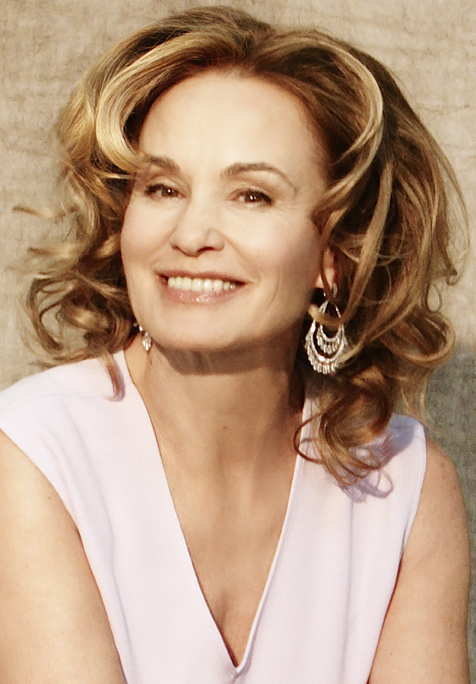
Jessica Lange, Best Actress in a Movie/Miniseries winner

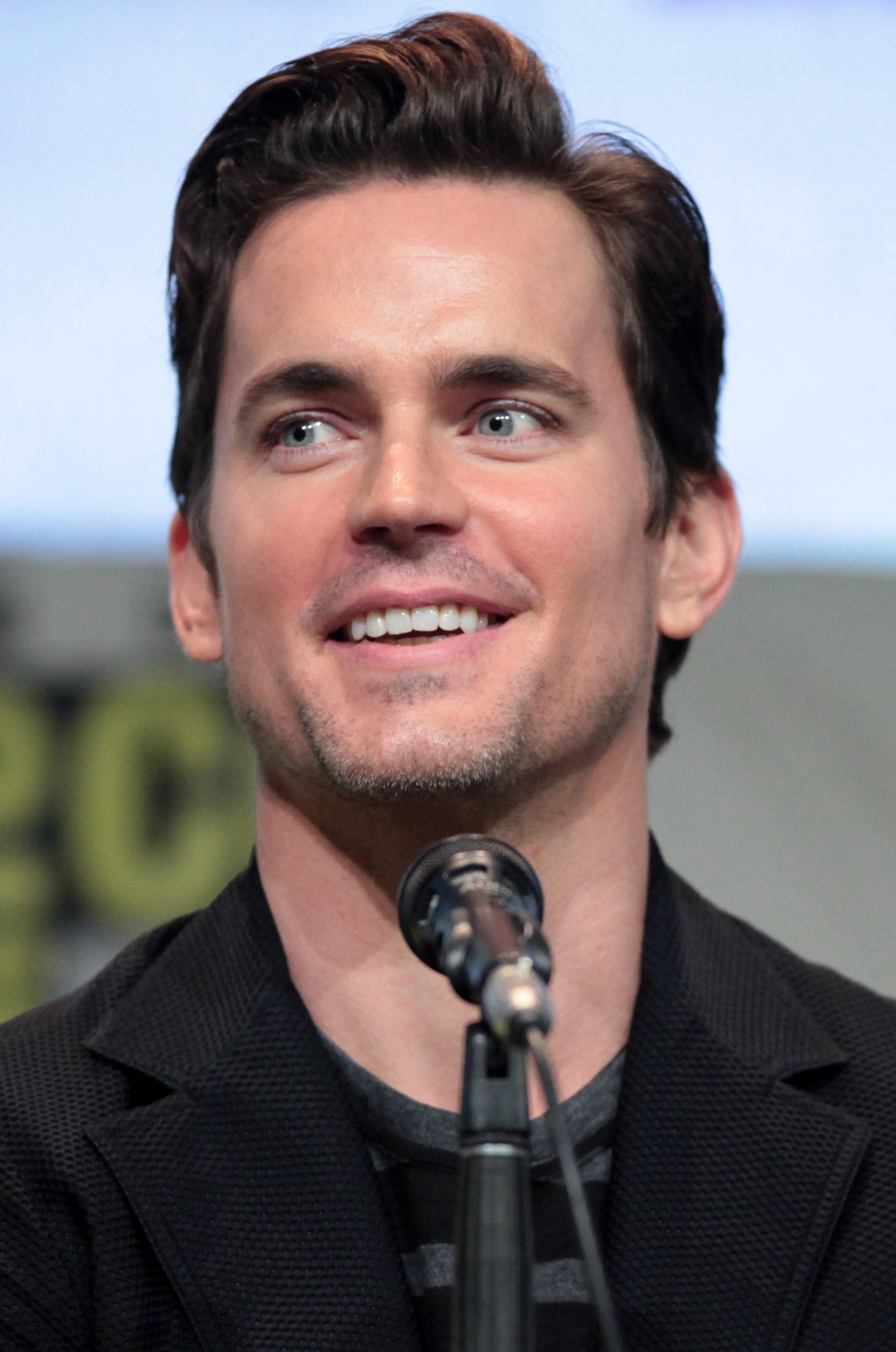
Matt Bomer, Best Supporting Actor in a Movie/Miniseries winner

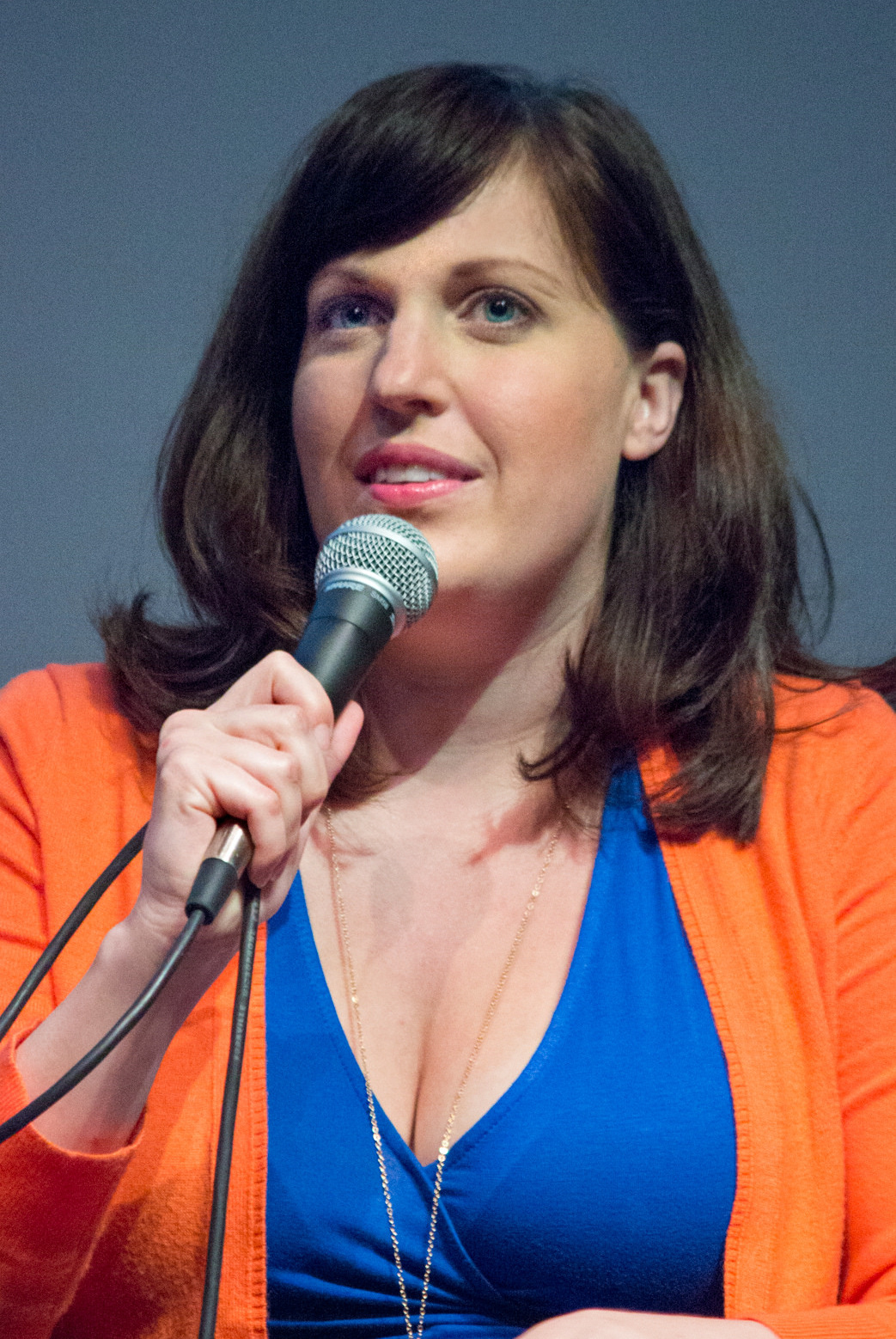
Allison Tolman, Best Supporting Actress in a Movie/Miniseries winner

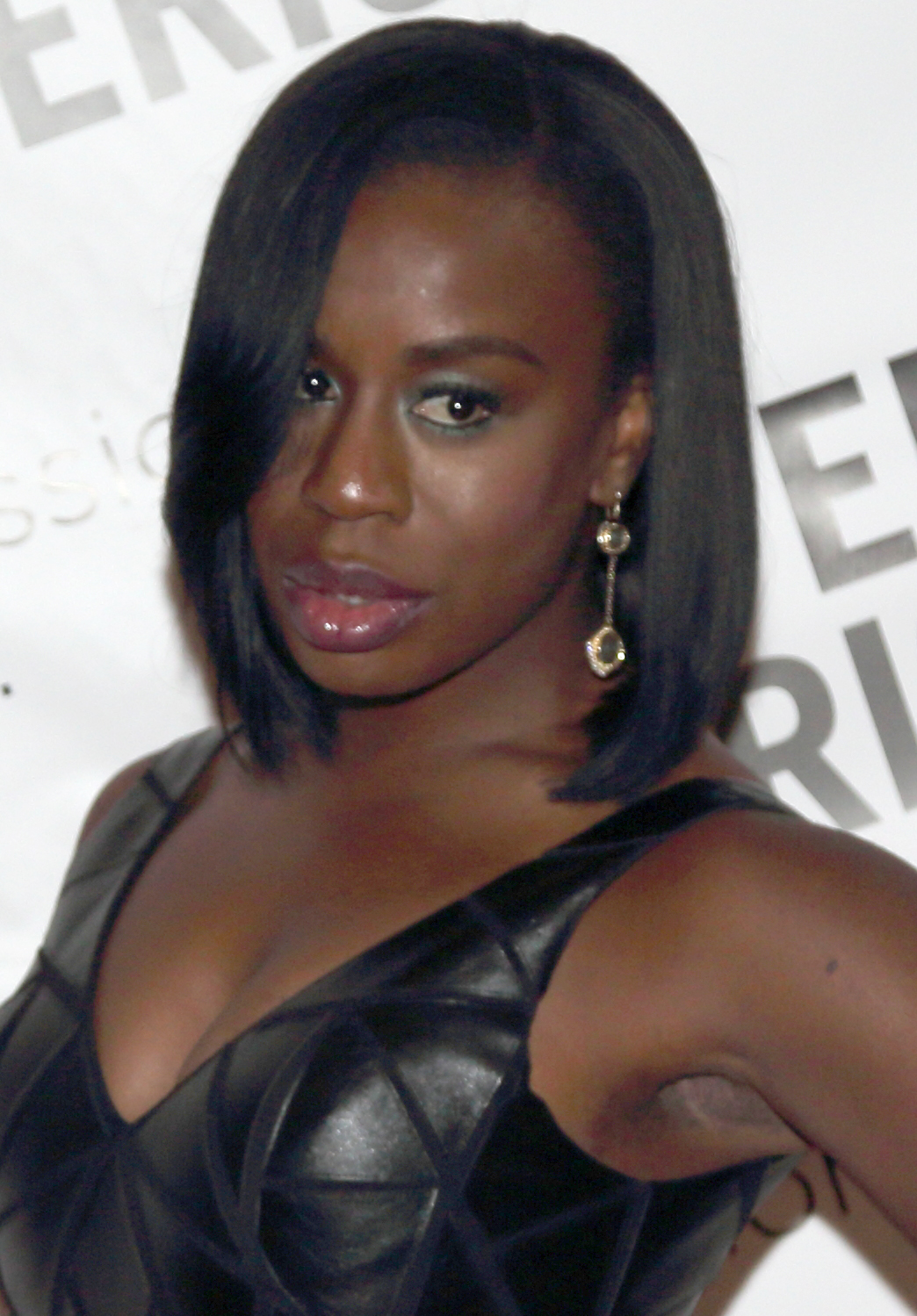
Uzo Aduba, Best Guest Performer in a Comedy Series winner

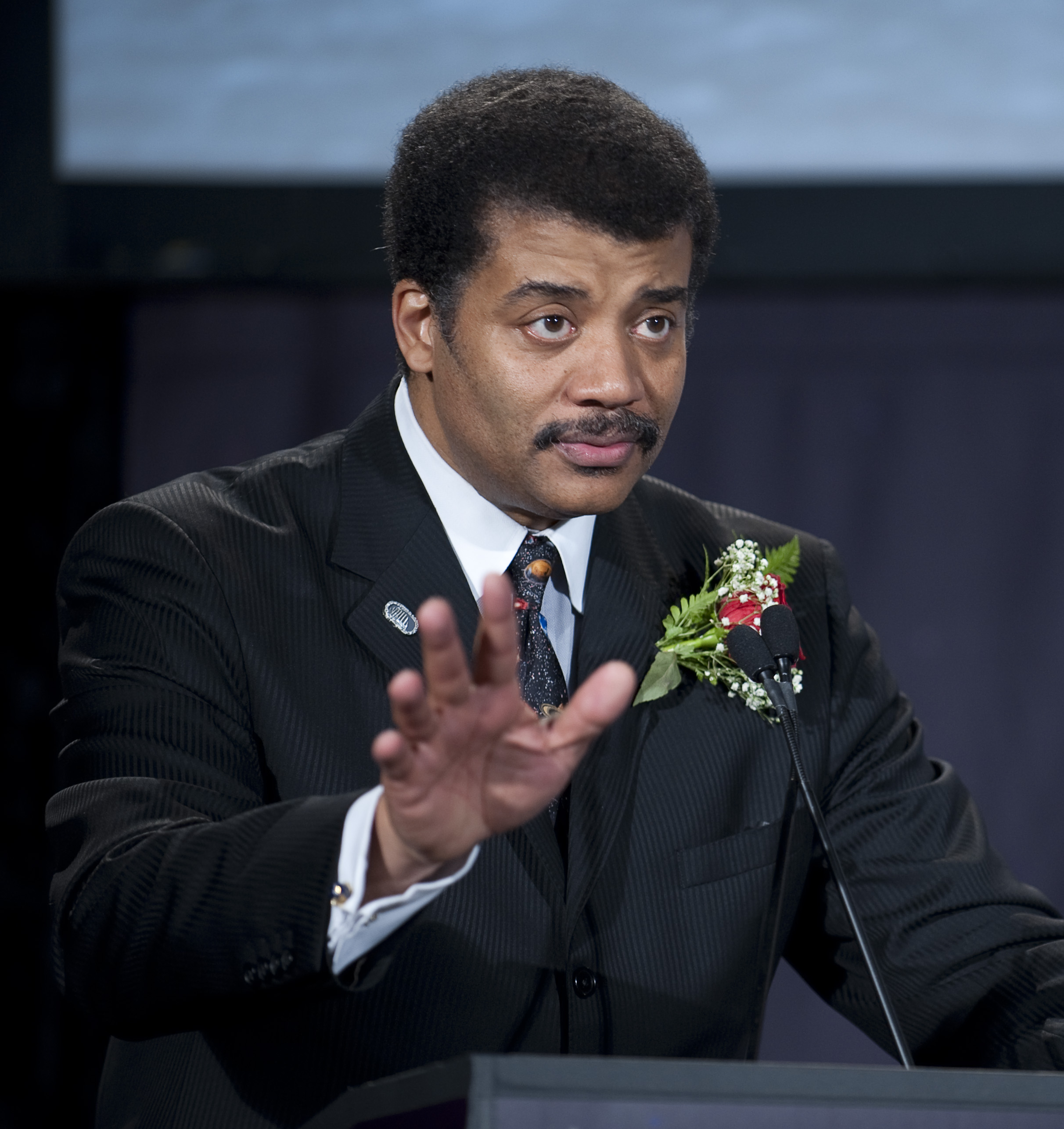
Neil deGrasse Tyson, Best Reality Show Host winner

Best Series
Best Comedy Series	Best Drama Series
**Orange Is the New Black (Netflix)**: The Big Bang Theory (CBS); Broad City (Comedy Central); Louie (FX); Silicon Valley (HBO); Veep (HBO)	**Breaking Bad (AMC)**: The Americans (FX); Game of Thrones (HBO); The Good Wife (CBS); Masters of Sex (Showtime); True Detective (HBO)
Best Movie	Best Miniseries
**The Normal Heart (HBO)**: An Adventure in Space and Time (BBC America); Burton & Taylor (BBC America); Killing Kennedy (Nat Geo); Sherlock: His Last Vow (PBS); The Trip to Bountiful (Lifetime)	**Fargo (FX)**: American Horror Story: Coven (FX); Bonnie & Clyde (A&E / History / Lifetime); Dancing on the Edge (Starz); The Hollow Crown (PBS); Luther (BBC America)
Best Animated Series	Most Exciting New Series (All Honored)
**Archer (FX)**: Adventure Time (Cartoon Network); Bob's Burgers (Fox); Family Guy (Fox); Phineas and Ferb (Disney Channel); The Simpsons (Fox)	Extant (CBS); Gotham (Fox); Halt and Catch Fire (AMC); The Leftovers (HBO); Outlander (Starz); Penny Dreadful (Showtime); The Strain (FX)
Best Acting in a Comedy Series
Best Actor	Best Actress
**Jim Parsons as Dr. Sheldon Cooper – The Big Bang Theory**: Louis C.K. as Louie – Louie; Chris Messina as Dr. Danny Castellano – The Mindy Project; Thomas Middleditch as Richard Hendriks – Silicon Valley; Adam Scott as Ben Wyatt – Parks and Recreation; Robin Williams as Simon Roberts – The Crazy Ones	**Julia Louis-Dreyfus as Selina Meyer – Veep**: Ilana Glazer as Ilana Wexler – Broad City; Wendi McLendon-Covey as Beverly Goldberg – The Goldbergs; Amy Poehler as Leslie Knope – Parks and Recreation; Emmy Rossum as Fiona Gallagher – Shameless; Amy Schumer as Various Characters – Inside Amy Schumer
Best Supporting Actor	Best Supporting Actress
**Andre Braugher as Capt. Ray Holt – Brooklyn Nine-Nine**: Keith David as Command Sergeant Major Donald Cody – Enlisted; Tony Hale as Gary Walsh – Veep; Albert Tsai as Bert Harrison – Trophy Wife; Christopher Evan Welch as Peter Gregory – Silicon Valley; Jeremy Allen White as Phillip "Lip" Gallagher – Shameless	**Allison Janney as Bonnie Plunkett – Mom (TIE)**; **Kate Mulgrew as Galina "Red" Reznikov – Orange Is the New Black (TIE)**: Mayim Bialik as Dr. Amy Farrah Fowler – The Big Bang Theory; Laverne Cox as Sophia Burset – Orange Is the New Black; Kaley Cuoco as Penny – The Big Bang Theory; Merritt Wever as Zoey Barkow, RN – Nurse Jackie
Best Acting in a Drama Series
Best Actor	Best Actress
**Matthew McConaughey as Det. Rustin "Rust" Cohle – True Detective**: Bryan Cranston as Walter White – Breaking Bad; Hugh Dancy as Will Graham – Hannibal; Freddie Highmore as Norman Bates – Bates Motel; Matthew Rhys as Philip Jennings – The Americans; Michael Sheen as Dr. William Masters – Masters of Sex	**Tatiana Maslany as Various Characters – Orphan Black**: Lizzy Caplan as Dr. Virginia Johnson – Masters of Sex; Vera Farmiga as Norma Bates – Bates Motel; Julianna Margulies as Alicia Florrick – The Good Wife; Keri Russell as Elizabeth Jennings – The Americans; Robin Wright as Claire Underwood – House of Cards
Best Supporting Actor	Best Supporting Actress
**Aaron Paul as Jesse Pinkman – Breaking Bad**: Josh Charles as Will Gardner – The Good Wife; Walton Goggins as Boyd Crowder – Justified; Peter Sarsgaard as Ray Seward – The Killing; Jon Voight as Mickey Donovan – Ray Donovan; Jeffrey Wright as Dr. Valentin Narcisse – Boardwalk Empire	**Bellamy Young as First Lady Melody "Mellie" Grant – Scandal**: Christine Baranski as Diane Lockhart – The Good Wife; Anna Gunn as Skyler White – Breaking Bad; Annet Mahendru as Nina Sergeevna – The Americans; Melissa McBride as Carol Peletier – The Walking Dead; Maggie Siff as Dr. Tara Knowles-Teller – Sons of Anarchy
Best Acting in a Movie/Miniseries
Best Actor	Best Actress
**Billy Bob Thornton as Lorne Malvo – Fargo**: David Bradley as William Hartnell – An Adventure in Space and Time; Benedict Cumberbatch as Sherlock Holmes – Sherlock: His Last Vow; Chiwetel Ejiofor as Louis Lester – Dancing on the Edge; Martin Freeman as Lester Nygaard – Fargo; Mark Ruffalo as Ned Weeks – The Normal Heart	**Jessica Lange as Fiona Goode – American Horror Story: Coven**: Helena Bonham Carter as Elizabeth Taylor – Burton & Taylor; Minnie Driver as Maggie Royal – Return to Zero; Whoopi Goldberg as Viola – A Day Late and a Dollar Short; Holliday Grainger as Bonnie Parker – Bonnie & Clyde; Cicely Tyson as Mrs. Carrie Watts – The Trip to Bountiful
Best Supporting Actor	Best Supporting Actress
**Matt Bomer as Felix Turner – The Normal Heart**: Warren Brown as Justin Ripley – Luther; Martin Freeman as Dr. Watson – Sherlock: His Last Vow; Colin Hanks as Officer Gus Grimly – Fargo; Joe Mantello as Mickey Marcus – The Normal Heart; Blair Underwood as Ludie Watts – The Trip to Bountiful	**Allison Tolman as Deputy Molly Solverson – Fargo**: Amanda Abbington as Mary Watson – Sherlock: His Last Vow; Kathy Bates as Delphine LaLaurie – American Horror Story: Coven; Ellen Burstyn as Olivia Foxworth – Flowers in the Attic; Jessica Raine as Verity Lambert – An Adventure in Space and Time; Julia Roberts as Dr. Emma Brookner – The Normal Heart
Best Guest Performing
Best Guest Performer – Comedy	Best Guest Performer – Drama
**Uzo Aduba as Suzanne "Crazy Eyes" Warren – Orange Is the New Black**: Sarah Baker as Vanessa – Louie; James Earl Jones as Himself – The Big Bang Theory; Mimi Kennedy as Marjorie Armstrong – Mom; Andrew Rannells as Elijah Krantz – Girls; Lauren Weedman as Doris – Looking	**Allison Janney as Margaret Scully – Masters of Sex**: Beau Bridges as Provost Barton Scully – Masters of Sex; Walton Goggins as Venus Van Dam – Sons of Anarchy; Joe Morton as Rowan "Eli" Pope – Scandal; Carrie Preston as Elsbeth Tascioni – The Good Wife; Diana Rigg as Lady Olenna Tyrell – Game of Thrones
Reality & Variety
Best Reality Series	Best Reality Series – Competition
**Cosmos: A Spacetime Odyssey (Fox / Nat Geo)**: Deadliest Catch (Discovery); Duck Dynasty (A&E); MythBusters (Discovery); Top Gear (History); Undercover Boss (CBS)	**Shark Tank (ABC)**: The Amazing Race (CBS); Project Runway (Lifetime); Survivor (CBS); Top Chef (Bravo); The Voice (NBC)
Best Talk Show	Best Reality Show Host
**The Tonight Show Starring Jimmy Fallon (NBC)**: Conan (TBS); The Colbert Report (Comedy Central); The Daily Show with Jon Stewart (Comedy Central); The Ellen DeGeneres Show (NBC); Jimmy Kimmel Live! (ABC)	**Neil deGrasse Tyson – Cosmos: A Spacetime Odyssey**: Tom Bergeron – Dancing with the Stars; Carson Daly – The Voice; Cat Deeley – So You Think You Can Dance; Gordon Ramsay – MasterChef; RuPaul – RuPaul's Drag Race

== Shows with multiple wins ==
The following shows received multiple awards:

Program	Network	Category	Wins
Fargo	FX	Miniseries	3
Orange Is the New Black	Netflix	Comedy	3
Breaking Bad	AMC	Drama	2
Cosmos: A Spacetime Odyssey	Fox/National Geographic	Reality	2
The Normal Heart	HBO	Movie	2

== Shows with multiple nominations ==
The following shows received multiple nominations:

Program	Network	Category	Nominations
The Big Bang Theory	CBS	Comedy	5
Fargo	FX	Miniseries	5
The Good Wife	CBS	Drama	5
Masters of Sex	Showtime	Drama	5
The Normal Heart	HBO	Movie	5
The Americans	FX	Drama	4
Breaking Bad	AMC	Drama	4
Orange Is the New Black	Netflix	Comedy	4
Sherlock: His Last Vow	PBS	Movie	4
American Horror Story: Coven	FX	Miniseries	3
An Adventure in Space and Time	BBC America	Movie	3
Louie	FX	Comedy	3
Silicon Valley	HBO	Comedy	3
The Trip to Bountiful	Lifetime	Movie	3
Veep	HBO	Comedy	3
Bates Motel	A&E	Drama	2
Bonnie & Clyde	A&E/History/Lifetime	Miniseries	2
Broad City	Comedy Central	Comedy	2
Burton & Taylor	BBC America	Movie	2
Cosmos: A Spacetime Odyssey	Fox/National Geographic	Reality	2
Dancing on the Edge	BBC America	Miniseries	2
Game of Thrones	HBO	Drama	2
Luther	BBC America	Miniseries	2
Mom	CBS	Comedy	2
Parks and Recreation	NBC	Comedy	2
Shameless (Note: Previously categorized as Drama)	Showtime	Comedy	2
Scandal	ABC	Drama	2
Sons of Anarchy	FX	Drama	2
True Detective	HBO	Drama	2
The Voice	NBC	Reality – Competition	2

== Presenters ==
- Christina Applegate
- Fred Armisen
- Scott Aukerman
- Demián Bichir
- Danielle Brooks
- Carrie Brownstein
- Lizzy Caplan
- Josh Dallas
- Kat Graham
- Max Greenfield
- Kathy Griffin
- Tony Hale
- Colin Hanks
- Angie Harmon
- Colton Haynes
- Diane Kruger
- Natasha Lyonne
- Elisabeth Moss
- Kunal Nayyar
- Adam Pally
- Jim Parsons
- Laura Prepon
- Matthew Rhys
- Gina Rodriguez
- Emmy Rossum
- Isaiah Washington
- Shane West
