= KP Technology =

- Industry: Scientific instrumentation
- Founded: 2000
- Founder: Professor Iain Baikie
- Headquarters: Wick, Scotland
- Key people: Professor Iain Baikie, CEO
- Products: Kelvin probes and photoemission spectroscopy systems
- Website: www.kelvinprobe.com

KP Technology Ltd is a Scottish manufacturer of scientific instruments based in Wick, Caithness. Founded in 2000 by physicist Iain Baikie, the company develops and manufactures instruments for surface analysis, including Kelvin probes and ambient-pressure photoemission spectroscopy systems.

== History ==
KP Technology was founded in Wick in 2000 by Iain Baikie to develop and commercialise instruments for surface research.

The company has reported working with research institutions and organisations including CERN, the European Space Agency and the University of St Andrews.

The company has won two Queens Awards and a John Logie Baird Award for Impact through Innovation.

== Notable projects ==
KP Technology developed a NASA Probe.

== Scottish Parliament motion ==
A motion was passed in the Scottish Parliament congratulating the company.

"That the parliament congratulates business across Scotland and in particular those in the Highlands and Islands who have scooped the Queens Awards for outstanding achievement; notes that KP Technology Ltd of Wick which manufactures and sells Kelvin Probes used to measure Electronic Work Function received an award; notes the firms have significantly increased their export sales over the past few years and are international success storys that are bucking the economic trend across Scotland and the U.K."
