= ONETEP =

ONETEP (Order-N Electronic Total Energy Package) is a linear-scaling density functional theory software package able to run on parallel computers. It uses a basis of non-orthogonal generalized Wannier functions (NGWFs) expressed in terms of periodic cardinal sine (psinc) functions, which are in turn equivalent to a basis of plane-waves. ONETEP therefore combines the advantages of the plane-wave approach (controllable accuracy and variational convergence of the total energy with respect to the size of the basis) with computational effort that scales linearly with the size of the system. The ONETEP approach involves simultaneous optimization of the density kernel (a generalization of occupation numbers to non-orthogonal basis, which represents the density matrix in the basis of NGWFs) and the NGWFs themselves. The optimized NGWFs then provide a minimal localized basis set, which can be considerably smaller in size, but of equal or higher accuracy, than the unoptimized basis sets used in most linear-scaling approaches.

ONETEP has been developed by a UK-centric group of academics based at the universities of Cambridge, Southampton, Warwick, Imperial College London and Gdańsk University of Technology. It is available to academics at a reduced rate, and licenses can be obtained for non-academic usage from the developers or through Accelrys' Materials Studio package. The latest academic version 8.0 was released on 29 December 2025.

== See also ==
- Density functional theory
- Quantum chemistry computer programs
