= Unlisted Securities Market =

The Unlisted Securities Market (USM), which ran from 1980 to 1996, was a stock exchange set up by the London Stock Exchange to cater for companies too small to qualify for a full listing.

The USM allowed companies to be traded which did not have the full three-year trading history required by the main market, or which wished to float less than 25 percent of their share capital. The USM allowed as little as 10% to be floated.

The Alternative Investment Market (AIM) was set up in June 1995. The USM no longer accepted new introductions, and companies which were already quoted on the USM had twelve months to decide either to move the quotation to AIM, or to delist.
