= Renishaw plc =

British engineering company

- Type: Public
- Traded as: LSE: RSW; FTSE 250 component
- Industry: Engineering
- Founded: 1973
- Founders: Sir David McMurtry; John Deer
- Headquarters: Wotton-under-Edge, England
- Key people: John Deer (Deputy Chairman); Will Lee (Chief Executive)
- Revenue: ▲£815.8 million (2026)
- Operating income: ▲£152.9 million (2026)
- Net income: ▲£119.0 million (2026)
- Website: www.renishaw.com

Renishaw plc is a British engineering company based in Wotton-under-Edge, England. The company's products include coordinate-measuring machines and machine tool products. It is listed on the London Stock Exchange and is a constituent of the FTSE 250 Index.

== History ==
The company was founded by Sir David McMurtry and John Deer in 1973. McMurtry had needed to measure fuel pipes on a prototype jet engine: at the time, coordinate-measuring machine sensors featured rigid styli, which required manual positioning on the surface and which yielded poor repeatability when measuring delicate components. To meet this need, McMurtry invented a touch-trigger probe device, which he then patented. The probe featured an elegant 'kinematic' location for a spring-loaded stylus, providing a highly repeatable seated position for the stylus combined with the compliance needed to measure such components.

Renishaw floated on the Unlisted Securities Market in 1983, and gained a full listing on the London Stock Exchange in November 1984. In 2006, the Company bought 'itp', a German manufacturer of precision styli. In early 2009, the global recession reached Renishaw, resulting in a large proportion of the workforce being placed "at risk".

In 2010, Renishaw bought a stake (and subsequently took complete control) of Measuring Devices Ltd, a company providing a range of services in the field of surveying equipment. In 2011, Renishaw purchased the 400,000 sq ft Bosch plant in Miskin, Wales.

== Operations ==
The company's product portfolio includes touch probes for CNC machine tools, calibration systems that optimise the performance of CNC machinery, linear encoder systems, rotary encoder systems, additive manufacturing machines, dental CAD/CAM systems, Raman spectroscopy and medical devices for functional neurosurgery applications.

== Locations ==
Renishaw's main offices are situated in an old watermill, together with several new buildings, on a 26-acre (110,000 m^{2}) site, near Nailsworth, Gloucestershire. The company has a machine shop located at Stonehouse, Gloucestershire, and an assembly facility at Woodchester, both near Stroud. There are further assembly facilities in Dublin (Ireland) and Pune (India). Renishaw also has research facilities located in Wotton-under-Edge, Edinburgh and Ljubljana.

== Sale of Renishaw ==
On 2 March 2021, David McMurtry and John Deer indicated that they wished to dispose of their entire holdings in Renishaw, comprising some 53% of the shares, as 'we recognise that neither of us is getting any younger'. The Renishaw board then announced that it was launching a formal sale process for the entire company. This process was terminated on 7 July 2021, the board concluding that none of the proposals met their objectives.
