= Baker Street Babes =

Podcast about Sherlock Holmes

- Available in: English
- Creator: Kristina Manente
- Website: bakerstreetbabes.com

Baker Street Babes is an-all female Sherlockian group who host the web's first all-female Sherlock Holmes podcast. There are eleven members of the group, including Edgar Award-nominated author Lyndsay Faye, a collective devoid of a president or a leader. They consider themselves "a bridge between older Sherlockians and young, tech-savvy enthusiasts", and they have been described as being "at the center of online Sherlock fandom".

The various members of the group are active in podcasting, blogging, and Tumblr.

== Podcast ==
The podcast began in May 2011 and initially consisted of Kristina Manente, Ardy from Germany and Katherine from England. The group has since added eight other members from various locations around the world including United States and France.

There have been 85 episodes as of the end of 2018 covering various aspects of Sherlockiana and Sherlock fandom including interviews with New York Times bestselling author Laurie R. King, actress Lara Pulver who plays Irene Adler on the BBC's Sherlock, and actress Amanda Abbington who plays Mary Morstan on Sherlock.

They were finalists for a podcaster award at the 6th Annual Shorty Awards in 2014.

== Activities ==
At the 2013 San Diego Comic-Con, the Baker Street Babes co-hosted "SherlockeDCC" which featured attendees Mark Gatiss, Sue Vertue, and Steven Moffat.

Two members were interviewed on NBC’s The Today Show in 2012.

The Baker Street Babes organized a "well-attended dinner" at the 2014 annual Sherlock Holmes celebration held in Manhattan by The Baker Street Irregulars and hosted a costume ball at the 2018 celebration.

== Sources ==
- Boström, Mattias (2018). From Holmes to Sherlock. Mysterious Press. ISBN 978-0-8021-2789-1.
- Britt, Ryan (August 29, 2016). "The First Modern Fandom Brought Sherlock Holmes Back from the Dead". Inverse.
- Claire, Nancy (September 15, 2013). "Sherlockian Girl Goes Wilde: An Interview with Lyndsay Faye". Los Angeles Review of Books.
- Dundas, Zach (2015). The Great Detective. Mariner Books. ISBN 978-0-544-70521-0.
- Granshaw, Lisa (December 4, 2013). "Meet the Baker Street Babes, the first all-female Sherlock Holmes podcast". The Daily Dot.
- Kilgannon, Corey (January 14, 2018). "It's Elementary: Sherlockians Take Manhattan". The New York Times. Archived from the original on February 3, 2018.
- Lee, Ashley (February 24, 2014). "Justin Bieber, Lena Dunham, Jimmy Fallon Among Shorty Awards Finalists (Exclusive)". The Hollywood Reporter.
- Lena, Amber (July 25, 2013). "SDCC 2013: Surprises And Scripts at SherlockeDCC". MTV. Archived from the original on March 2, 2015.
- Schuessler, Jennifer (March 6, 2013). "Suit Says Sherlock Belongs to the Ages". The New York Times.
