= The Great Detective (book) =

Book by Zach Dundas

The Great Detective: The Amazing Rise and Immortal Life of Sherlock Holmes
- First edition
- Author: Zach Dundas
- Language: English
- Genre: Nonfiction
- Publisher: Houghton Mifflin Harcourt
- Publication place: United States
- Media type: Print (hardback and paperback)
- Pages: 336
- ISBN: 978-0544214040 1st edition, hardcover

The Great Detective: The Amazing Rise and Immortal Life of Sherlock Holmes is a non-fiction book by Zach Dundas about Sherlock Holmes.

The book begins with the author's personal visit to the Sherlock Holmes Museum and then progresses chronologically through an exploration of Sherlock Holmes fandom, Sherlockian Societies such as The Baker Street Irregulars, and the Sherlockian game

== Reception ==
Julia Knaus, writing for Transformative Works and Cultures, called the work "a fascinating read". Clea Simon of The Boston Globe appreciated the scholarship but found Dundas' use of personal memoir as framing device to be "the least interesting thread". Kirkus Reviews called it "A bright read for Sherlock's fans". Leslie S. Klinger, writing for the Los Angeles Review of Books, found Dundas' account of Holmesian history "skillful" and said the book "feels like a long conversation with a new friend".

== See also ==
- From Holmes to Sherlock
