= Peter Calamai =

Canadian science journalist

Peter Calamai CM (June 23, 1943 – January 22, 2019) was an American-born Canadian science journalist.

== Early life and education ==
Calamai was born in Berwick, Pennsylvania, the son of engineer Enrico Calamai and Jean Kennedy, and older brother to Michael and Paul. He moved to Brantford, Ontario as a child. He earned a Bachelor of Science in physics from McMaster University in 1965. While at McMaster, he was editor-in-chief of the student newspaper, The Silhouette, which won several national awards under his leadership.

== Career ==
As a journalist, Calamai started as a local reporter at the Brantford Expositor, then The Hamilton Spectator. He joined Southam News in the early 1970s as a parliamentary specialist and foreign correspondent in London, Nairobi, and Washington, before joining the Ottawa Citizen as an editorial pages editor in 1990. In 1996, Conrad Black bought the Citizen's parent company, Southam, and shortly thereafter fired Calamai and his colleague, Jim Travers.

From 1998 to 2008, Calamai was the chief science editor at the Toronto Star. While at the Star, he was the first science reporter invited aboard the CCGS Amundsen, where he championed the importance of observing Earth Hour and wrote a series debunking the claims of climate change deniers.

As an academic, he was a Southam Fellow at Massey College in 1982–83, the Max Bell chair at the University of Regina School of Journalism in 1985–86, and a visiting associate professor in 1997–98 and adjunct research professor since 2001 at the Carleton University School of Journalism and Communication, teaching as a sessional instructor and supervising numerous theses.

He was a founding member of the Canadian Science Writers' Association, founding director of the Science Media Centre of Canada, Fellow of the Canadian Association of Physicists, and Fellow of the Institute for Science, Society and Policy at the University of Ottawa. He also served as a member of advisory boards to Environment Canada, NSERC, and the Canadian Language and Literacy Research Network.

== Personal life ==
Calamai was an avid fan of Sherlock Holmes and was heavily involved with The Bootmakers of Toronto and The Baker Street Irregulars, literary societies devoted to the fictional character.

His other interests included conchology (with a specialization in the cowry), ornithology, astronomy, the genetic engineering of tomatoes, choir, tennis, and golf.

He died on January 22, 2019, at his home in Stratford, Ontario, after a period of heart-related health problems.

== Awards ==
Calamai won three National Newspaper Awards: in the Long Feature (William Southam Award; formerly Feature Writing) category in 1981, and in the Breaking News (formerly Spot News Reporting) category in 1984 and 1985.

He won a Michener Award in 1987 for public interest journalism for his work overseeing a massive investigation series on adult literacy in Canada. The next year, then prime minister Brian Mulroney officially launched the National Literacy Secretariat, and one year after that, Statistics Canada launched the first of its national literacy surveys.

In 2008, he was awarded the CAP-COMP Peter Kirkby Memorial Medal for Outstanding Service to Canadian Physics, "for his exemplary communication of science to the public, for his dedication to the promotion of science through the media, and for his advocacy for science in Canada." The same year, he also received the Award for Distinguished Science Journalism in the Atmospheric and Related Sciences from the American Meteorological Society, "[f]or a four-part series on Arctic atmospheric research that captures the complexity of the science and takes the reader on a descriptive journey to one of the remotest parts of the globe."

In 2012, he received the Queen Elizabeth II Diamond Jubilee Medal.

In 2014, he was named as a Member of the Order of Canada, before being invested in 2016, "[f]or his achievements as a science journalist and for his contributions to the cause of literacy."

He was inducted into the McMaster Alumni Gallery in 1982 and received an honorary Doctor of Science degree from the university in 2015.
