= List of Holmesian studies =

This list contains studies about the Sherlock Holmes character, biographies of Arthur Conan Doyle and studies about his Holmesian work, the place of Sherlock Holmes character in detective literature, and other Holmes miscellanea.

== Holmesian biographies ==
- Baring-Gould, William (1962). Sherlock Holmes: A Biography of the World's First Consulting Detective.
- Blakeney, Thomas S. (1993). Sherlock Holmes: Fact or Fiction?. Otto Penzler Books.
- Blegin, Theodore Christian & McDiarmid, Errett Weir McDiarmid (1952). Sherlock Holmes: Master Detective.
- Keating, H. R. F. (2006). Sherlock Holmes: The Man and His World. Book Sales.
- Mauméjean, Xavier; Ruaud, André-François. Les nombreuses vies de Sherlock Holmes. Alleged – and "exhaustive" – biography of Holmes with short stories from various authors.
- Rennison, Nick (2006). Sherlock Holmes: The Unauthorized Biography.

== Holmesian books ==
- Anderson, Marlow (2004). Sherlock Holmes in Babylon and Other Tales of Mathematical History.
- Berger, Arthur (2003). Durkheim Is Dead! - A Sherlock Holmes Mystery of Social Theory. AltaMira Press. Editor's note: In this sociology textbook/mystery novel, students can join Sherlock Holmes and Watson as they discover a new area ripe for acrimony and intrigue: Social theory. In 1910, the most prominent social theorists in the world gather in London for a conference on the new science of sociology. Things rapidly fall apart, though, as a fight breaks out, a jewel is stolen, and famous sociologist Emile Durkheim disappears. As Sherlock Holmes and Watson investigate, it appears that social theory may not only explain actions--in this case, it may be the cause of them. So Holmes and Watson investigate social theory itself, learning directly from those creating it: W. E. B. Du Bois, Sigmund Freud, Vladimir Lenin, Beatrice Webb, Georg Simmel, Emile Durkheim, and Max Weber. The theories, lives, and passions of each sociologist are revealed as Holmes and Watson learn first-hand just how influential social theory can be.
- Bruce, Colin (1998). Einstein Paradox - And Other Science Mysteries Solved by Sherlock Holmes. Basic Books.
- Butler, Eamonn & Pirie, Madsen (1996). The Sherlock Holmes IQ Book (amateur sleuth game book). Carroll & Graf Publishers. Editor's note: Taken from such works a "A Study in Scarlet", "The Sign of the Four", "The Hound of the Baskervilles", and The Case Book of Sherlock Holmes, 72 puzzles challenged the reader's abilities in language, math, codes, and, of course, deductive reasoning. Dr. Watson retells each story and, at the end, Holmes poses a new conundrum relating to the adventure.
- Hardwick, Michael (1986). The Complete Guide to Sherlock Holmes'. George Weidenfeld & Nicolson.. Offers entertaining digests of each tale and includes lists of characters, quotations, and unchronicled cases.
- Kaska, Kathleen (2000). The Sherlock Holmes Triviography and Quiz Book. Taylor.
- Rennison, Nick. Rivals of Sherlock Holmes. A collection of stories from the period from 1890 to 1914 featuring many of the sleuths inspired by the success of Arthur Conan Doyle's Holmes stories. (Includes stories by Jacque Futrelle, William Hope Hodgson, Hesketh Prichard, Arthur Reeve, and others).
- Riley, Dick (1998). The Bedside, Bathtub & Armchair Companion to Sherlock Holmes. Continuum International Publishing Group, Limited.

== Holmesian studies ==
- Bayard, Pierre (2007). Sherlock Holmes was Wrong: Re-opening the Case of the "Hound of the Baskervilles".. A recent psychoanalytic re-investigation of the case of The Hound of the Baskervilles.
- Conan Doyle, Arthur; Baring-Gould, William Stuart (1988). The annotated Sherlock Holmes: the four novels and the fifty-six short stories complete. Volumes =1&2. C.N. Potter. (OE 1967).
- Conan Doyle, Arthur; Klinger, Leslie S. (2004). The New Annotated Sherlock Holmes: The Complete Short Stories. Norton/QPB. Editor's Note: "Leslie Klinger, a leading authority on the world's most famous detective, reassembles in "The Complete Short Stories" the Arthur Conan Doyle's 56 canonical short stories in the order in which they were anthologized between 1892 and 1927, along with more than 700 period illustrations and some 2,000 footnotes in the margins, on everything from the Boer War to the rules of rugby, and how a "spirit case" worked."
- Conan Doyle, Arthur; Klinger, Leslie S. (2005). The New Annotated Sherlock Holmes: The Novels. Norton/QPB. Editor' Note: The third volume collects the four Holmes novels, with another 300 period illustrations and 1,000 footnotes.
- De Waal, Ronald (1974). The World Bibliography of Sherlock Holmes and DR. Watson - a classified and annoted list of materials relating to Their lives and adventures. Bramhall House. And subsequent editions (the last in 1995).
- De Waal, Ronald Burt (1980). The international Sherlock Holmes: a companion volume to The world bibliography of Sherlock Holmes and Dr. Watson. Archon Books.
- Hardwick, Mollie (1962). The Sherlock Holmes Companion. J. Murray.
- López Aroca, Alberto (2007). Sherlock Holmes y lo Outré (in Spanish). Archived from the original on 2011-07-16. Spanish studies on diverse Sherlockian subjects.
- Mellier, Denis (1999). Sherlock Holmes et le signe de la fiction (Collection Signes (Fontenay-aux-Roses) ed.). ENS Éditions.
- Putney, Charles R.; Cutshall King, Joseph A. & Sugarman, Sally (1996). Sherlock Holmes: Victorian Sleuth to Modern Hero. Scarecrow Press.
- Redmond, Christopher. In Bed With Sherlock Holmes: Sexual Elements in Arthur Conan Doyle's Stories of the great Detective. Dundurn Press Ltd. ISBN 978-0889241428.
- Verne de Albacete, Jules (2006). Cuaderno de bitácora del Matilda Briggs (in Spanish). Academia de Mitología Creativa.
- Wagner, E. J. (April 20, 2007). The Science of Sherlock Holmes: From Baskerville Hall to the Valley of Fear, the Real Forensics Behind the Great Detective's Greatest Cases. Wiley. ISBN 978-0-471-64879-6.
- Watt, Peter Ridgway; Green, Joseph (February 2014). The Alternative Sherlock Holmes - Pastiches, Parodies and Copies. Ashgate Publishing, Ltd.

== Holmesian Victoriana ==
- Chesney, Kellow (1970). The Victorian Underworld. Smith, Maurice Temple.
- Cornwell, Patricia (2002). Portrait of a Killer: Jack the Ripper - Case closed. J.P.Putnam's Sons - Penguin Putnam. ISBN 978-0-399-14932-0.
- Evans, Stewart P. (2004). The Executioner - The Chronicles of a Victorian Hangman. Sutton Publishing. Annoted journal of James Berry, the hangman of the latter half of Queen's Victoria reign.
- Harrison, Michael (1973). The World of Sherlock Holmes. Frederik Muller Ltd. Study of the Victorian historical background of Sherlock Holmes's lifetime.
- Lowndes, Marie Belloc (1913). The Lodger (A Jack the Ripper novelized study). Methuen & Co. Ltd.
- Mayher, Henry (1892). "London's Underworld: from Those that Will Not Work". London Labour and the London Poor. 4. Spring Book 1950.
- Oates, Jonathan (2007). Unsolved Murders in Victorian & Edwardian London. Wharncliffe Books.

== Arthur Conan Doyle related books ==
- Barnes, Julian (2006). Arthur & George. ISBN 978-0-7862-8665-2.
- Costello, Peter (1991). Conan Doyle Detective - The Crimes Investigated by the Creator of Sherlock Holmes. Constable & Robinson Ltd.
- Louit, Robert Louit (1987). "Sherlock Holmes: le dossier Conan Doyle". Magazine littéraire. No. 241. [Analytical entry]
- Lycett, Andrew (December 18, 2007). The Man Who Created Sherlock Holmes: The Life and Times of Sir Arthur Conan Doyle. Free Press. ISBN 978-0-7432-7523-1.

== Other related studies ==
- Barnes, Alan (2011). Sherlock Holmes on Screen. Titan Books. ISBN 9780857687760. Sherlock Holmes has appeared on screen more times than any other fictional character. This guide covers more than a century's worth of his exploits on film and television.
