= Sherlock Holmes fandom =

Community of fans of the works of Arthur Conan Doyle

Sherlock Holmes fandom is an international, informal community of fans of the stories by Arthur Conan Doyle featuring the fictional detective Sherlock Holmes. The fans are known as Sherlockians or Holmesians. Many fans of Sherlock Holmes participate in societies around the world, and engage in a variety of activities such as discussion, tourism, and collecting.

== History ==
Fans of the literary detective Sherlock Holmes are widely considered to have comprised the first modern fandom, holding public demonstrations of mourning after Holmes was "killed off" in 1893, and creating some of the first fan fiction as early as about 1897 to 1902.

Fans often play the Sherlockian game, analyzing the stories under the premise that Sherlock Holmes and Dr. Watson were real people and Conan Doyle was merely Watson's literary agent. Many authors have authored "biographies" of Sherlock Holmes such as William S. Baring-Gould's Sherlock Holmes of Baker Street (1962) and Nick Rennison's Sherlock Holmes: The Unauthorized Biography (2005).

Various cookbooks with a Victorian era Sherlockian theme have been published over the years. 1976 brought both Dining with Sherlock Holmes: A Baker Street Cookbook by Julia Rosenblatt and Frederic H. Sonnenschmidt as well as Sherlock Holmes Cookbook by Sean M. Wright and John Farrell. The latter two authors have both received investitures in The Baker Street Irregulars. William Bonnell authored The Sherlock Holmes Victorian Cookbook in 1997.

Cosplay is often an aspect of Sherlockian fandom with a Sherlock Cosplay World Record attempted at UCL in 2014.

Elements of Sherlock Holmes fandom have been explored in non-fiction books such as the 2015 book The Great Detective by Zach Dundas, and the 2017 book From Holmes to Sherlock by Mattias Boström.

== Societies ==
=== Overview ===
Organisations have formed all over the world devoted to Sherlock Holmes. There are many Sherlock Holmes societies, though estimates of the number of groups vary; one source published in 1999 states that there are 375 such groups, another source published in 2001 estimates the number of societies is at least 250, and a different source published in 2009 states that there are more than 400 active Sherlock Holmes societies. In many of these groups, members often play the Sherlockian game, analyzing the stories under the premise that Holmes and Watson were real historical people. Members of these societies also participate in many other activities such as discussing adaptations of the stories and organising events.

Many Sherlock Holmes groups are based in geographical areas, though these groups often have an online presence. Some groups are based online, such as the longest established online Sherlock Holmes discussion group, the Hounds of the Internet mailing list, which has existed since 1992, and the John H Watson Society, a worldwide online society established in 2013, which was founded mainly by members of existing American Sherlock Holmes societies.

=== North America ===
The oldest Sherlock Holmes society is the Baker Street Irregulars, based in New York. In 1934, Christopher Morley hosted a dinner in New York City in honour of Sherlock Holmes which led to the formation of The Baker Street Irregulars, or BSI. Unlike most Sherlock Holmes societies, membership in The Baker Street Irregulars is by invitation only. Each member receives an "investiture" or a special title. The Baker Street Irregulars was an all-male group until 1991. Another Sherlock Holmes society based in New York City, The Adventuresses of Sherlock Holmes, or ASH, was founded in the late 1960s and was first led by Evelyn Herzog. It is the oldest women’s Sherlockian society. The group protested the exclusion of women from the Baker Street Irregulars. In 1991, some Adventuresses were among the first women to be invested as members of the BSI. That year, a few men were given honorary membership in the ASH. Men were admitted to full membership of the ASH in 2008.

There are Sherlock Holmes societies located throughout the United States that are "scion societies" of the Baker Street Irregulars. Membership is open to anyone in many of these groups, for example the Norwegian Explorers of Minnesota, a scion society of the BSI which was founded in 1948. In 1957, together with the Sherlock Holmes Society of London, the Norwegian Explorers unveiled a commemorative plaque for Sherlock Holmes near the Reichenbach Falls in Switzerland.

The Bootmakers of Toronto is a Sherlock Holmes society based in Toronto, Canada. The society was established in 1972. The Bimetallic Question, a Sherlock Holmes society based in Montreal, Canada, was founded in 1979. The Bimetallic Question of Montreal, together with the Reichenbach Irregulars of Switzerland, erected a plaque for Sherlock Holmes at the Reichenbach Falls in 1992. There is also a Sherlock Holmes society in Vancouver, BC, Canada, known as the Stormy Petrels of British Columbia. It was founded in 1987.

There are many other Sherlock Holmes societies in North America, including groups considered to be scion societies of the Baker Street Irregulars as well as other groups.

=== Europe ===
An organisation named the Sherlock Holmes Society was formed in London in 1934, after the formation of The Baker Street Irregulars. It included scholars among its members such as Dorothy L. Sayers and Dick Sheppard. The group was later dissolved due to World War II. The organisation was succeeded by the Sherlock Holmes Society of London, founded in 1951 by a group of five people who organised the Sherlock Holmes exhibition at the 1951 Festival of Britain, including Freda Howlett, who was at one time the last surviving founder; she remained a member until her death nearly seventy years later in 2020 and was once president of the society. One of the other founders was W. T. Williams, and among those present at the first meeting were Guy Warrack, Gerald Kelly, and Winifred Paget, daughter of Sidney Paget. The society's first president was Sydney Castle Roberts. In 1957, the society unveiled a commemorative plaque for Sherlock Holmes near the Reichenbach Falls in Switzerland, together with an American Sherlockian society, the Norwegian Explorers of Minnesota. The London society also unveiled the world's first statue of Sherlock Holmes in Meiringen, Switzerland, near the Reichenbach Falls, in 1988. In 1999, the society's campaign for a Sherlock Holmes statue in London resulted in the unveiling of the statue of Sherlock Holmes in London. The society's events include discussions, lectures, film viewings, and Victorian cricket matches. The society also organises annual outings to areas related to Sherlock Holmes, typically to areas around the UK but also including "pilgrimages" to the Reichenbach Falls, such as the group's seventh pilgrimage to the Falls, which occurred in 2012. As of 2012, the society has nearly 1,200 full members and more than 200 associate members. Membership is open to anyone.

There are also other Sherlock Holmes societies in the UK, such as The Crew of the S.S. May Day, founded in 1992 in Belfast, Northern Ireland. Other Sherlock Holmes societies in the UK include The Deerstalkers of Welshpool, based in Welshpool, Wales and founded in 2001, and the Self-Important Scotland Yarders, the Sherlock Holmes society of Scotland, founded in 2010.

The Reichenbach Irregulars, the Sherlock Holmes society of Switzerland, was founded in Meiringen in 1989. In 1992, together with the Bimetallic Question of Montreal, the Reichenbach Irregulars erected a plaque at the Reichenbach Falls commemorating Holmes's defeat of Professor Moriarty.

The Hungarian Sherlock Holmes Club was established in 2011 and is based in Budapest, Hungary. Actor László Tahi Tóth, the Hungarian voice of Jeremy Brett for the Hungarian dubbed version of the Granada Sherlock Holmes television series, was once president of the club.

Other examples of Sherlock Holmes societies in Europe include the Danish Baker Street Irregulars, founded in 1950, The Baskerville Hall Club of Sweden, founded in 1979, the Italian society Uno Studio in Holmes, founded in 1987, the Société Sherlock Holmes de France (Sherlock Holmes Society of France), founded in 1993, and the Deutsche Sherlock-Holmes-Gesellschaft (German Sherlock Holmes Society), founded in 2010, among many others.

=== Other regions ===
The Japan Sherlock Holmes Club was founded in 1977. This has been described as the largest Sherlock Holmes society, though various sources give greatly different estimates of the number of members, with several but not all sources giving estimates of around one thousand. Roger Johnson, a recipient of an investiture in the BSI and the ASH, wrote in 2018 that of the Sherlock Holmes societies around the world, the Sherlock Holmes Society of London and the Japan Sherlock Holmes Club "probably have the largest membership, with well over a thousand members each". Members of the Japan Sherlock Holmes Club wrote a book on Sherlock Holmes which was published in 1987. The club commissioned a statue of Sherlock Holmes in Karuizawa, Japan, in 1988.

There are other Sherlock Holmes societies around the world, including The Sydney Passengers, founded in Sydney, Australia in 1985, and the Sherlock Holmes Society of India, founded in 2001, in addition to other societies.

== Fan sites and podcasts ==
As of 2009, there are several major websites devoted to Sherlock Holmes such as Sherlockian.net, The Best of Sherlock Holmes, Camden House, and others. Sherlockian.net was established in 1994 as the first online resource for information about Sherlock Holmes. The website The Best of Sherlock Holmes contains information about items related to Sherlock Holmes and Arthur Conan Doyle, and includes "best" lists such as a list of the best Sherlock Holmes stories. Camden House is an online collection of Doyle's Sherlock Holmes stories and the illustrations which were originally published with the stories in magazines. Some Sherlock Holmes societies such as the Sherlock Holmes Society of London also have websites with resources and information related to Sherlock Holmes.

The Hounds of the Internet is a Sherlockian listserv which was founded in the early 1990s and is open to anyone with an interest in Sherlock Holmes. Messages from some of the 170+ members are posted (in English only) in digest form at the end of each day. The Hounds is hosted by the University of Edinburgh. The current Listmaster is Alexander Braun.

I Hear of Sherlock Everywhere is a podcast and website devoted to Sherlock Holmes news and popular culture. Its first episode was released in 2007, and it has more than ten thousand followers on Twitter as of 2020. The podcast features interviews and reviews, and episodes are currently released twice a month. There are 196 episodes as of July 2020. People who have been interviewed on the podcast include Bert Coules, Laurie R. King, Leslie S. Klinger, and many others. The team behind I Hear of Sherlock Everywhere launched a separate podcast titled Sherlock Holmes: Trifles in 2017. Trifles is a shorter, weekly podcast presenting discussions about the original Sherlock Holmes stories, and has 187 episodes as of July 2020.

The Baker Street Babes are an all-female Sherlockian group who host a podcast that started in 2011. The podcast has 88 episodes as of July 2020, and features interviews and discussions. The group consists of 11 members, and has more than forty thousand followers on Twitter as of July 2020.

== Tourism ==
Sherlock Holmes tours in London are a "thriving business" as of 2018. Most of these tours start at Piccadilly Circus and include nearby locations that are mentioned in the stories or have been used as filming sites for screen adaptations. Thousands of fans of Sherlock Holmes visit the Sherlock Holmes Museum each year. The museum officially has the address of Holmes's residence, 221B Baker Street. There is also a pub in London named The Sherlock Holmes, which is decorated with objects and photographs of Sherlock Holmes characters. It is located in Charing Cross. A statue of Sherlock Holmes is located outside Baker Street tube station in London, and was unveiled in 1999.

Tours for fans of Sherlock Holmes are offered in Dartmoor, an area in southwest England which serves as the setting for much of Arthur Conan Doyle's novel The Hound of the Baskervilles. Another place associated with Sherlock Holmes that fans can tour is Undershaw, which was once the home of Arthur Conan Doyle and is located in southeast England. A statue of Sherlock Holmes, sculpted by Gerald Laing, was installed in 1989 in Edinburgh, Scotland, near Arthur Conan Doyle's birthplace.

Many fans have made a "pilgrimage" to Meiringen, Switzerland, and the nearby Reichenbach Falls, where Holmes has his final showdown with Professor Moriarty in Doyle's short story "The Final Problem". The Sherlock Holmes Society of London has organised group trips to the Reichenbach Falls intermittently since 1968. There is also a Sherlock Holmes museum in Meiringen, and another Sherlock Holmes museum in Lucens, Switzerland. The world's first statue of Sherlock Holmes was unveiled in Meiringen in September 1988, by the Sherlock Holmes Society of London, which also unveiled the statue in London in 1999. John Doubleday sculpted both of these statues.

The world's second statue of Sherlock Holmes was erected in October 1988 in Karuizawa, Japan, by the Japan Sherlock Holmes Club, to commemorate Ken Nobuhara, who was the first to translate all the stories into Japanese. The statue was sculpted by Yoshinori Satoh, and has become well-known since it is mentioned in many of the local guidebooks for tourists.

A sculpture depicting both Holmes and Watson was unveiled in Moscow, Russia, in 2007. It is located outside the British embassy. The figures were based on both Sidney Paget's illustrations and the portrayals of the characters by actors Vasily Livanov and Vitaly Solomin, who played Holmes and Watson respectively in The Adventures of Sherlock Holmes and Dr. Watson. Livanov helped design the monument.

In 2019, a statue of Holmes titled "Sherlock & Segar" was unveiled in Chester, Illinois, United States, as part of the Popeye & Friends Character Trail, a series of statues honouring the work of American cartoonist E. C. Segar. The face of the sculpture was based on that of Segar himself. The statue was erected as a tribute to Segar and his "compelling interest in the master detective", according to the inscription on the statue.

== Collections ==
Some fans of Sherlock Holmes are collectors. Such collectors often have wide-ranging collections of books and objects related to Sherlock Holmes, though some only collect specific items such as first editions or foreign language translations of Holmes stories. For stamp collectors, there are Holmesian stamps from the United Kingdom, Switzerland, and other countries and territories, and for coin collectors, there are Holmesian coins from Gibraltar and the Cook Islands.

Noted Sherlockian John Bennett Shaw, who received an investiture in The Baker Street Irregulars, at one time amassed the largest collection of Sherlock Holmes items in the world, including books, recordings, advertising, and other memorabilia. Shaw compiled a list of 100 books, pamphlets, and periodicals essential for Sherlockian study entitled The Basic Holmesian Library. Shaw's collection was bequeathed to the University of Minnesota upon his death in 1994. The university had already housed the largest public Sherlock Holmes collection. In 1995, Shaw’s collection was formally dedicated at the University of Minnesota. As of 2015, the University of Minnesota's Sherlock Holmes Collections constitute the world's largest archive of Sherlock Holmes materials, containing over 60,000 items. The collection includes objects related to Arthur Conan Doyle, and is generally not displayed.

One of the largest collections of Sherlock Holmes items is the Arthur Conan Doyle Collection at the Toronto Reference Library in Canada. The collection started in 1969 when the library purchased a large number of books from the estate of a private collector, and is displayed in a room styled after the study of Holmes's fictional Baker Street residence. The collection consists of more than 25,000 items, including materials related to Arthur Conan Doyle. During his lifetime, Richard Lancelyn Green gathered a large Sherlock Holmes collection, which was bequeathed to the Portsmouth City Museum in Portsmouth, England. There is also a large collection of Sherlock Holmes memorabilia displayed in the London pub The Sherlock Holmes.

== See also ==
- Sherlock Holmes pastiches
- Popular culture references to Sherlock Holmes
