= The Great Detective (disambiguation) =

The Great Detective is a Canadian television drama.

The Great Detective may also refer to:

- The Great Detective (book), a non-fiction book about Sherlock Holmes by Zach Dundas
- The Great Detective (film), a 2017 Chinese fantasy film
- "The Great Detective" (Between the Lines), a 1993 television episode
- "The Great Detective," a prequel to the Doctor Who episode "The Snowmen"
