= The New Annotated Sherlock Holmes =

Series of three annotated books edited by Leslie S. Klinger

- Slipcase containing Volumes 1 and 2
- Author: Arthur Conan Doyle
- Language: English
- Publisher: W. W. Norton
- Publication date: November 17, 2004 (Vol. 1 & 2); November 17, 2005 (Vol. 3)
- Publication place: United States
- Media type: Print (Hardcover)
- Pages: 1878 (Vol. 1 & 2); 992 (Vol. 3)
- ISBN: 978-0393059168 (Vol. 1 & 2); 978-0393058000 (Vol. 3)
- Preceded by: The Annotated Sherlock Holmes by William S. Baring-Gould

The New Annotated Sherlock Holmes is a series of three annotated books edited by Leslie S. Klinger, collecting all of Arthur Conan Doyle's short stories and novels about Sherlock Holmes. The books were originally published by W. W. Norton in oversized slipcased hardcover editions. The first two volumes containing the short stories were published on November 17, 2004, with the third volume containing the novels following a year later on November 17, 2005. Each volume was subsequently published separately on November 5, 2007, without a slipcase.

== Reception ==
The publication of the Sherlock Holmes canon was released to "enormous critical acclaim", having been called "definitive", "A must-have for any serious mystery fan", and "a landmark in Sherlockian publishing." The books, like other Sherlockian works, assume an in-universe perspective—that Holmes and Watson are real persons, with Doyle merely being a literary agent—and some of the scholarship is only pseudo-serious.

In a less positive review, Richard Posner declared his view that Sherlock Holmes and the Holmes stories were "wildly overrated" and called the annotated volumes "an eccentric venture." Almost ten years later, Posner would be one of the judges involved in the lawsuit against Conan Doyle Estate Ltd filed by Klinger himself.
