= The Bootmakers of Toronto =

Literary society devoted to Sherlock Holmes

The Bootmakers of Toronto are a literary society devoted to Sherlock Holmes and located in Toronto, Ontario, Canada.

== Formation ==
A number of fans of Sherlock Holmes participate in groups where they discuss theories and minutiae about the Sherlock Holmes stories. Some play the "Grand Game" by contending that Holmes and Dr. John Watson actually did exist and that the stories about them are largely factual accounts of their doings in Victorian and Edwardian Britain. The Bootmakers of Toronto are one such group.

Established in 1972, the society at one point boasted some 350 members according to one source or more than 200 according to another source, and at one time drew 80 to 100 members or more than 100 members to its regular meetings, but more recently has fewer members and draws about 50 members to its regular meetings. At their high point in the 1990s, the society was the largest active Sherlockian society in North America with five to seven meetings a year. The society continues to have around six meetings a year as of 2009.

As is tradition with many Sherlockian societies, The Bootmakers of Toronto take their name from a reference in one of Sir Arthur Conan Doyle's stories. The name of the group comes from a reference in The Hound of the Baskervilles. In the story, a boot belonging to Sir Henry Baskerville is retrieved from a bog and inside the boot is a label inscribed "Meyers, Toronto".

== Activities ==
The group often has guest speakers at meetings which are regularly held at the Toronto Reference Library and produces a quarterly journal entitled Canadian Holmes.
