= Sherlock Holmes of Baker Street =

1962 novel by William S. Baring-Gould

- First edition
- Author: William S. Baring-Gould
- Language: English
- Genre: Mystery novels
- Publisher: Bramhall House
- Publication date: 1962
- Publication place: United States
- Media type: Print (hardback and paperback)

Sherlock Holmes of Baker Street: A Life of the World's First Consulting Detective is a 1962 novel by William S. Baring-Gould. The book purports to be a biography of Sherlock Holmes. It is considered to be the "definitive" biography of Sherlock Holmes.

Some aspects of the book were loosely based on the life of Baring-Gould's paternal grandfather, Sabine Baring-Gould. Many of the theories put forth by Baring-Gould have become accepted knowledge about Sherlock Holmes, such as the full name "William Sherlock Scott Holmes", which is used in the film Sherlock Holmes in New York starring Roger Moore and the episode "His Last Vow" from series 3 of the BBC television series Sherlock. Other details established by Baring-Gould, such as Professor Moriarty being Holmes' childhood mathematics tutor, that Holmes was once an actor, and the continuing affair and one-night stand with Irene Adler, leading up to the birth of a son (who is implied in the book to be Nero Wolfe), have continued to be a part of the Great Game and have been used in other Sherlockian pastiches. The book also offers one of the earliest versions of Sherlock Holmes meeting Jack the Ripper.

Five years later in 1967, Baring-Gould would go on to publish The Annotated Sherlock Holmes, which would also be considered definitive, at least until Leslie S. Klinger published The New Annotated Sherlock Holmes in 2004–2005. Baring-Gould used many biographical details that he invented in Sherlock Holmes of Baker Street for his two annotated volumes.
