= From Holmes to Sherlock =

2017 book by Mattias Boström

From Holmes to Sherlock: The Story of the Men and Women Who Created an Icon
- First edition (Swedish)
- Author: Mattias Boström
- Original title: Från Holmes till Sherlock
- Translator: Michael Gallagher
- Language: English
- Genre: Non-fiction
- Published: 2013
- Publisher: Mysterious Press
- Publication place: United States
- English publication date: August 2017
- Media type: Print (hardback & paperback)
- ISBN: 978-0802126603 (first edition, hardback)

From Holmes to Sherlock: The Story of the Men and Women Who Created an Icon is a non-fiction book by Mattias Boström which explores the history of Sherlock Holmes and Sherlock fandom, originally published in 2017. It was nominated for an Edgar Award in the category of "Best Critical/Biographical" by the Mystery Writers of America. It won an Agatha Award for "Best Nonfiction" in 2018.

The book was originally published in Swedish. The English edition is translated by Michael Gallagher.

== Reception ==
Michael Dirda, writing for The Washington Post, called the book "the best account of Baker Street mania ever written. Really." Publishers Weekly called the book an "exhaustive study of the 130-year Sherlock Holmes phenomenon" and said "The informal, accessible style of Gallagher’s translation makes for an easy, if lengthy, read." Kirkus Reviews called the book "A spirited account of how Sherlock became a household name." Newsday called it "a book hard-core fans will eat up".

The book was part of Tom Nolan's year-end "What to Give: Mysteries" for The Wall Street Journal in 2018.
