= Sherlockian game =

Analysis of characters and events from the Sherlock Holmes series

The Sherlockian game (also known as the Holmesian game, the Great Game or simply the Game; also as the Higher Criticism) is the pastime of attempting to resolve anomalies and clarify implied details about Sherlock Holmes and Dr. Watson from the 56 short stories and four novels that make up the Sherlock Holmes canon by Arthur Conan Doyle. It treats Holmes and Watson as real people and uses aspects of the canonical stories combined with the history of the era of the tales' settings to construct fanciful biographies of the pair.

== Origins and early scholars ==
The game of examining the stories as if they were non-fiction began in the early twentieth century. There are early examples of Sherlockian essays by Arthur Bartlett Maurice and Frank Sidgwick, both published in 1902, but neither of these essays received much notice at first. Notable early scholars of the canon included Ronald Knox in Britain and Christopher Morley (founder of The Baker Street Irregulars) in New York. Dorothy L. Sayers, creator of the detective Lord Peter Wimsey, also wrote several essays on Holmesian speculation, later published in Unpopular Opinions. In the foreword to this book, Sayers notes that

The game of applying the methods of the "Higher Criticism" to the Sherlock Holmes canon was begun, many years ago, by Ronald Knox, with the aim of showing that, by those methods, one could disintegrate a modern classic as speciously as a certain school of critics have endeavoured to disintegrate the Bible. Since then, the thing has become a hobby among a select set of jesters here and in America.

Sayers also said that the Game "must be played as solemnly as a county cricket match at Lord's; the slightest touch of extravagance or burlesque ruins the atmosphere."

When a student at Oxford, Knox issued "Studies in the Literature of Sherlock Holmes", an essay which is regarded as the founding text of "Holmesian scholarship". That essay was re-printed, among others, in 1928 and the following year, Sydney Roberts, then a professor at Cambridge University, issued a reply to Knox's arguments, in a booklet entitled A Note on the Watson Problem. S.C. Roberts issued then a complete Watson biography. A book by T.S. Blakeney followed and the "Holmesian" game (commonly referred to simply as "the game") was born. Early Holmesians of note include the bibliographer and book collector Vincent Starrett (The Private Life of Sherlock Holmes) and the archaeologist Harold Wilmerding Bell.

One aspect of the Game in its traditional form is the effort to resolve or explain away contradictions in the Holmes canon, such as the location of Watson's war wound, which is described as being in his shoulder in A Study in Scarlet and in his leg in The Sign of Four, or his first name, given as John in A Study in Scarlet and "The Problem of Thor Bridge" but James in "The Man with the Twisted Lip".

While Dorothy Sayers and many of the early "Holmesians" used the works of Conan Doyle as the chief basis for their speculations, a more fanciful school of playing the historical-Holmes game is represented by William S. Baring-Gould, author of Sherlock Holmes of Baker Street (1962), a personal "biography" of Holmes.

A more recent "biography" is Nick Rennison's Sherlock Holmes: The Unauthorized Biography (Atlantic Books, 2005). Since 1998, Leslie S. Klinger has edited The Sherlock Holmes Reference Library (Gasogene Books, Indianapolis), which sums up the available Holmesian "scholarship" alongside the original "canonical" texts.

Mark Frost's 1993 novel The List of Seven presents a fictionalized account of Sherlock Holmes' literary origins. In the story, Arthur Conan Doyle, an aspiring but struggling author, is caught up in an assassination attempt and is saved by a man exhibiting many of the prototypical characteristics of Holmes. Frost wrote a follow-up novel called The Six Messiahs.

== The Holmes family ==
A particularly rich area of "research" is the "uncovering" of details about Holmes' family history and early life, of which almost nothing is said in Conan Doyle's stories. In "The Adventure of the Greek Interpreter", Watson states: "I had never heard him refer to his relations, and hardly ever to his early life." But in that story, as well as introducing his brother, Holmes mentions the only facts about his family that are in any of the stories — "My ancestors were country squires... [M]y grandmother... was the sister of Vernet, the French artist" (presumably Horace Vernet). Beyond this, all familial statements are speculation. For example, there is a certain belief that his mother was named Violet, based on Conan Doyle's fondness for the name and the four strong Violets in the canon; however, as Baring-Gould noted, in Holmes' Britain, Violet was a very common name.

It is clear from references to "the university" in "The Adventure of the Gloria Scott", "The Adventure of the Musgrave Ritual", and to some degree "The Adventure of the Three Students", that Holmes attended Oxford or Cambridge, although the question of which one remains a topic of eternal debate. Baring-Gould believed textual evidence indicated that Holmes attended both.

The most influential "biography" of Holmes is Sherlock Holmes of Baker Street by Baring-Gould. Faced with Holmes' reticence about his family background and early life, Baring-Gould invented one for him. According to Baring-Gould, Sherlock Holmes was born in Yorkshire, the youngest of three sons of Siger Holmes and Violet Sherrinford. The middle brother, Mycroft, appears in the canon, but the eldest, Sherrinford Holmes, was invented by Baring-Gould to free Mycroft and Sherlock from the obligation of following Siger as a country squire. In reality, "Sherrinford Holmes" was one of the names Arthur Conan Doyle considered for his hero before settling on "Sherlock". Siger Holmes' name is derived from "The Adventure of the Empty House", in which Sherlock tells Watson that he spent some time pretending to be a Norwegian called Sigerson, which Baring-Gould reads literally as meaning "son of Siger."

Sherrinford had a significant role in the Doctor Who crossover novel All-Consuming Fire by Andy Lane, which also featured a cameo by Siger.

Some other notable versions of Holmes' parentage:

- Nicholas Meyer's The Seven-Per-Cent Solution reveals that Holmes's mother was cheating on his father, who then killed both her and himself. The film adaptation, also written by Meyer, further reveals that Moriarty was Holmes's mother's lover; in the novel, Moriarty is the man who brought young Sherlock the news of his parents' death. Either circumstance explains not only Holmes's career choice, but also (in an appropriately Freudian manner) his hatred of Professor Moriarty.
- Michael Harrison's I, Sherlock Holmes names his father as Captain Siger Holmes of the British East India Company.
- Fred Saberhagen's The Holmes-Dracula File suggests that Sherlock has some genetic parentage from the vampire Radu the Handsome, a younger brother of Vlad III Dracula, who had succeeded him as a ruler of Wallachia. Radu is not precisely Sherlock's father, however, as vampires (in Saberhagen's Dracula series) are incapable of conceiving children. Rather, Sherlock's unfaithful mother was having marital relations with his father at the same time as she was carrying on an affair with the vampire. Her affair included drinking Radu's blood—which would include his genetic material. So Sherlock (and, in Saberhagen's novel, his unnamed identical twin vampire brother) is a human chimera, with genetic material from three people. This would make Sherlock a nephew to Dracula.
- Nancy Springer introduced Enola Holmes (the younger sister of Mycroft and Sherlock) in her Enola Holmes Mysteries, a series of detective stories for young readers. Enola was born "shamefully late in life", to her parents Eudoria Vernet Holmes, a suffragist and talented watercolourist, and an unnamed father, who was a country squire.

=== The Holmes family and the Wold Newton family ===
Based originally on the writings of Philip José Farmer, the concept of the Wold Newton family is the construction of a giant genealogical tree which connects many fictional characters to each other and to a number of historical figures. Additions to this tree are based on the writings of the original creators, pastiche writers, and "Wold Newton scholars". Sherlock Holmes has been one of the central characters of this tree. The Holmes family and its various generations have been the subject of many Wold Newton articles.

The Wold Newton family is mentioned in James Lovegrove's Sherlock Holmes and the Christmas Demon.

== See also ==
- Sherlock Holmes fandom
