= Sherlock Holmes: The Unauthorized Biography =

2005 novel by Nick Rennison

- Author: Nick Rennison
- Language: English
- Genre: Mystery novels
- Publisher: Atlantic Monthly Press
- Publication date: November 10, 2005
- Publication place: United States
- Media type: Print (Hardback & Paperback)
- ISBN: 0-87113-947-2 (first edition, hardback)

Sherlock Holmes: The Unauthorized Biography is a Sherlock Holmes pastiche novel by Nick Rennison, originally published in 2005.

In the novel, Rennison postulates that Sherlock Holmes was involved in various historical events, including the Jack the Ripper case, the Crippen murder case, and World War I.

So, really, the book is three strands woven together. There's the material from the Conan Doyle stories, there's the real history of the 19th century, and if those two failed to provide something then I was in a position where I could simply make it up.

— Nick Rennison, Interview with ICONS England

Rennison has stated that the novel was initially the idea of his editor, Angus MacKinnon.

== Reception ==
The Telegraph positively reviewed the book saying "One need not be a Sherlock Holmes obsessive to appreciate this peculiar enterprise. Described as erudite though pointless by one critic, Rennison's book is a marvel of ingenuity." Publishers Weekly said "He falls a little short in explaining Holmes's devotion of time and resources to espionage rather than deduction, but overall his attempt ranks with previous similar speculations by Michael Harrison and William S. Baring-Gould." The Los Angeles Times said "Rennison does a marvelous job of overlaying his own extensive research on clues from Doyle's tales of Watson and Holmes, deciphering much for this complex, engaging portrait."

Some reviews were more critical with The New York Times saying "Sherlock Holmes: The Unauthorized Biography is a chance for Rennison to show off his knowledge of Holmes minutiae and his research on the late Victorian and Edwardian eras. But it's a good deal less entertaining than the best of those pastiches, like Nicholas Meyer's Seven-Per-Cent Solution." The Spectator was also critical saying the book "moves fully into the area of wild supposition, and falls flat...Flaccid writing such as 'Holmes's love of the theatre was stimulated by the toy theatre bought for him by his grandmother when he was still a small boy' only makes things worse. This might have been a witty enough short essay, but between hard covers it comes across as a dinner-party game which got out of hand."
