= List of authors of new Sherlock Holmes stories =

The following is an alphabetical list and selected bibliography of authors, other than Sherlock Holmes's creator Sir Arthur Conan Doyle, who have written Holmes stories:

== A ==
- Kareem Abdul-Jabbar and Anna Waterhouse: Mycroft Holmes (2015), Mycroft and Sherlock (2018), Mycroft and Sherlock: The Empty Birdcage (2019)
- Guy Adams: Sherlock Holmes: The Breath of God (2011), and Sherlock Holmes: The Army of Dr Moreau (2012)
- Boris Akunin: Jade Rosary Beads (2006 crossover with Erast Fandorin)
- Poul Anderson: Time Patrol (1955), where the main character meets Sherlock Holmes and Dr. Watson during time travels.
- Val Andrews: Famous music-hall artist, he authored about a dozen new Holmes stories (1988-2006), most of them with a magic/music-hall background.

== B ==
- John Kendrick Bangs: R. Holmes & Co.: Being the Remarkable Adventures of Raffles Holmes, Esq., Detective and Amateur Cracksman by Birth (1906), illus. Sydney Adamnson; New York and London: Harper & Brothers
- David Barnett: "Woman's Work", a short story in Encounters of Sherlock Holmes (2013)
- Stephen Baxter: "The Adventure of the Intertial Adjustor" (Holmes and Watson meet H.G. Wells) in The Mammoth Book of New Sherlock Holmes Adventures (1997)
- Pierre Bayard: Sherlock Holmes was wrong: reopening the case of the Hound of the Baskervilles (2007)
- Peter S. Beagle: "Mr. Sigerson" in Sherlock Holmes: The Hidden Years (2004)
- Sam Benady: Sherlock Holmes in Gibraltar - the true Solution to the Mystery of Mary Celeste and the singular affair of the Duke of Connaught (1990), contains three short stories
- Lloyd Biggle: The Quallsford Inheritance: A Memoir of Sherlock Holmes from the Papers of Edward Porter Jones, His Late Assistant (1986)
- Leigh Blackmore : "Exalted Are the Forces of Darkness" in Gaslight Grotesque: Nightmare Tales of Sherlock Holmes, 2009: "The Arcana of Death". Strange Detective Stories 4 (2014); "The Adventure of the Metaphysics of Madness". Mantichore 10 (Apr 2015).
- Anthony Boucher: The Case of the Baker Street Irregulars NY Simon & Schuster (1940)
- Rhys Bowen: "The Case of the Lugubrious Manservant" in Sherlock Holmes: The Hidden Years (2004)
- Rick Boyer: The Giant Rat of Sumatra (1976)
- Eric Brown: "The Tragic Affair of the Martian Ambassador", a short story in Encounters of Sherlock Holmes (2013)
- Anthony Burgess: "Murder to Music", a short story in The Devil's Mode (1989)

== C ==
- Caleb Carr: The Italian Secretary (2005).
- John Dickson Carr: The Exploits of Sherlock Holmes (1954) collaboration with Adrian Conan Doyle
- Michael Chabon: The Final Solution (2004) features an unnamed elderly Sherlock Holmes
- Arthur Chapman: "The Unmasking of Sherlock Holmes" in The Game is Afoot: Parodies, Pastiches and Ponderings of Sherlock Holmes (1994), Marvin Kaye editor
- Michael Collins: "Cross of Gold" in Sherlock Holmes: The Hidden Years (2004)
- Paul Cornell: "The Deer Stalker" (2014)
- Bert Coules: the scripts/story boards for the BBC show The Further Adventures of Sherlock Holmes (2002)
- Jon Courtenay Grimwood: "The Spy's Retirement" (2004)
- Arthur Byron Cover: An East Wind Coming (1979?)
- Mitch Cullin: A Slight Trick of the Mind (2005)

== D ==
- David Stuart Davies: He is the author of seven Holmes novels: Sherlock Holmes and the Hentzau Affair (1991), The Tangled Skein (1995), The Scroll of the Dead (1998), Shadow of the Rat (1999), The Veiled Detective (2004), The Devil's Promise (2014) and The Ripper Legacy (2016). His Holmes short stories include "The Darlington Substitution Scandal" (in The Mammoth Book of New Sherlock Holmes Adventures, 1997), "The Adventure of the Whitrow Inheritance", "Sherlock Holmes and the Ghost of Christmas Past" and "Sherlock Holmes and the Reichenbach Secret" (all in The Game's Afoot, 2008).
- Jeffery Deaver: "The Westphalian Ring" in the 2006 short story collection More Twisted.
- Colin Dexter: "A Case of Mis-Identity", in his short story collection Morse's Greatest Mystery (1993).
- Michael Dibdin: The Last Sherlock Holmes Story (1978)
- Richard Dinnick: "The Adventure of the Swaddled Railwayman"', a short story in Encounters of Sherlock Holmes (2013)
- Stuart Douglas: The Albino's Treasure (2015), featuring Monsieur Zenith the Albino, and The Counterfeit Detective (2016).
- Adrian Conan Doyle (Doyle's son, and former holder of his estate)- collaborations with John Dickson Carr (c.f.) The Exploits of Sherlock Holmes (1954)
- Jean Dutourd: Les Mémoires de Mary Watson (1980)- the meeting of Dr Watson with his future wife, Mary Morstan, during Holmes' investigation of the death of Morstan's father

== E, F ==
- Loren D. Estleman: Sherlock Holmes vs. Dracula; or, The Adventure of the Sanguinary Count (1978) and Dr. Jekyll and Mr. Holmes (1979)
- Philip José Farmer: The Adventure of the Peerless Peer (1974), in which Holmes teams up with Tarzan. This was later extensively rewritten as The Adventure of the Three Madmen due to copyright troubles.
- Lyndsay Faye: Dust and Shadow: An Account of the Ripper Killings by Dr. John H. Watson (2009) and The Whole Art of Detection: Lost Mysteries of Sherlock Holmes (2017).
- Jorge Fernandez Diaz: "El Dilema de los Proceres" (2009). Features Sherlock Holmes solving a mystery during the early 20th century in Argentina.
- Christopher Fowler: "The Lady Downstairs" (2007)
- George MacDonald Fraser: Flashman and the Tiger (1999)

== G ==
- Neil Gaiman: "A Study in Emerald" in the multi-author collection Shadows Over Baker Street. Won the 2004 Hugo for Best Short Story. Also "The Case of Death and Honey" in the collection A Study in Sherlock.
- Arnould Galopin: "Herlockoms" (another avatar of Sherlock Holmes in French literature) crossover with Allan Dickson, the Australian detective, in "La ténébreuse affaire de Green Park" (1910) and "L'homme au complet gris" (1931) - another Sherlock Holmes versus Jack the Ripper story
- Juan García Rodenas: Two short stories in Spanish, "La guerra del Doctor Watson" (Doctor Watson's War), about Watson's campaign in Afghanistan, and "La Aventura del Magnicidio Resuelto" (The Adventure of the Solved Assassination), about young Holmes and the assassination of Abraham Lincoln; both in Antes de Baker Street, Academia de Mitología Creativa Jules Verne de Albacete, 2008.
- David Gerrold: short story "The Fan Who Molded Himself"
- Theodora Goss: The Strange Case of the Alchemist's Daughter (2017 novel)
- Denis Green (& Anthony Boucher): scripts and short stories for the American broadcast show The New Adventures of Sherlock Holmes (1939–1946)
- Dominic Green: "Sherlock Holmes and the Adventure of the Lost World" (2004)
- Robert Greenberger (and Steven Savile): Murder At Sorrow's Crown (2016).

== H ==
- Edward D. Hanna: The Whitechapel Horrors (1993).
- Michael Hardwick: The Prisoner of the Devil (1979), Sherlock Holmes: My Life and Crimes (1984), The Revenge of the Hound (1987)
- Robert J. Harris: A Study in Crimson (2022), The Devil's Blaze (2022)
- Michael Harrison: I, Sherlock Holmes - Memoirs of Mr Sherlock Holmes, OM, late Consulting Private Detective-in-Ordinary to Their Majesties Queen Victoria, King Edward VII and King Georges V (1977)
- Edward D. Hoch: "The Adventure of Vittoria the Circus Belle" in The Mammoth Book of New Sherlock Holmes Adventures (1997)
- Mark Hodder: "The Loss of Chapter Twenty-One", a short story in Encounters of Sherlock Holmes (2013)
- Anthony Horowitz: The House of Silk, Little Brown and Company (2011)

== I, J, K ==
- Enrique Jardiel Poncela: Novísimas aventuras de Sherlock Holmes (Spanish Very new adventures of Sherlock Holmes), seven short parodic stories originally published in magazines in 1928 and several times published in book form.
- Kenneth Johnson: Holmes Coming (2022)
- Stephen King: "The Doctor's Case" (1987), in which Watson solves a case before Holmes.
- John R. King: The Shadow of Reichenbach Falls (2008)
- Laurie R. King: The Mary Russell series of novels set in Holmes' later life (ongoing as of February 2024).
- Ronald A. Knox: "The Adventure of the First-Class Carriage" in The Further Adventures of Sherlock Holmes, 1985.
- Kaoru Shintani: Young Miss Holmes (2006)
- Michael Kurland: The Infernal Device (1978), Death by Gaslight (1982), The Great Game (2001), The Empress of India (2006), Who Thinks Evil (2014); and the short stories "The Paradol Paradox" (2001), "Years Ago and in a Different Place" in My Sherlock Holmes, (2003), "Reichenbach" in Sherlock Holmes: The Hidden Years (2004) and "The Picture of Oscar Wilde" (2013). In this series, Professor Moriarty is the real hero who helps the bewildered Holmes solve crimes by providing him clues to discover the real villains.

== L ==
- Lai Ho: The Great Detective Sherlock Holmes series
- Mercedes Lackey: A Study in Sable (2016), A Scandal in Battersea (2017), The Bartered Brides (2018), The Case of the Spellbound Child (2019)
- Geoffrey A. Landis: "The Singular Habits of Wasps" (1994), nominated for the Hugo and Nebula awards.
- Andy Lane: The Young Sherlock Holmes series; Death Cloud and Red Leech. Also, All-Consuming Fire (1994), where the Doctor from Doctor Who and Sherlock Holmes team up to battle the forces of H. P. Lovecraft's Cthulhu Mythos.
- Maurice Leblanc: crossover with Arsène Lupin in: Arsène Lupin contre Herlock Sholmes (1910)
- Alexis Lecaye: French novelist and TV scriptwriter "Marx et Sherlock Holmes", "Einstein et Sherlock Holmes" (1989)
- Jean-Marc Lofficier & wife Randy Lofficier: short story in Les nombreuses vies de Sherlock Holmes (2005)
- James Lovegrove: "The Fallen Financier", a short story in Encounters of Sherlock Holmes (2013), Sherlock Holmes: The Stuff of Nightmares (2013), Sherlock Holmes: Gods of War (2014), Sherlock Holmes: The Thinking Engine (2015), and Sherlock Holmes and the Shadwell Shadows (2016), Sherlock Holmes and the Miskatonic Monstrosities (2017), Sherlock Holmes and the Sussex Sea-Devils (2018), Sherlock Holmes: The Devil's Dust (2018), features both Holmes and Allan Quatermain, Sherlock Holmes and the Christmas Demon (2019), Sherlock Holmes and the Beast of the Stapletons (2020), Sherlock Holmes and The Three Winter Terrors (2021)
- James Lowder: "The Weeping Masks" in Shadows Over Baker Street anthology (2003)

== M ==
- Jonathan Maberry: "The Adventure of the Greenbrier Ghost" in Legends of the Mountain State Volume 2 (2008). Holmes and Watson deal with a West Virginia murder and the ghost that follows.
- Bonnie MacBird: Art in the Blood (2015) and Unquiet Spirits (2017)
- F. Gwynplaine MacIntyre: "The Enigma of the Warwickshire Vortex" (1997) and "The Adventure of Exham Priory " in the "H.P. Lovecraft-sounding" Shadows Over Baker Street anthology (2003)
- Eddie Maguire: a short story in Sherlock Holmes and the Three Poisoned Pawns (2008) : Holmes meeting the Kaizer during a WE in Dorset
- Paul Magrs: "Mrs Hudson at the Christmas Hotel", a short story in Encounters of Sherlock Holmes (2013)
- Michael Mallory: Short stories in the anthologies My Sherlock Holmes (2003), Sherlock Holmes: the Hidden Years (2004) and Sherlock Holmes: the American Years (2010), in addition to a series of short stories and novels featuring "Amelia Watson," the second wife of Dr. John H. Watson.
- George Mann: Sherlock Holmes: The Will of the Dead (2013) and Sherlock Holmes: The Spirit Box (2014). Also "The Case of the Night Crawler", a short story in Encounters of Sherlock Holmes (2013)
- Rafael Marín: Elemental, querido Chaplin (2005, ISBN 84-450-7542-X) is presented as an unpublished manuscript in which Charles Chaplin tells how, as a London poor child, he helped Sherlock Holmes in an adventure against Fu Manchu.
- Rodolfo Martínez: four novels in Spanish language incl. Sherlock Holmes y la Boca del Infierno and Sherlock Holmes y la Subiduría de los Muertos (2008)
- Keisuke Matsuoka: Sherlock Holmes: A Scandal in Japan (2017). Translated into the English language by James Balzer. Originally published in the Japanese language as Shaarokku Homuzu tai Ito Hirobumi (2017).
- Vonda N. McIntyre: "The Adventure of the Field Theorems" in Sherlock Holmes in Orbit (1995)
- Nicholas Meyer: Five novels The Seven-Per-Cent Solution (1974), The West End Horror (1976), The Canary Trainer (1993), The Adventure of the Peculiar Protocols (2019), The Return of the Pharaoh (2021)
- Larry Millett: Sherlock Holmes and the Red Demon (1996), Sherlock Holmes and the Ice Palace (1998), Sherlock Holmes and the Rune Stone Mystery (1999), Sherlock Holmes and the Secret Alliance (2002), The Disappearance of Sherlock Holmes (2003)
- Spike Milligan: The Hound of the Baskervilles According to Spike Milligan (1998)
- Michael Moorcock: a short story "The Affair of the Texan's Honour" in The Further Adventures of Sherlock Holmes

== N, O, P, Q ==
- Kim Newman: A Shambles in Belgravia, Moriarty: The Hound of the D'Urbervilles (2011)
- Jamyang Norbu: The Mandala of Sherlock Holmes (1999)
- Philip Pullman: Sherlock Holmes and the Limehouse Horror (1992)
- Michel Pagel: a short story in Les nombreuses Vies de Sherlock Holmes (2005)
- Stuart Palmer: "The Adventure of the Marked Man" in The Further Adventures of Sherlock Holmes, (1985)
- Anne Perry: short stories "The Watch Night Bell" in Holmes for the Holidays (1999) and "The Christmas Gift" in More Holmes for the Holidays
- Van Allen Plexico: 2 short stories: "The Problem at Stamford Bridge" and "The Adventure of the Tuvan Delegate" in Sherlock Holmes, Consulting Detective Volume One (Cornerstone Book Publishers, June 2009)
- Alex Prior: "The Lost Case Files of Sherlock Holmes" (2020)

== R ==
- Anthony Read: the Sherlock Holmes's (sic) Baker Street Boys series (1983)
- Kel Richards: The Curse of the Pharaohs (1997)
- Barrie Roberts: Sherlock Holmes and the Railway Maniac (1994), Sherlock Holmes and the Devil's Grail (1995), Sherlock Holmes and the Man From Hell (1997), Sherlock Holmes and the Royal Flush (1998. Sherlock Holmes and the Harvest Of Death (1999), Sherlock Holmes and the Crosby Murder (2001), Sherlock Holmes and the Rule of Nine (2003), Sherlock Holmes and the King's Governess (2005), Sherlock Holmes and the American Angels (2007)
- Sydney Castle Roberts: "The Adventure of the Megatherium Thefts" in The Further Adventures of Sherlock Holmes, (1985).
- Samuel Rosenberg: Naked is the Best Disguise: The Death and Resurrection of Sherlock Holmes, (1974). Fiction or non-fiction? That's the question...
- André-François Ruaud: with Xavier Mauméjean Les nombreuses vies de Sherlock Holmes a " biography " of Sherlock Holmes with short stories by Michael Moorcock, Michel Page, Patrick Marcel, Jean & Randy Lofficier and Béatrice Nicodème

== S ==
- Fred Saberhagen: The Holmes-Dracula File (1978) and Seance for a Vampire (1994)
- Dorothy L. Sayers
- Bernard J. Schaffer: Whitechapel: the Final Stand of Sherlock Holmes (16 June 2011)
- Cavan Scott: "The Demon Slasher of Seven Sisters", a short story in Encounters of Sherlock Holmes (2013)
- Christopher Sequeira: "His Last Arrow" in Gaslight Grimoire; "The Adventure of the Haunted Showman" and "The Return of the Sussex Vampire" in The Game's Afoot! (2007) (ed: David Stuart Davies).
- Aaron Smith: short story "The Massachusetts Affair" in Sherlock Holmes, Consulting Detective Volume One (Cornerstone Book Publishers, 2009)
- Dean Wesley Smith: "Two Roads, No Choices" in Sherlock Holmes in Orbit (1995)
- Jô Soares: O Xangô de Baker Street (2001) (US title: A Samba for Sherlock) - Sherlock Holmes meets Jack the Ripper in Brazil, before the murders in Whitechapel.
- Donald Stanley: Holmes Meets 007 (1964; reprinted in 1967). Sherlock Holmes meets James Bond.
- Vincent Starrett: novels and short stories "The Adventure of the Unique Hamlet" in The Further Adventures of Sherlock Holmes (1985) and the revised and expanded edition of The Private Life of Sherlock Holmes (1933, revised and expanded edition 1960)
- Meg Stretch: Baileys & Co. series (2024)
- Julian Symons: "The Adventure of Hillerman Hall" in The Further Adventures of Sherlock Holmes, (1985)

== T, U, V ==
- Ludwig Thoma: "Der Münzdiebstahl oder Sherlock Holmes in München", (1906)
- Frankie Thomas Sherlock Holmes and the Golden Bird (1973), Sherlock Holmes and the Sacred Sword (1980)
- Donald Thomas: The Secret Cases of Sherlock Holmes (1997),Sherlock Holmes and the Running Noose (2001), Sherlock Holmes and the Voice from the Crypt (2002), The Execution of Sherlock Holmes (2007), Sherlock Holmes and the King's Evil (2009), Sherlock Holmes and the Ghosts of Bly (2010), Death on a Pale Horse: Sherlock Holmes on Her Majesty's Secret Service (2013)
- June Thomson (aka June Valerie Thomson): The Secret Files of Sherlock Holmes (1990), The Secret Chronicles of Sherlock Holmes (1992), The Secret Journals of Sherlock Holmes (1993), Holmes and Watson: A Study in Friendship (1995), The Secret Documents of Sherlock Holmes (1999), The Secret Notebooks of Sherlock Holmes (2004), The Secret Archives of Sherlock Holmes (2012) and Sherlock Holmes and the Lady in Black (2015)
- Peter Tremayne: "The Affray at the Kildare Street Club" in The Mammoth Book of New Sherlock Holmes Adventures, (1997)
- Harry Turtledove, The Scarlet Band, an Alternative History story in which the very thinly disguised English detective Athelstan Helms and his associate and biographer Doctor James Walton visit a never-sunk Atlantis.
- Mark Twain: "A Double-Barrelled Detective Story" (1902), a story featuring Sherlock Holmes and making a farce on Holmes's style and deduction.
- Cay Van Ash: Ten Years Beyond Baker Street: Sherlock Holmes Matches Wits with the Diabolical Dr. Fu Manchu (1985); Holmes versus Fu Manchu
- Alan Vanneman: Sherlock Holmes and the Giant Rat of Sumatra (2002) and Sherlock Holmes and the Hapsburg Tiara (2003)
- Yves Varende: Le Requin de la Tamise, Le Tueur dans le Fog, Le Secret de l'Ile aux Chiens, Les Meurtres du Titanic, L'Otage de Fraulein Doktor; anthologies : Sherlock Holmes revient, Sherlock Holmes et les Fantômes

== W, X, Y & Z ==
- Michael Walsh (as Micheal Breathnach, with Clare Breathnach): "The Coole Park Problem" in Ghosts in Baker Street, (2006)
- Manly Wade Wellman: Sherlock Holmes's War of the Worlds (1975), a steampunk sci-fi novel where Holmes meets Prof. Challenger and battles the Martian invaders.
- Ron Weyman: Sherlock Holmes and the Mark of the Beast (1989), Sherlock Holmes and the Ultimate Disguise (1991), Sherlock Holmes Travels in the Canadian West (1991)
- Wayne Worcester: The Monster at St Marylebone and The Jewel of Covent Garden (2000)
- Sean M. Wright & Michael P. Hodel: Enter the Lion : A Posthumous Memoir of Mycroft Holmes (1979) and The Sherlock Holmes Cookbook series with John Farrell; also consultant for the TV Show The Return of Sherlock Holmes
- Futaro Yamada: "The Yellow Lodger" (1953) in The Tower of London: Tales of Victorian London, 2005, translated from the Japanese by Damian Flanagan

== Anthologies ==
- Adams, John J. (ed.) The Improbable Adventures of Sherlock Holmes. San Francisco: Night Shade, 2009.
- Ashley, Michael (ed.) The Mammoth Book of New Sherlock Holmes Adventures. New York: Carroll & Graf, 1997.
- Asimov, Isaac, Martin H. Greenberg, and Charles G Waugh (eds.) Sherlock Holmes Through Time and Space. New York: St. Martin's Press, 1986.
- Hall, Kenton (ed.) Sherlock Holmes - The Woman Who Wasn't. Chinbeard Books, 2023.
- Kaye, Marvin (ed.) The Confidential Casebook of Sherlock Holmes. New York: St. Martin's Press, 1998.
- Kaye, Marvin, and David Stuart Davies (eds.) The Game is Afoot: Parodies, Pastiches and Ponderings of Sherlock Holmes. New York: St. Martin's Press, 1995
- Penzler, Otto (ed.) The Big Book of Sherlock Holmes Stories. New York: Pantheon, 2015.
- Prepolec, Charles, and J. R. Campbell (eds.) Gaslight Grimoire: Fantastic Tales of Sherlock Holmes. Calgary: EDGE Science Fiction and Fantasy Pub., 2008.
- Prepolec, Charles, and J. R. Campbell (eds.) Gaslight Grotesque: Nightmare Tales of Sherlock Holmes. Calgary: EDGE Science Fiction and Fantasy Pub., 2009.
- Prepolec, Charles, and J. R. Campbell (eds.) Gaslight Arcanum: Uncanny Tales of Sherlock Holmes. Calgary: EDGE Science Fiction and Fantasy Pub., 2011.
- Queen, Ellery (ed.) The Misadventures of Sherlock Holmes. Little, Brown and Company, 1944.
- Reaves, Michael, and John Pelan (eds.) Shadows Over Baker Street. New York: Ballantine, 2003. A cross-over collection of Holmes stories set in the Cthulhu Mythos universe.
- Resnick, Michael D., and Martin H. Greenberg (eds.) Sherlock Holmes in Orbit. New York: DAW Books, 1995.
- Smith, Denis O. (ed.) The Mammoth Book of the Lost Chronicles of Sherlock Holmes: 12 New Adventures and Intrigues. London: Running Press, 2014.
