= The Quick and the Dead =

The Quick and the Dead may refer to:

- The quick and the dead (idiom), a phrase originating in the Bible and popularized by the Apostles' Creed

== Films ==
- The Quick and the Dead (1963 film), a war film directed by Robert Totten, set in Nazi-occupied Europe during World War II
- The Quick and the Dead (1978 film), a documentary about Grand Prix racing, narrated by Stacy Keach
- The Quick and the Dead (1987 film), a television movie directed by Robert Day, based on Louis L'Amour's 1973 novel
- The Quick and the Dead (1995 film), a western directed by Sam Raimi, starring Sharon Stone as a gunfighter

== Literature ==
- The Quick and the Dead (collection), a 1965 collection of stories by Vincent Starrett
- The Quick and the Dead (1931), a novel by Gamaliel Bradford
- The Quick and the Dead (1933), a novel by Gerald Bullett
- The Quick and the Dead (1943), a novel by Ellery Queen
- The Quick and the Dead (1956), a book by Bill Waterton
- The Quick and the Dead (1969), a novel by Thomas Wiseman
- The Quick and the Dead (1973), a novel by Louis L'Amour
- The Quick and the Dead (1984), a novel by Robert Vaughan
- The Quick and the Dead (1991), a book by George Grant
- The Quick and the Dead (1996), a novel by Alison Joseph
- The Quick and the Dead (2002), a novel by Joy Williams

== Television ==
- "Fun on the Freeway or The Quick and the Dead", Rocky and Bullwinkle season 2, episode 89; chapter 3 of The Last Angry Moose (1961)
- "Quick and the Dead", V.I.P. season 2, episode 5 (1999)
- "The Quick and the Dead", Alphas season 2, episode 2 (2012)
- "The Quick and the Dead", It's Like, You Know... season 2, episode 15 (2000)
- "The Quick and the Dead", Judging Amy season 5, episode 19 (2004)
- "The Quick and the Dead", Maverick season 1, episode 12 (1957)
- "The Quick and the Dead", Paul Temple series 4, episode 6 (1971)
- "The Quick and the Dead", Route 66 season 1, episode 13 (1961)
- "The Quick and the Dead", The Adventures of Don Quick episode 5 (1970)
- "The Quick and the Dead", The Bill series 4, episode 27 (1988)
- "The Quick and the Dead", The Human Jungle series 2, episode 7 (1965)

== See also ==
- The Three Dead and the Three Quick, a theme in medieval visual arts
- The Quick and the Undead, a 2006 Western zombie horror film
