= Don't Just Sit There! =

Television show

Don't Just Sit There! is a television show that first aired in 1988 and lasted for three seasons on Nickelodeon. It was a variety talk show comedy show. Segments included making food or taking things apart such as a Nintendo, interviews with celebrity guests, or straight comedy sketches. The basic concept of the show was to give kids ideas for different things they could do rather than just sitting and watching TV, hence the title. Out of Order was the house band on the series; the band’s members would later get to sing on the show as well as participate in sketches.

The show's guests included Davy Jones, Mayim Bialik, Lou Diamond Phillips, Tami Erin, Downtown Julie Brown, Michael Palin, William Shatner, Jerry O'Connell, Yahoo Serious, "Weird Al" Yankovic, Michael Richards, Marc Summers, New Kids on the Block, and Robert Englund wearing his Freddy Krueger make-up and costume. One of the first musical guests on the show was the ska band Fishbone.

== Cast ==
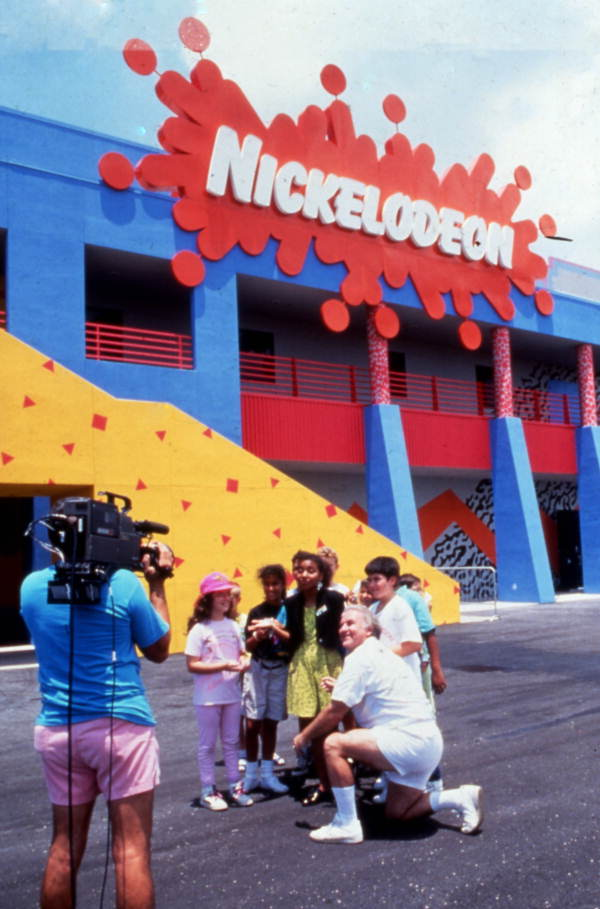
Wendy Douglas filming a segment for Nickelodeon Studios Opening Day Celebration!, 1990

- Matt Brown as Host
- Wendy Douglas as Host
- Will Friedle as host
- B. J. Schaffer as Host
- Alie Smith as Host
- Mike Baldwin as Band Member (drummer)
- Chris Guice as Band Member (bass guitarist)
- Ed Jahn as Band Member (keyboards)
- Buxton Pryor as Band Member (guitarist)
