= Sweet Women Lie =

1990 crime novel by Loren D. Estleman

- First edition cover
- Author: Loren D. Estleman
- Publisher: Houghton Mifflin
- Publication date: April 1, 1990

Sweet Women Lie is a crime novel by American author Loren D. Estleman. The book is set in Detroit, Michigan and was first published in 1990. The book is the eleventh of a series and the main character is Amos Walker, a private detective. The series has established itself in the genre and runs to more than thirty titles.

== Plot summary ==
Amos Walker's ex-wife has a new boyfriend, whom she cannot find. She employs Walker in the search, but the new "beau" has a secret life as a government assassin. The events of the book unfold from that discovery.
