= Sherlock Holmes: The Army of Dr. Moreau =

2012 novel by Guy Adams

- First edition
- Author: Guy Adams
- Language: English
- Genre: Mystery novels
- Publisher: Titan Books
- Publication date: 2012
- Media type: Print (Paperback)
- ISBN: 9780857689337 (first U.S. edition, paperback)

Sherlock Holmes: The Army of Dr. Moreau is a Sherlock Holmes pastiche novel by Guy Adams, originally published in 2012. It is Adams' second Sherlock Holmes novel after The Breath of God and contains elements of The Island of Doctor Moreau.

== Plot ==
An investigation of several murder victims which appear to be animal attacks leads Sherlock Holmes to Dr. Moreau.

== Reception ==
Publishers Weekly found that the novel provided "more action than deduction" and found the ending to be "over-the-top" but felt that Adams' "obvious affection for the characters will leave more traditional Sherlockians hoping he'll uses his gifts at recreating them in a less-fantastic narrative." Seattle Post-Intelligencer found the book interesting but warned readers that it "bears little similarity" to Conan Doyle's original stories to Conan Doyle's original stories. The British Fantasy Society felt that Adams created an authentic-feeling world and summed it up as "Pulp. Schlock. Fun."
