= The Whitechapel Horrors =

1992 mystery pastiche novel by Edward B. Hanna

- First edition
- Author: Edward B. Hanna
- Language: English
- Genre: Mystery
- Published: 1992 (Carroll & Graff); 29 October 2010 (Titan Books)
- Publication place: United Kingdom
- Media type: Novel
- Pages: 480
- ISBN: 078670019X (first edition)

The Whitechapel Horrors is a 1992 mystery pastiche novel written by Edward B. Hanna, featuring Sherlock Holmes and Dr. John Watson investigating the Jack the Ripper murders.

Titan Books reprinted the book in 2010, as part of its The Further Adventures of Sherlock Holmes series, which collects a number of noted Holmesian pastiches.

== Plot ==
A sadistic murderer stalks the streets of Whitechapel in London's East End. Sherlock Holmes is called in to investigate, but as the investigation into the grisly named Jack The Ripper continues, Holmes realizes there's more at stake than just stopping a serial killer.

== Reception ==
Kirkus Reviews felt that the revelation of Jack the Ripper's identity was "inventive and original" and the best part of the novel. Publishers Weekly called it "remarkably fresh and inventive" and praised the authenticity of the novel. Dread Central felt that it was the "first misstep" in Titan Books Further Adventures series and found it overly detailed and devoid of a satisfying resolution. Blasting News was in agreement calling it "too long, and not dramatic enough to warrant the length."

== See also ==
- Sherlock Holmes pastiches
- A Study in Terror
- Dust and Shadow: An Account of the Ripper Killings by Dr. John H. Watson
- Murder by Decree
