= Goldtiger =

British graphic novel

- The cover to Goldtiger, art by Jimmy Broxton (under the pseudonym Antonio Barreti).
- Date: 10 March 2016
- Main characters: Lily Gold; Jack Tiger
- Page count: 128 pages
- Publisher: Rebellion Developments

Creative team
- Writers: Guy Adams
- Artists: Jimmy Broxton
- Creators: Guy Adams; Jimmy Broxton
- Editors: Lucy Forrester

Original publication
- Date of publication: 10 March 2016
- ISBN: 9781781084717

Goldtiger (subtitled Goldtiger: The Poseidon Complex) is a British graphic novel, first published by Rebellion Developments in 2016, and promoted in conjunction with the company's 2000 AD comic. The book tells the history of short-lived and controversial spy-themed newspaper comic strip "Goldtiger" by acclaimed Italian artist Antonio Barreti and science fiction novelist Louis Schaeffer, interspersed with the strips themselves. It was the first comic to bear the 2000 AD branding without having appeared in the comic previously.

The graphic novel is a false document; Barreti, Shaeffer, "Goldtiger" and their histories were created by writer Guy Adams and artist Jimmy Broxton, who use a variety of pseudonyms and pastiche various comic and magazine styles across the book. Beyond absurd and occasionally implausible turns in the purported history of the strip, the graphic novel features no overt disclaimers.

== Fictional Premise ==
=== Creation ===
In response to the massive success of "Modesty Blaise", the Baskerville Newspaper Group commissioned minor science fiction author Louis Schaeffer and talented but eccentric Italian artist Antonio Barreti to create a spy thriller newspaper strip for syndication. To the surprise of the publisher, the first serial - "The Poseidon Complex" - was handed over to them as a completed work. More surprisingly, the work was permissive even by the progressive Swinging Sixties' standards - primary characters Lily Gold and Jack Tiger were both openly homosexual. Left with a story most newspapers would not print, both the publishers and writer Schaeffer (who needed the strip to succeed for financial reasons) tried to bring Barreti's excesses under control, without success. With English newspapers unwilling to run the strip, Baskerville only manage to sell the rights to a few obscure publications - European newspapers The Daily Clarion of Malta and Diario Moraira of Spain, and German left-wing magazine Ausflippen - and pulled the plug. Barreti subsequently suffered a nervous breakdown.

=== Goldtiger ===
Running chic London boutique Goldtiger isn't enough for Lily Gold and Jack Tiger, so the thrillseeking pair of fashion designers seek adventure on the side. After several boats vanish on the Thames, the pair's investigation leads them to amphibious reptile man Sobek, who is to using a Transubstantiation Ray to turn people into liquid, which he then filters to extract valuable substances.

Battling Lily, Sobek gains the upper hand but the sight of her being strangled in the villain's base is too much for Barreti. Having already appeared in the strip earlier to bemoan the script, he enters the frame and helps, allowing Lily to kill Sobek with a giant pencil before creating a deus ex machina to stop his henchman by simply unplugging the base's powerful supply. Now seemingly unable to leave the frame, Barreti is adopted by Gold and Tiger as a companion.

=== Cancellation ===
Having only discovered how far the uncommunicative Barreti had strayed from his scripts when reading the strip in print, Schaeffer attempted to regain control by sketching several strips himself. In protest, Barreti simply submitted Schaeffer's crude drawings as the finished art. Exasperated, Schaeffer instead wrote a novelisation of "The Poseidon Complex" for publisher Club Books before quitting; an excerpt from the book is used to bridge one of the gaps in the narrative caused by Barreti's disregard for storytelling. A film based on the comic commenced production under an Italian exploitation studio, starring Edwige Fenech and Terence Stamp, but was abandoned during filming for unclear reasons.

The strip did however prove a surprise success in Malta, and the Clarion commissioned Barreti to continue the work after Baskerville withdrew. Even though Barreti had been committed, Schaeffer continued to send him scripts to work on. Despite the stories growing ever-more surreal "Goldtiger" ran in the Daily Clarion until 1975, only ending when sporadic communication with the artist suddenly ended. The following year Schaeffer, having failed to carve out the serious literary career he craved, reportedly died in a boating accident off the coast of Corsica.

In 1977, Barreti reappeared when word reached him that IPC Magazines were launching a new science fiction weekly comic called 2000 AD. Updating the characters to a futuristic setting, Barreti submitted "Goldtiger 2000" unsolicited. As with his dealings with Baskerville, Barreti submitted a large number of pages as a finished work rather than working with the editorial team in any way. From the start "Goldtiger 2000" had heavy sexual overtones, and was rejected out of hand. An attempt to ship the strip to a less discerning publisher as part of a mooted comic called Roller also came to nothing, and Barreti returned to obscurity.

=== Goldtiger 2000 ===
In the 39th century, non-reproductive sex is strictly forbidden. Space pilot Lily Gold and mercenary Jack Tiger are among those outlawed due to their refusal to abandon their homosexuality and breed, instead leading a rebellion against the Procreation Protectorate from the spaceship Goldtiger, helped by loyal robot companion Buzz.

=== Rediscovery ===
Following the collapse of "Goldtiger 2000", Baretti returned to psychiatric care; nothing further is known of his life. "Goldtiger" retained a considerable cult following in Malta, and later among comics historians. One such fan was Leonard King, who attempted to compile the strip for small publishing company Humdrumming Books in 2002; however, he found the original artwork had been lost and had to work from incomplete newspaper cuttings saved by a young Maltese fan, before the volume was abandoned.

Some years later 2000 AD artist Jimmy Broxton was approached by a man only known as Marcelo at a Maltese comic convention who gave him a huge parcel of Barreti's original artwork. He alerted collaborator Guy Adams and the pair began extensive research into "Goldtiger". While finding much of the documentation missing and many of those involved in the strip died, the pair were able to discover some material during research for the book. These included a Wave Radio interview with Schaeffer (during which he consistently attempts to steer conversation away from "Goldtiger" in favour of his literary works), the manuscript for Schaeffer's unfinished autobiography Words for Money, a biographical article on Barreti from Peter Floyd's 1982 book Three Panels Away - The History of the British Newspaper Strip, correspondence between various parties; and a rare interview with Barreti from British underground magazine Deadbeats. Most of the materials reveal the difficulties of dealing with the idiosyncratic artist, while also suggesting the death of Barreti's sister Adriana in 1966 was a major factor in his deteriorating mental health.

== Creation ==
Broxton and Adams, who had worked together on "Hope" for 2000 AD, used crowdfunding website Kickstarter to raise backing for the project, beginning in 2013. The initial announcements made no attempt to hide that the project was entirely fictional, though Broxton was initially listed as James Hodgkins. Goldtiger soon passed its initial £12,000 target. Crowdfunding the title allowed the creators to ensure high quality production, such as making the volume a hardback. Several pledge levels were created, including a limited edition of 100 books that were presented in a 'treasury' format, which came in a tray case including an additional booklet, prints and an exclusive sketch. Broxton would claim that while he came up with the idea of making the volume a lost artefact, it was Adams who effectively created the work itself, and came up with the idea of making the metafictional creators and colourful history.

The project was greenlit in June 2015, and Goldtiger was to be the comic to use the 2000 AD brand that hadn't appeared previously in the comic itself. To add to its unusual nature and play into the conceit it was a factual document, the book was produced in a landscape format. While Adams and Broxton planned to reveal the product to Kickstarter backers first a listing was accidentally created on Amazon.com and reported by Bleeding Cool before this could be done. Broxton's involvement was also confirmed by the listing, though already some knew James Hodgkins was the birth name of Broxton, which he had used as an inker before moving into pencilling.

Much of the promotional material publicising Goldtiger played along with the graphic novel's conceit. An article promoting the book was also published in Judge Dredd Megazine #370. Written by the magazine's regular feature writer Karl Stock, this also played along with the conceit, and was accompanied by the complete "Goldtiger 2000" strip by way of a preview. A similar piece was featured by Broken Frontier. The narrative and format of Goldtiger was purposefully created so both the behind the scenes history and the comic-within-a-comic could be continued in further volumes, but as of 2026 no sequels have been announced.

== Reception ==
Chris Sims praised the graphic novel while writing for ComicsAlliance; he admitted to initial concern that either the false comic strip or the metafictional history would overshadow the other but found they meshed perfectly, surmising that Goldtiger was "a book that's more than the sum of its parts. It manages to be a thrilling throwback adventure, a meta-commentary, and the story of two damaged, incompatible creators all at once, and despite my initial misgivings, it's impossible to separate all of those stories out from each other". Ian Keogh also lauded Goldtiger, calling it "a very clever and stylish pastiche", also noting how well the strips and purported production material complemented each other.
