= Angel Eyes (novel) =

Novel by Loren D. Estleman

- First edition
- Author: Loren D. Estleman
- Language: English
- Series: Amos Walker #2
- Genre: Crime fiction
- Publisher: Houghton Mifflin
- Publication date: September 1981
- Publication place: United States
- Media type: Print (Hardcover)
- Pages: 203pp
- ISBN: 0-395-31558-1
- OCLC: 7278607
- Dewey Decimal: 813/.54 19
- LC Class: PS3555.S84 A83
- Preceded by: Motor City Blue
- Followed by: The Midnight Man

Angel Eyes is a novel by Loren D. Estleman, second in the Private Investigator Amos Walker series.

== Plot summary ==
An exotic dancer, Ann Maringer's life is in danger, she is scared and sure someone is out to get her. Ann turns to Amos Walker the irascible private-eye from Detroit but then disappears and Walker is out to find out what happened and where she is.
