= The Ripper Legacy =

2016 novel by David Stuart Davies

- Author: David Stuart Davies
- Language: English
- Genre: Mystery
- Published: 19 July 2016 (Titan Books)
- Publication place: United Kingdom
- Media type: Novel
- Pages: 224
- ISBN: 9781783296590 (first edition)

The Ripper Legacy is a mystery pastiche novel written by David Stuart Davies, featuring Sherlock Holmes and Dr. John Watson in a story with ties to Jack the Ripper.

Titan Books published the book in 2016, as part of its Further Adventures series, which collects a number of noted Holmesian pastiches.

== Plot ==
A child has been abducted, yet there's no ransom note. When Holmes and Watson take up the case, they find a sinister connection to the heights of Victorian society. But just what is the missing child's connection with the infamous killings in Whitechapel?

== See also ==
- Sherlock Holmes pastiches
- A Study in Terror
- Dust and Shadow: An Account of the Ripper Killings by Dr. John H. Watson
- Murder by Decree
