= Amos Walker =

- First appearance: Motor City Blue
- Created by: Loren D. Estleman

In-universe information
- Gender: Male
- Occupation: Private detective
- Nationality: American

Amos Walker is a fictional private detective in a series of more than thirty novels and short stories written over the course of five decades by Loren D. Estleman. Publishers Weekly has called author Estleman "arguably the finest [living] practitioner of hard-boiled private eye fiction with his Amos Walker novels," and the series has won multiple Shamus Awards from the Private-Eye Writers of America (PWA), including a Lifetime Achievement Award for the author.

Walker works in Detroit and lives on the Detroit-Hamtramck border. A Vietnam veteran who boxed in college and served as a military policeman, he is sharp and streetwise. Like all good private investigators, Amos has an independent and pugnacious streak: While still in the police academy, he was fired from the Detroit Police for punching out a creepy but connected fellow cadet in the shower. On his first appearance, in Motor City Blue (set around 1980), Amos is in his thirties, and he ages over the course of subsequent novels.

Amos Walker is a traditionalist. As one reviewer noted:

Like Estleman, who pecks out his books on a 1967 Olympia manual typewriter, Walker is wa-a-ay low-tech. At one point, the middle-aged P.I. turns on his cell phone and draws its antenna out with his teeth. (When was the last time you saw a cell phone with a retractable antenna?!)

The Thrilling Detective website stated:

Walker is definitely a throwback to another time, an unapologetically old-fashioned, defiantly politically-incorrect gumshoe — but it could certainly be argued that that’s part of his charm. It often seems he has no use for anything since WWII. That includes feminists, liberals, gun control, gun nuts, civil rights, politicians, foreign cars, modern cars, cellphones, television, non-smokers, etc., etc., etc. But he’s an equal opportunity crank — he spits on both sides of the glass. He’s a hard-drinking, chain-smoking tough guy who “dresses like the late show” and is twice as tough as he talks, which is plenty tough. He can also be an incredible pain in the ass — just ask the authorities. He’s always bitching, snapping out wisecracks worthy of Chandler about something, be it women or pollution or seatbelts or whatever. This guy’s not so much a cynic sometimes as an uncompromising crank — the Oscar the Grouch of private eyes.

== Bibliography ==
1. Motor City Blue
2. Angel Eyes
3. The Midnight Man
4. The Glass Highway
5. Sugartown
6. Every Brilliant Eye
7. Lady Yesterday
8. Downriver
9. General Murders: Amos Walker Mysteries (1988; ten short stories)
10. Silent Thunder
11. Sweet Women Lie (1990)
12. Never Street
13. The Witchfinder
14. The Hours of the Virgin
15. A Smile on the Face of the Tiger
16. Sinister Heights
17. Poison Blonde
18. Retro (2004)
19. Nicotine Kiss (2006)
20. American Detective (2007)
21. Left-handed Dollar (2010)
22. Amos Walker: The Complete Story Collection (2010; short stories)
23. Infernal Angels (2011)
24. Burning Midnight (2012)
25. Don't Look for Me (2014)
26. You Know Who Killed Me (2014)
27. The Sundown Speech (2015)
28. The Lioness Is the Hunter (2017)
29. Black and White Ball (2018)
30. When Old Midnight Comes Along (2019)
31. Cutthroat Dogs (2021)
32. Monkey in the Middle (2022)
33. City Walls (2023)
