= The Shadow of Reichenbach Falls =

2008 novel by John R. King

- First edition
- Author: John R. King
- Language: English
- Genre: Adventure, Mystery
- Published: 2008 (Forge Books)
- Publication place: United States
- Media type: Novel
- Pages: 352
- ISBN: 978-0765318015 (first edition)

The Shadow of Reichenbach Falls is a 2008 mystery pastiche novel written by John R. King, that presents an alternate account of the battle between Sherlock Holmes and his nemesis Professor Moriarty; originally depicted in The Final Problem.

== Plot ==
As he tours Europe, Thomas Carnacki ends up in Meiringen, Switzerland and upon visiting Reichenbach Falls he stumbles upon Holmes and Moriarty locked in mortal combat. One man goes over the falls and as Carnacki comes to his assistance he is fired upon by the other.

The story is told in three distinct parts: the first is narrated by Carnacki, the second from the memoirs of Moriarty, and the final section by Sherlock Holmes.

== Reception ==
Publishers Weekly described the book as "muddled" and "gimmicky". Kirkus Reviews was more positive and claimed the novel may create new fans of William Hope Hodgson's Carnacki.

== See also ==
- Sherlock Holmes: The Breath of God
- Sherlock Holmes pastiches
