= The Revenge of the Hound =

1987 novel by Michael Hardwick

- Author: Michael Hardwick
- Language: English
- Genre: Mystery novels
- Publisher: Villard Books
- Publication date: 1987
- Media type: Print (hardback & paperback)

The Revenge of the Hound is a Sherlock Holmes pastiche novel by Michael Hardwick, originally published in 1987. It is Hardwick's second Holmes novel after 1979's The Prisoner of the Devil.

The acclaimed novel, a semi-sequel to The Hound of the Baskervilles, was authorized by the Conan Doyle estate.

== Reception ==
Kirkus Reviews called the book "the most authentic and convincing post-Conan Doyle Holmes adventure to date." Publishers Weekly felt that "while it faithfully echoes a Holmesian novel in tone and design, this latest effort seems to lack any life of its own." The Los Angeles Times called Hardwick's detail "predictably perfect" and predicted that Sherlockians "should take to the book as to comfortable old slippers." January Magazine called it "a fine and faithful extension of The Hound of the Baskervilles.
