= Lyndsay Faye =

American author

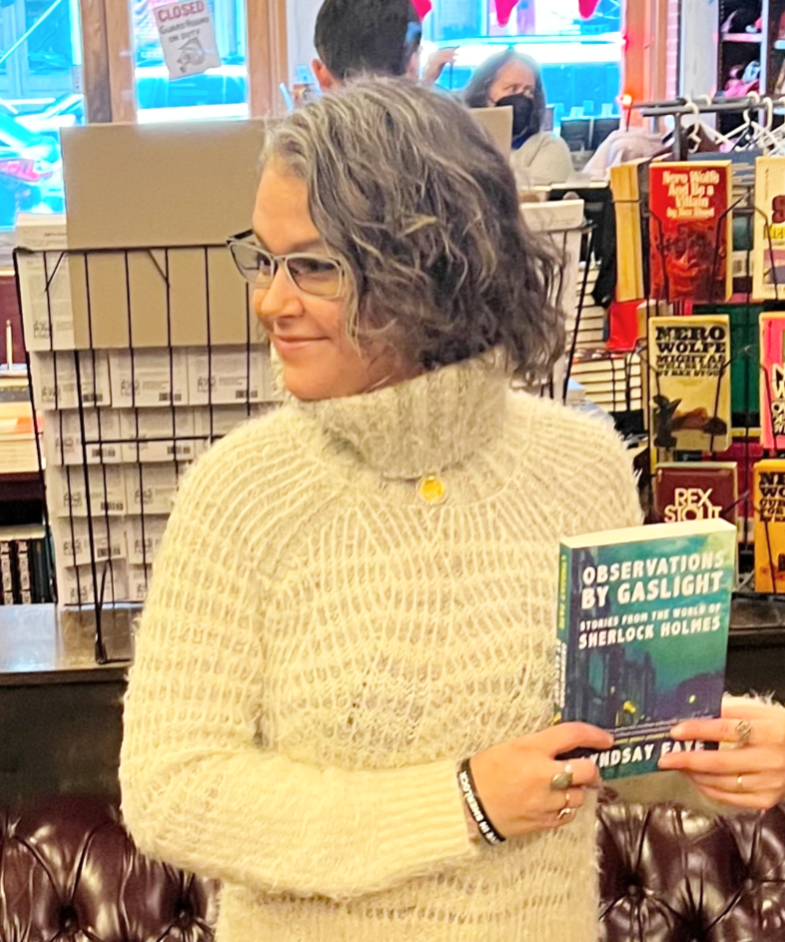
- Born: 1980 (age 45–46); Redwood City, California
- Occupation: Author
- Spouse: Nicholas Anderson
- Writing career
- Genres: Historical thrillers Sherlockiana
- Notable works: Dust and Shadow (2009); Jane Steele (2016)
- Website: lyndsayfaye.com

Lyndsay Faye is an American novelist and Sherlockian. She is known for her works of historical fiction, which draw variously on mystery and classic literature. Her novel The Gods of Gotham, published in 2012, was named "the year’s best mystery novel" by the American Library Association, and was nominated for the Edgar Award for Best Novel.

Her Sherlockiana includes Dust and Shadow: An Account of the Ripper Killings by Dr. John H. Watson and The Whole Art of Detection: Lost Mysteries of Sherlock Holmes.

== Early life and education ==
Having discovered Arthur Conan Doyle's Sherlock Holmes when she was 10, she is a member of both The Baker Street Irregulars and Baker Street Babes. Faye described Conan Doyle's influence on her writing: "You can’t escape Sherlock Holmes as a mystery writer. You simply cannot."

Faye attended R. A. Long High School.

== Career ==
=== Novels ===
Faye's debut novel, Dust and Shadow: An Account of the Ripper Killings by Dr. John H. Watson, was published in 2009. Caleb Carr said of this book: "At long last, an author of rare talent combines a thorough, enthusiastic knowledge of the Sherlock Holmes canon with truly rigorous research into, and respect for, what remains one of the greatest and most horrifying unsolved murder cases in modern history: the Jack the Ripper killings."

Faye's Timothy Wilde series includes three books: The Gods of Gotham, Seven for a Secret, and The Fatal Flame. Set in New York City in the 1840s, the trilogy's protagonist, Timothy Wilde, is a 27-year-old former bartender who is a policeman in New York’s newly formed police force.

2016's Jane Steele "reimagines Charlotte Brontë’s heroine as a killer." The Paragon Hotel, published in 2019, is set in 1921 in Portland, Oregon. Publishers Weekly called The King of Infinite Space, published in 2021, an "enthralling riff on Hamlet, set in contemporary New York City."

=== Journalism ===
Faye has written book reviews for The New York Times.

=== Philanthropy ===
Faye served as a mentor with Girls Write Now. She also chaired the annual Baker Street Babes auction to benefit the Disabled American Veterans Charitable Service Trust.

== Bibliography ==
=== Novels ===
- Faye, Lyndsay (2016). Jane Steele (hardcover 1st ed.). G. P. Putnam's Sons. ISBN 978-0399169496.
- Faye, Lyndsay (2019). The Paragon Hotel (hardcover 1st ed.). G. P. Putnam's Sons. ISBN 978-0735210752.
- Faye, Lyndsay (2021). The King of Infinite Space (hardcover 1st ed.). G. P. Putnam's Sons. ISBN 978-0525535898.

=== Sherlock Holmes ===
- Faye, Lyndsay (2009). Dust and Shadow: An Account of the Ripper Killings by Dr. John H. Watson (hardcover 1st ed.). Simon & Schuster. ISBN 978-1416583301.
- Faye, Lyndsay (2017). The Whole Art of Detection: Lost Mysteries of Sherlock Holmes (hardcover 1st ed.). Grove Atlantic. ISBN 978-0802125927.
- Faye, Lyndsay (2021). Observations by Gaslight: Stories from the World of Sherlock Holmes (hardcover 1st ed.). Mysterious Press. ISBN 978-1613162613.
- "The Case of Colonel Warburton’s Madness" in Sherlock Holmes in America (2009). ISBN 978-1602393523

=== Timothy Wilde series ===
- Faye, Lyndsay (2012). The Gods of Gotham (hardcover 1st ed.). Penguin Publishing. ISBN 978-0399158377.
- Faye, Lyndsay (2013). Seven for a Secret (hardcover 1st ed.). G.P. Putnam's Sons. ISBN 978-0399158384.
- Faye, Lyndsay (2015). The Fatal Flame (hardcover 1st ed.). G.P. Putnam's Sons. ISBN 978-0399169489.
