= Sherlock Holmes and the Hapsburg Tiara =

2003 novel by Alan Vanneman

- First edition
- Author: Alan Vanneman
- Genre: Novel; Mystery fiction Sherlock Holmes pastiche
- Published: 2003 (Carroll & Graf Publishers)
- ISBN: 978-0-7867-1297-7

Sherlock Holmes and the Hapsburg Tiara is a novel and Sherlock Holmes pastiche by Alan Vanneman, published in 2003 by Carroll & Graf Publishers. The book has received reviews from the Historical Novel Society, Publishers Weekly, and Kirkus Reviews.
