= Seance for a Vampire =

1994 novel written by Fred Saberhagen

- Author: Fred Saberhagen
- Language: English
- Genre: Horror, Mystery
- Published: Nov 1 1994 (Tom Doherty Associates); 25 June 2010 (Titan Books)
- Media type: Novel
- Pages: 310
- ISBN: 0812533488 (first edition)

Seance for a Vampire is a 1994 horror mystery pastiche novel written by Fred Saberhagen, featuring Sherlock Holmes and Dr. John Watson, alongside a re-imagined version of Count Dracula, here a heroic protagonist. The book is alternately narrated by Watson and Dracula himself, presented here as noble and witty.

Seance for a Vampire is the eighth entry in Saberhagen's "Dracula" series, and a direct sequel to the second book The Holmes-Dracula File.

Titan Books reprinted the book in 2010, as part of its Further Adventures series, which collects a number of noted Holmesian pastiches.

== Plot ==
What begins as Sherlock Holmes attempting to debunk two psychics goes awry when young Louisa Altamont appears to her grieving parents as a vampire. The resulting madness leaves one of the mystics dead, Holmes missing and Dr. Watson confounded. As time runs out, Watson has no choice but to call on Holmes' vampiric cousin, the Prince Dracula, for assistance.

== Reception ==
Dread Central gave it three out of five stars but cautioned the book really requires a reader to have read The Holmes-Dracula File first to understand many references. Publishers Weekly found the two narrators, Dracula and Dr. Watson, to be too indistinguishable and found the plot "a rather drab story."

== See also ==
- Sherlock Holmes vs. Dracula
- Anno Dracula
