= The Scroll of the Dead =

1998 novel by David Stuart Davies

- First edition
- Author: David Stuart Davies
- Language: English
- Genre: Adventure, Mystery
- Published: 1998 (Calabash Press); 13 November 2009 (Titan Books)
- Publication place: United Kingdom
- Media type: Novel
- Pages: 208
- ISBN: 1848564937 (first edition)

The Scroll of the Dead is a 1998 adventure mystery pastiche novel written by David Stuart Davies, featuring Sherlock Holmes and Dr. John Watson as they investigate a theft from the British Museum with ties to the Black Arts.

== Plot ==
After Holmes and Watson attend a bogus seance to unmask a phony psychic, they are called upon to investigate a murder and the theft of a scroll from the British Museum. As it turns out, this is but the first key towards uncovering a mysterious Egyptian tomb, and within it, a papyrus that may hold the power of eternal life.

== Background ==
While writing the novel, Davies was approached by Granada Television to have it adapted by Jeremy Paul as a two-hour film for their Sherlock Holmes series. Star Jeremy Brett objected, preferring to stick solely to the original stories by Arthur Conan Doyle.

== Reprints ==
Titan Books reprinted the book in 2009, under the title of The Further Adventures of Sherlock Holmes: The Scroll of the Dead as part of its Further Adventures series, which collects a number of noted Holmesian pastiches.

== See also ==
- Sherlock Holmes pastiches
