= The Devil's Promise =

2014 novel by David Stuart Davies

- Author: David Stuart Davies
- Language: English
- Genre: Mystery
- Published: 21 November 2014 (Titan Books)
- Publication place: United Kingdom
- Media type: Novel
- Pages: 224
- ISBN: 9781783292707 (first edition)

The Devil's Promise is a 2014 mystery pastiche novel written by David Stuart Davies, featuring Sherlock Holmes and Dr. John Watson.

Titan Books published the book in 2014, as part of its Further Adventures series, which collects a number of noted Holmesian pastiches.

== Plot ==
While investigating a mysterious corpse on a deserted beach, Holmes and Watson are attacked by the strange inhabitants of the nearby village. Then, Watson wakes up only to find that many months have passed and Holmes' behaviour is extremely odd. What had happened at that village, and what is its connection to the infamous "Devil's Companion" that so shook Holmes?

== See also ==
- Sherlock Holmes pastiches
