= The Whole Art of Detection =

2017 Sherlock Holmes book by Lyndsay Faye

The Whole Art of Detection: Lost Mysteries of Sherlock Holmes
- First edition
- Author: Lyndsay Faye
- Genre: Mystery novels
- Publisher: Mysterious Press
- Publication date: 2017
- Media type: Print (Hardback)
- ISBN: 978-0802125927 (first edition, hardback)

The Whole Art of Detection: Lost Mysteries of Sherlock Holmes is an anthology of Sherlock Holmes pastiche short stories by Lyndsay Faye. All but two of the stories have been previously published with 10 of the 15 stories originally published in The Strand Magazine in slightly different form. The stories are divided chronologically into four sections: pre-Baker Street, the early adventures of Holmes and Watson, adventures during the "great hiatus", and the retirement years. Many of the stories are based on references in the Canon of Sherlock Holmes such as "Colonel Warburton’s Madness", a reference made in "The Adventure of the Engineer's Thumb".

== Audio book ==
An audio book version was released read by Simon Vance.

== Reception ==
Nicholas Meyer, author of the Sherlock Holmes pastiche The Seven-Per-Cent Solution, said the book was worthy of sitting alongside Doyle's original stories and "is absolutely essential reading for any aficionado who cherishes the real thing." Kirkus Reviews said the stories were built on strong foundations with good use of Holmes' deductive powers towards a progressive use of the character. The Strand Magazine praised the stories saying "Faye celebrates the classic aspects of the stories, without feeling the need to change or rearrange certain character traits or habits, add new perspectives, or inflate certain plot points out of all proportion." Leslie S. Klinger, editor of The New Annotated Sherlock Holmes praised the book saying "For those who despair that Arthur Conan Doyle only gave us 60 stories of Holmes, rejoice! Here are 15 more treasures!"
