= The Quick and the Dead (collection) =

1965 collection of stories by author Vincent Starrett

- Dust-jacket illustration by Frank Utpatel for The Quick and the Dead
- Author: Vincent Starrett
- Cover artist: Frank Utpatel
- Language: English
- Genre: Fantasy, horror
- Publisher: Arkham House
- Publication date: 1965
- Publication place: United States
- Media type: Print (hardback)
- Pages: 145 pp

The Quick and the Dead is a collection of stories by author Vincent Starrett. It was released in 1965 and was the author's only collection of stories published by Arkham House. It was released in an edition of 2,047 copies. The stories were originally published between 1920 and 1932 in various pulp magazines.

== Contents ==
The Quick and the Dead contains the following tales:

1. "The Fugitive"
2. "The Man in the Cask"
3. "The Quick and the Dead"
4. "The Sinless Village"
5. "The Head of Cromwell"
6. "Penelope"
7. "The Elixir of Death"
8. "Coffins for Two"
9. "The Tattooed Man"
10. "Footsteps of Fear"
