= David Stuart Davies =

British writer (1946–2024)

David Stuart Davies (10 February 1946 – 16 August 2024) was a British writer. He worked as a teacher of English before becoming a full-time editor, writer, and playwright. Davies wrote extensively about Sherlock Holmes, both fiction and non-fiction. He was the editor of Red Herrings, the monthly in-house publication of the Crime Writers' Association, and a member of The Baker Street Irregulars and the Detection Club. Davies died on 16 August 2024, at the age of 78.

== Novels ==
=== Sherlock Holmes Adventures ===
1. Sherlock Holmes and the Hentzau Affair (1991): A crossover with characters from The Prisoner of Zenda. Holmes and Watson are engaged to solve the disappearance of Rudolf Rassendyll.
2. The Tangled Skein (1992): Holmes battles Count Dracula in a re-imagining of the events of the Bram Stoker novel.
3. The Scroll of the Dead (1998): Holmes and Dr. Watson pursue an ancient Egyptian treasure with links to immortality.
4. Shadow of the Rat (1999): Holmes investigates the Giant Rat of Sumatra.
5. The Veiled Detective (2004): An alternate account of the relationship between Holmes and Watson that posits Watson as an agent of Professor Moriarty.
6. The Games Afoot (2008): A short story collection edited by Davies.
7. The Devil's Promise (2014): An investigation into a corpse on the coast leaves Watson in a months long coma, and Holmes acting suspiciously.
8. The Ripper Legacy (2016): Holmes and Watson look into a child's kidnapping that is connected to the Jack the Ripper killings.
9. The Instrument of Death (2019): A crossover with The Cabinet of Dr. Caligari.
10. Revenge from the Grave (2022): Holmes and Watson are once again pitted against the late Professor Moriarty's gang.

=== Johnny One Eye ===
Johnny Hawke is removed from the army after a rifle explodes in his face and he loses an eye. Offered a desk job with the police, Johnny sets up as a private investigator in London. When asked to investigate the disappearance of a young woman things turn dangerous. Could there be a connection between the girl and fading film actor Gordon Moore?

1. Forests of the Night (2000)
2. Comes the Dark (2006)
3. Without Conscience (2008)
4. Requiem for a Dummy (2009)
5. The Darkness of Death (2010)
6. A Taste for Blood (2013)

=== Detective Inspector Paul Snow ===
1. Brothers in Blood (2013)
2. Innocent Blood (2015)
3. Blood Rites (2017)

== Non-fiction ==
His non-fiction books about Sherlock Holmes include:

- Holmes of the Movies: The Screen Career of Sherlock Holmes (1977)
- Bending the Willow: Jeremy Brett as Sherlock Holmes (1996; revised 2002)
- Starring Sherlock Holmes: A Century of the Master Detective on Screen (2001, updated 2007)
- Clued Up on Sherlock (2004)
- Dancing in the Moonlight: Jeremy Brett - A Celebration (2006)

== Plays ==
His award-winning one-man play Sherlock Holmes - The Last Act toured after its premiere at Salisbury Playhouse in 1999. It has played in France, Canada, United States, Hong Kong, Malta and all over the British Isles.

In 2009, Big Finish Productions released audio adaptations of his plays The Last Act and The Death and Life, starring Roger Llewellyn. They also adapted The Tangled Skein into a two-part audio drama starring Nicholas Briggs.

== Other work ==
Davies was the editor of several collections for Wordsworth & Collectors Library (Barnes & Noble) including:

- The Best of Sherlock Holmes
- Shadows of Sherlock Holmes
- Stories from the Nineteenth Century
- Tales of Unease
- Return From the Dead

In 2009 an omnibus volume of William Fryer Harvey's stories, titled "The Beast with Five Fingers" was published (ISBN 978-1-84022-179-4). The volume contains 45 stories, and an extensive biographical introduction.

His DVD work includes writing and narrating commentaries for the MPI release of the digitally re-mastered Basil Rathbone Holmes films; conducting interviews on the new Jeremy Brett Holmes releases; and with David Jason on A Touch of Frost DVDs.

Davies was one-third of the literary performance group The Mystery Men, alongside Matthew Booth and M. J. Elliott.
