= Sherlock Holmes vs. Dracula =

1978 novel by Loren D. Estleman

- First edition
- Author: Loren D. Estleman
- Cover artist: Fred Marcellino
- Language: English
- Genre: Mystery novels
- Publisher: Doubleday
- Publication date: 1978
- Media type: Print (hardback & paperback)
- ISBN: 0-385-14051-7 (hardcover)

Sherlock Holmes vs. Dracula (or The Adventures of the Sanguinary Count) is a Sherlock Holmes pastiche novel by Loren D. Estleman, originally published in 1978.

The novel is an account of Holmes' adventure facing off against Bram Stoker's Dracula and is presented as a revision of the Stoker novel, albeit with Sherlock Holmes present in the narrative.

The book has since been republished by I-Books and Titan Books, the latter under their Further Adventures of Sherlock Holmes banner.

== Reception ==
British Fantasy Society called the book "one of the better" Dracula/Holmes crossovers. Kirkus Reviews called it "an example of the more cautious and studied sort of pseudo-Sherlock...Not that the purist approach makes Estleman's academic, short-story-sized notion any more prepossessing."

== Adaptations ==
Estleman's novel was adapted for BBC Radio in 1981. It has since been rebroadcast numerous times.

== See also ==
- Seance for a Vampire, a Holmes-Dracula crossover by Fred Saberhagen
- Anno Dracula
