= Pierre Bayard =

French writer

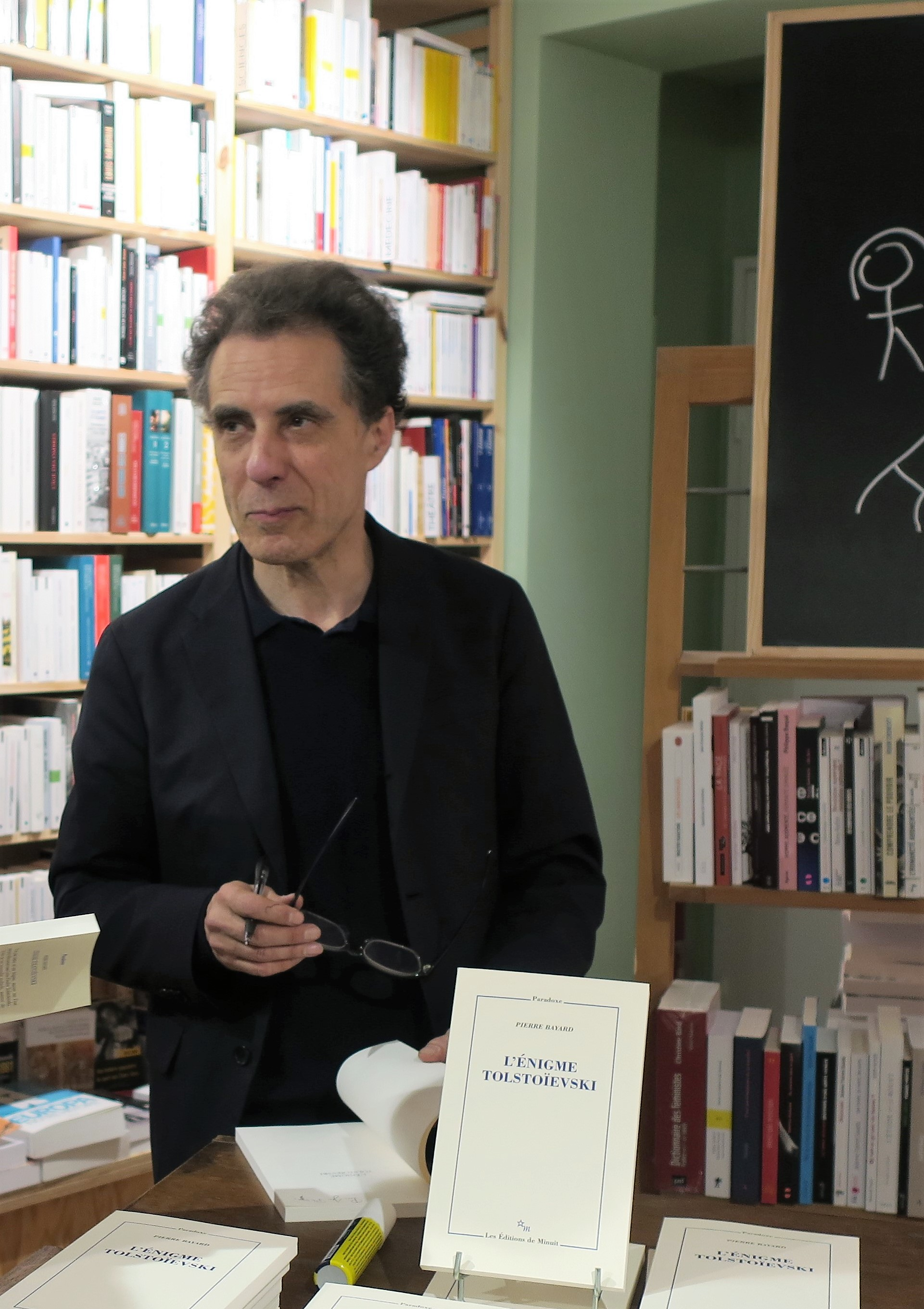
Pierre Bayard (2017): Born / 1954 (Paris); Education / École Normale Supérieure (ULM); Occupation / Professor, Psychoanalyst, Author

Pierre Bayard (French: [pjɛʁ bajaʁ]; born 1954) is professor of Literature at the University of Paris 8 and psychoanalyst. He is the author of many creative essays such as Who Killed Roger Ackroyd? (2002), How to Talk about Books You Haven't Read (2007), and Sherlock Holmes Was Wrong (2008).

== Creations ==
Pierre Bayard is the founder of "interventionist criticism", he is opposed to neutral and uncommitted criticism of literary works. In the course of his essays, he has, among other things, chased down unpunished literary criminals (due to the negligence of their creators), provided tips and tricks for talking about books and places that have not been read or seen, or reflected on the resistance/collaboration dilemma.

Bayard's most popular book, How to Talk about Books You Haven't Read (Minuit, 2007), is a bestseller in France in which he engages in a study of the different ways of not reading a book, and recommends solutions to be able to talk about it anyway. Assuming that some readers have a terrifying understanding of reading, he tries to make them feel free from guilt for not having read canonical literature. The essential thing in culture being to have an overview, he claims the possibility of having a perforated and incomplete culture. Pierre Bayard has renewed this system in Comment parler des lieux où l'on n'a pas été, a work in the second degree again, in which he reviews the authors who have spoken of places they have not visited.

His books have been considered as cases of "novelistic criticism", in that they present revisionist readings of famous fictional mysteries. In his 2008 book L'Affaire du Chien des Baskerville, for example, published in English as Sherlock Holmes Was Wrong: Re-opening the Case of the Hound of the Baskervilles he analyzes the famous Sherlock Holmes case, and in his earlier book Who Killed Roger Ackroyd? he re-investigates Agatha Christie's novel The Murder of Roger Ackroyd.

In 2019 returned to an other book by Agatha Christie, And Then There Were None and questioned the solution delivered to the outcome of her novel. His entire book is therefore the counter-investigation that must restore the truth: we find in fact the procedure he already used earlier: attempts to rectify certain fictional police investigations that he considers unlikely. And he proposes to come back to a new literary misunderstanding and shed light on a mystery that no one has solved, not even Agatha Christie. The novelty this time being that he lets the real murderer of the And Then There Were None speak for himself to lead us to the only acceptable solution.

His book on Hamlet argues that Claudius did not kill Hamlet's father. In these essays on Agatha Christie, Shakespeare and Conan Doyle, he engages in real literary counter-investigations, studying the motivations of the characters, highlighting the inconsistencies of the intrigues and humorously showing that fictional characters escape their creators.

Moreover, humour is a fundamental element of his writing. In How to Talk about Books You Haven't Read, the narrator teaches the way not to read, which is a joke because he himself is a great reader. For Pierre Bayard, humour has an analytical function. It allows you to mark a gap between yourself and yourself, and therefore to distance yourself from what you read.

== Bibliography ==
- Balzac et le troc de l"imaginaire. Lecture de La Peau de chagrin (Lettres modernes-Minard, 1978).
- Symptôme de Stendhal. Armance et l’aveu (Lettres modernes-Minard, 1980).
- Il était deux fois Romain Gary (Presses universitaires de France, 1990).
- Le Paradoxe du menteur. Sur Laclos (Minuit, 1993).
- Maupassant, juste avant Freud (Minuit, 1994).
- Le Hors-sujet. Proust et la digression (Minuit, 1996).
- Qui a tué Roger Ackroyd? (Minuit, 1998 et « Reprise », 2002).
- Lire avec Freud. Pour Jean Bellemin-Noël, dir. Pierre Bayard (Presses universitaires de France, 1998).
- Comment améliorer les œuvres ratées? (Minuit, 2000).
- Enquête sur Hamlet. Le Dialogue de sourds (Minuit, 2002).
- Le Détour par les autres arts. Pour Marie-Claire Ropars, dir. Pierre Bayard et Christian Doumet (L’Improviste, 2004).
- Peut-on appliquer la littérature à la psychanalyse (Minuit, 2004).
- Demain est écrit (Minuit, 2005).
- Comment parler des livres que l'on n'a pas lus? (Minuit, 2007).
- Sherlock Holmes Was Wrong (Minuit, 2008).
- Le Plagiat par anticipation (Minuit, 2009).
- Et si les œuvres changeaient d'auteur? (Minuit, 2010).
- Comment parler des lieux où l’on n’a pas été? (Minuit, 2012).
- Aurais-je été résistant ou bourreau? (Minuit, 2013).
- Il existe d’autres mondes, Minuit, 2014
- Aurais-je sauvé Geneviève Dixmer ?, Minuit, 2015
- Le Titanic fera naufrage, Minuit, 2016
- L'énigme Tolstoïevski, Minuit, 2017
- La vérité sur "Dix petits nègres", Minuit, 2019
- Comment parler des faits qui ne se sont pas produits ?, Minuit, 2020
- Oedipe n'est pas coupable, Minuit, 2021, ISBN 9782707347107
- Et si les Beatles n'étaient pas nés ?, Minuit, 2022
- Hitchcock s'est trompé, Minuit, 2023
- Aurais-je été sans peur et sans reproche ? Le chevalier Bayard et moi, Minuit, 2024
- Je sommes plusieurs. Sur les personnalités multiples, Minuit, 2025
