= Sherlock Holmes Was Wrong =

2007 book by Pierre Bayard

- First U.S. edition cover
- Author: Pierre Bayard
- Original title: L'affaire du Chien des Baskerville
- Translator: Charlotte Mandell
- Language: French
- Genre: Literary criticism
- Publisher: Bloomsbury USA (English translation)
- Publication place: France
- English publication date: November 2008
- Pages: 208
- ISBN: 978-1-59691-605-0
- OCLC: 216941820
- Dewey Decimal: 823.912 22
- LC Class: PR4622.H63 B3913 2008

Sherlock Holmes was Wrong: Re-opening the Case of the "Hound of the Baskervilles" is a 2007 book by French professor of literature, psychoanalyst, and author Pierre Bayard.

By re-examining the clues and interpreting them in the context in which Arthur Conan Doyle's book The Hound of the Baskervilles was conceived and written, Bayard clears the hound of all wrongdoing and argues that the actual murderer got away with the crime completely unsuspected by Sherlock Holmes—not to mention by the numerous readers of the story over the past century and even, in a sense, by the author himself.

The book was originally written in French.

== Critical reception ==
The University of Illinois' The Online Gargoyle wrote in its review that the premise of the book "is original, but it is annoying in its uncreative, hole-poking nature."
