= Michael Hardwick =

British author

John Michael Drinkrow Hardwick (10 September 1924 − 4 March 1991), known as Michael Hardwick, was an English author who was best known for writing books and radio plays which featured Sir Arthur Conan Doyle's creation Sherlock Holmes. He adapted most of the episodes of the Sherlock Holmes BBC radio series 1952–1969.

== Personal life ==
Hardwick was born on 10 September 1924 in Leeds, Yorkshire and married fellow author Mollie Hardwick in 1961. Together they co-wrote numerous different books, not just on the subject of Sherlock Holmes, but also Charles Dickens, Anthony Trollope, George Bernard Shaw and other giants of the literary landscape. Between them they also produced novelisations from successful television series such as Upstairs, Downstairs, The Cedar Tree, Bergerac, The Chinese Detective and Tenko.

== Sherlock Holmes ==
Hardwick penned a dramatisation of "The Adventure of the Beryl Coronet" for the BBC Light Programme in 1959, which starred Carleton Hobbs as Sherlock Holmes and Norman Shelley as Doctor Watson. With his wife he wrote a 1963 radio play The Man Who Was Sherlock Holmes. In 1968, they dramatized The Adventure of the Dancing Men and The Sign of the Four for the BBC's television adaptation of Sherlock Holmes, starring Peter Cushing as Holmes and Nigel Stock as Watson, but only the latter exists in the BBC's archives. The two also authored a novelization of Billy Wilder's film, The Private Life of Sherlock Holmes.

Some of Hardwick's adaptions for Hobbs and Shelley were translated into German and broadcast by Bayerischer Rundfunk in the 1960s starring Peter Pasetti as Holmes and various actors as Watson.

In 1979, Hardwick wrote The Prisoner of the Devil which features Holmes called in to solve the case of the Dreyfus affair. The 1980s brought Hardwick's sequel to The Hound of the Baskervilles, entitled The Revenge of the Hound published by Villard Books, as well as The Private Life of Dr. Watson and Sherlock Holmes: My Life and Crimes.

== List of works ==
=== Fiction ===
- Sherlock Holmes Investigates (1963); with Mollie Hardwick, editors – selected from Conan Doyle's original stories & introduced for new readers
- Four Sherlock Holmes Plays: One-Act Plays (1964); with Mollie Hardwick
- The Game's Afoot: Sherlock Holmes Plays (1969); with Mollie Hardwick
- The Private Life of Sherlock Holmes (1970); with Mollie Hardwick – from the original screenplay by Billy Wilder and I. A. L. Diamond
- The Pallisers (1973); introduction – abridged omnibus edition of Anthony Trollope's series of six novels
- Mr. Hudson's Diary – Upstairs, Downstairs (1973)
- Mr. Bellamy's Story – Upstairs, Downstairs (1974)
- The Inheritors (1974)
- On With the Dance – Upstairs, Downstairs (1975)
- Endings and Beginnings – Upstairs, Downstairs (1975)
- The Upstairs Downstairs Omnibus (1975); with Mollie Hardwick
- The Four Musketeers (The Revenge of Milady) (1975)
- The Man Who Would Be King (1975); from the screenplay by John Huston and Gladys Hall
- The Gaslight Boy (1976); with Mollie Hardwick
- The Cedar Tree – vol. 1 (1976)
- Autumn of an Age – The Cedar Tree, vol. 2 (1977)
- A Bough Breaks – The Cedar Tree, vol. 3 (1978)
- Regency Royal (1978)
- The Prisoner of the Devil (1979)
- Regency Rake (1979)
- Regency Revenge (1980)
- The Chinese Detective (1981)
- Bergerac. The Jersey Cop (1981)
- The Barchester Chronicles (1982); editor – abridged omnibus edition of Trollope's series & based on the TV series
- The Private Life of Doctor Watson: Being the Personal Reminiscences of John H. Watson, M.D. (1983)
- Sherlock Holmes: My Life and Crimes (1984)
- Last Tenko (1984)
- The Revenge of the Hound (1987)
- Nightbone (1989)

=== Non-fiction ===
- Emigrant in Motley: The Journey of Charles and Ellen Kean in Quest of a Theatrical Fortune in Australia and America, as told in their hitherto unpublished letters (1954); editor, with a foreword by Anthony Quayle
- The Verdict of the Court (1960); editor, with an introduction by Lord Birkett – six famous trials
- The Jolly Toper: A Light-Hearted Social History of Drinking (1961); with Mollie Greenhalgh/Hardwick
- Doctors on Trial (1961) – the trials of Smethurst, Pritchard, Lamson, Crippen and Ruxton
- The Sherlock Holmes Companion (1962); with Mollie Hardwick
- The Man Who Was Sherlock Holmes (1964); with Mollie Hardwick
- The Charles Dickens Companion (1965); with Mollie Hardwick
- The Plague and the Fire of London (1966); with Mollie Hardwick
- The World's Greatest Sea Mysteries (1967); with Mollie Hardwick
- Alfred Deller: A Singularity of Voice (1968); with Mollie Hardwick
- Writers' Houses: A Literary Journey in England (1968); with Mollie Hardwick – US edition: A Literary Journey: Visits to the Homes of Great Writers
- Discovery of Japan (1969) – Hamlyn All Colour book
- The World's Greatest Air Mysteries (1970)
- As They Saw Him: Charles Dickens (1970) – "the great novelist as seen through the eyes of his family, friends, and contemporaries"
- Dickens' England: The Places in his Life and Works (1970); with Mollie Hardwick
- The Osprey Guide to Gilbert and Sullivan (1972)
- The Osprey Guide to Oscar Wilde (1973)
- The Osprey Guide to Jane Austen (1973)
- The Bernard Shaw Companion (1973); with Mollie Hardwick
- The Charles Dickens Encyclopedia (1973); with Mollie Hardwick
- A Literary Atlas and Gazetteer of the British Isles (1973)
- The Osprey Guide to Anthony Trollope (1974)
- The Charles Dickens Quiz Book (1974); with Mollie Hardwick
- Cars of the Thirties and Forties (1979)
- The Complete Guide to Sherlock Holmes (1986)
