= Sherlockiana =

Non-canonical works involving Sherlock Holmes

Sherlockiana encompasses various categories of materials and content related to the fictional detective Sherlock Holmes, created by Arthur Conan Doyle. The word "Sherlockiana" has been used for literary studies and scholarship concerning Sherlock Holmes, Sherlock Holmes pastiches in print and other media such as films, and memorabilia associated with Sherlock Holmes. Sherlockiana may be "anything about, inspired by, or tangentially concerning" Sherlock Holmes.

== Fiction ==
Non-canonical works of fiction featuring Sherlock Holmes, by creators other than Arthur Conan Doyle, have been referred to as examples of "Sherlockiana". Charles Spencer, former theatre critic for The Daily Telegraph, used the term to refer to the 2009–12 releases of the novel The House of Silk, the television series Sherlock, and two Sherlock Holmes films, Sherlock Holmes and its sequel Sherlock Holmes: A Game of Shadows, as representative of a "golden age of Sherlockiana."

== Literary studies ==
The cover of the 1979 printing of The Encyclopadeia Sherlockiana by Jack Tracy

When used to refer to literary studies, "Sherlockiana" includes essays and works about Sherlock Holmes such as Vincent Starrett's 1933 book The Private Life of Sherlock Holmes. Some of these studies concern the Sherlockian game, a pastime of attempting to resolve anomalies and clarify implied details about Holmes and Watson. The word is used in the title of The Encyclopaedia Sherlockiana, first published in 1977 and republished as The Ultimate Sherlock Holmes Encyclopedia in 1987, a reference text containing an exhaustive list of over 3,500 people, places, and things associated with the universe of Sherlock Holmes. The quarterly journal The Baker Street Journal is subtitled An Irregular Quarterly of Sherlockiana.

== Memorabilia ==
The term "Sherlockiana" has been used to refer to objects connected to Sherlock Holmes. Collections of Sherlockiana may include audio-visual recordings, books, magazines, newspaper clippings, art, clothing, advertising, stationery, and any other items associated with Holmes. The University of Minnesota contains the world's largest archive of Sherlockiana as of 2015, a large portion of which was bequeathed by American collector John Bennett Shaw upon his death in 1994.

== Monuments ==
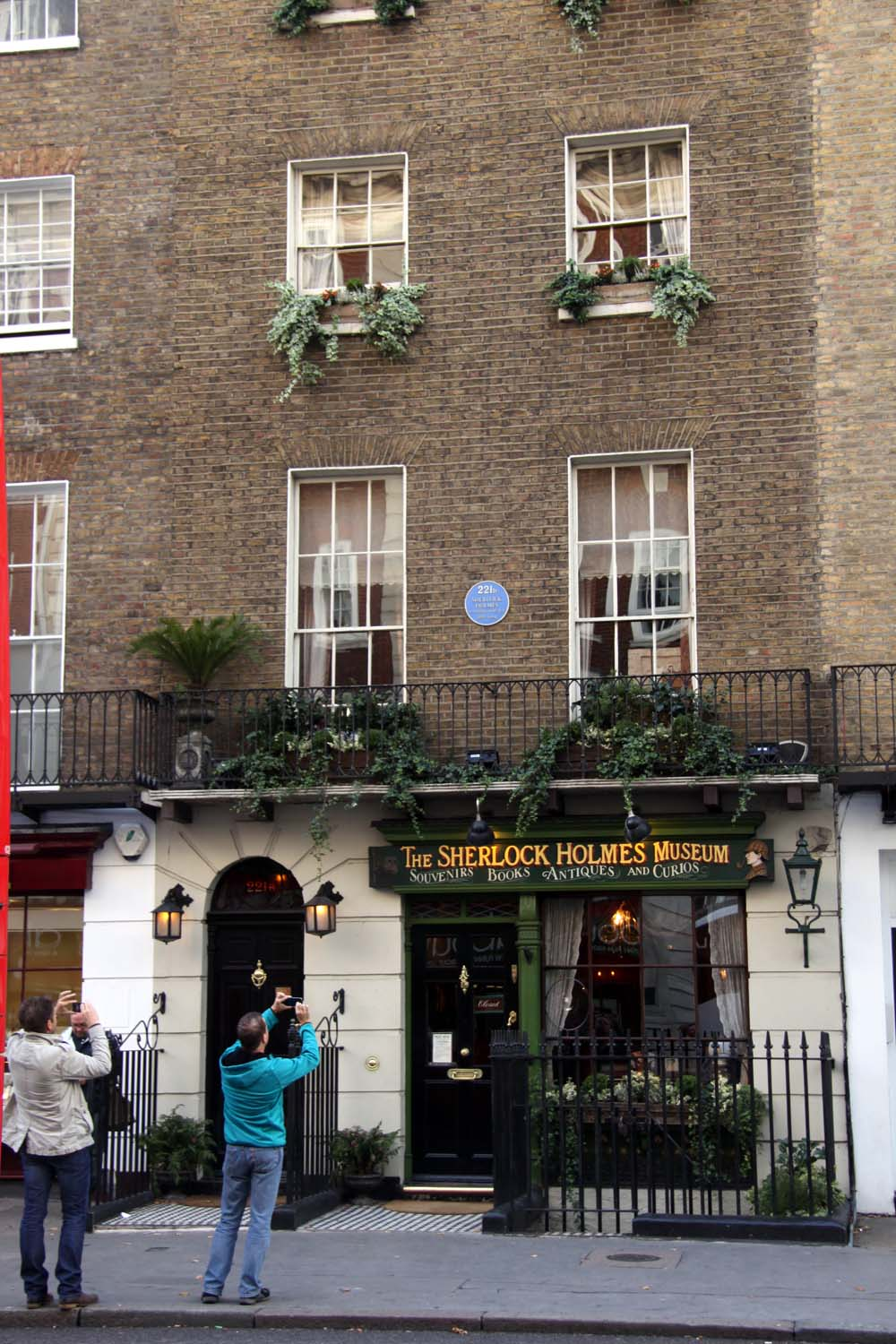
The Sherlock Holmes Museum in 2013

The interest in works about Sherlock Holmes has extended to intrigue by the United States Smithsonian Museums about the original location of 221B Baker Street. The investigation found that the supposed location of Holmes and Watson's flat did not exist during the early stories such as A Study in Scarlet. However, in 1990, the Sherlock Holmes International Society opened up the Sherlock Holmes Museum at 221B Baker Street. Furthermore, statues of Holmes displays "Sherlockian" culture as idolizing elements of the world.

Statues of Sherlock Holmes

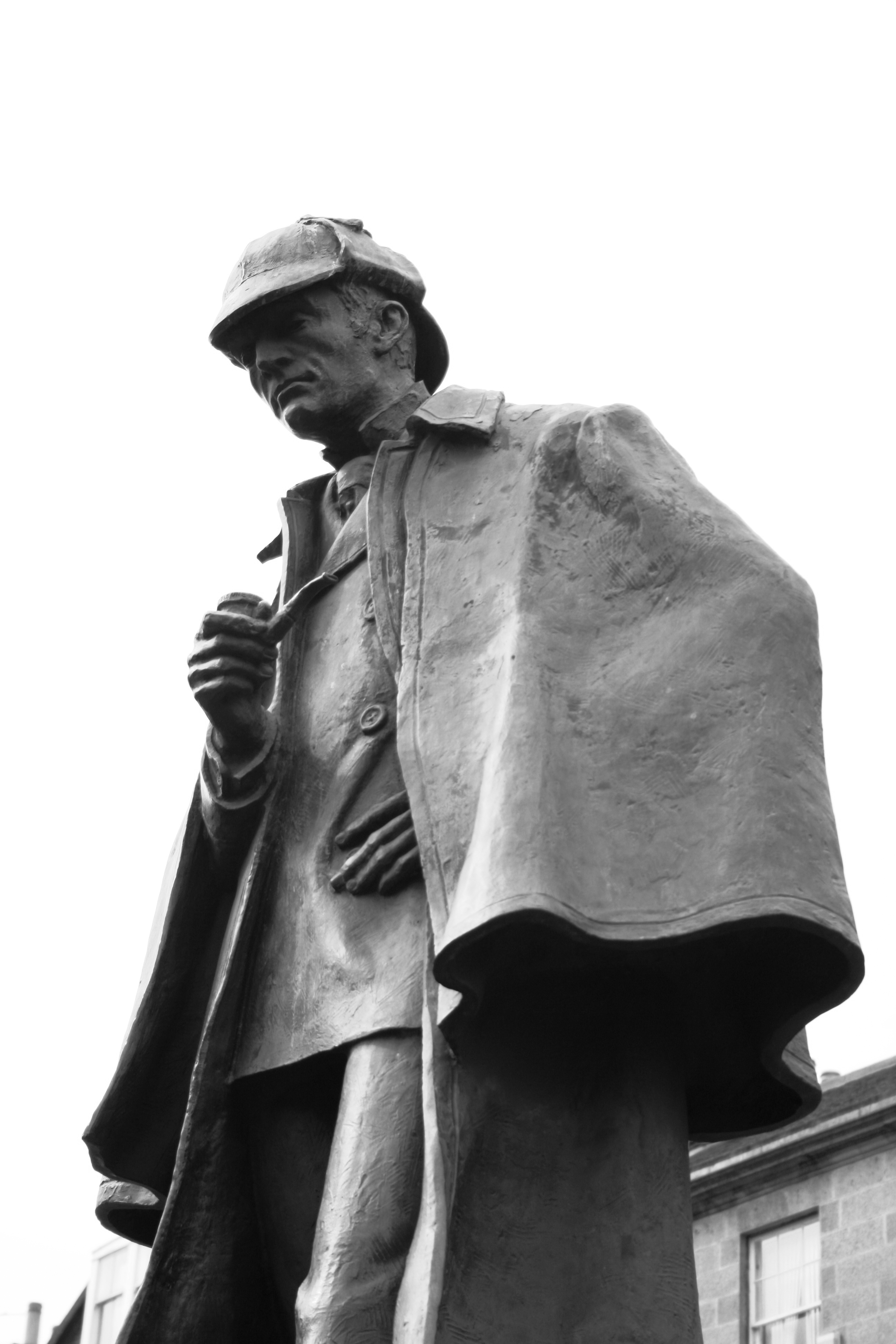
Edinburgh, Scotland

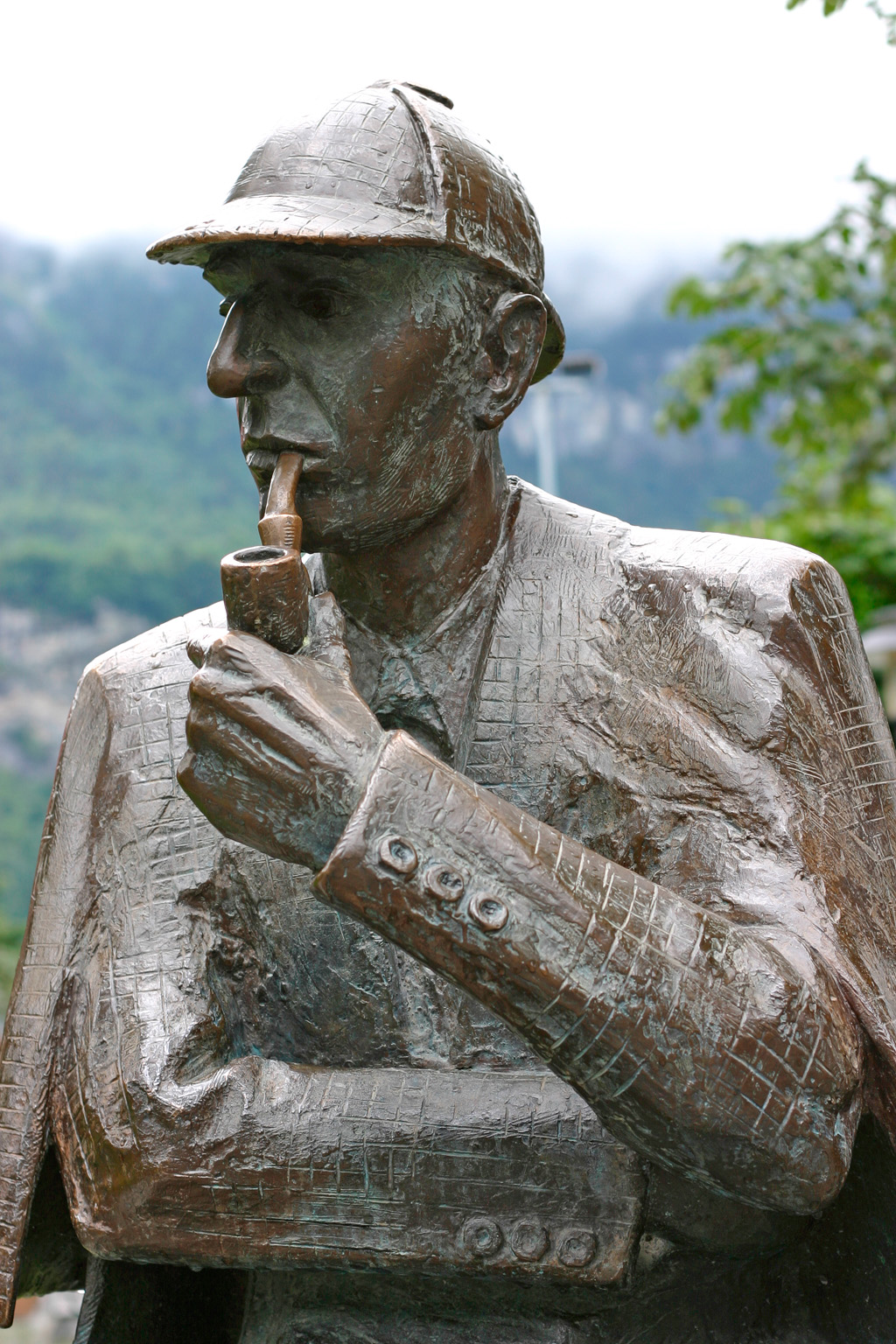
Meiringen, Switzerland

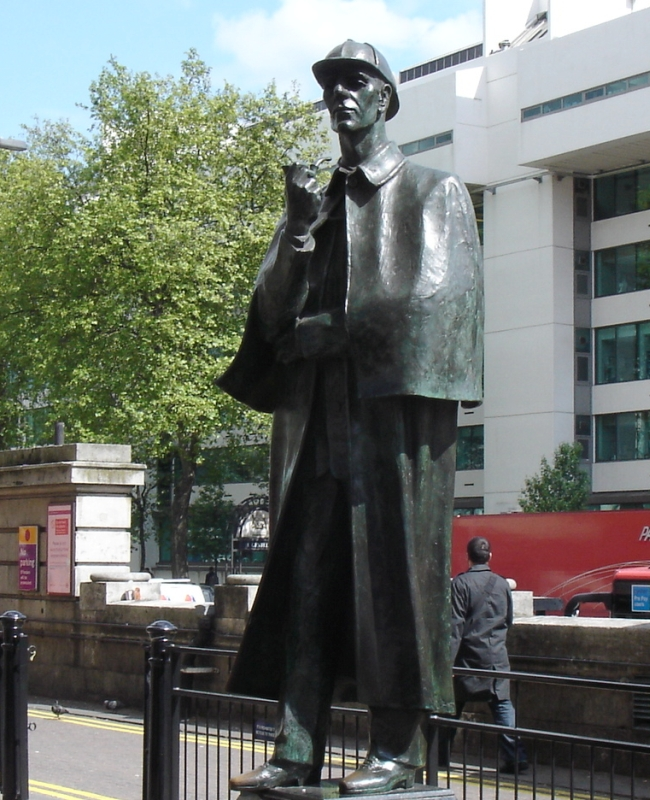
London, England
