= Guy Adams =

English author (born 1976)

- Born: 6 January 1976 (age 50); England
- Occupations: Novelist, actor, news agent, comedian
- Writing career
- Pen name: Gregory Ashe
- Genre: Fantasy
- Notable work: The World House

Guy Adams (born 6 January 1976) is an English author, comedian, and actor, possibly best known for the novel The World House. Adams is also a regular writer for Big Finish productions, who produce audio plays based on Doctor Who, as well as several other properties.

== Biography ==
Adams is based in Rochester, Kent, where he lives with writer A.K. Benedict. As well as The World House, he is best known for the Heaven’s Gate trilogy, the Clown Service series and the Deadbeat novels. He has also written the Torchwood novel, The House That Jack Built.

In audio drama, Adams has written extensively for Big Finish Productions, contributing to a wide range of titles within the Doctor Who franchise. He also adapted H. G. Wells’ The Shape of Things to Come, as well as creating the original horror series Blind Terror: The Gods of Frost.

In comics, Adams has written Rogue Trooper, Ulysses Sweet: Maniac for Hire and Max Normal for 2000 AD; with artist Jimmy Broxton, he co-created Goldtiger, conceived as a long-lost 1960s newspaper strip.

He played a mugger on British soap opera, Emmerdale and has also tried stand-up with his own material. Adams has also portrayed Sherlock Holmes before embarking on creating his own original novel featuring Holmes.

== Bibliography ==
=== Clown Service ===
- The Clown Service (2013)
- The Rain Soaked Bride (2014)
- A Few Words for the Dead (2015)

=== Doctor Who franchise ===
- Torchwood: The House that Jack Built (2009)
- Torchwood: The Men Who Sold the World (2011)
- Class: Joyride (2016)

=== Heaven's Gate ===
- The Good, The Bad, and The Infernal (2013)
- Once Upon a Time in Hell (2013)
- For a Few More Souls (2014)

=== Life on Mars franchise ===
- The Rules of Modern Policing (2007)
- The Wit and Wisdom of DCI Gene Hunt (2009)

=== Sherlock Holmes franchise ===
- The Case Notes of Sherlock Holmes (2009)
- Sherlock Holmes: The Breath of God (2012)
- Sherlock Holmes: The Army of Dr. Moreau (2013)

=== The Change ===
- London: Orbital (2017)
- New York: Queen of Coney Island (2017)
- Paris: City of Fools (2017)

=== The World House ===
- The World House (2010)
- The World House: Restoration (2011)

=== The Thirteenth Floor ===
- The Thirteenth Floor: The Return of Max (2023)
- The Thirteenth Floor Anthology (2026)

=== Standalone works ===
- Deadbeat Series

- Deadbeat: Makes You Stronger (2005)
- Deadbeat - Dogs of Waugh (2007)

- The Curse of the Werewolf (2009)
- Kronos (2011)
- Hands of the Ripper (2012)
- Countess Dracula (2013)
- Goldtiger (2016)
- Hope Series:

- Hope... For the Future (2018)
- Hope... Under Fire (2021)

=== Non-fiction ===
- Stranger Things: Notes from the Upside Down (2017)

== Audio plays ==
=== For Big Finish Productions ===
==== Doctor Who – Main Range ====
- Fiesta of the Damned
- Dalek Soul
- The Quantum Possibility Engine
- Conversion
- Dark Universe

==== Doctor Who – Novel Adaptations ====
- All-Consuming Fire (adapted from the novel by Andy Lane)

==== The Tenth Doctor Adventures ====
- Sword of the Chevalier

==== The Tenth Doctor Chronicles ====
- Last Chance

==== The First Doctor Adventures ====
- The Great White Hurricane
- Tick-Tock World
- For the Glory of Urth

==== The Third Doctor Adventures ====
- The Transcendence of Ephros
- The Rise of the New Humans
- The Scream of Ghosts
- Operation Hellfire

==== The Fourth Doctor Adventures ====
- Kill The Doctor!
- The Age of Sutekh
- The False Guardian
- Time's Assassin
- The World Traders
- The Dreams of Avarice
- Ice Heist!

==== The Eighth Doctor – The Time War ====
- In the Garden of Death

==== The War Doctor ====
- Pretty Lies

==== The War Master ====
- The Heavenly Paradigm
- The Persistence of Dreams
- Sins of the Father

==== The Diary of River Song ====
- The Unknown
- Peepshow

==== Torchwood ====
- More Than This
- Moving Target
- Made You Look
- Outbreak – Stage 1: Incubation:Know
- Believe
- We Always Get Out Alive
- Double - Part 1 & 2
- Widdershins

==== The Lives of Captain Jack ====
- The Year After I Died
- Month 25
- Crush

==== UNIT: The New Series ====
- Tidal Wave
- Retrieval
- Telepresence
- Code Silver
- The Power of River Song Part 1
- The Power of River Song Part 2

==== The New Adventures of Bernice Summerfield ====
- Random Ghosts
- The Pyramid of Sutekh
- Planet X
- The City and the Clock
- Truant
- Gallifrey

==== The New Counter-Measures ====
- Nothing to See Here

==== The Robots ====
- Circuit Breaker
- Closed Loop

==== The Companion Chronicles ====
- The Plague of Dreams
- The Crumbling Magician (from The First Doctor Volume 3)

==== Iris Wildthyme ====
- Iris Rides Out

==== Vienna ====
- Big Society
- Retribution

==== Blake's 7: The Liberator Chronicles ====
- Capital
- Punishment

==== Star Cops ====
- The Thousand Ton Bomb

==== Adam Adamant Lives! ====
- Vol.01: A Vintage Year for Scoundrels
- Vol.02: Face Off

==== The Confessions of Dorian Gray ====
- One Must Not Look at Mirrors

==== Big Finish Classics ====
- The Shape of Things to Come (based on the book by H. G. Wells)

==== Big Finish Originals ====
- Blind Terror: The Gods of Frost

== External resources ==
- REVIEW : The Clown Service at Upcoming4.me
- The story behind The Rain-Soaked Bride – Online Essay by Guy Adams at Upcoming4.me
