= The Private Life of Sherlock Holmes (book) =

1933 book by Vincent Starrett

- Title page for The Private Life of Sherlock Holmes (1933)
- Author: Vincent Starrett
- Language: English
- Genre: non-fiction
- Publisher: Macmillan Publishers
- Publication date: 1933
- Media type: Print (hardback & paperback)

The Private Life of Sherlock Holmes is a book by Vincent Starrett originally published in 1933. It is considered the first book on Sherlock Holmes scholarship, as well as a cornerstone of the study of Sherlockiana. It has been credited with jumpstarting the creation of Sherlockian Societies. It has been used as an inspiration and a reference for "biographies" of Sherlock Holmes such as Nick Rennison's 2005 Sherlock Holmes: The Unauthorized Biography.

The book was dedicated to William Gillette, Frederic Dorr Steele, and Gray Chandler Briggs.

The book was revised and expanded in 1960 and republished by The University of Chicago Press and again in 1993 by Otto Penzler Books. A paperback edition of the University of Chicago edition, with a new introduction and epilogue, was published by Pinnacle Books in 1975.
