= Dr. Jekyll and Mr. Holmes =

1979 Novel

- Author: Loren D. Estleman
- Language: English
- Genre: Mystery novels
- Publisher: Doubleday
- Publication date: 1979
- Media type: Print (hardback & paperback)
- ISBN: 0-385-15257-4 (hardcover)

Dr. Jekyll and Mr. Holmes is a Sherlock Holmes pastiche novel by Loren D. Estleman, originally published in 1979.

The novel is an account of Holmes' dealing with the mystery of Dr. Jekyll and Mr. Hyde as originally narrated in Robert Louis Stevenson's 1886 novella Strange Case of Dr Jekyll and Mr Hyde.

The book has since been republished in 2001 by I-Books and in 2010 Titan Books, the latter under their Further Adventures of Sherlock Holmes banner.

== Reception ==
Dread Central said "Estleman weaves Holmes into the story of Jekyll and Hyde very deftly. Without giving too much away, very few deviations from the overall plot of the Stevenson novel are made, while still providing the reader with an enjoyable Holmes adventure." The MYSTERY FANcier called the book "both nobly attempted and capably accomplished" but found that since the story hews so closely to Stevenson's original "there is no mystery involved in the matter at all. Watching Sherlock Holmes use his famed powers of deduction to untangle the tale of their twisted identities quickly becomes a matter of little more than idle intellectual curiosity." Kirkus Reviews found it uninspiring saying "though Estleman does a better, deadpan job of recreating Conan Doyle's Watson style than many, he forgets that, without mystery, there is no Holmes—and here, we know all along what Sherlock is trying to deduce."
