= Vincent Starrett =

American novelist (1886–1974)

- Born: October 26, 1886; Toronto, Ontario, Canada
- Died: January 5, 1974 (aged 87); Chicago, Illinois, United States
- Resting place: Graceland Cemetery
- Occupations: Newspaperman, writer
- Writing career
- Genres: Detective fiction, fantasy, horror

Charles Vincent Emerson Starrett (/ˈstærɪt/; October 26, 1886 – January 5, 1974), known as Vincent Starrett, was a Canadian-born American writer, newspaperman, and bibliophile.

== Biography ==
Charles Vincent Emerson Starrett was born above his grandfather's bookshop in Toronto, Ontario, Canada. His father moved the family to Chicago in 1889 where Starrett attended John Marshall High School.

Starrett landed a job as a cub reporter with the Chicago Inter-Ocean in 1905. When that paper folded two years later he began working for the Chicago Daily News as a crime reporter, a feature writer, and finally a war correspondent in Mexico from 1914 to 1915. Starrett turned to writing mystery and supernatural fiction for pulp magazines during the 1920s and 1930s.

In 1920, he wrote a Sherlock Holmes pastiche entitled The Adventure of the Unique "Hamlet". Starrett on at least one occasion said that the press-run was 100 copies, but on others claimed 200; a study of surviving copies by Randall Stock documents 110. This story involved the detective investigating a missing 1602 inscribed edition of Shakespeare's play Hamlet.

Starrett's most famous work, The Private Life of Sherlock Holmes, was published in 1933. Following that, Starrett wrote a book column, "Books Alive," for the Chicago Tribune. He retired after 25 years of the column in 1967. He often mentioned Sherlock Holmes in these columns, which appeared in the book section of the Sunday newspaper. These references were collected and annotated by Karen Murdock and published under the title "Sherlock Alive" in 2010. Starrett was one of the founders of The Hounds of the Baskerville (sic), a Chicago chapter of The Baker Street Irregulars.

Starrett's horror/fantasy stories were written primarily for the pulp magazine Weird Tales, and are collected in The Quick and the Dead, (Arkham House, 1965). His story "Penelope," published in the May 1923 issue of Weird Tales, was also featured in the anthology The Moon Terror (1927) anonymously edited by Farnsworth Wright, and published by the magazine.

Starrett's other writing included poetry, collected in Autolycus in Limbo, (Dutton, 1943), detective novels, such as Murder on 'B' Deck, (Doubleday, 1929, and others).

He had also created his own detective character, Chicago sleuth Jimmie Lavender, whose adventures usually first appeared in the pulp magazine Short Stories. The name Jimmy Lavender (sic) was that of an actual pitcher for the Chicago Cubs; Starrett wrote to ask the ball player for permission to use his name for a gentleman detective, which the pitcher granted. The stories are collected in The Case Book of Jimmie Lavender (Gold Label, 1944).

Starrett was a major enthusiast of Welsh writer Arthur Machen and was instrumental in bringing Machen's work to an American audience for the first time.

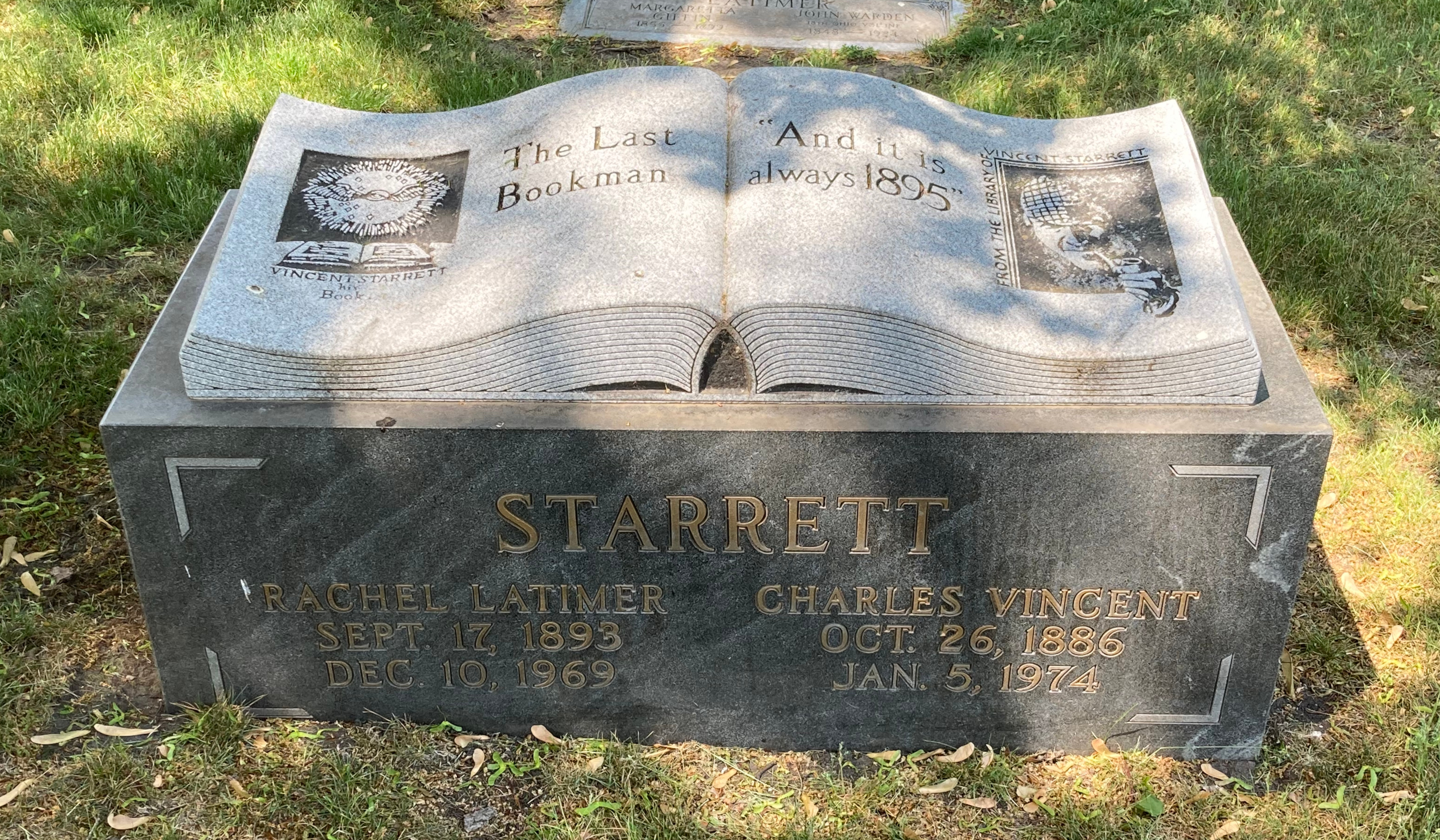
Starrett's grave at Graceland Cemetery

His influential weekly column "Books Alive" ran in the Chicago Tribune for 25 years. He also wrote Best Loved Books of the 20th Century, a collection of 52 essays discussing popular works, published in 1955.

He died in Chicago on January 5, 1974, and was buried at Graceland Cemetery next to his wife, Rachel Latimer Starrett.

A complete edition of Starrett's works is being published by George Vanderburgh's Battered Silicon Dispatch Box, a print-on-demand publisher, with 22 of a projected 25 volumes already in print. A publication in the Vincent Starrett Memorial Library is Sherlock Alive, compiled and edited by Karen Murdock, and first printed in August 2010. Sherlock Alive is a collection of the Sherlockian references from Starrett's "Books Alive" column.

== Film adaptations ==
Among his film adaptions his 1934 story "Recipe for Murder", first published in Redbook magazine in one installment, was filmed as The Great Hotel Murder by Fox in 1935.

== Bibliography ==
=== Walter Ghost mysteries ===
- Murder on 'B' Deck, The World's Work, 1929.
- Dead Man Inside, Doubleday, 1931.
- The End of Mr. Garment, Doubleday, 1932.

=== Others ===
- Buried Caesars: Essays in Literary Appreciation, Covici-McGee Company, 1923.
- Coffins for Two, Covici-McGee Company, 1924.
- Penny Wise and Book Foolish, Covici-Friede, 1929.
- The Private Life of Sherlock Holmes, Macmillan, 1933. A revised edition was published by The University of Chicago Press in 1960. A paperback edition was published in 1975 by Pinnacle Books and another paperback edition was published by Otto Penzler Books, 1993, ISBN 1-883402-05-0. (A movie called The Private Life of Sherlock Holmes had no connection to Vincent Starrett.)
- Books Alive, Random House, 1940.
- Bookman's Holiday: The Private Satisfactions of an Incurable Collector, Random House, 1942.
- Autolycus in Limbo, Dutton, 1943.
- The Case Book of Jimmie Lavender, Gold Label, 1944.
- Murder in Peking, The Lantern Press, 1946.
- Books and Bipeds, Argus Books, 1947.
- Book Column, The Caxton Club, 1958.
- Born in a Bookshop: Chapters from the Chicago Renascence, University of Oklahoma Press, 1965.
- The Quick and the Dead, Arkham House, 1965, OCLC 1855899
- The Further Adventures of Sherlock Holmes, Penguin Books, 1985, ISBN 0-14-007907-6

== See also ==
- Adrian Conan Doyle
