= The Veiled Detective =

2004 novel by David Stuart Davies

- First edition
- Author: David Stuart Davies
- Language: English
- Genre: Adventure, Mystery
- Published: 30 April 2004 (Robert Hale); 13 November 2009 (Titan Books)
- Publication place: United Kingdom
- Media type: Novel
- Pages: 224
- ISBN: 1848564902 (first edition)

The Veiled Detective is a 2004 mystery pastiche novel written by David Stuart Davies, that presents an alternate history of the life of Dr. John Watson and his relationship with Sherlock Holmes.

== Plot ==
John Watson is not named Watson, but rather Dr. John H. Walker. On his return to England, he is recruited by the criminal mastermind Professor James Moriarty to spy on the young but intellectually intimidating Sherlock Holmes. Walker agrees to take on the task, and taking on a new name, forms a lifelong acquaintance with Holmes that will test his resolve and his values.

== Reception ==
Abel Diaz for Blasting News enjoyed the first two-thirds of the book, but felt that it lost momentum in the end. "It may come up a bit short against other Sherlock classics, with a conclusion that didn't make the most of the book's premise, but the first two thirds and Davies' storytelling skills were so good I left satisfied."

== Reissues ==
Titan Books reprinted the book in 2009, under the title of The Further Adventures of Sherlock Holmes: The Veiled Detective as part of its Further Adventures series, which collects a number of noted pastiches.

== See also ==
- Sherlock Holmes pastiches
