= Bernard J. Schaffer =

American novelist

Bernard J. Schaffer (born 1974) is an American author and police detective.

== Reviews ==
Schaffer has received reviews for The Thief of All Light, An Unsettled Grave and Blood Angel.
