= The Prisoner of the Devil =

1979 novel by Michael Hardwick

- First edition
- Author: Michael Hardwick
- Language: English
- Genre: Mystery novels
- Publisher: Proteus
- Publication date: 1979
- Media type: Print (hardback & paperback)

The Prisoner of the Devil is a Sherlock Holmes pastiche novel by Michael Hardwick, originally published in 1979.

The acclaimed novel features Holmes called in to solve the case of the Dreyfus affair.

The book has since been republished in 1990 by Pinnacle Books and in 2018 by MeanTime Books.

== Reception ==
Michael Dirda reviewed the book for the Detroit Times and found himself "lukewarm" towards it. Publishers Weekly claimed the book was " enthusiastically endorsed by both the Baker Street Irregulars and the Conan Doyle estate."
