= Loren D. Estleman =

American writer

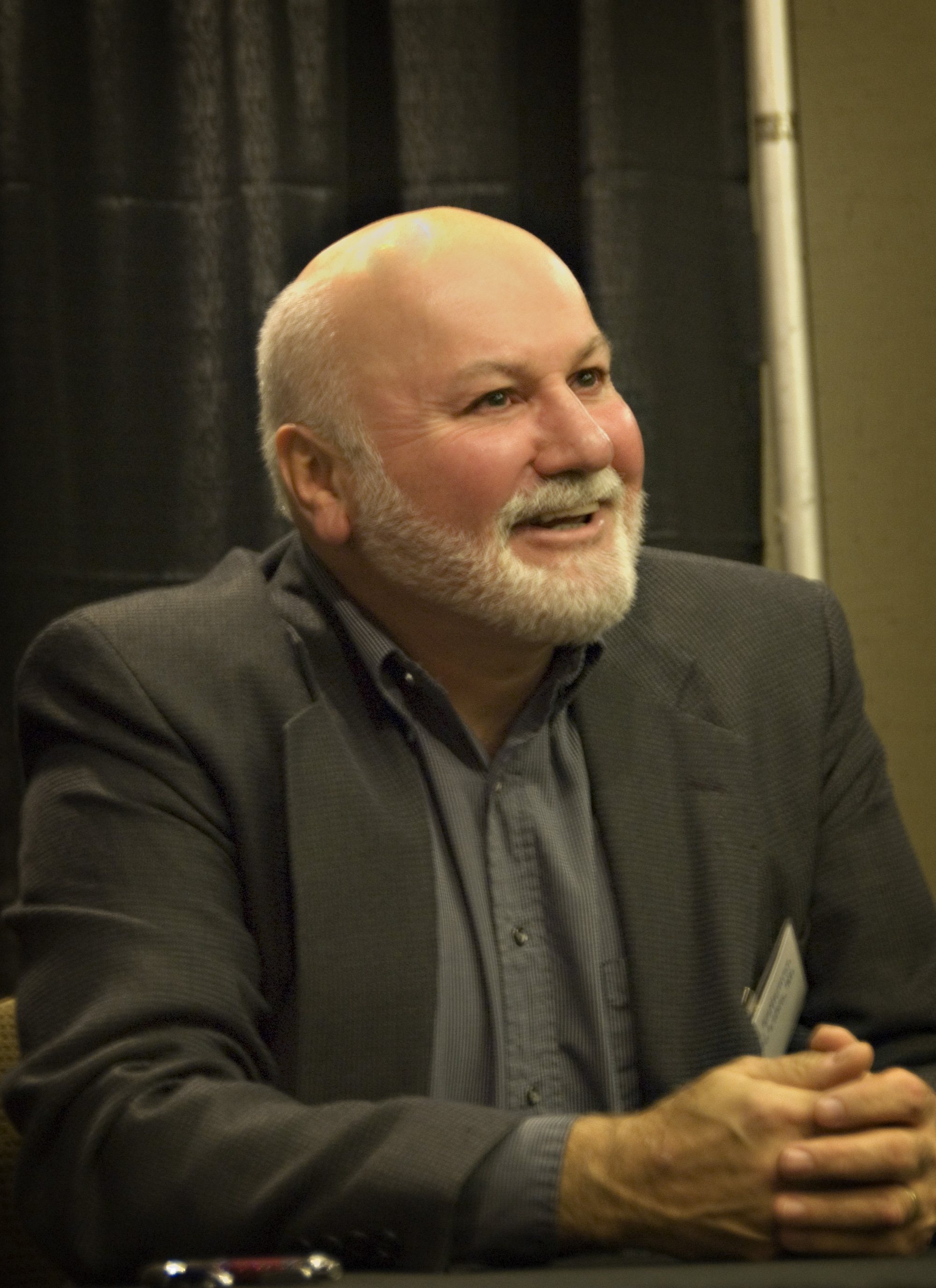
- Loren D. Estleman
- Born: September 15, 1952 (age 73); Ann Arbor, Michigan, U.S.
- Education: Eastern Michigan University (BA)
- Occupation: Novelist
- Spouse: Deborah Morgan (m. 1993)

Loren D. Estleman (born September 15, 1952, in Ann Arbor, Michigan) is an American writer of detective and Western fiction. He is known for a series of crime novels featuring the investigator Amos Walker.

== Life and work ==
Estleman graduated from Eastern Michigan University in 1974 with a BA in English and journalism. In 2002, Eastern Michigan University presented him with an honorary doctorate in humane letters. He married the mystery writer Deborah Morgan in 1993. He writes with a manual typewriter.

Estleman published his first novel, The Oklahoma Punk, in 1976, and published the first of his P.I. Amos Walker series, for which he is best known, in 1980. Other series center on Old West marshal Page Murdock and hitman Peter Macklin. He has also written a series of novels about the history of crime in Detroit (also the setting of his Walker books), and a more recent series about Valentino, who tracks down lost films, and crimes related to them. His non-series works include Bloody Season, a fictional recreation of the gunfight at the O.K. Corral, and several novels and stories featuring Sherlock Holmes, as well as contributions to several books on how to write and sell stories and novels. Estleman's literary works have been recognized and highlighted by Michigan State University in their Michigan Writers Series.

Estleman's Amos Walker stories occasionally acknowledge fellow Detroit P.I. Ben Perkins, created by Rob Kantner, and Kantner has done the same.

== Bibliography ==
=== Amos Walker novels ===
1. Motor City Blue (1980) ISBN 978-0-449-21133-5
2. Angel Eyes (1981) ISBN 978-0-395-31558-3
3. The Midnight Man (1982) ISBN 978-0-395-32204-8
4. The Glass Highway (1983) ISBN 978-0-395-34636-5
5. Sugartown (1985) ISBN 978-0-395-36449-9
6. Every Brilliant Eye (1986) ISBN 978-0-395-39428-1
7. Lady Yesterday (1987) ISBN 978-0-395-41072-1
8. Downriver (1988) ISBN 978-0-395-41073-8
9. Silent Thunder (1989) ISBN 978-0-395-41075-2
10. Sweet Women Lie (1990) ISBN 978-0-395-53767-1
11. Never Street (1997) ISBN 978-0-89296-633-2
12. The Witchfinder (1998) ISBN 978-0-89296-663-9
13. The Hours of the Virgin (1999) ISBN 978-0-89296-683-7
14. A Smile on the Face of the Tiger (2000) ISBN 978-0-89296-706-3
15. Sinister Heights (2002) ISBN 978-0-89296-738-4
16. Poison Blonde (2003) ISBN 978-0-7653-0447-6
17. Retro (2004) ISBN 978-0-7653-0448-3
18. Nicotine Kiss (2006) ISBN 978-0-7653-1223-5
19. American Detective (2007) ISBN 978-0-7653-1224-2
20. The Left-handed Dollar (2010) ISBN 978-0-7653-1954-8
21. Infernal Angels (2011) ISBN 978-0-7653-1955-5
22. Burning Midnight (2012) ISBN 978-0-7653-3120-5
23. Don't Look for Me (2014) ISBN 978-0-7653-3121-2
24. You Know Who Killed Me (2014) ISBN 978-0-7653-3735-1
25. The Sundown Speech (2015) ISBN 978-0-7653-3736-8
26. The Lioness Is the Hunter (2017) ISBN 978-0-7653-8845-2
27. Black and White Ball (2018) ISBN 978-0-7653-8847-6
28. When Old Midnight Comes Along (2019) ISBN 978-1-250-19717-7
29. Cutthroat Dogs (2021) ISBN 978-1-250-25865-6
30. Monkey in the Middle (2022) ISBN 978-1-250-82717-3
31. City Walls (2023) ISBN 978-1-250-82733-3
32. Smoke on the Water (2025)
33. Man One (2026)

==== Amos Walker short-story collections ====
- General Murders (1988) ISBN 978-0-395-41071-4
- Amos Walker: The Complete Story Collection (2010) ISBN 978-1-935562-24-5

=== Other books ===
==== Western novels ====
see also under Contributions to collections, below

- The Hider (1978) ISBN 978-0-385-13627-3
- Aces and Eights (1981) ISBN 978-0-385-17469-5
- The Wolfer (1981) ISBN 978-0-515-12704-1
- Mister St. John (1983) ISBN 978-0-385-18713-8
- This Old Bill (1984) ISBN 978-0-385-19165-4
- Gun Man (1985) ISBN 978-0-385-23067-4
- Bloody Season (1987) ISBN 978-0-553-05231-2
- The Best Western Stories of Loren D. Estleman (1989; selected by Bill Pronzini and Martin H. Greenberg) ISBN 978-0-8040-0911-9
- Sudden Country (1991) ISBN 978-0-385-24727-6
- Billy Gashade: An American Epic (1997) ISBN 978-0-312-85997-8
- Journey of the Dead (1998) ISBN 978-0-312-85999-2
- Black Powder, White Smoke (2002) ISBN 978-0-7653-0189-5
- The Undertaker's Wife (2005) ISBN 978-0-7653-0913-6
- The Adventures of Johnny Vermillion (2006) ISBN 978-0-7653-0914-3
- Roy & Lillie: A Love Story (2010) ISBN 978-0-7653-2228-9
- Ragtime Cowboys (2014) ISBN 978-0-7653-3454-1
- The Long High Noon (2015) ISBN 978-0-7653-3455-8
- The Ballad of Black Bart (2017) ISBN 978-0-7653-8353-2

==== Page Murdock ====
- The High Rocks (1979)
- Stamping Ground (1980) ISBN 978-0-385-15563-2
- Murdock's Law (1982) ISBN 978-0-385-17957-7
- The Stranglers (1984) ISBN 978-0-385-19326-9
- "The Angel of Santa Sofia" (1989, in The Best Western Stories of Loren D. Estleman)
- City of Widows (1995) ISBN 978-0-312-85667-0
- White Desert (2000) ISBN 978-0-312-86969-4
- Port Hazard (2004) ISBN 978-0-7653-0190-1
- The Book of Murdock (2010) ISBN 978-0-7653-1600-4
- Cape Hell (2016) ISBN 978-0-7653-8352-5
- Wild Justice (2018) ISBN 978-1-250-19709-2

==== Sherlock Holmes ====
see also under Contributions to collections, below

- Sherlock Holmes vs. Dracula; or, The Adventures of the Sanguinary Count (1978) ISBN 978-0-385-14051-5
- Dr. Jekyll and Mr. Holmes (1979) ISBN 978-0-385-15257-0
- The Perils of Sherlock Holmes (2012) ISBN 978-1-4405-4414-9

==== Peter Macklin ====
- Kill Zone (1984)
- Roses Are Dead (1985) ISBN 978-0-89296-136-8
- Any Man's Death (1986) ISBN 978-0-445-40266-9
- Something Borrowed, Something Black (2002) ISBN 978-0-312-87863-4
- Little Black Dress (2005) ISBN 978-0-7653-0894-8

==== The Detroit novels ====
The Detroit series sets out "to tell the story of America in the twentieth century through the microcosm of Detroit, the one city whose history mirrors precisely the history of the United States of America".

- Whiskey River (1990) ISBN 978-0-553-07042-2
- Motown (1991) ISBN 978-0-553-07421-5
- King of the Corner (1992) ISBN 978-0-553-08926-4
- Edsel (1995) ISBN 978-0-89296-552-6
- Stress (1996) ISBN 978-0-89296-553-3
- Jitterbug (1998) ISBN 978-0-312-86360-9
- Thunder City (1999) ISBN 978-0-312-86369-2

Given its historical fiction nature, the series is often given "in order of chronology rather than date of publication: Thunder City (1900–1910); Whiskey River (1928–1939); Jitterbug (1943); Edsel (1951–1959); Motown (1966); Stress (1973); and King of the Corner (1990)".

==== Valentino, film detective ====
- Frames: A Valentino Mystery (2008) ISBN 978-0-7653-1575-5
- Alone: A Valentino Mystery (2009) ISBN 978-0-7653-1576-2
- Valentino: Film Detective (Crippen & Landru, 2011; short stories) ISBN 978-1-932009-95-8
- Alive! A Valentino Mystery (2013) ISBN 978-0-7653-3331-5
- Shoot: A Valentino Mystery (2016) ISBN 978-0-7653-8045-6
- Brazen: A Valentino Mystery (2016) ISBN 978-0-7653-8046-3
- Indigo: A Valentino Mystery (2020) ISBN 978-1-250-25835-9
- Vamp: A Valentino Mystery (2023) ISBN 978-1-250-89247-8

==== Other ====
- The Oklahoma Punk (1976; AKA Red Highway) ISBN 978-0-7862-2180-6
- Peeper (1989; Ralph Poteet) ISBN 978-0-553-05363-0
- People Who Kill (1993; short story)
- The Rocky Mountain Moving Picture Association (1999; historical) ISBN 978-0-312-86676-1
- The Master Executioner (2001) ISBN 978-0-312-86970-0
- Gas City (2008) ISBN 978-1-4001-0620-2
- The Branch and the Scaffold: A Novel of Judge Parker (2009) ISBN 978-0-7653-1599-1
- The Confessions of Al Capone (2013) ISBN 978-0-7653-3119-9
- The Eagle and the Viper (2021) ISBN 978-1-250-25862-5
- Paperback Jack (2022) ISBN 978-1-250-82731-9

=== Story collections ===
- Detroit Is Our Beat: Tales of the Four Horsemen (2015; short story collection) ISBN 978-1-4405-8844-0
- Nearly Nero (2017; short story collection) ISBN 978-1-5072-0327-9
- Desperate Detroit: And Stories of Other Dire Places (2016) ISBN 978-1-4405-9620-9

=== Contributions to collections ===
Estleman's short stories have been collected in a variety of anthologies, including both western and crime collections:

- "Bloody July" in The New Black Mask Quarterly, number 1 (1985, edited by Matthew J. Bruccoli & Richard Layman)
- "I'm in the Book" in Mean Streets: Volume 2: The Second Private Eye Writers of America Anthology (1986, edited by Robert J. Randisi)
- "The Used" in The Black Lizard Anthology of Crime Fiction (1987, edited by Edward Gorman) ISBN 978-0-88739-039-5
- "The Tree on Execution Hill" in Uncollected Crimes (1987, edited by Bill Pronzini and Martin H. Greenberg) ISBN 978-0-8027-0967-7
  - "The Tree on Execution Hill" also appeared in Opening Shots: Great Mystery and Crime Writers Share Their First Published Stories (2000, edited by Lawrence Block)
- "Blond and Blue" in Homicidal Acts #4 (1988, edited by Bill Pronzini and Martin H. Greenberg)
- "Gun Music" in Raymond Chandler's Philip Marlowe: A Centennial Celebration (1988, edited by Byron Preiss) ISBN 978-0-394-57327-4
- "Mago's Bride" in Westeryear: Stories About the West, Past and Present (1988, edited by Edward Gorman) ISBN 978-0-87131-553-3
- "Dead Soldier" in City Sleuths and Tough Guys (1989, edited by David Willis McCullough) ISBN 978-0-395-51318-7
- "Hell on the Draw" in The New Frontier: The Best of Today's Western Fiction (1989, edited by Joe R. Lansdale) ISBN 978-0-385-24569-2
  - "Hell on the Draw" also appeared in The Western Hall of Fame Anthology (1997, edited by Dale L. Walker, ISBN 978-0-425-15906-4) and A Century of Great Western Stories (2000, edited by John Jakes, ISBN 978-0-312-86986-1)
- "The Death of Dutch Creel" in Christmas out West (1990, edited by Bill Pronzini and Martin H. Greenberg) ISBN 978-0-385-41561-3
- "The Crooked Way" in P.I. Files (1990, edited by Estleman and Martin H. Greenberg) ISBN 978-0-8041-0555-2
- "I, Monster" in The Ultimate Frankenstein (1991, edited by Byron Preiss) ISBN 978-0-440-50352-1
- "Slipstream" in Deadly Allies II: Private Eye Writers of America and Sisters in Crime Collaborative Anthology (1994, edited by Robert J. Randisi and Susan Dunlap) ISBN 978-0-385-42468-4
- "The Hack" in Deals with the Devil (1994, edited by Mike Resnick, Martin H. Greenberg, and Estleman) ISBN 978-0-88677-623-7
- "The Bandit" in Great Stories of the American West (1994, edited by Martin H. Greenberg) ISBN 978-1-55611-417-5
- "Iron Heart's Story" in New Trails: Twenty-Three Original Stories of the West from Western Writers of America (1994, edited by John Jakes and Martin H. Greenberg) ISBN 978-0-385-46990-6
- "Gun Man" in Frontier Legends (1995)
- "Greektown" in A Century of Mystery, 1980-1989: The Greatest Stories of the Decade (1996, edited by Marcia Muller and Bill Pronzini)
- "Robbers' roost" in First Cases: First Appearances of Classic Private Eyes (1996, edited by Robert J. Randisi) ISBN 978-0-525-94104-0
- "The Adventure of the Three Ghosts" in Holmes for the Holidays (1996, edited by Martin H. Greenberg, Jon L. Lellenberg, and Carol-Lynn Waugh) ISBN 978-0-425-15473-1
- "Web of Books" in Senior Sleuths (1996, edited by Cynthia Manson and Constance Scarborough) ISBN 978-0-425-15258-4
- "The Alchemist" in The Best of the American West: Outstanding Frontier Fiction (1998, edited by Ed Gorman and Martin H. Greenberg) ISBN 978-0-425-16508-9
- "Redneck" in The Best American Mystery Stories, 1999 (1999, edited by Ed McBain)
- "The Pilgrim" in The Best of the American West II: Frontier Adventure (1999, edited by Ed Gorman and Martin H. Greenberg) ISBN 978-0-425-17145-5
- "Dr. and Mrs. Watson at Home" in The New Adventures of Sherlock Holmes: Original Stories (1999, edited by Martin H. Greenberg, Jon L. Lellenberg, and Carol-Lynn Rössel Waugh) ISBN 978-0-7867-0698-3
- "The Adventure of the Greatest Gift" in More Holmes for the Holidays (1999, edited by Martin H. Greenberg, Jon L. Lellenberg, and Carol-Lynn Waugh) ISBN 978-0-4251-7033-5
- "Cat King of Cochise County" in Tales of the American West: The Best of Spur Award-Winning Authors (2000, edited by Richard S. Wheeler) ISBN 978-0-451-20030-3
- "The Man in the White Hat" in The World's Finest Mystery and Crime Stories: First Annual Collection (2000, edited by Ed Gorman)
- "Thirteen Coils" in American West: Twenty New Stories from the Western Writers of America (2001, edited by Estleman) ISBN 978-0-312-87317-2
- "South Georgia Crossing" in The Blue and the Gray Undercover: All New Civil War Spy Adventures (2001, edited by Ed Gorman) ISBN 978-0-312-87487-2
- "The Adventure of the Arabian Knight" in Murder in Baker Street: New Tales of Sherlock Holmes (2001, edited by Martin H. Greenberg, Jon L. Lellenberg, Daniel Stashower)
- "Used" in A Century of Noir: Thirty-Two Classic Crime Stories (2002, edited by Mickey Spillane and Max Allan Collins) ISBN 978-0-451-20596-4
- "Evil Grows" in Mystery: The Best of 2001 (2002, edited by Jon L. Breen)
- "Lady on Ice" in A Hot and Sultry Night for Crime (2003, edited by Jeffery Deaver) ISBN 978-0-425-18839-2
  - "Lady on Ice" also appears in The Shamus Winners: America's Best Private Eye Stories. Volume II, 1996-2009 (2010, collected and introduced by Robert J. Randisi) ISBN 978-0-9825157-6-1
- "Riddle of the Golden Monkeys" in Murder, My Dear Watson: New Tales of Sherlock Holmes (2003, edited by Martin H. Greenberg, Jon Lellenberg, Daniel Stashower) ISBN 978-0-7867-1081-2
- "Hangman's Choice" in Stagecoach (2003, edited by Ed Gorman and Martin H. Greenberg) ISBN 978-0-425-19205-4
- "Bog" in Wild Crimes: Stories of Mystery in the Wild (2004, edited by Dana Stabenow)
- "The Devil and Sherlock Holmes" in Ghosts in Baker Street (2006, edited by Martin H. Greenberg, Jon Lellenberg and Daniel Stashower) ISBN 978-0-7867-1400-1
- "Kill the Cat" in Detroit Noir (2007, edited by E.J. Olsen & John C. Hocking) ISBN 978-1-933354-39-2
- "Mark and Bill" in Lost Trails (2007, edited by Martin H. Greenberg and Russell Davis) ISBN 978-0-7860-1824-6
- "Smart Aleck" in At the Scene of the Crime: Forensic Mysteries from Today's Best Writers (2008, edited by Dana Stabenow) ISBN 978-0-7867-2055-2
- "The Profane Angel" in A Prisoner of Memory: And 24 of the Year's Finest Crime and Mystery Stories (2008, edited by Ed Gorman & Martin H. Greenberg)
- "Adventure of the Coughing Dentist" in Sherlock Holmes in America (2009, edited by Martin H. Greenberg, Jon L. Lellenberg, and Daniel Stashower) ISBN 978-1-60239-352-3
- "Long High Noon" in Law of the Gun (2010, edited by Martin H. Greenberg and Russell Davis) ISBN 978-0-7860-1957-1
- "Curve" in More Stories from the Twilight Zone (2010, edited by Carol Serling) ISBN 978-0-7653-2581-5
- "Sometimes a Hyena" in The Best American Mystery Stories: 2011 (2011, edited by Harlan Coben)
- "The List" in The Interrogator: And Other Criminally Good Fiction (2012, edited by Ed Gorman and Martin H. Greenberg)

=== Non-fiction ===
- "Method for Murder" in Writing Mystery and Crime Fiction (1985, edited by Sylvia K. Burack) ISBN 978-0-87116-141-3
- Introduction to Bantam's two-volume Sherlock Holmes: The Complete Novels and Stories (1986)
- Introduction to Bantam Crimeline's reprint of Rex Stout's Fer-de-Lance, ISBN 0-553-27819-3 (1992)
- "Owen Wister" in Nineteenth-century American Western Writers (1997, Dictionary of Literary Biography v. 186, edited by Robert L. Gale) ISBN 978-0-7876-1682-3
- "And the Murderer Is ..." in Writing the Private Eye Novel: A Handbook by the Private Eye Writers of America (1997) ISBN 978-0-89879-767-1
- "Twilight for High Noon: Today's Western" in The Writer's Handbook (1999, edited by Sylvia K. Burack)
- "Perspectives on Point of View" in Writing Mysteries: A Handbook by the Mystery Writers of America (2002, edited by Sue Grafton with Jan Burke and Barry Zeman) ISBN 978-1-58297-102-5
- Introduction to Lee Silva's Wyatt Earp: A Biography of the Legend (2002) ISBN 978-0-9714719-0-0
- Writing the Popular Novel: A Comprehensive Guide to Crafting Fiction that Sells (2004) ISBN 978-1-58297-287-9
- Amos Walker's Detroit (2007; photographs by Monte Nagler) ISBN 978-0-8143-3357-0
- Introduction to Jory Sherman's Shadows of Yesteryear: Western Short Stories (2010)
- The Wister Trace: Assaying Classing Western Fiction University (2014) ISBN 978-0-8061-4481-8 (2nd ed.)

== Awards ==
Estleman has won many awards for his writing including American Mystery Awards, Golden Spurs, and three Western Heritage Awards. He has been honored by the Michigan Foundation of the Arts and the Michigan Library Association.

=== Wins ===
- 1985 Shamus Award, Best Private Eye Novel, Sugartown
- 1986 Shamus Award, Best Private Eye Short Story, "Eight Mile and Dequindre"
- 1989 Shamus Award, Best Private Eye Short Story, "The Crooked Way"
- 2004 Shamus Award, Best Private Eye Short Story, "Lady on Ice"

=== Nominations ===
- 1983 Shamus Award, Best Private Eye Short Story, "Dead Soldier"
- 1984 Shamus Award, Best Private Eye Novel, The Glass Highway
- 1984 Shamus Award, Best Private Eye Short Story, "Greektown"
- 1986 Anthony award, Best Short Story, "Eight Mile and Dequindre"
- 1987 Shamus Award, Best Private Eye Short Story, "I'm in the Book"
- 1988 Shamus Award, Best Private Eye Novel, Lady Yesterday
- 1988 Shamus Award, Best Private Eye Short Story, "Bodyguards Shoot Second"
- 1991 Edgar Award, Best Mystery Novel, Whiskey River
- 1991 Shamus Award, Best Private Eye Short Story, "Cigarette Stop"
- 1992 Shamus Award, Best Private Eye Short Story, "The Man Who Loved Noir"
- 1993 Shamus Award, Best Private Eye Short Story, "Safe House"
- 1995 Shamus Award, Best Private Eye Short Story, "Slipstream"
- 2001 Shamus Award, Best Private Eye Novel, A Smile on the Face of the Tiger
- 2007 Shamus Award, Best Private Eye Short Story, "Square One"
- 2008 Shamus Award, Best Private Eye Short Story, "Kill the Cat"
- 2008 Shamus Award, Best Private Eye Short Story, "Trust Me"
