= Sherlock Holmes: The Breath of God =

2011 novel by Guy Adams

- Author: Guy Adams
- Language: English
- Genre: Mystery novels
- Publisher: Titan Books
- Publication date: 2011
- Media type: Print (Paperback)
- ISBN: 978-0-85768-282-6 (first U.S. edition, paperback)

Sherlock Holmes: The Breath of God is a Sherlock Holmes pastiche novel by Guy Adams, originally published in 2011.

The novel is an account of a mystery involving the supernatural deaths of people. In the course of his investigation, Holmes meets Aleister Crowley and William Hope Hodgson's supernatural detective Thomas Carnacki.

== Reception ==
Peter Coleborn writing for the British Fantasy Society called it "well written, engrossing and effective". The Daily Rotation claimed "the book has a crisp wit, high adventure, knowing nods to literary fans, and a well plotted mystery".

Publishers Weekly, however, was more mixed saying "Holmes's hyper-rationalism never gels with the decidedly otherworldly plot line, though Adams does a better-than-average job in portraying him and Watson".
