= Dust and Shadow =

2009 Sherlock Holmes book by Lyndsay Faye

Dust and Shadow: An Account of the Ripper Killings by Dr. John H. Watson
- Author: Lyndsay Faye
- Genre: Mystery novels
- Publisher: Simon & Schuster
- Publication date: 2009
- Media type: Print (Hardback)
- ISBN: 1-4165-8330-0 (first edition, hardback)

Dust and Shadow: An Account of the Ripper Killings by Dr. John H. Watson is a Sherlock Holmes pastiche novel by Lyndsay Faye which pits Sherlock Holmes against Jack the Ripper.

The book is Faye's first novel and it has the blessing of Conan Doyle's heirs.

== Title ==
The book takes its name from Horace's epigram, "We are but dust and shadow" (Pulvis et umbra sumus), which Holmes quotes in the novel.

== Summary ==
In a foreword, writing in 1939, the elderly Dr. Watson decides to leave his manuscript account of the Ripper killings to his estate for publication after his death. The account was confidential until then, but Watson feels it's important that the facts be known, since the deceased Sherlock Holmes, for once in his life, was wrong when he predicted that "the world has already forgotten [the Ripper]."

Holmes and Watson are called to the countryside by Inspector Gregson to look into the disappearance of a valuable ring from the home of a Baron's family. The "solution" is unsatisfactory: Holmes deduces that the Baron himself stole the ring, having already pawned several items of value to pay for his brother's gambling debts, and even being forced to rob the grave of his prematurely deceased wife. When confronted, the Baron surrenders the ring, then kills himself in shame. Holmes claims to Gregson that the case is unsolvable while planning to return the ring anonymously in the mail, but is nonplussed when one of Gregson's young constables points out clues that Holmes himself took pains to conceal from Gregson. Returning to Baker Street, Holmes receives an anonymous threatening note.

A few months later, Watson is horrified by the news of Mary Ann Nichols's murder and mutilation, but Holmes dismisses it as an isolated incident. However, when Annie Chapman is murdered similarly, and Inspector Lestrade asks for help, Holmes is forced to notice the similarities between the two killings and predicts that more will follow if the killer is not stopped. Investigating the murder scenes in Whitechapel, Holmes and Watson meet Mary Ann Monk, a casual friend of Mary Nichols, who agrees to spy on their behalf. After a few nights, she excitedly claims to have identified the killer from tavern gossip as a soldier named Johnny Blackstone, on leave from his regiment.

Despite their efforts, Holmes, Watson, and the police are unable to prevent the murders of Elizabeth Stride and Catherine Eddowes. Holmes interrupts the killer in the process of murdering Stride and suffers a near-fatal stab wound without being able to catch the man. Worse, newspaper stories suggest that Holmes himself is the killer, based on his proximity to each of the murder scenes. Holmes also receives another anonymous note from the killer, identifying himself as "Jack the Ripper."

Patient investigation leads Holmes to an elementary solution that horrifies Watson, Monk, and Lestrade: the Ripper is a policeman, Constable Edward Bennett, able to escape the scenes of his crimes by re-donning his uniform and able to anonymously supply the newspapers with credible tips about Holmes's whereabouts and activities that make him look guilty. The Ripper decided it was vitally important to neutralize Holmes as a threat to him, but by going to such lengths, he inadvertently revealed his own identity.

Despite this breakthrough, Holmes and Watson's stakeout only leads them to the site of Mary Jane Kelly's murder, with no clues as to Bennett's current whereabouts. They return home demoralized but receive a lucky break when Bennett's newspaper contact arrives on their doorstep in a panic, admitting that he followed Bennett to his current hideout, seeing gruesome relics that confirm he is the Ripper.

Holmes and Watson lie in wait at the hideout, actually the run-down home of Bennett's mother, who is blind and semi-deranged (from her ramblings, Holmes and Watson guess that Edward's madness resulted from his abusive father and that Edward turned on his father and killed him when Edward was still a child). Realizing Bennett has left a kerosene fire burning in the basement, Holmes and Watson hustle Mrs. Bennett out of the house just before it explodes. Realizing from Mrs. Bennett that Edward's latest victim is being held upstairs, Holmes re-enters the home and rescues Miss Monk, drugged into a stupor but still alive. Injured and disoriented, they are confronted by Bennett, who charges at them. Watson draws his revolver and shoots Bennett dead, before passing out.

The Home Secretary and Sherlock's brother Mycroft, fearing a total breakdown of public order if the truth becomes known, order Lestrade to cover up the Ripper's identity and keep the official investigation open, indefinitely. However, Lestrade privately confirms to the rest of Scotland Yard that the case is solved. Knowing that they can never publicly acknowledge Holmes's role in stopping the killings, Lestrade and the detective force privately gift him with a commemorative cigarette case to replace the one the Ripper took as a trophy. Holmes is warmed by this heartfelt praise from law enforcement professionals more than he ever could be by any official accolades.

== Reception ==
Reviews of Dust and Shadow: An Account of the Ripper Killings by Dr. John H Watson have been largely positive.

Tim Rutton, writing for the Los Angeles Times, stated "she gets the critical component – Watson's voice – right."

Caleb Carr, who himself penned a Sherlock Holmes pastiche entitled The Italian Secretary, remarked "Where others have failed, Lyndsay Faye's extremely impressive debut novel succeeds, on every level, providing thrilling entertainment without blatant exploitation."

The Chicago Center for Literature and Photography gave the novel an 8.9 out of 10.

== See also ==
- Sherlock Holmes Versus Jack the Ripper, Frogware adventure game
