= Mycroft =

Mycroft may refer to:

== Fictional entities ==
- Mycroft Holmes, Sherlock Holmes' brother in Arthur Conan Doyle's detective novels
- Mycroft Holmes (novel), a 2015 novel by Kareem Abdul-Jabbar and Anna Waterhouse
- Mycroft Holmes, a computer in Robert A. Heinlein's 1966 novel The Moon Is a Harsh Mistress
- Mycroft Mixeudeim, main character in the play The Charge of the Expormidable Moose by Claude Gauvreau

== Computing ==
- Mycroft project, a collection of search plugins for web browsers
- Mycroft (software), an open source intelligent personal assistant inspired by Robert A. Heinlein's 1966 novel The Moon Is a Harsh Mistress

== People ==
- Alan Mycroft, co-creator of the Norcroft C compiler
- Frank Mycroft (1873–1900), an English cricketer who played for Derbyshire between 1893 and 1895
- Michaela Mycroft (born 1994), South African activist
- Thomas Mycroft (1848–1911), English cricketer
- William Mycroft (1841–1894), English cricketer
- Ian Gillies (1927–2002), known as Mycroft on the BBC Radio 4 quiz series Brain of Britain that he presented

== See also ==
- Mycroft Next, a character from Jasper Fforde's Thursday Next series of books
- Mycroft & Moran, an imprint of Arkham House publishers
