= Kareem Abdul-Jabbar =

American basketball player (born 1947)

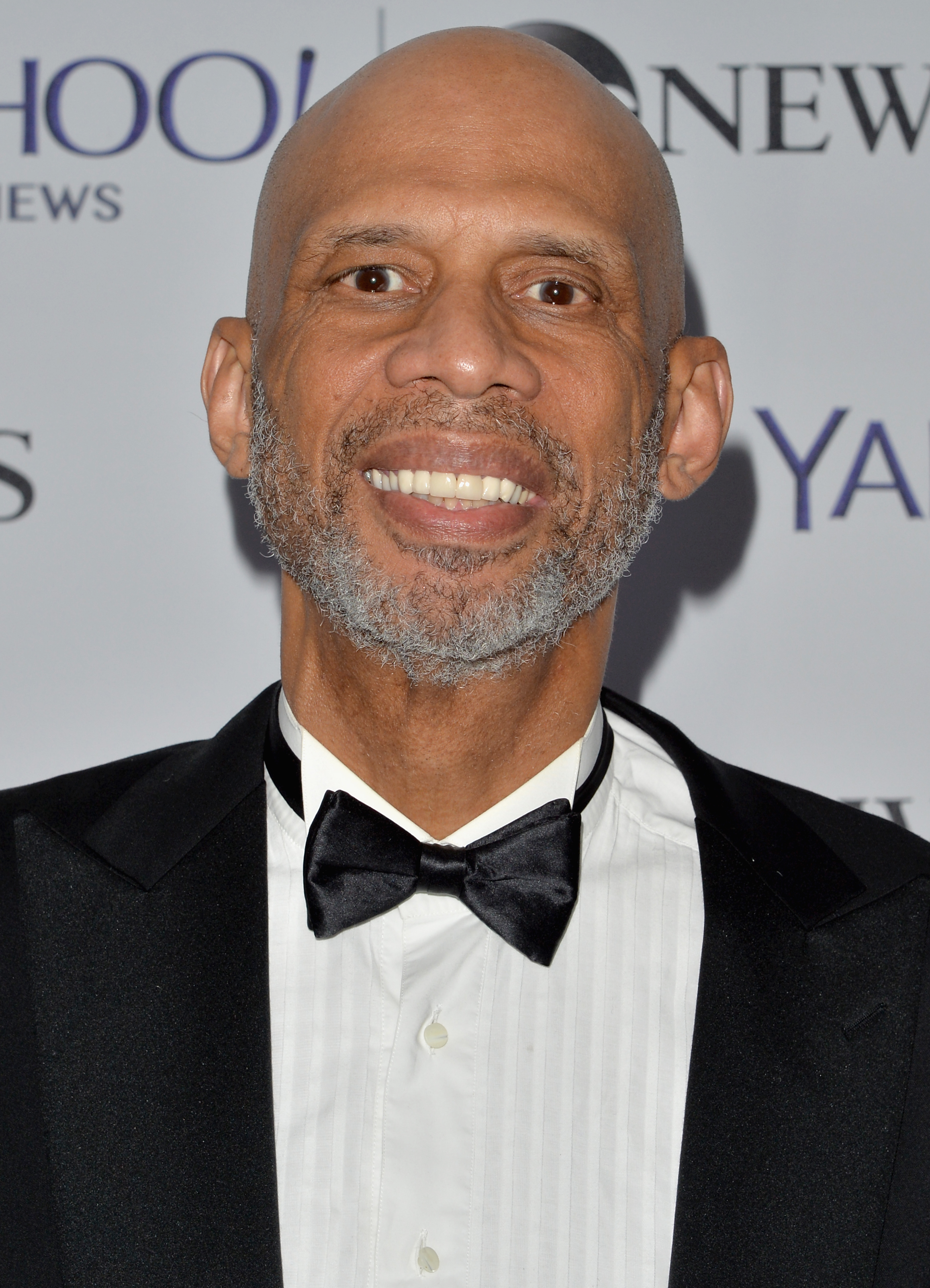
- Abdul-Jabbar in 2014

Personal information
- Born: April 16, 1947 (age 79) New York City, New York, U.S.
- Listed height: 7 ft 2 in (2.18 m)
- Listed weight: 225 lb (102 kg)

Career information
- High school: Power Memorial (New York City, New York)
- College: UCLA (1966–1969)
- NBA draft: 1969: 1st round, 1st overall pick
- Drafted by: Milwaukee Bucks
- Playing career: 1969–1989
- Position: Center
- Number: 33
- Coaching career: 1998–2011

Career history

Playing
- 1969–1975: Milwaukee Bucks
- 1975–1989: Los Angeles Lakers

Coaching
- 1998–1999: Alchesay HS (assistant)
- 2000: Los Angeles Clippers (assistant)
- 2002: Oklahoma Storm
- 2005–2011: Los Angeles Lakers (assistant)

Career highlights
- 6× NBA champion (1971, 1980, 1982, 1985, 1987, 1988); 2× NBA Finals MVP (1971, 1985); 6× NBA Most Valuable Player (1971, 1972, 1974, 1976, 1977, 1980); 19× NBA All-Star (1970–1977, 1979–1989); 10× All-NBA First Team (1971–1974, 1976, 1977, 1980, 1981, 1984, 1986); 5× All-NBA Second Team (1970, 1978, 1979, 1983, 1985); 5× NBA All-Defensive First Team (1974, 1975, 1979–1981); 6× NBA All-Defensive Second Team (1970, 1971, 1976–1978, 1984); NBA Rookie of the Year (1970); NBA All-Rookie First Team (1970); 2× NBA scoring champion (1971, 1972); NBA rebounding leader (1976); 4× NBA blocks leader (1975, 1976, 1979, 1980); NBA anniversary teams (35th, 50th, 75th); No. 33 retired by Milwaukee Bucks; No. 33 retired by Los Angeles Lakers; Sports Illustrated Sportsperson of the Year (1985); 3× NCAA champion (1967–1969); 3× NCAA Final Four Most Outstanding Player (1967–1969); 3× National college player of the year (1967–1969); 3× Consensus first-team All-American (1967–1969); 3× First-team All-Pac-8 (1967–1969) (Note: UCLA played the 1966–67 and 1967–68 seasons in the Athletic Association of Western Universities (AAWU) conference, which expanded and was renamed to the Pacific-8 Conference (Pac-8) by the 1968–69 season.); No. 33 retired by UCLA Bruins; 2× Mr. Basketball USA (1964, 1965); 3× First-team Parade All-American (1963–1965); Presidential Medal of Freedom (2016); As head coach: USBL champion (2002); As assistant coach: 2× NBA champion (2009, 2010)

Career NBA statistics
- Points: 38,387 (24.6 ppg)
- Rebounds: 17,440 (11.2 rpg)
- Assists: 5,660 (3.6 apg)
- Stats at NBA.com
- Stats at Basketball Reference
- Basketball Hall of Fame
- Collegiate Basketball Hall of Fame

Kareem Abdul-Jabbar (Note: Pronunciation: /kəˈriːm æbˈduːl dʒəˈbɑːr/, kə-REEM ab-DOOL jə-BAR) (born Ferdinand Lewis Alcindor Jr., (Note: Pronunciation: /ælˈsɪndər/, al-SIN-dər) April 16, 1947) is an American former professional basketball player. He played as a center for 20 seasons in the National Basketball Association (NBA) with the Milwaukee Bucks and Los Angeles Lakers. He played college basketball for the UCLA Bruins. A member of the Naismith Memorial Basketball Hall of Fame, Abdul-Jabbar won a record six NBA Most Valuable Player (MVP) awards. He was a 19-time NBA All-Star, a 15-time All-NBA Team member, and an 11-time NBA All-Defensive Team selection. He was a member of six NBA championship teams as a player and two more as an assistant coach, and was twice voted the NBA Finals MVP. He was named to three NBA anniversary teams (35th, 50th, and 75th). Widely regarded as one of the greatest players of all time, Abdul-Jabbar broke the NBA's career scoring record in 1984, and held it until 2023.

Abdul-Jabbar was known as Lew Alcindor when he played at Power Memorial, a private Catholic high school in New York City, where he led their team to 71 consecutive wins. He played college basketball for the UCLA Bruins, winning three consecutive national championships. Abdul-Jabbar was a record three-time most outstanding player of the NCAA tournament. Drafted with the first overall pick by the one-season-old Milwaukee Bucks franchise in the 1969 NBA draft, he spent six seasons with the team. After leading the Bucks to their first NBA championship at age 24 in 1971, he took the Muslim name Kareem Abdul-Jabbar. Using his trademark skyhook shot, he established himself as one of the league's top scorers. In 1975, he was traded to the Lakers, with whom he played the final 14 seasons of his career, during which time the team won five NBA championships. Abdul-Jabbar's contributions were a key component in the Showtime era of Lakers basketball. Over his 20-year NBA career, his teams reached the playoffs 18 times and reached the NBA Finals ten times.

At the time of his retirement at age 42 in 1989, Abdul-Jabbar was the NBA's regular season career leader in points (38,387), games played (1,560), minutes (57,446), field goals made (15,837), field goal attempts (28,307), blocked shots (3,189), defensive rebounds (9,394), and personal fouls (4,657). He ranks second in career points, minutes played and field goal attempts, and is third all-time in both total rebounds (17,440) and blocked shots. ESPN named him the greatest center of all time in 2007, the greatest player in college basketball history in 2008, and the second best player in NBA history (behind Michael Jordan) in 2016. Abdul-Jabbar has also been an actor, a basketball coach, a best-selling author, and a martial artist, having trained in Jeet Kune Do under Bruce Lee and appeared in his film Game of Death (1972). He also appeared in Airplane! as Roger Murdock, a pilot who is repeatedly mistaken for Abdul-Jabbar. In 2012, Abdul-Jabbar was selected by Secretary of State Hillary Clinton to be a U.S. global cultural ambassador. In 2016, President Barack Obama awarded him the Presidential Medal of Freedom.

== Early life ==
Kareem Abdul-Jabbar was born Ferdinand Lewis Alcindor Jr. in Harlem, New York City, the only child of Cora Lillian, a department store price checker, and Ferdinand Lewis Alcindor Sr., a transit police officer and jazz musician. Cora was born in North Carolina but came to Harlem as part of the Great Migration. Ferdinand Sr. was the child of immigrants from Trinidad; his uncle was the Black activist and medical pioneer Dr. John Alcindor. Abdul-Jabbar grew up in the Dyckman Street projects in the Inwood neighborhood of Upper Manhattan, which he moved to at the age of 3 in 1950. At birth, Abdul-Jabbar weighed 12 lb 11 oz (5.75 kg) and was 22 1/2 inches (57 cm) long. Always very tall for his age, he was already 5 ft 8 in (1.73 m) by the age of nine. Abdul-Jabbar was often depressed as a teenager because of the stares and comments about his height. By the eighth grade (age 13–14), he had grown to 6 ft 8 in (2.03 m) and could already dunk a basketball.

Abdul-Jabbar attended Power Memorial Academy, a private all-boys Catholic high school, where he was one of the few Black students. He wore the jersey number 33, which he chose in tribute to his favorite player, New York Giants fullback Mel Triplett. He would continue wearing this number throughout his college and professional career. He led coach Jack Donohue's teams to three straight New York City Catholic championships, a 71–game winning streak, and a 79–2 overall record. This earned him "The Tower from Power" nickname. His 2,067 total points were a New York City high school record. The team won the national high school boys basketball championship when Abdul-Jabbar was in 10th and 11th grade and was runner-up his senior year. He had a strained relationship in his final year with Donohue after the coach called him a nigger.

Abdul-Jabbar wrote for the Harlem Youth Action Project newspaper. The Harlem riot of 1964, which was prompted by the fatal shooting of 15-year old black boy James Powell by a New York police officer, triggered Abdul-Jabbar's interest in racial politics. "Right then and there, I knew who I was, who I had to be. I was going to be black rage personified, Black Power in the flesh", he said.

== College career ==
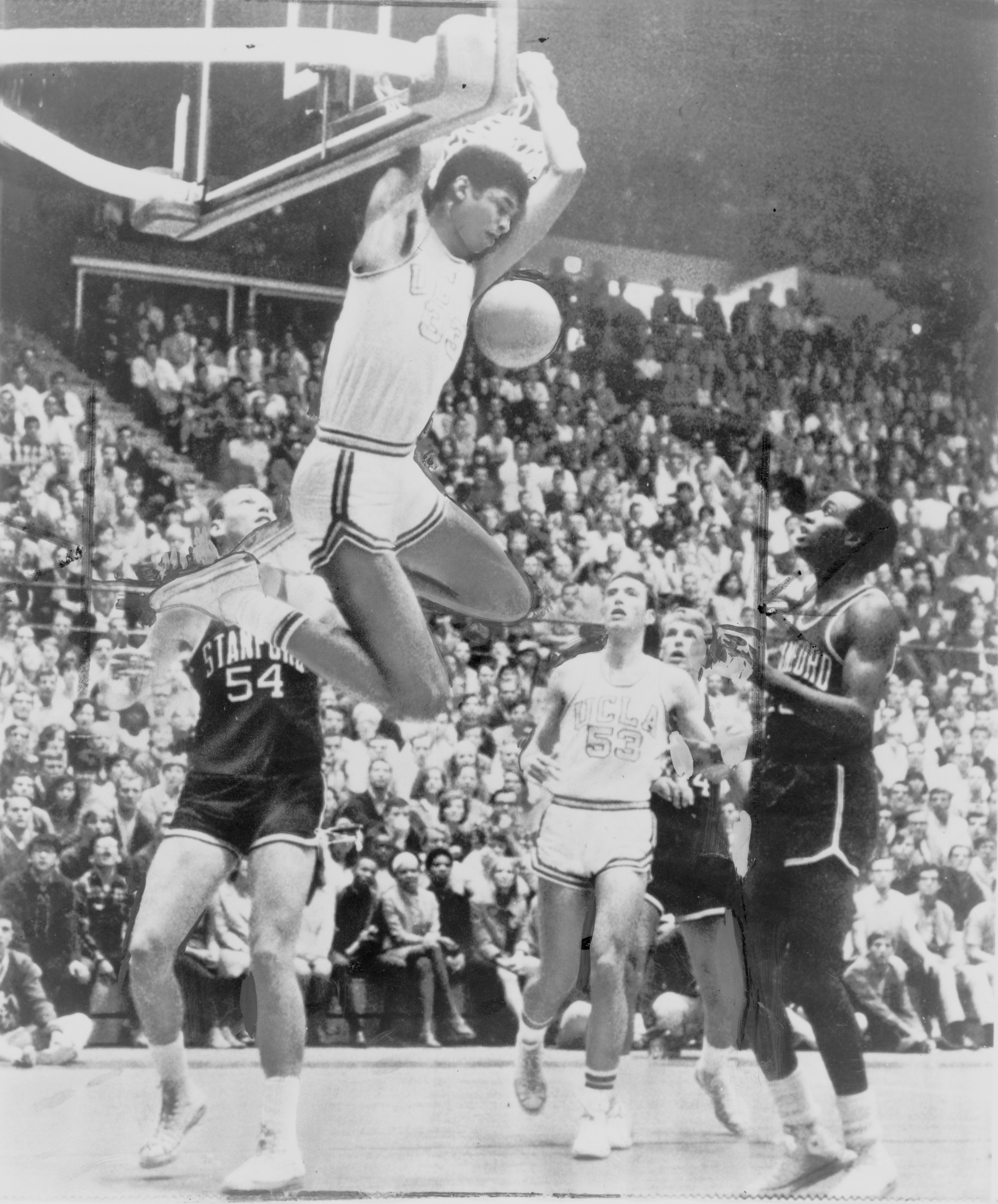
Abdul-Jabbar with the reverse two-hand dunk against Stanford

Abdul-Jabbar was not able to play professionally in the NBA out of high school. At the time, the league only accepted players beginning with the year that they could have hypothetically graduated from college. His other options to play basketball professionally would have been to join the Harlem Globetrotters or play overseas. However, Abdul-Jabbar's goal was to attend college. Recruited by hundreds of schools, he was the most sought-after prospect since Wilt Chamberlain. Southern teams that were segregated were willing to break the color line to acquire Abdul-Jabbar. He chose to attend the University of California, Los Angeles, after being recruited by Bruins assistant coach Jerry Norman. Baseball Hall of Famer and UCLA alumnus Jackie Robinson also wrote to Abdul-Jabbar, encouraging him to attend the college.

By now 7-foot-1-inch (2.16 m) tall, Abdul-Jabbar was relegated to the freshman team in his first year with the Bruins, as freshmen were ineligible to play varsity until 1972. The freshman squad included Lucius Allen, Kenny Heitz, and Lynn Shackelford, who were fellow high-school All-Americans. On November 27, 1965, Abdul-Jabbar made his first public performance in UCLA's annual varsity–freshman exhibition game, attended by 12,051 fans in the inaugural game at the Bruins' new Pauley Pavilion. The 1965–66 varsity team was the two-time defending national champions and the top-ranked team in preseason polls. The freshman team won 75–60 behind Abdul-Jabbar's 31 points and 21 rebounds. It was the first time a freshman team had beaten the UCLA varsity squad. The varsity had lost Gail Goodrich and Keith Erickson from the championship squad to graduation, and starting guard Freddie Goss was out sick. After the game, UPI wrote: "UCLA's Bruins open defense of their national basketball title this week, but right now they're only the second best team on campus." The freshman team was 21–0 that year, dominating against junior college and other freshman teams, as Abdul-Jabbar averaged 33 points and 21 rebounds per game.

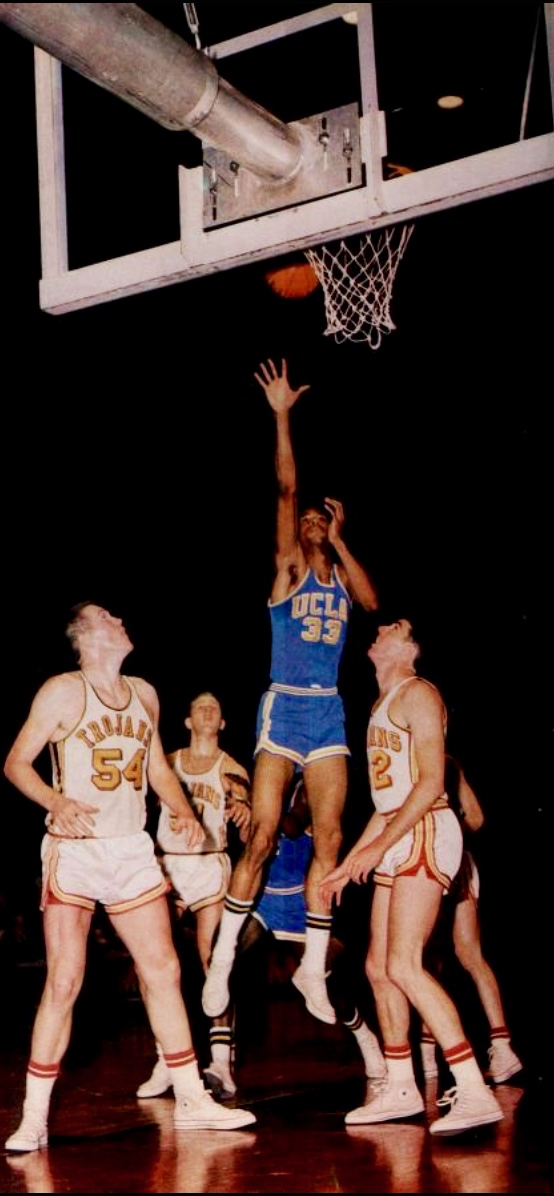
Abdul-Jabbar versus USC

Abdul-Jabbar made his varsity debut as a sophomore in 1966 and received national coverage. Sports Illustrated described him as "The New Superstar" after he scored 56 points in his first game, which is still an NCAA record for a player in their debut. He scored 61 later in the season. Averaging 29 points and 15.5 rebounds per game, he led UCLA to an undefeated 30–0 record and a national championship, their third title in four years and first of seven consecutive. After the season, the dunk was banned in college basketball in an attempt to curtail his dominance; critics dubbed it the "Alcindor Rule". It was not rescinded until the 1976–77 season. Abdul-Jabbar was the main contributor to the team's three-year record of 88 wins and only two losses: one to the University of Houston in which Abdul-Jabbar had an eye injury, and the other to crosstown rival USC who played a "stall game"; there was no shot clock in that era, allowing the Trojans to hold the ball as long as it wanted before attempting to score. They limited Abdul-Jabbar to only four shots and 10 points.

During his college career, Abdul-Jabbar was a three-time national player of the year (1967–1969), a three-time unanimous first-team All-American (1967–1969), played on three NCAA basketball champion teams (1967, 1968, and 1969), was honored as the Most Outstanding Player in the NCAA Tournament three times, and became the first-ever Naismith College Player of the Year in 1969. He was the only player to win the Helms Foundation Player of the Year award three times. He had considered transferring to Michigan because of unfulfilled recruiting promises. UCLA player Willie Naulls introduced Abdul-Jabbar and teammate Lucius Allen to athletic booster Sam Gilbert, who convinced the pair to remain at UCLA.

During his junior year, Abdul-Jabbar suffered a scratched left cornea on January 12, 1968, in a game against California (UC Berkeley) when he was struck by Tom Henderson in a rebound battle. He missed the next two games against Stanford and Portland. His cornea would again be scratched during his pro career, which subsequently caused him to wear goggles for eye protection. On January 20, the Bruins faced coach Guy Lewis's Houston Cougars in the first-ever nationally televised regular-season college basketball game, with 52,693 in attendance at the Astrodome. In a contest billed as the "Game of the Century", Cougar forward Elvin Hayes scored 39 points and had 15 rebounds, while Abdul-Jabbar, suffering from his eye injury, was held to just 15 points as Houston won 71–69, ending UCLA's 47-game winning streak. Hayes and Abdul-Jabbar had a rematch in the semifinals of the NCAA tournament, where UCLA, with a healthy Abdul-Jabbar, defeated Houston 101–69 en route to the national championship. UCLA limited Hayes, who was averaging 37.7 points per game, to only ten points. Wooden credited his assistant Norman for devising the diamond-and-one defense that contained Hayes. Sports Illustrated ran a cover story on the game and used the headline: "Lew's Revenge: The Rout of Houston." As a senior in 1968–69, Abdul-Jabbar led the Bruins to their third consecutive national title.

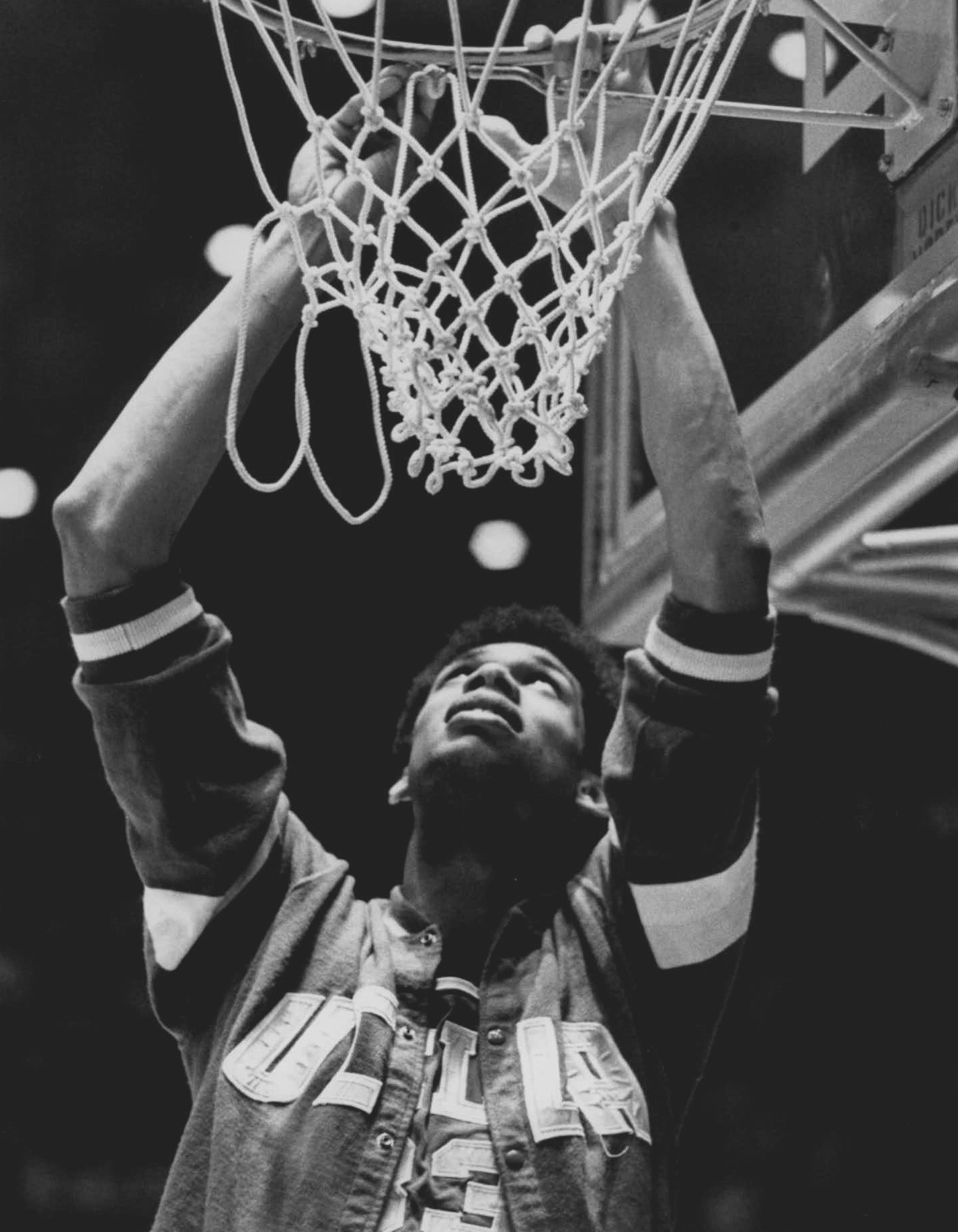
Abdul-Jabbar performing a ceremonial net cutting following the 1969 NCAA basketball championship win over Purdue

During the summer of 1968, Abdul-Jabbar converted to Sunni Islam from Catholicism. He adopted the Arabic name Kareem Abdul-Jabbar, though he did not begin using it publicly until 1971. He boycotted the 1968 Summer Olympics, deciding not to try out for the U.S. Olympic basketball team, who went on to win the gold medal. Abdul-Jabbar was protesting the unequal treatment of African Americans in the United States, stating that he was "trying to point out to the world the futility of winning the gold medal for this country and then coming back to live under oppression".

As the NBA did not allow college underclassmen to make an early NBA draft declaration, Abdul-Jabbar completed his studies and earned a Bachelor of Arts with a major in history in 1969. In his free time, he practiced martial arts. He studied aikido in New York between his sophomore and junior year before learning Jeet Kune Do under Bruce Lee in Los Angeles.

=== School records ===
As of the 2019–20 UCLA Bruins men's basketball team season, he still holds or shares a number of individual records at UCLA:

- Highest career scoring average: 26.4
- Most career field goals: 943 — tied with Don MacLean
- Most points in a season: 870 (1967)
- Highest season scoring average: 29.0 (1967)
- Most field goals in a season: 346 (1967) — also the second most at 303 (1969) and the third most at 294 (1968)
- Most free throw attempts in a season: 274 (1967)
- Most points in a single game: 61
- Most points in a college debut game: 56
- Most field goals in a single game: 26 (vs. Washington State, February 25, 1967)

He is represented in the top ten in a number of other school records, including season and career rebounds, second only to Bill Walton.

== Professional career ==
=== Milwaukee Bucks (1969–1975) ===
==== Rookie of the Year (1969–1970) ====
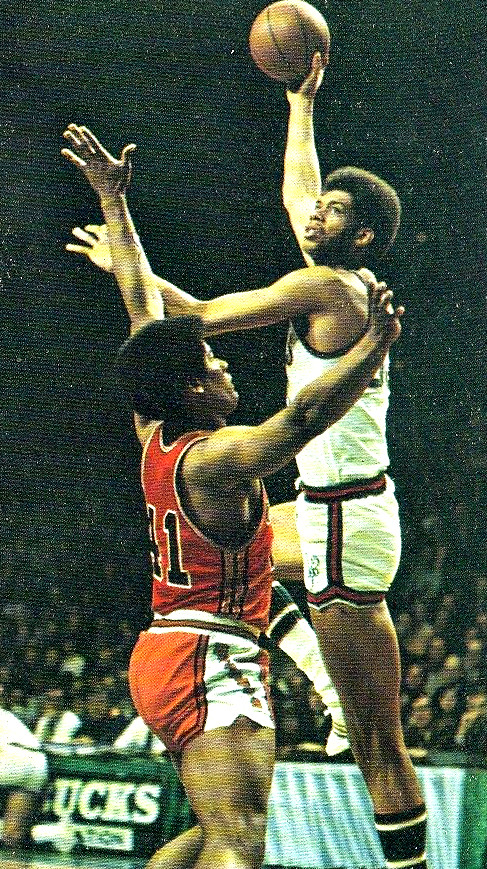
Abdul-Jabbar displaying the skyhook over Wes Unseld of the Baltimore Bullets. The shot was almost impossible to block.

The Globetrotters offered Abdul-Jabbar $1 million to play for them, but he declined and was picked first overall in the 1969 NBA draft by the Milwaukee Bucks, who were in only their second season of existence. The Bucks had won a coin toss with the Phoenix Suns for the first pick. He was also chosen first overall in the 1969 American Basketball Association draft by the New York Nets. The Nets believed that they had the upper hand in securing Abdul-Jabbar's services because he was from New York; however, when Abdul-Jabbar told both the Bucks and the Nets that he would accept only one offer from each team, he rejected the Nets' bid as too low. Sam Gilbert negotiated the contract along with Los Angeles businessman Ralph Shapiro at no charge. After Abdul-Jabbar chose the Milwaukee Bucks' offer of $1.4 million, the Nets offered a guaranteed $3.25 million. Abdul-Jabbar declined the offer, saying: "I might have received more money if I had waited, but I would have degraded the representatives of the N.B.A. and A.B.A. in doing so."

Abdul-Jabbar's presence enabled the Bucks to claim second place in the NBA's Eastern Division with a 56–26 record (improved from 27–55 the previous year). On February 21, 1970, he scored 51 points in a 140–127 win over the SuperSonics. Abdul-Jabbar was an instant star, ranking second in the league in scoring (28.8 ppg) and third in rebounding (14.5 rpg), for which he was awarded the title of NBA Rookie of the Year. In the series-clinching game against the Philadelphia 76ers, he recorded 46 points and 25 rebounds. He was the second rookie to score at least 40 points and 25 rebounds in a playoff game, the first being Wilt Chamberlain. He also set an NBA rookie record with 10 or more games of 20+ points scored during the playoffs, tied by Jayson Tatum in 2018.

==== First championship, MVP, and Finals MVP (1970–1971) ====
The next season, the Bucks acquired All-Star guard Oscar Robertson. Milwaukee went on to record the best record in the league with 66 victories in the 1970–71 season, including a then-record 20 straight wins. Abdul-Jabbar was awarded his first of six NBA Most Valuable Player Awards, along with his first scoring title (31.7 ppg). He also led the league in total points, with 2,596. The Bucks won the NBA title, sweeping the Baltimore Bullets 4–0 in the 1971 NBA Finals. Abdul-Jabbar posted 27 points, 12 rebounds and seven assists in Game 4, and he was named the Finals MVP after averaging 27 points per game on 60.5% shooting in the series.

==== MVP recognition and trade request (1971–1975) ====
During the offseason, Abdul-Jabbar and Robertson joined Bucks head coach Larry Costello on a three-week basketball tour of Africa on behalf of the State Department. In a press conference at the State Department on June 3, 1971, he stated that going forward he wanted to be called by his Muslim name, Kareem Abdul-Jabbar, its translation roughly "noble one, servant of the Almighty [i.e., servant of God]".

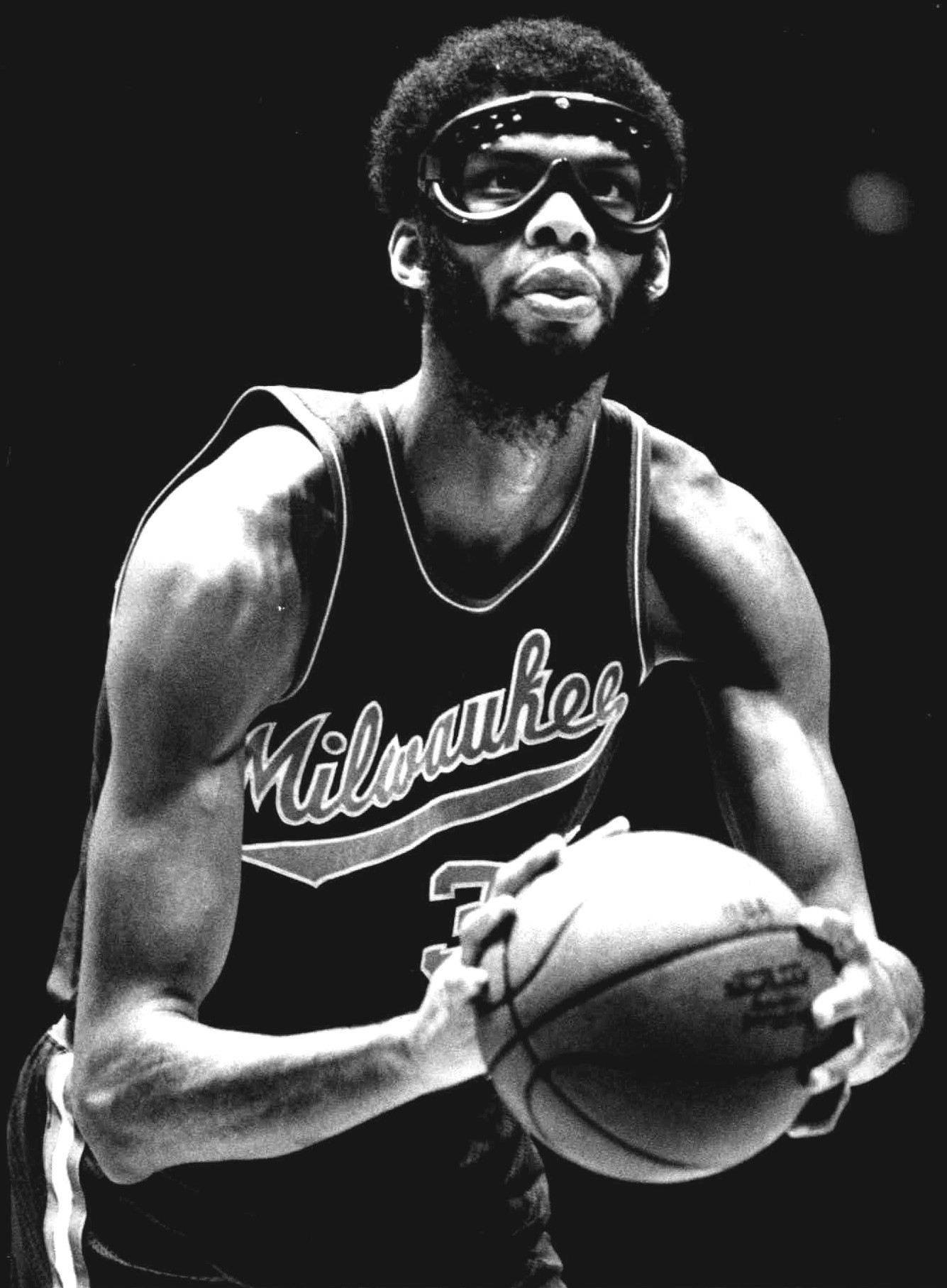
Abdul-Jabbar lines up a free throw. He started wearing goggles in order to avoid damage to his corneas.

Abdul-Jabbar remained a dominant force for the Bucks. The following year, he repeated as scoring champion (34.8 ppg and 2,822 total points) and became the first player to be named the NBA Most Valuable Player twice in his first three years. In 1974, Abdul-Jabbar led the Bucks to their fourth consecutive Midwest Division title, and he won his third MVP Award in four years. He was among the top five NBA players in scoring (27.0 ppg, third), rebounding (14.5 rpg, fourth), blocked shots (283, second), and field goal percentage (.539, second). Milwaukee advanced to the 1974 finals, losing to the Boston Celtics in seven games.

Robertson, who became a free agent in the offseason, retired in September 1974 after he was unable to agree on a contract with the Bucks. On October 3, Abdul-Jabbar privately requested a trade to the New York Knicks, with his second choice being the Washington Bullets (now the Wizards) and his third, the Los Angeles Lakers. He had never spoken negatively of the city of Milwaukee or its fans, but he said that being in the Midwest did not fit his cultural needs. Two days later in a pre-season game before the 1974–75 season against the Celtics in Buffalo, New York, Abdul-Jabbar caught a fingernail in his left eye from Don Nelson and suffered a corneal abrasion; this angered him enough to punch the backboard stanchion, breaking two bones in his right hand. He missed the first 16 games of the season, during which the Bucks were 3–13, and returned in late November wearing protective goggles. On March 13, 1975, sportscaster Marv Albert reported that Abdul-Jabbar requested a trade to either New York or Los Angeles, preferably to the Knicks. The following day after a loss in Milwaukee to the Lakers, Abdul-Jabbar confirmed to reporters his desire to play in another city. He averaged 30.0 points during the season, but Milwaukee finished in last place in the division at 38–44.

=== Los Angeles Lakers (1975–1989) ===
==== Fourth and fifth MVP awards (1975–1977) ====
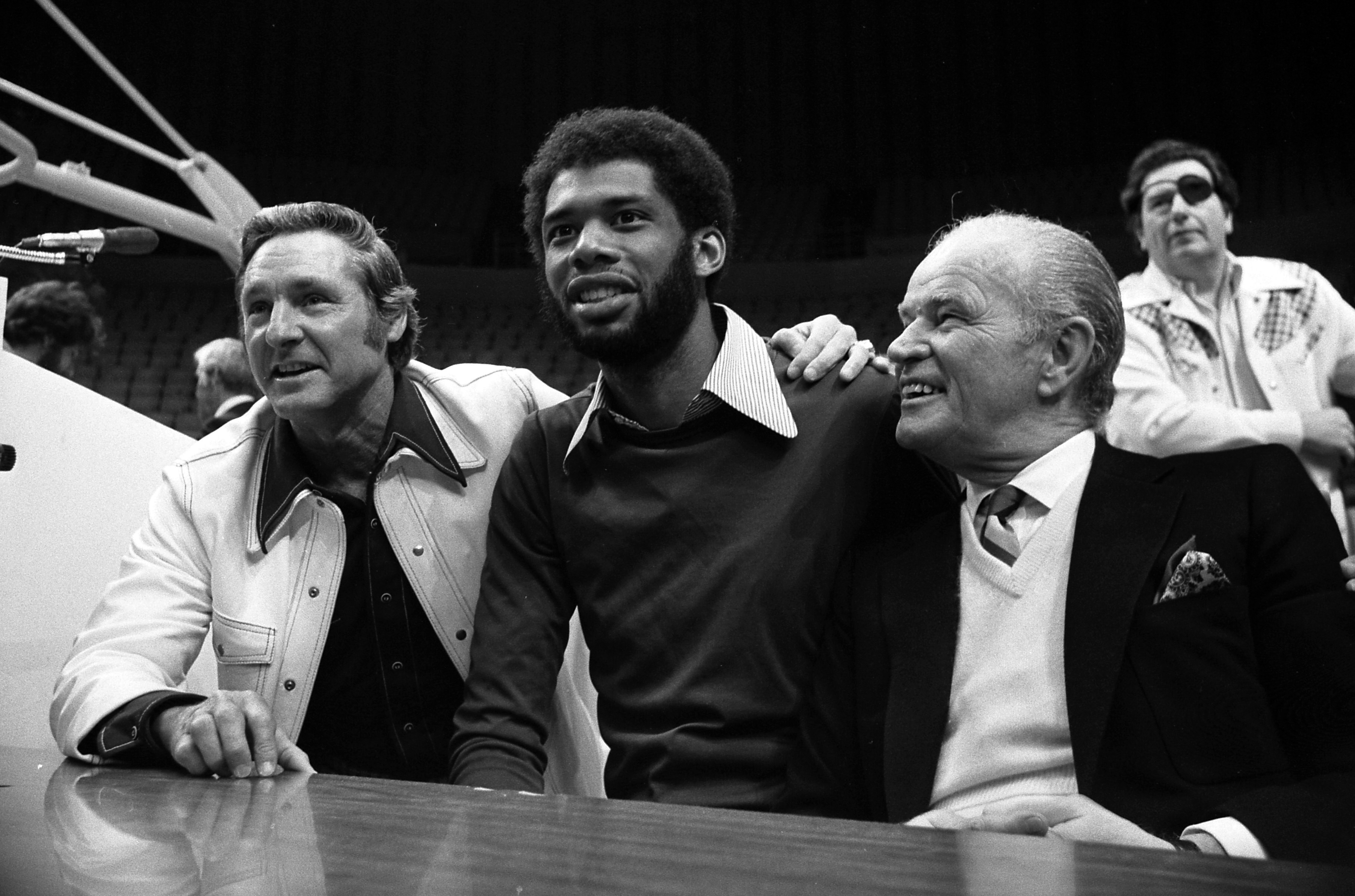
Bill Sharman and Jack Kent Cooke at a press conference announcing the signing of Abdul-Jabbar

In 1975, the Lakers acquired Abdul-Jabbar and reserve center Walt Wesley from the Bucks for center Elmore Smith, guard Brian Winters, blue-chip rookies Dave Meyers and Junior Bridgeman, and cash. In the 1975–76 season, his first with the Lakers, he had a dominating season, averaging 27.7 points per game and leading the league in rebounding (16.9), blocked shots (4.12), and total minutes played (3,379). His 1,111 defensive rebounds remains the NBA single-season record (defensive rebounds were not recorded prior to the 1973–74 season). He earned his fourth MVP award, becoming the first winner in Lakers' franchise history, but missed the post-season for the second straight year as the Lakers finished 40–42.

After acquiring a cast of no-name free agents, the Lakers were projected to finish near the bottom of the Pacific Division in 1976–77. Abdul-Jabbar helped lead the team to the best record (53–29) in the NBA, and he won his fifth MVP award, tying Bill Russell's record. Abdul-Jabbar led the league in field goal percentage (.579), was third in scoring (26.2), and was second in rebounds (13.3) and blocked shots (3.18). In the playoffs, the Lakers beat the Golden State Warriors in the Western Conference semifinals, setting up a confrontation with the Portland Trail Blazers. The result was a memorable matchup, pitting Abdul-Jabbar against a young, injury-free Bill Walton. Although Abdul-Jabbar dominated the series statistically, Walton and the Trail Blazers (who were experiencing their first-ever run in the playoffs) swept the Lakers, behind Walton's skillful passing and timely plays.

==== Playoff disappointments (1977–1979) ====
Two minutes into the opening game of the 1977–78 season, Abdul-Jabbar broke his right hand punching Milwaukee's Kent Benson in retaliation to the rookie's elbow to his stomach. Benson suffered a black right eye and required two stitches. According to Benson, Abdul-Jabbar initiated the elbowing, but there were no witnesses and it was not captured on replays. Abdul-Jabbar, who broke the same bone in 1975 after he punched the backboard support, was out for almost two months and missed 20 games. He was fined a then-league record $5,000 but was not suspended. Benson missed one game but was not punished by the league. The Lakers were 8–13 when Abdul-Jabbar returned. He was not named to the 1978 NBA All-Star Game, the only time in his 20-year career he was not selected to an All-Star Game. Chicago's Artis Gilmore and Detroit's Bob Lanier were chosen as reserves for the West, with Walton starting at center. Amid criticism from the media over his performance, Abdul-Jabbar had 39 points, 20 rebounds, six assists and four blocks in a win over the Philadelphia 76ers the day the All-Star rosters were announced. He added 37 points and 30 rebounds in a victory over the New Jersey Nets (now Brooklyn) in the final game before the All-Star break.

Abdul-Jabbar's play remained strong during the next two seasons, being named to the All-NBA Second Team twice, the All-Defense First Team once, and the All-Defense Second Team once. The Lakers, however, continued to be stymied in the playoffs, being eliminated by the Seattle SuperSonics in both 1978 (first round) and 1979 (semifinals).

==== Last MVP award and championship success (1979–1985) ====
Abdul-Jabbar (right) and Magic Johnson with the Los Angeles Lakers, 1980

The Lakers selected Magic Johnson with the first overall pick of 1979 NBA draft. They had acquired the pick from the New Orleans Jazz (later Utah) in 1976, when league rules required that they compensate Los Angeles for their signing of free agent Gail Goodrich. The addition of Johnson paved the way for the Lakers' Showtime dynasty of the 1980s, appearing in the finals eight times and winning five NBA championships. While less dominant than in his younger years, Abdul-Jabbar reinforced his status as one of the greatest basketball players ever, adding an additional four All-NBA First Team selections and two All-Defense First Team honors. He won his record sixth MVP award in his first season with Johnson in 1979–80. In the 1980 finals, Abdul-Jabbar averaged 33.4 points in five games, spraining his ankle in Game 5, but returning to finish the contest with 40 points and leading the team to a win. He missed Game 6, when the Lakers clinched the title, and Johnson was named the Finals MVP after recording 42 points, 15 rebounds, and seven assists in the finale.

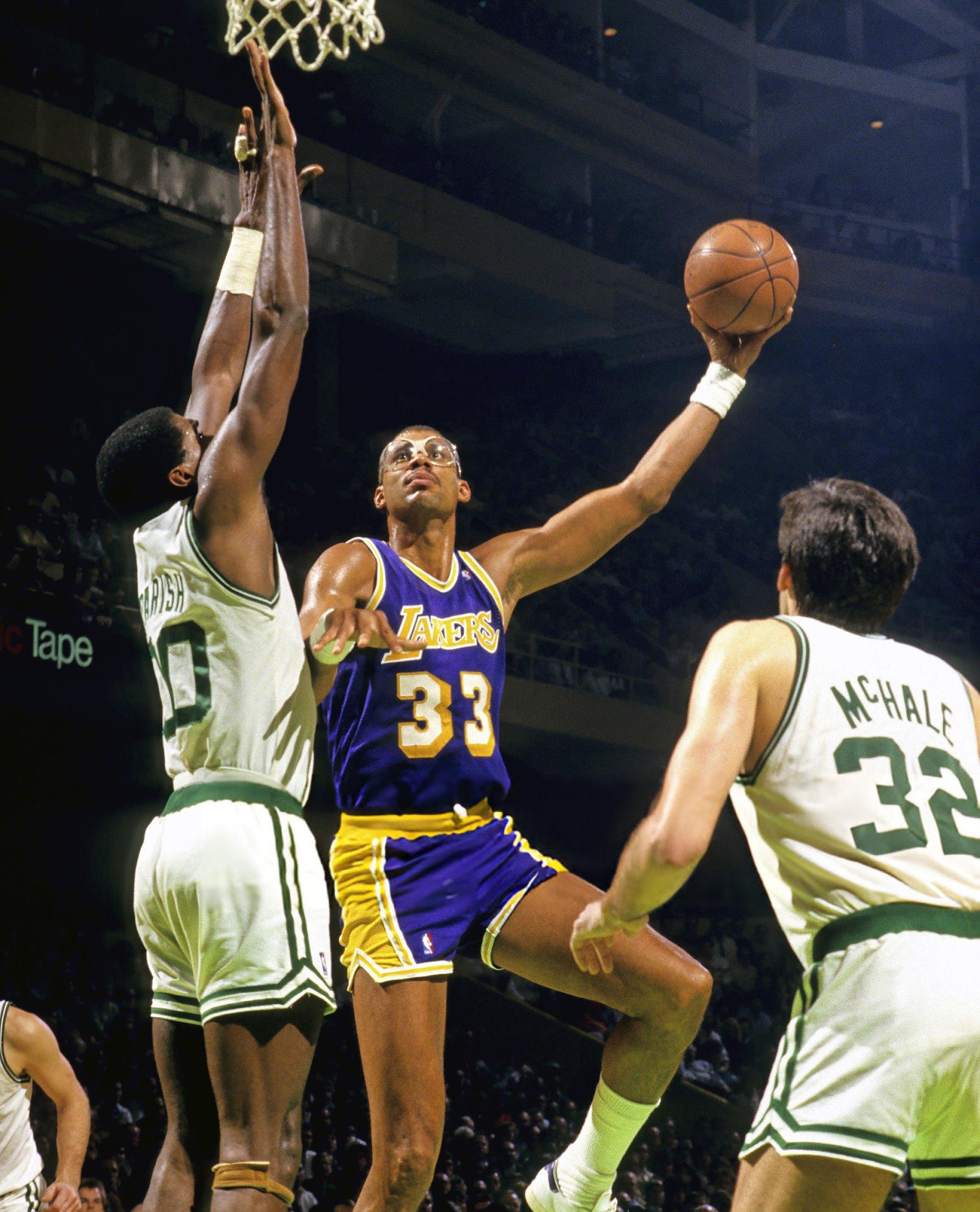
Abdul-Jabbar against the Boston Celtics in the 1980s

Abdul-Jabbar continued to average 20 or more points per game in the following six seasons. The Lakers won another championship in 1981–82, but he suffered migraines in the finals, averaging just 18 points per game against Philadelphia. In 14 playoff games, he finished with a 20.4 point average, the lowest of his career at the time. The Lakers advanced to the 1983 NBA Finals in a rematch against the 76ers, who had acquired Moses Malone to shore up their center position after Abdul-Jabbar had outplayed their big-man duo of Darryl Dawkins and Caldwell Jones in the previous finals. The 76ers swept the Lakers 4–0, and Malone was named the Finals MVP after outrebounding Abdul-Jabbar 72–30 in the series. Malone had 27 offensive rebounds, which nearly equaled Abdul-Jabbar's total rebounds (30).

Before the 1983–84 season, Abdul-Jabbar signed a two-year, $3 million contract with the Lakers, with none of the amount deferred. He fell ill with viral hepatitis during training camp, rendering him weak for a month after returning. He scored 10 points at Golden State on December 22, 1983, dropping his season average to 17.7, almost 10 points below his career average. His scoring picked up after Christmas. On the road against Utah on April 5, 1984, Abdul-Jabbar broke Chamberlain's record for most career points in the NBA. He received a pass from Johnson and scored from 15 feet (4.6 m) on his patent skyhook over the 7-foot-4-inch (2.24 m) shot-blocking specialist Mark Eaton. The game was played at the Thomas & Mack Center, one of 11 home games for the Jazz in the Las Vegas Valley that season. The contest drew 18,389 fans, the Jazz's largest home crowd since moving from New Orleans before the 1979–80 season. For the first time since the 1980–81 season, Abdul-Jabbar led the Lakers in both scoring (21.5) and rebounding (7.3) during the season. Playing consistently better than he had over the past few years, he was named to the All-NBA First Team for the ninth time in his career, and he was voted to the All-NBA Defensive Second Team, the final all-defensive selection of his career. The team advanced to the 1984 NBA Finals but lost to Boston.

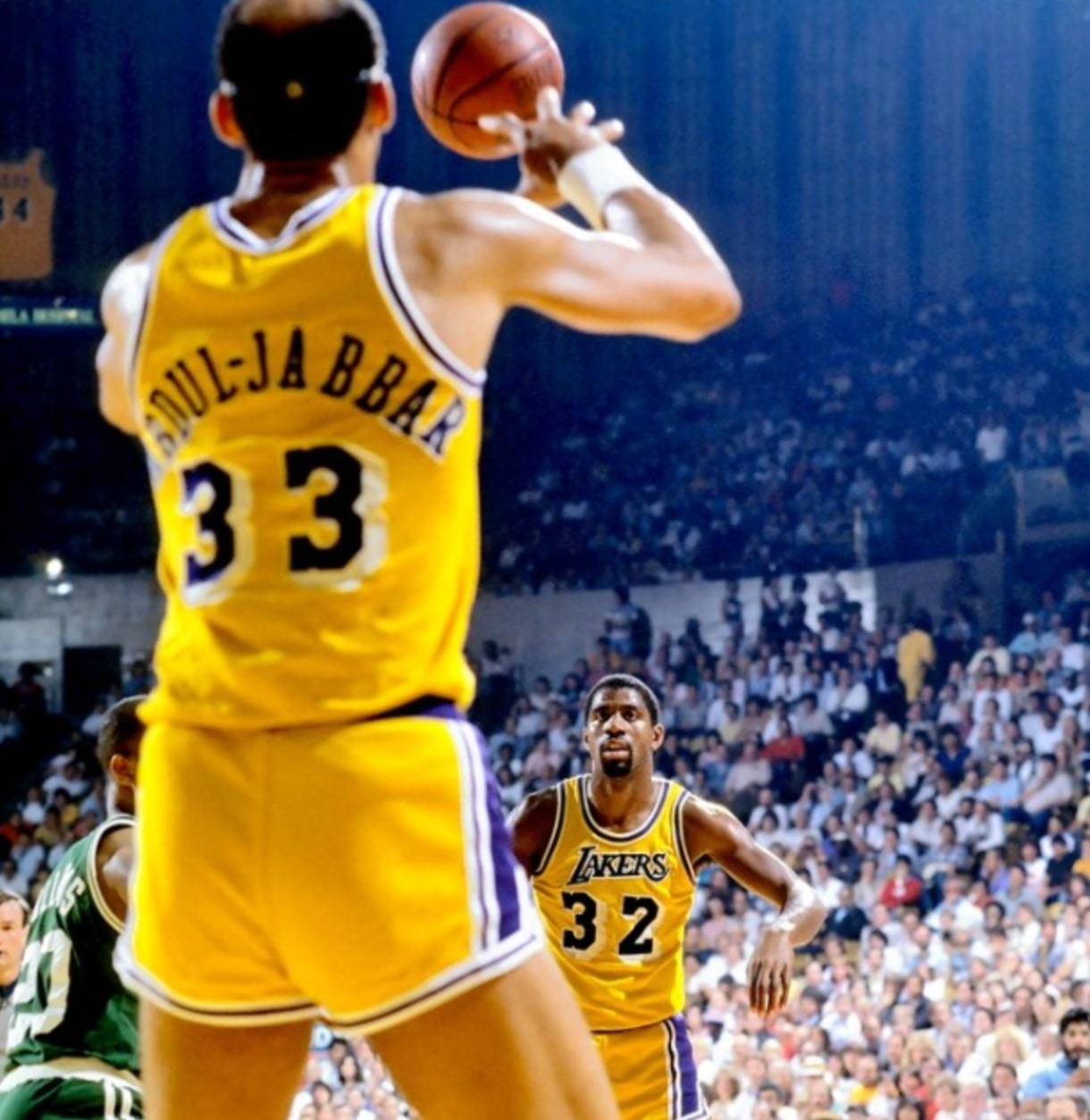
Abdul-Jabbar receiving a pass from Magic Johnson during the 1985 NBA Finals

The 1984–85 season was expected to be Abdul-Jabbar's final season, as he had maintained since breaking Chamberlain's record that he would be retiring. Teams began honoring him in his final appearance in their home arena, but the Lakers instructed them not to use the word retirement in their ceremony. He had left open the possibility of changing his mind, but did not want to accept retirement gifts and play again, as Dave Cowens had done. On December 5, 1984, Abdul-Jabbar agreed to a one-year, $2 million contract extension with the Lakers, with none of the money deferred. He won his second Finals MVP in 1985, when he became the oldest to win the award at 38 years and 54 days old. He averaged 25.7 points, 9 rebounds, 5.2 assists and 1.5 blocks in the series against the Celtics. He was initially outplayed in Game 1, scoring 12 points with three rebounds against 30-year-old Boston center Robert Parish, who had 18 points and eight rebounds in a 148–114 win over the Lakers, dubbed the "Memorial Day Massacre". At the team's film session the following day, Abdul-Jabbar—who normally sat near the back—was seated in the front row, and accepted all of head coach Pat Riley's criticism. Before Game 2, Abdul-Jabbar asked if his father could ride on the team bus to the game. Typically a hard-liner on rules, Riley agreed to make an exception. Abdul-Jabbar bounced back with 30 points, 17 rebounds, eight assists and three blocks in a 109–102 victory. In the Lakers’ four wins, he averaged 30.2 points, 11.3 rebounds, 6.5 assists and 2.0 blocks. The title ended the Celtics' streak of eight consecutive championships against the Lakers.

==== Final playing years and sixth ring (1985–1989) ====
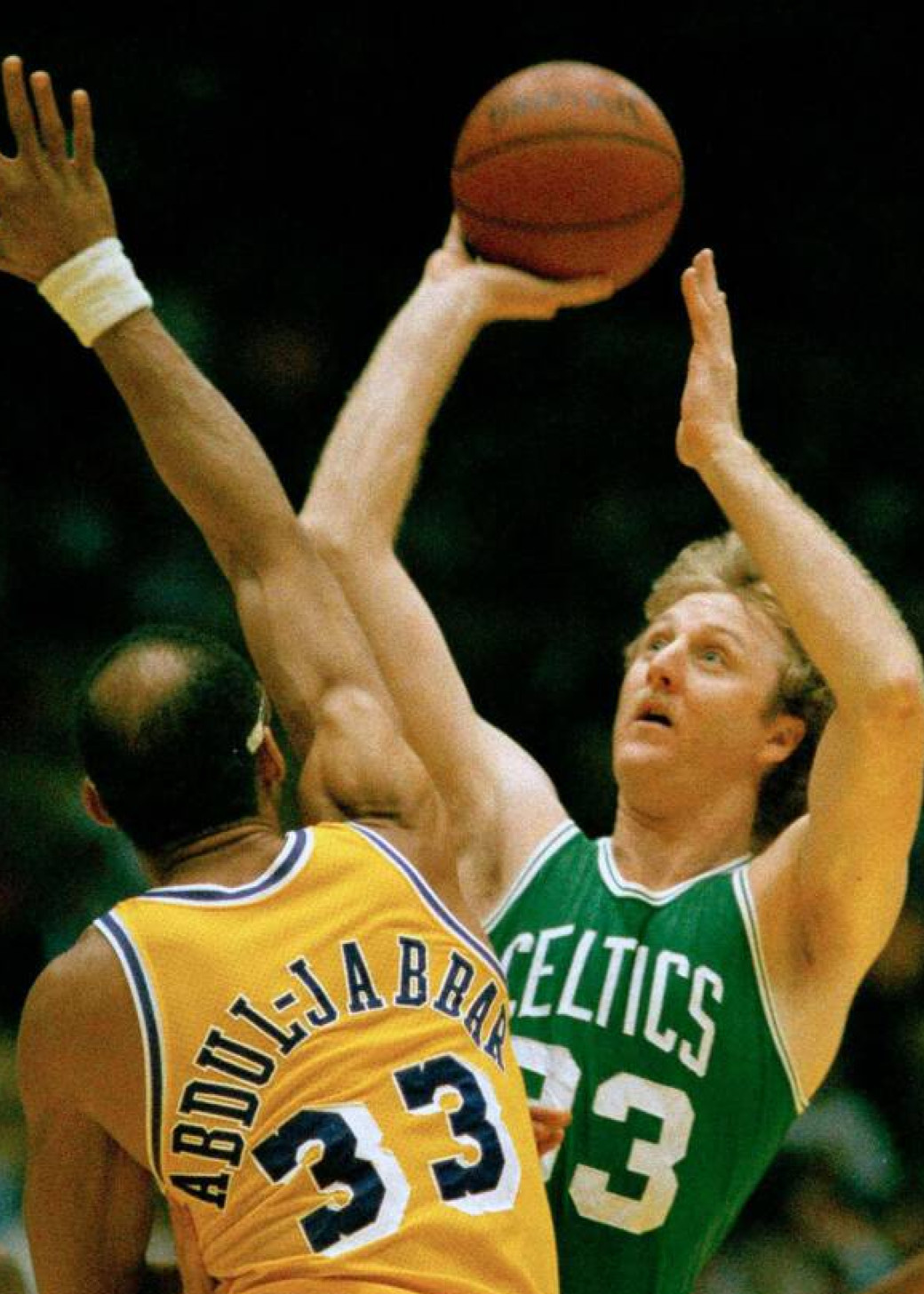
Abdul-Jabbar defending the Celtics' Larry Bird.

Abdul-Jabbar played in his 17th season in 1985–86, breaking the previous NBA record for seasons played of 16, held by Dolph Schayes, John Havlicek, Paul Silas, and Elvin Hayes. On November 12, 1985, he signed to a one-year extension of his contract at the same $2 million salary, while maintaining the option to retire after the 1985–86 season. Prior to the 1986–87 season, he gained 13 pounds (5.9 kg), reaching close to 270 pounds (120 kg), to compete against the growing number of 7-footers (2.1 m) in the league. The Lakers advanced to the NBA Finals in each of his final three seasons, starting with a championship over Boston in 1987. Afterwards, he signed a two-year contract with the Lakers.

Riley guaranteed that the Lakers would be the first NBA team to win consecutive titles since the 1968–69 Celtics, and they defeated the Detroit Pistons for the championship in 1988. Abdul-Jabbar made only 3 of 14 shots in Game 6 of the finals, but he converted two free throws with 14 seconds remaining to extend the series to seven games. After winning the season finale, in which he had only four points and three rebounds, the 41-year-old center announced in the locker room that he would return for one more season before retiring. His points, rebounds, and minutes had dropped in his 19th season, and there were reports prior to the game that he was retiring after the contest. On his "retirement tour" he received standing ovations at games, both home and away, and gifts ranging from a yacht that said "Captain Skyhook" to framed jerseys from his career to a Persian rug. At the Forum against Seattle in his final regular season game, every Laker came onto the court wearing Abdul-Jabbar's trademark goggles. The Lakers lost to the Pistons in a four-game sweep in the 1989 finals.

At the time of his retirement, Abdul-Jabbar held the record for most career games played in the NBA. He was also the all-time record holder for most minutes played (57,446), most field goals made (15,837), most points (38,387), and most 1,000-point seasons (19).

In December 1991, as a result of former teammate Magic Johnson's diagnosis of HIV, Abdul-Jabbar said on The NFL Today on CBS he was considering unretiring at the age of 44 as a show of support to Johnson and to raise awareness of AIDS. He said if he came back, much of his salary would be donated to fund AIDS research. Public reaction to the idea was mixed, with Los Angeles Times' Mike Downey writing, "A comeback for a good cause is one we should embrace, and if one life could be saved, or even prolonged, with whatever funds Abdul-Jabbar can accumulate .... then good," while Tampa Bay Times' Hubert Mizell writing that prior to retiring, Abdul-Jabbar "had overstayed his NBA time. Retirement at 38 ... He would have flurries of vintage brilliance, but the total Abdul-Jabbar package at age 42 was slightly ill-focused." Tom Kayser, general manager of the CBA's Rockford Lightning, offered a spot to Abdul-Jabbar if he were to come out of retirement, so that he could get back in shape before going to the NBA again. On February 26, 1992, Abdul-Jabbar said he was no longer considering a comeback.

== Coaching career ==
In 1995, Abdul-Jabbar began expressing an interest in coaching and imparting knowledge from his playing days. His opportunities were limited despite the success he enjoyed during his playing days. During his playing years, Abdul-Jabbar had developed a reputation for being introverted and sullen. He was often unfriendly with the media. His sensitivity and shyness created a perception of him being aloof and surly. At the time, his mentality was that he either did not have the time or did not owe anything to anyone. Magic Johnson recalled as a kid being brushed off after asking him for an autograph. Abdul-Jabbar might freeze out a reporter if they touched him, and he once refused to stop reading the newspaper while giving an interview.

Abdul-Jabbar had spent most of his career with a reserved attitude towards media attention (since he did not have to deal with it as a star at UCLA) before he softened up near the end of his career. Abdul-Jabbar said: "I didn't understand that I also had affected people that way and that's what it was all about. I always saw it like they were trying to pry. I was way too suspicious and I paid a price for it." However, he believes it was his reputation as a "difficult person", alongside his attempts at trying to break into coaching while nearing the age of fifty, that affected his chances of becoming a head coach within the NBA or NCAA.

Abdul-Jabbar worked as an assistant for the Los Angeles Clippers and the Seattle SuperSonics, helping mentor, among others, their young centers, Michael Olowokandi and Jerome James. Abdul-Jabbar was the head coach of the Oklahoma Storm of the United States Basketball League in 2002, leading the team to the league's championship that season, but he failed to land the head coaching position at Columbia University a year later. He then worked as a scout for the New York Knicks. He returned to the Lakers as a special assistant coach to Phil Jackson for six seasons (2005–2011). Early on, he mentored their young center, Andrew Bynum. Abdul-Jabbar also served as a volunteer coach at Alchesay High School on the Fort Apache Indian Reservation in Whiteriver, Arizona, in 1998. He moved on from coaching in 2013 after unsuccessfully lobbying for open head coach positions with UCLA and the Milwaukee Bucks.

== Player profile ==
On offense, Abdul-Jabbar was a dominant low-post threat. In contrast to other low-post specialists like Wilt Chamberlain or Shaquille O'Neal, he was a slender giant, standing 7 ft 2 in (2.18 m) tall while weighing around 240 to 250 lb (110 to 115 kg), although he bulked to 270 lb (120 kg) in 1986; in his early years, he used that frame for agility and speed while in later years he utilized a bigger frame for trying to guard under the basket. Abdul-Jabbar was famous for his ambidextrous skyhook shot. It contributed to his .559 career field goal percentage, which ranked eighth in NBA history at the time of his retirement, (Note: Minimum 2,000 field goals made. Ranked 23rd through 2023–24 season.) and reputation as a feared clutch shooter. He shot above 50% in every season but his last.

Abdul-Jabbar maintained a dominant presence on defense. He was selected to the NBA All-Defensive Team eleven times. He frustrated opponents with his superior shot-blocking ability and denied an average of 2.6 shots a game. He was not an aggressive rebounder, relying more on his size as a 7-footer instead of positioning. After the pounding he endured early in his career, his rebounding average fell to between six or eight a game in his latter years. As a teammate, Abdul-Jabbar exuded natural leadership and was affectionately called "Cap", or "Captain", by his colleagues. He had an even temperament, which Riley said made him coachable.

A strict fitness regime made Abdul-Jabbar one of the most durable players of all time. He began a year-round conditioning program at age 26. While in Los Angeles, Abdul-Jabbar started doing yoga in 1976 to improve his flexibility, and was notable for his physical fitness regimen. He said: "There is no way I could have played as long as I did without yoga." Because of his metabolism, he had difficulty putting on weight. Prior to the 1979–80 season, he gained 10 pounds (4.5 kg) from 240 to 250 pounds (110 kg) after switching from free weights to Nautilus equipment. He also switched that offseason from tai chi to yoga. To reduce wear during his later years, Riley did not have him inbound the ball on made baskets, and had him wait at the opposite end of the court on free throws. In what he described as playing a "smarter game" to conserve energy, Abdul-Jabbar sometimes would be the last player to set up on offense by several seconds after staying behind on defense to see if the Lakers scored on a fast break. In 1981, he responded to criticism that he did not hustle: "You have to understand I have to play 42 to 45 minutes a night, and it's like mowing a huge estate lawn. If you rush out and run around furiously, it's self-defeating. You'll be worn out just at the point when you're most needed." Abdul-Jabbar finished his career with then-NBA records of 20 seasons and 1,560 games played, later broken by former Celtics center Robert Parish.

Abdul-Jabbar began wearing his trademark goggles after getting poked in the eye during preseason in 1974. He continued wearing them for years until abandoning them in the 1979 playoffs. He resumed wearing goggles in October 1980 after being accidentally poked in the right eye by Houston's Rudy Tomjanovich. After years of being jabbed in the eyes, Abdul-Jabbar developed corneal erosion syndrome, occasionally experiencing pain when his eyes dry up. He missed three games in December 1986 due to the condition.

=== Skyhook ===
Abdul-Jabbar was well known for his trademark skyhook, a hook shot in which he raised the ball and released it at the highest point of his arm's arching motion. He could shoot the skyhook from up to 16 feet (4.9 m). With his long arms and great height, he released the ball so high that it was difficult for a defender to block without committing a goaltending violation. His body being between the defender and the ball made it more difficult to block, as did extending his non-shooting arm to fend off opponents. He was stronger shooting the skyhook with his right hand than he was with his left, which he developed in his later years.

According to Abdul-Jabbar, he learned the move in fifth grade after practicing with the ambidextrous Mikan Drill and soon learned to value it, as it was "the only shot I could use that didn't get smashed back in my face". He also watched Cliff Hagan shoot the hook with the St. Louis Hawks. To prevent his hook from being blocked from behind, he was advised by Wooden to do away with the typical sweeping motion of a hook shot, instead keeping the ball close to his body and shooting with a straighter motion. Abdul-Jabbar's hook shot improved in his junior year at UCLA, after the dunk was banned. In his final college years, he often released the ball several feet above the rim.

== Legacy ==
Abdul-Jabbar won a record six MVP awards. His 38,387 career points remained the NBA's career scoring record until February 7, 2023, when he was surpassed by LeBron James of the Lakers in Los Angeles. Abdul-Jabbar attended the game, and passed the game ball to James during the in-game ceremony after the record was broken. Abdul-Jabbar held the scoring mark for nearly 39 years, the longest span in league history. His skyhook is considered one of the most unstoppable shots ever. He won six NBA championships and two Finals MVP awards, was voted to 15 All-NBA and 11 All-Defensive Teams, and was selected to 19 All-Star teams, a record which stood until it was surpassed by James in 2024. Abdul-Jabbar was named to the NBA's 35th, 50th, and 75th anniversary teams. He averaged 24.6 points, 11.2 rebounds, 3.6 assists, and 2.6 blocks per game in his career, including three straight seasons where he averaged at least 30 points and 16 rebounds, and six times he averaged at least 27 points and 14.5 rebounds in the same season. He is ranked as the NBA's third leading all-time rebounder (17,440). He is the third all-time in registered blocks (3,189), which is impressive because this basketball statistic was not recorded until the fourth year of his career (1974). He is one of five players who have led the NBA in rebounding and blocks in the same season. (Note: The others are Bill Walton, Hakeem Olajuwon, Ben Wallace, and Dwight Howard.)

Abdul-Jabbar combined dominance during his career peak with the longevity and sustained excellence of his later years. A pioneer in using yoga in the NBA, he also credited Bruce Lee with teaching him "the discipline and spirituality of martial arts, which was greatly responsible for me being able to play competitively in the NBA for 20 years with very few injuries". Abdul-Jabbar played in 95 percent of his team's regular-season games during his career, including 80 or more games in 11 of his 20 seasons. Five times he played in all 82 games. After claiming his sixth and final MVP in 1980, he continued to average above 20 points in the following six seasons, including 23 points per game in his 17th season at age 38. He earned first-team All-NBA selections that were 15 years apart and Finals MVPs 14 seasons from each other.

Among the most graceful basketball players ever, Abdul-Jabbar is regarded as one of the best centers ever and one of the greatest players in NBA history; he was voted the best center of all time by ESPN ahead of Wilt Chamberlain in 2007, and ranked No. 4 in Slam's "Top 100 Players Of All-Time" in 2018, and No. 3 in ESPN's list of the top 74 NBA players of all time in 2020, the best center ever ahead of Bill Russell and Chamberlain. League experts and basketball legends frequently mentioned him when considering the greatest player of all time. Riley said in 1985: "Why judge anymore? When a man has broken records, won championships, endured tremendous criticism and responsibility, why judge? Let's toast him as the greatest player ever." In 2023, as James was on the verge of breaking the NBA career scoring record, Abdul-Jabbar remained as Riley's choice as the greatest: "We don't win championships without the greatest player in the history of the game, who had the greatest weapon in the history of the game. The skyhook was unstoppable. Last minute of the game, it's going to one guy". As president of the Miami Heat, Riley had won two NBA titles with James on their roster. Isiah Thomas remarked: "If they say the numbers don't lie, then Kareem is the greatest ever to play the game." In 2013, Julius Erving said: "In terms of players all-time, Kareem is still the number one guy. He's the guy you gotta start your franchise with." In 2015, ESPN named Abdul-Jabbar the best center in NBA history, and ranked him No. 2 behind Michael Jordan among the greatest NBA players ever. While Jordan's shots were enthralling and considered unfathomable, Abdul-Jabbar's skyhook appeared automatic, and he himself called the shot "unsexy". In 2016, Abdul-Jabbar's only recognized rookie card became the most expensive basketball card ever sold (the record has since been surpassed) when it went for $501,900 at auction. In 2022, he was ranked No. 3 (first in his position) in ESPN's NBA 75th Anniversary Team list, and No. 3 (behind Jordan and James) in a similar list by The Athletic.

Abdul-Jabbar was also the first ever NBA player to sign a sneaker endorsement deal with Adidas in 1978. He went on to become the first ever player with a signature shoe shortly after. In 2014, the UCLA Bruins wore "The Blueprint" Crazy 8 against Colorado on Feb. 13, and the shoes were sold online and at an Adidas store in New Orleans—during NBA All-Star weekend—starting on Feb. 14.

== NBA career statistics ==
Legend
GP	Games played	GS	Games started	MPG	Minutes per game
FG%	Field goal percentage	3P%	3-point field goal percentage	FT%	Free throw percentage
RPG	Rebounds per game	APG	Assists per game	SPG	Steals per game
BPG	Blocks per game	PPG	Points per game	**Bold**	Career high
†	Won an NBA championship	*	Led the league	‡	NBA record

=== Regular season ===
Year	Team	GP	GS	MPG	FG%	3P%	FT%	RPG	APG	SPG	BPG	PPG
1969–70	Milwaukee	**82***	—	43.1	.518	—	.653	14.5	4.1	—	—	28.8
1970–71†	Milwaukee	**82**	—	40.1	.577	—	.690	16.0	3.3	—	—	31.7*
1971–72	Milwaukee	81	—	**44.2**	.574	—	.689	16.6	4.6	—	—	**34.8***
1972–73	Milwaukee	76	—	42.8	.554	—	.713	16.1	5.0	—	—	30.2
1973–74	Milwaukee	81	—	43.8	.539	—	.702	14.5	4.8	1.4	3.5	27.0
1974–75	Milwaukee	65	—	42.3	.513	—	.763	14.0	4.1	1.0	3.3*	30.0
1975–76	L.A. Lakers	**82**	**82**	41.2	.529	—	.703	**16.9***	5.0	1.5	**4.1***	27.7
1976–77	L.A. Lakers	**82**	**82**	36.8	.579*	—	.701	13.3	3.9	1.2	3.2	26.2
1977–78	L.A. Lakers	62	—	36.5	.550	—	**.783**	12.9	4.3	**1.7**	3.0	25.8
1978–79	L.A. Lakers	80	—	39.5	.577	—	.736	12.8	**5.4**	1.0	4.0*	23.8
1979–80†	L.A. Lakers	**82**	—	38.3	**.604**	.000	.765	10.8	4.5	1.0	3.4*	24.8
1980–81	L.A. Lakers	80	—	37.2	.574	.000	.766	10.3	3.4	.7	2.9	26.2
1981–82†	L.A. Lakers	76	76	35.2	.579	.000	.706	8.7	3.0	.8	2.7	23.9
1982–83	L.A. Lakers	79	79	32.3	.588	.000	.749	7.5	2.5	.8	2.2	21.8
1983–84	L.A. Lakers	80	**80**	32.8	.578	.000	.723	7.3	2.6	.7	1.8	21.5
1984–85†	L.A. Lakers	79	79	33.3	.599	.000	.732	7.9	3.2	.8	2.1	22.0
1985–86	L.A. Lakers	79	79	33.3	.564	.000	.765	6.1	3.5	.8	1.6	23.4
1986–87†	L.A. Lakers	78	78	31.3	.564	**.333**	.714	6.7	2.6	.6	1.2	17.5
1987–88†	L.A. Lakers	80	**80**	28.9	.532	.000	.762	6.0	1.7	.6	1.2	14.6
1988–89	L.A. Lakers	74	74	22.9	.475	.000	.739	4.5	1.0	.5	1.1	10.1
Career		1,560	789	36.8	.559	.056	.721	11.2	3.6	.9	2.6	24.6
All-Star		18	13	24.9	.493	.000	.820	8.3	2.8	.4	2.1‡	13.9

=== Playoffs ===
Year	Team	GP	GS	MPG	FG%	3P%	FT%	RPG	APG	SPG	BPG	PPG
1970	Milwaukee	10	—	43.5	.567	—	.733	16.8	4.1	—	—	**35.2**
1971†	Milwaukee	14	—	41.2	.515	—	.673	17.0	2.5	—	—	26.6
1972	Milwaukee	11	—	46.4	.437	—	.704	**18.2**	**5.1**	—	—	28.7
1973	Milwaukee	6	—	46.0	.428	—	.543	16.2	2.8	—	—	22.8
1974	Milwaukee	16	—	**47.4**	.557	—	.736	15.8	4.9	1.3	2.4	32.2
1977	L.A. Lakers	11	—	42.5	**.607**	—	.725	17.7	4.1	**1.7**	3.5	34.6
1978	L.A. Lakers	3	—	44.7	.521	—	.556	13.7	3.7	.7	4.0	27.0
1979	L.A. Lakers	8	—	45.9	.579	—	**.839**	12.6	4.8	1.0	**4.1**	28.5
1980†	L.A. Lakers	15	—	41.2	.572	—	.790	12.1	3.1	1.1	3.9	31.9
1981	L.A. Lakers	3	—	44.7	.462	—	.714	16.7	4.0	1.0	2.7	26.7
1982†	L.A. Lakers	14	—	35.2	.520	—	.632	8.5	3.6	1.0	3.2	20.4
1983	L.A. Lakers	15	—	39.2	.568	.000	.755	7.7	2.8	1.1	3.7	27.1
1984	L.A. Lakers	21	—	36.5	.555	—	.750	8.2	3.8	1.1	2.1	23.9
1985†	L.A. Lakers	19	19	32.1	.560	—	.777	8.1	4.0	1.2	1.9	21.9
1986	L.A. Lakers	14	14	34.9	.557	—	.787	5.9	3.5	1.1	1.7	25.9
1987†	L.A. Lakers	18	18	31.1	.530	.000	.795	6.8	2.0	.4	1.9	19.2
1988†	L.A. Lakers	**24**	**24**	29.9	.464	.000	.789	5.5	1.5	.6	1.5	14.1
1989	L.A. Lakers	15	15	23.4	.463	—	.721	3.9	1.3	.3	.7	11.1
Career		237	90	37.3	.533	.000	.740	10.5	3.2	1.0	2.4	24.3

== Awards and honors ==
Presidential Medal of Freedom (2016)

Halls of Fame

- National Collegiate Basketball Hall of Fame – Class of 2007
- Naismith Memorial Basketball Hall of Fame – Class of 1995
- NYC Basketball Hall of Fame – Inaugural Class of 1990
- Pac-12 Conference Hall of Honor – Class of 2003
- UCLA Athletics Hall of Fame – Inaugural Class of 1984

High school

- 2× Mr. Basketball USA (1964, 1965)
- 3× First-team Parade All-American (1963–1965)
- 3× CHSAA champion (1963–1965)

NCAA

- 3× National College Player of the Year
  - 3× Helms Foundation College Basketball Player of the Year (1967–1969)
  - 2× Associated Press College Basketball Player of the Year (1967, 1969)
  - 2× Sporting News College Basketball Player of the Year (1967, 1969)
  - 2× Oscar Robertson Trophy winner (1967, 1968)
  - 2× UPI College Basketball Player of the Year (1967, 1969)
  - Naismith College Player of the Year (1969)
- 3× Consensus first-team All-American (1967–1969)
  - 3× AP first team All-American (1967–1969)
  - 3× USBWA first team All-American (1967–1969)
  - 3× NABC first team All-American (1967–1969)
  - 3× UPI first team All-American (1967–1969)
- 3× NCAA champion (1967–1969)
- 3× NCAA Tournament Most Outstanding Player (1967–1969)
- 3× Pac-8 regular season champion (1967–1969)
- 3× First-team All-Pac-8 (1967–1969)
- 3× Pac-8 scoring champion (1967–1969)
- 3× Pac-8 rebounding leader (1967–1969)
- Pac-12 Player of the 20th Century (Note: After expansion, the Pac-8 is now known as the Pac-12.)
- Pac-12 All-Century Team
- No. 33 retired by UCLA Bruins
- UC Presidential Medal (2024)
- Pac-12 records
  - Points per game, career: 26.42
  - Points per game, single-season: 29 (1967)
  - Total points, single-season: 870 (1967)

NBA

- 6× NBA champion (1971, 1980, 1982, 1985, 1987, 1988)
- 2× NBA Finals MVP (1971, 1985)
- 6× NBA MVP (1971, 1972, 1974, 1976, 1977, 1980)
- 19× NBA All-Star (1970–1977, 1979–1989)
- 15× All-NBA
  - 10× First team (1971–1974, 1976–1977, 1980, 1981, 1984, 1986)
  - 5× Second team (1970, 1978, 1979, 1983, 1985)
- 11× NBA All-Defensive Team
  - 5× First team (1974, 1975, 1979, 1980, 1981)
  - 6× Second team (1970, 1971, 1976, 1977, 1978, 1984)
- NBA Rookie of the Year (1970)
- NBA All-Rookie First Team (1970)
- 2× NBA scoring champion (1971, 1972)
- NBA rebounding leader (1976)
- 4× NBA blocks leader (1975, 1976, 1979, 1980)
- NBA field goal percentage leader (1977)
- Elected to the NBA 35th Anniversary Team
- One of the 50 Greatest Players in NBA History (1996)
- Elected to the NBA 75th Anniversary Team (2021)
- No. 33 retired by Milwaukee Bucks
- No. 33 retired by Los Angeles Lakers
- November 16, 2012 – a statue of Abdul-Jabbar was unveiled in front of Staples Center in Los Angeles

As head coach:

- USBL champion (2002)

As assistant coach:

- 2× NBA champion (2009, 2010)

Media

- 6× Sporting News NBA MVP (1971, 1972, 1974, 1976, 1977, 1980)
- 2× Sam Davis Memorial Award (1971, 1974)
- Sports Illustrated Sportsperson of the Year (1985)
- Sporting News Rookie of the Year (1970)
- Hy Turkin Memorial Award (1970)
- Associated Press NBA 1970s All-Decade First Team
- Academy of Achievement Golden Plate Award (1989)
- Marca Leyenda (2010)
- Sports Illustrated's Muhammad Ali Legacy Award (2016)
- W. E. B. Du Bois Medal (2022)

== Film and television ==
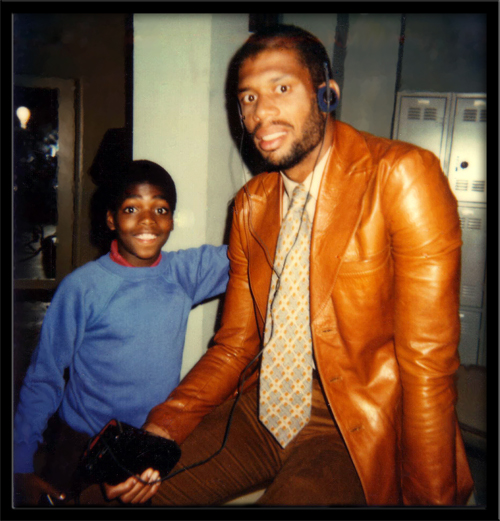
Actor Shavar Ross and Abdul-Jabbar on the set of Diff'rent Strokes, c. 1982

Playing in Los Angeles facilitated Abdul-Jabbar's trying his hand at acting. He made his film debut in Bruce Lee's 1972 film Game of Death.

In 1980, Abdul-Jabbar played co-pilot Roger Murdock in Airplane!, spoofing the appearance of football star Elroy "Crazylegs" Hirsch as an airplane pilot in the 1957 drama that served as the main source of inspiration for Airplane!, Zero Hour!. In Airplane!, there is a scene in which a little boy invited to the cockpit looks at Abdul-Jabbar and remarks that he is in fact Abdul-Jabbar. Staying in character, Abdul-Jabbar states that he is merely Roger Murdock, an airline co-pilot; the boy nevertheless continues to insist that he believes Abdul-Jabbar is "the greatest", but that according to his father he does not "work hard enough on defense" and that he does not "really try, except during the playoffs". This causes Abdul-Jabbar's character to snap and break character: "The hell I don't!" He then grabs the boy and snarls that he has "been hearing that crap ever since I was at UCLA" and is on the court "busting my buns every night." He instructs the boy: "Tell your old man to drag [Bill] Walton and [Bob] Lanier up and down the court for 48 minutes." Later in the film, Murdock loses consciousness and collapses at the controls wearing Abdul-Jabbar's goggles and yellow Lakers shorts. In 2014, Abdul-Jabbar and Airplane! co-star Robert Hays (character Ted Striker) reprised their Airplane! roles in a parody commercial promoting Wisconsin tourism.

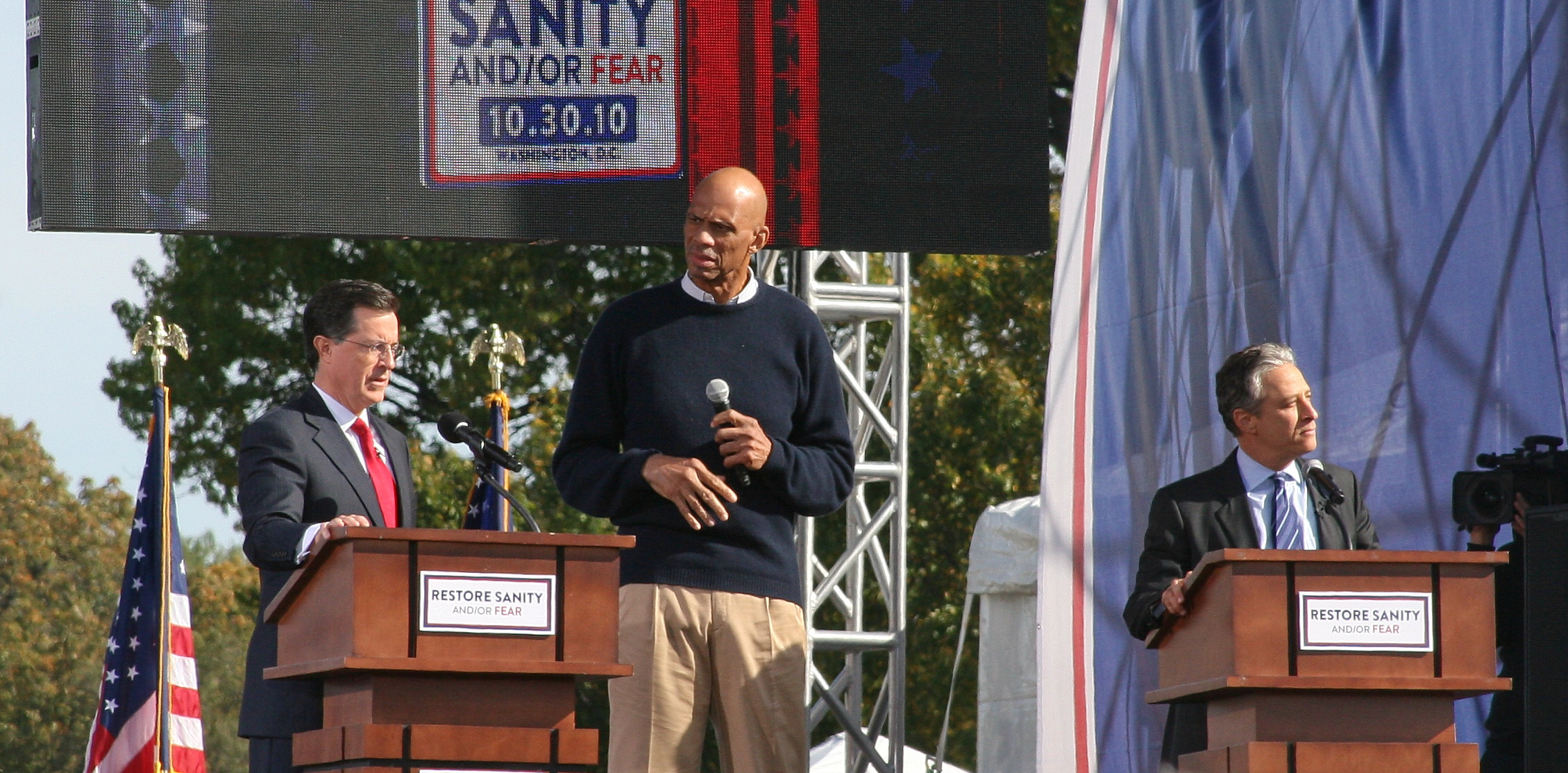
Abdul-Jabbar (center) at the Rally to Restore Sanity and/or Fear with Comedy Central hosts Stephen Colbert and Jon Stewart

Abdul-Jabbar has had numerous other television and film appearances, often playing himself. He has had roles in movies such as Fletch, Troop Beverly Hills and Forget Paris, and television series such as Full House, Living Single, Amen, Everybody Loves Raymond, Martin, Diff'rent Strokes (his height humorously contrasted with that of diminutive child star Gary Coleman), The Fresh Prince of Bel-Air, Scrubs, 21 Jump Street, Emergency!, Man from Atlantis, and New Girl. Abdul-Jabbar played a genie in a lamp in a 1984 episode of Tales from the Darkside. He also played himself on the February 10, 1994, episode of the sketch comedy television series In Living Color.

Abdul-Jabbar appeared in the television version of Stephen King's The Stand, played the Archangel of Basketball in Slam Dunk Ernest, and had a brief non-speaking cameo appearance in BASEketball. Abdul-Jabbar was also the co-executive producer of the 1994 TV film The Vernon Johns Story. He has also made appearances on The Colbert Report in a 2006 skit called "HipHopKetball II: The ReJazzebration Remix '06", and in 2008 as a stage manager who is sent out on a mission to find Nazi gold. Abdul-Jabbar also voiced himself in a 2011 episode of The Simpsons titled "Love Is a Many Strangled Thing". He had a recurring role as himself on the NBC series Guys with Kids, which aired from 2012 to 2013. On Al Jazeera English he expressed his desire to be remembered not just as a player, but also as somebody who used their mind and made other contributions.

Abdul-Jabbar appeared in the music video for "Good Goodbye", a 2017 song by rock band Linkin Park featuring rappers Pusha T and Stormzy. In the video, Abdul-Jabbar plays the role of a warlord or emperor of a dunk contest where Linkin Park lead singer Chester Bennington has to dunk on several people in order to save his own life. In an interview about the video, Bennington said that he believes Abdul-Jabbar is the "greatest [basketball] player of all-time".

In February 2019, he appeared in season 12 episode 16 of The Big Bang Theory, "The D&D Vortex". In 2021, Abdul-Jabbar made a guest appearance as himself in a season 2 episode of Dave. The episode he appeared in was also named after him. Abdul-Jabbar makes a cameo appearance as himself in the 2022 Netflix film Glass Onion: A Knives Out Mystery. In 2023, Abdul-Jabbar appeared as himself in season 7, episode 3 of the Showtime series Billions.

=== Writing ===
In September 2018, Abdul-Jabbar was announced as one of the writers for the July 2019 revival of Veronica Mars.

=== Documentaries ===
On February 10, 2011, Abdul-Jabbar debuted his film On the Shoulders of Giants, documenting the tumultuous journey of the famed yet often-overlooked New York Renaissance professional basketball team, at Science Park High School in Newark, New Jersey. The event was simulcast live throughout the school, city, and state. In 2015, he appeared in Kareem: Minority of One, an HBO documentary on his life. In 2020, Abdul-Jabbar was the executive producer and narrator of the History channel special Black Patriots: Heroes of the Revolution. He was nominated for an Emmy Award for his narration.

=== Reality television ===
Abdul-Jabbar participated in the 2013 ABC reality series Splash, a celebrity diving competition. In April 2018, Abdul-Jabbar competed in the all-athlete season of season 26 of Dancing with the Stars and partnered with professional dancer Lindsay Arnold.

== Writing and activism ==
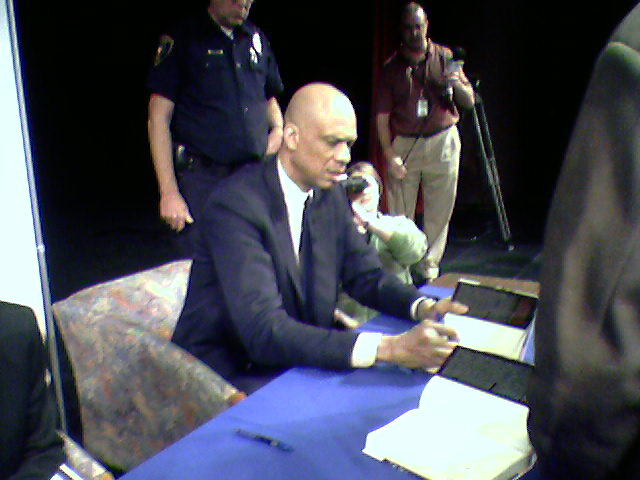
Book signing, 2007

In 1967, Abdul-Jabbar was the only college athlete to attend the Cleveland Summit, a meeting of prominent black athletes who convened in support of Muhammad Ali's refusal to fight in the Vietnam War.

Abdul-Jabbar became a best-selling author and cultural critic. He published several books, mostly on African-American history. His first book, his autobiography Giant Steps, was written in 1983 with co-author Peter Knobler. The book's title is an homage to jazz great John Coltrane, referring to his album Giant Steps. Others include On the Shoulders of Giants: My Journey Through the Harlem Renaissance, co-written with Raymond Obstfeld, and Brothers in Arms: The Epic Story of the 761st Tank Battalion, World War II's Forgotten Heroes, co-written with Anthony Walton, which is a history of the first black armored unit to fight in World War II.

In 2015, Abdul-Jabbar made his adult fiction writing debut with the Victorian mystery novel Mycroft Holmes, based around the titular character from the Sherlock Holmes stories. Two sequels followed: Mycroft and Sherlock (2018) and Mycroft and Sherlock: The Empty Birdcage (2019). All three titles were co-written with Anna Waterhouse.

A regular contributor to discussions about issues of race and religion, among other topics, in national magazines and on television, Abdul-Jabbar has written a regular column for Time. He appeared on Meet the Press on January 25, 2015, to talk about a column saying that Islam should not be blamed for the actions of violent extremists, just as Christianity has not been blamed for the actions of violent extremists who profess Christianity. When asked about being Muslim, he said: "I don't have any misgiving about my faith. I'm very concerned about the people who claim to be Muslims that are murdering people and creating all this mayhem in the world. That is not what Islam is about, and that should not be what people think of when they think about Muslims. But it's up to all of us to do something about all of it."

In November 2014, Abdul-Jabbar published an essay in Jacobin calling for just compensation for college athletes, writing that "in the name of fairness, we must bring an end to the indentured servitude of college athletes and start paying them what they are worth." Commenting on Donald Trump's 2017 travel ban, he condemned it, saying: "The absence of reason and compassion is the very definition of pure evil because it is a rejection of our sacred values, distilled from millennia of struggle."

In 2017, Abdul-Jabbar spoke at an event marking Ramadan organized by the Israeli consul Sam Grundwerg at the Israeli consulate in Los Angeles, stressing the importance of Muslim-Jewish relations and cross-cultural exchange.

In June 2021, he published an essay in Jacobin on the negative impact on public health of those refusing to receive the COVID-19 vaccine, criticizing Kyrie Irving, among others. Abdul-Jabbar began publishing an online newsletter in 2021.

== Government appointments ==
=== Cultural ambassador ===
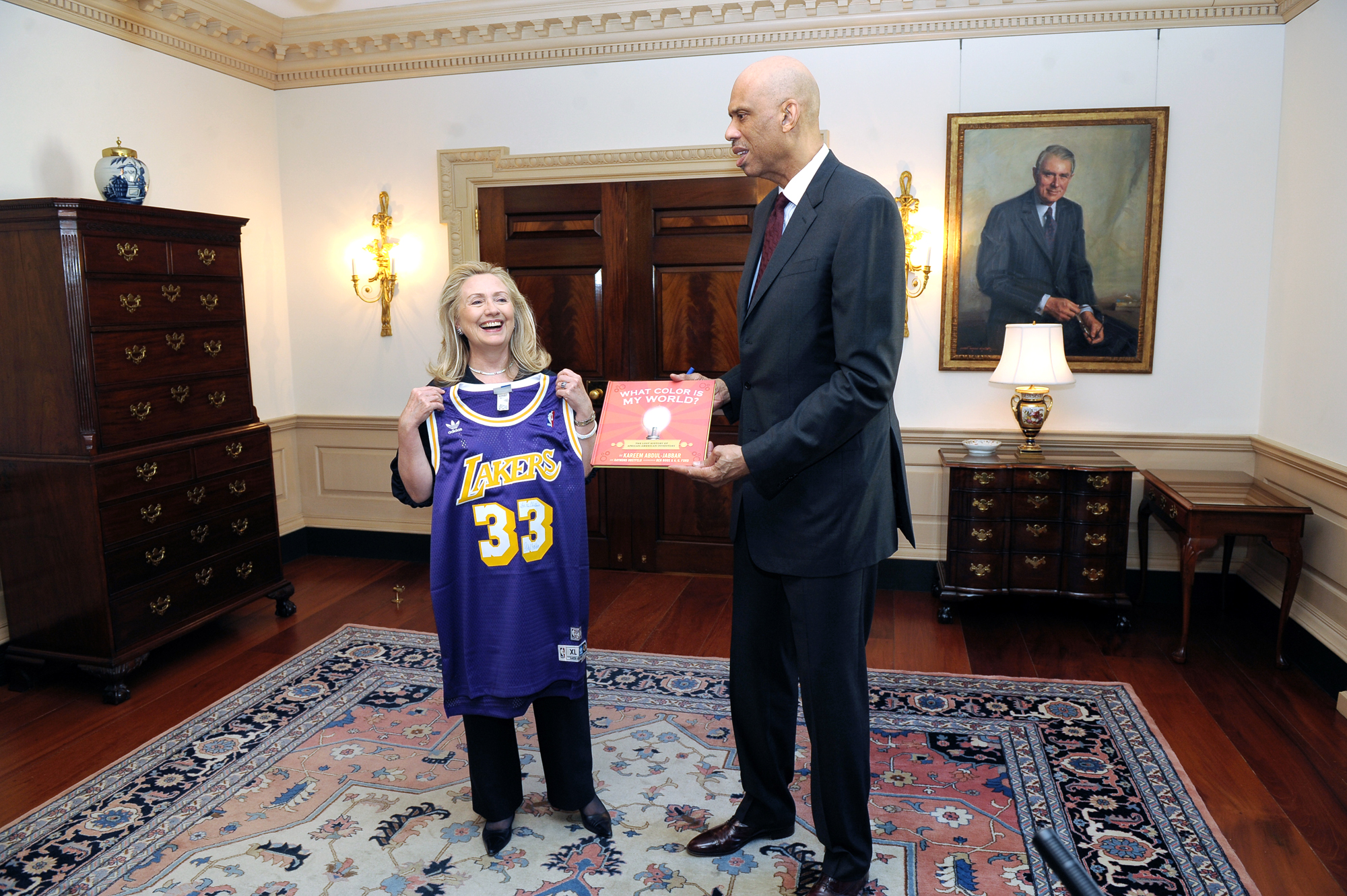
Hillary Clinton and Abdul-Jabbar, 2012

In January 2012, United States Secretary of State Hillary Clinton announced that Abdul-Jabbar had accepted a position as a cultural ambassador for the United States. During the announcement press conference, Abdul-Jabbar commented on the historical legacy of African-Americans as representatives of U.S. culture: "I remember when Louis Armstrong first did it back for President Kennedy, one of my heroes. So it's nice to be following in his footsteps." As part of this role, Abdul-Jabbar traveled to Brazil to promote education for local youths.

=== President's Council on Fitness, Sports, and Nutrition ===
Former President Barack Obama announced in his last days of office that he had appointed Abdul-Jabbar along with Gabby Douglas and Carli Lloyd to the President's Council on Fitness, Sports, and Nutrition.

=== Citizens Coinage Advisory Committee ===
In January 2017, Abdul-Jabbar was appointed to the Citizens Coinage Advisory Committee by United States Secretary of the Treasury Steven Mnuchin. According to the United States Mint, Abdul-Jabbar is a keen coin collector whose interest in the life of Alexander Hamilton had led him into the hobby. He resigned in 2018 due to what the Mint described as "increasing personal obligations".

== Personal life ==
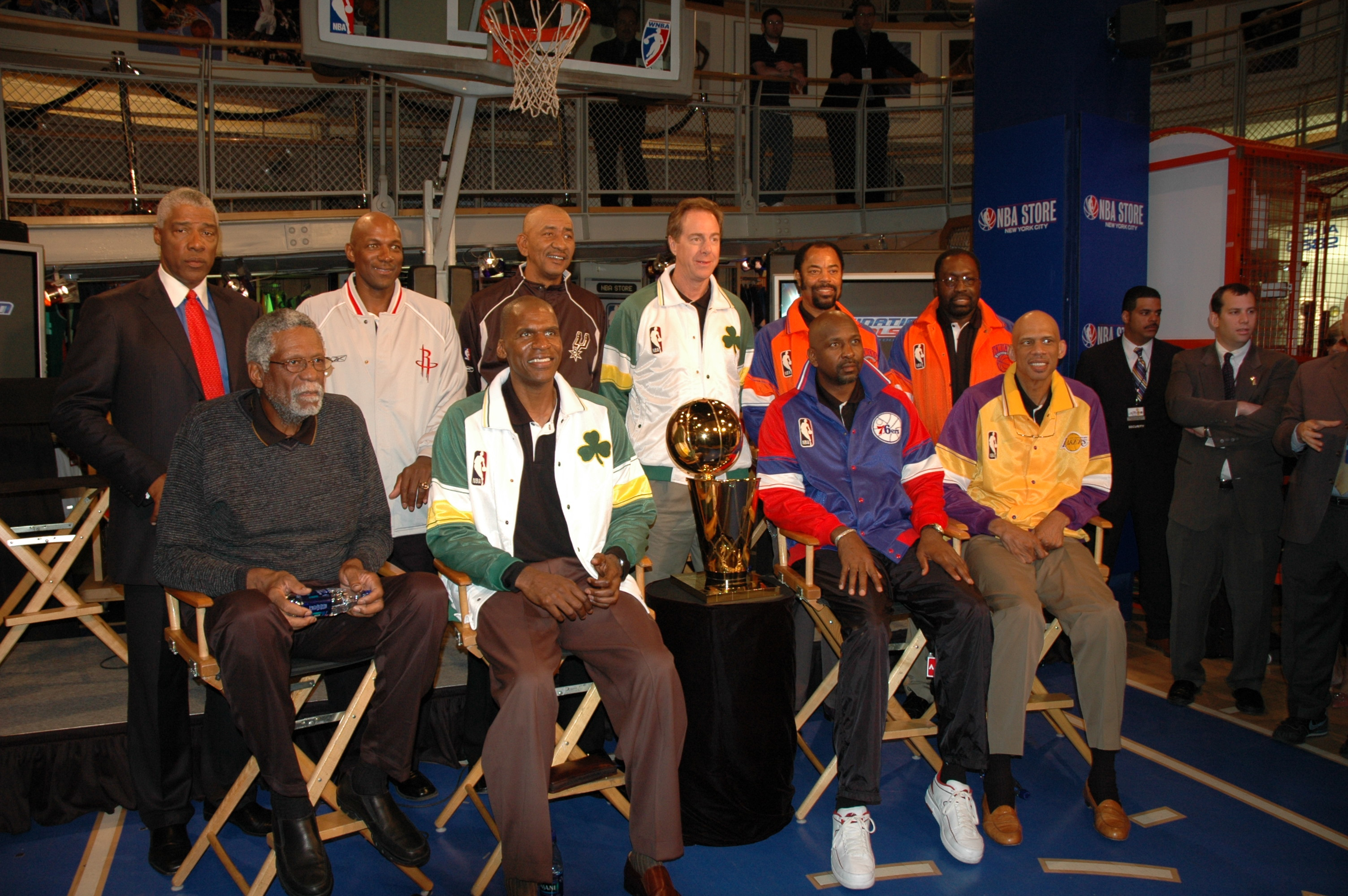
Abdul-Jabbar (below, far right) and other former NBA players visit the New York NBA Store in January 2005

Abdul-Jabbar met Habiba Abdul-Jabbar (born Janice Brown) at a Lakers game during his senior year at UCLA. They married in 1971, and together had three children: daughters Habiba and Sultana and son Kareem Jr., who played basketball at Western Kentucky after attending Valparaiso. Abdul-Jabbar and Janice divorced in 1978. He has another son, Amir, with Cheryl Pistono. Another son, Adam, made an appearance on the TV sitcom Full House with him.

In 1983, Abdul-Jabbar's house burned down. Many of his belongings, including his beloved jazz LP collection of about 3,000 albums, were destroyed. Many Lakers fans sent and brought him albums, which he found uplifting.

In 2016, Abdul-Jabbar performed a tribute to friend Muhammad Ali along with Chance the Rapper.

=== Religion and name ===
Abdul-Jabbar grew up in the Catholic Church, but abandoned the faith when he left his home in New York for UCLA. During the summer of 1968, Abdul-Jabbar took the shahada twice and converted to Sunni Islam. He then took on the name Kareem Abdul-Jabbar, which means "noble one, servant of the Almighty", announcing it in a 1969 issue of Sports Illustrated. At age 24 in 1971, he legally became Kareem Abdul-Jabbar. He was named by Hamaas Abdul Khaalis of the Hanafi Movement which split from the Nation of Islam. Abdul-Jabbar purchased and donated 7700 16th Street NW, a house in Washington, D.C., for Khaalis to use as the Hanafi Madh-Hab Center; a few years later, the location would become the place of the 1973 Hanafi Muslim massacre. Eventually, Kareem "found that [he] disagreed with some of Hamaas' teachings about the Quran, and [they] parted ways." In 1973, Abdul-Jabbar embarked on a pilgrimage to Libya and Saudi Arabia with the goal of learning enough Arabic for self-study of the Quran, and he "emerged from this pilgrimage with [his] beliefs clarified and [his] faith renewed". Abdul-Jabbar was also heavily influenced by Malcolm X, a leader of the Nation of Islam. Abdul-Jabbar was invited to join the group, but he declined.

Abdul-Jabbar has spoken about the thinking that was behind his name change when he converted to Islam. He stated that he was "latching on to something that was part of my heritage, because many of the slaves who were brought here were Muslims. My family was brought to America by a French planter named Alcindor, who came here from Trinidad in the 18th century. My people were Yoruba, and their culture survived slavery ... My father found out about that when I was a kid, and it gave me all I needed to know that, hey, I was somebody, even if nobody else knew about it. When I was a kid, no one would believe anything positive that you could say about black people. And that's a terrible burden on black people, because they don't have an accurate idea of their history, which has been either suppressed or distorted." His name change further eroded his public image in the United States, mostly in white areas.

In 1998, Abdul-Jabbar reached a settlement after he sued Miami Dolphins running back Karim Abdul-Jabbar (now Abdul-Karim al-Jabbar, born Sharmon Shah) because he felt Karim was profiting off the name he made famous by having the Abdul-Jabbar moniker and number 33 on his Dolphins jersey. As a result, the younger Abdul-Jabbar had to change his jersey nameplate to "Abdul" while playing for the Dolphins. The football player had also been an athlete at UCLA.

=== Health problems ===
Abdul-Jabbar suffers from migraines, and his use of cannabis to reduce the symptoms has had legal ramifications. In November 2009, Abdul-Jabbar announced that he was suffering from a form of leukemia, Philadelphia chromosome-positive chronic myeloid leukemia, a cancer of the blood and bone marrow. The disease was diagnosed in December 2008, but Abdul-Jabbar said his condition could be managed by taking oral medication daily, seeing his specialist every other month, and having his blood analyzed regularly. He expressed in a 2009 press conference that he did not believe the illness would stop him from leading a normal life. Abdul-Jabbar is a spokesman for Novartis, the company that produces Gleevec, his cancer medication.

In February 2011, Abdul-Jabbar announced via Twitter that his leukemia was gone and he was "100% cancer free". A few days later, he clarified his misstatement: "You're never really cancer-free and I should have known that. My cancer right now is at an absolute minimum." In April 2015, Abdul-Jabbar was admitted to the hospital when he was diagnosed with cardiovascular disease. Later that week, on his 68th birthday, he underwent quadruple coronary bypass surgery at the UCLA Medical Center.

In 2020, Abdul-Jabbar revealed that he had been diagnosed with prostate cancer eleven years earlier.

In February 2023, he spoke out about his atrial fibrillation diagnosis. He partnered with Bristol Myers Squibb and Pfizer's "No Time to Wait" to raise awareness of the symptoms of the irregular and rapid heart rhythm condition which increase the risk of stroke. In December 2023, he was hospitalized after he fell and broke his hip while attending a concert.

=== Non-athletic honors ===
In 2011, Abdul-Jabbar was awarded the Double Helix Medal for his work in raising awareness for cancer research. Also in 2011, he received an honorary degree from New York Institute of Technology. In 2016, he was awarded the Presidential Medal of Freedom by outgoing U.S. President Barack Obama. In 2020, Abdul-Jabbar was nominated for the Primetime Emmy Award for Outstanding Narrator for his work on the documentary special Black Patriots: Heroes of The Revolution. After receiving an honorary degree from the same, he was named Harvard College Class Day speaker in 2025.

== Works ==
=== Books ===
- Abdul-Jabbar, Kareem; Knobler, Peter (1983). Giant Steps. New York: Bantam Books. ISBN 0553050443.
- Kareem, with Mignon McCarthy (1990) ISBN 0-394-55927-4.
- Selected from Giant Steps (Writers' Voices) (1999) ISBN 0-7857-9912-5.
- Black Profiles in Courage: A Legacy of African-American Achievement, with Alan Steinberg (1996) ISBN 0-688-13097-6.
- A Season on the Reservation: My Sojourn with the White Mountain Apaches, with Stephen Singular (2000) ISBN 0-688-17077-3.
- Brothers in Arms: The Epic Story of the 761st Tank Battalion, World War II's Forgotten Heroes with Anthony Walton (2004) ISBN 978-0-7679-0913-6.
- On the Shoulders of Giants: My Journey Through the Harlem Renaissance with Raymond Obstfeld (2007) ISBN 978-1-4165-3488-4.
- What Color Is My World? The Lost History of African American Inventors with Raymond Obstfeld (2012) ISBN 978-0-7636-4564-9.
- Streetball Crew Book One Sasquatch in the Paint with Raymond Obstfeld (2013) ISBN 978-1-4231-7870-5.
- Streetball Crew Book Two Stealing the Game with Raymond Obstfeld (2015) ISBN 978-1423178712.
- Mycroft Holmes with Anna Waterhouse (September 2015) ISBN 978-1-7832-9153-3.
- Writings on the Wall: Searching for a New Equality Beyond Black and White with Raymond Obstfeld (2016) ISBN 978-1-6189-3171-9.
- Coach Wooden and Me: Our 50-Year Friendship On and Off the Court (2017) ISBN 978-1538760468.
- Becoming Kareem: Growing Up On and Off the Court (2017) ISBN 978-0316555388.
- Abdul-Jabbar, Kareem; Obstfeld, Raymond; Cassara, Joshua; Guerrero, Luis; Bowland, Simon (2017). Mycroft Holmes and The Apocalypse Handbook. London: Titan Comics. ISBN 978-1-78585-300-5.
- Mycroft and Sherlock with Anna Waterhouse (October 9, 2018) ISBN 978-1785659256.
- Mycroft and Sherlock: The Empty Birdcage with Anna Waterhouse (September 24, 2019) ISBN 978-1785659300.
- Champion: A Graphic Novel. with Ray Obstfeld and Illustrated by Ed Laroche. September 2, 2025. ISBN 978-0593835753.

=== Audio books ===
- On the Shoulders of Giants: An Audio Journey Through the Harlem Renaissance 8-CD Set Vol. 1–4, with Avery Brooks, Jesse L. Martin, Maya Angelou, Herbie Hancock, Billy Crystal, Charles Barkley, James Worthy, Julius Erving, Jerry West, Clyde Drexler, Bill Russell, Coach John Wooden, Stanley Crouch, Quincy Jones and other chart-topping musicians, as well as legendary actors and performers such as Samuel L. Jackson. (2008) ISBN 978-0-615-18301-5
