= Giant Steps (book) =

1983 book by Kareem Abdul-Jabbar

Giant Steps: The Autobiography of Kareem Abdul-Jabbar
- Author: Kareem Abdul-Jabbar; Peter Knobler
- Language: English
- Genre: Autobiography
- Publisher: Bantam Books
- Publication date: 1983
- Publication place: United States

Giant Steps: The Autobiography of Kareem Abdul-Jabbar (Bantam Books, 1983) is a best-selling book by basketball player Kareem Abdul-Jabbar. Written with former Crawdaddy magazine editor Peter Knobler, it covers Abdul-Jabbar's career, his conversion to Islam, his social growth, and his feelings about American racial politics. The title Giant Steps pays tribute to the 1960 album of the same name by jazz musician John Coltrane.
