= Mycroft Holmes (novel) =

Mystery novel by Kareem Abdul-Jabbar and Anna Waterhouse

- First edition
- Author: Kareem Abdul-Jabbar; Anna Waterhouse
- Language: English
- Genre: Mystery novels
- Publisher: Titan Books
- Publication date: 2015
- Media type: Print (hardback)
- ISBN: 978-1783291533 (first U.S. edition, hardback)
- Followed by: Mycroft and Sherlock

Mycroft Holmes is a mystery novel by Kareem Abdul-Jabbar and Anna Waterhouse. It involves Sir Arthur Conan Doyle's character of Mycroft Holmes, the older brother of Sherlock Holmes, solving a mystery early in his career as a government official. It is Abdul-Jabbar's first adult novel.

== Plot ==
Mycroft Holmes, secretary to Secretary of State for War Edward Cardwell, and his best friend Cyrus Douglas learn of disturbing reports from Douglas's birthplace Trinidad; stories of children gone missing, Douen, and Lougarou. Holmes's fiancée, Georgiana Sutton, was also raised in Trinidad and the stories terrify her enough to return home and seek answers. Holmes and Douglas follow her to the island and are confronted with dark mysteries.

== Publication history ==
Having been a fan of the original Sherlock Holmes stories as a child, Abdul-Jabbar specifically chose to write about Mycroft as he felt that there was already an abundance of Sherlock Holmes pastiches. Reading Michael P. Hodel and Sean M. Wright's Enter the Lion: A Posthumous Memoir of Mycroft Holmes caused Abdul-Jabbar to realize "more could be done with this 'older, smarter' character and his window on to the highest levels of British government—at a time when Britain was the most powerful country in the world." In choosing to write about Mycroft, Abdul-Jabbar diverged somewhat from Conan Doyle's version.

I wanted him to be the opposite of what's implied about him in the stories, that he's a brilliant but bloated, officious bureaucrat. Remember, it's Sherlock who describes him and Sherlock is not always a reliable source. He has his moments of pettiness. Most important, I wanted the opposite of Sherlock's social personality. Like Sherlock, Mycroft is damaged in the ways that only people of such towering intellect can be, but he handles it by engaging in gambling, women, and indulging himself.

== Reception ==
Christopher Farnsworth writing for the Los Angeles Times said "Abdul-Jabbar and Waterhouse have created a smart origin story for Mycroft that slots neatly onto the shelves next to the original canon, but also reveals some harsh truths that Doyle probably never considered." Mike Sager writing for Esquire said "The briskly written book has a delicately woven plot, bringing together such diverse elements as Trinidadian culture and folklore, the tobacco importation business in London, and a villain's elaborate scheme to bring slavery back to the Caribbean—along with the usual Holmesian array of brightly obtuse knowledge and libertine philosophy." Amy Thomas, writing for Baker Street Babes, said "The book is extremely well written and well researched, with layers of sensory detail and filmic tableaux that reflect Waterhouse's screenwriting influence. Doylean Easter Eggs are also sprinkled throughout and are presented with a witty subtlety that will delight longtime fans. Ultimately, Mycroft Holmes is a good book and an engaging mystery for Sherlockians and non-Sherlockians alike, but it's a particular delight for aficionados of the Doylean world."

== Sequels ==
- With Raymond Obstfeld, Abdul-Jabbar authored the graphic novel Mycroft Holmes and the Apocalypse Handbook in 2016.
- Abdul-Jabbar, partnered again with Anna Waterhouse, authored Mycroft and Sherlock in 2018. and Mycroft and Sherlock: The Empty Birdcage in 2019.
