= Mycroft and Sherlock =

2018 novel by Abdul-Jabbar and Waterhouse

- First edition
- Author: Kareem Abdul-Jabbar; Anna Waterhouse
- Language: English
- Genre: Mystery novels
- Publisher: Titan Books
- Publication date: 2018
- Media type: Print (hardback)
- ISBN: 978-1785659256 (first U.S. edition, hardback)
- Preceded by: Mycroft Holmes
- Followed by: Mycroft and Sherlock: The Empty Birdcage

Mycroft and Sherlock is a mystery novel by Kareem Abdul-Jabbar and Anna Waterhouse. It is the second novel in their "Mycroft Holmes" series utilizing Sir Arthur Conan Doyle's characters of Mycroft and Sherlock Holmes. Having focused solely on Mycroft in the first novel, Abdul-Jabbar and Waterhouse were curious about the relationship between Mycroft and his brother and recognized that the sequel would need the introduction of Sherlock.

In an interview with Lyndsay Faye, Abdul-Jabbar described the writing process noting that he is a "history aficionado" while Waterhouse is more interested in research. Abdul-Jabbar also stated that plot was more of interest to him while Waterhouse was more drawn to dialogue.

== Plot ==
Mycroft Holmes and Cyrus Douglas, of whom the latter now runs a school for boys, are joined by Mycroft's younger brother Sherlock to investigate a series of killings dubbed "the Savage Gardens murders."

== Reception ==
Kirkus Reviews was positive about the novel while conceding "The mystery, as so often in Conan Doyle, is less interesting than the Holmes-ian byplay." Michael Dirda of The Washington Post praised the book saying the story moves "briskly" and calling it "diverting, light entertainment" while noting "Enjoyable as the book is, a purist will nonetheless fault its loose construction." Both BookPage and New York Journal of Books gave positive notices of the book.
