= Mycroft Holmes =

Fictional character by Arthur Conan Doyle

- Sherlock Holmes character
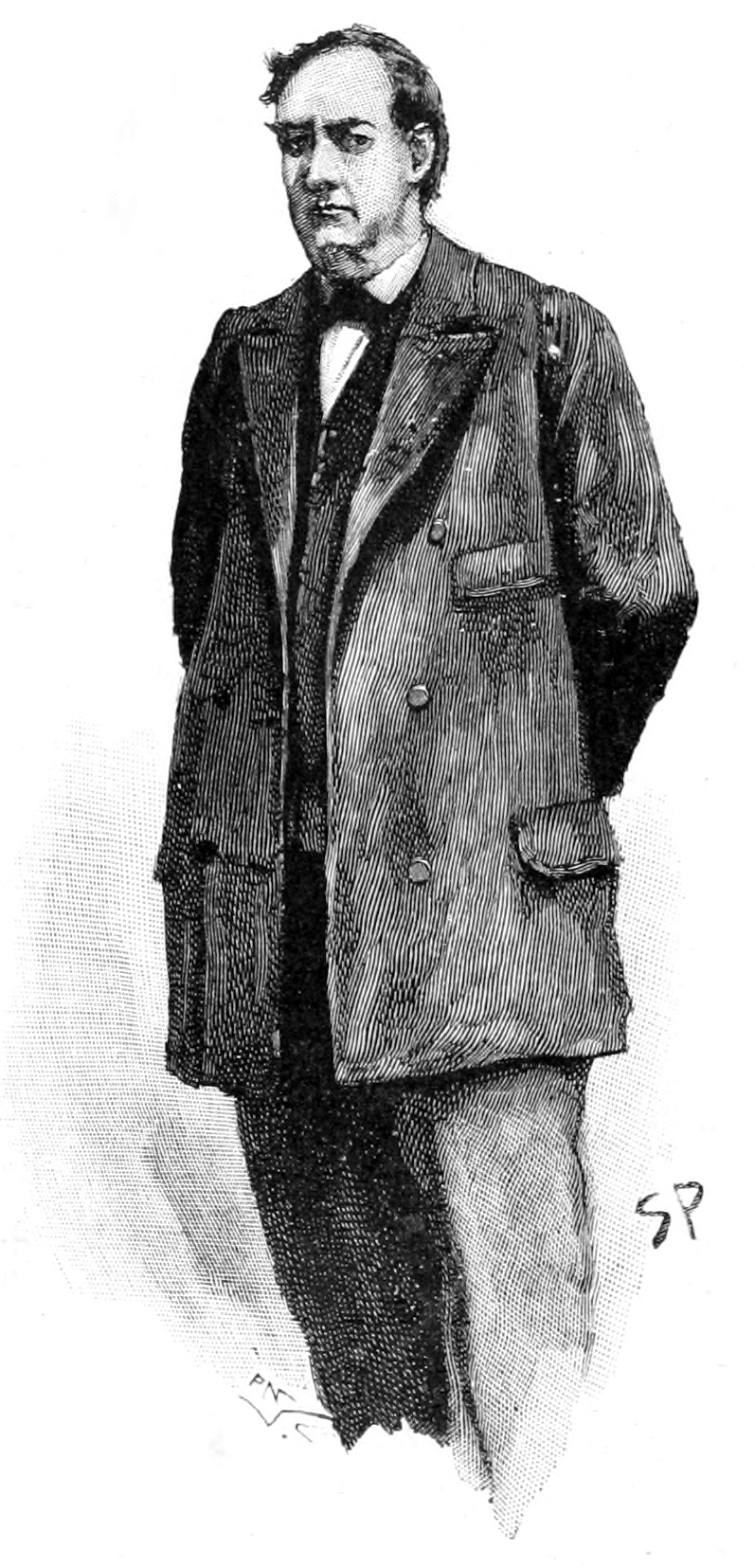
- Mycroft as depicted by Sidney Paget in the Strand Magazine in 1893
- First appearance: "The Adventure of the Greek Interpreter" (1893)
- Last appearance: "The Adventure of the Bruce-Partington Plans" (1908)
- Created by: Arthur Conan Doyle

In-universe information
- Gender: Male
- Occupation: Government official
- Family: Sherlock Holmes (brother)
- Nationality: British

Mycroft Holmes is a fictional character appearing in stories written by Sir Arthur Conan Doyle from 1893 to 1908. The elder brother (by seven years) of detective Sherlock Holmes, he is a government official and a founding member of the Diogenes Club. Mycroft is described as having abilities of deduction and knowledge exceeding even those of his brother, though their practical use is limited by his dislike of fieldwork.

== Fictional character biography ==
=== History and occupation ===
Mycroft Holmes is Sherlock Holmes's older brother. He mainly appears in two stories by Doyle, "The Adventure of the Greek Interpreter" and "The Adventure of the Bruce-Partington Plans". He also appears briefly in "The Final Problem", and is mentioned in "The Adventure of the Empty House".

He first appears in "The Greek Interpreter", in which he brings Sherlock a case involving one of his neighbours. Sherlock Holmes tells Dr. Watson that Mycroft has powers of observation and deduction superior to his own, but is not energetic or ambitious, nor does he have the capacity to prepare a case for trial. He also says that some of his most interesting cases have come to him through Mycroft. In the story, Sherlock Holmes and Dr. Watson visit Mycroft at the Diogenes Club, which Mycroft co-founded. Mycroft also visits 221B Baker Street.

Mycroft makes a brief appearance in "The Final Problem". Sherlock Holmes gives Dr. Watson instructions to take a certain route to leave London to avoid Moriarty's gang, and part of this plan involves a ride in a brougham driven by a cloaked driver. Watson sees the coachman and does not recognise him. Sherlock later tells Watson that the driver was Mycroft. Near the end of the story after Sherlock's supposed death, Watson reads a letter left by Sherlock, which includes the statement, "I made every disposition of my property before leaving England, and handed it to my brother Mycroft."

In "The Empty House", it is revealed that Sherlock Holmes faked his death in "The Final Problem" and subsequently went abroad. His only confidant during this time was Mycroft, who provided him with the money he needed. When Sherlock returned to London, he found that Mycroft had preserved his Baker Street rooms and his papers "exactly as they had always been".

In "The Bruce-Partington Plans", Mycroft goes to Baker Street to speak with his brother about recovering missing submarine plans for the government. Sherlock Holmes says in this story that Mycroft only visited 221B Baker Street once before. Though Sherlock initially told Watson in "The Greek Interpreter" that Mycroft audits books for the British government, he reveals to Watson in "The Bruce-Partington Plans" that Mycroft's true role is more substantial:

"I did not know you quite so well in those days. One has to be discreet when one talks of high matters of state. You are right in thinking that he is under the British government. You would also be right in a sense if you said that occasionally he is the British government."

Mycroft has a unique position in the government, which is not named in the stories. Sherlock comments regarding Mycroft's role that there "has never been anything like it before, nor will be again" and that Mycroft "has the tidiest and most orderly brain, with the greatest capacity for storing facts, of any man living". He describes Mycroft's position:

"The conclusions of every department are passed to him, and he is the central exchange, the clearinghouse, which makes out the balance. All other men are specialists, but his specialism is omniscience. We will suppose that a minister needs information as to a point which involves the Navy, India, Canada and the bimetallic question; he could get his separate advices from various departments upon each, but only Mycroft can focus them all, and say offhand how each factor would affect the other. They began by using him as a short-cut, a convenience; now he has made himself an essential. In that great brain of his everything is pigeon-holed and can be handed out in an instant."

He adds to this that Mycroft thinks of nothing other than government policy, except when he asks Mycroft to advise him on one of his cases.

Several Holmesian scholars have proposed theories about Mycroft, though none of these are confirmed in the stories. In "The Adventure of Black Peter", Dr. Watson records that Sherlock Holmes could assume various disguises in "at least five small refuges" which he had in different parts of London; Vincent Starrett wrote that Mycroft's residence "would certainly be one of them". Ronald A. Knox suggested that Mycroft was a double agent who assisted both Sherlock and Professor Moriarty, with the goal of ultimately betraying Moriarty and members of his gang, including Colonel Moran. June Thomson theorised that Mycroft nominated Sherlock to infiltrate the German spy ring in "His Last Bow" (set in 1914) and might have persuaded Sherlock to come out of retirement. Thomson calculated that Mycroft would have retired himself in 1912 at the age of sixty-five years old, but would have maintained his connections with former colleagues in the government.

=== Personality and habits ===
Possessing deductive powers exceeding even those of his younger brother, Mycroft is nevertheless unsuitable for performing detective work as he is unwilling to put in the physical effort necessary to bring cases to their conclusions. In "The Adventure of the Greek Interpreter", Sherlock Holmes says:

"...he has no ambition and no energy. He will not even go out of his way to verify his own solutions, and would rather be considered wrong than take the trouble to prove himself right. Again and again I have taken a problem to him, and have received an explanation which has afterwards proved to be the correct one. And yet he was absolutely incapable of working out the practical points..."

Mycroft does not have ambitions of any kind, according to Sherlock. Despite being "the most indispensable man in the country", as Sherlock says, Mycroft remains a subordinate, will receive "neither honour nor title", and his relatively modest annual salary in "The Bruce-Partington Plans" (which takes place in 1895) is £450 (equivalent to £51,000 in 2025).

He lives in rooms in Pall Mall. His regular routine is to walk around the corner each morning to Whitehall where he works, and in the evening, to walk back to Pall Mall. He then stays at the Diogenes Club, which is located across from his lodgings in Pall Mall, from quarter to five until twenty to eight. He seldom breaks this routine or goes anywhere except these three locations.

Mycroft reads Watson's accounts of Sherlock's adventures and takes an interest in Sherlock's cases. In "The Greek Interpreter", he takes snuff from a tortoise-shell box while at the Diogenes Club, and brushes the grains from his coat with a large, red silk handkerchief. He is also seen "sitting smoking in the armchair" at Baker Street. Mycroft is occasionally referred to by Sherlock Holmes as "Brother Mycroft" in "The Bruce-Partington Plans". He is the only character to refer to Sherlock exclusively by his first name.

=== Appearance and age ===
Mycroft resembles his brother Sherlock Holmes, but is described in "The Greek Interpreter" as being "a much larger and stouter man". According to Watson, Mycroft's eyes are "a peculiarly light, watery grey" and always have "that far-away, introspective look" which Watson had only seen in Sherlock's when he exerted his full powers (Sherlock also has grey eyes.) In "The Final Problem", Sherlock informs Watson that the driver of the brougham (later revealed to be Mycroft) will wear "a heavy black cloak tipped at the collar with red". When Watson sees the coachman, he describes him as "a very massive driver wrapped in a dark cloak". In "The Bruce-Partington Plans", Watson states that Mycroft is "tall and portly", and gives the following description of him:

Heavily built and massive, there was a suggestion of uncouth physical inertia in the figure, but above this unwieldy frame there was perched a head so masterful in its brow, so alert in its steel-grey, deep-set eyes, so firm in its lips, and so subtle in its play of expression, that after the first glance one forgot the gross body and remembered only the dominant mind.

Mycroft is seven years older than Sherlock. According to Leslie S. Klinger, Mycroft was born in 1847. A reference in the short story "His Last Bow", which takes place in 1914, suggests that Sherlock is sixty years old at the time. This would make the year of Sherlock's birth approximately 1854, and thus Mycroft's approximately 1847.

== Adaptations ==
Mycroft Holmes has been portrayed many times in adaptations of the Holmes stories in film, television, radio, and other media.

=== Audio ===
- Episodes adapted from the stories in which Mycroft appears, "The Bruce-Partington Plans" and "The Greek Interpreter", both aired in The Adventures of Sherlock Holmes in 1931, and in The New Adventures of Sherlock Holmes in 1939 and 1940 respectively, as well as both in 1943 in the same series. No cast listing currently exists to show who portrayed Mycroft in these episodes. Rex Evans played Mycroft in at least two episodes of The New Adventures of Sherlock Holmes, which were broadcast in 1945 and 1946 respectively, with Basil Rathbone as Holmes and Nigel Bruce as Dr. Watson.
- In the 1950s radio series starring John Gielgud as Sherlock Holmes, Gielgud's own brother, Val Gielgud, played the part in "The Bruce-Partington Plans".
- In the BBC radio dramatisations with Carleton Hobbs and Norman Shelley, Mycroft was played at various times by Malcolm Graeme, Keith Williams, Felix Felton, and, in "The Empty House", by Carleton Hobbs himself.
- In the BBC Radio adaptations starring Clive Merrison as Sherlock and Michael Williams as Watson, John Hartley played Mycroft in "The Greek Interpreter" on 21 October 1992, "The Bruce-Partington Plans" on 24 January 1994, and "The Retired Colourman" on 29 March 1995. Mycroft, voiced by James Laurenson, also appears in a two-part episode of the BBC radio series The Further Adventures of Sherlock Holmes, again with Clive Merrison as Sherlock Holmes.
- Mycroft is a recurring character in the American radio series The Further Adventures of Sherlock Holmes.
- In 2026, Thomas Mitchells voiced Mycroft in the Sherlock & Co. podcast, in the adaptation of "The Adventure of the Greek Interpreter". Mycroft is also described as having lent a helping hand in the podcast's version of "The Adventure of the Six Napoleons" which is why the cast are sent to Greece under the guise of a holiday. In contrast to the original canon, this Mycroft is presented as a spy who is highly active in the field.

=== Film ===
- The first film appearance of Mycroft Holmes was in the 1922 short film The Bruce Partington Plans in the Stoll film series, where he was played by Lewis Gilbert.
- In the 1965 film A Study in Terror, Mycroft is played by Robert Morley.
- In the Billy Wilder-directed film The Private Life of Sherlock Holmes (1970), Mycroft was played by Christopher Lee.
- The 1975 film The Adventure of Sherlock Holmes' Smarter Brother mentions Mycroft in its introduction, who appears only in a childhood picture; Mycroft's mention sets up the introduction of a third, younger brother (not present in Doyle's original stories), Sigerson Holmes (played by Gene Wilder), who is of comparable talent but receives far less credit.
- Charles Gray assumed the character in both the 1976 film The Seven-Per-Cent Solution and Granada Television's Sherlock Holmes series.
- Peter Jeffrey played Mycroft in the 1990 film Hands of a Murderer.
- Stephen Fry played Mycroft in the Guy Ritchie-directed Sherlock Holmes: A Game of Shadows, released in December 2011.
- Hugh Laurie played Mycroft in the Will Ferrell comedy movie Holmes & Watson, released in 2018.
- Sam Claflin played Mycroft in the movie Enola Holmes, released in September 2022.

=== Television ===
- The BBC broadcast two Sherlock Holmes series in 1965 and 1968 which starred Douglas Wilmer (1965) and Peter Cushing (1968) as Sherlock and Nigel Stock as Watson. Mycroft appeared twice, once in 1965 in "The Bruce-Partington Plans" and played by Derek Francis and in 1968 in "The Greek Interpreter" and played by Ronald Adam.
- Boris Klyuyev played Mycroft Holmes in The Adventures of Sherlock Holmes and Dr. Watson (1979–1986), a Soviet television film series. Klyuyev was nine years younger than Vasily Livanov, who played Sherlock Holmes. According to Sherlock, Mycroft is married and has a son.
- Charles Gray, who played Mycroft in the film The Seven-Per-Cent Solution (1976), also played the character in four episodes of Granada Television's Sherlock Holmes series in the late 1980s and early 1990s. Gray's first two television appearances were adaptations of the two stories in which Mycroft actually appears ("The Greek Interpreter" and "The Bruce-Partington Plans"). In the two other appearances, the character was used to replace another for various reasons. In "The Golden Pince-Nez", Mycroft was used in place of Watson, since Edward Hardwicke was unavailable due to a prior commitment to appear in Shadowlands. In "The Mazarin Stone", Mycroft was used in place of Sherlock owing to Jeremy Brett's ill health.
- A direct female descendant named Mycroft Holmes is introduced in the BraveStarr episode "Sherlock Holmes in the 23rd Century" (1988) as an agent of Scotland Yard and an ally of her ancestor.
- Jerome Willis played Mycroft in Sherlock Holmes and the Leading Lady, a 1991 made-for-TV film which starred Christopher Lee as Holmes and Patrick Macnee as Watson.
- R. H. Thomson played Mycroft in the 2001 made-for-TV film The Royal Scandal opposite Matt Frewer's Sherlock.
- Richard E. Grant played Mycroft in Sherlock: Case of Evil (2002). In the television film, Mycroft was injected with an unidentified substance by Moriarty many years before the film takes place, which left Mycroft disabled and dependent on leg braces and walking sticks. It is not explained further in the film why or how this occurred.
- In the 2010 BBC television series Sherlock, Mycroft is portrayed by series co-creator Mark Gatiss. In this contemporary version, Sherlock and Mycroft exhibit smouldering animosity towards each other (which Dr. Watson characterises as "sibling rivalry" and Mycroft himself refers to as a "childish feud"). Mycroft is part of the Cabinet Office and is so powerful that he can use mass surveillance to track Sherlock. In keeping with the books, Mycroft describes himself as "occupying a small position in the British government", but more accurately, "he is the British government". While Sherlock goes so far as to suggest that they would both be willing to arrange the death of the other, Mycroft gradually reveals a well-hidden deep familial love for his brother, something Sherlock, in time, begins to reciprocate. In the 2015 Christmas Special "The Abominable Bride", he is portrayed by Gatiss in heavy makeup as morbidly obese, more in keeping with the original stories.
- Rhys Ifans played Mycroft Holmes in another modern adaptation, Elementary (2012–2019). In this series, Mycroft is introduced as a London restaurateur who later turns out to work for MI6 as a source due to his restaurants being used as a front for various crime organisations. Mycroft goes into hiding at the end of the second season when he exposed his ties to MI6 to help Sherlock with a case, which Holmes feels reflected a lack of trust in him to find another solution. In the sixth-season episode "Nobody Lives Forever", it is revealed that Mycroft died ten months prior to the events of that episode of a brain haemorrhage, which Sherlock was never informed about until he started digging.
- Jonjo O'Neill played Mycroft in The Irregulars (2021), where he is a member of the Hermetic Order of the Golden Dawn, and leads a government department that researches the paranormal.
- Vincent Gale played Mycroft Holmes in Watson (2025–2026), a modern adaptation focusing on Dr. Watson's medical career after Sherlock's presumed death. Watson alludes to previously crossing paths with Mycroft and reveals that Mycroft is extremely reclusive due to secret government activities. Shinwell Johnson is tasked with contacting Mycroft at the Diogenes Club in England in order to obtain a sample of Sherlock's DNA in order to determine whether Irene Adler's son is biologically related to Sherlock. Mycroft provides the sample to Shinwell, adding if Irene is lying, he wishes to know in order to make her life very difficult. In the second season, he returns and threatens to cease funding Watson's clinic in retaliation for Sherlock having previously sabotaged Mycroft's tech company.
- Max Irons played Mycroft in the 2026 television show Young Sherlock.

=== Novels and short stories ===
The character has been used many times in works that are not adaptations of Holmes stories:

- American former basketball player Kareem Abdul-Jabbar and Anna Waterhouse authored Mycroft Holmes, released September 2015, as well as two sequels entitled Mycroft and Sherlock, published in 2018 and Mycroft and Sherlock: The Empty Birdcage, published in 2019.
- He was the main character in a series of mystery novels by the author Quinn Fawcett beginning with Against the Brotherhood: A Mycroft Holmes Novel.
- A young Mycroft Holmes is the protagonist of a mystery-adventure "edited" by Michael P. Hodel and Sean M. Wright, Enter the Lion: A Posthumous Memoir of Mycroft Holmes (published in hardcover by Hawthorn Books in 1979 in the U.S. and by JM Dent & Sons Ltd. in 1980 in London and in paperback by Playboy Press in 1980). The action takes place in 1875, ten years after the end of the American Civil War, at the time when Mycroft Holmes was a minor official in the Foreign Office. Mycroft is aided by his younger brother Sherlock, Victor Trevor (who appears in Doyle's tale "The Adventure of the Gloria Scott"), and an adventurer known as "Captain Jericho", a mysterious former slave. They band together in an effort to prevent an attempt by former Confederate officers to involve the British government in a scheme to overthrow the United States government. The story also provides an explanation of the antagonism between Sherlock Holmes and Professor Moriarty.
- Mycroft has a small but important role in Ray Walsh's novel The Mycroft Memoranda, published in London by Andre Deutsch, 1984 (ISBN 0-233-97582-9), in which Sherlock Holmes, at the request of Major Henry Smith, Acting Commissioner for the City of London, becomes involved in the hunt for Jack the Ripper.
- The Dorking Gap Affair by Glen Petrie published February 1, 1990 by Bantam (first published 1989) ISBN 9780593016961.
- The Monstrous Regiment by Glen Petrie published by Bantam. Glen Petrie was commissioned by Transworld to publish a series of 10 books on Mycroft Holmes. He was paid but Transworld was sold and the books were not finished.
- Mycroft features in Neil Gaiman's short story "The Case of Death and Honey", collected in Trigger Warning. Dying, he summons his brother for a final meeting and presents him with an intriguing case to solve.
- The protagonist of The Moon is a Harsh Mistress by Robert A. Heinlein names his self-aware computer "Mycroft Holmes".

=== Comics ===
- Mycroft is depicted as a violent psychopath in 2000 AD (Canon Fodder, issues #861–867) by Mark Millar and Chris Weston.
- In Issue #6, Volume 1 of Alan Moore's The League of Extraordinary Gentlemen, Mycroft Holmes becomes the leader of British intelligence and uses the code-name "M" – a nod to the fictional head of MI6 in Ian Fleming's James Bond novels. It is hinted that he and his brother are not on the best of terms as a mention of Sherlock sending his regards are met by Mycroft with laughter and regarded as a joke. (Mycroft also appears as the Bond M in Son of Holmes and Anno Dracula).
- Mycroft Holmes is the head of "The Committee" in the comic book miniseries, Predator: Nemesis, by Gordon Rennie and Colin MacNeil and published by Dark Horse Comics. He hires the main character, Captain Edward Soames, to hunt down Spring-Heeled Jack, a predator hunting in the East End.
- Mycroft Holmes appears at least twice in the Italian comic book Martin Mystère and spin-off series Storie di Altrove/Stories from Elsewhere.
- The comic book series Muppet Sherlock Holmes features Rowlf the Dog as Mycroft Holmes.
- In the popular manga History's Strongest Disciple, Mycroft is a fictional martial artist who has worked with Sakaki Shio and Christopher Eclair.
- Mycroft is featured as the main character of the comic Mycroft Holmes and the Apocalypse Handbook, published by Titan Comics and written by Kareem Abdul-Jabbar and Raymon Obstfeld.
- Mycroft is a character of the manga series Moriarty the Patriot, of Ryosuke Takeuchi and Hikaru Miyoshi, an adaptation of the original Sherlock's stories depicted from Professor Moriarty's point of view. In this series, he is a government agent who answers directly to Queen Victoria.

=== Video games ===
- He appears in Sherlock Holmes: The Awakened (2006) and its 2023 remake as a government employee.
- He is mentioned in Sherlock Holmes: The Case of the Silver Earring (2004).
- Mycroft has a minor role in the 1987 Infocom game Sherlock: The Riddle of the Crown Jewels.
- He plays a central role in the 1996 PC game The Lost Files of Sherlock Holmes: The Case of the Rose Tattoo.
- In the 2009 PC and Xbox game Sherlock Holmes vs. Jack the Ripper, the younger Holmes receives assistance on a case from his brother.
- Mycroft appears as a minor character, voiced by Jon Severity, in the 2014 Focus Home Interactive game Sherlock Holmes: Crimes & Punishments. He primarily seeks his brother's help to combat a terrorist group known as The Merry Men, but also provides occasional assistance; in one case, Sherlock has the option to call on him to apprehend the suspects.
- The relationship between Sherlock and Mycroft plays a key role in the story of the 2021 game, Sherlock Holmes: Chapter One.

== Sources ==
- Barnes, Alan (2011). Sherlock Holmes on Screen. Titan Books. ISBN 9780857687760.
- Eyles, Allen (1986). Sherlock Holmes: A Centenary Celebration. Harper & Row. ISBN 0-06-015620-1.
- Smith, Daniel (2014) [2009]. The Sherlock Holmes Companion: An Elementary Guide (Updated ed.). Aurum Press. ISBN 978-1-78131-404-3.
