= Mycroft and Sherlock: The Empty Birdcage =

Mystery novel by Kareem Abdul-Jabbar and Anna Waterhouse

- First edition
- Author: Kareem Abdul-Jabbar; Anna Waterhouse
- Language: English
- Genre: Mystery novels
- Publisher: Titan Books
- Publication date: 2019
- Media type: Print (hardback)
- ISBN: 978-1785659300 (first U.S. edition, hardback)
- Preceded by: Mycroft and Sherlock

Mycroft and Sherlock: The Empty Birdcage is a mystery novel by Kareem Abdul-Jabbar and Anna Waterhouse. It is the third novel in their "Mycroft Holmes" series utilizing Sir Arthur Conan Doyle's characters of Mycroft and Sherlock Holmes.

== Reception ==
Publishers Weekly reviewed the novel positively saying "The authors do a stellar job of illuminating the siblings’ developing relationship while concocting a clever and twisty plot. Sherlockians will be enthralled." Library Journal called the third outing of Abdul-Jabbar and Waterhouse's Mycroft "another winner." San Francisco Book Review also praised the book and the characterization saying "This Mycroft is not only far more intriguing than previous versions, but one you can’t help but root for." Another positive review by author Lyndsay Faye said the authors "are marvelous at humanizing the legendarily prickly Holmes brothers" and hoped the book would be merely the third in "a great many more homages to the brothers Holmes."
