= National Register of Historic Places listings in Monona County, Iowa =

Location of Monona County in Iowa

This is intended to be a complete list of the properties and districts on the National Register of Historic Places in Monona County, Iowa, United States. Latitude and longitude coordinates are provided for many National Register properties and districts; these locations may be seen together in a map.

There are 11 properties and districts listed on the National Register in the county, including one National Historic Landmark.

This National Park Service list is complete through NPS recent listings posted March 21, 2025.

	Name on the Register	Image	Date listed	Location	City or town	Description
1	Garretson Outlet Bridge		March 12, 1999 (#99000313)	County Road K64 over Garretson Outlet Ditch; 42°12′47″N 96°06′42″W	Whiting vicinity	
2	Ingemann Danish Evangelical Lutheran Church and Cemetery	Ingemann Danish Evangelical Lutheran Church and Cemetery	September 10, 2012 (#12000779)	32044 County Road E54; 41°56′19″N 95°55′37″W	Moorhead	
3	Jones Creek Watershed Historic District		December 23, 1991 (#91001839)	Between the Little Sioux and Soldier Rivers, southwest of Moorhead; 41°54′28″N 95°55′30″W	Moorhead	
4	Mann School No. 2	Mann School No. 2	January 16, 2001 (#00001655)	Oak Ave, 3.5 miles northwest of the entrance to Preparation Canyon State Park; 41°55′48″N 95°57′12″W	Moorhead	
5	Monona County Courthouse	Monona County Courthouse	July 2, 1981 (#81000257)	Iowa Ave. 42°01′37″N 96°05′33″W	Onawa	
6	Onawa IOOF Opera House	Onawa IOOF Opera House	August 3, 1990 (#90001194)	1023 10th Ave. 42°01′32″N 96°05′49″W	Onawa	
7	Onawa Public Library	Onawa Public Library	October 1, 1979 (#79000917)	Iowa Ave. and 7th St. 42°01′35″N 96°05′36″W	Onawa	
8	Round Barn, Cooper Township		June 30, 1986 (#86001463)	Iowa Highway 141; 42°07′45″N 95°43′42″W	Mapleton vicinity	
9	South Jordan Cemetery	South Jordan Cemetery	March 5, 2021 (#100006221)	33928 260th St. 42°58′46″N 95°53′09″W	Moorhead vicinity	
10	Trinity Memorial Episcopal Church	Trinity Memorial Episcopal Church	August 10, 1990 (#90001217)	302 S. 7th St. 42°09′48″N 95°47′19″W	Mapleton	
11	Newell A. Whiting House	Newell A. Whiting House	August 10, 1990 (#90001216)	1106 Iowa Ave. 42°01′37″N 96°05′57″W	Onawa	

== See also ==
- List of National Historic Landmarks in Iowa
- National Register of Historic Places listings in Iowa
- Listings in neighboring counties: Burt (NE), Crawford, Harrison, Thurston (NE), Woodbury
