= The Baker Street Irregulars =

Literary society

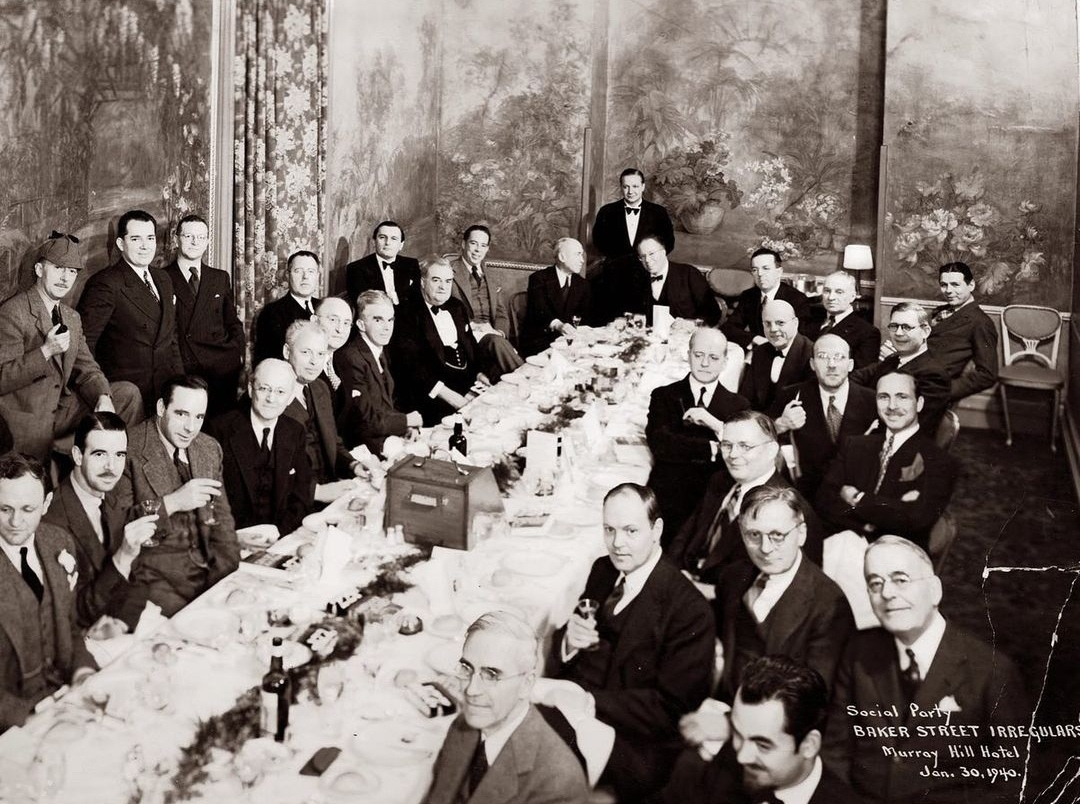
The Baker Street Irregulars meeting on January 30, 1940. Those pictured include Christopher Morley, Frederic Dorr Steele, Robert Keith Leavitt, and David A. Randall, among others.

The Baker Street Irregulars is an organization of Sherlock Holmes enthusiasts founded in 1934 by Christopher Morley. As of 2015, the nonprofit organization had about 300 members worldwide.

The group has published The Baker Street Journal, an "irregular quarterly of Sherlockiana", since 1946. Members of the society participate in "the game" which postulates that Holmes and Doctor Watson were real and Sir Arthur Conan Doyle was merely Watson's "literary agent".

== History ==
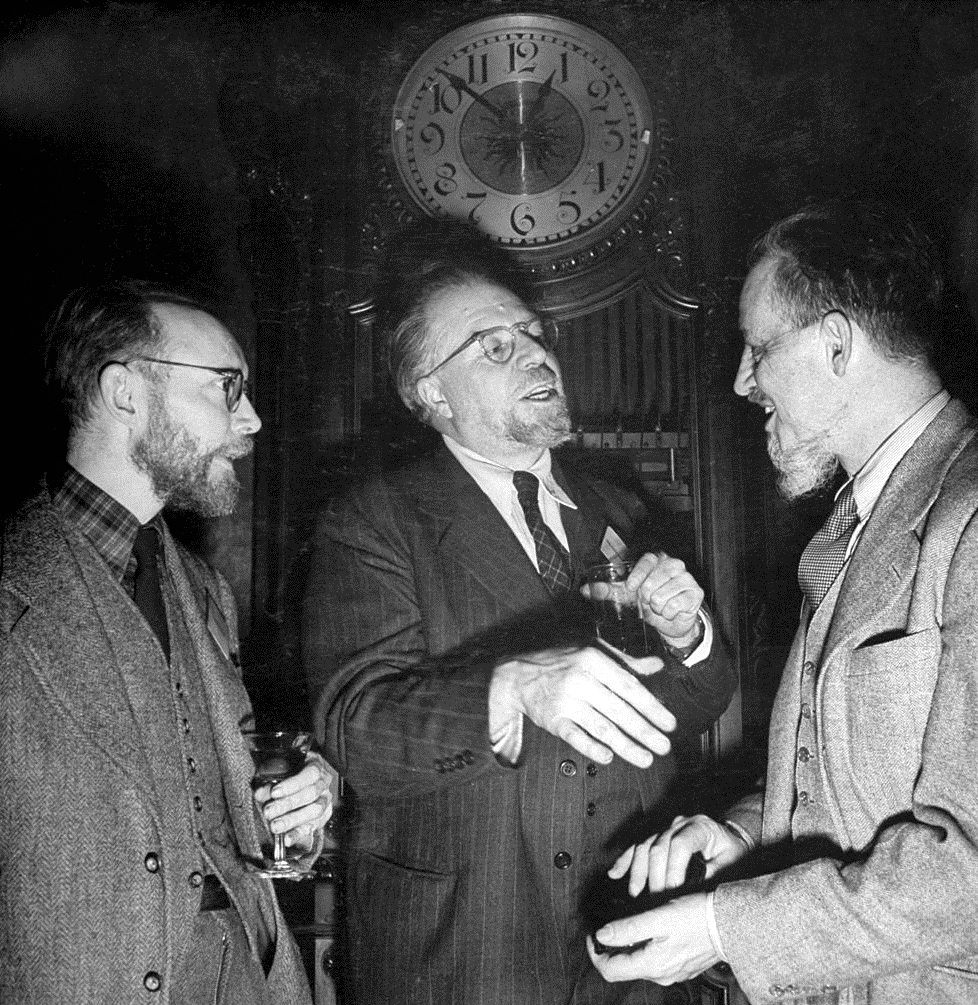
Baker Street Irregulars Fletcher Pratt, Christopher Morley and Rex Stout (1944)

The BSI was an outgrowth of Christopher Morley's informal group, "the Three Hours for Lunch Club", which discussed art and literature. The inaugural meeting of the BSI was held in 1934 at Christ Cella's restaurant in New York City. Initial attendees included William Gillette, Vincent Starrett, Alexander Woollcott, and Gene Tunney. Morley kept meetings quite irregular, but after leadership passed to Edgar W. Smith, meetings became more regular.

In February 1934, Elmer Davis, a friend of Morley, wrote a constitution for the group explaining its purpose and stating that anyone who passed a certain test was eligible to join. This test, a crossword puzzle by Morley's younger brother Frank, was published in the May 1934 issue of Saturday Review of Literature.

Edgar W. Smith led the BSI from 1940 until 1960, initially using the title "Buttons" and later "Buttons-cum-Commissionaire". Julian Wolff was the head of the BSI from late 1960 to 1986, and used the title "Commissionaire". From 1986 until 1997, Thomas L. Stix Jr. was the leader of the organization, and used the title "Wiggins". The title "Wiggins" has since been used for the leadership position.

The organization long resisted admitting women, a policy which spawned a female-centered organization, the Adventuresses of Sherlock Holmes, whose founders had picketed an all-male BSI gathering. The BSI invested its first woman in 1991: Dame Jean Conan Doyle. She was followed by Katherine McMahon, the first woman to solve the crossword puzzle. McMahon was followed by Edith Meiser, who wrote numerous Holmesian radio scripts for The Adventures of Sherlock Holmes and The New Adventures of Sherlock Holmes.

Leadership of the BSI passed to Michael Whelan in 1997 and Michael Kean in 2020.

== Membership ==
Membership is by invitation only based on criteria unknown to the public. Members take on a name inspired by the canon with the head of the organization known as "Wiggins". As of 2025, the organization has had a total of 760 members, whose names, years of investiture, and pseudonym are listed in the reference volume Sherlock Holmes and the Cryptic Clues.

=== Notable members ===
Among the members of the Baker Street Irregulars, past and present:

- Karen Anderson
- Poul Anderson
- Curtis Armstrong
- Isaac Asimov
- John Ball
- William S. Baring-Gould
- Terry Belanger
- John Stevens Berry
- Anthony Boucher
- Herbert Brean
- Howard Brody
- Jan Burke
- Dana Cameron
- Frank Cho
- John D. Clark
- Bert Coules
- Frederic Dannay
- Basil Davenport
- David Stuart Davies
- Elmer Davis
- August Derleth
- Michael Dirda
- The Marquess of Donegall
- Dame Jean Conan Doyle
- Stillman Drake
- Ralph Earle, II
- Lyndsay Faye
- Robert L. Fish
- Neil Gaiman
- John Gardner
- Paul Gore-Booth
- Richard Lancelyn Green
- Michael Harrison
- Jeffrey Hatcher
- Herman Herst Jr.
- Ebbe Hoff
- Banesh Hoffmann
- Richard H. Hoffmann
- Nancy Holder
- Laurie R. King
- Leslie S. Klinger
- Robert Keith Leavitt
- Robert A. W. Lowndes
- Ken Ludwig
- Bonnie MacBird
- Ronald Mansbridge
- Thomas M. McDade
- Edith Meiser
- Nicholas Meyer
- Christopher Morley
- Frank Morley
- David F. Musto
- Lenore Glen Offord
- Fulton Oursler
- Will Oursler
- Stuart Palmer
- Otto Penzler
- Svend Petersen
- H. C. Potter
- Fletcher Pratt
- Michael J. Quigley
- David A. Randall
- Dana S. Richards
- Franklin D. Roosevelt (honorary)
- Albert M. Rosenblatt
- S. J. Rozan
- Peter A. Ruber
- Richard B. Shull
- Red Smith
- Vincent Starrett
- Daniel Stashower
- Frederic Dorr Steele
- Chris Steinbrunner
- Rex Stout
- Eve Titus
- Harry Truman (honorary)
- Manly Wade Wellman
- J. N. Williamson
- Douglas Wilmer

== The Baker Street Journal ==
The group publishes a periodical, The Baker Street Journal. The original series of the BSJ was started in 1946, but it ceased in 1949. In 1951, Edgar Smith began publishing it again as a quarterly; it has continued publication since that time.

== Scion societies ==
The BSI has spawned numerous "scion societies", many of which are officially recognized by the BSI. The first was The Five Orange Pips of Westchester County, New York, in 1935. Independent Sherlockian groups include the Adventuresses of Sherlock Holmes, the U.K.’s Sherlock Holmes Society of London, and Canada's The Bootmakers of Toronto. The most active club in the United States is The Illustrious Clients of Indianapolis.
