= Thomas M. McDade =

American lawyer

Thomas Mario McDade (July 2, 1907 – March 2, 1996) was an American lawyer, FBI agent, business executive, and writer. McDade was known as the last living retired FBI agent and lawman from the Dillinger Squad.

== Biography ==
McDade was born in Brooklyn, New York City on July 2, 1907. He attended the City College of New York, where he studied accounting. He then studied law at the recently opened St. John's University School of Law, where he earned his LL.B. degree (cum laude) in 1931 and an LL.M. degree in 1932.

After working briefly as a law clerk and legal editor, McDade applied for a position in the Bureau of Investigation (soon renamed the Federal Bureau of Investigation). He worked as an FBI special agent for four years, from 1934 to 1938, specializing in cases involving bank robbery and kidnapping. He was involved in several high-profile cases, including the shoot-outs that killed George "Baby Face" Nelson in 1934 and Kate "Ma" Barker and Fred Barker in 1935. He later moved to a supervisory position before leaving the FBI in 1938.

McDade then spent some time in private law practice before joining the United States Army in 1942. He spent two years in the South Pacific theater during World War II, earning a Bronze Star and attaining the rank of lieutenant colonel. In 1946, McDade became an accounting manager for the General Foods Corporation in New York. He was promoted to Assistant Controller in 1950 and to Controller in 1953. He retired in 1972. He died in Southbury, Connecticut on March 2, 1996, at the age of 88.

== The Annals of Murder ==
In 1961, McDade published The Annals of Murder, a true crime encyclopedia in which he summarized hundreds of early publications about homicides in the United States before 1900. The work was "of towering importance" in its field, and a New Yorker writer later called it "the indispensable guide to Early American murder." Book dealers in the true-crime area would sometimes seek to emphasize a publication's rarity by describing it as "not in McDade." A dealer once made such a comment to the author himself, who pointedly responded, "I'm McDade."

McDade also published more than 100 articles in a wide variety of publications, most of which also dealt with crimes and criminals.

== Other interests ==
A devotee of the Sherlock Holmes stories by Arthur Conan Doyle, McDade became a member of The Baker Street Irregulars in 1957. He was a regular attendee of the group's annual dinner, and toasted Pola Stout (the wife of BSI member Rex Stout) as The Woman in 1966. He also contributed several articles to The Baker Street Journal.

== FBI Diary ==
After McDade's death, it was revealed that he kept a daily diary during his four years with the FBI. In 2013, McDade's family donated the diary to the National Law Enforcement Museum in Washington, D.C. A complete transcript of the diary has been published online.
