= Monique Barbeau =

Canadian executive chef

Monique Andree Barbeau (born in Vancouver, Canada) was the executive chef at a restaurant called Fuller’s in Seattle, won the James Beard Award in 1994 as Best Chef in the Northwest (tied with Tom Douglas (chef)) and appeared on In Julia's Kitchen with Master Chefs.

Barbeau is a graduate of The Culinary Institute of America. After graduation, she worked at restaurants in New York City including The Quilted Giraffe, Le Bernardin and Chanterelle. When she was 26, she returned to the Pacific Northwest and “took over” Fuller’s kitchen. In 1991, she graduated from Florida International University with a BS in hospitality management.

Along with fellow chefs Anne Rosenzweig, Rozanne Gold and Susan Spicer, she was one of the four “Women Chefs of Peace.”

Barbeau cooked for the cast and crew of the tv show Northern Exposure. She also cooked for students at Currier House (Harvard College) as part of the Visiting Chef’s Program for the school’s Dining Services.
