= Anne Rosenzweig =

American retired chef and restaurateur

Anne Rosenzweig is an American retired chef and restaurateur based in New York City, who was known as “the Greta Garbo of the food world.” Her restaurants included Arcadia (executive chef and co-owner with Ken Aretsky), the Lobster Club and Inside.

== Biography ==
In the late 1970s, Rosenzweig graduated from Columbia University with an anthropology degree. Afterwards, she did several years of field work in Africa add Nepal. When she returned to New York City, she became an unpaid apprentice at several NYC kitchens before becoming the brunch, pastry and head chef at the Greenwich Village restaurant Vanessa. It was there that she caught the attention of food critic Mimi Sheraton.

== Career ==
During the Clinton Administration she was she was a finalist to become the White House chef, and the only woman to be considered for the position. In 1987, she “took over the running” of the 21 Club in New York.

Mayukh Sen described her dishes as “at once stylized and freewheeling, gently upset the conventions framing New American cuisine.”

Along with fellow chefs Monique Barbeau, Rozanne Gold and Susan Spicer, she was one of the four “Women Chefs of Peace.”

== Awards and honors ==
In the 1990s, Rosenzweig was nominated four times for "The Best Chefs in America" James Beard Foundation Award and in 1987, was a winner in their Who’s Who in Food and Beverage.

Her Upper East Side restaurant Arcadia received a three star review from Ruth Reichl at The New York Times.

Rosenzweig was the culinary director of the 1992 James Beard Aware Foundation as well as a nominee for Best Chef.

== Publications ==
- The Arcadia Seasonal Mural and Cookbook, 1986
