= John Mendenhall =

John Mendenhall may refer to:

- John Mendenhall (American football) (1948–2021), American football defensive tackle
- John Mendenhall (colonel) (1829–1892), Union Army officer during the American Civil War
- John C. Mendenhall (1904–1976), American politician from Iowa
