= Herbert Brean =

American journalist and writer

Herbert Brean (December 10, 1907 – May 7, 1973) was an American journalist and crime fiction writer, best known for his recurring series characters William Deacon and Reynold Frame. He was a director and former executive vice president of the Mystery Writers of America, a group for which he also taught a class in mystery writing. Aside from his seven mystery crime novels, he also published non-fiction books and articles, and mystery magazine short stories. Alfred Hitchcock used "A Case of Identity" (1953), one of Brean's many articles for Life, as the basis for Hitchcock's film The Wrong Man (1957).

As a lifelong Sherlock Holmes fan, Brean was a member of The Baker Street Irregulars, and as such he wrote the introduction to at least one Holmes edition.

== Novels ==
| Year | Title | Publisher |
|---|---|---|
| 1949 | Wilders Walk Away | Heinemann |
| 1950 | The Darker the Night | Heinemann |
| 1952 | Hardly a Man is Now Alive (US) / Murder Now and Then (UK) | Heinemann |
| 1954 | The Clock Strikes Thirteen | Heinemann |
| 1957 | A Matter of Fact (US) / Collar for the Killer (UK) | Heinemann |
| 1961 | The Traces of Brillhart | Heinemann |
| 1966 | The Traces of Merrilee | Morrow |
