= Iowa's 13th House of Representatives district =

American legislative district

House District 13
- Type: District of the Lower house
- Location: Iowa
- Representative: Travis Sitzmann
- Parent organization: Iowa General Assembly

The 13th District of the Iowa House of Representatives in the state of Iowa. It is currently composed of Monona County, as well as part of Woodbury, Cherokee, and Plymouth Counties.

== Current elected officials ==
Travis Sitzmann is the representative currently representing the district.

== Past representatives ==
The district has previously been represented by:

- John C. Mendenhall, 1971–1973
- Delbert L. Trowbridge, 1973–1973
- Rollin Howell, 1973–1983
- Rod Halvorson, 1983–1995
- Michael Cormack, 1995–2003
- Bill Schickel, 2003–2009
- Sharon Steckman, 2009–2013
- Chris Hall, 2013–2023
- Ken Carlson, 2023–2025
