= Newell A. Whiting House =

Historic house in Iowa, United States

- U.S. National Register of Historic Places
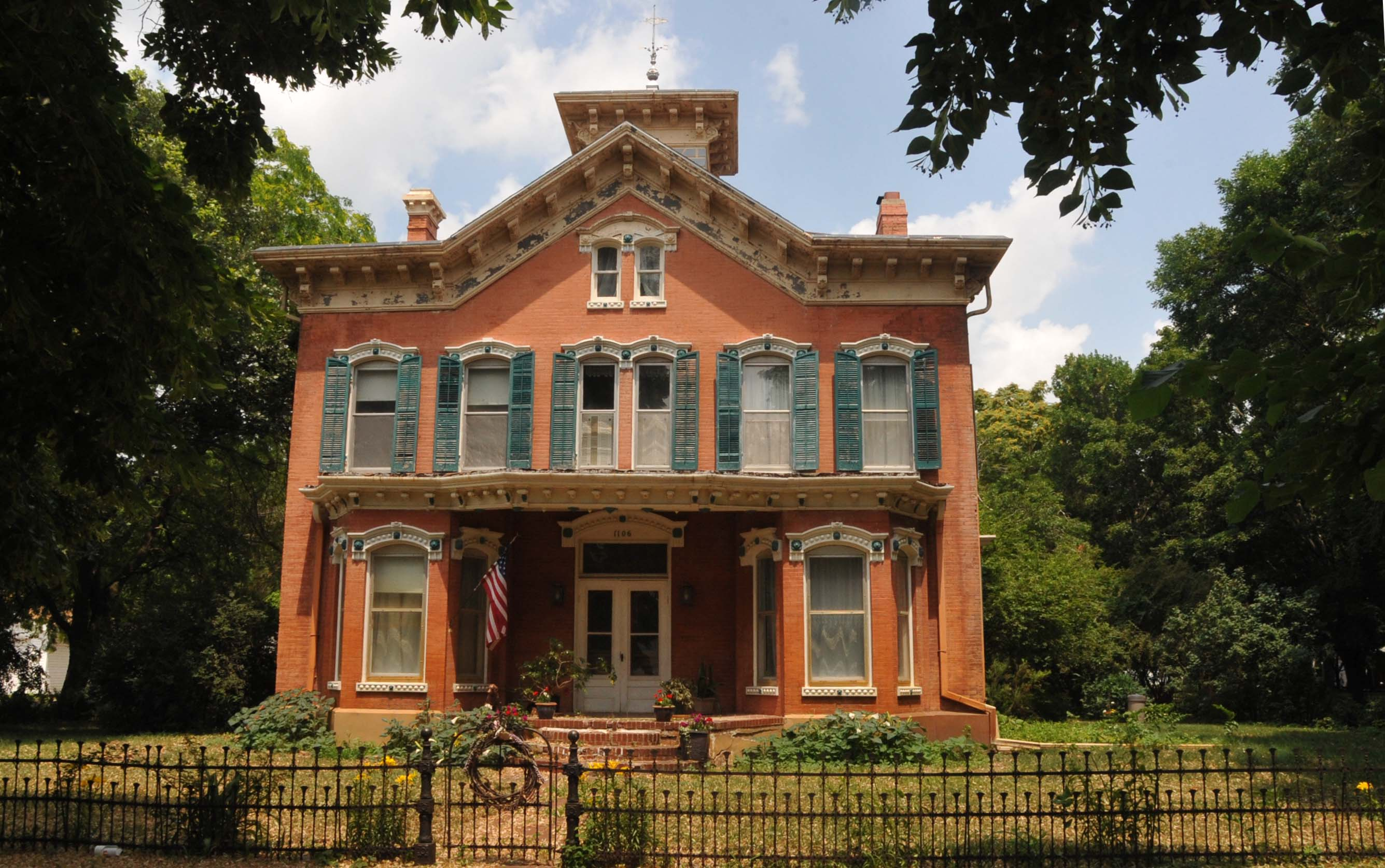

- Location within Iowa Location within the United States
- Location: 1106 Iowa Ave. Onawa, Iowa
- Coordinates: 42°01′37.4″N 96°05′56.5″W
- Built: 1880-1882
- Architectural style: Italianate
- NRHP reference No.: 90001216
- Added to NRHP: August 10, 1990

The Newell A. Whiting House is a historic building located in Onawa, Iowa, United States. Whiting was a hardware merchant and sawmill owner, who built this house for his second wife. It is a simple, yet fairly pure, an example of the Italianate style constructed in the mid-19th century. The 2 1/2-story brick house features bracketed eaves, wall dormers, tall, narrow windows with metal hood moldings, bay windows on the main floor, and alongside porch on the east elevation. It is capped with a hip roof and a cupola. The house was listed on the National Register of Historic Places in 1990.
