= Onawa IOOF Opera House =

- U.S. National Register of Historic Places
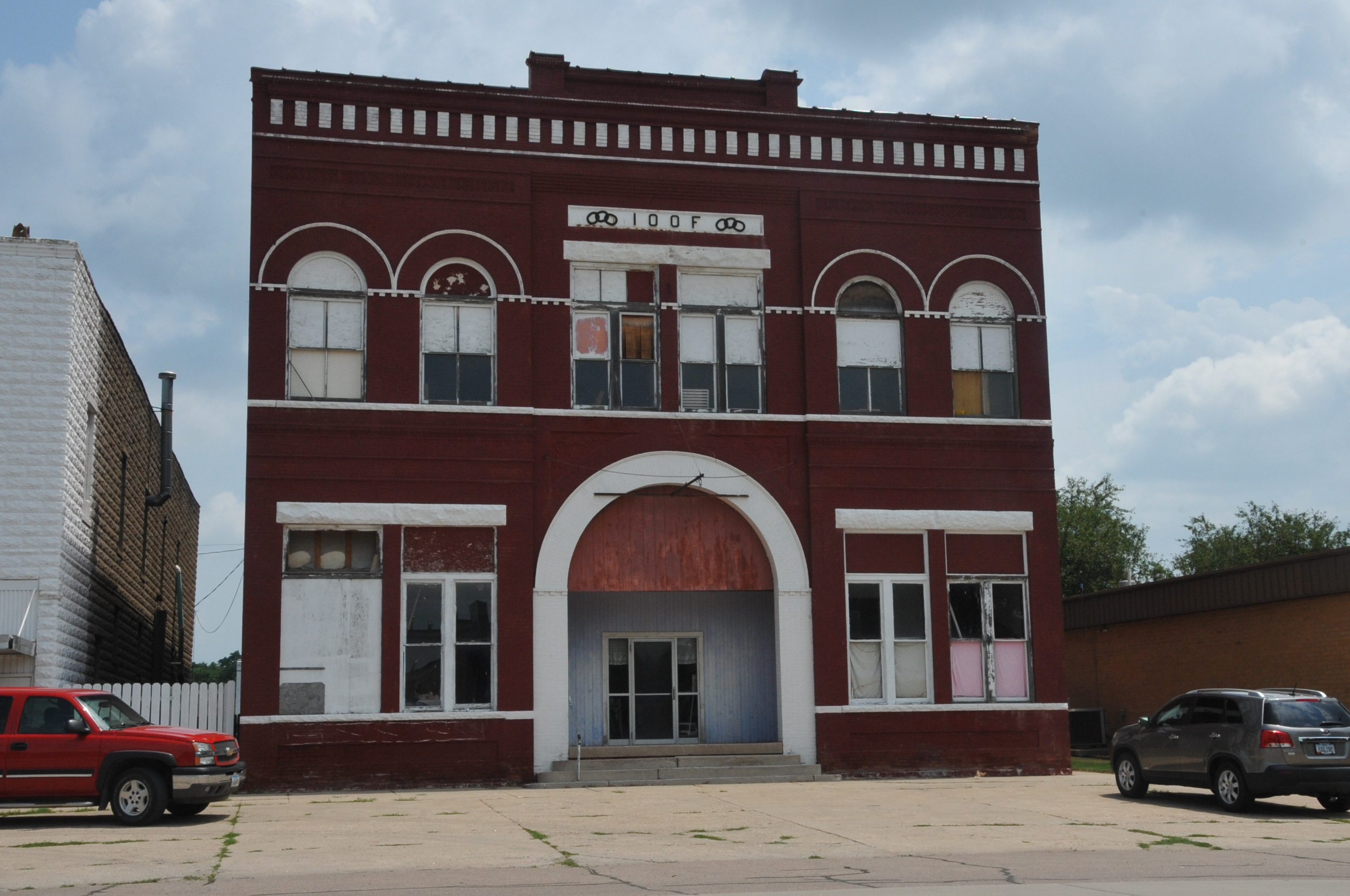

- Location within Iowa Location within the United States
- Location: 1023 Tenth Ave. Onawa, Iowa
- Coordinates: 42°01′32.2″N 96°05′48.7″W
- Area: less than one acre
- Built: 1900
- Architect: W.E. Hodgin
- Architectural style: Romanesque Revival
- NRHP reference No.: 90001194
- Added to NRHP: August 3, 1990

The Onawa IOOF Opera House, also known as the Onawa Opera House, is a historic opera house located in Onawa, Iowa. It was completed in November, 1900, only to be heavily damaged in a fire a month later, on December 24, 1900.

It has been deemed historically significant as the building most strongly associated Onawa's "strong tradition of live-stage entertainment" from the late 1880s to the mid-1920s, involving three structures.

It was listed on the National Register of Historic Places in 1990.
