= William S. Baring-Gould =

English writer (1913–1967)

- Born: 1913
- Died: 10 August 1967 (aged 53–54)
- Occupations: Novelist, writer
- Relatives: Sabine Baring-Gould (grandfather)
- Writing career
- Genres: Fiction, mystery, detective
- Notable work: Sherlock Holmes of Baker Street: A Life of the World's First Consulting Detective

William Stuart Baring-Gould (1913 – 10 August 1967) was a noted Sherlock Holmes scholar, best known as the author of the influential 1962 fictional biography Sherlock Holmes of Baker Street: A Life of the World's First Consulting Detective.

== Biography ==
He was the son of William Drake Baring-Gould (1878–1921), a grandson of Sabine Baring-Gould and a descendant of John Baring.

He married Lucile "Ceil" Marguerite Moody (1914–2010) in 1936. They had a son William (d. 1966) and a daughter Judy.

He was creative director of Time magazine's circulation and corporate education departments from 1937 until his death.

== Writing ==
In 1955, Baring-Gould privately published The Chronological Holmes, an attempt to lay out, in chronological order, all the events alluded to in the Sherlock Holmes stories. Three years later, Baring-Gould wrote The Annotated Mother Goose: Nursery Rhymes Old and New, Arranged and Explained with his wife, Lucile "Ceil" Baring-Gould. The book provides a wealth of information about nursery rhymes and includes often-banned bawdy rhymes. In 1967, Baring-Gould published The Annotated Sherlock Holmes, an annotated edition of the Sherlock Holmes canon. Baring-Gould also wrote The Lure of the Limerick, a study of the history and allure of limericks, published in 1967; it included a collection of limericks, arranged alphabetically, and a bibliography. Posthumously published in 1969 was Nero Wolfe of West Thirty-fifth Street: The Life and Times of America's Largest Private Detective, a fictional biography of Rex Stout's detective character Nero Wolfe; in this book, Baring-Gould popularised the theory that Wolfe was the son of Sherlock Holmes and Irene Adler.

== Major works ==
- New Chronology of Sherlock Holmes and Doctor Watson (The Baker Street Journal 1948, Vol. III, No. 1, pp. 107–125 and Vol. III, No. 2, pp. 238–251)
- The Chronological Holmes (self-published in 300 copies, 1955)
- Sherlock Holmes of Baker Street (Bramhall House, New York, 1962)
- The Annotated Mother Goose (Bramhall House, New York, 1962)
- The Annotated Sherlock Holmes (Clarkson N. Potter, New York, 1967)
- The Lure of the Limerick (Clarkson N. Potter, New York, 1967)
- Nero Wolfe of West Thirty-Fifth Street (Viking Press, New York, 1969)
