= John Stevens Berry =

American lawyer

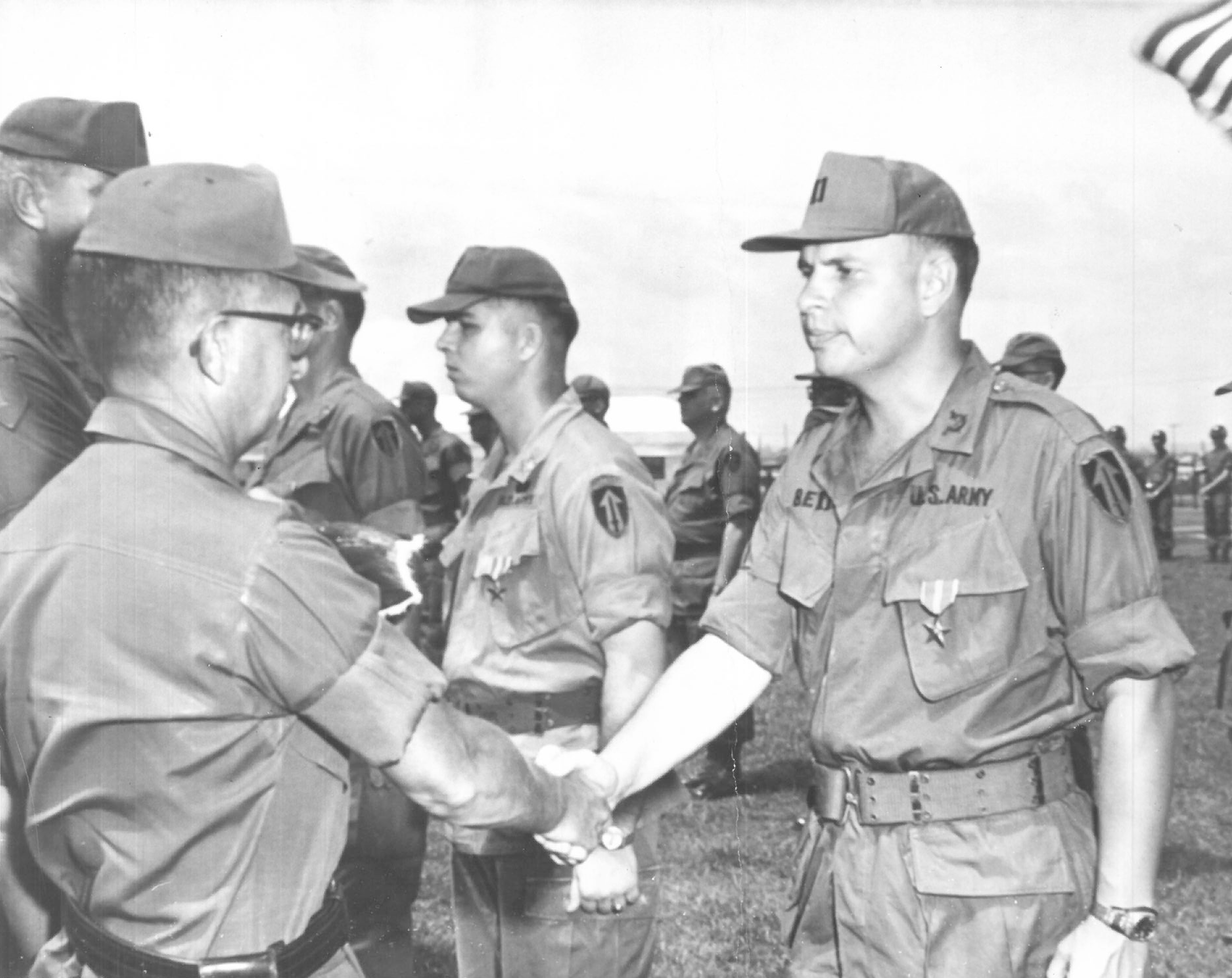
- Berry receiving his Bronze Star Medal at II Field Force in Vietnam
- Education: New Mexico Military Institute; Stanford University (BA); Northwestern University (JD)
- Occupation: Attorney

John Stevens Berry Sr. is an American attorney and the founder of Berry Law Firm in Lincoln, Nebraska. He is notable for a number of high-profile cases including the defense of Green Berets in Vietnam.

== Early life and military career ==
John Stevens Berry Sr. is a native of Onawa, Iowa.

Berry graduated from New Mexico Military Institute in Roswell, New Mexico, in 1956. In 1960, he earned his Bachelor of Arts degree in English from Stanford University in Palo Alto, California, where in 1958 he won the Academy of American Poets Prize. He went on to earn his Juris Doctor degree from Northwestern University in Chicago, Illinois in 1965 and was admitted to the Nebraska State Bar in 1965. Berry graduated from the Infantry Officer School at Fort Benning, Georgia, and Judge Advocate General's Legal Center and School in Charlottesville, Virginia.

As a Captain in Vietnam, Berry was awarded the Bronze Star and the Vietnamese Medal of Honor First Class (Gold). He served as defense counsel with the 1st Infantry Division, the 1st Cavalry Division, the 199th Light Infantry Brigade, the 11th Armored Cavalry Regiment, the 101st Airborne, the 82nd Airborne, and the 5th Special Forces on a temporary basis.

Berry is recognized in the New Mexico Military Institute Hall of Fame. He is also the recipient of the Vietnamese Cross of Gallantry (with Palm) and the recipient for the FBI Award for Service in the Public Interest.

== Green Beret Affair and Those Gallant Men: On Trial in Vietnam ==
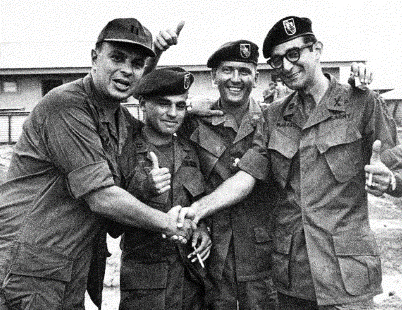
John Stevens Berry Sr. with the Green Berets he defended in Vietnam in 1969

In Vietnam from 1968 to 1969, Berry was the chief defense counsel for the largest general court martial jurisdiction in Vietnam, II Field Force Vietnam, numbering more than 80,000 soldiers. His work on the defense counsel includes the "Green Beret Affair", where in 1969 members of the Green Berets were charged with the murder of a double agent.

Berry wrote on his first-hand experiences as a lawyer fighting in a combat zone in Those Gallant Men: On Trial in Vietnam, published May 1, 1984. The book examines the charges filed against the Green Berets and maneuvers through the legal proceedings of the trial, offering an insider's view through stories and explanations of the dynamics and strategy of litigation between the CIA, the US Army, and the Green Berets during the Vietnam War. His work in the field was also featured in the book Judge Advocates in Combat: Army Lawyers in Military Operations from Vietnam to Haiti by Fred Borch.

== Law career ==
Following his military service, Berry was briefly associated with Henry B. Rothblatt Offices in New York from 1970 through 1971. There, he tried a number of high-profile cases before returning to Lincoln, Nebraska to continue regional practice primarily in the areas of criminal defense, drug crimes, driving while intoxicated, white collar crime, state and federal felony practice, veterans appeals and murder.

In 2000, Berry's son, John Berry Jr., left the army for law school and join Berry Law Firm. His son Rory Berry also works at the law firm.

In 1986, Berry was the Civilian Defense Counsel for one of the biggest drug busts in Japanese history.

Berry has appeared in court in 24 states and two foreign countries. He has been invited to lecture on issues regarding criminal defense in the military at the Judge Advocate General's School at the University of Virginia, and has conducted seminars in Lincoln and Omaha, Nebraska and Kansas City, Missouri for practicing lawyers. He has achieved the distinguished AV Preeminent Rating by Martindale-Hubbell and was selected for inclusion in Super Lawyers. Berry Law Firm is listed in the Martindale-Hubbell Bar Register of Preeminent Attorneys.

In 2014, Berry co-authored the book The Twelfth Victim: The Innocence of Caril Fugate in the Starkweather Murder Rampage with Ohio lawyer Linda Battisti on Caril Ann Fugate, the teen girlfriend who accompanied spree killer Charles Starkweather during the murders of 1958. The book was recommended by Steven Drizin, attorney for Brendan Dassey, whose case gained international attention due to the Netflix series Making a Murderer, which exposed the prosecution's coercion of Dassey resulting in a false confession.

Berry is a member of the Melvin Belli Society, and a fellow on the American Board of Criminal Defense Lawyers and of the National Organization for the Reform of Marijuana Laws.

== Personal life ==
While practicing law, Berry hosted The John Stevens Berry Show for more than a decade, first airing on KLIN and later on KZUM. The last day of the show, August 1, 1997, was declared John Stevens Berry Day by the former governor of Nebraska, Ben Nelson.

Berry is an avid fan of Sherlock Holmes, having received his first Holmes book in fourth grade. He is a member of the Baker Street Irregulars, a Sherlockian group formed in 1934.

== Works ==
- Berry, John Stevens (1973). Darkness Of Snow. San luis Obispo, CA: Solo.
- Berry, John Stevens (1984). Those Gallant Men: On Trial in Vietnam. Novato, CA: Presidio Press. ISBN 0891411860.
- Berry, John Stevens & Battisti, Linda M. (2014). The Twelfth Victim: The Innocence of Caril Fugate in the Starkweather Murder Rampage. Addicus Books. ISBN 1938803655
