= Ken Aretsky =

American restaurateur

Ken Aretsky (born 1941) is a New York City restaurateur who has owned several dining establishments and was the general manager of the 21 Club in Manhattan during 1987–1995. He has also been noted for his geniality and dapper style of dress.

== Biography ==
Aretsky is a graduate of C.W. Post College. He has been married three times. He has at least four children, including daughter Beth, a Culinary Institute of America chef, and son Gene, a restaurant manager.

== Career ==
Aretsky has been described as “one of New York’s most accomplished restaurateurs of the last thirty years.” He opened his first restaurant, Truman's, in Roslyn, New York on Long Island in 1971, after which he briefly worked as a stockbroker. It was inspired by Maxwell's Plum.

On the Upper East Side, he opened the Oren & Aretsky bar during the 1980s. He bought the shuttered Christ Cella steakhouse in August 1995, managed by son, Gene since about 2005, and which he later morphed into Aretsky’s Patroon Restaurant and Rooftop Bar in 2019. In 1996,he opened the Butterfield 81 bistro, where his daughter, Beth, was a chef. He and Anne Rosenzweig also launched Arcadia, which closed in 1997. He was president and General Manager of the 21 Club, from 1987 until 1995.
