= Chris Steinbrunner =

American historian

Peter Christian Steinbrunner (1934 – 7 July 1993) was an American author, broadcaster and historian specializing in detective film and fiction.

Steinbrunner grew up in Queens, New York, and attended Fordham University, where he earned a Bachelor of Arts degree and a master's degree in sociology. While at Fordham, and for some years afterward, he was the host of a weekly radio program broadcast from the university station WFUV-FM, on which he presented interviews as well as occasional dramatizations of Sherlock Holmes stories.

Following his college years, he was employed at the local New York City television station WOR-TV (later WWOR), becoming its film programming director. He remained at the station until the mid-1980s, during which time he produced entertainment specials about James Bond and Sherlock Holmes.

Steinbrunner was well known among Holmes aficionados, and mystery fans in general, as exceptionally knowledgeable in his field. He was a founding member of The Baker Street Irregulars’ scion society "The Priory Scholars of Fordham". He was a long-time member of the Mystery Writers of America, receiving its Edgar Award for co-authoring the Encyclopedia of Mystery and Detection in 1976.

Amongst Steinbrunner's written works were the program notes to the American Film Institute's festival "Sherlock Holmes on the Screen", presented in Washington, D.C., in 1972.

== Bibliography ==
- Karlson, Katherine. "Stand with me here upon the terrace," The Serpentine Muse, Vol. 12, No. 1 (Summer 1993), pp. 7–8. Chris Steinbrunner tribute article.
- Steinbrunner, Chris (with Penzler, Otto; Shibuk, Charles; Lachman, Marvin; and Nevins Jr, Francis M.). Detectionary. Overlook Press, 1977. ISBN 0-87951-041-2
- Steinbrunner, Chris (with Goldblatt, Burt). Cinema of the Fantastic. Galahad Books, 1974. ISBN 0-88365-256-0
- Steinbrunner, Chris; editor (with Penzler, Otto). Encyclopedia of Mystery and Detection. McGraw-Hill, 1976. ISBN 0-07-061121-1
- Steinbrunner, Chris (with Michaels, Norman). The Films of Sherlock Holmes. Citadel Press, 1978. ISBN 0-8065-0599-0
