= Ebbe Hoff =

American academic

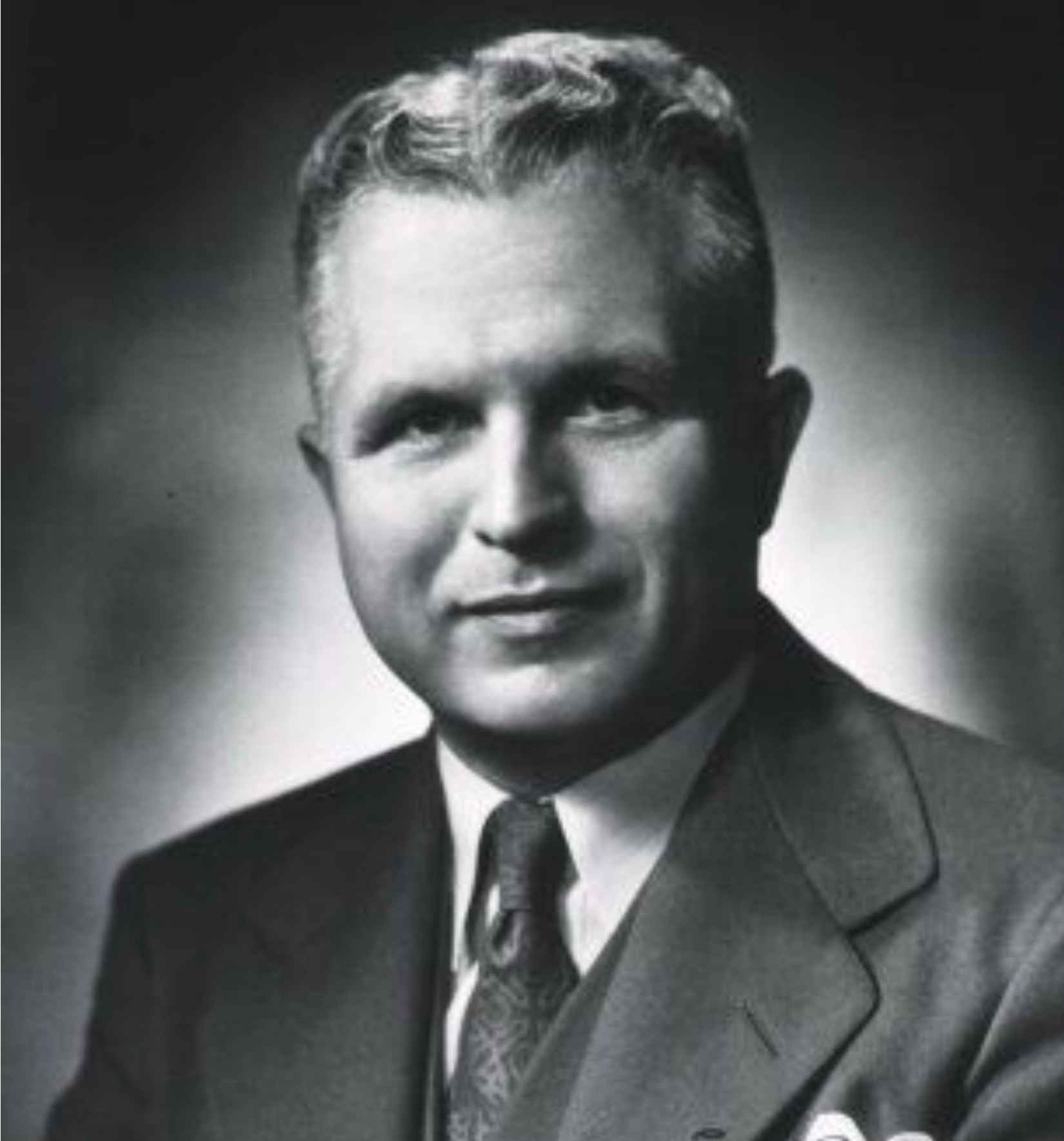
Ebbe Curtis Hoff

Ebbe Curtis Hoff (August 12, 1906 in Rexford, Kansas – February 17, 1985 in Richmond, Virginia) was chairman of the Department of Neurological Science at the Medical College of Virginia, founding Dean, School of Graduate Studies and founding director of the Virginia Division of Substance Abuse.

He earned a bachelor's degree in Zoology summa cum laude at the University of Washington in 1928 and a Doctor of Philosophy in physiology from St Catherine's College, Oxford in 1932 where he studied neurophysiology, writing his thesis on the theory of the synapse under Nobel Prize laureate Sir Charles Sherrington.

From 1932 to 1936 he held the Alexander Browne Coxe research fellowship in the School of Medicine at Yale University, where he taught and conducted neurophysiologic research. He also taught at Sarah Lawrence College.

Returning to Oxford he attended medical school (United Kingdom) earning his Bachelor of Medicine and Surgery, Doctor of Medicine and Master of Surgery degrees and the London Hospital Medical College, finishing in 1940. Narrowly avoiding the Blitz, he did higher risk home deliveries with midwives.

Once again at Yale, he was part of the Yale Aeromedical Research Unit under John Farquhar Fulton, Chair of Physiology, coauthoring publications on aviation medicine. During World War II, he was commissioned Lt. Commander in the Medical Corps of the United States Navy as a flight surgeon and became a leading authority on diving hazards and precautions, as well as submarine and aviation medicine. He authored the first comprehensive text on compressed air diving and submarine medicine. He participated in developing the modified G-Suit design adopted for US Navy pilots. He took part in unsuccessful attempts to develop a shark repellent. He also served as a Naval Attaché at the American Embassy, London. Because he was fluent in German, after the victory in Europe he spent time in Berlin recruiting scientist. He left active military service with the rank of Commander in 1946 but remained in the Naval Reserve.

After the war, he began teaching as Professor of Physiology at the Medical College of Virginia in 1946. He was the first director of the Division of Alcohol Studies and Rehabilitation of the Virginia Health Department, founded in 1948. He continued teaching, research, administration and clinical work at the alcoholic treatment clinic housed at MCV.

In collaboration with his wife Phebe Hoff, he edited a multi-volume history of Preventive Medicine in World War II, which formed a part of the official history of the Medical Department of the United States Army in World War II published by the Historical Unit, U.S. Army Medical Department.

In 1977, he was granted emeritus professor status.

Dr. Hoff was a member of Phi Beta Kappa national scholastic honor society, Sigma Xi science honorary society, the American Physiological Society and the Medical Society of Virginia.

He was a member of the Torch Club of Richmond, the Richmond Astronomical Society and St Mary's Episcopal Church, Goochland County, Virginia where he served as director of the Sunday School, senior warden and vestryman. He was also a member of The Baker Street Irregulars, a club of Sherlock Holmes devotees. He held amateur radio license WA4CBM. He spent many summer holidays tenting in Westmore, Vermont on Lake Willoughby. He was also a member of the British Astronomical Association from 1957-1957.

== Selected publications ==
- Alcoholism: The Hidden Addiction (New York: Seabury Press, 1974)
- A bibliographical sourcebook of compressed air diving and submarine medicine (Washington, Bureau of Medicine and Surgery, Navy Dept., 1948–1954)
- A bibliography of aviation medicine (Springfield, Ill., Baltimore, Md., C.C. Thomas, 1942)
- United States Army Medical Service. Preventive Medicine in World War II - a multi-volume series which he edited with his wife Phebe Margaret Hoff (Washington, DC: Office of the Surgeon General, Department of the Army) including
  - Volume II. Environmental Hygiene
  - Volume III: Personal Health Measures and Immunization,
  - Volume IV. Communicable Diseases Transmitted Chiefly through Respiratory and Alimentary Tracts.
  - Volume VI: Communicable Diseases: Malaria
  - Volume VII. Communicable Diseases: Arthropodborne Diseases Other than Milaria
  - Volume IX. Special Fields.
- A New Holmesian Treasure Trove (The Problem of Biffley Vicarage), Novella, Baker Street Journal [V14,#3-4,09-12/1964] (with Phebe M. Hoff)
