= Ken Carlson =

American politician (born 1951)

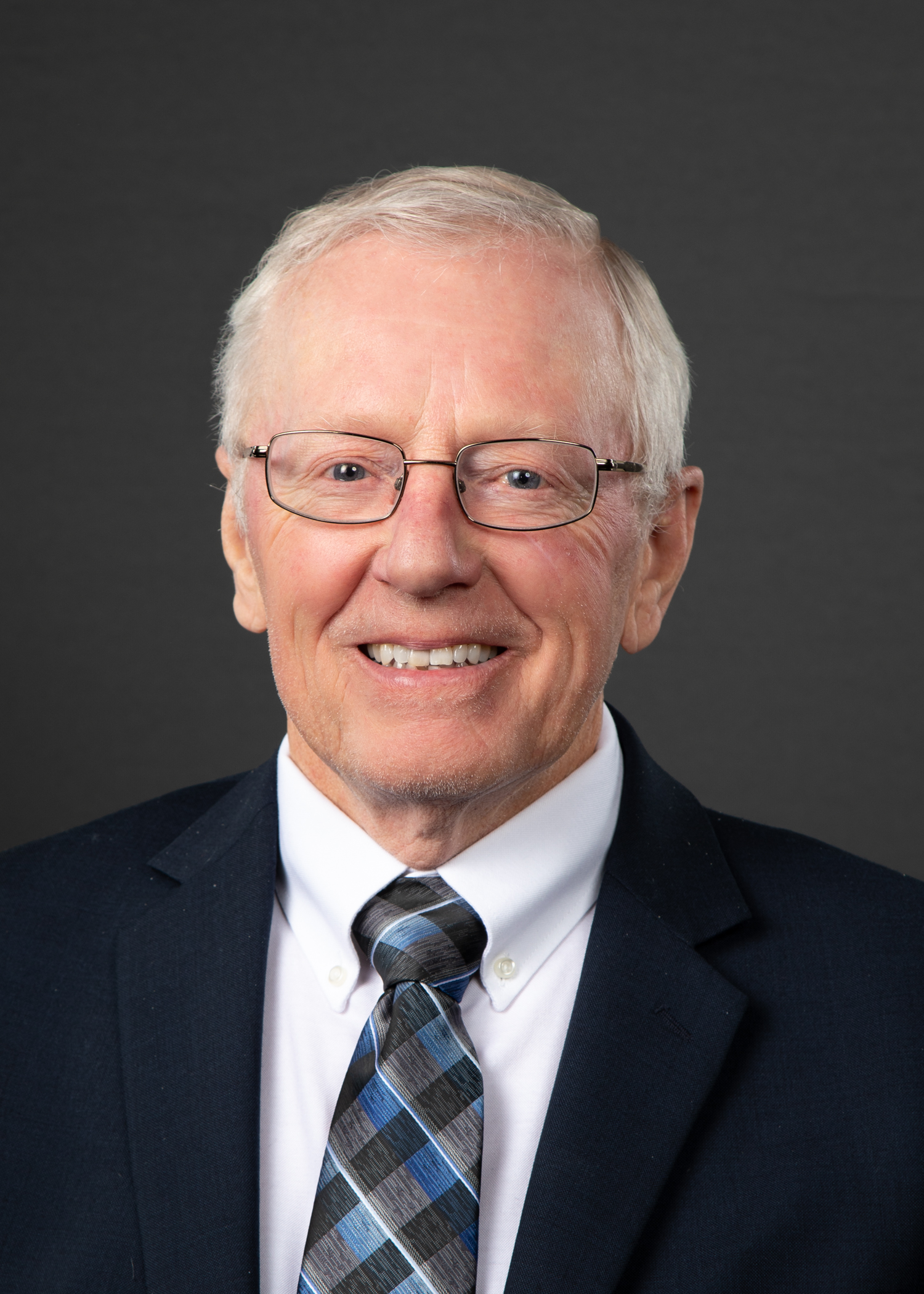
- Carlson in 2022

Member of the Iowa House of Representatives from the 13th district
- In office January 9, 2023 – January 12, 2025
- Preceded by: Chris Hall (redistricting)
- Succeeded by: Travis Sitzmann

Personal details
- Born: 1951 (age 74–75) Whiting, Iowa, U.S.
- Party: Republican
- Spouse: Carolyn
- Children: 3
- Education: Buena Vista University

Ken E. Carlson (born 1951) is an American politician, retired teacher and retired farmer who represented the 13th district of the Iowa House of Representatives from 2023 to 2025. Carlson's district included parts of southern Plymouth County, western Cherokee County, eastern Woodbury County and the whole of Monona County. He is a member of the Republican Party.

== Early life ==
Carlson was born in 1951 near Whiting, Iowa, where he was raised. He graduated from Whiting Senior High School and attended Buena Vista University.

== Political career ==
Following decennial redistricting in 2021, Carlson announced his intent to run for the open 13th district seat of the Iowa House of Representatives in March 2022. He was challenged in the Republican primaries on June 7, 2022, by Mark Peters, a farmer and truck driver, whom he defeated by over 300 votes, and defeated Libertarian candidate Amy Janowski in the general election on November 8 by over 8,400 votes.

Carlson served as vice chairman of the Natural Resources Committee, and was also a member of the Agriculture, Economic Growth and Technology, and Veterans Affairs committees.

Carlson endorsed Ron DeSantis for president in 2023. In 2024 he announced that he would not seek reelection.

Carlson has described himself as a constitutional conservative. He opposes abortion and supports the Second Amendment.

== Personal life ==
Carlson has a wife, Carolyn, and three adult children. He resides in Onawa, Iowa. He is a retired farmer and a former math and science public school teacher, having taught for 12 years. He is also an on-call preacher at the Onawa First Christian Church and is a member of the Monona County Farm Bureau, Iowa Corn Growers Association, Iowa Soybean Association and Western Iowa Experimental Farm.

== Electoral history ==
Election	Political result	Candidate	Party	Votes	%
Iowa House of Representatives Republican primary elections, 2022; District 13; Turnout: 2,636	Republican (newly redistricted)	Ken Carlson	Republican	1,488	56.4
Iowa House of Representatives Republican primary elections, 2022; District 13; Turnout: 2,636	Republican (newly redistricted)	Mark Peters	Republican	1,140	43.2
Iowa House of Representatives Republican primary elections, 2022; District 13; Turnout: 2,636	Republican (newly redistricted)	Other/Write-in votes		8	0.3
Iowa House of Representatives general elections, 2022; District 13; Turnout: 11,897	Republican (newly redistricted)	Ken Carlson	Republican	10,157	85.4
Iowa House of Representatives general elections, 2022; District 13; Turnout: 11,897	Republican (newly redistricted)	Amy Janowski	Libertarian	1,703	14.3
Iowa House of Representatives general elections, 2022; District 13; Turnout: 11,897	Republican (newly redistricted)	Other/Write-in votes		37	0.3
