= Whiting Community School District =

Public school district in Whiting, Iowa, United States

Coordinates: 42.126565°N 96.156323°W

Location
- Whiting, Iowa Monona United States
- Coordinates: 42.126565, -96.156323

District information
- Type: Local school district
- Grades: K–12
- Superintendent: Randy Collins
- Schools: 2
- Budget: $3,732,000 (2020-21)
- NCES District ID: 1931620

Students and staff
- Students: 170 (2022-23)
- Teachers: 22.41 FTE
- Staff: 20.59 FTE
- Student–teacher ratio: 7.59
- Athletic conference: Frontier Conference - Nebraska
- District mascot: Warriors
- Colors: Red and white

Other information
- Website: www.whitingcsd.org

The Whiting Community School District is a rural public school district headquartered in Whiting, Iowa. It is completely within Monona County, and serves the town of Whiting and the surrounding rural areas.

Randy Collins has been the superintendent since 2016, sharing duties at Akron–Westfield and Lawton–Bronson. He replaced Jeff Thelander at both Whiting and Lawton–Bronson.

== Schools ==
The district operates two schools, both in Whiting:

- Whiting Elementary School
- Whiting Senior High School

=== Whiting Senior High School ===
==== Athletics ====
The Warriors compete in the Frontier Conference - Nebraska in the following sports:

- Volleyball
- Football
- Basketball
- Track and field
- Baseball
- Softball

== Notable alumni ==
- Ken Carlson (born 1951), member of the Iowa House of Representatives

== See also ==
- List of school districts in Iowa
- List of high schools in Iowa
