= Michael J. Quigley =

Michael J. Quigley USN, MStJ
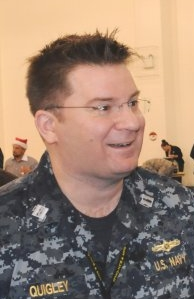
- Michael J. Quigley
- Occupations: Naval officer, intelligence and counter-terrorism analyst; national security policy advisor
- Organization(s): Venerable Order of St. John, Priory of the United States Baker Street Irregulars
- Known for: assisted the Senate Inquiry into the CIA's use of torture High Value Detainee Interrogator at Guantanamo Bay, Cuba (2006–2007)
- Awards: Bronze Star Medal Joint Service Commendation Medal Army Commendation Medal (w/ bronze oak leaf cluster) Joint Service Achievement Medal (w/ three bronze oak leaf clusters) Navy-Marine Corps Achievement Medal Army Achievement Medal (w/ bronze oak leaf cluster) Combat Action Ribbon Joint Meritorious Unit Award (with silver oak leaf cluster) Army Superior Unit Award Army Reserve Component Achievement Medal (w/ two bronze oak leaf clusters) National Defense Service Medal (w/ bronze star) Armed Forces Expeditionary Medal; Iraq Campaign Medal (w/ three bronze stars) Global War on Terrorism Expecitionary Medal Global War on Terrorism Service Medal Humanitarian Service Medal (w/ two bronze stars) Military Outstanding Volunteer Service Medal Navy-Marine Corps Overseas Service Ribbon (w/ bronze star) Armed Forces Reserve Service Medal (w/ gold hourglass, bronze “M” device, and “4” device) Army NCO Professional Development Ribbon Army Service Ribbon; Army Reserve Overseas Service Ribbon (w/ bronze “2” device) NATO Medal (Former Yugoslavia) Order of St. John Medal (UK) Navy Expert Rifle Marksmanship Medal Navy Expert Pistol Marksmanship Medal Information Dominance Warfare Officer qualification pin Secretary of Defense Identification Badge Joint Chiefs of Staff Identification Badge
- Honours: Venerable Order of St. John, Member Sovereign Military Order of Malta, Knight of Magistral Grace Equestrian Order of the Holy Sepulchre, Knight Commander

Michael J. Quigley is a lieutenant commander in the United States Navy assigned to the Office of the Secretary of Defense in the Pentagon. He is a former member of the United States Army and an officer in the United States Navy Reserve. Once a senior high-value detainee interrogator, he now addresses the human rights implications of counter-terrorism operations and the USA's use of torture and other inhumane and coercive interrogation techniques. Quigley enlisted in the United States Army in 1989, becoming a military policeman after a short time as a foot soldier. After transferring from the military police corps to military intelligence, Quigley became one of the Army's most skilled and experienced interrogators and experts in counter-terrorism. In 1998 Quigley served as an advisor to Senator George Mitchell, when Mitchell was assisting in the negotiations that ended the United Kingdom's strife with the Irish Republican Army—resulting in the "Good Friday Peace Accords".

While serving in Iraq, during Operation Enduring Freedom, Quigley left the Army and accepted a direct commission into the United States Navy Reserve in August 2003. Following his deployment in Iraq Quigley accepted a job as a civilian counter-terrorism analyst at the Defense Intelligence Agency. Quigley was part of a team assigned to interrogate the "high-value detainees" at Guantanamo, including Abd'l Hadi al-Iraqi, a senior leader of al-Qaeda, and formerly a captive held by the CIA. In 2009, based on his extensive experience as an interrogator, Quigley was seconded to aid the United States Senate Intelligence Committee as it conducted an inquiry into the CIA's use of torture and other experimental interrogation techniques. In June 2013, Quigley became a Senior Fellow at Human Rights First.

As a specialist in interrogation and counter-terrorism Quigley has briefed subcommittees of the United States Congress.

Notably, Quigley also took a leadership role in organizing volunteers from the US military to go and aid victims of Hurricane Sandy, a destructive hurricane that struck the coast of New Jersey in 2012.

Quigley is a member of the Baker Street Irregulars literary society dedicated to the study of Sherlock Holmes, Dr. Watson, Sir Arthur Conan Doyle, and the Victorian world.
