= Travis Sitzmann =

American politician

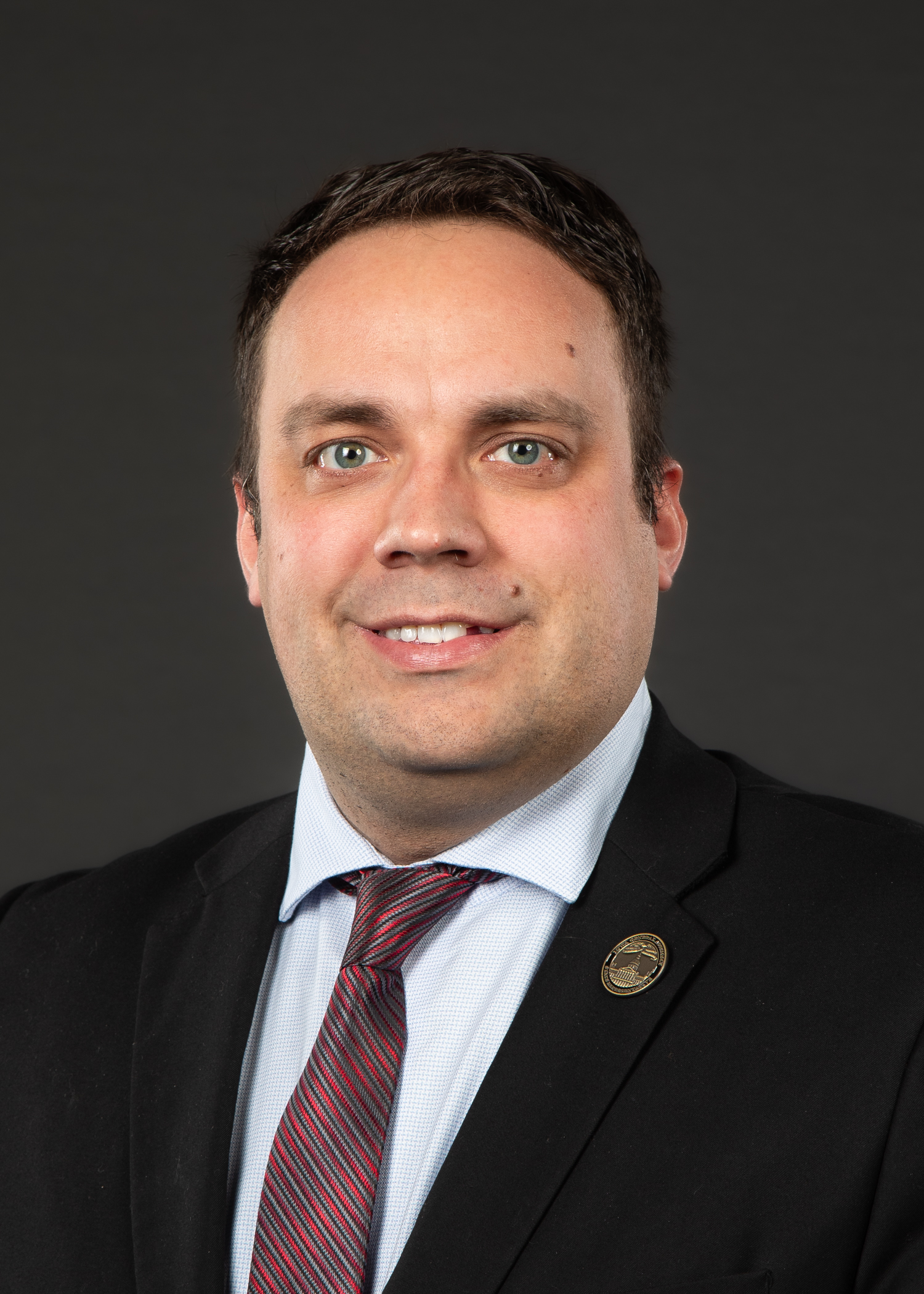

Member of the Iowa House of Representatives from the 13th district
- Incumbent
- Assumed office January 13, 2025
- Preceded by: Ken Carlson

Personal details
- Born: May 26, 1990 (age 36) Le Mars, Iowa
- Party: Republican
- Website: Representative Sitzmann

Travis M. Sitzmann is an American businessman and politician, currently serving as an Iowa House Representative from District 13.

== Personal life, education, and early career ==
Sitzmann's grandfather served three terms as a Plymouth County supervisor.

Sitzmann was born and raised near Le Mars, Iowa, and attended Gehlen Catholic High School and the University of Northern Iowa, where he earned a degree in political science. After graduating from UNI, Sitzmann worked successively for Wells Enterprises and SmithCo Manufacturing in environmental health and safety, and The Travelers Companies as a risk consultant.

Sitzmann now lives in Kingsley, Iowa.

== Political career ==
Sitzmann was a Plymouth County reserve sheriff's deputy. Sitzmann defeated Noah Wieseler in the Republican Party primary for Iowa House District 13 in 2024. Sitzmann won the general election as well, against the Democratic Party candidate Rosanne Plante and political independent Parker Hansen. In July 2025, Sitzmann began campaigning for reelection. He was unopposed during the June 2026 primary.
