= South Jordan Cemetery =

Cemetery in Iowa, United States

- U.S. National Register of Historic Places
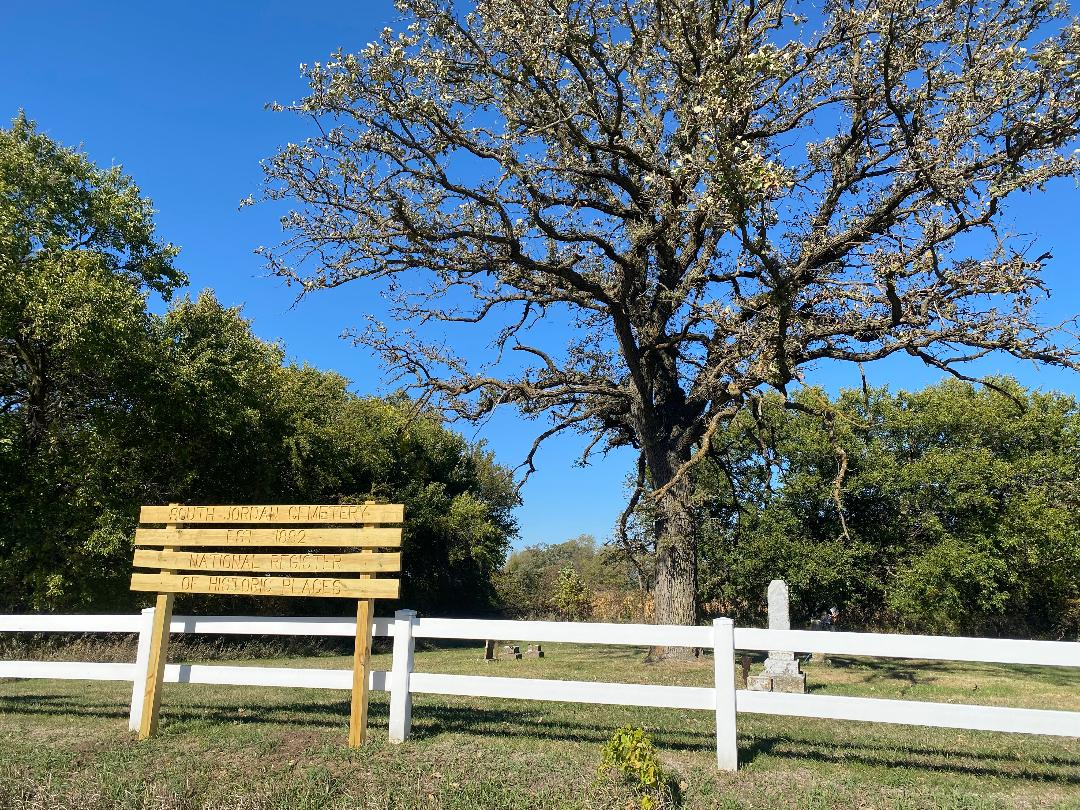

- Location within Iowa Location within the United States
- Location: 33928 260th St.
- Nearest city: Moorhead, Iowa
- Coordinates: 41°58′46″N 95°53′09″W
- NRHP reference No.: 100006221
- Added to NRHP: March 5, 2021

South Jordan Cemetery, also known as the Black Cemetery or the Negro Cemetery, is a historic site located north of Moorhead in rural Monona County, Iowa, United States. It was listed on the National Register of Historic Places in 2021.

== Description ==
The cemetery is the burial site for about twenty people, most of whom are African American. While an influx of Blacks into rural Iowa was an anomaly, there are a couple of theories as to how the African Americans made it to this part of western Iowa. One legend said they were former slaves that came by way of the Underground Railroad, but because this settlement was most definitely post–Civil War that seems unlikely. There is speculation that they were Exodusters who came up from the American South and settled initially in Kansas before moving to Nebraska and then into Iowa. What is known is that they came to work for Adam Miers, an Ohio native who settled here in 1856. Even though the African Americans kept to themselves, their presence was not welcome by many of the Caucasian residents. While some intermarried, a group from Belvidere, now a ghost town, petitioned the court to have the African Americans removed. Monona County's Black population was 88 in the 1880s before it declined to 23 in the 1890 census, six in 1900, and zero in 1910. It's possible that many moved to Sioux City to work in the factories there.

Of the 20 burials in the cemetery, all but one occurred between the early 1880s and 1907. A Caucasian woman was buried here in 1988. Both of Adam Miers' wives are buried here. His first wife, Elizabeth, was Caucasian. His second wife, Mariah, is thought to be a woman of color. It is unknown where Adam Miers is buried, but it is possible he is buried here. Only half of the graves have markers, and some are illegible. Some of the markers were vandalized a couple of decades ago.
