= Jones Creek Watershed Historic District =

Historic district in Iowa, United States

- U.S. National Register of Historic Places
- U.S. Historic district
- Location within Iowa Location within the United States
- Location: Between the Little Sioux and Soldier Rivers, southwest of Moorhead
- Coordinates: 41°54′28″N 95°55′30″W
- Area: 1,400 acres (570 ha)
- Built: 1937/38-1942
- MPS: Conservation Movement in Iowa MPS
- NRHP reference No.: 91001839
- Added to NRHP: December 23, 1991

The Jones Creek Watershed Historic District is a nationally recognized historic district located southwest of Moorhead, Iowa, United States. It was listed on the National Register of Historic Places in 1991. At the time of its nomination it contained 19 resources, which included eight contributing structures, nine non-contributing buildings, and two non-contributing structures. The historic district is made up of eight gully control dams erected by the Civilian Conservation Corps (CCC) Camp DPE-79, working for the Soil Conservation Service (SCS). They were built between 1937 (or 1938) and 1941. The project was completed by crews from the conscientious objector camp in Denison in late 1941 and 1942.

This was one of the first watershed protection projects that SCS took up in the United States, and the first in the State of Iowa. No planning documents could be found among the CCC and SCS official records. The planning for the project appears to have begun when the CCC was developing the newly created Preparation Canyon State Park nearby. Informal discussions were held between SCS engineer Robert Mayberry, local farmer Roy McCue, and CCC camp superintendent Ray Jones. At the time federally funded soil conservation work on private land was considered an inappropriate use of taxpayer money. The Emergency Relief Appropriation Act of 1939 changed that while this project was already under way. Such projects could be undertaken as long as the projects were sponsored by conservation districts or similar bodies that were organized by the states for soil erosion control and conservation purposes. The local farmers in this project had already been organized in the Soldier-Maple Valley Soil Conservation District. Monona and neighboring Harrison County also had a long history of working together on flood control projects.

The dams in this project were built to stabilize upland soils that were being eroded because of current farming practices at that time. The SCS also helped individual farmers convert from planting straight-rows of crops to contour farming on terraced benches. At the same time 80 acres (32 ha) of badly eroded land were taken out of cultivation and placed into pasture or planted with trees.
