= Mann School No. 2 =

- U.S. National Register of Historic Places
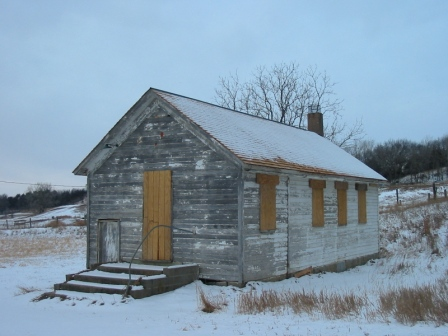

- Location within Iowa Location within the United States
- Location: Oak Ave, 3.5 miles northwest of the entrance to Preparation Canyon State Park
- Nearest city: Moorhead, Iowa
- Coordinates: 41°55′47.7″N 95°57′12″W
- Built: 1884
- NRHP reference No.: 00001655
- Added to NRHP: January 16, 2001

Mann School No. 2, also known as Sioux Township #2, is a historic building located west of Moorhead, Iowa, United States. Built in 1884, the building is a simple rectangular frame structure with a gable roof. Originally three bays long, an addition in the 1920s that added a cloak room and internal stairway to the basement, extended it one more bay. Located in the Loess Hills, this school differed from one-room schoolhouses on the prairie, in that it was located near the center of a cluster of families rather than at the center of four sections. Parents of the students who were educated here took responsibility for the upkeep and maintenance of the building and grounds. The building remained in use as a school until 1945 when the teacher expectantly left. Enrollment had been low to begin with so the district sent the students to a neighboring rural school and then to Moorhead. The building continued as a polling place after the school was formally closed in 1945. It was listed on the National Register of Historic Places in 2001.
