= John C. Mendenhall =

American politician (1904–1976)

John Cecil Mendenhall (20 January 1904 – 18 October 1976) was an American politician.

John Mendenhall was born in Ponca, Nebraska, on 20 January 1904 to parents Ivan Mendenhall and Lena Mulle. He graduated high school in 1922 and studied business and commercial law at the Sioux City Business College. He ran a construction business in New Albin from 1927 to 1967, specializing primarily in concrete production and related fields. Mendenhall was a member of the United Methodist Church and served the local church in a number of administrative and lay leadership positions. He was also a Freemason.

Mendenhall was affiliated with the Republican Party. He served twenty-two years on the New Albin city council and occupied the mayoralty for fifteen years. Mendenhall was then elected a member of the Iowa House of Representatives from 1969 to 1975, serving one term each for District 90, District 13 and District 17. After leaving the state legislature, Mendenhall continued his career in public service on several municipal and county-level organizations. He died of a heart attack in the backyard of his New Albin home on 18 October 1976.
