= Christ Cella =

- Interactive map of Christ Cella

Restaurant information
- Closed: 1995
- Location: 160 East 46th Street, New York, New York, 10017, United States
- Coordinates: 40°45′12.7″N 73°58′24″W

Christ Cella was a Manhattan steakhouse that was a “pillar in the pantheon of New York steakhouses.” It went out of business in 1995 and in August, it was sold to restaurateur Ken Aretsky.

Christ Cella was founded in 1926 by Christopher Cella and was eventually sold by his son Richard. It started as a speakeasy on East 45th Street before moving to 160 East 46th Street in 1955. Another source says it opened in 1923.
