= Whiting, Iowa =

- City
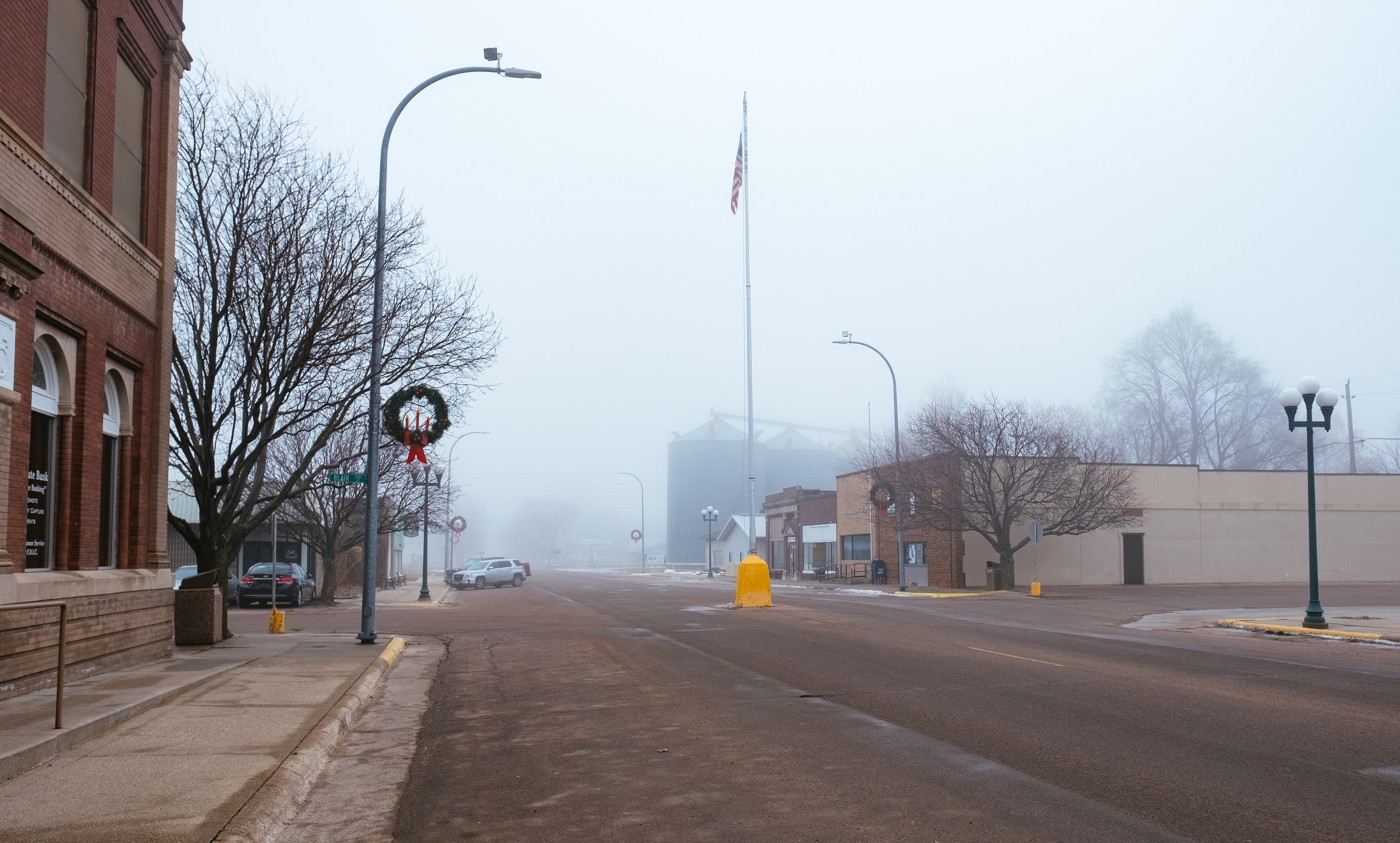
- Whittier Street looking East

- Location of Whiting, Iowa
- Coordinates: 42°07′32″N 96°09′02″W
- Country: USA
- State: Iowa
- County: Monona

Area
  - Total: 1.02 sq mi (2.63 km^{2})
  - Land: 1.02 sq mi (2.63 km^{2})
  - Water: 0 sq mi (0.00 km^{2})
- Elevation: 1,063 ft (324 m)

Population (2020)
  - Total: 745
  - Density: 732.6/sq mi (282.84/km^{2})
- Time zone: UTC-6 (Central (CST))
  - Summer (DST): UTC-5 (CDT)
- ZIP code: 51063
- Area code: 712
- FIPS code: 19-85215
- GNIS feature ID: 2397305

Whiting is a city in Monona County, Iowa, United States. The population was 745 at the time of the 2020 census.

== History ==
A post office called Whiting has been in operation since 1873. The city was named for Charles E. Whiting, a local farmer.

== Geography ==
According to the United States Census Bureau, the city has a total area of 1.00 square mile (2.59 km^{2}), all land.

== Demographics ==
Historical populations
Year	Pop.	±%
1880	56	—
1890	437	+680.4%
1900	572	+30.9%
1910	576	+0.7%
1920	625	+8.5%
1930	627	+0.3%
1940	688	+9.7%
1950	663	−3.6%
1960	595	−10.3%
1970	590	−0.8%
1980	734	+24.4%
1990	683	−6.9%
2000	707	+3.5%
2010	762	+7.8%
2020	745	−2.2%
Source:"U.S. Census website". United States Census Bureau. and Iowa Data Center; Source: U.S. Decennial Census

=== 2020 census ===
As of the census of 2020, there were 745 people, 307 households, and 179 families residing in the city. The population density was 732.6 inhabitants per square mile (282.8/km^{2}). There were 343 housing units at an average density of 337.3 per square mile (130.2/km^{2}). The racial makeup of the city was 85.0% White, 0.4% Black or African American, 2.1% Native American, 0.5% Asian, 0.0% Pacific Islander, 1.2% from other races and 10.7% from two or more races. Hispanic or Latino persons of any race comprised 12.9% of the population.

Of the 307 households, 28.3% of which had children under the age of 18 living with them, 42.0% were married couples living together, 8.5% were cohabitating couples, 30.0% had a female householder with no spouse or partner present and 19.5% had a male householder with no spouse or partner present. 41.7% of all households were non-families. 35.5% of all households were made up of individuals, 19.2% had someone living alone who was 65 years old or older.

The median age in the city was 45.5 years. 23.9% of the residents were under the age of 20; 3.4% were between the ages of 20 and 24; 22.6% were from 25 and 44; 24.0% were from 45 and 64; and 26.2% were 65 years of age or older. The gender makeup of the city was 45.5% male and 54.5% female.

=== 2010 census ===
As of the census of 2010, there were 762 people, 313 households, and 195 families living in the city. The population density was 762.0 inhabitants per square mile (294.2/km^{2}). There were 340 housing units at an average density of 340.0 per square mile (131.3/km^{2}). The racial makeup of the city was 96.7% White, 0.1% African American, 1.6% Native American, 0.1% Asian, 0.8% from other races, and 0.7% from two or more races. Hispanic or Latino of any race were 2.0% of the population.

There were 313 households, of which 27.8% had children under the age of 18 living with them, 46.3% were married couples living together, 13.1% had a female householder with no husband present, 2.9% had a male householder with no wife present, and 37.7% were non-families. 33.2% of all households were made up of individuals, and 17.6% had someone living alone who was 65 years of age or older. The average household size was 2.20 and the average family size was 2.76.

The median age in the city was 49 years. 20.2% of residents were under the age of 18; 6.2% were between the ages of 18 and 24; 18.3% were from 25 to 44; 28.2% were from 45 to 64; and 27% were 65 years of age or older. The gender makeup of the city was 43.4% male and 56.6% female.

=== 2000 census ===
As of the census of 2000, there were 707 people, 301 households, and 189 families living in the city. The population density was 705.1 inhabitants per square mile (272.2/km^{2}). There were 316 housing units at an average density of 315.1 per square mile (121.7/km^{2}). The racial makeup of the city was 97.60% White, 0.99% Native American, 0.28% from other races, and 1.13% from two or more races. Hispanic or Latino of any race were 1.56% of the population.

There were 301 households, out of which 30.9% had children under the age of 18 living with them, 51.8% were married couples living together, 9.6% had a female householder with no husband present, and 37.2% were non-families. 33.9% of all households were made up of individuals, and 19.9% had someone living alone who was 65 years of age or older. The average household size was 2.35 and the average family size was 3.02.

In the city, the population was spread out, with 26.2% under the age of 18, 8.6% from 18 to 24, 25.6% from 25 to 44, 18.5% from 45 to 64, and 21.1% who were 65 years of age or older. The median age was 40 years. For every 100 females, there were 91.6 males. For every 100 females age 18 and over, there were 83.2 males.

The median income for a household in the city was $32,212, and the median income for a family was $43,365. Males had a median income of $31,827 versus $23,000 for females. The per capita income for the city was $16,284. About 6.8% of families and 8.8% of the population were below the poverty line, including 9.6% of those under age 18 and 3.4% of those age 65 or over.

== Education ==
The Whiting Community School District operates local public schools.

== Media ==
The movie Children of the Corn was filmed mostly in the vicinity of Whiting.

== Notable people ==
- Ken Carlson (born 1951), member of the Iowa House of Representatives
