= Ingemann Danish Lutheran Church =

- Ingemann Danish Evangelical Lutheran Church and Cemetery
- U.S. National Register of Historic Places
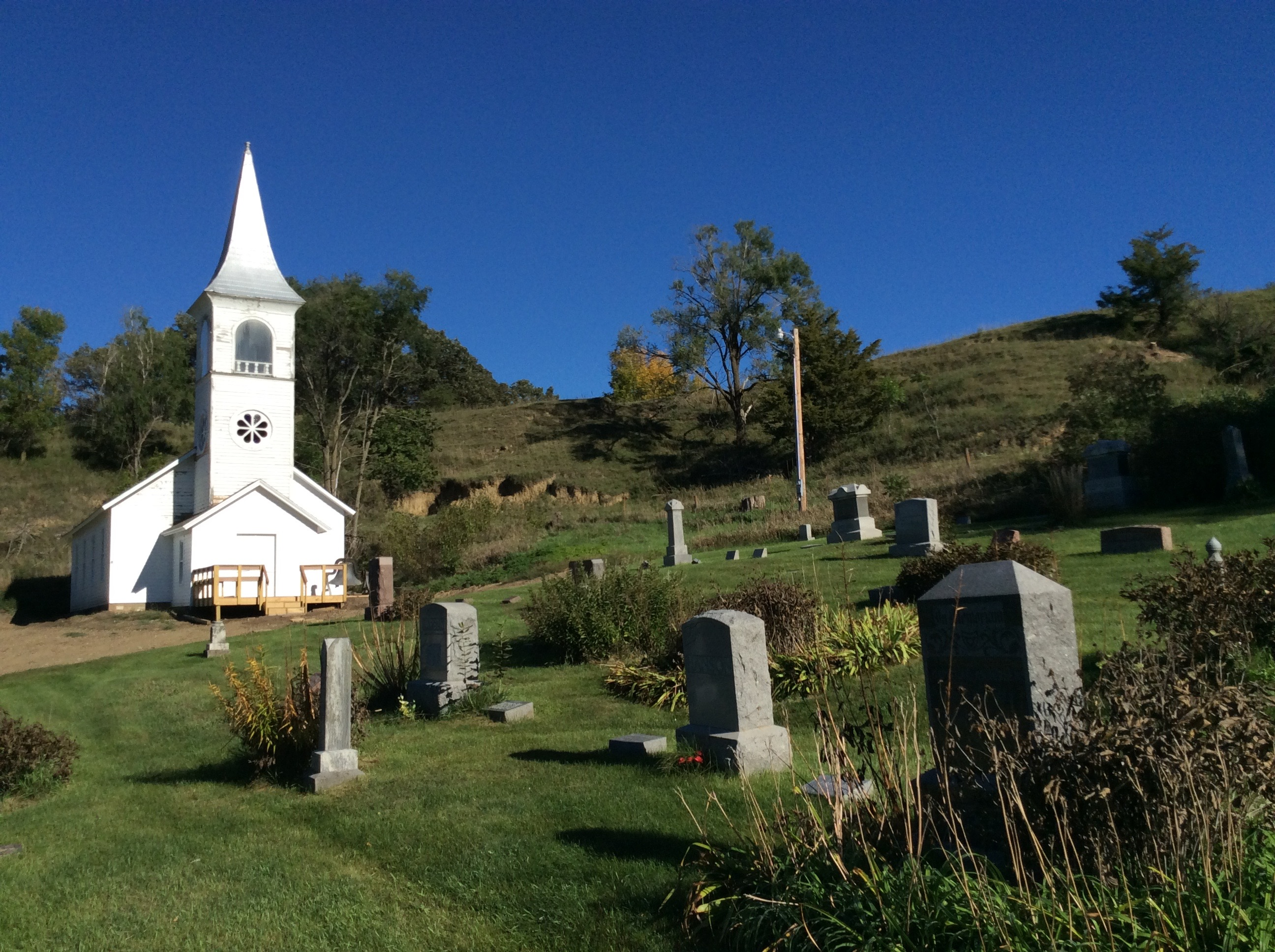

- Location within Iowa Location within the United States
- Location: 32044 County Road E54
- Nearest city: Moorhead, Iowa
- Coordinates: 41°56′18.7″N 95°55′36.5″W
- Area: 2.5 acres (1.0 ha)
- Built: 1884
- Built by: Andrew J. Simonson
- Architectural style: Late Victorian
- NRHP reference No.: 12000779
- Added to NRHP: September 10, 2012

Ingemann Danish Lutheran Church, also known as the Lower Danish Church, is a historic building located west of Moorhead, Iowa, United States. It and adjacent cemetery were listed on the National Register of Historic Places in 2001.

== History ==
The area west of Moorhead had a high enough concentration of Danish immigrants that it became known as "Dane Hollow." The Rev. G.B. Christiansen from Blair, Nebraska organized the Ingemann Lutheran congregation in 1882, and services were held in the Townley Country School and family homes. It was named for Bernhard Severin Ingemann, a Danish novelist and poet who became known for his hymns with a general spiritual and religious interest rather than Biblical dogma. The church was built in 1884 on land donated by John and Anna Marie (Nielsen) Johnson who were natives of Hedensted, Denmark. They donated 20 acres (8.1 ha) of the first 40 acres (16 ha) they bought. The land provided enough space to build a church, cemetery, parsonage, and outbuildings. The church was a plain white, gabled, frame building. The foyer and tower were designed and built by Andrew J. Simonsen in 1904.

Christina (Beck) Swanson, wife of Neals P. Swanson, was the first person buried in the cemetery in 1884. She, like the others who were buried there, immigrated to the United States from Denmark in the 1880s to early 1890s. The largest percentage of immigrants in Dane Hollow came from Horsens and Klakring, but they came from other areas of Jutland and from some of the islands as well. A few of the people buried in the cemetery were natives of Sweden and either moved to Denmark after their birth or married Danes.

The pastor and a few members of the congregation split from Ingemann Church and formed Bethesda Lutheran Church in 1894. This split happened during the larger split in the Danish Lutheran Church. Ingemann became a Grundtvigian congregation, and became known as the "Lower Danish Church" because it sits in a valley. Bethesda became an Inner Mission congregation, and became known as the "Upper Danish Church" because it sat on a hill one mile south of Ingemann. Services were held in Danish until 1918 when Iowa Governor William L. Harding forbid the use of foreign languages in public places, over the telephone, in school, and in religious services. About that same time the congregation at Ingemann grew too small for its own pastor, and services were reduced to a monthly basis. Ingemann and Bethesda formed a joint congregation under the leadership of Pastor F.W. Thomsen in 1948. They built a new Bethesda Church in Moorhead using good lumber salvaged from the old Bethesda Church, which was torn down at that time. The last baptism and confirmation in Ingemann Church were held in 1954.

The historic church is maintained by the Ingemann Danish Lutheran Church Preservation Society. The property has been reduced over the years to 2.5 acres (1.0 ha), which is occupied by the church and cemetery. Services are held on Memorial Day, reunions and a few weddings.
