= David F. Musto =

American expert on U.S. drug policy (1936-2010)

David Franklin Musto
- Born: January 8, 1936; Tacoma, Washington, United States
- Died: October 8, 2010 (aged 74); Shanghai, China
- Occupations: author, editor, advisor
- Spouse: Jeanne
- Children: 1 daughter and 3 sons
- Writing career
- Subject: Drug policy
- Notable work: The American Disease: Origins of Narcotic Control

David Franklin Musto (January 8, 1936 – October 8, 2010) was an American expert on U.S. drug policy and the war on drugs who served as a government adviser on the subject during the Presidency of Jimmy Carter. He wrote extensively on the history of licit and illicit drugs and the process by which many of them were placed under governmental control.

== Education ==
Musto was born January 8, 1936, in Tacoma, Washington and earned his undergraduate degree in classics from the University of Washington in 1956. He attended Yale University on a fellowship, earning a master's degree in the history of science and medicine in 1961. Musto earned his medical degree from the University of Washington School of Medicine, which was followed by an internship at Pennsylvania Hospital and a residency in psychiatry at Yale.

== Career ==
Musto first developed a focus on drug policy when he became special assistant to the director of the National Institute of Mental Health through the United States Public Health Service. He taught briefly at Johns Hopkins University and became a professor of child psychiatry at the Yale Child Study Center beginning in 1969, in addition to being a professor of the history of medicine at Yale School of Medicine. He was selected in 1973 as a presidential adviser on drug policy, and was named by Jimmy Carter in 1978 to serve on the White House Strategy Council on Drug Abuse. Musto was a supporter of methadone maintenance as a way of weaning heroin addicts from their addiction. He questioned the efficacy of employee drug testing and needle exchange programs. Musto was wary of government efforts to curb drug use, noting that efforts to control drugs arise "from repeated observation of the damage to acquaintances and society" but that a prevention effort "usually comes just after the popularity of drugs has peaked". By 1992 Musto believed that the cocaine epidemic in the U.S. had already hit its peak, but challenged the notion that legalization of cocaine and other drugs would curb their effects on society.

== Books ==
His 1973 book The American Disease: Origins of Narcotic Control, expanded and reissued in 1987 and 1999, presents a history of drug use, abuse and control from the 19th century to the time of publication. Describing the connection between drug prohibition and their use by minority populations, it was written in "a non-polemical tone rare in a field dominated by partisan zealots". The New York Times Book Review called the book "mandatory reading for anyone who wants to understand how we got into our present mess". His 2002 book The Quest for Drug Control: Politics and Federal Policy in a Period of Increasing Substance Abuse, 1963-1981, co-authored with Pamela Korsmeyer, documents the often fragmented approach to drug policy taken by the federal government in the 1960s and 1970s. Additional works edited by Musto on the subject include One Hundred Years of Heroin and Drugs In America: A Documentary History. One of his long-time interests was in Sherlock Holmes, and he was a member of The Baker Street Irregulars. Musto combined that interest with his vocational expertise in the 1968 article "A Study in Cocaine: Sherlock Holmes and Sigmund Freud", which was published in the Journal of the American Medical Association.

== Death ==
A resident of New Haven, Connecticut, Musto was visiting Shanghai, China, in conjunction with the donation of his writings to Shanghai University and to mark the establishment of the Center for International Drug Control Policy Studies. He died there of a heart attack at age 74 on October 8, 2010. He was survived by his wife, Jeanne, a daughter, three sons and four grandchildren.
