= Susan Spicer =

American chef

- Born: Key West, Florida, United States
- Awards: James Beard Award for Best Chef, Food and Wine's Best New Chefs award, Lafcadio Award

Susan Spicer is a New Orleans–based chef, who owns several restaurants in that city, including a take-out food market which doubles as a bakery. She has received several awards, and appeared in the 2009 finale of the Bravo television program Top Chef as a guest judge. Currently she has a partnership with Regina Keever, and together they opened Bayona in 1990, a five star restaurant.

== Career ==
Spicer started her cooking career under the teachings of Chef Daniel Bonnot at the Louis XVI Restaurant in 1970. After spending four months in Paris at the Hotel Sofitel with Chef Roland Durand (Meilleur Ouvrier de France), she traveled back to New Orleans and opened a 60-seat bistro named "Savior Faire" in the St. Charles Hotel. During 1985, she traveled repeatedly to California and Europe for 6 months, returning to work in New Orleans.

In 1986, she opened the "Bistro at Maison de Ville" in the Hotel Maison de Ville. Four years later she formed a partnership with Regina Keever and opened Bayona in a 200-year-old cottage in the French Quarter. This restaurant soon became famous and has been featured in many national and international publications.

From 1997 through 1999, Spicer also owned Spice, Inc., which is a take-out food, bakery, and a cooking class. This became "Wild Flour Breads", which is co-owned with Sandy Whann.

In October 2000, Spicer and three other partners opened a casual bistro-style restaurant called Herbsaint.

Spicer has appeared on several local and national television shows including Top Chef, which is a popular national show on Bravo. She also devotes her time and talents to charities such as Share Our Strength's annual "Taste of the Nation" and the hunger-relief fundraiser "Taste of the NFL". In June 2010 she opened Mondo in the Lakeview neighborhood of New Orleans. The Lakeview neighborhood is near and dear to Spicer's heart, as it is where she has lived for 20 years. In October 2016 she opened Rosedale, off of Canal Blvd., not far from beautiful City Park.

== Awards and ratings ==
In May 1993 Spicer received the James Beard Award, and was also chosen for the Mondavi Culinary Excellence Award in 1995. Bayona, a restaurant she co-owns, received the Ivy Award and was also put into the Nations Restaurant News Fine Dining Hall of Fame in 1998. Bayona also was featured as one of the Top 5 restaurants in New Orleans and received "Five Beans," which is the highest rating from the New Orleans Times-Picayune. In 2010, Spicer was inducted into the James Beard Foundation's Who's Who of Food & Beverage in America.

== Television appearances ==
Spicer appeared on Top Chef during the finale in 2009. She also was loosely the basis for Janette Desautel, a character in the HBO series Treme, a television series depicting post-Katrina New Orleans. Ms. Desautel is the owner of "Desautel's" which is a fictional restaurant that is based in New Orleans. In Season 2, episode 6 of Treme, Spicer is mentioned as a personal friend of Desautel. On NCIS: New Orleans season 2 episode 22 (2016) she appeared as herself.

== Book ==
Spicer wrote a cookbook, entitled Crescent City Cooking: Unforgettable Recipes from Susan Spicer's New Orleans, and was recognized by the International Association of Culinary Professionals with a nomination for Best American Cookbook. It was also awarded Best New Cookbook by New Orleans Magazine. Spicer's book was included in the Best of the Best, as a selection of the top 25 cookbooks of the year.

== Gulf oil spill ==
On June 26, 2010, Spicer filed suit against BP for damages incurred by her restaurant, Bayona.
