= The Baker Street Journal =

Quarterly journal devoted to Sherlock Holmes

- Frequency: Quarterly
- Founder: Edgar W. Smith
- Founded: 1946
- Country: United States
- Based in: New York
- Language: English

The Baker Street Journal is a quarterly magazine devoted to Sherlockiana published by The Baker Street Irregulars. Leslie S. Klinger has called it "the leading publication" in the study of Sherlock Holmes.

== History ==
After the formation of The Baker Street Irregulars in 1934, members would meet at an annual dinner to read papers on the subject of Sherlockian scholarship. In 1944, Edgar W. Smith, the then-head of the BSI, edited and published an anthology of those writings as Profile by Gaslight. Inspired by the publication, Smith began thinking of creating an ongoing academic journal to publish BSI papers. In 1946,The Baker Street Journal was first published. The first issue was lavishly published with Victorian typography, stitched binding and 108 pages of essays, illustrations, and news about Sherlock Holmes. Adrian Conan Doyle initially threatened Smith with a lawsuit for copyright infringement but financial failure ended that incarnation of the magazine in 1949, after a mere thirteen issues, before the Conan Doyle estate could.

In 1951, Edgar W. Smith revived the journal in a more modest form with fewer pages, reduced typescript printing, and more affordable materials and binding. In this form, the quarterly has maintained publication ever since. When Edgar Smith died in 1960 after having edited fifty-three issues and an additional five Christmas Annuals, editorship passed to Dr. Julian Wolff. Wolff had been a Baker Street Irregular since 1944 and had already functioned as an Associate Editor during the original series of thirteen issues. In 1975, the Journal began to be published by Fordham University Press which allowed it to be typeset as the original thirteen issue series had been. Wolff went on to edit the Journal for sixty-six issues, from 1961 until 1977.

By the late 1980s, the Journal had over two thousand subscribers including readers in such diverse locations as Sweden, Denmark, Japan, and Australia.

The editors of the new series of the Journal have been Edgar W. Smith, Julian Wolff, John M. Linsenmeyer, Peter E. Blau, Philip A. Schrefler, William R. Cochran, and Donald K. Pollack. Steven Rothman served as editor for a record 23 years, from 2000 to 2022. The current editor since the Spring 2023 issue is Dan Andriacco.

In 2001, the entire run of the magazine up to that date was released on CD-ROM containing over 16,000 pages. Subsequently, "version 2" of the CD, including all issues through 2011, was released.
