= Onawa, Iowa =

- City
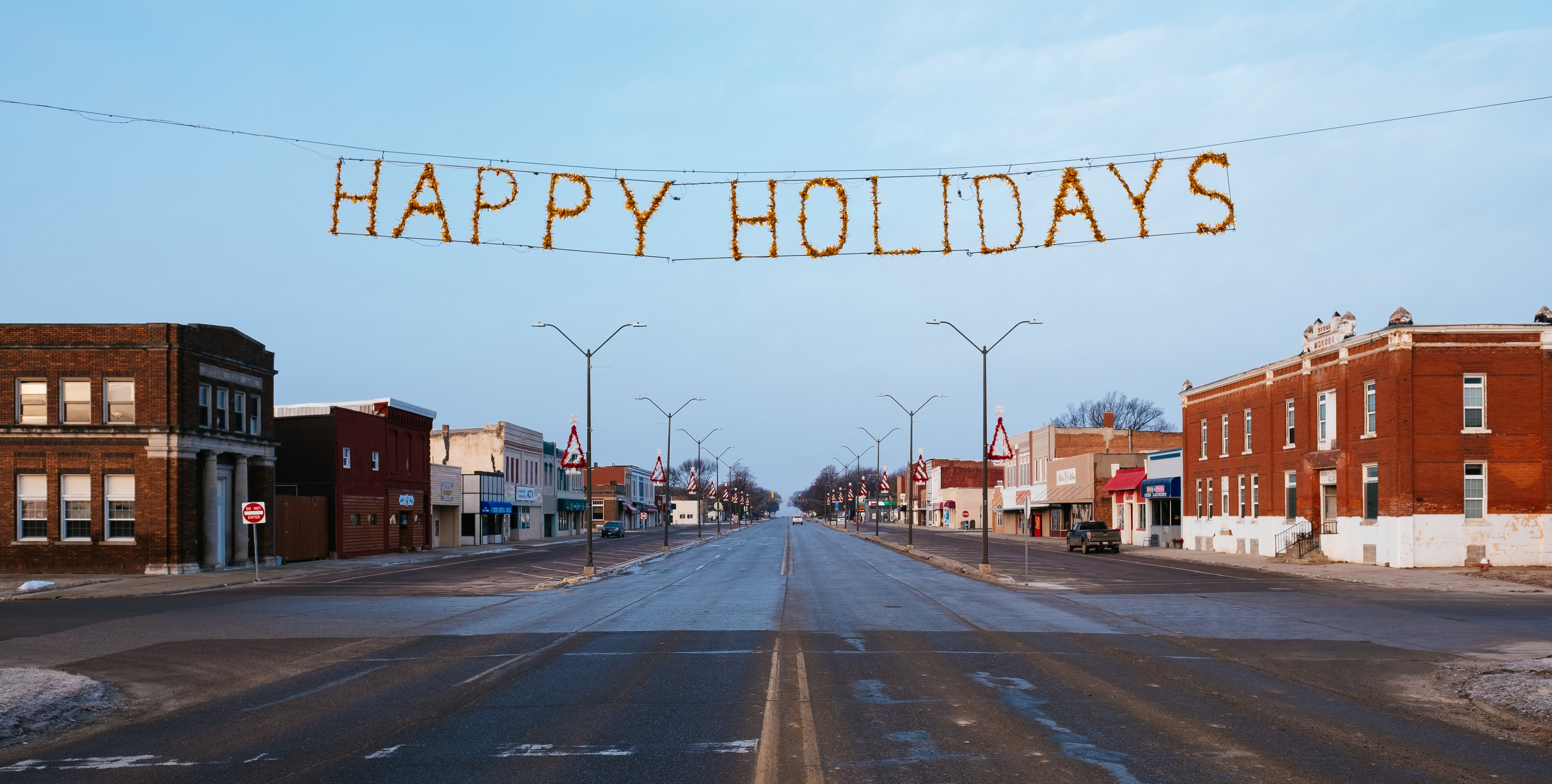
- Onawa viewed from Iowa Avenue during the holidays.

- Location of Onawa, Iowa
- Coordinates: 42°00′43″N 96°06′28″W
- Country: United States
- State: Iowa
- County: Monona

Area
  - Total: 5.27 sq mi (13.64 km^{2})
  - Land: 5.27 sq mi (13.64 km^{2})
  - Water: 0 sq mi (0.00 km^{2})
- Elevation: 1,050 ft (320 m)

Population (2020)
  - Total: 2,906
  - Density: 551.6/sq mi (212.98/km^{2})
- Time zone: UTC-6 (Central (CST))
  - Summer (DST): UTC-5 (CDT)
- ZIP code: 51040
- Area code: 712
- FIPS code: 19-59115
- GNIS feature ID: 468464
- Website: www.onawa.com

Onawa is a city in and the county seat of Monona County, Iowa, United States. The population was 2,906 at the time of the 2020 Census. It is the largest town on the Iowa side of the Missouri River between Council Bluffs and Sioux City.

== History ==
Onawa was named for a character mentioned in the poem The Song of Hiawatha by Henry Wadsworth Longfellow. Onawa was platted in 1857, and the railway arrived to the city in 1867. The city is known for having the widest main street in the continental United States.

Onawa was the site of a prisoner-of-war (POW) camp for captured German soldiers between 1944 and 1946. Historical documents indicate there were never more than 50 POWs in camp. A larger camp existed near the central Iowa town of Algona, and housed as many as 5,400 German POWs.

== Geography ==
According to the United States Census Bureau, the city has a total area of 5.19 square miles (13.44 km^{2}), all land.

Onawa is located in the Loess Hills region of western Iowa, a unique geological and environmental area. Nearby are such natural areas as Lewis & Clark State Park, Preparation Canyon State Park, and the Loess Hills State Forest.

== Demographics ==
Historical populations
| Year | Pop. | ±% |
|---|---|---|
| 1870 | 478 | — |
| 1880 | 882 | +84.5% |
| 1890 | 1,358 | +54.0% |
| 1900 | 1,933 | +42.3% |
| 1910 | 2,026 | +4.8% |
| 1920 | 2,256 | +11.4% |
| 1930 | 2,538 | +12.5% |
| 1940 | 3,438 | +35.5% |
| 1950 | 3,498 | +1.7% |
| 1960 | 3,176 | −9.2% |
| 1970 | 3,154 | −0.7% |
| 1980 | 3,283 | +4.1% |
| 1990 | 2,936 | −10.6% |
| 2000 | 3,091 | +5.3% |
| 2010 | 2,998 | −3.0% |
| 2020 | 2,906 | −3.1% |
Source:"U.S. Census website". United States Census Bureau. and Iowa Data Center; Source: U.S. Decennial Census

=== 2020 census ===
As of the 2020 census, Onawa had a population of 2,906 people, including 1,290 households and 704 families. The population density was 551.6 inhabitants per square mile (213.0/km^{2}), and there were 1,436 housing units at an average density of 272.6 per square mile (105.2/km^{2}).

The median age was 42.0 years. 23.0% of residents were under the age of 18, and 23.2% were 65 years of age or older. For every 100 females, there were 88.9 males, and for every 100 females age 18 and over, there were 88.0 males age 18 and over. The gender makeup of the city was 47.1% male and 52.9% female.

There were 1,290 households, of which 26.6% had children under the age of 18 living in them. Of all households, 38.0% were married-couple households, 8.1% were cohabitating-couple households, 21.3% were households with a male householder and no spouse or partner present, and 32.6% were households with a female householder and no spouse or partner present. 45.4% of households were non-families; 39.8% were one-person households, and 24.5% had someone living alone who was 65 years of age or older.

There were 1,436 housing units, of which 10.2% were vacant. The homeowner vacancy rate was 2.1%, and the rental vacancy rate was 10.1%. 0.0% of residents lived in urban areas, while 100.0% lived in rural areas.

Racial composition as of the 2020 census
| Race | Number | Percent |
|---|---|---|
| White | 2,621 | 90.2% |
| Black or African American | 11 | 0.4% |
| American Indian and Alaska Native | 103 | 3.5% |
| Asian | 14 | 0.5% |
| Native Hawaiian and Other Pacific Islander | 2 | 0.1% |
| Some other race | 13 | 0.4% |
| Two or more races | 142 | 4.9% |
| Hispanic or Latino (of any race) | 55 | 1.9% |

=== 2010 census ===
As of the 2010 Census, there were 2,998 people, 1,345 households, and 756 families living in the city. The population density was 577.6 inhabitants per square mile (223.0/km^{2}). There were 1,519 housing units at an average density of 292.7 per square mile (113.0/km^{2}). The racial makeup of the city was 95.4% non-Hispanic White, 0.4% non-Hispanic Black or African American, 1.7% Native American, 0.3% Asian, 0.1% from other races, and 1.0% from two or more races. Hispanic or Latino people of any race were 1.2% of the population.

There were 1,345 households, of which 25.8% had children under the age of 18 living with them, 41.6% were married couples living together, 9.7% had a female householder with no husband present, 4.9% had a male householder with no wife present, and 43.8% were non-families. Thirty-eight point nine percent of all households were made up of individuals, and 20.9% had someone living alone who was 65 years of age or older. The average household size was 2.18 and the average family size was 2.91.

The median age in the city was 44.8 years. Twenty-three point two of residents were under the age of 18; 6.2% were between the ages of 18 and 24; 20.8% were from 25 to 44; 25.8% were from 45 to 64; and 24% were 65 years of age or older. The gender makeup of the city was 47.5% male and 52.5% female.

=== 2000 census ===
As of the census of 2000, there were 3,091 people, 1,329 households, and 796 families living in the city. The population density was 629.1 inhabitants per square mile (242.9/km^{2}). There were 1,452 housing units at an average density of 295.5 per square mile (114.1/km^{2}). The racial makeup of the city was 97.86% White, 0.03% African American, 1.16% Native American, 0.19% Asian, 0.03% Pacific Islander, 0.03% from other races, and 0.68% from two or more races. 1.07% of the population are Hispanic or Latino of any race.

There were 1,329 households, out of which 25.4% had children under the age of 18 living with them, 47.3% were married couples living together, 9.4% had a female householder with no husband present, and 40.1% were non-families. 35.0% of all households were made up of individuals, and 20.2% had someone living alone who was 65 years of age or older. The average household size was 2.25 and the average family size was 2.89.

Population spread: 22.8% under the age of 18, 6.1% from 18 to 24, 24.4% from 25 to 44, 21.2% from 45 to 64, and 25.4% who were 65 years of age or older. The median age was 42 years. For every 100 females, there were 88.1 males. For every 100 females age 18 and over, there were 83.2 males.

The median income for a household in the city was $34,796, and the median income for a family was $41,250. Males had a median income of $27,981 versus $20,292 for females. The per capita income for the city was $17,928. About 3.3% of families and 6.3% of the population were below the poverty line, including 4.9% of those under age 18 and 8.2% of those age 65 or over.

== Education ==
West Monona Community School District operates public schools serving the community.

== Culture ==
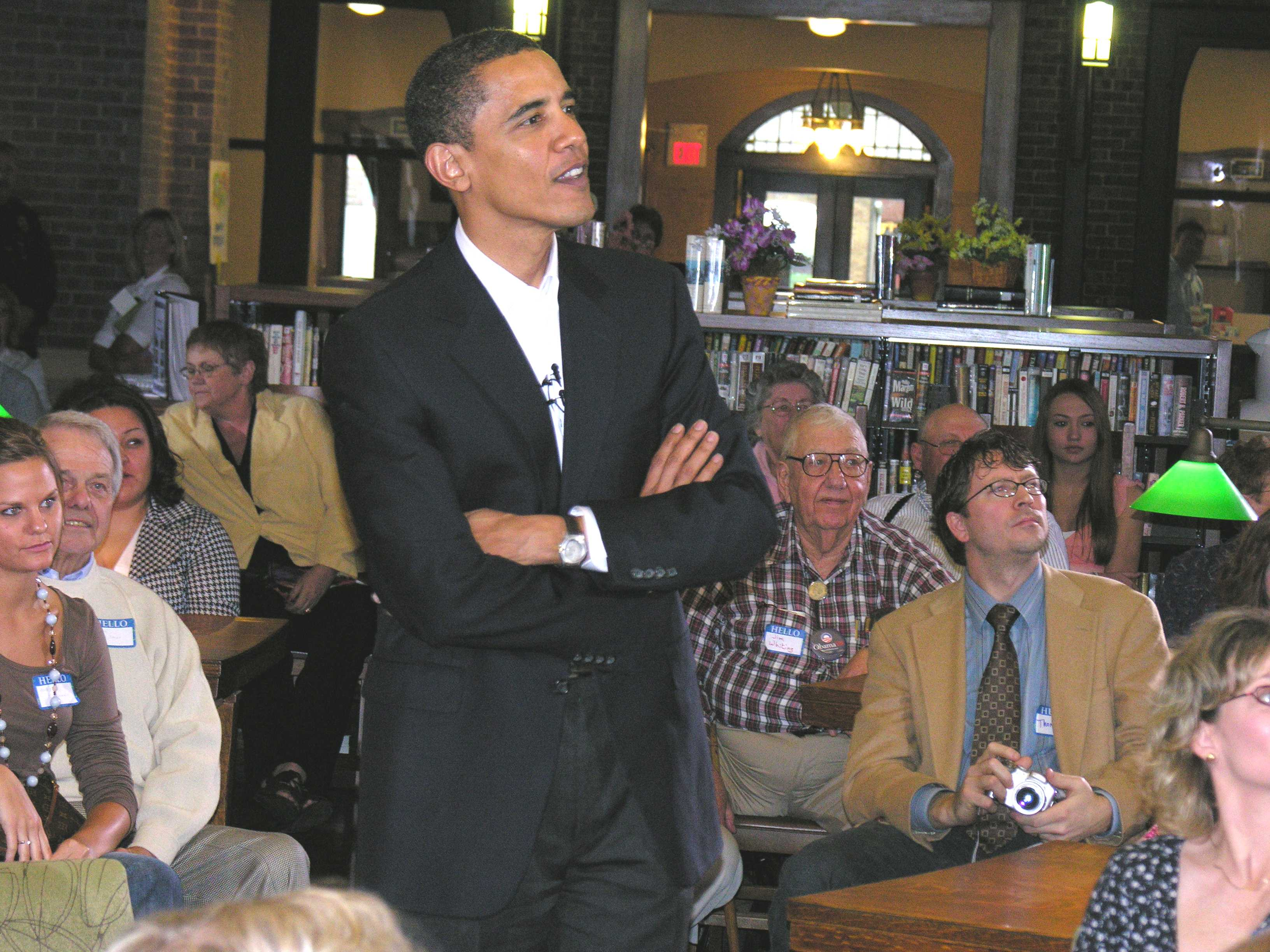
Barack Obama campaigning at the Onawa Public Library, March 2007

The Eskimo Pie was created in Onawa in 1920 by Chris Nelson, an ice cream shop owner.

== Notable people ==
- E. Wight Bakke, educator; born and raised in Onawa
- John Stevens Berry, attorney and author; born and raised in Onawa
- Charles "Buster" Brown, Major League Baseball pitcher
- Ken Carlson, politician; lives in Onawa
- Kristine Jepson, opera singer
- Neil E. McNeil, attorney and justice of Oklahoma Supreme Court, born in Onawa
- Wayne M. Ropes, businessman and Iowa Secretary of State
