= The Adventure of the Stockbroker's Clerk =

Short story by Arthur Conan Doyle featuring Sherlock Holmes

- Short story by Arthur Conan Doyle
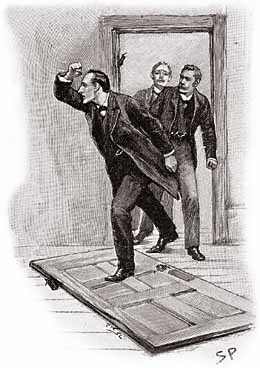
- Holmes breaks into Harry Pinner's office, 1893 Illustration by Sidney Paget in The Strand Magazine
- Country: United Kingdom
- Language: English
- Genre: Detective fiction short stories

Publication
- Published in: Strand Magazine
- Publication date: March 1893

Chronology
- Series: The Memoirs of Sherlock Holmes
The Adventure of the Yellow Face	The Adventure of the Gloria Scott

"The Adventure of the Stockbroker's Clerk" is one of the 56 short Sherlock Holmes stories written by Sir Arthur Conan Doyle. It is the fourth of the twelve collected in The Memoirs of Sherlock Holmes in most British editions of the canon, and third of eleven in most American ones (owing to the omission of the "scandalous" "Adventure of the Cardboard Box"). The story was first published in the UK in The Strand Magazine in March 1893, and in the US in Harper's Weekly in the same month.

== Plot ==
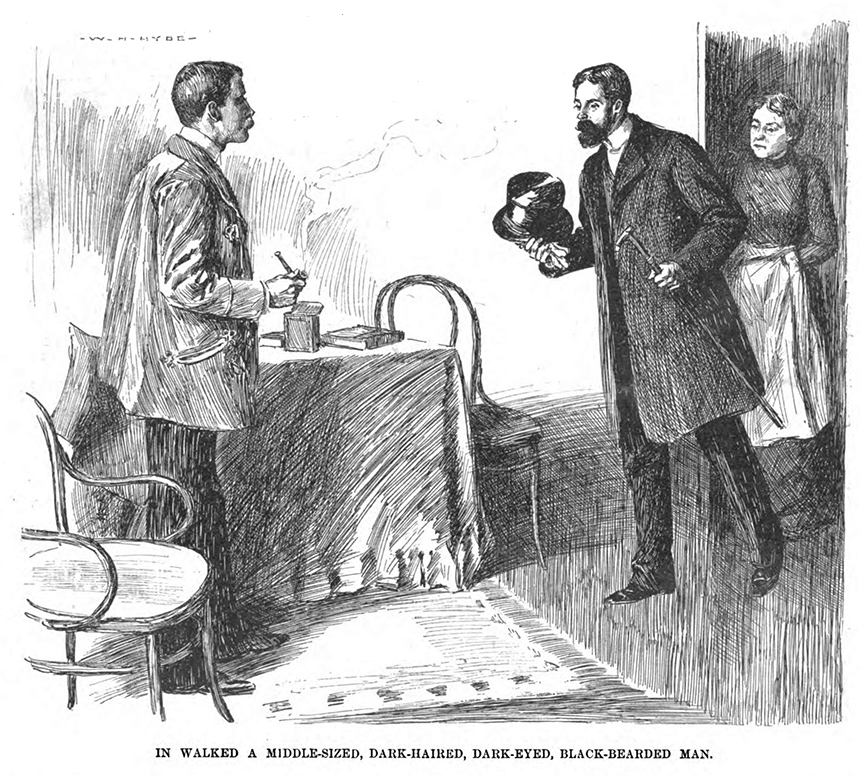
Pycroft meets Arthur Pinner, 1893 illustration by W. H. Hyde in Harper's Weekly

A young clerk, Hall Pycroft, consults Holmes with his suspicions concerning a company that has offered him a very well-paid job. Holmes, Watson and Pycroft travel by train to Birmingham, where the job has so far been based, and Pycroft explains that the London brokerage firm at which he worked had gone out of business, leaving him unemployed. He eventually secured a new post with another such firm in the City, Mawson and Williams's, without an interview. Before taking up the job, he was approached by Arthur Pinner, who offered him a better-paid managership with a newly established hardware distribution company, to be based in France, with a £100 (equivalent to £11,100 in 2025) advance on salary. At Arthur's request, Pycroft wrote a document accepting the position and also agreed not to send a letter of resignation to Mawson's.

Pycroft was sent to Birmingham to meet Arthur's brother Harry, a company co-founder. He immediately commenced his duties, but was concerned about the unprofessional aspects of the business and its sparse offices. Having noticed that both brothers had a gold-filled tooth at the same position in their mouths, he suspected that they might be the same man.

As the trio arrive at the office in Birmingham, with Holmes and Watson presented as fellow job-seekers, Harry goes into shock after buying and reading the evening newspaper. He withdraws and attempts to hang himself, but Watson is able to revive him. Holmes concludes that the story of the brothers is a fabrication and that there is only one "Pinner," who has posed as both of them in the hope that Pycroft might dismiss the similarities between them as a family resemblance. Holmes further deduces that the whole point of the exercise has been to get Pycroft out of London and obtain a sample of his handwriting so that an imposter can gain employment at Mawson's (hence the request for Pycroft to not officially resign his post). The imposter is to break into the company safe and steal the large stockpile of valuable securities kept within.

From the newspaper, they learn that Mawson's has suffered an attempted robbery, culminating in the murder of the weekend watchman and the capture of the thief. Having recently completed a prison sentence, a forger/safecracker named Beddington and his brother concocted the scheme to steal the securities. Beddington took the job intended for Pycroft so he could gain the information needed to carry out the heist, while his brother posed as both Arthur and Harry to keep Pycroft occupied. Bonds worth nearly £100,000 (equivalent to £11,100,000 in 2025) were taken, together with large amounts of scrip in mines and other companies, but the police recovered them from Beddington.

Sending Pycroft out to notify the police so they can come to arrest Beddington's brother, Holmes comments, "Human nature is a strange mixture, Watson. You see that even a villain and murderer can inspire such affection that his brother turns to suicide when he learns that his neck is forfeited."

== Commentary ==
This story's plot is reminiscent of that in "The Red-Headed League", for it, too, involves an elaborate hoax designed to remove an inconvenient person from the scene for a while so that a crime can be committed. The same parallel can be seen in "The Adventure of the Three Garridebs". However, in contrast to these other two cases, the 'inconvenient person' in this case proves insightful enough to realize at least some of the deception on his own accord, whereas the other cases see Holmes being brought in to investigate more peripheral matters.

It is worth noting that Holmes is not involved in the apprehension of the thief, who has already been arrested, but is able to turn the accomplice over to the police.

== Publication history ==
"The Adventure of the Stockbroker's Clerk" was published in the UK in The Strand Magazine in March 1893. It was also published in the US in Harper's Weekly on 11 March 1893, and in the US edition of The Strand Magazine in April 1893. The story was published with seven illustrations by Sidney Paget in the Strand, and with one illustration by W. H. Hyde in Harper's Weekly. It was included in The Memoirs of Sherlock Holmes, which was published in December 1893 in the UK and February 1894 in the US.

== Adaptations ==
=== Film and television ===
The story was adapted as a short film as part of the Stoll film series. The film was released in 1922. It featured Eille Norwood as Holmes and Hubert Willis as Watson, with Olaf Hytten as Pycroft and Aubrey Fitzgerald as Pinner.

In 2018, the story was loosely adapted as "Lily of the Valley," an episode of the HBO Asia/Hulu Japan series Miss Sherlock. In this version, the false job offer is for a research position in a major pharmaceutical company.

=== Audio ===
Edith Meiser adapted the story as an episode of the radio series The Adventures of Sherlock Holmes which aired on 1 December 1930, with Richard Gordon as Sherlock Holmes and Leigh Lovell as Dr. Watson. A remake of the script aired on 11 July 1936 (with Gordon as Holmes and Harry West as Watson).

Edith Meiser also adapted the story as an episode of the radio series The New Adventures of Sherlock Holmes with Basil Rathbone as Holmes and Nigel Bruce as Watson. The episode aired on 9 November 1941.

A 1960 BBC Light Programme radio adaptation, dramatised by Michael Hardwick, aired as part of the 1952–1969 radio series starring Carleton Hobbs as Holmes and Norman Shelley as Watson. The cast also included Desmond Carrington as Pycroft and Hugh Manning as Pinner.

"The Stockbroker's Clerk" was dramatised by Denys Hawthorne for BBC Radio 4 in 1992, as part of the 1989–1998 radio series starring Clive Merrison as Holmes and Michael Williams as Watson. It featured Sean Barrett as Mr Pinner.

The story was adapted as an episode of the radio series The Classic Adventures of Sherlock Holmes, starring John Patrick Lowrie as Holmes and Lawrence Albert as Watson. The episode aired in 2015.

In 2022, the story was adapted as an episode of the radio series Sunday Suspense, starring Mir as Holmes and Deepanjan as Watson.

In 2026, the podcast Sherlock & Co. adapted the story in a three-episode adventure, starring Harry Attwell as Sherlock Holmes, Paul Waggott as Dr. John Watson and Marta da Silva as Mariana "Mrs. Hudson" Ametxazurra. Halena Doughty voices Hayley Pycroft.
