= The Adventure of the Greek Interpreter =

Short story by Arthur Conan Doyle featuring Sherlock Holmes

- Short story by Arthur Conan Doyle
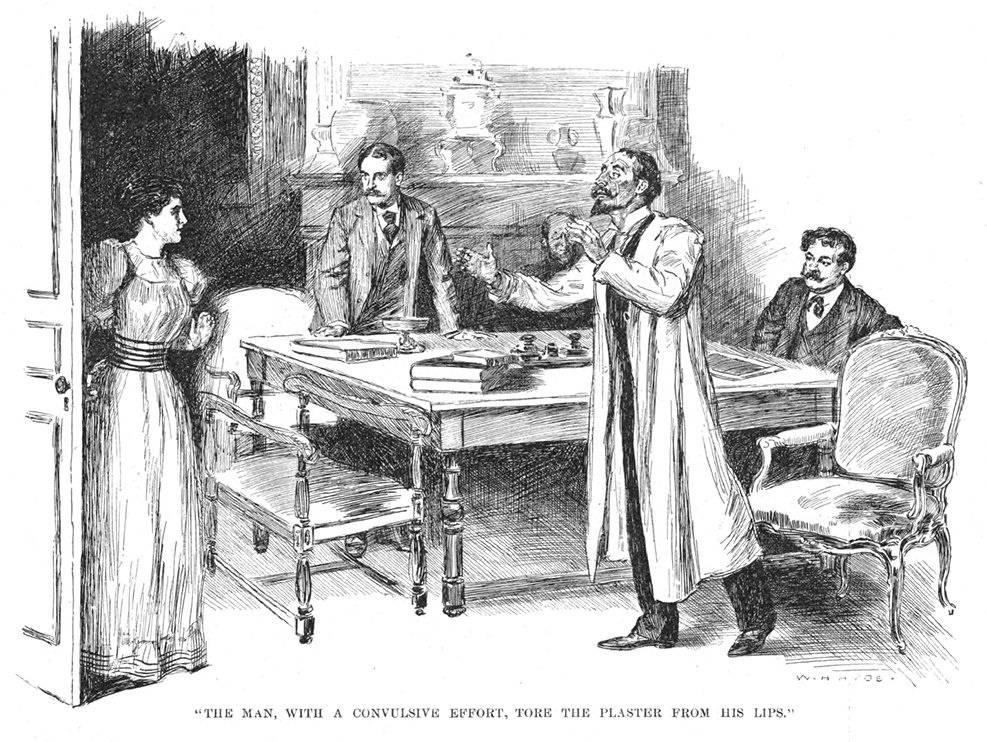
- 1893 illustration by W. H. Hyde in Harper's Weekly

Text available at Wikisource
- Country: United Kingdom
- Language: English
- Genre: Detective fiction short stories

Publication
- Published in: Strand Magazine
- Publication date: September 1893

Chronology
- Series: The Memoirs of Sherlock Holmes
The Adventure of the Resident Patient	The Adventure of the Naval Treaty

"The Adventure of the Greek Interpreter", one of the 56 Sherlock Holmes short stories written by Sir Arthur Conan Doyle, is one of 12 stories in the cycle collected as The Memoirs of Sherlock Holmes. The story was originally published in The Strand Magazine (UK) and Harper's Weekly (US) in September 1893. This story introduces Holmes's elder brother Mycroft. Doyle ranked "The Greek Interpreter" seventeenth in a list of his nineteen favourite Sherlock Holmes stories.

== Plot ==
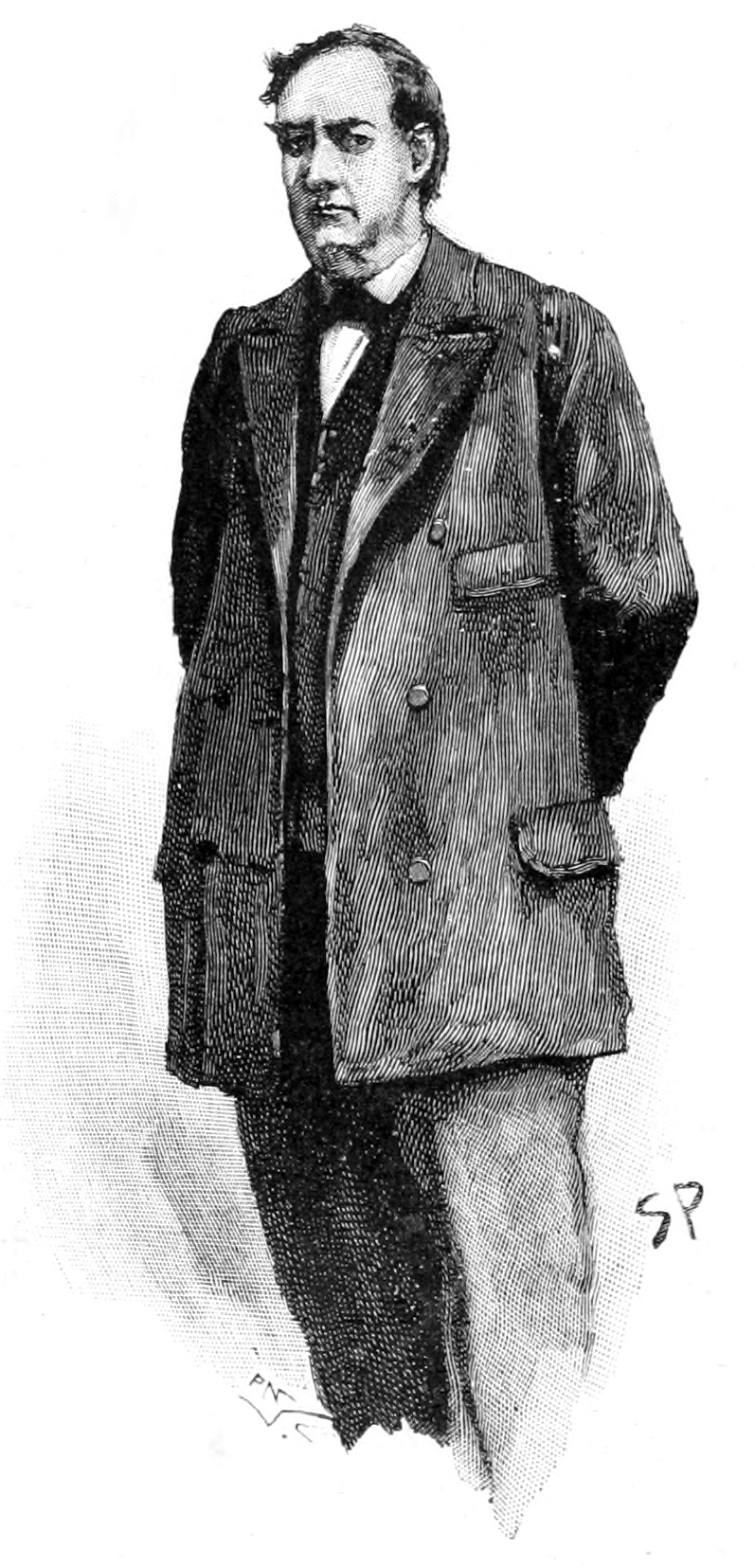
Mycroft Holmes, 1893 illustration by Sidney Paget in the Strand Magazine

One summer evening, while engaged in an aimless conversation that has come round to the topic of hereditary attributes, Doctor Watson learns that Sherlock Holmes, far from being a one-off in his powers of observation and deductive reasoning, in fact has an elder brother whose skills Holmes claims outstrip even his own. As a consequence of this, Watson becomes acquainted with the Diogenes Club and his friend's brother, Mycroft. Mycroft, as Watson learns, does not have the energy of his younger brother and as a consequence is uninterested in using his great skills for detective work:

If the art of the detective began and ended in reasoning from an arm-chair, my brother would be the greatest criminal agent that ever lived. But he has no ambition and no energy. He will not even go out of his way to verify his own solution, and would rather be considered wrong than take the trouble to prove himself right.

In spite of his inertia, the elder Holmes has often delivered the correct answer to a problem that Sherlock has brought to him. On this occasion, however, it is Mycroft who has need to consult Sherlock. Mr. Melas, a Greek interpreter and neighbour of Mycroft, tells of a rather unnerving experience he has recently gone through.

Melas was called upon one evening by a man named Harold Latimer to go to a house, supposedly in Kensington, to translate on a business matter. On the way there in Latimer's coach, Melas noticed that the windows were papered over so that he could not see where he was. Latimer also produced a bludgeon, laying it beside him as an implied threat. Melas protested, saying that what Latimer was doing was unlawful. The kidnapper replied that he would make it up to Melas, but threatened him with unspecified retribution should the evening's business ever be made public.

For approximately two hours they drove, at last arriving at a house. It was dark, and Melas got only a general impression of a large property as he was hustled out of the coach and into the house. The house itself was poorly lit, but Melas made out that it was quite big. In the room into which he was led by Latimer and another, nervous, giggling gentleman—whose name is later discovered to be Wilson Kemp—Melas noticed a deep-pile carpet, a high marble mantel, and a suit of Japanese armour.

Another man was brought into the room. He was thin and emaciated and had sticking plaster all over his face, and a bandage sealing his mouth. Melas was sly enough to observe that his kidnappers were utterly ignorant of Greek, and used this to find out some information. While Latimer and his companion had Melas translate demands that the man sign some papers, Melas added his own short questions to the dialogue. The man not only answered Latimer that he would never sign these papers, but he also answered Melas that his name was Kratides, that he had been in London for three weeks, that he had no idea what house he was in, and that his captors at the house were starving him. He wrote all his answers, unable as he was to speak through the sticking plaster.

Much could be inferred from Kratides's answers to Latimer, too. Evidently, Latimer was trying to coerce Kratides into signing over property to him, and a woman was also involved. Latimer had warned Kratides that his obstinacy would do her no good. Melas would have extracted the whole story from the stranger had the woman herself not burst in unexpectedly, but even that event furnished new information. She recognised Kratides as "Paul", whereupon he managed to get the bandage off his mouth and he called her "Sophy". They both behaved as though neither had expected to see the other.

Melas was ushered back into the coach for another interminable ride and was deposited far from his home on Wandsworth Common. He made it to Clapham Junction just in time for the last train to Victoria. He had presented his story at the Diogenes Club to Mycroft, who asks his brother Sherlock to look into it.

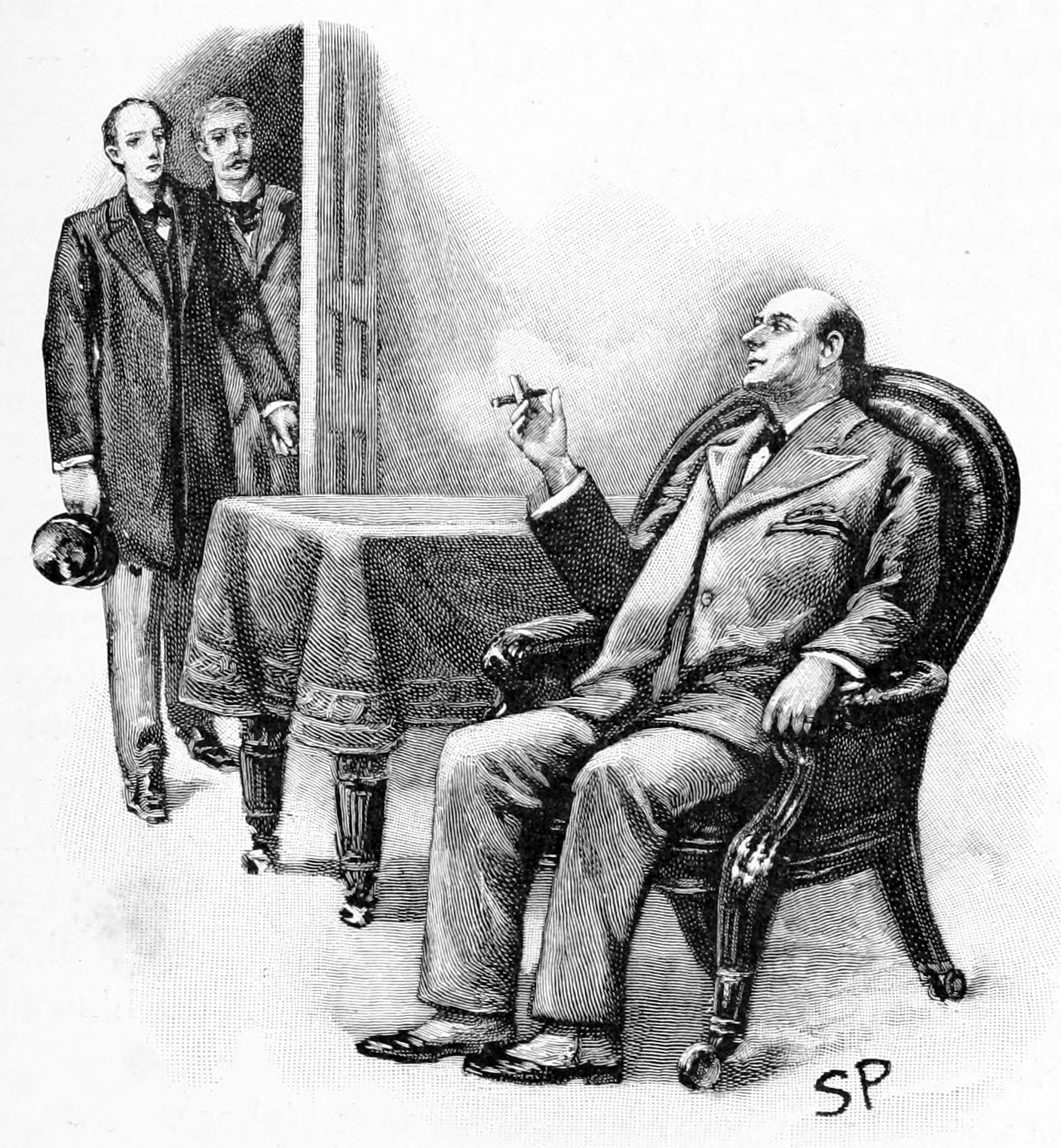
Sherlock Holmes, Dr. Watson and Mycroft Holmes in 221B Baker Street, 1893 illustration by Sidney Paget

An advertisement has been placed begging the public for information. It yields a result. A Mr. Davenport knows the woman in question, and she is currently residing at The Myrtles, a house in Beckenham. Sherlock Holmes and his brother Mycroft, who received the message from Davenport, decide that they must go to Beckenham to see about this. Watson comes, too, and they decide to pick up Inspector Gregson, and Melas as well in case some translating needs to be done. They find, however, that he has already been picked up, by a nervous, giggling man brandishing a bludgeon. Holmes knows that this means the thugs know that Melas has betrayed them.

After the necessary legal procedures for securing a search warrant have been completed, the group proceeds to Beckenham only to discover that the house has been abandoned. Tracks indicate that a fully loaded coach has recently pulled out of the drive. Breaking in, they discover Melas and Kratides bound in a closed room where some charcoal has been lit to gas the two of them: Melas recovers thanks to Watson's timely intervention, but Kratides is already dead.

Apparently, Kratides never signed any papers. It turns out that Sophy's friends contacted Kratides, who was Sophy's brother, in Greece to tell of what they thought was a bad situation for her with Latimer. He then came to England and wound up in Latimer's power. Latimer tried to force Kratides to sign over his sister's property, but he refused absolutely.

All that is ever again heard of the thugs Latimer and Kemp is a news story from Hungary describing the deaths of "two Englishmen who had been travelling with a woman". The official report attributes their deaths to a fight between the two of them; however, Watson notes in closing that Holmes believes Sophy to have avenged the abuse of Kratides and herself by stabbing both Latimer and Kemp.

== Publication history ==
"The Adventure of the Greek Interpreter" was first published in the UK in The Strand Magazine in September 1893, and in the US in Harper's Weekly (under the title "The Greek Interpreter") on 16 September 1893. It was also published in the US edition of The Strand Magazine in October 1893. The story was published with eight illustrations by Sidney Paget in the Strand, and with two illustrations by W. H. Hyde in Harper's Weekly. It was included in The Memoirs of Sherlock Holmes, which was published in December 1893 in the UK and February 1894 in the US.

== Adaptations ==
=== Film and television ===
The story was adapted as a 1922 silent short film as part of the Stoll film series. It starred Eille Norwood as Holmes and Hubert Willis as Watson, and featured J. R. Tozer as Harold Latimer and Robert Vallis as Wilson Kemp.

The story was adapted for Sherlock Holmes (1954 TV series), starring Ronald Howard as Holmes and Howard Marion Crawford as Watson. However, a number of changes were made. For one, Mycroft Holmes does not appear in this episode. For another, the episode is renamed "The Adventure of the French Interpreter", and thus Melas and Kratides are made Frenchmen instead of Greek. The French version of Kratides is also eventually made to sign the papers, rather than refusing, and he survives the story, pushing Kemp down a staircase and killing him, while Latimer is taken under arrest. The fate of Latimer's former fiancée is left up to the viewer's imagination.

The story was adapted for the 1968 BBC series with Peter Cushing. The episode is now lost.

The third episode of The Adventures of Sherlock Holmes and Dr. Watson is based upon "The Adventure of Charles Augustus Milverton", but the beginning has a meeting between the heroes and Mycroft, with the scene being adapted from the story. The billiard-maker they analyze through the window turns out, unknown to them, to be Milverton's informer and Moriarty's henchman.

The story was adapted for television in 1985 as part of The Adventures of Sherlock Holmes series, starring Jeremy Brett as Holmes, David Burke as Dr. Watson and Charles Gray as Mycroft Holmes. The episode is largely faithful to the original short story, but certain changes are made; in particular, Kratides is eventually compelled to sign the paper and the ending is amended to have Holmes, Watson and Mycroft confront the villains on board a train as they attempt to escape to Greece, during which Latimer is killed as he attempts to escape and both Kemp and Sophia are taken into custody.

"Art in the blood, Watson. It is liable to take the strangest forms." Sherlock Holmes clarifies to Dr. Joan Watson in the first episode of the second season of the CBS TV series Elementary, which refers to the assertion in the story, that "Art in the blood is liable to take the strangest forms." "Art in the blood", twenty third episode of the second season of Elementary, which is named after an allusion from this story, updates many elements of the original story to the contemporary era. In the 24th episode, Sherlock describes Mycroft as a man who "has no ambition and no energy" and "would rather be considered wrong than take the trouble to prove himself right", which is directly quoted from the story.

In the 2012 Sherlock episode "A Scandal in Belgravia", Watson is seen writing a story in his blog titled "The Geek Interpreter". In the 2014 episode "The Empty Hearse", Sherlock and his brother Mycroft have a casual competition over analyzing a certain knitted hat, a reference to the discussion in this short story on analyzing a man they see on the street through the window of the Diogenes Club. In the 2015 special, The Abominable Bride, a Mr. Melas is also referenced as waiting to see Mycroft after he has discussed a case with his brother and Dr. Watson.

In the seventh episode of the NHK puppetry television series Sherlock Holmes, Sherman, a female pupil of Beeton School who can communicate with animals is kidnapped. She is made to interpret dog's language to find a bone of Neanderthal stolen from a laboratory and taken away by a dog but no clue is found. Holmes decides to solve the case with the help of his elder brother Mycroft and visits him in the Diogenes Club in Dealer house where he lives. Though Holmes is estranged from Mycroft, the brothers and Watson discover the bone and find out that it was Wilson Kemp, a pupil who lives in Dealer house, who stole it but Mycroft tries to hush up the truth.

=== Audio ===
A radio adaptation of "The Greek Interpreter", dramatised by Edith Meiser, aired on 26 January 1931 in the American radio series The Adventures of Sherlock Holmes, starring Richard Gordon as Sherlock Holmes and Leigh Lovell as Dr. Watson.

Edith Meiser also adapted the story as an episode of the American radio series The New Adventures of Sherlock Holmes, with Basil Rathbone as Holmes and Nigel Bruce as Watson, that aired on 15 January 1940. Another episode in the same series that was adapted from the story aired in July 1943.

Michael Hardwick adapted the story as a radio adaptation which aired on the BBC Light Programme in April 1960, as part of the 1952–1969 radio series starring Carleton Hobbs as Holmes and Norman Shelley as Watson, with Jeffrey Segal as Melas and Michael Turner as Inspector Gregson.

"The Greek Interpreter" was dramatised for BBC Radio 4 in 1992 by Gerry Jones as part of the 1989–1998 radio series starring Clive Merrison as Holmes and Michael Williams as Watson. It featured Peter Polycarpou as Melas and Gordon Reid as the Laughing Man.

The story was adapted as a 2010 episode of The Classic Adventures of Sherlock Holmes, a series on the American radio show Imagination Theatre, starring John Patrick Lowrie as Holmes and Lawrence Albert as Watson.

In 2026, the podcast Sherlock & Co. adapted the story in a five-episode adventure called "The Greek Interpreter", starring Harry Attwell as Sherlock Holmes, Paul Waggott as Dr. John Watson and Marta da Silva as Mariana "Mrs. Hudson" Ametxazurra. Donalds Pirie plays Giorgios Melas and series creator Joel Emery plays Harold Latimer. Mycroft Holmes has his first appearance as is voiced by Thomas Mitchell.
