= The Adventure of the Gloria Scott =

Short story by Arthur Conan Doyle featuring Sherlock Holmes

- Short story by Arthur Conan Doyle
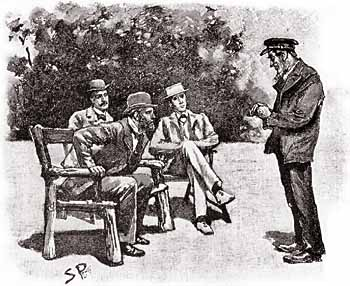
- From left to right, Justice Trevor, Victor Trevor, Holmes, and Hudson, 1893 illustration by Sidney Paget in The Strand Magazine.
- Country: United Kingdom
- Language: English
- Genre: Detective fiction short stories

Publication
- Published in: Strand Magazine
- Publication date: April 1893

Chronology
- Series: The Memoirs of Sherlock Holmes
The Adventure of the Stockbroker's Clerk	The Adventure of the Musgrave Ritual

"The Adventure of the Gloria Scott", one of the 56 Sherlock Holmes short stories written by Sir Arthur Conan Doyle, is one of 12 stories in the cycle collected as The Memoirs of Sherlock Holmes. It was first published in The Strand Magazine in the United Kingdom in April 1893, and in Harper's Weekly in the United States on 15 April 1893.

It is chronologically the earliest case in the Sherlock Holmes canon. This story is related mainly by Holmes rather than Watson, and is the first case to which Holmes applied his powers of deduction, having treated it as a mere hobby until this time. This is one of numerous Sherlock Holmes stories in which a protagonist is haunted by an old acquaintance for an old crime. The others include "The Boscombe Valley Mystery", "Black Peter", "The Sign of Four", "The Five Orange Pips", and "The Resident Patient". It is also one of his many stories that deal with the fate of characters who return to England after having spent time abroad in the colonies of the British Empire.

== Plot ==
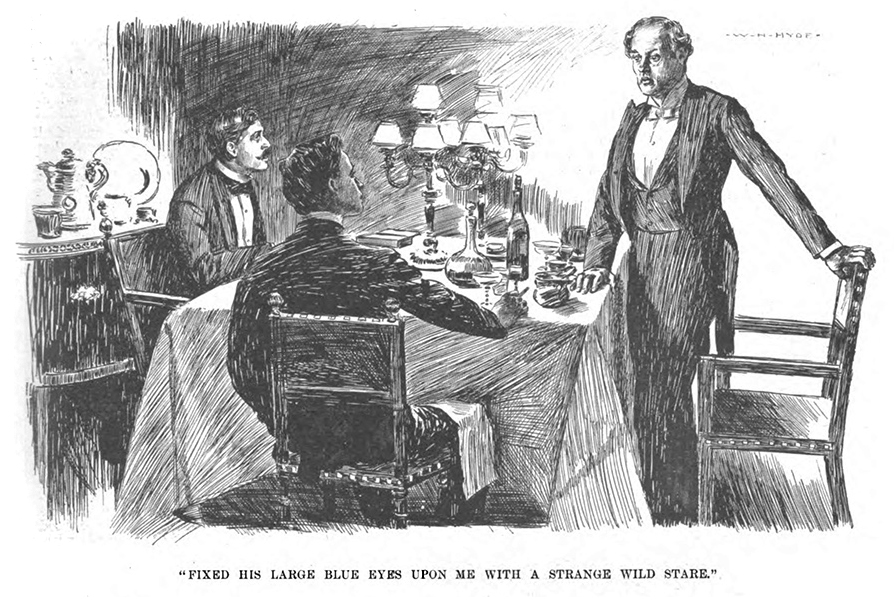
Victor Trevor, Sherlock Holmes, and the elder Mr Trevor, 1893 illustration by WH Hyde in Harper's Weekly.

In his university days, Holmes spent a month with his friend, Victor Trevor, at Victor's father's estate in Norfolk. While there, Holmes amazed his host, Victor's father, who was a Justice of the Peace and a landowner. He had made his fortune in the goldfields in Australia. One of Holmes's deductions, that Mr Trevor was once connected to someone with the initials "J.A." whom he wanted to forget, caused him to pass out on the spot. Holmes had touched a sore spot, and possibly did not believe the old man's explanation once he had come back to himself that J.A. had been an old lover.

Holmes perceived that he was making his host uncomfortable and decided to take his leave. The evening before he did so, another old man named Hudson suddenly appeared at the house, causing Mr Trevor to rush inside for a drink of brandy before greeting him. They had apparently been shipmates some 30 years earlier, and Mr Trevor said something about finding him some work. Soon afterwards, Holmes and Victor found Mr Trevor drunk.

Holmes then left the Trevor estate and spent the next seven weeks on a set of chemistry experiments, only to receive a sudden telegram from Victor begging him to return to Norfolk. Once Holmes arrived, Victor told him that Mr Trevor was dying as a result of a stroke suffered after he received a letter, postmarked Fordingbridge in Hampshire. They found that he had died while Victor had been meeting Holmes at the station.

After Holmes' earlier departure, Hudson proved to be as unruly an employee as could be imagined. He had demanded to be promoted from gardener to butler and had got what he wanted. He was often drunk, and took extensive liberties with the property and servants which would normally have resulted in an employee's dismissal. Despite Victor's disapproval and the other servants' complaints, Mr Trevor continued to let Hudson do as he pleased. Suddenly, Hudson announced that he was leaving because he had tired of Norfolk, and he was going to Hampshire to see Beddoes, another old shipmate.

Hudson's presence had caused great stress to Victor, who thought the trouble would end once Hudson left. The arrival of the letter proved him wrong, however. It read:

"The supply of game for London is going steadily up. Head-keeper Hudson, we believe, has been now told to receive all orders for fly-paper and for preservation of your hen pheasant's life."

The letter meant nothing to Victor, but Holmes eventually realised that it contained a hidden message based on reading the first word and every third one thereafter: "The game is up. Hudson has told all. Fly for your life." Holmes concluded that the "game" was a blackmail scheme perpetrated by Hudson against both Beddoes and Mr Trevor. The latter's dying words to his doctor led Victor to some papers hidden in a cabinet, which contained a full account of Mr Trevor's past.

Born James Armitage, he had been convicted of embezzling money from the bank where he worked. He was sentenced to transportation and put aboard a ship, the Gloria Scott, bound for Australia from Falmouth. One of Armitage's fellow prisoners, Jack Prendergast, told him of a conspiracy to take over the ship. Prendergast had bribed most of the ship's crew and officers, and had arranged for a confederate posing as a chaplain to smuggle weapons and equipment to the prisoners.

The takeover began ahead of schedule when the doctor discovered a prisoner's weapons while treating him. The others stormed the deck, killing the captain and many other men while suffering heavy losses, but a dispute soon arose over what to do with the survivors who had not been privy to the plot. Those who wanted to spare the men's lives, including Armitage and a prisoner named Evans, were given a boat and supplies and allowed to leave. Shortly afterward, the Gloria Scott was destroyed when a barrel of gunpowder exploded in the violence that continued aboard after their departure, and they found Hudson alive amid the wreckage and took him onto the boat.

Picked up by another Australia-bound ship the following day, the men on the boat passed themselves off as shipwreck survivors. Armitage and Evans respectively assumed new identities as Trevor and Beddoes upon reaching Sydney and began to work in the goldfields. Both of them later returned to England as wealthy men and lived comfortably until Hudson tracked them down and threatened to expose their criminal pasts.

Heartbroken by his father's death, Victor traveled to the Terai and began to work at its tea plantations. Since no scandal involving the Gloria Scott was ever reported after Beddoes' letter arrived, and since neither Hudson nor Beddoes was ever heard from again, the police believed Hudson had murdered Beddoes and fled. Holmes concluded the opposite: that Beddoes had killed Hudson, mistakenly assuming that he had told the secret, and then left England with whatever money he had at hand.

The case is referenced by Holmes once more in "The Adventure of the Sussex Vampire" when Holmes consults an index of his past exploits for references to "vampires" and remarks on "the Voyage of the Gloria Scott" listed under "V". It is also mentioned in passing in "The Adventure of the Musgrave Ritual" as Holmes recounts to Watson his early cases when he first became a detective.

== Discrepancy ==
The confession account contained a scribbled footnote from the elder Trevor that recorded the fatal note delivered to him. This contradicts the stated fact that Trevor never regained consciousness until the very end of his life, at which time he merely revealed where the confession lay.

According to Trevor's confession the Gloria Scott left Falmouth "thirty years ago" and precisely in 1855, but that would set Holmes's enquiry in 1885 and not in his college years, as he told Watson. Since further in the story the elder Trevor writes also: "For more than twenty years we have led peaceful and useful lives", we can assume that the exact date is around 1875, which would fit Holmes's reference to his college years. It is also possible that the "thirty years" was a rounding of twenty-five years, which would place the case in 1880.

== Publication history ==
The story was published in the UK in The Strand Magazine in April 1893, and in the US in Harper's Weekly on 15 April 1893. It was also published in the US edition of the Strand in May 1893. The story was published with seven illustrations by Sidney Paget in The Strand Magazine, and with two illustrations by W. H. Hyde in Harper's Weekly. It was included in the short story collection The Memoirs of Sherlock Holmes, which was published in the UK in December 1893 and in the US in February 1894.

== Adaptations ==
=== Film and television ===
The story was adapted as a 1923 short film for the Sherlock Holmes Stoll film series, with Eille Norwood as Sherlock Holmes and Hubert Willis as Dr Watson.

The 1954–1955 Sherlock Holmes television series starring Ronald Howard as Holmes and H. Marion Crawford as Watson loosely adapted the story for its episode "The Case of the Blind Man's Bluff", changing the name of the ship to the "Gloria North". It retains elements from the story, such as a respectable character with a tattoo he has tried to erase but which Holmes observes anyway (in the episode, the tattoo was the initials "G.N." for "Gloria North" rather than "J.A."). The episode was later remade, retaining the plot structure and much of the dialogue, for the 1980 American-Polish series Sherlock Holmes and Doctor Watson starring Geoffrey Whitehead, which was also produced by Sheldon Reynolds.

"The Gloria Scott" was a 2001 episode of the animated series Sherlock Holmes in the 22nd Century, in which the titular prison ship was a spacecraft en route to the Moon.

In the 2014 episode "The Empty Hearse", the first episode of the third series of the BBC television series Sherlock, Dr Watson's fiancee, Mary Morstan, solves a coded text message on a cellphone by reading every third word. In the fourth series episode "The Final Problem" in 2017, it is revealed that Holmes had a childhood friend named Victor Trevor.

=== Radio and audio dramas ===
Edith Meiser adapted the story as an episode of the American radio series The Adventures of Sherlock Holmes with Richard Gordon as Sherlock Holmes and Leigh Lovell as Dr Watson. The episode aired on 21 January 1932. Other episodes adapted from the story aired on 14 April 1935 (with Louis Hector as Holmes and Lovell as Watson) and 1 October 1936 (with Gordon as Holmes and Harry West as Watson).

Meiser also adapted the story for the American radio series The New Adventures of Sherlock Holmes as an episode with Basil Rathbone as Holmes and Nigel Bruce as Watson, which aired on 28 December 1941.

The story was adapted as an episode of the American radio series CBS Radio Mystery Theater titled "The Gloria Scott". The episode, which starred Kevin McCarthy as Sherlock Holmes and Court Benson as Dr Watson, first aired in November 1977.

"The Gloria Scott" was dramatised by Vincent McInerney for BBC Radio 4 in 1992, as part of the 1989–1998 radio series starring Clive Merrison as Holmes and Michael Williams as Watson. It featured Simon Treves as Victor and Terence Edmond as Trevor.

A 2008 episode of The Classic Adventures of Sherlock Holmes, a series on the American radio show Imagination Theatre, was adapted from the story, with John Patrick Lowrie as Holmes and Lawrence Albert as Watson.

In 2024, the podcast Sherlock & Co. adapted the story in a two-episodes adventure called "The Gloria Scott", starring Harry Attwell as Holmes and Paul Waggott as Watson.

=== Print ===
In 2005, Croatian writer Mima Simić published a short story collection entitled Pustolovine Glorije Scott (Adventures of Gloria Scott). This loose adaptation introduces a queer parody of the Sherlock Holmes canon through the gender reversal of the protagonists: disastrous detective Gloria Scott and her faithful assistant Mary Lambert. A TV animation series based on this adaptation was under development as of 2014.

The 2016 book The Murder of Mary Russell by Laurie R. King is based on the premise that Gloria Scott's Hudson is none other than the father of Holmes' landlady Mrs Hudson.
