= The Adventure of the Musgrave Ritual =

Short story by Arthur Conan Doyle featuring Sherlock Holmes

- Short story by Arthur Conan Doyle
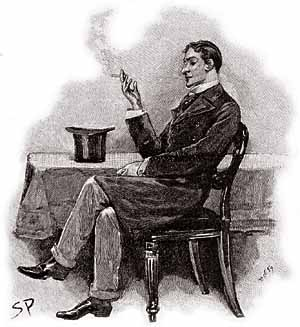
- Reginald Musgrave, 1893 illustration by Sidney Paget in The Strand Magazine.
- Country: United Kingdom
- Language: English
- Genre: Detective fiction short stories

Publication
- Published in: The Strand Magazine
- Publication date: May 1893

Chronology
- Series: The Memoirs of Sherlock Holmes
"The Adventure of the Gloria Scott"	"The Adventure of the Reigate Squire"

"The Adventure of the Musgrave Ritual" is a short story by Arthur Conan Doyle, featuring his fictional detective Sherlock Holmes. The story was originally published in The Strand Magazine in the United Kingdom in May 1893, and in Harper's Weekly in the United States on 13 May 1893. It was collected in The Memoirs of Sherlock Holmes.

Unlike the majority of Holmes stories, the main narrator is not Doctor Watson, but Sherlock Holmes himself. With Watson providing an introduction, the story within a story is a classic example of a frame tale. It is one of the earliest recorded cases investigated by Holmes, and establishes his problem solving skills.

"The Adventure of the Musgrave Ritual" shares elements with two Edgar Allan Poe tales: "The Gold-Bug" and "The Cask of Amontillado".

== Plot ==
In a frame story, Holmes goes through some of his old records, and recounts one of his earliest cases to Watson.

Former university acquaintance, Reginald Musgrave, calls on Holmes regarding strange events at Hurlstone, his ancient family manor house. Musgraves have dwelt at Hurlstone since before the English Civil War; since that time period, each eldest son of the house memorizes and recites a strange poem upon coming of age:

'Whose was it?'
'His who is gone.'
'Who shall have it?'
'He who will come.'
('What was the month?'
'The sixth from the first.')
'Where was the sun?'
'Over the oak.'
'Where was the shadow?'
'Under the elm.'
'How was it stepped?'
'North by ten and by ten, east by five and by five, south by two and by two, west by one and by one, and so under.'
'What shall we give for it?'
'All that is ours.'
'Why should we give it?'
'For the sake of the trust.'

Late one night, Musgrave unable to sleep, hears a noise. Investigating, he catches his longtime butler, Brunton, secretly studying the ritual and other private papers. Angered by this inappropriate behavior, Musgrave orders Brunton to immediately leave the premises. Brunton begs for time to appear that he left of his own accord to avoid public disgrace. Musgrave grants him a week, but a few days later, Brunton disappears, leaving behind all his belongings. His bed has not been slept in, and no one saw him leave. A maid, Rachel Howells—whom Brunton had spurned for another woman—becomes hysterical when questioned and is confined to a sickbed, still raving. A hired nurse watches over her, but Rachel escapes during the night. Following Rachel's trail, Musgrave and the police discover a satchel she threw into the manor lake that contains nothing but twisted metal and a few mud-covered coloured stones.

Like Brunton, Holmes realises that the seemingly meaningless ritual was likely instructions to a valuable object's hiding place. Ascertaining the height of the biggest oak tree on the property, and the location of a former giant elm tree, Holmes repeats Brunton's actions, which lead into an abandoned wing of the house. The cellar under this wing is used for storing lumber; Holmes finds the wood pushed to one side, revealing a metal ring in one of the floor stones with Brunton's muffler tied to it. With help from Musgrave and a policeman, Holmes raises the heavy stone to reveal a deep hole in the floor. Below is Brunton's asphyxiated body lying across an ancient wooden chest. A few coins from the Charles I era are scattered inside the hole.

After the body is removed, Holmes notices several wood billets that were likely used as levers or props to raise the stone. Holmes deduces that Brunton—unable to lift the heavy stone alone—recruited Rachel to help lift the stone, using the wood pieces. After Brunton climbed in and handed the satchel up to Rachel, the slab fell shut, either accident or intentionally, with Rachel fleeing out of guilt.

Holmes cleans and examines the satchel's contents, revealing that the metal pieces are gold and the stones gems. The fragments are the remains of St Edward's Crown, which belonged to Charles I ("He who is gone"). Reginald confirms that his ancestor, Sir Ralph Musgrave, was a high-ranking Cavalier close to Charles I's son and heir, Charles II ("He who will come"). Sir Ralph was likely given the crown for safekeeping, and hid it beneath the stone and created the ritual as a clue to its location. The ritual's meaning was never passed down before Sir Ralph died; for the next 200 years, the poem was considered a quaint family custom.

After much legal and governmental interactions, the Musgraves are allowed to keep the fragments on display. Rachel is never found, and Musgrave fears she has committed suicide, though Holmes believes it more likely that she fled the country.

== Publication history ==
The story was originally published in the Strand Magazine in May 1893, with illustrations by Sidney Paget. It was later collected in The Memoirs of Sherlock Holmes. The Strand's text of the ritual did not specify the month in which the shadow of the elm should be measured (the shadow would be longer in winter and point in different directions throughout the year), but a couplet was added for the Memoirs identifying the month as the "sixth from the first".

"The Adventure of the Musgrave Ritual" was also published in the US in Harper's Weekly on 13 May 1893, and in the US edition of The Strand Magazine in June 1893. The story was published with six illustrations by Sidney Paget in the Strand, and with two illustrations by W. H. Hyde in Harper's Weekly. It was included in The Memoirs of Sherlock Holmes, which was published in December 1893 in the UK and February 1894 in the US.

== Adaptations ==
=== Film and television ===
The 1912 silent film Le Trésor des Musgraves (intertitles in French)

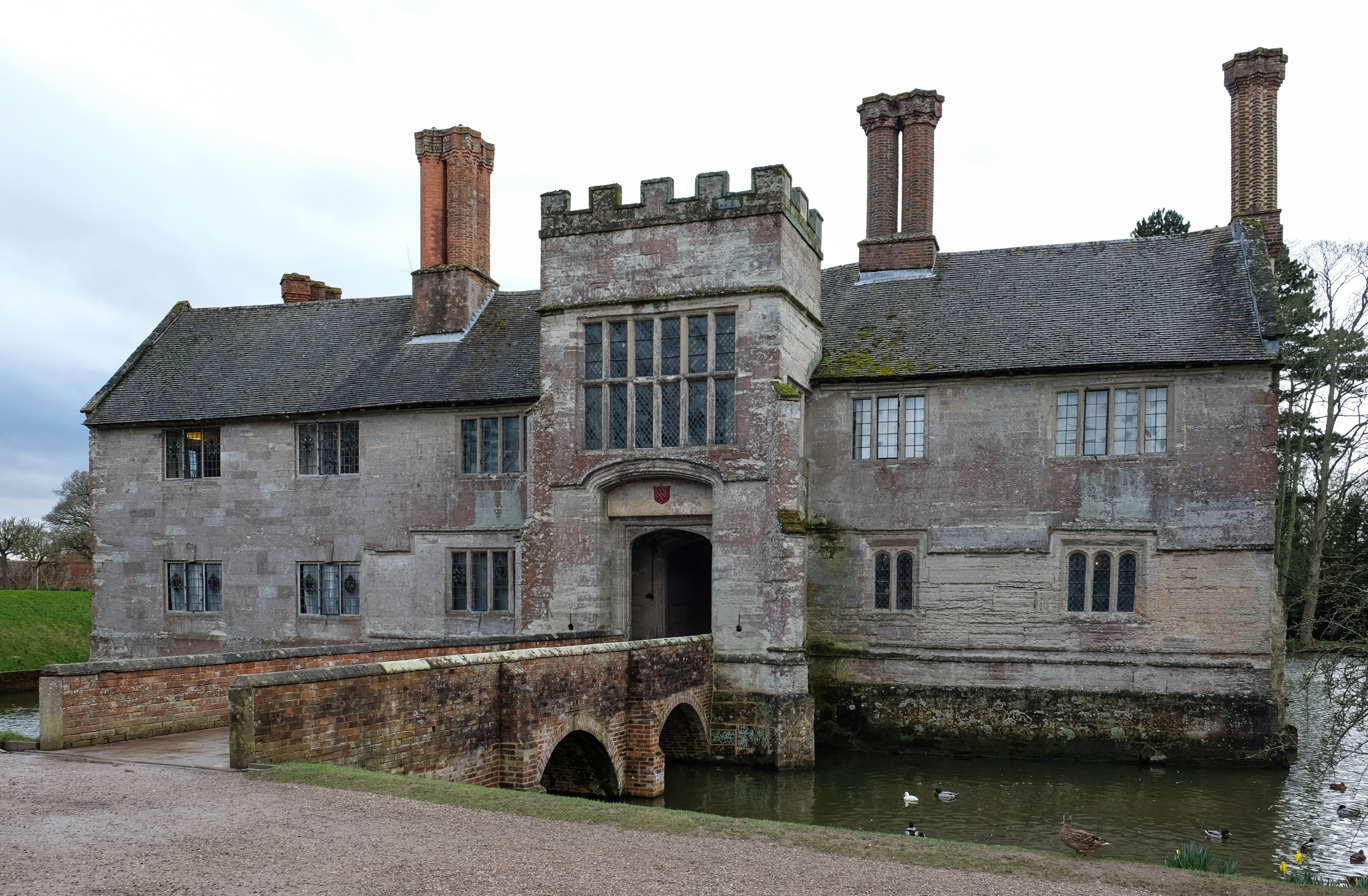
Baddesley Clinton

The story was adapted for the 1912 French-British Éclair film series as a silent short film.

It was also adapted as a short film as part of the Stoll film series. The film was released in 1922.

The 1943 film Sherlock Holmes Faces Death, part of the Basil Rathbone/Nigel Bruce series of films, loosely adapted the story, though the ritual was completely re-written to represent a chess game played on the floor of the Musgrave mansion. Also the treasure is a land grant that was given to the Musgraves by Henry VIII instead of the lost crown of Charles I.

The story was adapted for the 1954 television series, Sherlock Holmes, there titled "The Case of the Greystone Inscription".

The story was adapted for the 1965 BBC series Sherlock Holmes with Peter Cushing. The episode is now lost.

The story was adapted for an episode of Sherlock Holmes, the Granada Television series starring Jeremy Brett. The episode deviated from the original by including Watson in the adventure; the story nods to the framing device of the original by having Holmes, not looking forward to the trip, remark that he intends to organise some of his old cases before he met Watson in order to keep himself occupied. In addition, the story features an actual oak tree, which Holmes describes as "a patriarch among oaks, one of the most magnificent trees that I have ever seen." In the Granada film version, however, Holmes utilizes a weathervane in the shape of an oak perched on top of the Musgrave mansion to solve the mysterious ritual. At the very end of the teleplay, Rachel's body is shown to have been found after having floated up from the mere. Further, the 12th line of the ritual is adapted to suit the scenery and the 5th and 6th lines are omitted. It was filmed in the 400-year-old Baddesley Clinton Manor House near Birmingham, UK. This house was the Musgrave home in the TV episode. In the original story, this was one of Holmes' early cases just after he had graduated from college; in the adaptation, the time sequence is moved to when Holmes had partnered with Watson to solve mysteries.

An episode of the animated television series Sherlock Holmes in the 22nd Century was based on the story. The episode, titled "The Musgrave Ritual", first aired in 1999.

Episodes 9 and 10 of the 2013 Russian TV series Sherlock Holmes are based on the story, although the storyline is quite different including some action scenes and Brunton being in fact a revenging member of a family of Musgraves' rivals.

The Musgrave Ritual is adapted as part of the storyline of the final episode of the fourth season of Sherlock, "The Final Problem"; as children, the Holmes family lived in an old house called Musgrave, but after Sherlock and Mycroft's sister Eurus was involved in the disappearance of Sherlock's dog/best friend (Sherlock had for years believed it was a dog as he buried the memory due to the scale of the mental trauma), all Eurus would provide as a clue was a strange song. Years later, with John Watson's life at stake as he is trapped in the same location where Eurus left her first victim, Sherlock deduces that the song relates to the unusual dates on various fake gravestones around the house, the resulting 'code' leading him to Eurus' old room to make an emotional appeal to his sister to spare John.

=== Audio ===
Edith Meiser adapted the story as an episode of the American radio series The Adventures of Sherlock Holmes which aired on 5 January 1931, with Richard Gordon as Sherlock Holmes and Leigh Lovell as Dr. Watson.

The story was adapted for the American radio series The New Adventures of Sherlock Holmes with Basil Rathbone as Holmes and Nigel Bruce as Watson. The episode aired on 16 July 1943.

A 1962 BBC Light Programme radio adaptation aired as part of the 1952–1969 radio series starring Carleton Hobbs as Holmes and Norman Shelley as Watson.

An adaptation aired on BBC radio in June 1978, starring Barry Foster as Holmes and David Buck as Watson. It was adapted by Michael Bakewell.

"The Musgrave Ritual" was adapted as a 1981 episode of the series CBS Radio Mystery Theater with Gordon Gould as Sherlock Holmes and Court Benson as Dr. Watson.

"The Musgrave Ritual" was dramatised by Peter Mackie for BBC Radio 4 in 1992 as part of the 1989–1998 radio series starring Clive Merrison as Holmes and Michael Williams as Watson. It featured Robert Daws as Reginald Musgrave and Michael Kilgarriff as Sergeant Harris.

A 2014 episode of The Classic Adventures of Sherlock Holmes, a series on the American radio show Imagination Theatre, was adapted from the story, with John Patrick Lowrie as Holmes and Lawrence Albert as Watson.

In 2026, the podcast Sherlock & Co. adapted the story in a three-episode adventure called "The Musgrave Ritual", starring Harry Attwell as Sherlock Holmes, Paul Waggott as Dr. John Watson and Marta da Silva as Mariana "Mrs. Hudson" Ametxazurra. Joel Emery voices Reginald Musgrave.

=== Stage ===
T. S. Eliot stated that he adapted part of the Ritual in his 1935 verse play Murder in the Cathedral as a deliberate homage.
