= The Adventure of the Crooked Man =

Short story by Arthur Conan Doyle

- Short story by Arthur Conan Doyle
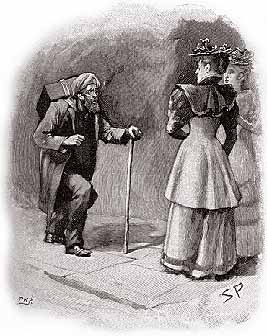
- The "Crooked Man" recognizes Nancy Barclay, 1893 illustration by Sidney Paget in The Strand Magazine

Text available at Wikisource
- Country: United Kingdom
- Language: English
- Genre: Detective fiction short stories

Publication
- Published in: Strand Magazine
- Publication date: July 1893

Chronology
- Series: The Memoirs of Sherlock Holmes
The Adventure of the Reigate Squire	The Adventure of the Resident Patient

"The Adventure of the Crooked Man", one of the 56 Sherlock Holmes short stories written by Sir Arthur Conan Doyle, is one of 12 stories in the cycle collected as The Memoirs of Sherlock Holmes. It was first published in The Strand Magazine in the United Kingdom in July 1893, and in Harper's Weekly in the United States on 8 July 1893.

Doyle ranked "The Adventure of the Crooked Man" 15th in a list of his 19 favourite Sherlock Holmes stories.

== Plot ==
Holmes calls upon Watson at his surgery late one night to request his assistance in an investigation. Holmes explains that, in Aldershot Camp, Colonel James Barclay of The Royal Mallows (in some editions The Royal Munsters) and his wife Nancy DeVoy Barclay were a seemingly happy couple; however, Barclay has died, and his wife is suspected of his murder. Major Murphy, Holmes' contact in the regiment, has explained that Barclay, while completely devoted to his wife, had a rather vindictive nature elsewhere. He had also been subject to random fits of depression, and disliked being left alone at night.

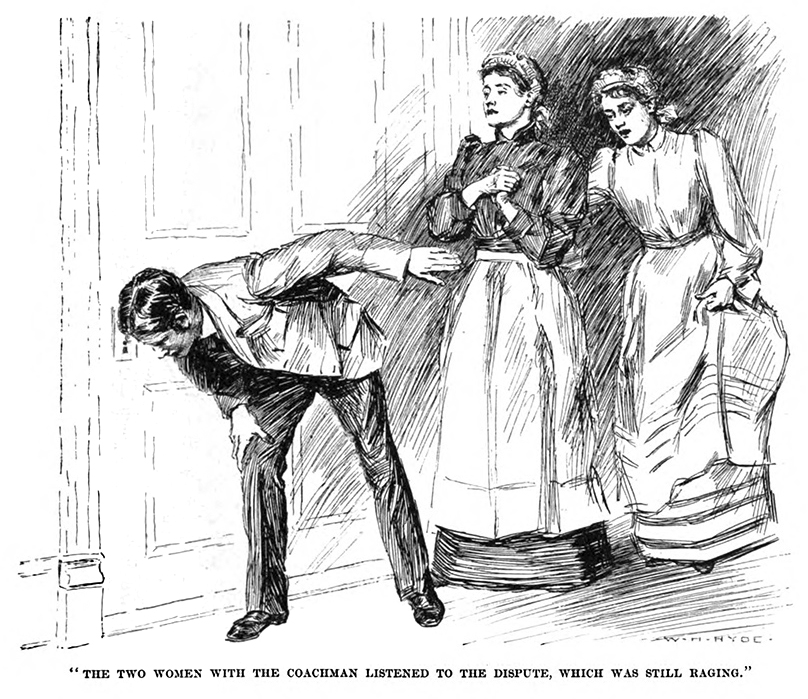
The Barclays are heard arguing, 1893 illustration by W. H. Hyde in Harper's Weekly

The night of the supposed crime, Nancy Barclay left for a church meeting in company with her friend, Miss Morrison. When she returned, she was considerably agitated and asked her maid for tea. When the maid returned with the tea, she overheard the Barclays furiously arguing behind the locked morning room door. Nancy, the only one loud enough to be clearly audible, repeatedly said the words "David", "coward", and "give me back my life". Moments later, screams rang out; when the Barclay's coachman entered the room through the open French windows, he found Nancy collapsed and the colonel dead, bleeding from a head wound. The key to the room was missing, and the door had to be opened by a locksmith. Nancy, temporarily insane from shock, was removed to a hospital, and Holmes was called in to investigate.

Holmes finds signs that a silent third party had been present; the man had left his stick in the room, his footprints in the lawn, and presumably also had taken the key. Holmes also finds the pawmarks of a short-legged, long-bodied animal on the floor, as well as signs the creature had attempted to eat the Barclay's pet canary. Interrogating Miss Morrison, Holmes learns that, on the way home from the meeting, she and Nancy had encountered a deformed man with a wooden box on his back. Both he and Nancy seemed badly startled; he addressed her by name, and she called him "Henry". They spoke privately for a moment, then parted, both very upset. After swearing her friend to silence, Nancy returned home. As the man's appearance was distinctive, Holmes was soon able to discover his identity: Henry Wood, a conjurer who entertained the soldiers around Aldershot.

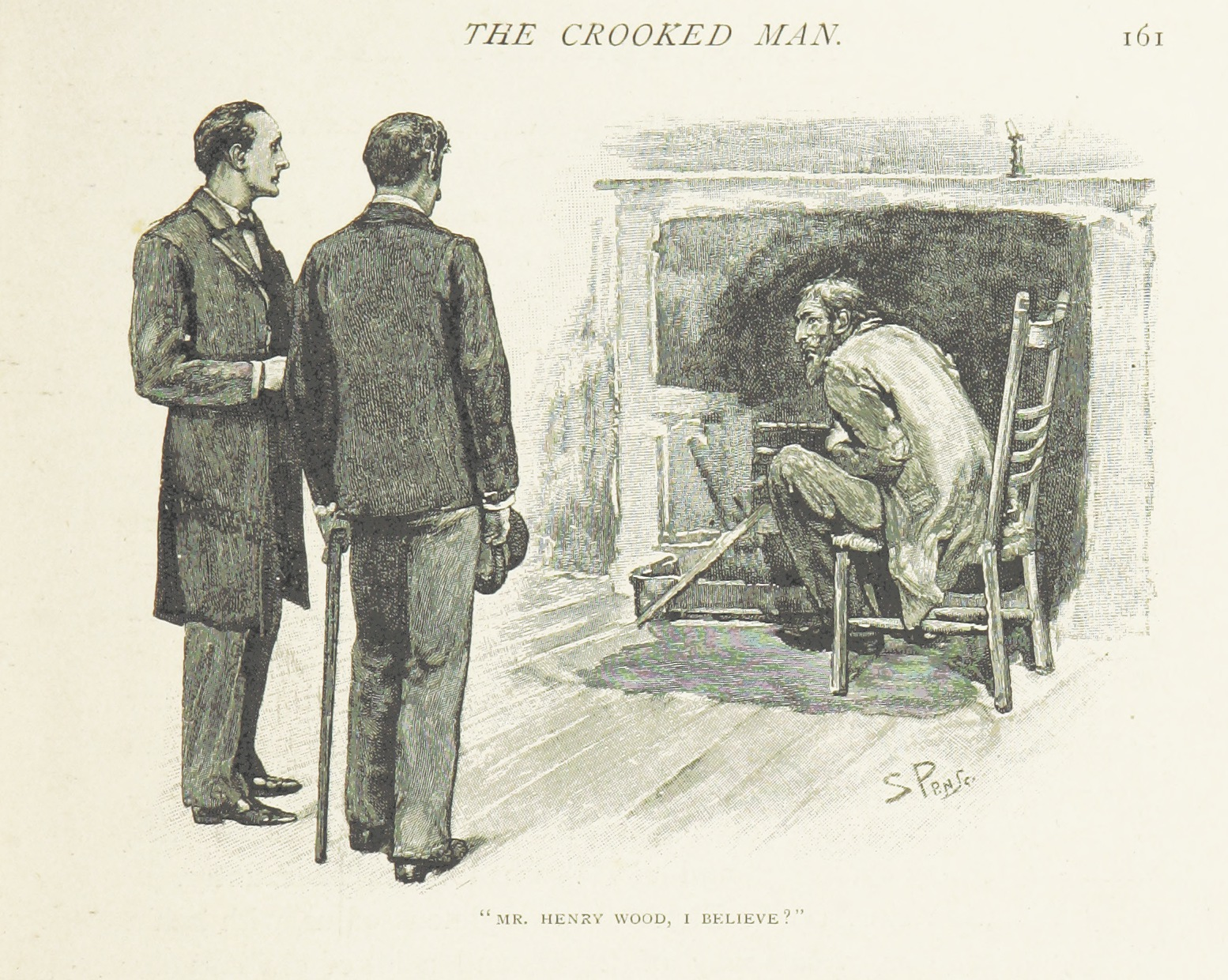
Holmes and Watson meet Henry Wood, illustration by Sidney Paget reprinted in The Memoirs of Sherlock Holmes

With Watson as a witness, Holmes visits Wood in his lodgings. Wood gladly tells his story to save Nancy from being accused of murder. Thirty years prior, he had been in India, a soldier in the Royal Mallows with then-Sergeant Barclay. Both men loved Nancy DeVoy, but she was devoted to Wood, despite her father's disapproval. The couple remained true to each other, nonetheless, but when the Indian Rebellion of 1857 erupted, the Royal Mallows found themselves cut off from supplies. Wood volunteered to go for help, and Barclay gave him information on how to safely sneak through the enemy lines; however, Barclay, wishing to have Nancy to himself, secretly alerted the insurgents that Wood would be passing. Wood was captured, and learned from his captors of the betrayal. Over the years, he was repeatedly enslaved and tortured, resulting in his deformed back and legs. Finally escaping, he lived for many years in India as a conjurer, preferring Nancy and his fellow soldiers to think he had been killed in action instead of seeing his deformity. In his old age, wanting to see England and be around soldiers again, he saved enough money to travel to Aldershot, not realizing his own old regiment was currently stationed there. Unexpectedly running into Nancy, he had admitted her husband's betrayal to her, then secretly followed her to her house. Seeing Barclay arguing with Nancy, Wood had entered the room through the French windows to defend her, but Barclay had instantly died of apoplexy at the mere sight of Wood alive and struck his head on the fender as he fell. Nancy screamed and fainted. In the chaos, Wood's pet mongoose Teddy escaped his wooden box, and ran up the curtain after the canary. Reflexively pocketing the door key, Wood recaptured Teddy and fled the scene, afraid he would be accused of murder.

Like Wood, Holmes is hesitant to rake up a 30-year-old military scandal; learning that the medical examiner has confirmed the colonel died of apoplexy, Holmes keeps Wood's story secret for the time being. Questioned by Watson about Nancy's use of the name "David" when no one involved in the case went by that name, Holmes decides that Nancy must have been comparing her husband to the Biblical King David, who arranged the murder of Uriah to have Uriah's wife Bathsheba.

== Commentary ==
"Elementary, my dear Watson" is an often quoted line from Sherlock Holmes. However, Holmes never says this in any of Sir Arthur Conan Doyle's stories. In The Adventure of the Crooked Man, though, he comes his closest to it:

"I have the advantage of knowing your habits, my dear Watson," said he.
...
"Excellent!" I cried.
"Elementary," said he.

The Granada Television adaptation of "The Crooked Man" reverses the quote, having Watson deduce that Holmes had looked up a passage in the Bible since they returned home from Aldershot. When Holmes asks Watson how he knew, he points out Holmes' bookmark and replies "Elementary, my dear Holmes".

The exact date of this story's setting is unknown, but since Nancy had been married for "upward of thirty years" and the Indian Rebellion broke out in 1857, the date would need to be at or past 1887. The first few lines by Watson explain that this story occurred in the "summer" just after his marriage, which, according to The Sign of the Four, was sometime in 1889; this suggests the story is set in either 1889 or 1890.

The fictional Royal Mallows regiment, which features in "The Crooked Man", also appears in other fiction by Sir Arthur Conan Doyle: the short stories "The Green Flag" and "The Debut of Bimbashi Joyce", both set in the Mahdist War.

== Publication history ==
"The Adventure of the Crooked Man" was published in the UK in The Strand Magazine in July 1893, and in the US in Harper's Weekly on 8 July 1893. It was also published in the US edition of The Strand Magazine in August 1893. The story was published with seven illustrations by Sidney Paget in the Strand, and with two illustrations by W. H. Hyde in Harper's Weekly. It was included in The Memoirs of Sherlock Holmes, which was published in December 1893 in the UK and February 1894 in the US.

== Adaptations ==
=== Film and television ===
The story was adapted as a 1923 silent short film as part of the Stoll film series. It starred Eille Norwood as Holmes and Hubert Willis as Watson, and featured Gladys Jennings as Mrs Barclay and Dora De Winton as Miss Morrison.

The Granada TV version with Jeremy Brett is faithful to the original — except that it has the housekeeper, instead of the coachman, tell Holmes of the clue of the missing key. It also hints that the "Mallows" are a "Lancers" regiment and that Barclay owed most of his rapid rise in ranks from Sergeant to Officer due at least in part to his marriage to the daughter of the regimental sergeant major — rather than merit, as Murphy was already a young sub-officer at the time Barclay was a Sgt; at the time of the story Murphy is still only a major in "temporary" command of the regiment. It starred Norman Jones as Henry Wood, Lisa Daniely as Nancy Barclay, Denys Hawthorne as James Barclay, Fiona Shaw as Miss Morrison, Paul Chapman as Major Murphy, Shelagh Stephenson as Jane, Michael Lumsden as young Henry Wood, Catherine Rabett as young Nancy, and James Wilby as young Barclay.

The story was adapted as a 1999 episode of the animated television series Sherlock Holmes in the 22nd Century titled "The Crooked Man".

Holmes describes this case to his addiction group in the episode "A Giant Gun, Filled with Drugs" (2013) in the CBS TV series Elementary.

=== Audio ===
In December 1930, Edith Meiser adapted the story as an episode of the American radio series The Adventures of Sherlock Holmes, with Richard Gordon as Sherlock Holmes and Leigh Lovell as Dr. Watson.

In November 1940, Edith Meiser also adapted the story as an episode of the later American radio series The New Adventures of Sherlock Holmes, with Basil Rathbone as Holmes and Nigel Bruce as Watson.

In December 1966, Michael Hardwick dramatised the story as a BBC Light Programme radio adaptation, as part of the 1952–1969 radio series starring Carleton Hobbs as Holmes and Norman Shelley as Watson.

In October 1992, "The Crooked Man" was dramatised for BBC Radio 4 by Bert Coules as part of the 1989–1998 radio series starring Clive Merrison as Holmes and Michael Williams as Watson. It featured Brian Blessed as Henry Wood and Terence Edmond as Major Murphy. This adaptation contains a twist to the end of the denouement scene: after Holmes has left the room, Watson advises Wood to wait a while and then return to Nancy Barclay, that his disfigurement will not matter to her. Wood answers ambiguously, and the matter is left (as far as the audience is concerned) unresolved.

In December 2015 The story was adapted as an episode of The Classic Adventures of Sherlock Holmes, a series on the American radio show Imagination Theatre, starring John Patrick Lowrie as Holmes and Lawrence Albert as Watson.

In September 2026, the podcast Sherlock & Co. adapted the story in a two-episode adventure called "The Crooked Man", starring Harry Attwell as Sherlock Holmes, Paul Waggott as Dr. John Watson and Marta da Silva as Mariana "Mrs. Hudson" Ametxazurra.
