= The Adventure of the Reigate Squire =

Short story by Arthur Conan Doyle featuring Sherlock Holmes

- Short story by Arthur Conan Doyle
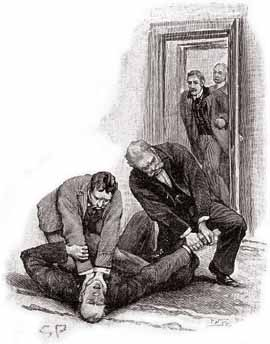
- The Cunninghams fighting with Holmes, 1893 illustration by Sidney Paget in The Strand Magazine

Text available at Wikisource
- Country: United Kingdom
- Language: English
- Genre: Detective fiction short stories

Publication
- Published in: Strand Magazine
- Publication date: June 1893

Chronology
- Series: The Memoirs of Sherlock Holmes
The Adventure of the Musgrave Ritual	The Adventure of the Crooked Man

"The Adventure of the Reigate Squire", also known as "The Adventure of the Reigate Squires" and "The Adventure of the Reigate Puzzle", is one of the 56 Sherlock Holmes short stories written by Sir Arthur Conan Doyle. The story was first published in The Strand Magazine in the United Kingdom and Harper's Weekly in the United States in June 1893. It is one of 12 stories in the cycle collected as The Memoirs of Sherlock Holmes.

== Plot ==
Watson takes Holmes to a friend's estate near Reigate in Surrey to rest after a rather strenuous case in France. Their host is Colonel Hayter, who tells them of a recent burglary at the nearby Acton estate in which the thieves stole a motley assortment of things with little or no value. The next morning, the Colonel's butler brings news of a murder at another nearby estate, the Cunninghams'. The victim is William Kirwan, the coachman. Inspector Forrester has taken charge of the investigation, and there is one physical clue: a torn piece of paper found in William's hand with a few words written on it, including "quarter to twelve", which was approximately the time of William's murder. Holmes takes an instant interest in the note.

One of the first facts to emerge is that there is a longstanding legal dispute between the Actons and the Cunninghams. Holmes interviews the two Cunningham men, young Alec and his ageing father. Alec tells Holmes that he saw the burglar struggling with William when a shot went off and William fell dead, and that the burglar ran off through a hedge to the road. The elder Cunningham claims that he was in his room smoking at the time, and Alec says that he had also still been up. A door had been forced open, but according to Alec's account, William and the burglar had struggled outside the house.

Holmes theorises that the murderer snatched the note because it could incriminate him/her, but did not realise that a scrap of it remained in William's hand. William's mother proves to be no help due to her old age, deafness, and lack of intelligence. Holmes, apparently still recovering from his previous strenuous case, seems to have a fit just as Forrester is about to mention the note to the Cunninghams. Afterward, Holmes remarks that it is extraordinary that a burglar would break into the Cunninghams' house when the Cunninghams were both still awake and had lamps lit. Holmes then apparently makes a mistake writing an advertisement that the elder Cunningham corrects.

Holmes insists on searching the Cunninghams' rooms despite their protests that the burglar could not have gone there. He sees Alec's room and then his father's, where he deliberately knocks a small table over, sending some oranges and a water carafe to the floor. The others were not looking his way at the time, and Holmes implies that the cause is Watson's clumsiness. Watson plays along and starts gathering up the scattered fruit.

Everyone then notices that Holmes has left the elder Cunningham's room, and father and son both rush out in search of him. Moments later, Holmes is heard calling for help from Alec's room, where Watson and Forrester find Alec trying to strangle Holmes and the father twisting his wrist. Both are quickly restrained, and Holmes advises Forrester to arrest them for William's murder. The guilty looks on their faces, and Alec's attempt to draw a revolver, convince Forrester that Holmes' accusation is valid.

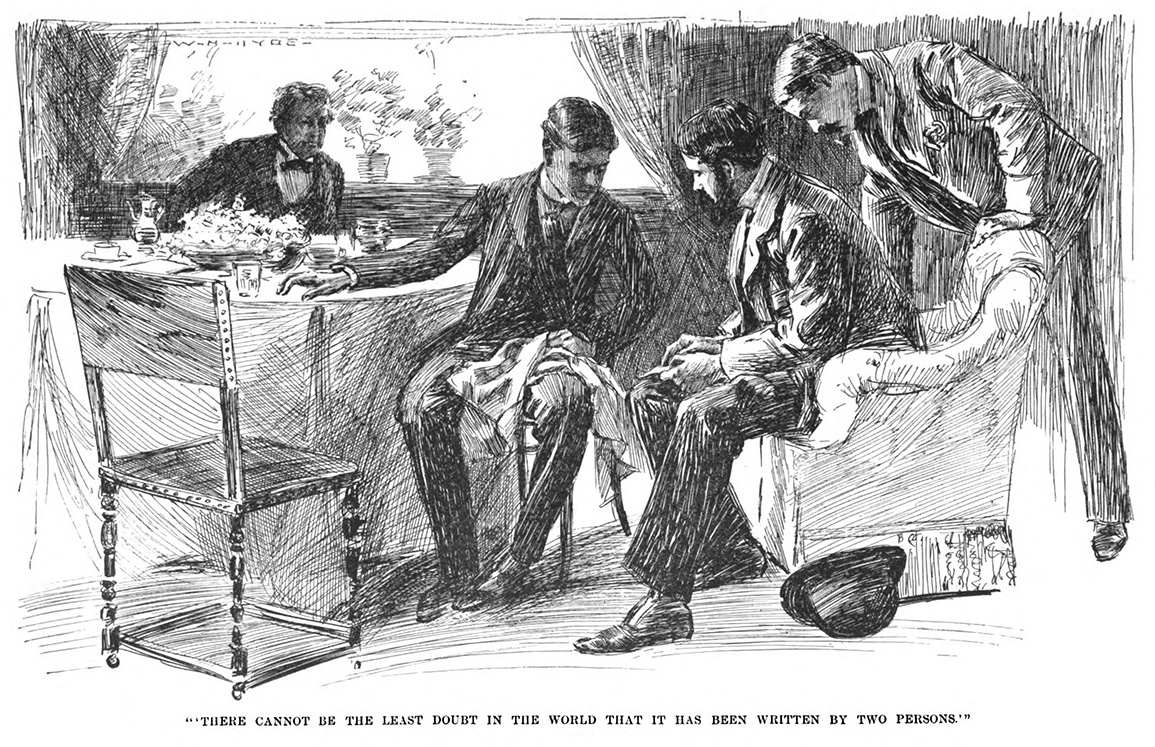
1893 illustration by W. H. Hyde in Harper's Weekly

Holmes had found the remainder of the note in the pocket of Alec's dressing-gown. It ran thus (the words in boldface are the ones on the original scrap):

"If you will only come round at quarter to twelve
to the east gate you will learn what
will very much surprise you and maybe [sic]
be of the greatest service to you and also
to Annie Morrison. But say nothing to anyone
upon the matter."

Holmes, an expert at studying handwriting, reveals that he had realised earlier from the torn piece of paper that the note was written by two men, each writing alternate words. He had perceived that one man was young, the other rather older, and that they were related, which led Holmes to conclude that the Cunninghams wrote the note. Holmes saw that the Cunninghams' story was false since William's body has no powder burns on it, so he was not shot at point-blank range as the Cunninghams claim. The escape route also does not bear their story out: there is a boggy ditch next to the road that the fleeing murderer would have had to cross, yet there are no signs of any footprints in it. Holmes had faked his fit to prevent the Cunninghams from being reminded about and destroying the missing part of the note, and made a mistake in the advertisement on purpose to get the elder Cunningham to write the word "twelve" by hand, to compare it with the note fragment.

The elder Cunningham's confidence is broken after his arrest and he tells all. Holmes had already deduced that he and his son were responsible for the Acton burglary; they had broken in to search for documents supporting Mr. Acton's legal claim against them, but found none. William had apparently learned of the crime and decided to blackmail them, not realising that it was dangerous to do such a thing to Alec. The Cunninghams wrote the note as bait to trap William, using the recent burglary scare as a plausible way to explain his death. Holmes remarks that they might have succeeded if they had recovered the entire note and paid more attention to detail.

== Holmes and Watson ==
This is one of the rare stories that show a glimpse of Watson's dedication and his life before he met Holmes, as well as Holmes' trust in Watson. Colonel Hayter is a former patient whom Watson treated in Afghanistan and has offered his house to Watson and Holmes. Watson admits in convincing Holmes, "A little diplomacy was needed," for Holmes resists anything that sounds like coddling or sentimentalism. Watson also glosses over the facts of Holmes' illness from overwork, implying redundancy because all of Europe was "ringing with his name."

Holmes' health has collapsed after straining himself to the limit, and his success in the case means nothing to him in the face of his depression. With his superhuman physical and mental achievement, he has a correspondingly drastic fit of nervous prostration and needs Watson's assistance. Holmes clearly has no problem with asking Watson for help when he needs it, for he sends a wire and Watson is at his side twenty-four hours later. At the onset of the mystery, Watson warns Holmes to rest, not to get started on a new problem. However, Watson knows and has revealed in other writings that inactivity is anathema to Holmes, and his caution comes off as weak. Holmes takes it all with humour, but the reader does not doubt his mind is eagerly upon the trail of the crime. At the conclusion, he tells Watson: "I think our quiet rest in the country has been a distinct success, and I shall certainly return much invigorated, to Baker Street to-morrow."

== Publication history ==
The story only bore the title "The Adventure of the Reigate Squire" when it was published in The Strand Magazine. When it was collected into book form, it was called "The Reigate Squires", the name under which it is most often known.

The story was published in the UK in The Strand Magazine in June 1893, and in the US in Harper's Weekly on 17 June 1893. It was also published in the US edition of the Strand in July 1893. It was published in Harper's Weekly as "The Reigate Puzzle". The story was published with seven illustrations by Sidney Paget in The Strand Magazine, and with two illustrations by W. H. Hyde in Harper's Weekly. It was included in the short story collection The Memoirs of Sherlock Holmes, which was published in the UK in December 1893 and in the US in February 1894.

== Adaptations ==
=== Film and television ===
One of the short films in the 1912 Éclair film series was based on the story. The short film, titled The Reigate Squires, starred Georges Tréville as Sherlock Holmes.

The story was adapted as a short film, also titled The Reigate Squires, in 1922 as part of the Stoll film series starring Eille Norwood as Holmes.

"The Reigate Squires" was adapted for a 1951 TV episode of Sherlock Holmes starring Alan Wheatley as Holmes.

=== Radio and audio dramas ===
Edith Meiser adapted the story as an episode of the American radio series The Adventures of Sherlock Holmes with Richard Gordon as Sherlock Holmes and Leigh Lovell as Dr. Watson. The episode, titled "The Reigate Puzzle", aired on 29 December 1930. Another episode adapted from the story aired on 29 February 1936, under the title "The Adventure of the Reigate Puzzle" (with Gordon as Holmes and Harry West as Watson).

Meiser also adapted the story as an episode of the radio series The New Adventures of Sherlock Holmes with Basil Rathbone as Holmes and Nigel Bruce as Watson. The episode, titled "The Reigate Puzzle", aired on 26 February 1940.

A 1961 BBC Light Programme radio adaptation, titled "The Reigate Squires", was adapted by Michael Hardwick as part of the 1952–1969 radio series starring Carleton Hobbs as Holmes and Norman Shelley as Watson.

An adaptation titled "The Reigate Squires" aired on BBC radio in 1978, starring Barry Foster as Holmes and David Buck as Watson.

The story was adapted as an episode of CBS Radio Mystery Theater titled "The Reigate Mystery". The episode, which starred Gordon Gould as Sherlock Holmes and William Griffis as Dr. Watson, first aired in November 1982.

"The Reigate Squires" was dramatised for BBC Radio 4 in 1992 by Robert Forrest, as part of the 1989–1998 radio series starring Clive Merrison as Holmes and Michael Williams as Watson. It featured Peter Davison as Inspector Forrester, Roger Hammond as Mr Cunningham, Struan Rodger as Alec Cunningham, and Terence Edmond as Mr Acton.

A 2015 episode of The Classic Adventures of Sherlock Holmes, a series on the American radio show Imagination Theatre, was adapted from the story, with John Patrick Lowrie as Holmes and Lawrence Albert as Watson. The episode is titled "The Reigate Squires".

In 2024, the podcast Sherlock&Co adapted the story in a two-episodes adventure called "The Reigate Squire", starring Paul Waggot as Watson and Harry Attwell as Sherlock.
