= John Straker =

John Straker may refer to:

- John Straker, a fictional character in "The Adventure of Silver Blaze", an 1892 Sherlock Holmes story by Sir Arthur Conan Doyle
- John Straker, a fictional character in UFO, a science fiction TV series produced by Gerry and Sylvia Anderson
