= The Adventure of the Yellow Face =

Short story by Arthur Conan Doyle featuring Sherlock Holmes

- Short story by Arthur Conan Doyle
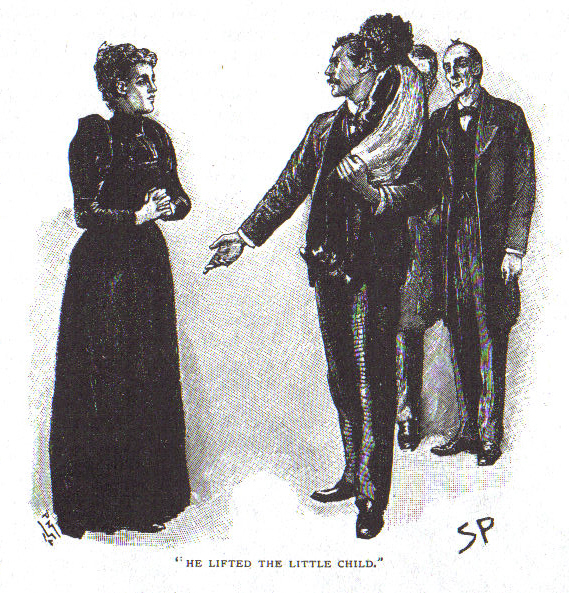
- Grant Munro lifts Lucy whilst Effie looks on, 1893 illustration by Sidney Paget in The Strand Magazine

Text available at Wikisource
- Country: United Kingdom
- Language: English
- Genre: Detective fiction short stories

Publication
- Published in: Strand Magazine
- Publication date: February 1893

Chronology
- Series: The Memoirs of Sherlock Holmes
The Adventure of the Cardboard Box	The Adventure of the Stockbroker's Clerk

"The Adventure of the Yellow Face", one of the 56 short Sherlock Holmes stories written by Sir Arthur Conan Doyle, is the third tale from The Memoirs of Sherlock Holmes. It was first published in The Strand Magazine in the United Kingdom in February 1893, and in Harper's Weekly in the United States on 11 February 1893.

One of Doyle's sentimental pieces, the story is remarkable in that Holmes' deduction during the course of it proves incorrect. According to Dr. Watson:

...where he failed it happened too often that no one else succeeded... Now and again, however, it chanced that even when he erred the truth was still discovered.

== Plot ==
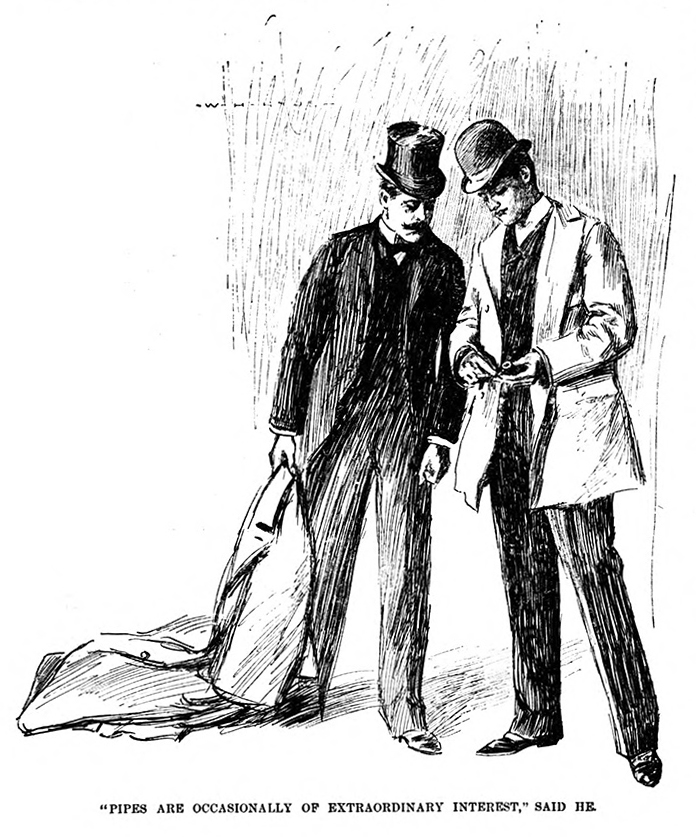
Holmes examines the visitor's pipe, 1893 illustration by W. H. Hyde in Harper's Weekly

Sherlock Holmes, bored due to a want of cases, returns home from a walk with Dr. Watson early in spring to find he has missed a visitor but that the caller has left his pipe behind. From it, Holmes deduces that he was disturbed of mind (because he forgot the pipe); that he valued it highly (because he had repaired it with silver bands which cost more than the pipe cost, rather than replacing it, when it was broken); that he was muscular, left-handed, had excellent teeth, was careless in his habits (because of the tooth marks in the pipe stem and the burn patterns on the pipe bowl) and did not need to practice economy (because the pipe is packed with an expensive blend of tobacco).

None of these deductions are particularly germane to the story: they are merely Holmesian logical exercises. When the visitor, Mr. Grant Munro (whose name Holmes observed from his hatband) returns, Holmes and Watson hear the story of Munro's deception by his wife Effie. She had been previously married in America, but her husband and child had died of yellow fever, whereupon she returned to England and met and married Munro. Their marriage had been blissful until Effie asked for £100 (equivalent to £11,110 in 2025) and begged him not to ask why. Two months later, Effie Munro was caught conducting secret liaisons with the occupants of a cottage near the Munro house in Norbury. Grant Munro has seen a mysterious yellow-faced person in this cottage. Overcome with jealousy, he breaks in and finds the place empty. However, the room where he saw the mysterious figure is very comfortable and well furnished, with a portrait of his wife on the mantelpiece.

Holmes, after sending Munro home with instructions to wire for him if the cottage was reoccupied, confides in Watson his belief that the mysterious figure is Effie Munro's first husband. He postulates that the husband, having been left in America, has come to England to blackmail her.

After Munro summons Holmes and Watson, the three enter the cottage, brushing aside the entreaties of Effie Munro. They find the strange yellow-faced character, and Holmes peels the face away, showing it to be a mask, and revealing a young girl who is half-black. It is then revealed that Effie Munro's first husband was John Hebron, an African-American lawyer, who did die in America, but their daughter, Lucy, survived. At the time Effie came to England, she could not bring Lucy with her, as the child was still ill enough that the transition might have exacerbated her state. But later, after she and Grant were married, Effie got word that Lucy was alive and well. Upon hearing of this, Effie became overcome with desire to see her child again, so she asked for the hundred pounds and used it to bring Lucy and her nurse to England, and installed them in the cottage near the Munro house. She feared, however, that Grant might stop loving her if he found out that she was the mother of a mixed race child, so all the while, she had made every endeavour to keep Lucy's existence a secret.

Both Watson and Holmes are touched by Munro's response. Watson observes:

...when [Munro's] answer came it was one of which I love to think. He lifted the little child, kissed her, and then, still carrying her, he held his other hand out to his wife and turned towards the door. "We can talk about it more comfortably at home," said he. "I am not a very good man, Effie, but I think I am a better one than you have given me credit for being."

Holmes excuses himself and Watson, and, that evening, after they have returned to Baker Street, says:

Watson, if it should ever strike you that I am getting a little overconfident in my powers, or giving less pains to a case than it deserves, kindly whisper 'Norbury' in my ear, and I shall be infinitely obliged to you.

== Treatment of race ==
Doyle's sympathetic treatment of interracial marriage, between a white English woman and a black lawyer in Atlanta, Georgia, appears extraordinarily liberal for the 1890s. Though the story has the widow treating her dead husband's race as a secret whose revelation might entail negative reactions, the marriage is not illegal in Britain, and her second husband's loving response is reported approvingly by Watson. This story, however, should be set alongside Doyle's stereotyped caricature of a thuggish black boxer, in "The Adventure of the Three Gables" (1926).

== Publication history ==
"The Adventure of the Yellow Face" was published in the UK in The Strand Magazine in February 1893, and in the US in Harper's Weekly on 11 February 1893. It was also published in the US edition of The Strand Magazine in March 1893. The story was published with seven illustrations by Sidney Paget in the Strand, and with two illustrations by W. H. Hyde in Harper's Weekly. It was included in the short story collection The Memoirs of Sherlock Holmes, which was published in December 1893 in the UK and February 1894 in the US.

== Adaptations ==
=== Film and television ===
The story was adapted as a short film released in 1921 as part of the Stoll film series, featuring Eille Norwood as Holmes.

The story is also alluded to in the BBC television series Sherlock where a yellow smiley face is painted on the wall of Sherlock's flat. Additionally, quotes from the story are used as plot points in "The Lying Detective". In addition, the town of Norbury from the story is represented in the episode "The Six Thatchers" in the form of Vivian Norbury, the main adversary of the episode.

=== Radio and audio dramas ===
Edith Meiser adapted the story as an episode of the American radio series The Adventures of Sherlock Holmes that was broadcast on 14 January 1932, with Richard Gordon as Holmes and Leigh Lovell as Watson.

"The Yellow Face" was dramatised by Gerry Jones for BBC Radio 4 in 1992 as an episode of the 1989–1998 radio series starring Clive Merrison as Holmes and Michael Williams as Watson. It featured Helena Breck as Effie Munro.

The story was adapted for radio in 2005 as part of The Classic Adventures of Sherlock Holmes, a series on the American radio show Imagination Theatre, with John Patrick Lowrie as Holmes and Lawrence Albert as Watson. It was the first episode in the series.
