= The Adventure of the Cardboard Box =

Short story by Arthur Conan Doyle featuring Sherlock Holmes

- Short story by Arthur Conan Doyle
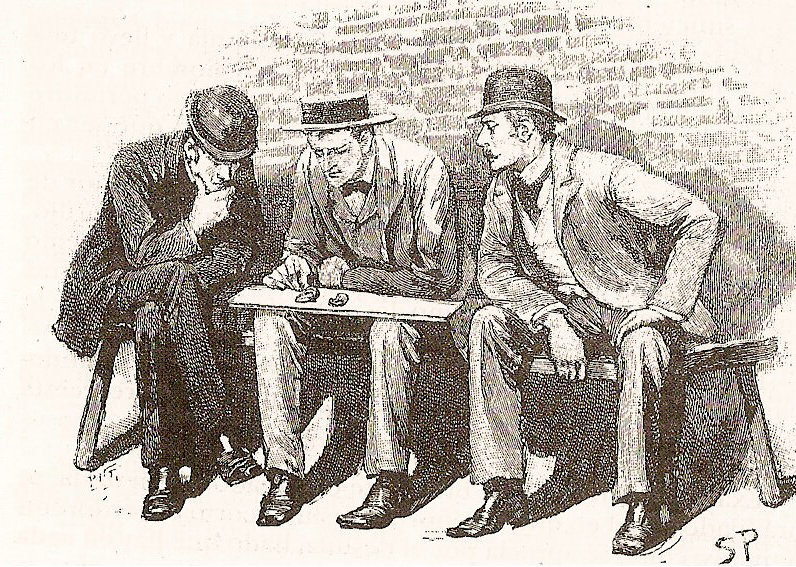
- Holmes examining the ears, 1893 illustration by Sidney Paget in The Strand Magazine
- Country: United Kingdom
- Language: English
- Genre: Detective fiction short stories

Publication
- Published in: Strand Magazine
- Publication date: January 1893

Chronology
- Series: The Memoirs of Sherlock Holmes and His Last Bow
The Adventure of Silver Blaze	The Adventure of the Yellow Face

"The Adventure of the Cardboard Box" is one of the 56 short Sherlock Holmes stories written by Sir Arthur Conan Doyle. The story was first published in The Strand Magazine in the United Kingdom in January 1893, and in Harper's Weekly in the United States on 14 January 1893. It is the second of twelve stories collected in The Memoirs of Sherlock Holmes in most British editions of the canon, and the second of the eight stories from His Last Bow in most American versions.

== Plot ==
Miss Susan Cushing of Croydon receives a parcel in the post that contains two severed human ears packed in coarse salt. Inspector Lestrade of Scotland Yard suspects a prank by three medical students whom Susan was forced to evict because of their unruly behaviour. The parcel was sent from Belfast, the city of origin of one of the former boarders. Upon examining the parcel himself, Holmes is convinced that it is evidence of a serious crime. He reasons that a medical student with access to a dissection laboratory would likely use something other than plain salt to preserve human remains, and would be able to make a more precise cut than the roughly hacked ears suggest. The address on the package, roughly written and with a spelling correction, suggests to Holmes that the sender lacks education and is unfamiliar with Croydon. He further deduces that this person is a sailor, based on the particular method of tarring and knotting the string.

A few questions to Susan, a few observations, a cable to Liverpool, and an attempt to visit Susan's sister Sarah (thwarted by the latter's sudden illness) convince Holmes that the ears belong to Susan's other sister, Mary, and her extramarital lover, and that they have been murdered. He concludes that Mary's estranged husband, Jim Browner, is the murderer, and that Browner had sent the ears to the Cushings' house in Croydon (addressing it merely to "S. Cushing"), not knowing that Sarah had moved away. Browner, who is an unpleasant man when drunk, had meant to horrify Sarah because he ultimately blamed her for causing the trouble that led him to kill Mary and her lover.

After receiving an answer to his cable, Holmes gives Lestrade a note and asks him not to mention Holmes' name in connection with the case due to its simplicity. Two days later, he receives an envelope from Lestrade, which contains a note stating that Browner has been arrested and a copy of his confession. Browner is indeed a sailor, and Belfast was the first port where he had the chance to post the parcel. Lestrade, acting on Holmes's information, arrested him when his ship reached London. According to his confession, he and Sarah began to hate each other after he rejected her advances toward him. Sarah then began to plant suspicions in Mary's mind concerning Browner's fidelity and introduced her to another sailor, Alec Fairbairn. Despite Browner's orders that Fairbairn stay away from the household, he and Mary went out rowing one day; Browner followed them onto the water, killed them both, and sent an ear from each corpse to Sarah's old address in Croydon.

As Holmes finishes reading Browner's confession, he muses to Watson, "What object is served by this circle of misery and violence and fear?" He has no immediate answer, wondering if human reason will ever be able to find one.

== Publication history ==
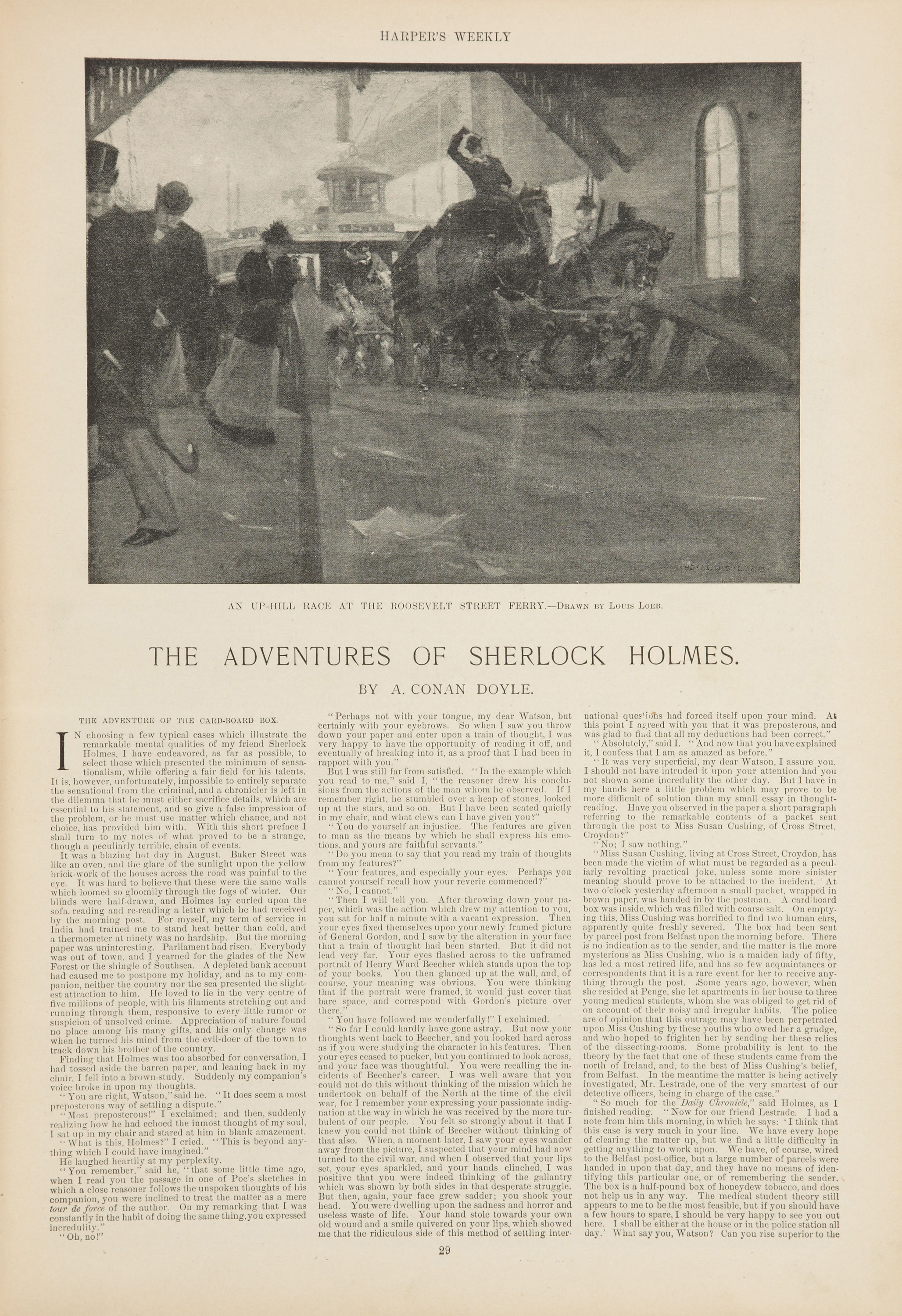
"The Adventure of the Cardboard Box" was published in Harper's Weekly on January 14, 1893. (An unrelated illustration by Louis Loeb precedes the story.)

The story was published in the UK in The Strand Magazine in January 1893, and in the US in Harper's Weekly on 14 January 1893. It was also published in the US edition of the Strand in February 1893. In The Strand Magazine, the story included eight illustrations by Sidney Paget. It did not include any illustrations in Harper's Weekly.

"The Adventure of the Cardboard Box" was not published in the first British edition of The Memoirs of Sherlock Holmes, but it was published in the first American edition, though it was quickly removed because of its controversial subject matter. The story was later published again in 1917 in His Last Bow. Even today, most American editions of the canon include it with His Last Bow, while most British editions keep the story in its original place, within the Memoirs.

When "The Adventure of the Cardboard Box" was removed from publication, Conan Doyle moved a passage from it that showed Holmes "mind reading" Watson to "The Adventure of the Resident Patient". (The text of the moved passage runs from "Our blinds were half-drawn, and Holmes lay curled upon the sofa" to "I should not have intruded it upon your attention had you not shown some incredulity the other day.") This passage reveals Dr. Watson to be an avid admirer of Henry Ward Beecher, whose portrait he keeps at his home. The passage seems to have little to do with the mystery but may be a subtle reference to the theme of adultery as Beecher was famously put on trial for the offence in 1875, an event many contemporary readers would have remembered.

== Adaptations ==
=== Film and television ===
The story was adapted as a short silent film titled The Cardboard Box in 1923, as one of the short films in the Sherlock Holmes film series by Stoll Pictures. It starred Eille Norwood as Sherlock Holmes and Hubert Willis as Dr. Watson. Hilda Anthony played Mary Browner and Johnny Butt played James Browner.

The Granada TV adaptation with Jeremy Brett, televised on 11 April 1994, was generally faithful to the original. In it, Browner was portrayed by Ciarán Hinds.

The Elementary episode "Ears to You" is a loose adaptation of this story.

The 2018 HBO Asia/Hulu Japan series Miss Sherlock loosely adapts this story as the episode "Stella Maris."

=== Radio and audio dramas ===
The story was adapted by Edith Meiser as an episode of the radio series The Adventures of Sherlock Holmes. The episode, which aired on 5 November 1931, featured Richard Gordon as Sherlock Holmes and Leigh Lovell as Dr. Watson. Another production of the story aired in September 1936, with Gordon as Holmes and Harry West as Watson.

Meiser also adapted the story for The New Adventures of Sherlock Holmes for episodes that aired in January 1940 and August 1943 with Basil Rathbone playing Holmes and Nigel Bruce playing Watson.

The story was adapted for the BBC Light Programme in 1960 by Michael Hardwick, as part of the 1952–1969 radio series starring Carleton Hobbs as Holmes and Norman Shelley as Watson.

"The Cardboard Box" was dramatised by Roger Danes for BBC Radio 4 in 1994 as an episode of the 1989–1998 radio series starring Clive Merrison as Holmes and Michael Williams as Watson (in the series for His Last Bow). It featured Kevin Whately as Browner and Teresa Gallagher as Mary Browner; it also introduced Stephen Thorne as Inspector Lestrade, who had previously been played by Donald Gee.

In 2010, the story was adapted as an episode of the radio series The Classic Adventures of Sherlock Holmes, with John Patrick Lowrie as Holmes and Lawrence Albert as Watson.

In 2024, the podcast Sherlock & Co. adapted the story in a two-episode adventure called "The Cardboard Box", starring Harry Attwell as Sherlock Holmes, Paul Waggott as Dr. John Watson and Marta da Silva as Mariana "Mrs. Hudson" Ametxazurra.
