= The Memoirs of Sherlock Holmes =

Collection of short stories by Arthur Conan Doyle

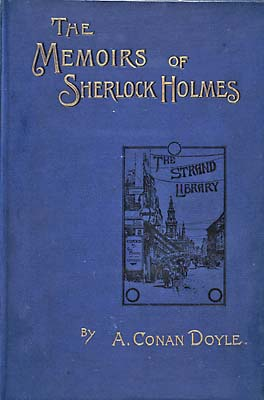
- Cover of The Memoirs of Sherlock Holmes
- Author: Arthur Conan Doyle
- Illustrator: Sidney Paget
- Language: English
- Series: Sherlock Holmes
- Genre: Detective fiction
- Publisher: George Newnes
- Publication date: 1893 (dated 1894)
- Publication place: United Kingdom
- Media type: Print (hardcover)
- Pages: viii, 279
- Preceded by: The Adventures of Sherlock Holmes
- Followed by: The Hound of the Baskervilles
- Text: The Memoirs of Sherlock Holmes at Wikisource

The Memoirs of Sherlock Holmes is a collection of short stories by British writer Arthur Conan Doyle, first published late in 1893 with 1894 date. It was first published in the UK by G. Newnes Ltd., and was published in the US by Harper & Brothers in February 1894. It was the second collection featuring the consulting detective Sherlock Holmes, following The Adventures of Sherlock Holmes. Like the first it was illustrated by Sidney Paget.

The twelve stories were originally published in The Strand Magazine from December 1892 to December 1893 as The Adventures number 13 to 24. For instance, "The Final Problem" was published under the subheading "XXIV.—The Adventure of the Final Problem." In the United States, the stories were first published in Harper's Weekly, except for "The Final Problem," which appeared in McClure's Magazine.

Doyle determined that these would be the last Holmes stories, and intended to kill off the character in "The Final Problem". Reader demand stimulated him to write another Holmes novel in 1901–1902, The Hound of the Baskervilles, set before "The Final Problem". The next year a new series, The Return of Sherlock Holmes, begins with the aftermath of "The Final Problem", in which it is revealed that Holmes actually survived.

== Contents ==
The sequence of stories matches that of the magazine series, December 1892 to December 1893, when "The Adventure of the Naval Treaty" was published in two parts, October and November.

1. "The Adventure of Silver Blaze"
2. "The Adventure of the Cardboard Box" – not in the first British edition, nor many other editions.
3. "The Adventure of the Yellow Face"
4. "The Adventure of the Stockbroker's Clerk"
5. "The Adventure of the Gloria Scott"
6. "The Adventure of the Musgrave Ritual"
7. "The Adventure of the Reigate Squire"
8. "The Adventure of the Crooked Man"
9. "The Adventure of the Resident Patient"
10. "The Adventure of the Greek Interpreter"
11. "The Adventure of the Naval Treaty"
12. "The Adventure of the Final Problem"

=== Omissions of "The Adventure of the Cardboard Box" ===
The first London edition of the Memoirs in 1894 did not include "The Adventure of the Cardboard Box", although all twelve stories had appeared in the Strand Magazine. The first U.S. edition included the story, but it was very quickly replaced with a revised edition that omitted it. The reasoning behind the suppression is unclear. In Britain the story was apparently removed at Doyle's request as it included adultery and so was unsuitable for younger readers. This may have also been the cause for the rapid removal of the story from the U.S. edition, and some sources state that the publishers believed the story was too scandalous for the American public.

As a result, this story was not republished until many years later, when it was added to His Last Bow. Today, most American editions of the canon include it with His Last Bow, while most British editions keep the story in its original place in The Memoirs of Sherlock Holmes. Additionally, when the story was removed from the Memoirs, its opening pages, where Holmes emulates Dupin, were transferred to the beginning of "The Adventure of the Resident Patient". In some later U.S. editions of the Memoirs, which still omit "The Adventure of the Cardboard Box", this transfer still appears.

== Adaptations ==
Several series have included adaptations of all or almost all of the stories in The Memoirs of Sherlock Holmes. All the stories in the collection were adapted as short films for the Sherlock Holmes Stoll film series (1921–1923), and as part of the radio series The Adventures of Sherlock Holmes (1930–1936). All except "The Yellow Face" and "The Final Problem" were dramatised in the radio series The New Adventures of Sherlock Holmes (1939–1950), and all except "The Yellow Face" and "The Gloria Scott" were adapted for BBC radio in the Sherlock Holmes 1952–1969 radio series.

Eight of the stories were adapted as episodes of the Granada television series (1984–1994). Only one story, "The Cardboard Box" was adapted for the last part of the series which had the title The Memoirs of Sherlock Holmes. All the stories in the collection were adapted for BBC Radio 4 as part of the BBC Sherlock Holmes 1989–1998 radio series, and all were adapted for the radio series The Classic Adventures of Sherlock Holmes (2005–2016). The individual stories included in the collection have also been adapted for various other productions.
