= The Adventure of Silver Blaze =

Short story by Arthur Conan Doyle featuring Sherlock Holmes

- Short story by Arthur Conan Doyle
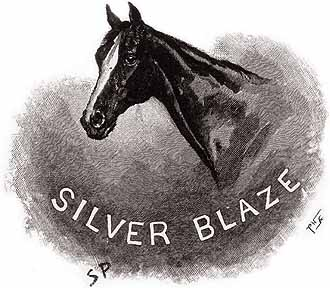
- The eponymous racehorse Silver Blaze, 1892 illustration by Sidney Paget in The Strand Magazine

Text available at Wikisource
- Country: Great Britain
- Language: English
- Genre: Detective fiction short stories

Publication
- Published in: The Strand Magazine
- Publication date: December 1892

Chronology
- Series: The Memoirs of Sherlock Holmes
The Adventures of Sherlock Holmes	The Adventure of the Cardboard Box

"The Adventure of Silver Blaze", one of the 56 Sherlock Holmes short stories written by Sir Arthur Conan Doyle, is the first from the 12 in the cycle collected as The Memoirs of Sherlock Holmes. It was first published in The Strand Magazine in December 1892.

Doyle considered "Silver Blaze" among his favourite Sherlock Holmes stories. One of the most popular Sherlock Holmes short stories, "Silver Blaze" focuses on the disappearance of the eponymous race horse (a famous winner, owned by a Colonel Ross) on the eve of an important race and on the apparent murder of his trainer. The tale is distinguished by its atmospheric Dartmoor setting and late-Victorian sporting milieu. The plotting hinges on the "curious incident of the dog in the night-time":

Gregory (Scotland Yard detective): Is there any other point to which you would wish to draw my attention?
Holmes: To the curious incident of the dog in the night-time.
Gregory: The dog did nothing in the night-time.
Holmes: That was the curious incident.

== Plot ==
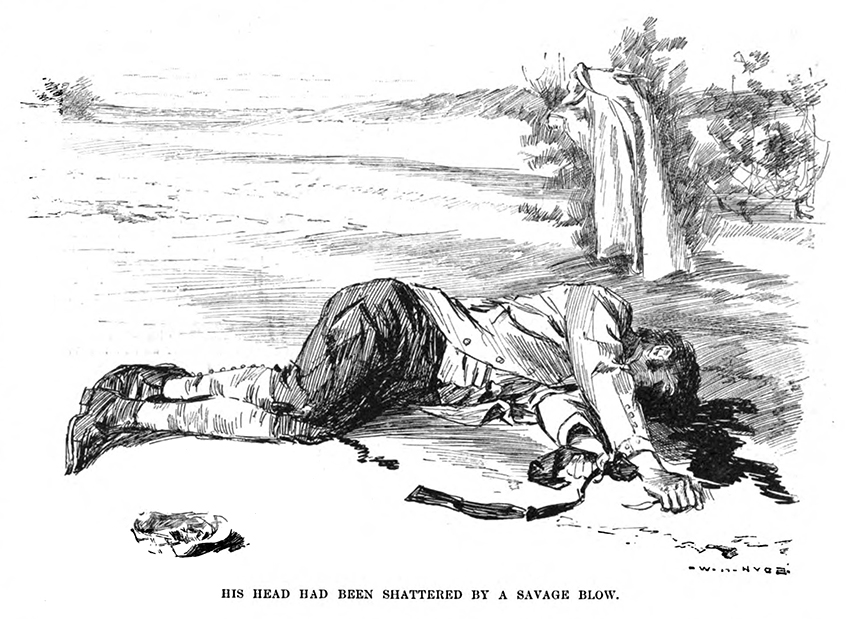
The body of John Straker, 1893 illustration by W. H. Hyde in Harper's Weekly

Sherlock Holmes and his partner, Dr. Watson, travel by train to Dartmoor to investigate a crime of disappearance of the great race horse Silver Blaze and the murder of the horse's trainer, John Straker. Holmes and Watson arrive at King's Pyland, from where Silver Blaze is missing. Bookmaker Fitzroy Simpson had come to Dartmoor (and specifically to King's Pyland) to gather information about Silver Blaze and his stablemate Bayard. He had approached both Straker's maid and a stable boy the night of the horse's disappearance and has been arrested for the murder. To Holmes, there seem to be a number of facts that do not fit the case against Simpson, damning as it looks. It seems odd that he would lead the horse out on to the moor simply to injure or kill him, which could be done in his stall. Had he stolen the animal, what good would such a famous thoroughbred be to him? Why has an exhaustive search of the neighbourhood not turned up Silver Blaze? What has Simpson done with him?

Sherlock Holmes soon tracks down Silver Blaze; his tracks (along with a man's) are clearly visible in the soil, albeit intermittently. Holmes also deduces why the police could not find the horse, despite having looked right at him. Holmes ensures Silver Blaze's safety, and turns his mind to other aspects of the case.

John Straker, Silver Blaze's late trainer, has been killed by a blow to the skull, assumed to have been administered by Simpson with his "Penang lawyer", a club-like walking stick. Simpson's cravat is also found in Straker's hand, and the latter's coat is found draped over a furze bush. A knife is found at the crime scene—a peculiarly delicate-looking one, with a small blade. Dr. Watson, from his medical experience, identifies it as a cataract knife used for the most delicate surgery—useful as it is for that purpose, it would be unsuitable as a weapon. Straker also seems to have gashed himself in the hip with it.

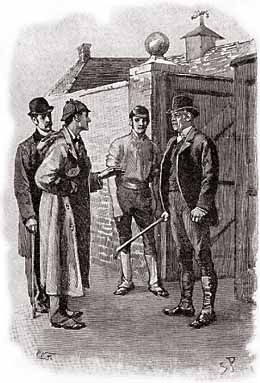
Holmes being confronted by Silas Brown, 1892 illustration by Sidney Paget

One of the stable lads, Ned Hunter, was on guard duty the night of the crime, but he proves to have been drugged with powdered opium placed in his supper. No one else who ate the curried mutton made at the Strakers' house that evening suffered any ill effects, but Hunter was in a profound stupor well into the next day. Straker's pockets contained a tallow candle and a milliner's bill for (among other things) a 22-guinea dress, made out to one William Derbyshire. There is the curious incident with the dog, and a problem with the sheep kept at the stable: The boy who looks after them tells Holmes that three of his animals have become suddenly lame.

Holmes's powers unravel the mystery and lay bare what villainies there are to be exposed. He visits the milliners' shop in London and determines, using Straker's photograph, that Straker posed as Derbyshire. This establishes his motive: He had a mistress with expensive tastes and tried to rig the race to earn himself a large sum of money. The curried mutton was a clue; only such a spicy dish could have masked the taste of powdered opium and it was impossible for Simpson to arrange a highly seasoned meal that evening for his purposes. Therefore, someone in the household must have conceived the idea, namely Straker.

The "curious incident of the dog in the night-time" is easily explained: the dog made no noise because no stranger was there. Holmes explains, "I had grasped the significance of the silence of the dog, for one true inference invariably suggests others ... Obviously, the midnight visitor was someone whom the dog knew well". It was Straker who removed Silver Blaze from his stall and led him out onto the moor. Straker's purpose in doing this was to use the cataract knife to inflict a slight injury upon one of the horse's legs, rendering him temporarily lame in a way that would be undetectable on examination and thus likely put down to strain. He had thought to use Simpson's cravat (which the latter dropped when he was expelled from King's Pyland) as a sling to hold the horse's leg to cut it. Straker was killed when the horse, sensing that something was wrong, panicked and kicked the trainer in the head. The lame sheep had been used by Straker for practice.

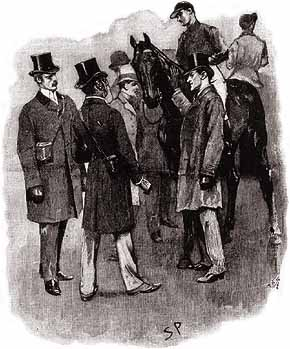
Holmes with Silver Blaze (forehead dyed), 1892 illustration by Sidney Paget

Colonel Ross's main concern, of course, is getting his horse back. Holmes chooses not to tell Ross where his horse has been (although he has known all along) until after the Wessex Cup, which is won by Silver Blaze. At first, the Colonel does not recognise his horse, since the animal's distinguishing white markings have been covered with dye. The horse had been looked after by one of the Colonel's neighbours, Silas Brown, who had found him wandering the moor and hidden him in his barn. Holmes then explains the details of the case step-by-step to the satisfaction of the Colonel, Watson and Inspector Gregory.

Gregory is one of the more competent police detectives with whom Holmes works in the course of his career. He conducts a thorough investigation of the crime before Holmes's arrival and gathers all the evidence Holmes needs to solve the case. Holmes notes that Gregory is "an extremely good officer" and observes that the only quality he lacks is imagination—the ability to imagine what might have happened and act on this intuition.

== Publication history ==
"The Adventure of Silver Blaze" was published in the UK in The Strand Magazine in December 1892, and in the United States in the US edition of the Strand in January 1893. It was also published in Harper's Weekly (US) on 25 February 1893. The story was published with nine illustrations by Sidney Paget in The Strand Magazine, and with two illustrations by W. H. Hyde in Harper's Weekly. It was included in the short story collection The Memoirs of Sherlock Holmes, which was published in December 1893 in the UK and February 1894 in the US.

== Adaptations ==
=== Film and television ===
One of the short films in the Sherlock Holmes Éclair film series (1912) was based on the story. Georges Tréville played Sherlock Holmes in the film series.

A short film adaptation was released in 1923 starring Eille Norwood in the role of Holmes and Hubert Willis cast as Dr. Watson. This was part of the 1921–1923 Sherlock Holmes Stoll film series, specifically the set of films released in 1923 under the series title The Last Adventures of Sherlock Holmes.

In 1937, the British film Silver Blaze was released starring Arthur Wontner as Holmes and Ian Fleming as Watson. The film was released in the United States four years later as Murder at the Baskervilles.

The story was adapted as the 1977 television film Silver Blaze starring Christopher Plummer as Holmes and Thorley Walters as Watson.

The story was adapted in 1988 for Granada television's The Return of Sherlock Holmes starring Jeremy Brett as Holmes and Edward Hardwicke as Watson.

An episode of the animated television series Sherlock Holmes in the 22nd Century was based on the story. The episode, titled "Silver Blaze", first aired in 1999.

In Elementary, season 2, episode 7 "The Marchioness", used elements from "Silver Blaze" in the plot.

=== Radio and audio dramas ===
"Silver Blaze" was adapted by Edith Meiser as an episode of the radio series The Adventures of Sherlock Holmes with Richard Gordon as Sherlock Holmes and Leigh Lovell as Dr. Watson. The episode aired on 8 December 1930. Other episodes adapted from the story aired in May 1935 (with Louis Hector as Holmes and Lovell as Watson) and in April 1936 (with Gordon as Holmes and Harry West as Watson). Meiser also adapted the story for The New Adventures of Sherlock Holmes for a 1939 episode with Basil Rathbone as Holmes and Nigel Bruce as Watson. It was also dramatised as a 1943 episode of the series.

A radio dramatisation of the story aired on British radio in 1938, titled "Sherlock Holmes and the Adventure of Silver Blaze". A different adaptation of the story aired on the BBC Home Service in 1945 with Laidman Browne as Holmes and Norman Shelley as Watson. A radio adaptation starring John Gielgud as Holmes and Ralph Richardson as Watson aired on NBC radio in March 1955.

A 1962 dramatisation of "Silver Blaze" aired on the BBC Light Programme, as part of the 1952–1969 radio series starring Carleton Hobbs as Holmes and Norman Shelley as Watson. Another adaptation aired on British radio in 1978, starring Barry Foster as Holmes and David Buck as Watson.

"Silver Blaze" was dramatised for BBC Radio 4 in 1992 by Bert Coules as an episode of the 1989–1998 radio series starring Clive Merrison as Holmes and Michael Williams as Watson. It featured Jack May as Colonel Ross, Susan Sheridan as Mrs Straker, Brett Usher as Silas Brown, Terence Edmond as Inspector Gregory, and Petra Markham as Edith.

A 2014 episode of the American radio series The Classic Adventures of Sherlock Holmes was adapted from the story, with John Patrick Lowrie as Holmes and Lawrence Albert as Watson.

In 2024, the podcast Sherlock & Co. adapted the story in a four-episodes adventure called "Silver Blaze", starring Harry Attwell as Holmes and Paul Waggott as Watson.

== Cultural impact ==
The title of the 2003 Mark Haddon novel The Curious Incident of the Dog in the Night-Time is taken from a remark made by Sherlock Holmes in "Silver Blaze". The protagonist of this novel, Christopher John Francis Boone, mentions Sherlock Holmes several times.

In the study of phase transitions in physics, the "Silver Blaze property" is where an order parameter describing the transition is precisely zero at temperatures or chemical potentials below the phase transition, becoming nonzero only at the transition. The name was chosen because of the analogy between the order parameter and the curious incident of the dog doing nothing in the night time, which provides Holmes with an essential clue.

In 1966, jigsaw manufacturer Springbok released a circular puzzle called "Silver Blaze – From the Memories of Sherlock Holmes". The goal was to solve the mystery using an enclosed story booklet combined with scenes depicted in the puzzle. A sealed solution was also included.

The story gave rise to the expression "the dog that did not bark", in which the absence of a response or action is considered a noteworthy element in a series of events.
