= The Adventure of the Resident Patient =

Short story by Arthur Conan Doyle featuring Sherlock Holmes

- Short story by Arthur Conan Doyle
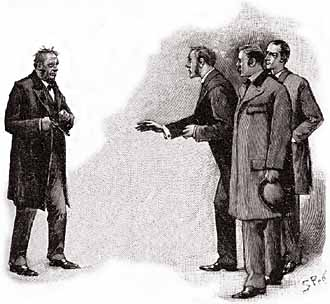
- Blessington, Trevelyan, Holmes and Watson, 1893 illustration by Sidney Paget in The Strand Magazine

Text available at Wikisource
- Country: United Kingdom
- Language: English
- Genre: Detective fiction short stories

Publication
- Published in: Strand Magazine
- Publication date: August 1893

Chronology
- Series: The Memoirs of Sherlock Holmes
The Adventure of the Crooked Man	The Adventure of the Greek Interpreter

"The Adventure of the Resident Patient", one of the 56 Sherlock Holmes short stories written by Sir Arthur Conan Doyle, is one of 12 stories in the cycle collected as The Memoirs of Sherlock Holmes. The story was originally published in The Strand Magazine in the United Kingdom and Harper's Weekly in the United States in August 1893.

Doyle ranked "The Adventure of the Resident Patient" eighteenth in a list of his nineteen favourite Sherlock Holmes stories.

== Plot ==
Holmes and Watson are consulted by Dr. Percy Trevelyan, a young general practitioner whose specialty is neurological disorders. Two years prior, having been a brilliant student but lacking the money to set up in practice, Trevelyan agreed to a strange business proposition put forward by a Mr. Blessington. Blessington bought a house in Brook Street, furnished it, paid servants, and purchased everything Dr. Trevelyan could need; All Trevelyan had to do was set up a consulting room. Each evening, Blessington would check the day's accounts and take three-quarters of the doctor's earnings, put it in his strong box, and leave the remainder for the doctor. Another unusual condition is having Blessington to live in the house as a permanent resident patient due to his heart trouble. The investment has made Blessington rich, and Trevelyan has become a well-known, respected doctor.

However, some months ago, Blessington panicked after claiming to have read a newspaper article about a nearby burglary; he insisted upon stronger locks and other stringent security measures, and also refused to leave the house for several weeks, only recently resuming his habit of taking his evening walk. Secondly, the evening before Trevelyan's visit to Holmes, an elderly Russian nobleman and his son consulted the doctor, due to the father's complaint of catalepsy. The son remained in the waiting room while the father spoke to the doctor – however, the old gentleman suffered a cataleptic attack while in the consulting room. Trevelyon spent several minutes looking for some amyl nitrite, but both father and son were gone when he returned with it. They visited again the next evening, apologizing for mistakenly believing the consultation was over the day before. Trevelyon again consulted the father while the son waited outside. After the pair left, Blessington returned from his walk, found footprints in his room, and entered into a state of panic again, insisting Trevelyan go and fetch Holmes to his aid.

Holmes and Watson return to Brook Street with the doctor, but Blessington refuses to admit to Holmes why he is obviously afraid for his life, or why there are men pursuing him. He instead pretends that he believes they are unknown burglars, who are after the fortune he keeps in the chest at the foot of his bed (which he does since he does not trust bankers). Holmes eventually leaves in disgust, advising Blessington that he cannot help him unless he tells the truth. However, by studying the footprints, Holmes has been able to confirm the doctor's story and eliminate him as a suspect. It was the nobleman's son who twice entered the room, first while his father (most likely) pretended to have a cataleptic seizure the day before, then a second time while the doctor was kept busy consulting the father, leaving wet footprints since it was rather rainy outside the second day. However, Blessington had been out walking both times, inadvertently frustrating his enemies.

The next morning, Holmes and Watson return to Brook Street at a summons from Trevelyan. Blessington has been found dead, having apparently hanged himself during the night. Holmes and Inspector Lanner of Scotland Yard examine the scene; Holmes is able to find convincing evidence (different brands of cigars/ash, footprints, tools left behind) that three intruders were in the house that night. Two of them are the supposed "Russian nobleman" and his son; the third is unknown. Signs indicate the trio were admitted into the house by a confederate, most likely the newly hired page. They then held a sort of mock-judicial proceeding against Blessington, "condemned" him, hanged him, and retreated, the confederate barring the door behind them.

Taking a photograph of Blessington, Holmes leaves to consult Scotland Yard's files, and returns with the news that he has identified Blessington as Sutton, one of the five members of the Worthingdon Bank Gang. The others were Cartwright, Biddle, Hayward, and Moffat. After the gang committed a massive robbery in 1875 where the bank's caretaker was killed, Sutton turned his four comrades in to the police in exchange for leniency. Cartwright was hanged for murdering the caretaker, and the other three got lengthy prison terms of 15 years apiece. To hide from them, Sutton changed his name to Blessington and moved in with Dr. Trevelyan. However, Sutton's comrades qualified for parole several years before their term was up; his first panic was when he read of their unexpected early release from prison. As he feared, they eventually hunted him down and murdered him to avenge Cartwright. Sutton was unable to tell Holmes the truth of the matter because he would have had to reveal his true identity, which, given the circumstances, he was too frightened and ashamed to do.

Lanner arrests the page and instigates a search, but Biddle, Hayward, and Moffat escape the country. The case against the page breaks down for lack of evidence, and the three murderers are suspected to have died in the wreck of the ship Nora Creina off the Portuguese coast.

== Publication history ==
"The Adventure of the Resident Patient" was published in the UK in The Strand Magazine in August 1893, and in the US in Harper's Weekly on 12 August 1893. It was also published in the US edition of The Strand Magazine in September 1893. The story was published with seven illustrations by Sidney Paget in the Strand, and with two illustrations by W. H. Hyde in Harper's Weekly. It was included in The Memoirs of Sherlock Holmes, which was published in December 1893 in the UK and February 1894 in the US.

In many editions, the story starts with the Holmes "mind-reading" scene from "The Adventure of the Cardboard Box", which was added to this story after Doyle decided the latter story should not be included in The Memoirs of Sherlock Holmes.

== Adaptations ==
=== Film and television ===
The story was adapted as a 1921 silent short film as part of the Stoll film series. It starred Eille Norwood as Holmes and Hubert Willis as Watson, and featured Judd Green as Blessington.

The Granada television adaptation of the canon starring Jeremy Brett featured an episode based on this story.

The ninth episode of Sherlock Holmes in the 22nd Century is based on this story.

=== Radio and audio dramas ===
Edith Meiser adapted the story as an episode of the American radio series The Adventures of Sherlock Holmes which aired on 12 January 1931, with Richard Gordon as Sherlock Holmes and Leigh Lovell as Dr. Watson. A remake of the script was broadcast on 14 March 1936 (with Gordon as Holmes and Harry West as Watson).

Edith Meiser also adapted the story as an episode of the American radio series The New Adventures of Sherlock Holmes, with Basil Rathbone as Holmes and Nigel Bruce as Watson, that was broadcast on 23 February 1941.

Michael Hardwick dramatised the story as a BBC Light Programme radio adaptation that aired in 1961, as part of the 1952–1969 radio series starring Carleton Hobbs as Holmes and Norman Shelley as Watson, with Hamilton Dyce as Trevelyan.

"The Resident Patient" was dramatised for BBC Radio 4 in 1992 by Peter Ling as part of the 1989–1998 radio series starring Clive Merrison as Holmes and Michael Williams as Watson. It featured Robert Lang as Blessington, Adjoa Andoh as Maria, and David Kossoff as Count Orlovsky.

The story was adapted as an episode of The Classic Adventures of Sherlock Holmes, a series on the American radio show Imagination Theatre, starring John Patrick Lowrie as Holmes and Lawrence Albert as Watson. The episode aired in 2009.

In 2024, the podcast Sherlock & Co. adapted the story in a three-episode adventure called "The Resident Patient", starring Harry Attwell as Holmes and Paul Waggott as Watson.
