= Henry Hutson =

English cricketer

Personal information
- Full name: Henry Wolseley Hutson
- Born: 26 July 1866; Georgetown, British Guiana
- Died: 25 March 1916 (aged 48); Wimbledon, Surrey, England

Domestic team information
- Years: Team
- 1899–1906: Berkshire
- 1886: Cambridge University

Career statistics
Competition	First-class
Matches	1
Runs scored	20
Batting average	10.00
100s/50s	0/0
Top score	20
Balls bowled	8
Wickets	0
Bowling average	–
5 wickets in innings	0
10 wickets in match	0
Best bowling	–
Catches/stumpings	1/–
- Source: Cricinfo, 7 October 2012

Henry Wolseley Hutson (26 July 1866 – 25 March 1916) was an English cricketer. He was born at Georgetown in British Guiana.

Hutson was the second son of Henry Hutson, MD, and his wife Cecil Lewis Pauline, daughter of William Bertie Wolseley, government secretary at Demerara; William was a grandson of Sir William Wolseley, 6th Baronet.

While undertaking studies at Jesus College, Cambridge, Hutson made a single first-class appearance for Cambridge University against CI Thornton's XI at Fenner's in 1886. In a match which Cambridge University won by 108 runs, Hutson was dismissed for a duck by Jack Crossland in Cambridge University's first-innings, while in their second-innings he was dismissed for 20 runs by Percy de Paravicini. Hutson later played minor counties cricket for Berkshire, making his debut for the county in the 1899 Minor Counties Championship against Northamptonshire. He made twenty further appearances for Berkshire, the last of which came against Devon in the 1906 Minor Counties Championship.

Hutson was commissioned an officer in the 3rd (Militia) Battalion, the King's (Liverpool Regiment). He was promoted to captain on 13 February 1900, and saw active service in South Africa during the Second Boer War, where he was Assistant Provost Marshal. Following the end of the war, Hutson left Cape Town for England on the SS Simla in July 1902.

He also worked in the brewing business. Having married and had a son, Major-General Henry Porter Wolseley Hutson (1893-1991), CB, DSO, OBE, MC, of the Royal Engineers, Hutson died at Wimbledon, Surrey, on 25 March 1916. His sister Eliza was the mother of the actor Carleton Hobbs, known for playing Sherlock Holmes on radio.
