= Sherlock Holmes (1989 radio series) =

BBC Radio series

- Michael Williams (left) and Clive Merrison in costume for a promotional shoot
- Genre: Radio drama
- Country of origin: United Kingdom
- Home station: BBC Radio 4
- Starring: Clive Merrison; Michael Williams
- Original release: 5 November 1989 – 5 July 1998
- No. of episodes: 64

Sherlock Holmes is the overall title given to the BBC Radio 4 radio dramatisations of the complete Sherlock Holmes stories, with Bert Coules as head writer, and featuring Clive Merrison as Holmes and Michael Williams as Dr Watson. Together, the two actors completed radio adaptations of every story in the canon of Sherlock Holmes between 1989 and 1998.

The episodes were not originally broadcast under an overall title, and aired in series with the same titles as the novels or short story collections that the episodes were adapted from. For instance, the first two episodes were based on the novel A Study in Scarlet and aired under that title on BBC Radio 4's Classic Serial programme.

Episodes of the series are available on CD as well as downloads, and are occasionally rebroadcast on BBC Radio 4 Extra.

From 2002 to 2010, Coules produced a follow-up series of original stories entitled The Further Adventures of Sherlock Holmes. Merrison returned as Holmes, whilst Watson was played by Andrew Sachs following Williams' death.

== Production ==
The BBC decided to produce radio adaptations of all sixty Sherlock Holmes stories by Arthur Conan Doyle due to the success of a 1988 radio adaptation of The Hound of the Baskervilles. David Johnston produced and directed the production, which was adapted by Bert Coules, and starred Roger Rees as Sherlock Holmes and Crawford Logan as Dr. Watson.

For the complete series of adaptations, Clive Merrison was cast as Holmes and Michael Williams as Watson. Both of the first two dramatisations of the series, adaptations of A Study in Scarlet and The Sign of the Four, were produced by David Johnston and directed by Ian Cotterell. Enyd Williams produced and directed the adaptation of The Valley of Fear and the 1998 version of The Hound of the Baskervilles. Each of the fifty-six short story adaptations were produced and directed by either Enyd Williams or Patrick Rayner. The head writer for the series was Bert Coules. The other writers were David Ashton, Michael Bakewell, Roger Danes, Robert Forrest, Denys Hawthorne, Gerry Jones, Peter Ling, Vincent McInerney and Peter Mackie.

The broadcast of the last dramatisation, the 1998 version of The Hound of the Baskervilles, marked the first time that the same two actors had played Holmes and Watson in dramatisations of all sixty stories on radio or any other medium. This was not accomplished again until 2016 when the American radio series The Classic Adventures of Sherlock Holmes was completed. It had almost been accomplished in the 1930s radio series The Adventures of Sherlock Holmes in which all but one of the stories (The Valley of Fear) were adapted.

Bert Coules wrote a book about the radio dramatisations of the Sherlock Holmes canon. The book, titled 221 BBC, also includes information about the follow-up BBC radio series The Further Adventures of Sherlock Holmes.

== Episodes ==
=== A Study In Scarlet ===
Two one-hour episodes adapted from A Study In Scarlet were recorded October 1989, at BBC studios, Maida Vale, London and first broadcast on 5 and 12 November 1989.

No. overall	No. in series	Episode title	First broadcast
1	1	"Revenge"	5 November 1989
2	2	"In the Country of the Saints"	12 November 1989

=== The Sign of the Four ===
The following episodes were adapted from the novel The Sign of the Four.

No. overall	No. in series	Episode title	First broadcast
3	1	"Timbertoe"	10 December 1989
4	2	"The Great Agra Treasure"	17 December 1989

=== The Adventures of Sherlock Holmes ===
The following episodes were adapted from the short story collection The Adventures of Sherlock Holmes.

No. overall	No. in series	Episode title	First broadcast
5	1	"A Scandal in Bohemia"	7 November 1990
6	2	"The Red-headed League"	14 November 1990
7	3	"A Case of Identity"	21 November 1990
8	4	"The Boscombe Valley Mystery"	28 November 1990
9	5	"The Five Orange Pips"	5 December 1990
10	6	"The Man with the Twisted Lip"	12 December 1990
11	7	"The Blue Carbuncle"	2 January 1991
12	8	"The Speckled Band"	9 January 1991
13	9	"The Engineer's Thumb"	16 January 1991
14	10	"The Noble Bachelor"	23 January 1991
15	11	"The Beryl Coronet"	30 January 1991
16	12	"The Copper Beeches"	6 February 1991

=== The Memoirs of Sherlock Holmes ===
The following episodes were adapted from The Memoirs of Sherlock Holmes.

No. overall	No. in series	Episode title	First broadcast
17	1	"Silver Blaze"	8 January 1992
18	2	"The Yellow Face"	15 January 1992
19	3	"The Stockbroker's Clerk"	22 January 1992
20	4	"The Gloria Scott"	29 January 1992
21	5	"The Musgrave Ritual"	5 February 1992
22	6	"The Reigate Squires"	12 February 1992
23	7	"The Crooked Man"	7 October 1992
24	8	"The Resident Patient"	14 October 1992
25	9	"The Greek Interpreter"	21 October 1992
26	10	"The Naval Treaty"	28 October 1992
27	11	"The Final Problem"	4 November 1992

=== The Return of Sherlock Holmes ===
The following episodes were adapted from The Return of Sherlock Holmes.

No. overall	No. in series	Episode title	First broadcast
28	1	"The Empty House"	24 February 1993
29	2	"The Norwood Builder"	3 March 1993
30	3	"The Dancing Men"	19 March 1993
31	4	"The Solitary Cyclist"	17 March 1993
32	5	"The Priory School"	24 March 1993
33	6	"Black Peter"	31 March 1993
34	7	"Charles Augustus Milverton"	7 April 1993
35	8	"The Six Napoleons"	8 September 1993
36	9	"The Three Students"	15 September 1993
37	10	"The Golden Pince-nez"	22 September 1993
38	11	"The Missing Three-quarter"	29 September 1993
39	12	"The Abbey Grange"	6 October 1993
40	13	"The Second Stain"	13 October 1993

=== His Last Bow ===
The following episodes were adapted from His Last Bow.

No. overall	No. in series	Episode title	First broadcast
41	1	"Wisteria Lodge"	5 January 1994
42	2	"The Cardboard Box"	12 January 1994
43	3	"The Red Circle"	19 January 1994
44	4	"The Bruce-Partington Plans"	26 January 1994
45	5	"The Dying Detective"	2 February 1994
46	6	"The Disappearance of Lady Frances Carfax"	9 February 1994
47	7	"The Devil's Foot"	16 February 1994
48	8	"His Last Bow"	23 February 1994

=== The Case-book of Sherlock Holmes ===
The following episodes were adapted from The Case-Book of Sherlock Holmes.

No. overall	No. in series	Episode title	First broadcast
49	1	"The Illustrious Client"	21 September 1994
50	2	"The Blanched Soldier"	28 September 1994
51	3	"The Mazarin Stone"	5 October 1994
52	4	"The Three Gables"	12 October 1994
53	5	"The Sussex Vampire"	19 October 1994
54	6	"The Three Garridebs"	16 October 1994
55	7	"The Problem of Thor Bridge"	22 February 1995
56	8	"The Creeping Man"	1 March 1995
57	9	"The Lion's Mane"	8 March 1995
58	10	"The Veiled Lodger"	15 March 1995
59	11	"Shoscombe Old Place"	22 March 1995
60	12	"The Retired Colourman"	29 March 1995

=== The Valley of Fear ===
The following episodes were adapted from the novel The Valley of Fear.

No. overall	No. in series	Episode title	First broadcast
61	1	"The Scowrers"	23 March 1997
62	2	"The Tragedy of Birlstone"	30 March 1997

=== The Hound of the Baskervilles ===
The following episodes were adapted from the novel The Hound of the Baskervilles.

No. overall	No. in series	Episode title	First broadcast
63	1	"The Powers of Evil"	28 June 1998
64	2	"Death On The Moor"	5 July 1998

== The Further Adventures of Sherlock Holmes ==
The Further Adventures of Sherlock Holmes, a series consisting of original stories written exclusively by Bert Coules was then commissioned, but following Williams' death from cancer in 2001, he was replaced by Andrew Sachs.

The episodes were based on throwaway references in Doyle's short stories and novels. They were broadcast on BBC Radio 4 across four series in 2002, 2004, 2008–2009 and 2010.

=== Episodes ===
No. overall	No. in series	Episode title	First broadcast
65	1	"The Madness of Colonel Warburton"	30 January 2002
66	2	"The Star of the Adelphi"	6 February 2002
67	3	"The Peculiar Persecution Of Mr John Vincent Harden"	13 February 2002
68	4	"The Singular Inheritance of Miss Gloria Wilson"	20 February 2002
69	5	"The Saviour of Cripplegate Square"	27 February 2002
70	6	"The Abergavenny Murder"	18 May 2004
71	7	"The Shameful Betrayal of Miss Emily Smith"	25 May 2004
72	8	"The Tragedy of Hanbury Street"	1 June 2004
73	9	"The Determined Client"	8 June 2004
74	10	"The Striking Success of Miss Franny Blossom"	15 June 2004
75	11	"The Remarkable Performance Of Mr Frederick Merridew"	26 December 2008
76	12	"The Eyes Of Horus"	2 January 2009
77	13	"The Thirteen Watches"	9 January 2009
78	14	"The Ferrers Documents"	16 January 2009
79	15	"The Marlbourne Point Mystery - Part 1"	5 April 2010
80	16	"The Marlbourne Point Mystery - Part 2"	6 April 2010

== See also ==
- Hercule Poirot (radio series)
- Miss Marple (radio series)
- Lord Peter Wimsey (radio series)
