= Carleton Hobbs =

English actor (1898–1978)

Carleton Hobbs OBE
- Born: Carleton Percy Hobbs; 18 June 1898; Farnborough, Hampshire, England
- Died: 31 July 1978 (aged 80); London, England
- Occupation: Actor
- Spouse: Gladys Ponsonby (m. 1934)

Carleton Percy Hobbs, OBE (18 June 1898 – 31 July 1978) was an English actor with many film, radio and television appearances. He portrayed Sherlock Holmes in 80 radio adaptations in a series of a series of Sherlock Holmes radio dramas (opposite Norman Shelley as Dr. Watson), and also starred in the radio adaptation of Evelyn Waugh's Sword of Honour.

== Early life and career ==
Hobbs was born in Farnborough, Hampshire, to Major-General Percy Eyre Francis Hobbs, of the Royal Army Service Corps, and his wife Eliza Anne, daughter of Henry Hutson, MD, of Georgetown, British Guiana. Her brother was cricketer Henry Wolseley Hutson. The Hobbs family, of Barnaboy, at Frankford (now called Kilcormac), King's County (now County Offaly), were a landed gentry family with a strong military tradition; Hobbs himself served in Royal Artillery during the First World War. He trained at RADA and worked in London theatres through the 1920s, but by the next decade had become a specialist radio actor. His first broadcast was in 1925 as Hastings in She Stoops to Conquer. The Marlow, Henry Oscar, then a more experienced broadcaster, pointed him back towards the microphone when necessary during transmission. In 1934, he married Gladys Ponsonby, to whom he remained married until his death. They had no children.

== Hobbs as Sherlock Holmes ==
For most of his broadcasting career he was a freelance, with the exception of the wartime period when the BBC formed its original Drama Repertory Company that could be moved out of London and away from the bombing. Hobbs was predictably one of its strengths, as was his regular future Dr. Watson, Norman Shelley. In fact, Hobbo – as everyone called him – had played Watson before he played Holmes, in a wartime production of The Boscombe Valley Mystery with Arthur Wontner as the sleuth.

His own Holmes became a familiar performance after the war, at first in children's programming, later in the general services. Despite Hobbs's acidulated voice and his often trenchant or sardonic delivery, his rendering of the detective now sounds somewhat avuncular – perhaps because of its original youthful audience, perhaps by comparison with later performances in the role, which became freer and more eccentric. Shelley said after his long-time colleague's death: "There was only one thing for Hobbo ... the best and nothing less than the best."

Hobbs and Shelley starred as the detective duo for 17 years, from 1952 to 1969.

== Other work ==
Apart from Holmes, he seldom played the top lead – exceptions being the title role in King John and Hieronimo in The Spanish Tragedy.

As a regular in Children's Hour – usually in the "For Older Listeners" scheduling – he played, among much else, many of the parts in the "Alice" stories, some several times. One of his most distinctive characterisations was Kipling's Cat That Walked By Himself.

Another "non-human" voice, in adult drama, was his Lizard in Henry Reed's The Streets of Pompeii. He loved being in Reed's "Hilda Tablet" plays. He could do plain men like Major Liconda in Maugham's The Sacred Flame, and could convey great vulnerability which he did as simple old Adam in As You Like It, played both on radio and on record.

Hobbs did a good deal of television, and often played judges as he memorably did in Pennies From Heaven. Other TV appearances included Jude the Obscure (1971) as Dr Tetuphar, Lord Peter Wimsey, A Life of Bliss, Strange Report and I, Claudius. He also had a small role as a freemason in the BBC 1972 version of War and Peace. His film appearances were few, but included roles in The House That Dripped Blood (1971) and Dark Places (1973).

A little surprisingly, but indicating his versatility, he was in the original London stage production of John Osborne's Luther. He was a great verse reader, and his command of French was a great asset, especially in his many bookings on the Third Programme, later Radio Three. A younger colleague, Frank Duncan, spoke of his "attention to detail, and delicate craftsmanship."

One of the last parts in his fifty-year broadcasting career was Shakespeare's Justice Robert Shallow from Henry IV, Part 2.

== Honours and legacy ==
He was appointed an Officer of the Order of the British Empire (OBE) in the 1969 Queen's Birthday Honours for services to drama.

The Carleton Hobbs Bursary provides six-month contracts for young actors in the BBC's Radio Drama Company.
