= Sherlock Holmes (Stoll film series) =

1921–1923 film series

- Directed by: Maurice Elvey; George Ridgwell
- Written by: William J. Elliott; Charles Barnett; Dorothy Westlake; Geoffrey Malins; Patrick L. Mannock; Maurice Elvey
- Based on: The Sherlock Holmes stories by Sir Arthur Conan Doyle
- Produced by: Jeffrey Bernerd
- Starring: Eille Norwood; Hubert Willis; Arthur Cullin
- Production company: Stoll Pictures
- Distributed by: Stoll Pictures
- Country: United Kingdom
- Language: English

From 1921 to 1923, Stoll Pictures produced three series of silent black-and-white films based on Sir Arthur Conan Doyle's Sherlock Holmes stories. Forty-five short films and two feature-length films were produced featuring Eille Norwood in the role of Holmes and Hubert Willis cast as Dr. Watson with the exception of the final film, The Sign of Four, where Willis was replaced with Arthur Cullin. Consequently, Norwood holds the record for most appearances as Sherlock Holmes in film.

== Production ==
Sir Oswald Stoll, an Australian-born Irish theatre manager ran music halls and West End stages until World War I when he segued into film production. Beginning in 1919, Stoll opened a series of cinemas and purchased a disused aircraft factory to create the then-largest film studio in Britain.

In 1920, Stoll purchased the rights to produce films based on the Sherlock Holmes tales written by Sir Arthur Conan Doyle. Stoll embarked on the production of his first series of fifteen short films entitled The Adventures of Sherlock Holmes in 1921.

The films were directed by Maurice Elvey and then 59-year-old actor Eille Norwood was chosen to portray Sherlock Holmes, with Hubert Willis cast as Dr Watson.

Norwood was obsessed with portraying Holmes true to the written stories. He re-read all the stories published up to that time and even learned to play the violin. Norwood had a reputation as a very professional actor with an incredible ability with make-up and disguise. There is a story that when Elvey asked Norwood to do an impromptu screen test, Norwood excused himself to the dressing room and appeared a few minutes later "an entirely new person".

He had done very little in the way of make-up, and he had no accessories, but the transformation was remarkable – it was Sherlock Holmes who came in that door.

Norwood took pains to maintain faithfulness to the original stories, something Conan Doyle was so impressed with he awarded the actor a gift of a dressing gown which the actor wore in many of the films. However, Conan Doyle was critical of the choice to set the stories in modern times.

The initial series of fifteen shorts entitled The Adventures of Sherlock Holmes was so successful, that Stoll moved to film a feature-length adaptation of The Hound of the Baskervilles also in 1921.

Unlike Adventures, The Hound of the Baskervilles was less faithful to the original story. While The New York Times was less than enthused with the adaptation, Doyle enjoyed it, claiming "On seeing him [Eille Norwood] in The Hound of the Baskervilles I thought I had never seen anything more masterly."

Critical success returned with the second installment of fifteen short films entitled The Further Adventures of Sherlock Holmes in 1922. Elvey was replaced as director by George Ridgwell.

A final collection of fifteen shorts was released in 1923 entitled The Last Adventures of Sherlock Holmes. The series was successful enough to spawn one last feature-length film, The Sign of Four released later in 1923.

The Sign of Four featured a return of Maurice Elvey to the helm and the replacement of Hubert Willis with Arthur Cullin as Dr. Watson. Elvey considered Willis too old to play a romantic interest for Mary Morstan. Cullin had earlier assayed the role in 1916's The Valley of Fear opposite H. A. Sainstbury's Holmes.

The series producer was Jeffrey Bernerd. For The Adventures of Sherlock Holmes, the screenwriter was William J. Elliott, except for The Priory School, which was adapted by Charles Barnett. For The Further Adventures of Sherlock Holmes and The Last Adventures of Sherlock Holmes, the screenwriters were Geoffrey H. Malins and Patrick L. Mannock, except for The Musgrave Ritual and The Disappearance of Lady Frances Carfax, which were adapted by director George Ridgwell.

The short films vary in film length from 1536 feet (The Naval Treaty) to 2612 feet (A Case of Identity). The first feature film in the series, The Hound of the Baskervilles, is 5500 feet long, and the second feature film, The Sign of Four, is 6750 feet long.

In 2024 the British Film Institute announced a project to restore all 45 episodes and the two feature films. As part of the 2024 London Film Festival three restored episodes (A Scandal in Bohemia, The Golden Pince-Nez and The Final Problem) were shown as a special presentation at Alexandra Palace with an accompanying live performance of new scores composed by Joanna MacGregor, Neil Brand and Joseph Havlat.

== Cast ==
- Eille Norwood as Sherlock Holmes (all 45 shorts and 2 features)
- Hubert Willis as Dr. Watson (all 45 shorts and The Hound of the Baskervilles)
- Arthur Cullin as Dr. Watson (The Sign of Four)

== Films ==
=== Short films ===
==== The Adventures of Sherlock Holmes ====
- The Dying Detective (1921)
- The Devil's Foot (1921)
- A Case of Identity (1921)
- The Yellow Face (1921)
- The Red-Haired League (1921) based on "The Red-Headed League"
- The Resident Patient (1921)
- A Scandal in Bohemia (1921)
- The Man with the Twisted Lip (1921)
- The Beryl Coronet (1921)
- The Noble Bachelor (1921)
- The Copper Beeches (1921)
- The Empty House (1921)
- The Tiger of San Pedro (1921) based on "The Adventure of Wisteria Lodge"
- The Priory School (1921)
- The Solitary Cyclist (1921)

==== The Further Adventures of Sherlock Holmes ====
- Charles Augustus Milverton (1922)
- The Abbey Grange (1922)
- The Norwood Builder (1922)
- The Reigate Squires (1922)
- The Naval Treaty (1922)
- The Second Stain (1922)
- The Red Circle (1922)
- The Six Napoleons (1922)
- Black Peter (1922)
- The Bruce-Partington Plans (1922)
- The Stockbroker's Clerk (1922)
- The Boscombe Valley Mystery (1922)
- The Musgrave Ritual (1922)
- The Golden Pince-Nez (1922)
- The Greek Interpreter (1922)

==== The Last Adventures of Sherlock Holmes ====
- Silver Blaze (1923)
- The Speckled Band (1923)
- The Gloria Scott (1923)
- The Blue Carbuncle (1923)
- The Engineer's Thumb (1923)
- His Last Bow (1923)
- The Cardboard Box (1923)
- The Disappearance of Lady Frances Carfax (1923)
- The Three Students (1923)
- The Missing Three-Quarter (1923)
- The Mystery of Thor Bridge (1923) based on "The Problem of Thor Bridge"
- The Stone of Mazarin (1923) based on "The Adventure of the Mazarin Stone"
- The Mystery of the Dancing Men (1923) based on "The Adventure of the Dancing Men"
- The Crooked Man (1923)
- The Final Problem (1923)

=== Feature length films ===
- The Hound of the Baskervilles (1921)
- The Sign of Four (1923)

== Reception ==
Sir Arthur Conan Doyle himself praised Norwood's performance in the role of his creation.

He has that rare quality, which can only be described as glamour, which compels you to watch an actor eagerly even when he is doing nothing. He has the brooding eye which excites expectation and he has also a quite unrivaled power of disguise. My only criticism of the films is that they introduce telephones, motorcars and other luxuries of which the Victorian Holmes never dreamed.

Vincent Starrett stated that while the Stoll films were a little slow, their fidelity to the source material often surpassed later more elaborate adaptations.

Bioscope claimed that "As popular attractions, The Adventures of Sherlock Holmes are, in our opinion, considerably the best things yet shown by Stoll."
