= The Adventure of Black Peter =

- Short story by Arthur Conan Doyle
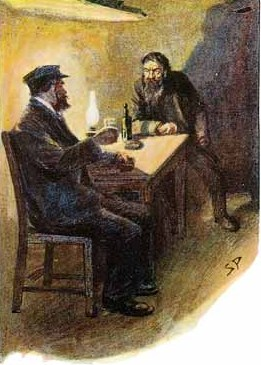
- Patrick Cairns and Peter Carey, 1904 illustration by Sidney Paget

Text available at Wikisource
- Country: United Kingdom
- Language: English
- Genre: Detective fiction short stories

Publication
- Published in: Strand Magazine
- Publication date: February 1904

Chronology
- Series: The Return of Sherlock Holmes
The Adventure of the Priory School	The Adventure of Charles Augustus Milverton

"The Adventure of Black Peter" is a Sherlock Holmes story by Arthur Conan Doyle. This tale is in the collection The Return of Sherlock Holmes. It was originally published in Collier's (US) in February 1904 and in The Strand Magazine (UK) in March 1904.

== Plot ==
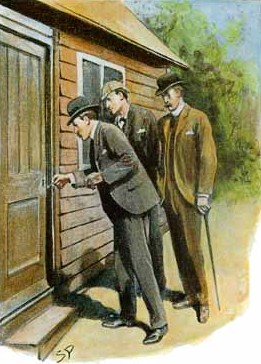
Holmes, Watson and Inspector Hopkins, 1904 illustration by Sidney Paget

Forest Row in the Weald is the scene of a harpoon murder, and a young police inspector, Stanley Hopkins, asks Holmes, whom he admires, for help. Holmes has already determined that it would take a great deal of strength and skill to run a man through with a harpoon and embed it in the wall behind him.

Peter Carey, the 50-year-old victim and former master of the whaler Sea Unicorn of Dundee, who lived with his wife and daughter, had a reputation for being violent. Carey did not sleep in the family house, but in a small hut that he built some distance from the house, whose interior he had decorated to look like a sailor's cabin on a ship. This is where he was found harpooned. Hopkins could find no footprints or other physical evidence. However, a tobacco pouch made of sealskin and with the initials "P.C." was found at the scene, full of strong ship's tobacco. This is rather unusual, as Peter Carey—or "Black Peter" as people called him—seldom smoked. Indeed, Hopkins found no pipe in the cabin. Carey was found fully dressed, suggesting that he was expecting a visitor, and there was some rum laid out along with two dirty glasses. There were brandy and whisky, too, but neither had been touched. There was also a knife in its sheath at Carey's feet; Mrs. Carey has identified it as her husband's. A little notebook was also found at the scene. It contains the initials J. H. N. and the year 1883. It also says C. P. R. on the second page, which Holmes reckons stands for Canadian Pacific Railway. The first set of initials is likely a stockbroker's, as the little book is full of what appears to be stock exchange information.

Holmes decides to accompany Hopkins to Forest Row and, upon arrival, Hopkins observes that someone has recently tried to break into Carey's cabin, but failed. After examining the inside of the cabin, Holmes deduces from the lack of dust that something has been taken from a shelf, even though the burglar did not get in. The stolen item was a book, or possibly a box. Holmes believes that the burglar will likely try again, this time bringing a more useful tool for the job. So, Holmes, Dr. Watson, and Hopkins all lie in wait for the burglar that night, and they are not disappointed. Along he comes, m breaks into the cabin, and goes through one of Carey's old logbooks, cursing when he finds that the information that he wants is missing, having been torn out of the book. As he is leaving the cabin, Hopkins moves in and arrests him.

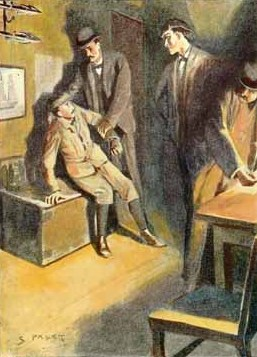
John Hopley Neligan is discovered, 1904 illustration by Sidney Paget

He is John Hopley Neligan—which matches the initials in the notebook—the son of a long-vanished, failed banker. He claims he was looking at Carey's logs to test a theory of his. His father disappeared with a box full of securities after his bank failed. He took them on a yacht bound for Norway. He believes that his father's boat may have been driven north in the North Sea by bad weather, and met the Sea Unicorn, captained by Carey. He believes that Carey knew something about his father's disappearance, and that possibly his father was murdered by the man who has now himself become a murder victim as he has traced some of his father's long lost securities back to Carey. Hopkins takes Neligan off to the station, even though Neligan swears that he has nothing to do with the murder. Holmes believes this to be true, because Neligan is a slight, anaemic thin man, hardly capable of running a man through with a harpoon.

Holmes saves Neligan from the noose by finding the true killer in a most unusual way. He advertises for a harpooner, posing as a sea captain named Basil. He gets three applicants at 221B Baker Street for the job, and one of them is indeed Peter Carey's killer, as confirmed by his name, Patrick Cairns, and the fact that Holmes had established that he was once Carey's shipmate. Holmes also felt sure that a murderer would want to leave the country for a while. Holmes handcuffs the unaware Cairns after which Cairns confesses. While he freely admits to killing Carey, he furiously denies that it was murder, claiming self-defence. He was actually at Carey's cabin to extort hush money from him. Neligan's father had indeed come aboard the Sea Unicorn with his tin box of securities, and Carey had murdered him by throwing him overboard while he believed no-one was looking, though Cairns had secretly witnessed the event. While Carey initially had agreed to the payoff, when Cairns came to collect, things were different. The two drank together, during which Carey's mood darkened. When Carey reached for his knife, which Cairns viewed as a threat, he took action, using a harpoon which decorated the cabin wall. Cairns escaped with the box of securities, leaving his tobacco pouch on the table. When he examined the securities later, he found them impossible for him to sell.

The rum was another clue: Holmes was sure that it, and the fact that the brandy and whiskey had been left alone, were sure signs that the killer was a seaman. Neligan is released and the securities returned to him, although the ones that Carey sold cannot be recovered.

== Publication history ==
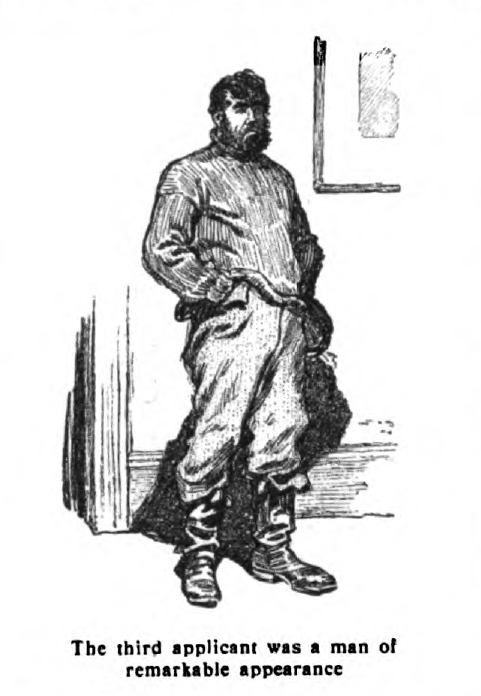
Patrick Cairns, 1904 illustration by Frederic Dorr Steele in Collier's

"The Adventure of Black Peter" was published in the US in Collier's on 27 February 1904, and in the UK in The Strand Magazine in March 1904. The story was published with six illustrations by Frederic Dorr Steele in Collier's, and with seven illustrations by Sidney Paget in the Strand. It was included in the short story collection The Return of Sherlock Holmes, which was published in the US in February 1905 and in the UK in March 1905.

== Adaptations ==
=== Film and television ===
A silent short film adapted from the story was released in 1922 as part of the Stoll film series starring Eille Norwood as Sherlock Holmes and Hubert Willis as Watson, with Teddy Arundell as Inspector Hopkins, Hugh Buckler as Patrick Cairns, and Fred Paul as Captain Peter Carey.

The story was adapted for the 1968 BBC series with Peter Cushing. The episode is now lost.

There is a visual reference to the "Black Peter" storyline in "The Hounds of Baskerville" (2012), the second episode of the second season of the BBC series Sherlock (2010–2017).

The first episode of the 2013 Russian TV series Sherlock Holmes is based on the story.

In March 2017, the US TV series Elementary (a modern version of Sherlock Holmes) used the "Black Peter" story as the basis for an episode called "Dead Man's Tale". The plot of the episode is driven by the search for the treasure of a pirate named Black Peter. The murder victim (one of the searchers) is impaled with a sword, and, like in the short story, a suspect named Neligan (a teenaged girl in this case; her father, named John Neligan, was also briefly suspected) is judged as being innocent due to lacking the strength to impale the victim.

=== Radio and audio dramas ===
A radio adaptation of "The Adventure of Black Peter", dramatised by Edith Meiser, aired on 11 May 1931 in the American radio series The Adventures of Sherlock Holmes, starring Richard Gordon as Sherlock Holmes and Leigh Lovell as Dr. Watson.

Edith Meiser also adapted the story as an episode of the American radio series The New Adventures of Sherlock Holmes, with Basil Rathbone as Holmes and Nigel Bruce as Watson, that aired on 8 December 1940. Another episode in the same series was adapted from the story by Max Ehrlich and aired in October 1948 (with John Stanley as Holmes and Wendell Holmes as Watson).

"Black Peter" was adapted twice for the 1952–1969 radio series starring Carleton Hobbs as Holmes and Norman Shelley as Watson. The first adaptation, dramatised by Alan Wilson, aired in March 1961 on the BBC Light Programme, and featured Michael Turner as Inspector Hopkins and Eric Woodburn as Cairns. The second adaptation, dramatised by Michael Hardwick, aired in July 1969 on BBC Radio 2, and featured Arnold Peters as Hopkins and Henry Stamper as Cairns.

An audio drama adaptation was released on LP record in 1970, as one of several audio dramas starring Robert Hardy as Holmes and Nigel Stock as Watson. It was dramatised and produced by Michael Hardwick (who also adapted the 1969 radio adaptation) and Mollie Hardwick.

"Black Peter" was dramatised for BBC Radio 4 in 1993 by David Ashton as part of the 1989–1998 radio series starring Clive Merrison as Holmes and Michael Williams as Watson. It featured Alex Norton as Cairns.

The story was adapted as a 2012 episode of The Classic Adventures of Sherlock Holmes, a series on the American radio show Imagination Theatre, starring John Patrick Lowrie as Holmes and Lawrence Albert as Watson.

In 2025, the podcast Sherlock & Co. adapted the story in a three-episode adventure called "Black Peter", starring Harry Attwell as Sherlock Holmes, Paul Waggott as Dr. John Watson and Marta da Silva as Mariana "Mrs. Hudson" Ametxazurra. In it, Peter Carey is instead a thrill-seeker famous for climbing various mountains that barely survived his final expedition with extreme frostbite, leading him to develop a black, beard-like marking on his chin. The ordeal apparently drove him completely insane, believing that he was under constant surveillance from unknown, shadowy organizations by all manner of modern conveniences ranging from Wi-Fi and to tap water; he subsequently turned violent against his own wife and children, as well as anyone else whom he believed had been 'poisoned' by the same forces he was attempting to avoid. Secluding himself near his home in East Sussex - invariably leading to Watson making numerous, compulsive references to Winnie the Pooh, due to the area serving as inspiration for the beloved character's home in the Hundred-Acre Woods - he would ultimately meet his end when Patrick Cairns, his partner and fellow survivor of the climb that seemingly stole his sanity, would kill him in self-defense with a harpoon gun when Peter attempted to attack him.

=== Other media ===
In 2014, Frogwares released a video game titled Sherlock Holmes: Crimes & Punishments, the first case of which "The Fate of Black Peter" adapts the elements of this story.
