= The Adventure of the Norwood Builder =

- Short story by Arthur Conan Doyle
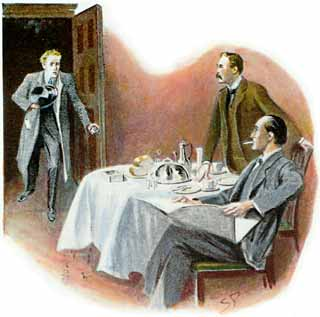
- McFarlane visiting Holmes and Watson, 1903 illustration by Sidney Paget

Text available at Wikisource
- Country: United Kingdom
- Language: English
- Genre: Detective fiction short stories

Publication
- Published in: Strand Magazine
- Publication date: November 1903

Chronology
- Series: The Return of Sherlock Holmes
The Adventure of the Empty House	The Adventure of the Dancing Men

"The Adventure of the Norwood Builder", one of the 56 short Sherlock Holmes stories written by Sir Arthur Conan Doyle, is the second tale from The Return of Sherlock Holmes. The story was first published in Collier's (US) on 31 October 1903 and in The Strand Magazine (UK) in November 1903.

== Plot ==
Sherlock Holmes and Dr. Watson are visited by John Hector McFarlane, a young lawyer from Blackheath who has been accused of murdering one of his clients – builder Jonas Oldacre. McFarlane explains to Holmes that Oldacre had come to his office the day before and asked him to draw up his will in proper legal form. To his surprise, Oldacre was making him the sole beneficiary to a considerable bequest. Later, McFarlane went to Oldacre's house in Lower Norwood to deliver the will and go over some additional documents. McFarlane left quite late and stayed at a local inn. On the train the next morning, he read in the newspaper about the apparent murder of Oldacre and that the police were looking for him.

The evidence against McFarlane is quite damning: bloodstains were found in Oldacre's study and on a walking stick McFarlane had left there, and behind the house is a pile of dry timber burnt to ashes and smelling of burnt flesh. Inspector Lestrade, who comes to arrest McFarlane, gloats in the apparent knowledge that he is on the right track. Holmes begins his own investigation by going to Blackheath instead of Norwood. There he learns that McFarlane's mother was once engaged to Oldacre but broke up with him once she found out his cruel nature. Holmes also notes that Oldacre's draft will was written in a very haphazard fashion, as if he did not care about its content. He also discovers large payments from Oldacre's bank account to a "Mr Cornelius". Holmes then visits Oldacre's house, where he inspects the study. Lestrade produces Oldacre's trouser buttons, found in the ashes of the fire. Holmes fears the worst: "All my instincts are in one direction, and all the facts are in another." Still, Holmes suspects Oldacre's housekeeper is deliberately withholding information.

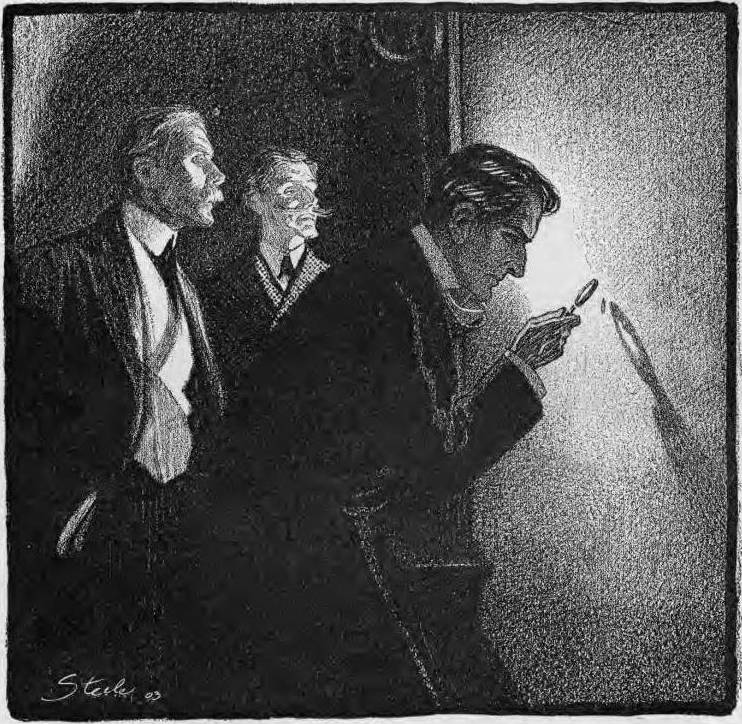
Holmes examines the thumbprint, 1903 illustration by Frederic Dorr Steele in Collier's

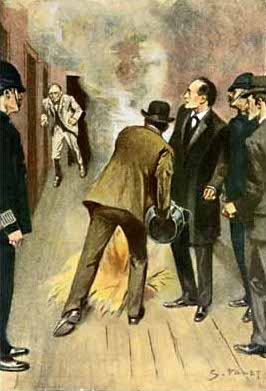
Oldacre appearing, 1903 illustration by Sidney Paget

The next morning, a bloody thumbprint is found at Oldacre's house that matches McFarlane's. This seems to be conclusive, as Lestrade smugly notes. However, Holmes is sure the thumbprint was not there in his previous inspection, and McFarlane could not have left it as he has been in police custody.

Holmes tells Lestrade there is another important witness to see, whom he offers to produce. Lestrade is dismissive but lets Holmes proceed. Holmes starts a small, smoky fire in the upper hall of the house and has the constables shout "Fire!" Oldacre emerges alive from a hidden chamber at the end of the hall. Holmes had deduced its existence by measuring the halls, noting that the upper one was several feet shorter than the lower. Oldacre staged his apparent murder to gain revenge against McFarlane's mother; he started the timber fire, threw his trousers and some small animals into the flames, and planted the bloodstains. He tries to pass off his actions as a practical joke but is taken into custody, along with the housekeeper as an accomplice. "Mr. Cornelius" is an alias to be used by Oldacre to evade his creditors. Holmes remarks to Lestrade that Oldacre's plot was nearly perfect, but he went one step too far by planting the thumbprint (from a wax seal that McFarlane had pressed). "He wished to improve what was already perfect," says Holmes, "and so he ruined everything."

== Background ==
Conan Doyle lived in South Norwood from 1891 to 1894, and so was very familiar with the area. There is however a good deal of ambiguity as to specific settings within the story. The Norwood where Oldacre lives for instance is called "Lower Norwood", which until around 1885 would have been the term used for what is now West Norwood. The story however was penned some time after this date, and Oldacre is described as living in "Deep Dene House, at the Sydenham end of the road of that name". South Norwood itself might be a logical candidate for Lower Norwood, however the only discernible connection between the story and South Norwood is that Norwood Junction railway station is used by Oldacre. McFarlane spends the night in The Anerley Arms, a pub that still exists and which has a derelict upper floor (no more overnight guests). It is now one of the Samuel Smith Old Brewery family of pubs and celebrates its connection with Sherlock Holmes.

This is one of the few Holmes stories in which a fingerprint provides a good clue to the nature of the problem. The wax thumbprint reproduction idea was devised by, and bought from, Bertram Fletcher Robinson (1870–1907), who also helped plot The Hound of the Baskervilles (1901).

At the start of the story, Watson mentions two unrecorded cases that Holmes investigated around the same time as this story:

- "The case of the papers of Ex-President Murillo", which Doyle later wrote as "The Adventure of Wisteria Lodge".
- "The shocking affair of the Dutch steamship Friesland", which loosely inspired a 1944 episode of the radio series The New Adventures of Sherlock Holmes and the 1945 film Pursuit to Algiers, both starring Basil Rathbone as Holmes.
- A reference to Professor Moriarty prefaces the story. "'From the point of view of the criminal expert', said Mr Sherlock Holmes, 'London has become a singularly uninteresting city since the death of the late lamented Moriarty'". Moriarty is mentioned in two other 1903 stories: "The Adventure of the Missing Three-Quarter" and "The Adventure of the Empty House".

== Publication history ==
"The Adventure of the Norwood Builder" was first published in the US in Collier's on 31 October 1903, and in the UK in The Strand Magazine in November 1903. The story was published with seven illustrations by Frederic Dorr Steele in Collier's, and with seven illustrations by Sidney Paget in the Strand. It was included in the short story collection The Return of Sherlock Holmes, which was published in the US in February 1905 and in the UK in March 1905.

The original manuscript of the story is now part of the Berg Collection at the New York Public Library.

== Adaptations ==
=== Film and television ===
The story was adapted as a short silent film released in 1922 as part of the Stoll film series starring Eille Norwood as Sherlock Holmes and Hubert Willis as Dr. Watson, with Cyril Raymond as John McFarlane and Teddy Arundell as Inspector Hopkins.

The Granada Sherlock Holmes television series with Jeremy Brett was faithful to the original story with a few exceptions. In the adaptation, Oldacre kills and burns a tramp, but in the book, he refuses to admit what flesh was burned. Mrs. McFarlane is a recent widow instead of her husband being alive but away. Watson instead of Holmes traces payments to Cornelius, and finally, Holmes instead of Lestrade, warns McFarlane that his words may be used against him.

In the first episode of season two of Elementary, Holmes mentions the Norwood Builder as a case he and Lestrade worked on in London.

=== Radio and audio dramas ===
A radio adaptation aired as an episode of the American radio series The Adventures of Sherlock Holmes. The episode was adapted by Edith Meiser and aired on 13 April 1931, with Richard Gordon as Sherlock Holmes and Leigh Lovell as Dr. Watson.

Meiser also adapted the story as an episode of the American radio series The New Adventures of Sherlock Holmes, with Basil Rathbone as Holmes and Nigel Bruce as Watson, that aired on 17 November 1940.

Felix Felton adapted the story for the BBC Home Service as part of the 1952–1969 radio series starring Carleton Hobbs as Holmes and Norman Shelley as Watson, with Felton as Inspector Lestrade and John Turnbull as Jonas Oldacre. The adaptation aired on 7 October 1954.

The story was adapted as an episode titled "The Tale of the Norwood Builder" in a series of radio adaptations starring John Gielgud as Holmes and Ralph Richardson as Watson. The episode aired on the BBC Light Programme on 23 November 1954 and NBC radio on 20 February 1955.

An audio drama based on the story was released in 1971 on one side of an LP record, as one of several recordings starring Robert Hardy as Holmes and Nigel Stock as Watson. It was dramatised and produced by Michael Hardwick and Mollie Hardwick.

"The Norwood Builder" was dramatised for BBC Radio 4 in 1993 by Bert Coules, as part of the 1989–1998 radio series starring Clive Merrison as Holmes and Michael Williams as Watson. It featured Peter Sallis as Jonas Oldacre, Donald Gee as Inspector Lestrade, and David Holt as John McFarlane. In it, because of his change of attitude towards fame (acquired while travelling in Tibet during his "death"), Holmes, at the beginning, informs Watson that "there must be no more stories" but that Watson should continue to keep notes on their cases to stockpile them for possible future publication. Also, after his capture, Oldacre reveals that he also believed Holmes to be dead.

The story was adapted as a 2007 episode of The Classic Adventures of Sherlock Holmes, a series on the American radio show Imagination Theatre, starring John Patrick Lowrie as Holmes and Lawrence Albert as Watson, with Rick May as Lestrade.

In 2025, the podcast Sherlock & Co. adapted the story in a four-episode adventure called "The Norwood Builder", starring Harry Attwell as Sherlock Holmes, Paul Waggott as Dr. John Watson, Marta da Silva as Mariana "Mrs. Hudson" Ametxazurra and Sharon D. Clarke as Gwen Lestrade.

=== Other media ===
The Wishbone Mysteries novel Forgotten Heroes (1998) references "The Adventure of the Norwood Builder".
