= The Adventure of the Six Napoleons =

- Short story by Arthur Conan Doyle
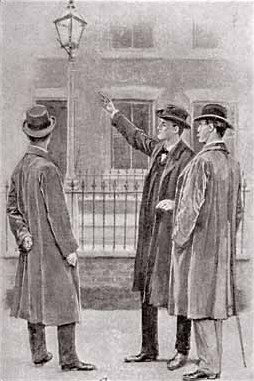
- Holmes pointing to a street lamp, 1904 illustration by Sidney Paget

Text available at Wikisource
- Country: United Kingdom
- Language: English
- Genre: Detective fiction short stories

Publication
- Published in: Strand Magazine
- Publication date: April 1904

Chronology
- Series: The Return of Sherlock Holmes
The Adventure of Charles Augustus Milverton	The Adventure of the Three Students

"The Adventure of the Six Napoleons", one of the 56 Sherlock Holmes short stories written by Sir Arthur Conan Doyle, is one of 13 stories in the cycle collected as The Return of Sherlock Holmes. It was first published in Collier's in the United States on 30 April 1904, and in The Strand Magazine in the United Kingdom in May 1904.

== Plot ==
Inspector Lestrade of Scotland Yard brings Holmes a mysterious problem about a man who shatters plaster busts of Napoleon. One was shattered in Morse Hudson's shop, and two others, sold by Hudson to a Dr. Barnicot, were smashed after the doctor's house and branch office had been burgled. Nothing else was taken. In the former case, the bust was taken outside before being broken.

Holmes knows that Lestrade's theory about a Napoleon-hating lunatic must be wrong. The busts in question all came from the same mould, when there are thousands of images of Napoleon all over London.

The next day, Lestrade calls Holmes to a house where there has been yet another bust-shattering, but there has also been a murder. Mr. Horace Harker found the dead man on his doorstep after investigating a noise. His Napoleon bust was also taken by a burglar entering through a window. It, too, was from the same mould. Also, a photograph of a rather ape-ish-looking man is found in the dead man's pocket.

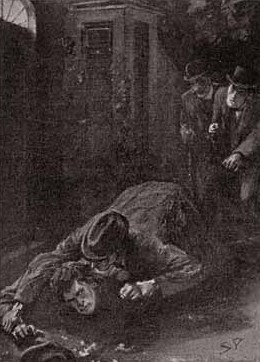
Beppo is caught, 1904 illustration by Sidney Paget.

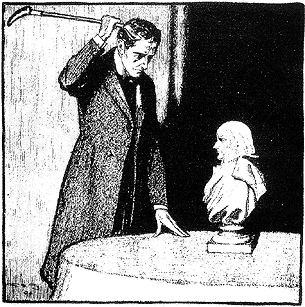
Holmes raising his hunting crop, 1904 illustration by Frederic Dorr Steele in Collier's.

The fragments of Harker's bust are in the front garden of an empty house up the street. Holmes concludes that the burglar wanted to see what he was doing, for there is a streetlamp here, whereas the bust could have been broken at another empty house nearer Harker's, but it had been dark there.

Holmes tells Lestrade to tell Harker, a journalist for the Central Press Syndicate, that he is convinced that the culprit is a lunatic. Holmes knows that this is not true, but it is expedient to use the press to convince the culprit that this is what the investigators believe.

Holmes interviews the two shopkeepers who sold the busts and finds out whom they were sold to, and where they were made, Gelder & Co. A couple of his informants also recognise the ape-ish man in the picture. They know him as Beppo, an Italian immigrant. He even worked in the shop where the first bust was broken, having left his job there only two days earlier.

Holmes goes to Gelder & Co. and finds out that the busts were part of a batch of six, but other than that, the manager can think of no reason why they should be special, or why anyone would want to destroy them. He recognises Beppo's picture, and describes him as a rascal. He was imprisoned for a street-fight stabbing a year earlier, but has likely been released now. He once worked at Gelder & Co., but has not been back. His cousin still works there. Holmes begs the manager not to talk to the cousin about Beppo.

That evening, Lestrade brings news that the dead man has been identified as Pietro Venucci, a Mafioso. Lestrade believes that Venucci was sent to kill the culprit, but wound up dead himself.

After sending an express message, Holmes invites Dr. Watson and Lestrade to join him outside a house in Chiswick where apparently Holmes is expecting another bust-breaking. Lestrade by now is exasperated with Holmes's preoccupation with the busts, but comes. They are not disappointed. Beppo shows up, enters the house, and comes back out of the window minutes later with a Napoleon bust, which he proceeds to shatter. He then examines the pieces, quite unaware that Holmes and Lestrade are sneaking up behind him. They pounce, and Beppo is arrested. He will not talk, however.

The mystery is at last laid bare after Holmes offers £10 (£1,050 in 2025) to the owner of the last existing bust, making him sign a document transferring all rights and ownership of the bust to Holmes. After the seller has left, Holmes smashes the bust with a hunting crop. Among the plaster shards is a gem, the black pearl of the Borgias. Holmes was aware of the case of its disappearance from the beginning. Suspicion had fallen on the owner's maid, whose name was Lucretia Venucci – the dead man's sister. Beppo somehow got the pearl from Pietro Venucci, and hid it inside a still-soft plaster bust at the factory where he worked, moments before his arrest for the street-fight stabbing.

After serving his one-year sentence, he sought to retrieve the hidden pearl. He found out from his cousin who bought the busts, and through his own efforts and his confederates’, even found out who the end buyers were. He then proceeded to seek the busts out, smashing them one by one to find the pearl.

== Details ==
Although he appears in later published works, this is one of Lestrade's last appearances within the official canon, near the midpoint of the 60 combined Holmes works by Doyle. After this he is only mentioned by Holmes or Watson – in "The Disappearance of Lady Frances Carfax" and "The Adventure of the Three Garridebs" – as a working member of the Yard.

The story's basic plot device is similar to that used by Doyle in the earlier "Adventure of the Blue Carbuncle" where a stolen gem was hidden inside the belly of a goose – but the criminal is not sure which of the similar geese holds the jewel.

== Publication history ==
"The Adventure of the Six Napoleons" was published in the US in Collier's on 30 April 1904, and in the UK in The Strand Magazine in May 1904. The story was published with six illustrations by Frederic Dorr Steele in Collier's, and with seven illustrations by Sidney Paget in the Strand. It was included in the short story collection The Return of Sherlock Holmes, which was published in the US in February 1905 and in the UK in March 1905.

== Adaptations ==
=== Film and television ===
The story was adapted as a short silent film titled The Six Napoleons (1922) in the Stoll film series starring Eille Norwood as Sherlock Holmes.

The Pearl of Death is a 1944 Sherlock Holmes film that is loosely based on "The Six Napoleons".

Dressed to Kill – also known as Prelude to Murder (working title) and Sherlock Holmes and the Secret Code (in the United Kingdom) – is a 1946 adaptation loosely based on "The Six Napoleons", the busts being replaced with musical boxes.

The episode of The Adventures of Superman TV series (Episode 4 of season 1) called "Mystery of the Broken Statues" is mainly based on "The Six Napoleons".

The 1965 television series Sherlock Holmes starring Douglas Wilmer as Holmes and Nigel Stock as Watson featured an adaptation of "The Six Napoleons".

This story was dramatised in the popular Granada Television Sherlock Holmes series starring Jeremy Brett. This version is faithful to the original story—although there is a twist. In the original story, Beppo is captured after killing Venucci and his punishment is left unsaid for the audience to guess. In the episode, Beppo had gone to prison for a year after wounding Venucci in a brawl; at the end, Beppo is hanged. Furthermore, Beppo's surname is Cicollini and his role is expanded to have been previously engaged to Lucretia Venucci. Marina Sirtis played Lucretia in this episode.

An episode of the animated television series Sherlock Holmes in the 22nd Century was based on the story. The episode, titled "The Adventure of the Six Napoleons", aired in 2001.

The opening episode of season 4 of the BBC series Sherlock is called "The Six Thatchers" and is based loosely on this story; at one point Sherlock believes that the suspect is hunting for the black pearl, which he had been asked to look into earlier and dismissed as uninteresting, but it is soon revealed that the suspect is actually hunting for a memory stick containing information about Mary Watson's past.

The American TV series on CBS Television, Elementary "The Further Adventures" also adapts the story. In the cold opening, a break-in occurs at 221-B Baker Street. We find Bernardo "Beppo" Pugliesi retrieving the last of 6 busts, sold from the Royal Wedding 2018. Holmes lets Beppo break the bust, and take the Pearl from the shards. Only to explain the history of Black Pearl, and how Beppo stole the pearl. The day after the original theft, he stabbed a man in a bar fight. Knowing he is being sought in the stabbing, he hid the pearl in his brother's ceramics factory, before his arrest. His brother made 1,000 busts, that were so ugly, he only sold 6. A year later, Beppo is paroled, and begins the search, leaving a trail of broken statues. In the robbery of the fifth, Beppo strangled the owner. Holmes purchased the last of the six, making quite a show of the purchase, such that Beppo comes to Baker Street. Later at Scotland Yard, Holmes destroys the Pearl. It was made of painted glass. The glass pearl contained a ring with a hollow compartment that Lucrezia Borgia put poison used to kill her family's enemies. When she fell out of favour with certain members of the Vatican, she was told to dispose of the ring, her favourite murder weapon. DCI Athelney Jones comments to Holmes, "My God, Holmes. You did not get the goods on one murder tonight, but two!"

=== Audio ===
A radio adaptation aired as an episode of the American radio series The Adventures of Sherlock Holmes. The episode was adapted by Edith Meiser and aired on 25 May 1931, with Richard Gordon as Sherlock Holmes and Leigh Lovell as Dr. Watson.

Meiser also adapted the story as an episode of the American radio series The New Adventures of Sherlock Holmes, with Basil Rathbone as Holmes and Nigel Bruce as Watson. The episode aired on 12 October 1941. Another episode in the same series adapted from the story aired on 7 March 1948, with John Stanley playing Holmes and Alfred Shirley playing Watson.

A radio adaptation of the story was broadcast on BBC Light Programme on 7 December 1954 with John Gielgud as Holmes and Ralph Richardson as Watson. The production aired on NBC radio on 6 March 1955.

Michael Hardwick adapted the story for the BBC Light Programme in 1966, as part of the 1952–1969 radio series starring Carleton Hobbs as Holmes and Norman Shelley as Watson.

An adaptation of the story aired on BBC radio in 1978, starring Barry Foster as Holmes and David Buck as Watson.

"The Six Napoleons" was dramatised for BBC Radio 4 in 1993 by Bert Coules as part of the 1989–1998 radio series starring Clive Merrison as Holmes and Michael Williams as Watson. It featured Donald Gee as Inspector Lestrade and Peter Penry-Jones as Horace Harker.

The story was adapted as a 2013 episode of The Classic Adventures of Sherlock Holmes, a series on the American radio show Imagination Theatre, starring John Patrick Lowrie as Holmes and Lawrence Albert as Watson.

In 2026, the podcast Sherlock & Co. adapted the story in a four-episode adventure called "The Six Napoleons", starring Harry Attwell as Sherlock Holmes, Paul Waggott as Dr. John Watson and Marta da Silva as Mariana "Mrs. Hudson" Ametxazurra.

=== Other media ===
The story is referenced in The Three Investigators book #7 The Mystery of the Fiery Eye which deals with a hidden gemstone and false clue of busts, used by a Holmes aficionado.
