= The Adventure of the Mazarin Stone =

- Short story by Arthur Conan Doyle
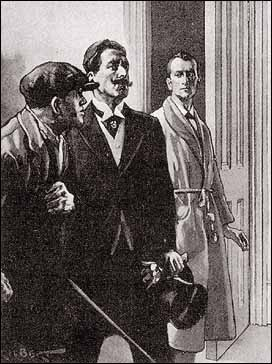
- 1921 illustration by Alfred Gilbert in The Strand Magazine.

Publication
- Publication date: October 1921

Chronology
- Series: The Case-Book of Sherlock Holmes
His Last Bow	The Problem of Thor Bridge

"The Adventure of the Mazarin Stone" is one of 12 Sherlock Holmes short stories by Arthur Conan Doyle in The Case-Book of Sherlock Holmes (1927). It was first published in The Strand Magazine in the United Kingdom in October 1921, and was also published in Hearst's International in the United States in November 1921.

== Plot ==
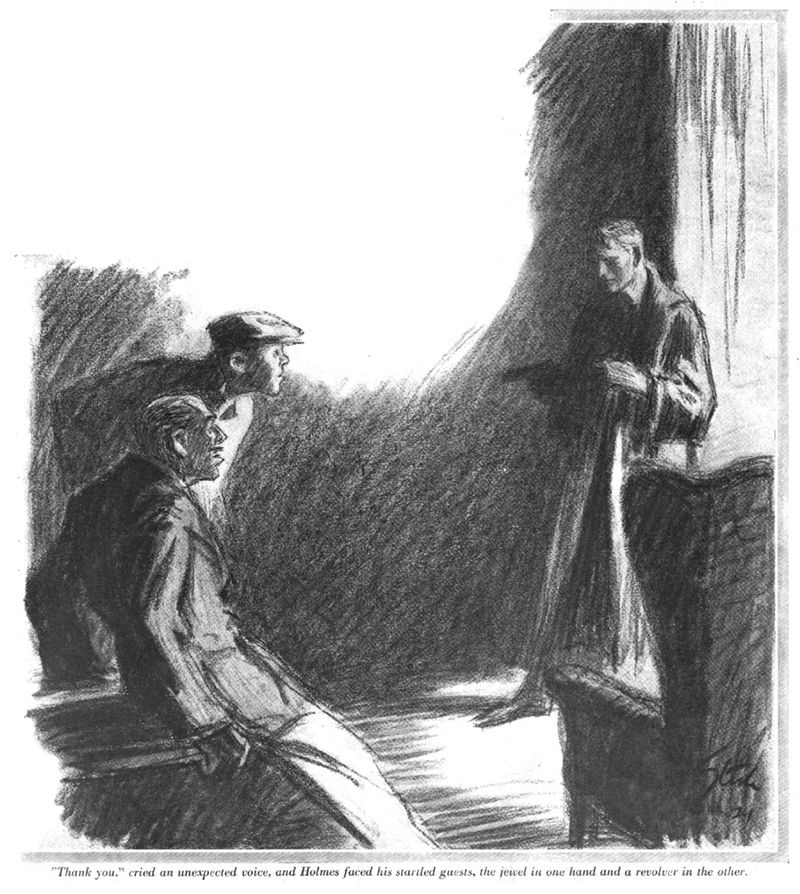
1921 illustration by Frederic Dorr Steele in Hearst's International.

Watson arrives in 221B Baker Street where the page boy Billy shows him a wax effigy of Holmes placed near a curtained window in the sitting room. The effigy produces a shadow on the curtain that, when viewed from outside, is the unmistakable profile of Sherlock Holmes. Using this visual trick, Holmes aims to give a perfect target to a would-be murderer with a rifle. Holmes names his murderer as Count Negretto Sylvius, the diamond thief he has been following in disguise. He gives the criminal's address to Watson, then sends the doctor out the back for the police. As the Count arrives, Holmes has Billy invite him inside, then takes him by surprise when he attempts an assault on the effigy. Holmes then offers the Count and his helper, boxer Sam Merton, freedom if they give up the jewel, or jail if not.

He invites them to discuss the deal while he plays violin in the next room. When the Count decides to double-cross Holmes and takes the stone from his secret pocket to show Sam in window light, the detective springs from the chair in place of his replica and grabs the £100,000 (equivalent to £4,232,000 in 2025) jewel. His bedroom has a gramophone and secret passage to behind the curtain.

After the police take away the villains, Lord Cantlemere – described by Holmes as "the eminent peer who represents the very highest interests" – sweeps in. Unlike the Prime Minister and Home Secretary, he did not want Holmes. When tricked into insisting on arrest for whoever is found possessing the diamond, he finds the jewel in his pocket – where Holmes has placed it – and apologizes. Finally, Holmes can eat.

== Analysis ==
It is notable for being one of only two Arthur Conan Doyle Holmes stories, aside from a couple of humorous vignettes, to be written in third person. The other is "His Last Bow". "The Mazarin Stone" was written this way because it was adapted from a stage play, The Crown Diamond, in which Watson hardly appeared. Its adaptation from the theatre also explains why the action in this story is confined to one room. The plot twist in which Holmes reveals he had been listening to the two criminals as they spoke freely would also not have been possible using a first person narrative.

The Crown Diamond, subtitled An Evening with Sherlock Holmes, was first performed on 2 May 1921 at the Bristol Hippodrome, and was written before the short story, which was first published in October 1921. However, historians do not agree on when the play was written, with some believing it was penned in early 1921 while others believe it was written years earlier. In the original play, the villain was Holmes's enemy Colonel Sebastian Moran of "The Adventure of the Empty House" infamy, not Count Negretto Sylvius.

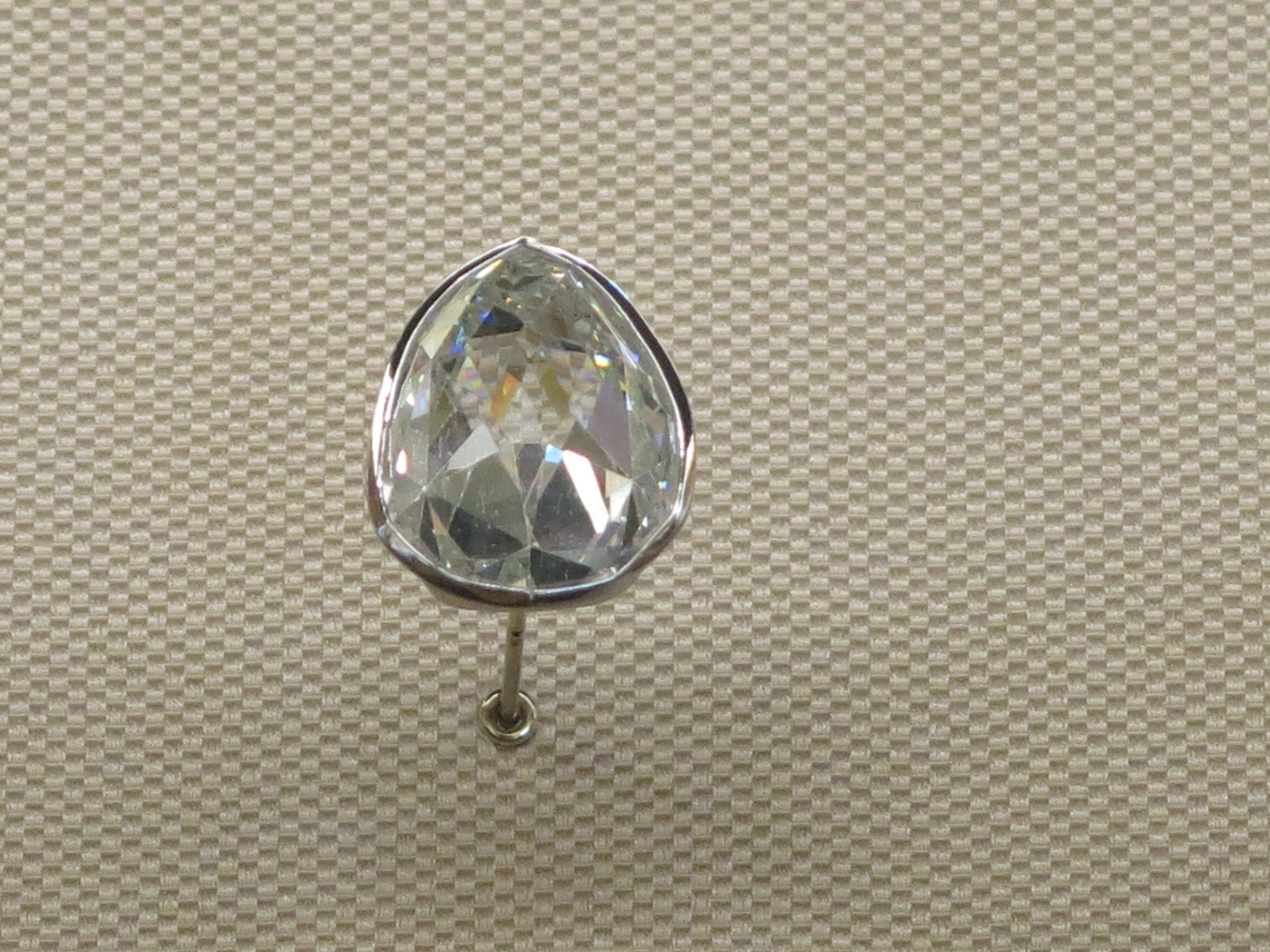
The Sancy diamond, one of the diamonds bequeathed by Cardinal Mazarin to Louis XIV.

According to Leslie S. Klinger, the name used to describe the "Mazarin stone" in the short story implies the stone once belonged to Cardinal Jules Mazarin, who, upon his death in 1661, bequeathed to the French monarch a collection of eighteen diamonds thereafter called the "Mazarin Diamonds". The name "Mazarin" is not mentioned in the original play, though the stone is described as a yellow Crown diamond in both the play and the short story.

== Publication history ==
"The Adventure of the Mazarin Stone" was published in the UK in The Strand Magazine in October 1921, and in the US in Hearst's International in November 1921. The story was published with three illustrations by Alfred Gilbert in the Strand, and with four illustrations by Frederic Dorr Steele in Hearst's International. It was included in the short story collection The Case-Book of Sherlock Holmes, which was published in the UK and the US in June 1927.

== Adaptations ==
=== Film and television ===
A short silent film based on the story was released in 1923 as part of the Sherlock Holmes film series by Stoll Pictures, with Eille Norwood as Holmes and Hubert Willis as Watson.

An episode of BBC's For the Children adapted the story for television in 1951. Featuring Andrew Osborn as Holmes and Philip King as Watson, no footage is believed to have survived.

This story was heavily rewritten for Granada Television's Sherlock Holmes series. In 1994, it was merged with another story, "The Adventure of the Three Garridebs". The most noticeable change is that Holmes does not feature except in the prologue and final scene (actor Jeremy Brett was away due to illness). It is Mycroft Holmes (Charles Gray) who takes up the case of the stolen diamond, while Watson is retained to look into the Garrideb mystery.

"The Adventure of the Mazarin Stone" was adapted as "The Adventure of the Mazarin Chip" for a 2001 episode of the animated television show Sherlock Holmes in the 22nd Century.

=== Audio ===
"The Adventure of the Mazarin Stone" was adapted by Edith Meiser as an episode of the American radio series The Adventures of Sherlock Holmes. The episode aired on 9 February 1931, with Richard Gordon as Sherlock Holmes and Leigh Lovell as Dr. Watson. Another dramatisation of the story adapted by Meiser aired on 23 May 1936 (with Gordon as Holmes and Harry West as Watson).

Meiser also adapted the story as episodes of the American radio series The New Adventures of Sherlock Holmes that aired on 5 January 1941 (with Basil Rathbone as Holmes and Nigel Bruce as Watson) and 4 January 1948 (with John Stanley as Holmes and Alfred Shirley as Watson).

Two BBC radio adaptations of the story aired as part of the 1952–1969 radio series starring Carleton Hobbs as Sherlock Holmes and Norman Shelley as Dr. Watson. The first aired on 2 December 1954 on the BBC Home Service and was dramatised by Felix Felton, with Ralph Truman as Count Negretto Sylvius. The second aired on 4 September 1962 on the BBC Light Programme, and was dramatised by Michael Hardwick, with Francis de Wolff as Count Sylvius.

"The Mazarin Stone" was dramatised for BBC Radio 4 in 1994 by Bert Coules as part of the 1989–1998 radio series starring Clive Merrison as Holmes and Michael Williams as Watson. It featured Anthony Bate as Lord Cantlemere and Nigel Anthony as Count Sylvius.

In 2006, the story was adapted for radio as part of The Classic Adventures of Sherlock Holmes, a series on the American radio show Imagination Theatre, with John Patrick Lowrie as Holmes and Lawrence Albert as Watson.

In 2025, the podcast Sherlock & Co. adapted the story in a three-episode adventure called "The Mazarin Stone", starring Harry Attwell as Sherlock Holmes, Paul Waggott as Dr. John Watson and Marta da Silva as Mariana "Mrs. Hudson" Ametxazurra. George Greenland voices Greg Cantlemere. Here the Mazarin stone is reimagined as an elusive prop from a sci-fi film Cantelmere is obsessed with.

== Sources ==
- Cawthorne, Nigel (2011). A Brief History of Sherlock Holmes. Running Press. ISBN 978-0762444083.
- Dickerson, Ian (2019). Sherlock Holmes and His Adventures on American Radio. BearManor Media. ISBN 978-1629335087.
- Smith, Daniel (2014) [2009]. The Sherlock Holmes Companion: An Elementary Guide (Updated ed.). Aurum Press. ISBN 978-1-78131-404-3.
