= The Adventure of the Three Students =

1904 short story by Arthur Conan Doyle

- Short story by Arthur Conan Doyle
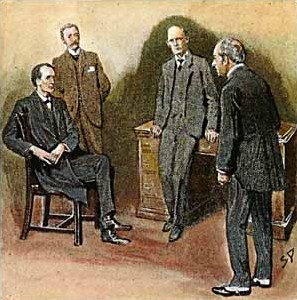
- Holmes, Watson, Soames and Bannister, 1904 illustration by Sidney Paget

Text available at Wikisource
- Country: United Kingdom
- Language: English
- Genre: Detective fiction short stories

Publication
- Published in: Strand Magazine
- Publication date: June 1904

Chronology
- Series: The Return of Sherlock Holmes
The Adventure of the Six Napoleons	The Adventure of the Golden Pince-Nez

"The Adventure of the Three Students", one of the 56 Sherlock Holmes short stories written by Sir Arthur Conan Doyle, is one of 13 stories in the cycle collected as The Return of Sherlock Holmes (1905). It was first published in The Strand Magazine in the United Kingdom in June 1904, and was also published in Collier's in the United States on 24 September 1904.

== Plot ==
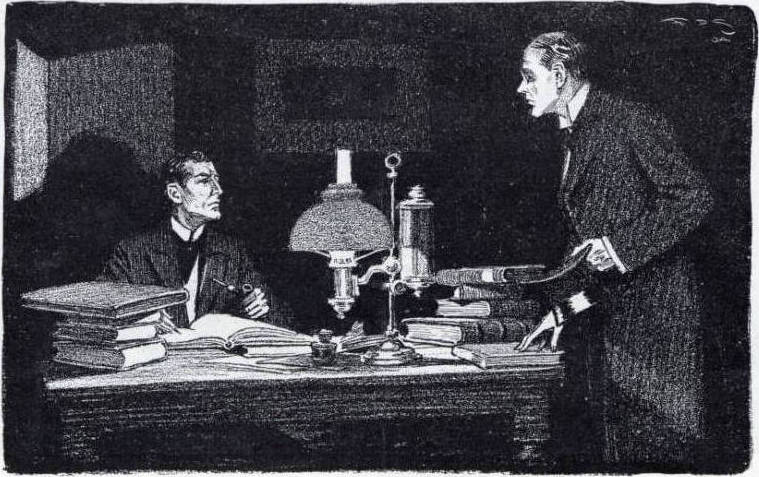
Holmes is approached by Hilton Soames, 1904 illustration by Frederic Dorr Steele in Collier's

Sherlock Holmes and Dr. Watson find themselves in a university town when a tutor and lecturer of St Luke's College, Mr. Hilton Soames, brings him an interesting problem. Soames had been reviewing the galley proofs of an exam he was going to give when he left his office for an hour. When he returned, he found that his servant, Bannister, had entered the room but accidentally left his key in the lock when he left, and someone had disturbed the exam papers on his desk and left traces that show it had been partially copied. Bannister is devastated and collapses on a chair, but swears that he did not touch the papers. Soames found other clues in his office: pencil shavings, a broken pencil lead, a fresh cut in his desk surface, and a small blob of black clay speckled with sawdust.

Soames wants to uncover the cheater and prevent him from taking the exam, since it is for a sizeable scholarship. Three students who will take the exam live above him in the same building. The first, Gilchrist, is athletic, being a hurdler and a long-jumper, and industrious (in contrast to his father who squandered his fortune in horse racing); the second, Daulat Ras, is described as quiet and methodical; the third is Miles McLaren, a gifted man but thoroughly dissolute and given to gambling.

Holmes examines the office. The cheater obviously took the papers over to the window one by one while he copied them so that he could see Soames returning, but as it happens, Soames did not come back the usual way. A nearby door leads to Soames's bedroom. Upon examining that, Holmes finds another, similar, sawdust-speckled blob of clay. He stuns Soames by telling him that the cheater, upon hearing his approach, hid in Soames's bedroom. He was there, hiding behind a curtain, all the time that Soames was questioning Bannister.

The next morning, Holmes and Watson return to Soames's office. Holmes confronts Bannister, accusing him of withholding information. Bannister will not own up to anything, and insists that there was no one in Soames's office while he was there. Holmes, however, sends for Gilchrist, and proceeds to lay out his results.

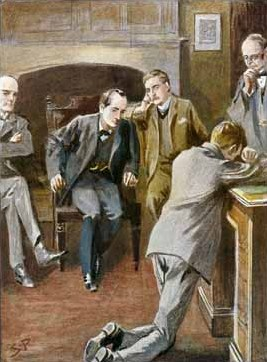
Gilchrist, confronted by Holmes, breaks down, 1904 illustration by Sidney Paget

The cheater was someone who knew the exam proofs were there. This could only be Gilchrist, because the proofs' whereabouts had been kept secret, and Gilchrist was the only one tall enough to look in through Soames's window to see his desk. Holmes has also identified the blobs as the special clay found in the long-jump pit, further implicating Gilchrist. Gilchrist reveals his guilt by reproaching Bannister for his apparent treachery. Bannister was indeed the one who covered for Gilchrist. He felt that he had to, for old times' sake: Bannister was once Gilchrist's father's butler.

Holmes then explains the remaining clues. The scratch on the desk was caused by Gilchrist's spiked jumping shoes as he grabbed them in his haste, and the clay blobs fell from his shoes. Bannister had collapsed in the chair to hide Gilchrist's gloves, which he saw had been left on the chair. For his part, Gilchrist credits Bannister with convincing him not to profit from his misdeed, and presents Soames with a letter stating his wish not to sit the exam, but to instead accept an offer to work for the Rhodesian Police.

== Publication history ==
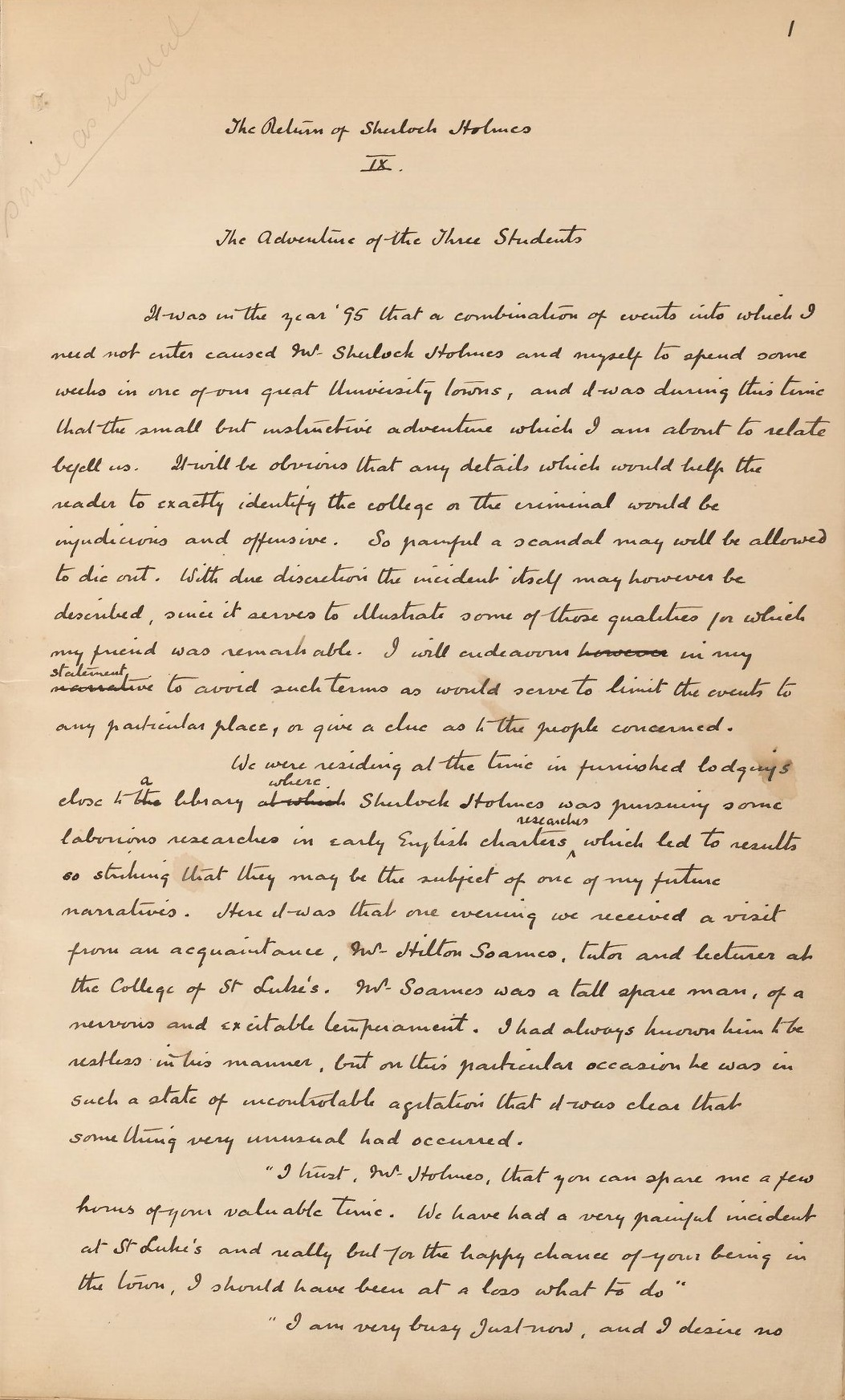
First page of the original manuscript for "The Adventure of the Three Students" by Arthur Conan Doyle

"The Adventure of the Three Students" was published in the UK in The Strand Magazine in June 1904, and in the US in Collier's on 24 September 1904. The story was published with seven illustrations by Sidney Paget in the Strand, and with nine illustrations by Frederic Dorr Steele in Collier's. It was included in the short story collection The Return of Sherlock Holmes, which was published in the US in February 1905 and in the UK in March 1905.

== Adaptations ==
=== Film ===
A silent short film adapted from the story was released in 1923 as part of the Stoll film series starring Eille Norwood as Sherlock Holmes and Hubert Willis as Watson, with William Lugg as Hilton Soames and A. Harding Steerman as Bannister.

=== Literature ===
While the tale is not directly adapted, the novel The Thinking Engine by James Lovegrove is set around the time of these events, explaining that Holmes and Watson were in the unnamed university town mentioned here to compete against the titular Thinking Engine, which is essentially an apparent early computer capable of matching or even surpassing Holmes' deductive abilities. After Holmes has "competed" against the Engine to solve various other cases- and reference is made to him and Watson dealing with the events of "Three Students" during a lull in their efforts- the novel concludes with the discovery that the "Thinking Engine" is actually a hollow construct with the still-living but crippled Professor Moriarty inside it.

=== Television ===
While the modern-set series Elementary did not feature a direct adaptation of this storyline, the episode "On the Scent" opened with Sherlock Holmes and Joan Watson attempting a VR recreation of a man jumping into a window to determine whether student Jonas Gilchrist broke into his professor's room to cheat on an exam, a clear reference to a version of the events of this case.

=== Radio and audio dramas ===
A radio adaptation of "The Adventure of the Three Students", dramatised by Edith Meiser, aired on 2 November 1931 in the American radio series The Adventures of Sherlock Holmes, starring Richard Gordon as Sherlock Holmes and Leigh Lovell as Dr. Watson.

Meiser also adapted the story as an episode of the American radio series The New Adventures of Sherlock Holmes, with Basil Rathbone as Holmes and Nigel Bruce as Watson, that aired on 24 November 1940.

Felix Felton dramatised the story as a radio adaptation for the BBC Home Service as part of the 1952–1969 radio series starring Carleton Hobbs as Holmes and Norman Shelley as Watson, with Felton playing Hilton Soames. The adaptation aired in November 1957.

"The Three Students" was dramatised for BBC Radio 4 in 1993 by Denys Hawthorne (who also played Hilton Soames) as part of the 1989–1998 radio series starring Clive Merrison as Holmes and Michael Williams as Watson, with Desmond Llewelyn as Bannister.

The story was adapted as the second episode of The Classic Adventures of Sherlock Holmes, a series on the American radio show Imagination Theatre, starring John Patrick Lowrie as Holmes and Lawrence Albert as Watson. The episode aired in 2006.

In 2024, the podcast Sherlock & Co. adapted the story in a two-episode adventure called "The Three Students", starring Harry Attwell as Holmes and Paul Waggott as Watson.
