= Leslie Armstrong =

Leslie Armstrong may refer to:

- Dr Leslie Armstrong, a fictional character in The Adventure of the Missing Three-Quarter, a Sherlock Holmes story
- Dr Leslie Armstrong, archaeologist who excavated at Grimes Graves
- Dr Leslie Armstrong (died 2007), therapist who appeared on Howard 100 and Howard 101
