= The Adventure of the Missing Three-Quarter =

1904 short story by Arthur Conan Doyle

- Short story by Arthur Conan Doyle
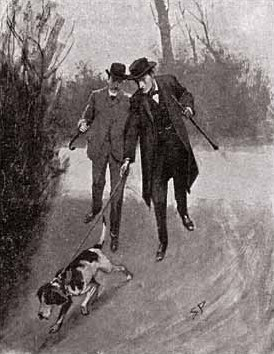
- Holmes and Watson use a scent-hound to find the missing man, 1904 illustration by Sidney Paget

Text available at Wikisource
- Country: United Kingdom
- Language: English
- Genre: Detective fiction short stories

Publication
- Published in: Strand Magazine
- Publication date: August 1904

Chronology
- Series: The Return of Sherlock Holmes
| The Adventure of the Golden Pince-Nez | The Adventure of the Abbey Grange |

"The Adventure of the Missing Three-Quarter", one of the 56 Sherlock Holmes short stories written by Sir Arthur Conan Doyle, is one of 13 stories in the cycle collected as The Return of Sherlock Holmes (1905). It was originally published in The Strand Magazine in the United Kingdom in August 1904, and was also published in Collier's in the United States on 26 November 1904.

== Plot ==
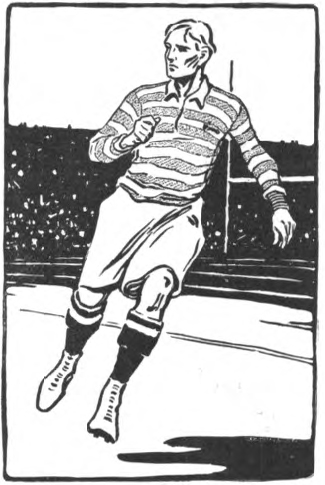
The missing three-quarter, 1904 illustration by Frederic Dorr Steele in Collier's

Mr. Cyril Overton of Trinity College, Cambridge, comes to Sherlock Holmes seeking his help in Godfrey Staunton's disappearance. Staunton is the star player on Overton's rugby union team (who plays at the three-quarters position, hence the story's title) and they will likely lose an important match the following day against Oxford if Staunton cannot be found. Holmes has to admit that amateur sport is outside his field of expertise, but he shows the same care he has shown to his other cases.

Staunton had seemed a bit pale and bothered earlier in the day. Later in the evening, according to a hotel porter, a rough-looking, bearded man came to the hotel with a note for Staunton; judging from the young man's reaction, the note contained rather devastating news. He immediately left the hotel with the bearded stranger; the two of them were last seen running in the direction of the Strand at about half past ten. No one has seen them since.

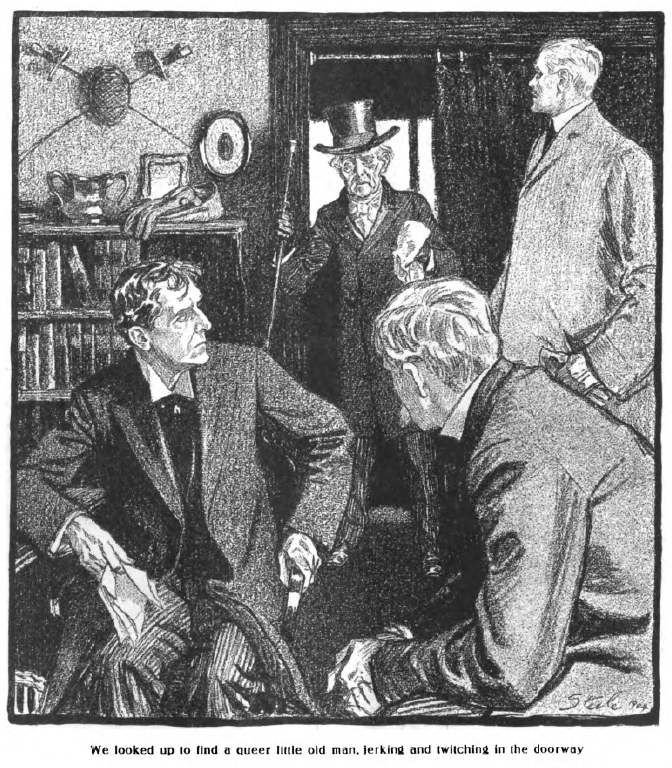
Holmes and Watson (foreground), and Lord Mount-James and Overton (background), 1904 illustration by Frederic Dorr Steele

Overton has wired to Cambridge, but Staunton has not been seen there. He has also wired Lord Mount-James, Staunton's very wealthy uncle and nearest living relative, but has heard no answer. Staunton is the almost-eighty-year-old Lord Mount-James's heir, but he must meanwhile live in relative poverty owing to his uncle's miserly behaviour.

Holmes further questions the porter. The bearded man who brought the note was neither a gentleman nor a workman, and he seemed to be bothered by something too, for his hand was trembling as he handed the porter the note to give to Staunton. The only word that the porter overheard of their short conversation was "time". Earlier in the evening, at six o'clock, the porter had brought Staunton a telegram, and saw Staunton write a reply. Staunton told the porter that he would send it himself. Holmes looks at the telegraph forms in Staunton's room, and then at the blotter, finally finding a clue. The impression on the blotter yields a part of the message that Staunton sent: "Stand by us for God's sake". Obviously at least one other person is involved ("us"), and there is some kind of danger.

Lord Mount-James briefly visits, but can give Holmes no useful information as to his nephew's whereabouts. The old miser seems utterly aghast at the possibility that it might be a kidnapping whose object would be to extort his wealth. Holmes and Watson then go to the telegraph office, where Holmes uses a ruse to get the woman there to show him the counterfoil of the message that Staunton sent. It was addressed to Dr. Leslie Armstrong, a medical academic at Cambridge.

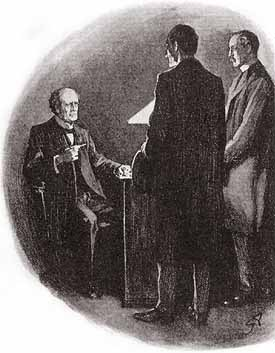
Dr. Armstrong is visited by Holmes, 1904 illustration by Sidney Paget

Holmes and Watson go to see Armstrong, who tells them that Staunton is an intimate friend of his. He does not react when told that Staunton has disappeared, and claims not to know where he is, and not to have seen him recently. However, when Holmes produces a bill for services issued by Armstrong to Staunton, Armstrong furiously refuses to answer any more questions, denies that he had the telegram from Staunton, and has his butler show Holmes and Watson out. Holmes deduces that Armstrong must know where Staunton is, and lodges at an inn just across the street from Armstrong's office to keep watch.

Holmes learns that Armstrong, although not in actual medical practice, regularly rides in his brougham out into the country somewhere. The round trip seems to take about three hours. Holmes tries following the brougham on one of its outings, but is thwarted by Dr. Armstrong, who makes it quite clear that he is aware that Holmes is following him. The next day, Holmes's inquiries in all the local villages come to naught; no one has seen the doctor's brougham passing through.

The mystery is at last unlocked by Pompey, a beagle-foxhound cross. After Holmes covertly sprays aniseed oil onto the wheels of the doctor's brougham, Pompey tracks it to a cottage in the countryside. What Holmes finds there is not pleasant. Staunton is there, but is grieving over his young wife, who has just died of consumption. Her existence was kept secret, because Lord Mount-James would not have approved of the marriage and would have disowned his nephew. Armstrong had told the woman's father about her condition, and he, the bearded stranger, had unwisely told Staunton, who felt compelled to rush off forthwith.

Holmes tells Armstrong that as long as there is no foul play involved, private affairs are not his business. He and Watson then depart, leaving Staunton to his grief.

== Publication history ==
"The Adventure of the Missing Three-Quarter" was published in the UK in The Strand Magazine in August 1904, and in the US in Collier's on 26 November 1904. The story was published with seven illustrations by Sidney Paget in the Strand, and with seven illustrations by Frederic Dorr Steele in Collier's. It was included in the short story collection The Return of Sherlock Holmes, which was published in the US in February 1905 and in the UK in March 1905.

== Adaptations ==
=== Film ===
A short silent film adapted from the story was released in 1923 as part of the Stoll film series starring Eille Norwood as Sherlock Holmes and Hubert Willis as Dr Watson.

=== Audio ===
A radio adaptation aired as an episode of the American radio series The Adventures of Sherlock Holmes. The episode was adapted by Edith Meiser and aired on 8 June 1931, with Richard Gordon as Sherlock Holmes and Leigh Lovell as Dr. Watson. Another production in the same series based on the story was broadcast in 1932.

Meiser also adapted the story as an episode of the American radio series The New Adventures of Sherlock Holmes, with Basil Rathbone as Holmes and Nigel Bruce as Watson, that aired on 29 December 1940.

"The Missing Three-Quarter" was adapted by Felix Felton as a 1955 radio production for the BBC Home Service, as part of the 1952–1969 radio series starring Carleton Hobbs as Holmes and Norman Shelley as Watson, with Felton as Lord Mount-James and Ronald Simpson as Dr Leslie Armstrong. Hobbs and Shelley also played Holmes and Watson respectively in an adaptation of the story that aired on the BBC Light Programme in 1962, which was adapted by Michael Hardwick.

In 1993 it was dramatised for BBC Radio 4 by Roger Danes as part of the 1989–1998 radio series starring Clive Merrison as Holmes and Michael Williams as Watson, featuring Peter Jeffrey as Dr Armstrong and Peter Howell as Lord Mount-James.

The story was adapted as a 2013 episode of The Classic Adventures of Sherlock Holmes, a series on the American radio show Imagination Theatre, starring John Patrick Lowrie as Holmes and Lawrence Albert as Watson.

In 2025, the podcast Sherlock & Co. adapted the story in a three-episode adventure called "The Missing Three-Quarter", starring Harry Attwell as Sherlock Holmes, Paul Waggott as Dr. John Watson and Marta da Silva as Mariana "Mrs. Hudson" Ametxazurra. Gary Lineker and Alan Shearer feature as themselves. Lineker is also a founder of Sherlock & Co's production company, Goalhanger Podcast. Tom Holland from Goalhanger podcast, The Rest is History, plays Dr. Armstrong.
