= The Adventure of the Second Stain =

1904 short story by Arthur Conan Doyle

- Short story by Arthur Conan Doyle
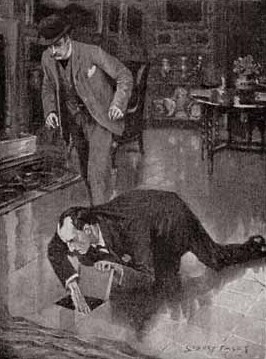
- Holmes finds the hiding place in the floor, 1904 illustration by Sidney Paget

Text available at Wikisource
- Country: United Kingdom
- Language: English
- Genre: Detective fiction short stories

Publication
- Published in: Strand Magazine
- Publication date: December 1904

Chronology
- Series: The Return of Sherlock Holmes
The Adventure of the Abbey Grange	The Valley of Fear

"The Adventure of the Second Stain", one of the 56 Sherlock Holmes short stories written by Sir Arthur Conan Doyle, is one of 13 stories in the cycle collected as The Return of Sherlock Holmes (1905) and the only unrecorded case mentioned passively by Watson to be written. It was first published in The Strand Magazine in the United Kingdom in December 1904, and was also published in Collier's in the United States on 28 January 1905.

== Plot ==
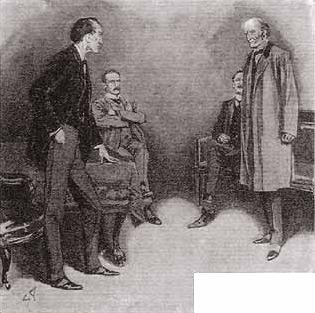
The Prime Minister and the Secretary of State for European Affairs consult Holmes, 1904 illustration by Sidney Paget

Lord Bellinger, the Prime Minister, and the Right Honourable Trelawney Hope, the Secretary of State for European Affairs, come to Holmes in the matter of a document stolen from Hope's dispatch box, which he kept at home in Whitehall Terrace when not at work. If divulged, this document could bring about very dire consequences for all of Europe, even war. They are loath to tell Holmes at first the exact nature of the document's contents, but when Holmes declines to take on their case, they tell him it was a rather injudicious letter from a foreign potentate. It disappeared from the dispatch box one evening when Hope's wife was out at the theatre for four hours. No one in the house knew about the document, not even the Secretary's wife. None of the servants could have guessed what was in the box.

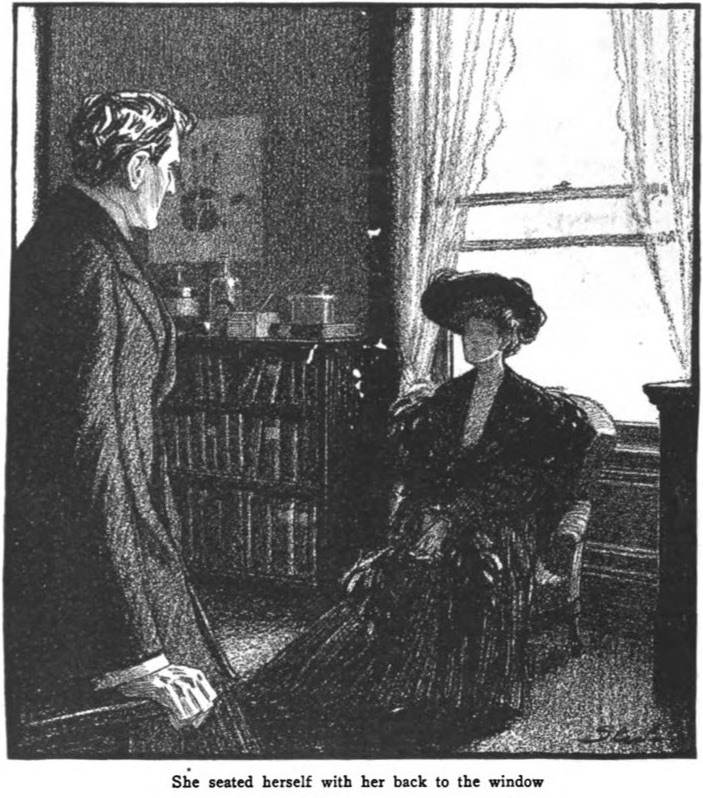
Holmes is visited by Lady Hilda Trelawney Hope, 1905 illustration by Frederic Dorr Steele in Collier's

Holmes decides to begin with some spies known to him and is then astonished to hear from Dr. Watson that one of those that he names, Eduardo Lucas, has been murdered. Before Holmes has a chance to act, Lady Hilda Trelawney Hope, the European Secretary's wife, arrives unexpectedly at 221B Baker Street. She asks Holmes insistently about the stolen document's contents, but Holmes only reveals there would be regrettable consequences if the document were not found. Lady Hilda also begs Holmes to tell her husband nothing of her visit.

Holmes's spy hunt does not go well. Four days after the murder, French police arrest the probable murderer of Lucas: Madame Fournier, whom Lucas married in Paris under an alias. She was seen in London near Lucas's house the night of the crime, but she is now useless as a witness because she has gone insane.

Inspector Lestrade calls Holmes to the murder scene to examine something odd. Lucas bled over a drugget, and the blood soaked through it, but curiously there is no bloodstain on the floor under the drugget. However, there is one under the opposite edge of the carpet. It can only mean that the constable guarding the crime scene has been foolish enough to let someone in and leave them alone while they moved things in the room, including the carpet. Holmes tells Lestrade to take the constable to a back room and obtain a confession, which he does vigorously. Meanwhile, Holmes pulls the unfastened carpet aside and quickly finds a hiding place in the floor, but it is empty. The errant constable tells Holmes that the unauthorised visitor was a young woman. She apparently fainted at the sight of the blood but had left while the constable went out to fetch some brandy to revive her. As Holmes is leaving Lucas's house, he shows the constable a photograph, and he recognises it as the visitor.

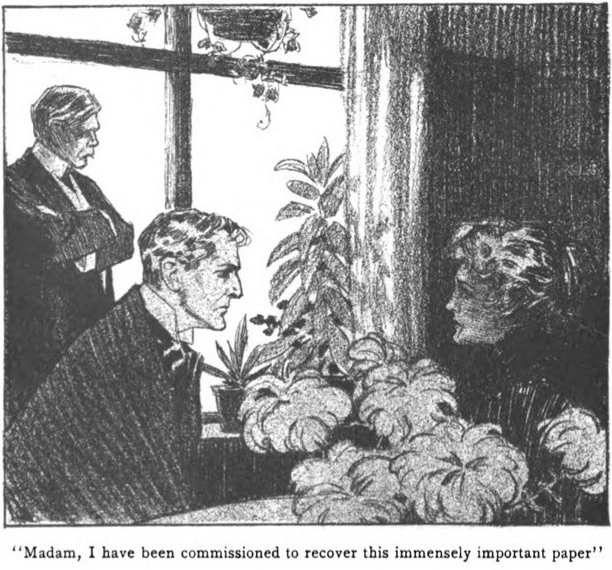
Holmes confronts Lady Hilda, 1905 illustration by Frederic Dorr Steele

Holmes goes to the Hope household and confronts Lady Hilda, accusing her of the theft. At first, she denies everything, but is forced to admit her wrongdoing under the threat of certain scandal. Lady Hilda admits Lucas was blackmailing her with a compromising letter written by her years earlier, and demanded the document as payment (an unnamed spy had made Lucas aware of the document). Lady Hilda went to Lucas's house to do the business when, as it happened, his wife from Paris showed up and confronted him about his affair, believing Lady Hilda was his mistress. Lady Hilda hurriedly left, albeit not before seeing Lucas place the document under the drugget. She returned to fetch the document after her visit to Holmes convinced her she needed to do so. She hands the document to Holmes. At Holmes's suggestion, the document is put back in the dispatch box using Lady Hilda's duplicate key.

When Hope arrives back home with the Prime Minister, Holmes pretends to believe that the evidence has convinced him that the document must still be in the box, shuffled between other papers. It is soon found, and Hope rejoices that it was apparently only a mistake. The Prime Minister suspects Holmes knows more than he is telling, but Holmes simply responds, "We also have our diplomatic secrets."

== Background ==
This case was first mentioned in "The Adventure of the Naval Treaty". In "The Naval Treaty", Watson says that this case has "interest of such importance and implicates so many of the first families in the kingdom that for many years it will be impossible to make it public." On the other hand, Watson also refers there to "Monsieur Dubuque of the Paris police, and Fritz von Waldbaum, the well-known specialist of Dantzig, both of whom had wasted their energies upon what proved to be side-issues" who do not appear in the published version of the story. In My Dear Holmes, a biography of Holmes by Gavin Brend, Brend hypothesises that their mention suggests there could be another adventure featuring a "second stain".

Some scholars have speculated that the "foreign potentate" who wrote the missing letter was Kaiser Wilhelm II of Germany, whose foreign policy was controversial in Britain.

A reference in this same story makes it clear that "The Adventure of the Second Stain" is set in July 1888, in the middle of summer, whereas Watson says in the published version of "The Second Stain" that the case happened in autumn.

Watson states that, due to Holmes's retirement, the detective has been trying to avoid publicity, and only allowed Watson to publish the story because the doctor had "promised" to in "The Adventure of the Naval Treaty."

A spy called Oberstein appears both in this story and in "The Adventure of the Bruce-Partington Plans" (again listed as one of the three most prominent agents in London), set seven years later.

== Publication history ==
"The Adventure of the Second Stain" was first published in the UK in The Strand Magazine in December 1904, and in the US in Collier's on 28 January 1905. The story was published with eight illustrations by Sidney Paget in the Strand, and with six illustrations by Frederic Dorr Steele in Collier's. It was included in the short story collection The Return of Sherlock Holmes, which was published in the US in February 1905 and in the UK in March 1905.

In Collier's, the story was presented as "the last Sherlock Holmes story ever to be written by A. Conan Doyle". This would prove to be incorrect since the story preceded later Sherlock Holmes stories collected in His Last Bow and The Case-Book of Sherlock Holmes, as well as the novel The Valley of Fear.

== Adaptations ==
=== Film and television ===
A short silent film adapted from the story was released in 1922 as part of the Stoll film series starring Eille Norwood as Sherlock Holmes and Hubert Willis as Watson, and featuring Dorothy Fane as Lady Hope and Wallace Bosco as Eduardo Lucas. Teddy Arundell played Inspector Hopkins in this short film and other films in the series.

The story was adapted for a 1951 TV episode of Sherlock Holmes, starring Alan Wheatley as Holmes.

The story was adapted for the 1968 BBC series with Peter Cushing. The episode is now lost.

The story was adapted in the Granada Television series The Return of Sherlock Holmes, starring Jeremy Brett, in 1986. The adaptation contains a chronological error as Holmes is seen skipping past the Clive of India Memorial in King Charles Street, London. Only erected in 1912, it did not exist at the time the episode is set (1888).

The story was also adapted in the Soviet TV film The Twentieth Century Approaches (1986), the last television film in the series The Adventures of Sherlock Holmes and Dr. Watson.

An episode of the animated television series Sherlock Holmes in the 22nd Century was based on the story. The episode, titled "The Adventure of the Second Stain", aired in 2001.

=== Audio ===
A radio adaptation aired as an episode of the American radio series The Adventures of Sherlock Holmes. The episode was adapted by Edith Meiser and aired on 23 June 1932, with Richard Gordon as Sherlock Holmes and Leigh Lovell as Dr. Watson.

Meiser also adapted the story as an episode of the American radio series The New Adventures of Sherlock Holmes, with Basil Rathbone as Holmes and Nigel Bruce as Watson, that aired on 29 January 1940. Another episode in the same series adapted from the story aired on 4 January 1942.

John Gielgud played Holmes and Ralph Richardson played Watson in a radio adaptation of the story that aired on the BBC Light Programme in November 1954. It also featured Raf De La Torre as Lord Bellinger and John Cazabon as Lestrade. The production aired in January 1955 on NBC radio.

Michael Hardwick dramatised the story as a radio adaptation for the BBC Home Service, as part of the 1952–1969 radio series starring Carleton Hobbs as Holmes and Norman Shelley as Watson, with Simon Lack as Trelawney Hope and Barbara Mitchell as Mrs Hudson. The adaptation aired in 1967.

"The Second Stain" was dramatised for BBC Radio 4 in 1993 by Bert Coules as part of the 1989–1998 radio series starring Clive Merrison as Holmes and Michael Williams as Watson. It featured Jeremy Clyde as Trelawney Hope and Sabina Franklyn as Lady Hilda.

The story was adapted as a 2013 episode of The Classic Adventures of Sherlock Holmes, a series on the American radio show Imagination Theatre, starring John Patrick Lowrie as Holmes and Lawrence Albert as Watson.

In 2025, the podcast Sherlock & Co. adapted the story in a two-episode adventure called "The Second Stain", starring Harry Attwell as Sherlock Holmes, Paul Waggott as Dr. John Watson and Marta da Silva as Mariana "Mrs. Hudson" Ametxazurra. The roles of the Hope family are gender swapped with Kasmine Kerr as Tabitha Hope, and Joshua Manning as Hildon Hope.
