= The Adventure of the Golden Pince-Nez =

- Short story by Arthur Conan Doyle
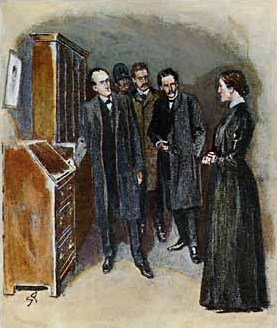
- Holmes asking about a mark on the bureau, 1904 illustration by Sidney Paget

Text available at Wikisource
- Country: United Kingdom
- Language: English
- Genre: Detective fiction short stories

Publication
- Published in: Strand Magazine
- Publication date: July 1904

Chronology
- Series: The Return of Sherlock Holmes
The Adventure of the Three Students	The Adventure of the Missing Three-Quarter

"The Adventure of the Golden Pince-Nez", one of the 56 Sherlock Holmes short stories written by Sir Arthur Conan Doyle, is one of 13 stories in the cycle collected as The Return of Sherlock Holmes (1905). It was first published in The Strand Magazine in the United Kingdom in July 1904, and was also published in Collier's in the United States in October 1904.

== Plot ==
One wretched November night, Inspector Stanley Hopkins visits Holmes at 221B Baker Street to discuss the violent death of Willoughby Smith, secretary to aged invalid Professor Coram. Coram had dismissed his previous two secretaries. The murder happened at Yoxley Old Place near Chatham, Kent, the fatal weapon being a sealing-wax knife belonging to the professor. Hopkins can identify no motive for the killing, with Smith having no enemies or trouble in his past. Smith was found by Coram's maid, who recounts his last words as "The professor; it was she."

The maid further told Hopkins that before the murder, she heard Smith leave his room and walk down to the study; she had been hanging curtains and did not see him, only recognising his brisk step. The professor was in bed at the time. A minute later, a hoarse scream issued from the study, and the maid, hesitating briefly, entered and found the murder. She later tells Holmes that Smith went out for a walk not long before the murder.

The murderer's only likely means of entry was through the back door after walking along the path from the road, and Hopkins found some indistinct footmarks running beside the path, the murderer obviously seeking to leave no trail. Hopkins could not tell whether the track was coming or going, nor whether made by big or small feet.

The professor's study contained a bureau; nothing seemed to have been stolen. Its drawers were left open, as was normal, and the cupboard in the middle was locked. The professor kept the key.

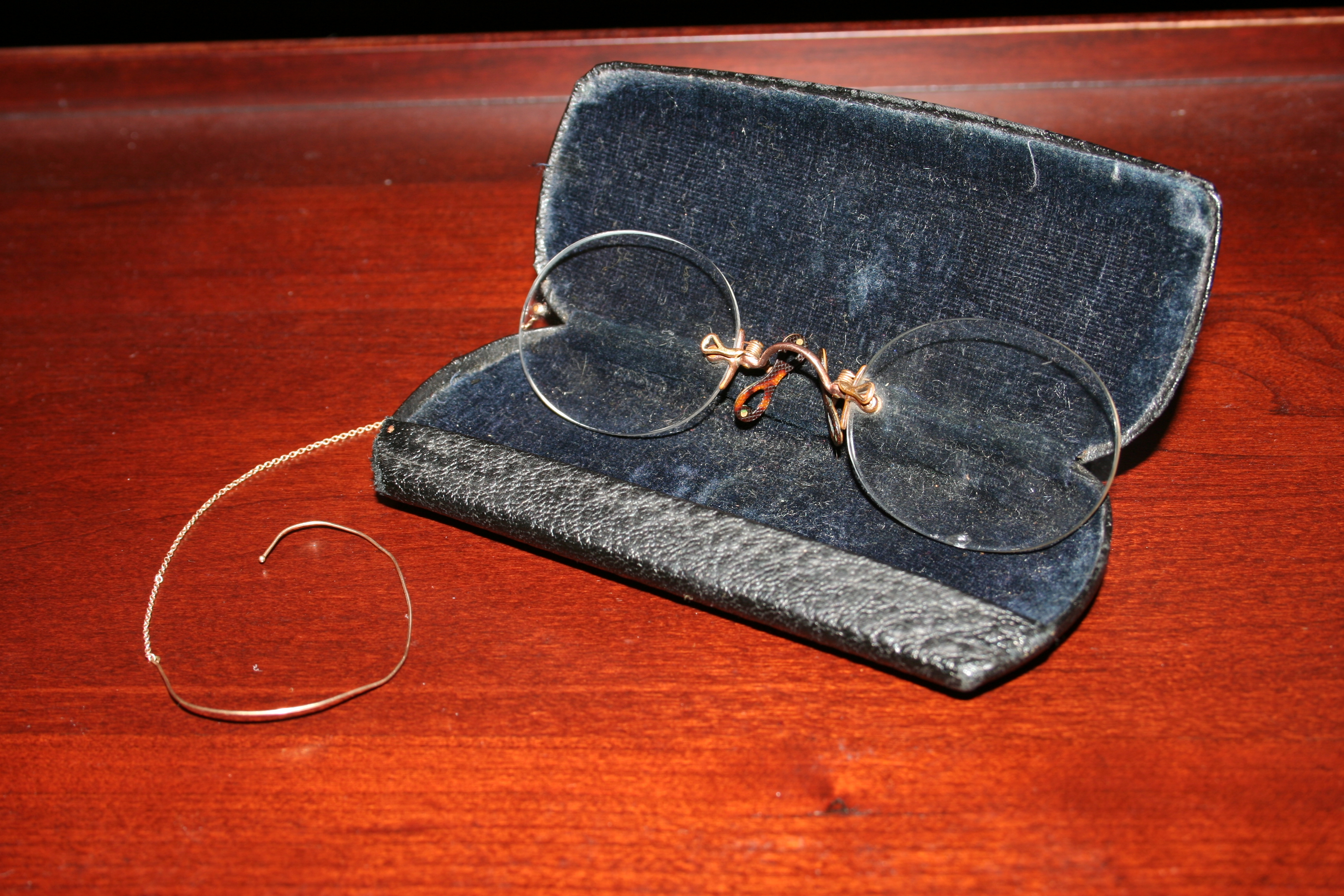
Hard bridge pince nez glasses with chain and ear hook.

A lone piece of evidence was found in Willoughby Smith's hand: a pair of golden pince-nez spectacles. Holmes examines these and from them alone deduces the following details of the murderer:

- It is a woman;
- She is of some good breeding;
- She dresses like a lady;
- She is a person of refinement and is well dressed;
- She has a thick nose;
- Her eyes are close together;
- She has a puckered forehead, a peering look, and likely rounded shoulders;
- She has been to an optician at least twice over the last few months.

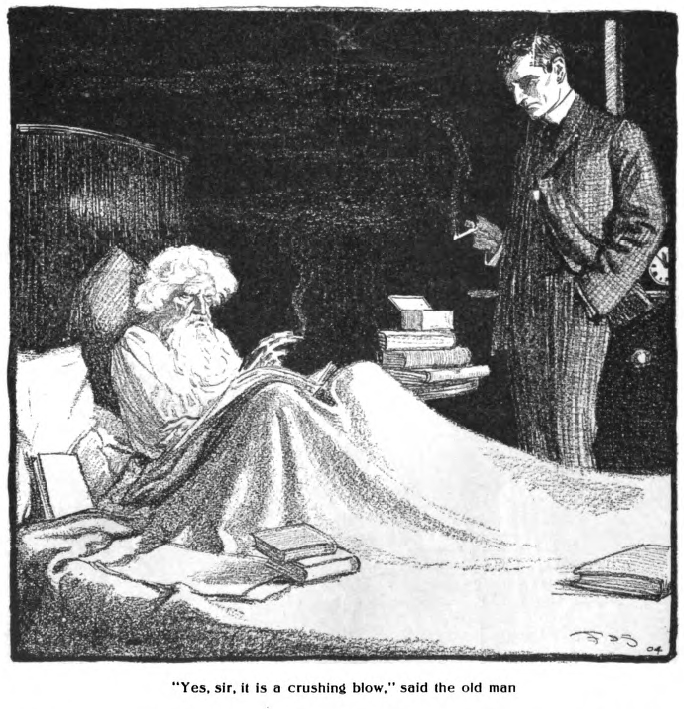
Holmes interviews the professor, 1904 illustration by Frederic Dorr Steele in Collier's

Holmes, Dr. Watson, and Hopkins head to Yoxley the next morning, and Holmes carefully examines the site. In the study, he notices a recent scratch on the bureau and reasons the murderer intended to access its contents. Smith was killed as his presence interfered with the burglary. No-one saw the murderer leave, nor did anyone hear a door opening. Holmes notes that both the corridors, the one leading from the back door and the one leading to the professor's bedroom, are about the same length and lined with coconut matting.

Holmes interviews the professor in his bedroom, smoking many Egyptian cigarettes and dropping the ashes all over the floor. The professor claims utter ignorance regarding the murder and ventures that Smith's death may be suicide. Holmes asks about the locked cupboard in the bureau. The professor hands over the key. Holmes inspects the key and returns it immediately, leaving the bureau sealed.

Watson asks Holmes if he has a clue, and Holmes tells him the cigarette ashes might reveal the truth. Holmes meets the housekeeper in the garden and has a seemingly unimportant conversation about the professor's eating habits; apparently, he has eaten heavily today. In the afternoon, the three men return to the professor in his room, and Holmes deliberately knocks the cigarettes over as an excuse to get a closer look at the floor. Holmes' suspicion is confirmed – there are footprints in the ash. At that moment, the murderer, appearing exactly as Holmes deduced, emerges from a hiding place in a bookcase.

The mystery's explanation is revealed as: the woman came in secret to the professor's house to obtain some documents, using a duplicate key she gained from one of the former secretaries. She was surprised by Smith, whom she attacked with the nearest object to hand, the sealing-wax knife; she had not intended to kill him. She lost her pince-nez in the scramble to escape; unable to see clearly, she turned along the wrong corridor and wound up in the professor's room. Although surprised, he hid her. The murderer is, in fact, the professor's estranged wife, Anna, and they are both Russian. Years prior, the pair had been involved with nihilists; she and a non-violent nihilist friend were both betrayed by the professor for gain. Having finished her jail sentence in Siberia, Anna came in search of evidence that would exonerate her friend.

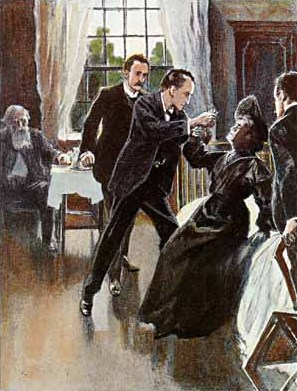
Anna committing suicide, 1904 illustration by Sidney Paget

Anna had met Smith while he was taking his walk, explaining Smith's last words. The professor's increased appetite is, of course, explained by his having to feed a second, hidden person. Shortly after the final revelations, Anna dies from poison she took while in hiding. Her last wish is to ask Holmes to deliver the documents to the Russian Embassy, which he duly fulfills.

== Publication history ==
"The Adventure of the Golden Pince-Nez" was published in the UK in The Strand Magazine in July 1904, and in the US in Collier's on 29 October 1904. The story was published with eight illustrations by Sidney Paget in the Strand, and with six illustrations by Frederic Dorr Steele in Collier's. It was included in the short story collection The Return of Sherlock Holmes, which was published in the US in February 1905 and in the UK in March 1905.

== Adaptations ==
=== Film and television ===
A short silent film adapted from the story, under the title The Golden Pince-Nez, was released in 1922 as part of the Stoll film series starring Eille Norwood as Sherlock Holmes and Hubert Willis as Watson, with Teddy Arundell as Inspector Hopkins, Norma Whalley as Anna Coram, and Cecil Morton York as Professor Coram. An extensively restored copy was scheduled to be shown during the 2024 BFI London Film Festival.

The television adaptation with Jeremy Brett, in the Granada TV television series Sherlock Holmes, differs slightly. A heavily bearded member of the Russian Brotherhood lurks in the garden, and administers final justice to the villainous Professor. Anna's key was her own original. Dr. Watson is replaced by Sherlock Holmes's brother, Mycroft Holmes, due to the unavailability of Edward Hardwicke for the episode and, instead of Sherlock Holmes dropping cigarette ash on the floor, Mycroft scatters snuff. During Holmes' brother's investigation at the crime scene with Inspector Hopkins, Sherlock Holmes mumbles about the irony that their father gave his magnifying glass to Mycroft who has always been depicted as lazy and lethargic. Also, Mycroft Holmes remarks that their father always told them, "eliminate the impossible, and whatever remains, however improbable, must be the truth". He then adds, "I forget his exact words, but those are near enough."

=== Audio ===
A radio adaptation of the story, dramatised by Edith Meiser, aired on 1 June 1931 in the American radio series The Adventures of Sherlock Holmes, starring Richard Gordon as Sherlock Holmes and Leigh Lovell as Dr. Watson.

Meiser also adapted the story as an episode of the American radio series The New Adventures of Sherlock Holmes, with Basil Rathbone as Holmes and Nigel Bruce as Watson, that aired on 12 February 1940. Another episode in the same series was adapted from the story by Max Ehrlich, and aired in April 1949 (with John Stanley as Holmes and Wendell Holmes as Watson).

John Gielgud played Holmes and Ralph Richardson played Watson in a radio adaptation that aired on NBC radio in April 1955. In the radio adaptation (also known as "The Yoxley [or Yatsley] Case"), Anna kills herself with a pistol rather than by poison.

Michael Hardwick dramatised the story as a radio adaptation for the BBC Light Programme, as part of the 1952–1969 radio series starring Carleton Hobbs as Holmes and Norman Shelley as Watson, with Andreas Malandrinos as Professor Coram. The adaptation aired in August 1962.

"The Golden Pince-Nez" was dramatised for BBC Radio 4 in 1993 by Peter Ling as part of the 1989–1998 radio series starring Clive Merrison as Holmes and Michael Williams as Watson, featuring Maurice Denham as Professor Coram and Maureen O'Brien as the Lady. At the end, while in custody, Anna jumps in front of a train, and Holmes remarks that this is how Anna Karenina dies.

The story was adapted as a 2010 episode of The Classic Adventures of Sherlock Holmes, a series on the American radio show Imagination Theatre, starring John Patrick Lowrie as Holmes and Lawrence Albert as Watson.

In 2023, the podcast Sherlock & Co. adapted the story in a three-episode adventure called "The Golden Pince-Nez", starring Harry Attwell as Sherlock Holmes, Paul Waggott as Dr. John Watson and Marta da Silva as Mariana "Mrs. Hudson" Ametxazurra.
