= The Adventure of the Abbey Grange =

1904 short story by Arthur Conan Doyle

- Short story by Arthur Conan Doyle
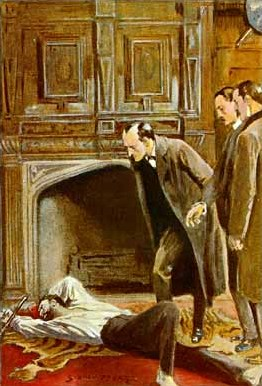
- Holmes examines the corpse, 1904 illustration by Sidney Paget

Text available at Wikisource
- Country: United Kingdom
- Language: English
- Genre: Detective fiction short stories

Publication
- Published in: Strand Magazine
- Publication date: September 1904

Chronology
- Series: The Return of Sherlock Holmes
The Adventure of the Missing Three-Quarter	The Adventure of the Second Stain

"The Adventure of the Abbey Grange", one of the 56 Sherlock Holmes short stories written by Sir Arthur Conan Doyle, is one of 13 stories in the cycle collected as The Return of Sherlock Holmes (1905). It was first published in The Strand Magazine in the United Kingdom in September 1904, and was also published in Collier's in the United States on 31 December 1904.

== Plot ==
Sherlock Holmes wakes up Dr. Watson early one winter morning to rush to a murder scene at the Abbey Grange near Chislehurst, Kent. Sir Eustace Brackenstall has been killed, apparently by burglars. Inspector Stanley Hopkins believes that it was the infamous Randall gang who have committed several other burglaries in the neighbourhood.

At Abbey Grange, Lady Brackenstall tells Holmes that her marriage was not happy; Sir Eustace was a violent, abusive drunkard. She then tells that about 11 o'clock, in the dining room, she encountered an elderly man coming in the French window, followed by two younger men. The older man struck her in the face, knocking her out. When she came to, she was gagged and tied to an oaken chair with the bellrope, which they had torn down. Sir Eustace came into the room and rushed at the intruders, one of whom struck and killed him with a poker. Lady Brackenstall fainted again for a minute or two. She saw the intruders drinking wine from a bottle taken from the sideboard. Then they left, taking some silver plate.

Sir Eustace's corpse is still lying at the murder scene. Hopkins tells Holmes some unsavoury things about Sir Eustace: that he poured petroleum over his wife's dog and set it alight, and once threw a decanter at her maid Theresa. Theresa corroborates Lady Brackenstall's account of Sir Eustace being an abusive alcoholic.

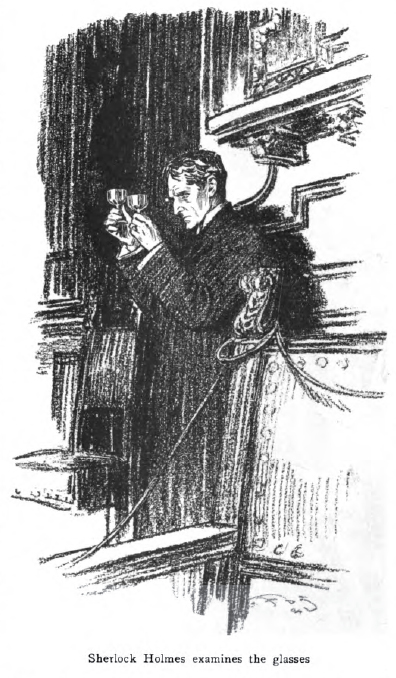
1904 illustration by Frederic Dorr Steele in Collier's

Examining the bellrope, Holmes notes that if it was tugged hard enough to tear it down, the bell would have rung in the kitchen, and asks why nobody heard it. Hopkins answers that it was late, and the kitchen is at the back of the house, where none of the servants would have heard. This suggests that the burglars must have known this, indicating a link between them and one of the servants. Oddly, the thieves stole only a few items of silver plate from the dining room. The half-empty wine bottle and glasses interest Holmes – the cork had been drawn with the corkscrew of a "multiplex knife", not the long corkscrew in the drawer, and one of the glasses has beeswing dregs in it, but the others have none.

Annoyed at being called to investigate a case that apparently has a ready-made solution, Holmes decides to catch the train back to London. However, after having mulled things over during the journey, Holmes thinks that Lady Brackenstall's story has too many holes in it and that probably she and Theresa have lied deliberately, staging a false crime scene. Upon returning to the Abbey Grange, Holmes, after examining again the supposed crime scene, reaches this conclusion: the killer cut the bellrope with a knife, and frayed the loose end to make it look broken. Holmes confronts Lady Brackenstall and Theresa, telling them he knows they are lying and demanding the truth, but they stand by their story. On the way out, Holmes notices a hole in the ice on the pond, and writes a note for Hopkins.

Holmes searches for the killer: almost certainly a sailor (indicated by the knots and the active physique) who was previously acquainted with Lady Brackenstall, and whom she and Theresa would protect. Lady Brackenstall travelled by the ocean liner Rock of Gibraltar of the Adelaide-Southampton Line, which is now halfway to Australia. However, the ship's first officer, Jack Crocker, who has been promoted to captain, has remained in England and in two days will take command of the company's new ship, Bass Rock. Holmes takes a cab to Scotland Yard but does not go in. He tells Watson he is reluctant to name the criminal to the police until he knows more.

That evening, Hopkins calls at 221B Baker Street, with two items of news:

- As suggested in Holmes' note, the stolen silver was found at the bottom of the pond. Holmes suggests that the theft was a blind—a deliberate false clue. However, Hopkins rationalises that the pond was chosen as a temporary hiding place.
- The Randall gang was arrested in New York that morning, so they couldn't have committed a murder in Kent the previous night.

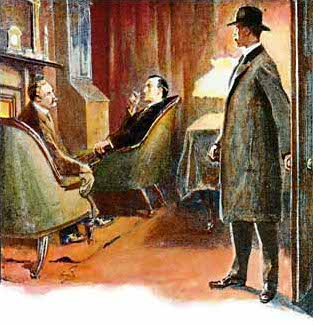
(l. to r.) Watson, Holmes and Captain Crocker, 1904 illustration by Sidney Paget

Later that evening, Captain Crocker comes to Baker Street, summoned by a telegram from Holmes. Holmes demands a full account of what happened at the Abbey Grange, warning Crocker that Holmes will summon the police if he lies or conceals anything.

Crocker met a woman named Mary (Lady Brackenstall) on the voyage from Australia. He fell in love with her, but not she with him. Then he happened to meet Theresa, who told him of Sir Eustace's abusive behaviour. He met secretly with Mary at the house; the last time on the previous night. They were in the dining room when Sir Eustace burst in, insulted Mary, and struck her with a cudgel. He then attacked Crocker, who killed him with the poker in self-defence. To avoid the scandal that could ensue, Crocker and Theresa concocted the cover story of burglars caught in the act. He cut down the bellrope exactly as Holmes deduced; he opened the wine bottle with his pocket knife's corkscrew; he took some silver plate and dropped it in the pond. Crocker adds that he has no regrets whatsoever.

Holmes tells Crocker that the police don't yet know the truth, and that he will wait 24 hours before revealing it, allowing Crocker to get away. Crocker indignantly refuses the offer, insisting that he will only agree to any version of the case that will leave Mary out of it. But Holmes was only testing Crocker, and is impressed by his loyalty to Mary. He has given Hopkins "an excellent hint" and doesn't feel he must do more. He designates Watson as the "jury", and asks him to "render a verdict." Watson declares Crocker "not guilty." Holmes tells Crocker he will keep silent unless someone else is charged, and that he may come back to Mary in a year.

== Publication history ==
"The Adventure of the Abbey Grange" was published in the UK in The Strand Magazine in September 1904, and in the US in Collier's on 31 December 1904. The story was published with eight illustrations by Sidney Paget in the Strand, and with six illustrations by Frederic Dorr Steele in Collier's. It was included in the short story collection The Return of Sherlock Holmes, which was published in the US in February 1905 and in the UK in March 1905.

== Adaptations ==
=== Film and television ===
The story was adapted as a short silent film titled The Abbey Grange (1922) in the Stoll film series starring Eille Norwood as Sherlock Holmes.

The story was adapted for the 1965 BBC series with Douglas Wilmer. Only the second of two reels of the 16mm telerecording of the episode exists.

"The Abbey Grange" is a 1986 episode of the Granada TV series featuring Jeremy Brett as Holmes.

=== Radio and audio dramas ===
A radio adaptation aired as an episode of the American radio series The Adventures of Sherlock Holmes. The episode was adapted by Edith Meiser and aired on 15 June 1931, with Richard Gordon as Sherlock Holmes and Leigh Lovell as Dr. Watson.

Meiser also adapted the story as an episode of the American radio series The New Adventures of Sherlock Holmes, with Basil Rathbone as Holmes and Nigel Bruce as Watson, that aired on 5 February 1940.

Michael Hardwick adapted the story for the BBC Light Programme, as part of the 1952–1969 radio series starring Carleton Hobbs as Holmes and Norman Shelley as Watson. The adaptation aired in 1962.

An adaptation of the story aired on BBC radio in 1978, starring Barry Foster as Holmes and David Buck as Watson. It was adapted by Michael Bakewell.

"The Abbey Grange" was dramatised for BBC Radio 4 in 1993 by Robert Forrest as part of the 1989–1998 radio series starring Clive Merrison as Holmes and Michael Williams as Watson. It featured Penny Downie as Lady Brackenstall.

The story was adapted as a 2014 episode of The Classic Adventures of Sherlock Holmes, a series on the American radio show Imagination Theatre, starring John Patrick Lowrie as Holmes and Lawrence Albert as Watson.

=== Other media ===
In 2014, Frogwares released a video game titled Sherlock Holmes: Crimes & Punishments, the fourth case of which, "The Abbey Grange Affair", adapts the elements of this story.

== Bibliography ==
- Cawthorne, Nigel (2011). A Brief History of Sherlock Holmes. Running Press. ISBN 978-0762444083.
- Dickerson, Ian (2019). Sherlock Holmes and His Adventures on American Radio. BearManor Media. ISBN 978-1629335087.
- Smith, Daniel (2014) [2009]. The Sherlock Holmes Companion: An Elementary Guide (Updated ed.). Aurum Press. ISBN 978-1-78131-404-3.
