= The Return of Sherlock Holmes =

1905 collection of stories by Arthur Conan Doyle

- First edition (US)
- Author: Arthur Conan Doyle
- Illustrator: Sidney Paget
- Language: English
- Series: Sherlock Holmes
- Genre: Detective fiction
- Publisher: George Newnes Ltd
- Publication date: 1905
- Publication place: United Kingdom
- Media type: Print (hardback)
- Pages: 403
- Preceded by: The Hound of the Baskervilles
- Followed by: The Valley of Fear
- Text: The Return of Sherlock Holmes at Wikisource

The Return of Sherlock Holmes is a 1905 collection of 13 Sherlock Holmes stories, originally published in 1903–1904, by British writer Arthur Conan Doyle. The stories were published in the Strand Magazine in Britain and Collier's in the United States.

== History ==
The book was first published in February 1905 by McClure, Phillips & Co. (New York), then on 7 March 1905 by Georges Newnes, Ltd. (London) It was the first Holmes collection since 1893, when Holmes had "died" in "The Final Problem". Having published The Hound of the Baskervilles, set before Holmes's "death", in 1901–1902, Doyle had come under intense pressure to revive the character. The first story, set in 1894, has Holmes returning in London and explaining the period from 1891–1894. Also of note is Watson's statement in the last story in the book that Holmes has retired and has forbidden him to publish any more stories (although again, two more collections and a novel appeared later).

== Contents ==
1. "The Adventure of the Empty House"
2. "The Adventure of the Norwood Builder"
3. "The Adventure of the Dancing Men"
4. "The Adventure of the Solitary Cyclist"
5. "The Adventure of the Priory School"
6. "The Adventure of Black Peter"
7. "The Adventure of Charles Augustus Milverton"
8. "The Adventure of the Six Napoleons"
9. "The Adventure of the Three Students"
10. "The Adventure of the Golden Pince-Nez"
11. "The Adventure of the Missing Three-Quarter"
12. "The Adventure of the Abbey Grange"
13. "The Adventure of the Second Stain"

== Adaptations ==
Multiple series have featured adaptations of all the stories in The Return of Sherlock Holmes, including the Sherlock Holmes Stoll film series (1921–1923), the radio series The Adventures of Sherlock Holmes (1930–1936), the radio series The New Adventures of Sherlock Holmes (1939–1950), and the BBC Sherlock Holmes 1952–1969 radio series.

Except for "Black Peter", "The Three Students", and "The Missing Three-Quarter", the stories in the collection were adapted for television as episodes of the Granada television series (1984–1994). All the stories in the collection were dramatised for BBC Radio 4 in 1993 as part of the Sherlock Holmes 1989–1998 radio series, and all were adapted as episodes of the radio series The Classic Adventures of Sherlock Holmes (2005–2016). Other adaptations of the stories in The Return of Sherlock Holmes have also been produced.
