= Sherlock Holmes (1952 radio series) =

- Norman Shelley (left) and Carleton Hobbs in costume as Watson and Holmes
- Genre: Radio drama Mystery
- Running time: 30-90 minutes
- Country of origin: United Kingdom
- Home station: BBC Home Service; BBC Light Programme
- Starring: Carleton Hobbs; Norman Shelley
- Original release: 15 October 1952 – 10 July 1969
- No. of series: 13
- No. of episodes: 80

Sherlock Holmes is the overall title given to the series of radio dramas adapted from Arthur Conan Doyle's Sherlock Holmes stories that aired between 1952 and 1969 on BBC radio stations. The episodes starred Carleton Hobbs as Sherlock Holmes and Norman Shelley as Dr. Watson. All but four of Doyle's sixty Sherlock Holmes stories were adapted with Hobbs and Shelley in the leading roles, and some of the stories were adapted more than once with different supporting actors.

Most of the episodes were first broadcast on the BBC Home Service or the BBC Light Programme. The episodes were often broadcast as part of programmes such as Children's Hour or Thirty-Minute Theatre and did not originally air with an overall series title. The title Sherlock Holmes was used for some of the individual series and has been used for the overall series.

== Production ==
Starring Carleton Hobbs as Sherlock Holmes and Norman Shelley as Dr. Watson, the episodes were originally broadcast on BBC radio stations. Only four Sherlock Holmes stories by Arthur Conan Doyle were not adapted with Hobbs and Shelley: "The Yellow Face", "The Gloria Scott", "The Creeping Man", and "The Veiled Lodger". The 1960 adaptation of The Valley of Fear starring Hobbs and Shelley was the first radio dramatisation of that story, which was the only Holmes story by Doyle that was not adapted as part of the earlier American radio series The Adventures of Sherlock Holmes. The 1989–1998 BBC radio series would become the first radio series to adapt all the stories.

Several stories were adapted more than once with Hobbs and Shelley playing Holmes and Watson respectively, each time with a different supporting cast. Eight stories were adapted twice and five were adapted three times. For example, Professor Moriarty was played by a different actor in each of the three dramatisations of the story "The Final Problem" in the series: Ralph Truman (1955), Felix Felton (1957) and Rolf Lefebvre (1967).

Most of the episodes were adapted by Michael Hardwick. The early episodes, through the 1958 adaptation of The Hound of the Baskervilles, were adapted by Felix Felton. The following episodes through the adaptation of The Valley of Fear were adapted by Michael Hardwick. Alan Wilson adapted "Black Peter" (1961). Felix Felton is credited as the adapter for the second dramatisation of The Hound of the Baskervilles. The rest of the episodes were adapted by Hardwick.

Some episodes were released on CD by the BBC. Many of the episodes that originally aired in 1959 or later have been rebroadcast on BBC Radio 4 Extra.

== Background ==
Before playing Sherlock Holmes in the series, Carleton Hobbs had played Watson, with Arthur Wontner (who played Holmes in the 1931–1937 film series) as Holmes, in a radio adaptation of "The Boscombe Valley Mystery" in 1943. Norman Shelley, who played Watson in the series, had previously played Watson with Laidman Browne as Holmes in a radio adaptation of "Silver Blaze" in 1945. Both of these adaptations aired on the BBC Home Service. In addition to playing Watson and Holmes, Carleton Hobbs would later play Sherlock Holmes creator Arthur Conan Doyle in a BBC radio drama that aired in 1972.

During the same period that some of the dramatisations with Hobbs and Shelley were broadcast on the BBC Home Service, John Gielgud and Ralph Richardson played Holmes and Watson respectively in a separate series of dramatisations of twelve Sherlock Holmes stories for the BBC Light Programme. The series was titled The Adventures of Sherlock Holmes and aired in 1954.

== Episode list ==
Most of the episodes were thirty minutes long. Aside from the six-part adaptation of The Hound of the Baskervilles, the episodes adapted from novels were ninety minutes long.

Hobbs and Shelley also played Holmes and Watson respectively in a radio dramatisation of the play Sherlock Holmes, adapted for radio by Raymond Raikes. The production aired on the BBC Home Service on 3 January 1953.

Series 1

The following episodes aired on Children's Hour in 1952–1953 on the BBC Home Service.

No. overall	No. in series	Episode title	First broadcast
1	1	"The Naval Treaty"	15 October 1952
2	2	"The Five Orange Pips"	12 November 1952
3	3	"The Blue Carbuncle"	10 December 1952
4	4	"The Red-Headed League"	7 January 1953
5	5	"The Three Students"	4 February 1953

Series 2

The following episodes aired on Children's Hour in 1954–1955 on the BBC Home Service.

No. overall	No. in series	Episode title	First broadcast
6	1	"The Norwood Builder"	7 October 1954
7	2	"The Bruce-Partington Plans"	4 November 1954
8	3	"The Mazarin Stone"	2 December 1954
9	4	"The Missing Three-Quarter"	6 January 1955
10	5	"The Copper Beeches"	3 February 1955
11	6	"The Final Problem"	3 March 1955

Series 3

The following episodes aired on Children's Hour in 1957 on the BBC Home Service.

No. overall	No. in series	Episode title	First broadcast
12	1	"The Naval Treaty"	11 October 1957
13	2	"The Five Orange Pips"	18 October 1957
14	3	"The Adventure of the Blue Carbuncle"	25 October 1957
15	4	"The Red-Headed League"	1 November 1957
16	5	"The Three Students"	8 November 1957
17	6	"The Final Problem"	15 November 1957

Series 4

The following episodes aired in 1958 on the BBC Light Programme, and are all parts of a six-part adaptation of The Hound of the Baskervilles.

No. overall	No. in series	Episode title	First broadcast
18	1	"The Baskerville Curse"	6 April 1958
19	2	"Sir Henry Baskerville"	13 April 1958
20	3	"Baskerville Hall"	20 April 1958
21	4	"The Light on the Moor"	27 April 1958
22	5	"Death on the Moor"	4 May 1958
23	6	"The Final Ordeal"	11 May 1958

Series 5

The following episodes aired on Thirty-Minute Theatre in 1959 on the BBC Light Programme.

No. overall	No. in series	Episode title	First broadcast
24	1	"The Man with the Twisted Lip"	12 May 1959
25	2	"The Beryl Coronet"	30 June 1959
26	3	"The Blanched Soldier"	4 August 1959
27	4	"The Copper Beeches"	11 August 1959
28	5	"The Noble Bachelor"	18 August 1959
29	6	"Shoscombe Old Place"	25 August 1959

Series 6

The following episodes aired in Thirty-Minute Theatre in 1960 on the BBC Light Programme.

No. overall	No. in series	Episode title	First broadcast
30	1	"The Stockbroker's Clerk"	23 February 1960
31	2	"The Naval Treaty"	22 March 1960
32	3	"The Greek Interpreter"	5 April 1960
33	4	"The Cardboard Box"	19 April 1960
34	5	"The Disappearance of Lady Frances Carfax"	3 May 1960
35	6	"The Engineer's Thumb"	17 May 1960
36	7	"The Illustrious Client"	31 May 1960

Series 7

The following episodes aired in 1960–1961. "The Valley of Fear" and "The Hound of the Baskervilles" are each ninety minutes long and first aired on the BBC Home Service. "Black Peter" is thirty minutes long and first aired on the BBC Light Programme.

No. overall	Episode title	First broadcast
37	"The Valley of Fear"	31 December 1960
38	"Black Peter"	5 March 1961
39	"The Hound of the Baskervilles"	5 August 1961

Series 8

The following episodes aired in 1961–1962 on the BBC Light Programme, without a series title.

No. overall	No. in series	Episode title	First broadcast
40	1	"The Empty House"	27 November 1961
41	2	"The Reigate Squires"	4 December 1961
42	3	"The Resident Patient"	11 December 1961
43	4	"Charles Augustus Milverton"	18 December 1961
44	5	"The Blue Carbuncle"	25 December 1961
45	6	"Thor Bridge"	1 January 1962
46	7	"The Priory School"	8 January 1962

Series 9

The following episodes aired under the title Sherlock Holmes in 1962 on the BBC Light Programme.

No. overall	No. in series	Episode title	First broadcast
47	1	"The Speckled Band"	17 July 1962
48	2	"Silver Blaze"	24 July 1962
49	3	"The Musgrave Ritual"	31 July 1962
50	4	"The Golden Pince-Nez"	7 August 1962
51	5	"The Missing Three-Quarter"	14 August 1962
52	6	"The Abbey Grange"	21 August 1962
53	7	"The Devil's Foot"	28 August 1962
54	8	"The Mazarin Stone"	4 September 1962

Series 10

The following ninety-minute episodes aired on the BBC Home Service on Saturday-Night Theatre.

No. overall	Episode title	First broadcast
55	"A Study in Scarlet"	22 December 1962
56	"The Sign of the Four"	2 March 1963

Series 11

The following episodes aired under the title Sherlock Holmes Returns in 1964 on the BBC Light Programme. The first two episodes in the series were repeated recordings of the episodes that aired on 21 August 1962 and 4 September 1962 respectively.

No. overall	No. in series	Episode title	First broadcast
–	1	"The Abbey Grange"	7 August 1964
–	2	"The Mazarin Stone"	14 August 1964
57	3	"The Solitary Cyclist"	21 August 1964
58	4	"The Bruce-Partington Plans"	28 August 1964
59	5	"The Three Garridebs"	4 September 1964
60	6	"The Norwood Builder"	11 September 1964
61	7	"The Sussex Vampire"	18 September 1964
62	8	"The Red-Headed League"	25 September 1964
63	9	"The Three Gables"	2 October 1964
64	10	"The Retired Colourman"	9 October 1964

Series 12

The following episodes aired under the title Sherlock Holmes Again in 1966–1967 on the BBC Light Programme.

No. overall	No. in series	Episode title	First broadcast
65	1	"A Scandal in Bohemia"	21 November 1966
66	2	"The Five Orange Pips"	28 November 1966
67	3	"The Six Napoleons"	5 December 1966
68	4	"The Boscombe Valley Mystery"	12 December 1966
69	5	"The Crooked Man"	19 December 1966
70	6	"Wisteria Lodge"	26 December 1966
71	7	"The Dying Detective"	2 January 1967
72	8	"The Second Stain"	9 January 1967
73	9	"The Final Problem"	16 January 1967

Series 13

The following episodes aired under the title Sherlock Holmes in 1969 on BBC Radio 2.

No. overall	No. in series	Episode title	First broadcast
74	1	"The Dancing Men"	24 June 1969
75	2	"A Case of Identity"	26 June 1969
76	3	"Black Peter"	1 July 1969
77	4	"The Red Circle"	3 July 1969
78	5	"The Lion's Mane"	8 July 1969
79	6	"His Last Bow"	10 July 1969
