= Mollie Hardwick =

British author

Mollie Greenhalgh Hardwick (7 March 1916 in Prestwich, Lancashire – 13 December 2003), also known as Mary Atkinson, was an English author who was best known for writing books that accompanied the TV series Upstairs, Downstairs.

Hardwick began her career as a radio announcer at the BBC in the 1940s, and following the Second World War worked in the corporation's drama department until 1962. As well as writing Upstairs, Downstairs, Thomas & Sarah and The Duchess of Duke Street, she was also the creator of the Doran Fairweather novels and wrote three Juliet Bravo books. Hardwick also wrote many books and plays based on the Sherlock Holmes stories, and a couple of biographies of Lady Emma Hamilton and Mary Anne Disraeli.

She married fellow author Michael Hardwick in 1961 and together they co-wrote numerous books, mostly relating to Sherlock Holmes but also a number on Charles Dickens. The couple lived in a medieval house in a village in Kent. She died after a fire broke out at her flat in Muswell Hill, London in 2003.
