= The Adventures of Sherlock Holmes (1930 radio series) =

American radio show (1930–1936)

The Adventures of Sherlock Holmes is an American old-time radio show that aired on US radio networks between 1930 and 1936. The series was adapted from Sir Arthur Conan Doyle's Sherlock Holmes stories by scriptwriter Edith Meiser. For most of the series, Richard Gordon played Sherlock Holmes and Leigh Lovell played Dr. Watson.

The series included multiple original stories by Meiser, in addition to Meiser's adaptations of all of Doyle's Sherlock Holmes stories except one. Some episodes in the series were remakes of scripts that had been used for episodes in earlier seasons of the show.

== Production ==
Edith Meiser first pitched the idea of a radio series based on Conan Doyle's detective. Episodes for the series were adapted for broadcast by Meiser. The show was titled Sherlock Holmes, The Adventures of Sherlock Holmes, and Sherlock Holmes Stories in different radio listings.

The premiere episode featured an adaptation of "The Adventure of the Speckled Band" (October 20, 1930). It starred William Gillette as Sherlock Holmes and Leigh Lovell as Dr Watson. The following episodes in the series mainly featured Richard Gordon in the role of Holmes until 1933 and Louis Hector from 1934 to 1935. Richard Gordon again played the lead role for the last season in 1936.

Edith Meiser dramatised fifty-nine of the sixty Sherlock Holmes stories by Arthur Conan Doyle, with the same actors, Richard Gordon and Leigh Lovell, playing Holmes and Watson respectively in the adaptations, including a remake of "The Adventure of the Speckled Band". The 59th Sherlock Holmes story adapted by Meiser was "The Adventure of the Blue Carbuncle", which aired in late 1932.

The story that was not dramatised, The Valley of Fear, would not be adapted for radio until 1960, when the BBC adapted it for radio for the 1952–1969 radio series. An adaptation of The Valley of Fear was not produced because the story concerns labour relations in the Pennsylvania coalfields and was therefore thought to be potentially too political. Another Sherlock Holmes story, "The Final Problem", was loosely adapted for episodes titled "Murder in the Waxworks" (March 1932), "The Adventure of the Ace of Spades" (May 1932), and "Murder by Proxy" (January 1933). It was not directly adapted because Meiser was concerned that broadcasting it might presage the end of the series.

For the series, Meiser also wrote episodes inspired by cases alluded to in the Sherlock Holmes canon, namely "The Giant Rat of Sumatra" (June 1932 and July 1936), "The Case of Vamberry, the Wine Merchant" (December 1934), and "The Singular Affair of the Aluminium Crutch" (January 1935). Meiser also adapted two of Arthur Conan Doyle's non-Holmes stories, "The Jewish Breastplate" and "The Lost Special". Both episodes aired in November 1934.

The first four seasons aired on the NBC's Blue Network. The fifth season aired on the Mutual Broadcasting System through September 1936. The show then moved to the NBC Red network in October 1936. On the NBC network, the episodes were broadcast live and have therefore not survived. The Mutual Broadcasting System required episodes to be recorded for future rebroadcast, so sound recordings from this era of the show survived.

The George Washington Coffee Company, creator of the first instant coffee, sponsored the series, until the fifth season, when the Household Finance Co. became the show's new sponsor.

== Cast ==
Sherlock Holmes:

- William Gillette (1930, premiere episode only)
- Clive Brook (1930, 2nd and 3rd episodes only)
- Richard Gordon (1930–1933, 1936)
- Louis Hector (the fourth season, 1934–1935)

Dr Watson:

- Leigh Lovell (1930–1935)
- Harry West (the fifth season, 1936)

The announcer and narrator was actor Joseph Bell. Little information is available about other cast members. Agnes Moorehead played roles in many episodes. The show's writer Edith Meiser was also an actress and occasionally played parts on the show. According to a contemporary review, Lucille Wall played "the star feminine part" in the first episode. Louis Hector played Professor Moriarty in a 1932 episode before playing Holmes in the show's fourth season.

== Episodes ==
=== First season (October 1930–June 1931) ===
This series comprised only stories adapted from Arthur Conan Doyle's Sherlock Holmes stories. The season aired from 20 October 1930 to 15 June 1931 and included 35 episodes, including two broadcasts of "The Noble Bachelor", adapted from "The Adventure of the Noble Bachelor". The first episode was "The Adventure of the Speckled Band", and the last episode of the season was an adaptation of "The Adventure of the Abbey Grange", titled "The Adventure of Abbey Grange".

=== Second season (September 1931–June 1932) ===
This series comprised some adaptations of Conan Doyle and original material devised by Meiser. The season had 33 episodes and aired from 17 September 1931 to 23 June 1932. The first episode of the season was a remake of "The Adventure of the Speckled Band", and the last episode was an adaptation of "The Adventure of the Second Stain". The season included a four-episode adaptation of A Study in Scarlet, and a six-episode dramatization of The Hound of the Baskervilles.

=== Third season (October 1932–May 1933) ===
This series comprised some adaptations of Conan Doyle and original material devised by Meiser. The series aired from 5 October 1932 to 31 May 1933 and included a six-episode dramatization of The Sign of Four. There were 34 episodes, though the titles of two episodes are not known. The first episode was an adaptation of "The Adventure of the Empty House", and the last episode was "The Corpse in the Cab", an original story based on "The Adventure of the Norwood Builder". An adaptation of "The Adventure of the Blue Carbuncle" aired on 28 December 1932 and was the 59th Sherlock Holmes story by Arthur Conan Doyle to be adapted by the team of Edith Meiser, Richard Gordon, and Leigh Lovell.

=== Fourth season (November 1934–May 1935) ===
This series mostly featured original stories by Edith Meiser, and featured Louis Hector as Holmes opposite Leigh Lovell's Watson. The season, which ran from 11 November 1934 to 26 May 1935, featured 29 episodes, though two episodes have unknown titles. The first was "The Jewish Breastplate", adapted from Arthur Conan Doyle's non-Sherlock Holmes story "The Story of the Jew's Breast-Plate", which was first published in The Strand Magazine in 1899. The last episode of the season was "The Reigate Puzzle", a remake of an earlier episode adapted from "The Adventure of the Reigate Squire". There were also several other remakes of older episodes.

=== Fifth season (February 1936–December 1936) ===
All the scripts for the fifth-season episodes were ones that had been used previously on the show, partly because Edith Meiser was busy after signing a movie contract with RKO in May 1936. The scripts would have been modified slightly to allow for the change in sponsor and possibly the change in actors. The season featured 48 episodes, starting with "The Speckled Band" and ending with the six-part serial The Hound of the Baskervilles. The season ran from 1 February to 24 December 1936.

== Reception ==
At the end of the first season, a survey of American radio editors found that 94% said The Adventures of Sherlock Holmes was the best radio program.
