= Frederic Dorr Steele =

American illustrator

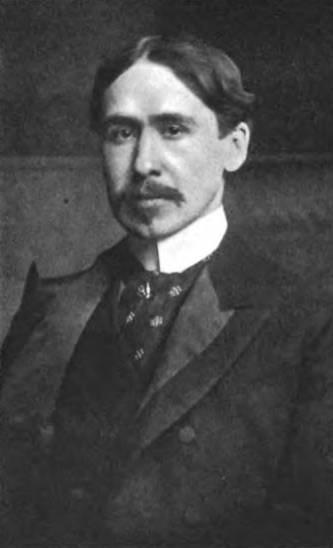
- Frederic Dorr Steele (circa 1901)
- Born: August 6, 1873; Eagle Mills, Michigan, U.S.
- Died: July 6, 1944 (aged 70); Kips Bay, New York, U.S.
- Education: Art Students' League; National Academy of Design

Frederic Dorr Steele (August 6, 1873 – July 6, 1944) was an American illustrator best known for his work on Arthur Conan Doyle's Sherlock Holmes stories.

== Early life and education ==
Steele was born on 6 August 1873 at Eagle Mills, near Marquette, Michigan. He was the first of three children born to William Henry Steele and Zulma De Lacy Steele, née Dorr. In 1876, his family moved to Appleton, Wisconsin. His brother Joseph Dorr Steele was born in 1879, and his sister Zulma Steele was born in 1881. The family moved to Rutland, Vermont in 1889.

Steele was encouraged to pursue his artistic inclinations by his mother, who was an artist, and also by his maternal grandmother, author Julia C. R. Dorr. By the age of 16, he had decided to become a professional artist. He went to New York City in 1889 to acquire the necessary training and experience. He studied at the Art Students' League and the National Academy of Design.

== Career ==
=== Overview ===
While studying art, Steele supported himself for three years by working as an architectural draftsman. He next served a two-year apprenticeship in the Harper publishing firm's art department. He worked for The Illustrated American from 1896 to 1897, and then moved into freelance illustration. He made his first attempt at color illustration for Mary Catherine Lee's story "The Wheel of Time", which appeared in the November 1900 issue of Scribner's Magazine. His work for Scribner's also included the use of color tints for two Sewell Ford horse stories, published in 1901 and 1902 respectively. In 1902, Steele was elected a member of the Society of Illustrators.

Arthur Hoeber wrote an article about Steele that was published in the April 1901 issue of The Book Buyer. According to Hoeber's article, Steele used various media to produce art but preferred crayon, which for him was the most immediately expressive medium. He continued to favor crayon throughout his career. Hoeber also wrote that Steele admired the work of multiple artists including Steinlen, Lepère, and others.

Magazines for which Steele did illustrations included The Century Magazine, McClure's, The American Magazine, Metropolitan Magazine, Woman's Home Companion and Everybody's Magazine (for which he was art editor during World War I). Steele provided illustrations for various novels such as Richard Harding Davis's The Scarlet Car (1907), E. W. Hornung's The Crime Doctor (1914), and Geraldine Bonner's The Black Eagle Mystery (1916).

His career as a magazine illustrator declined with the coming of the Great Depression, and he turned to newspapers, particularly the New York Herald-Tribune. Steele produced illustrations for the newspaper's theatrical section. Between 1928 and 1944, some 200 illustrations by Steele representing many different plays appeared in the Herald-Tribune. He illustrated a 1941 edition of W. Somerset Maugham's The Moon and Sixpence.

=== Sherlock Holmes illustrations ===
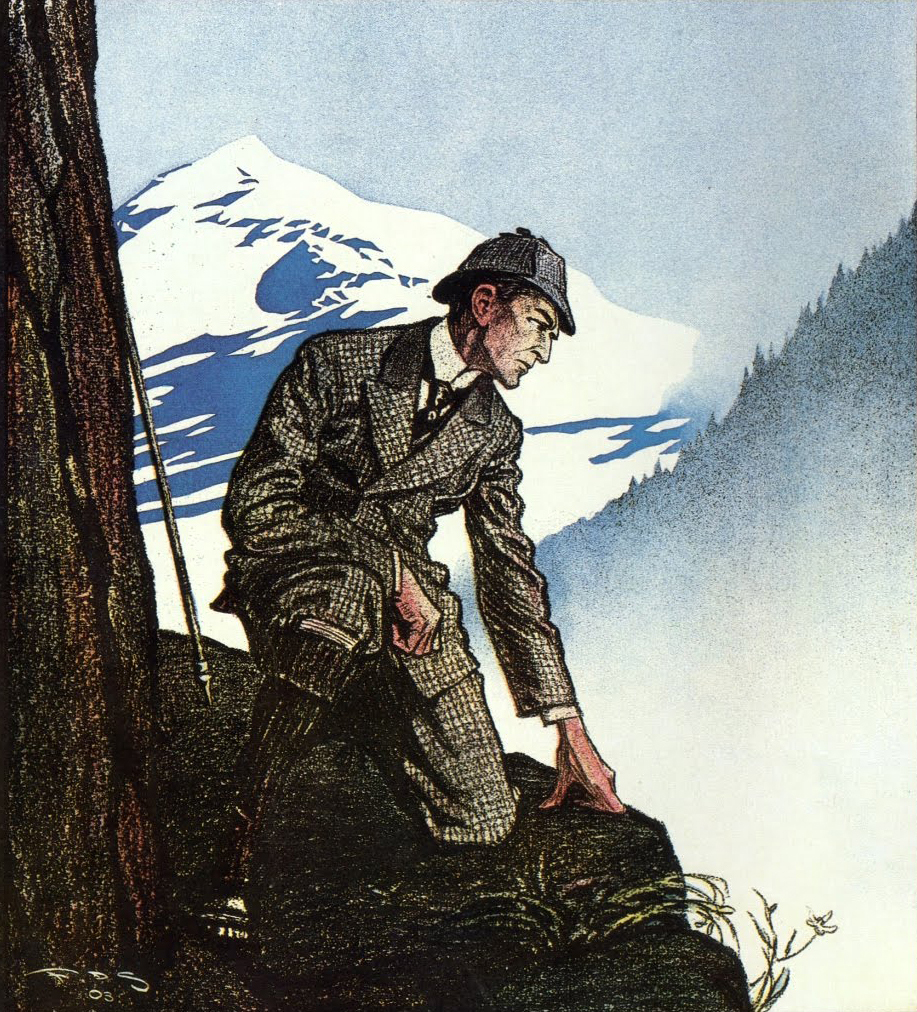
Sherlock Holmes at Reichenbach Falls, as drawn by Steele for the cover of the Collier's issue containing "The Adventure of the Empty House" (1903)

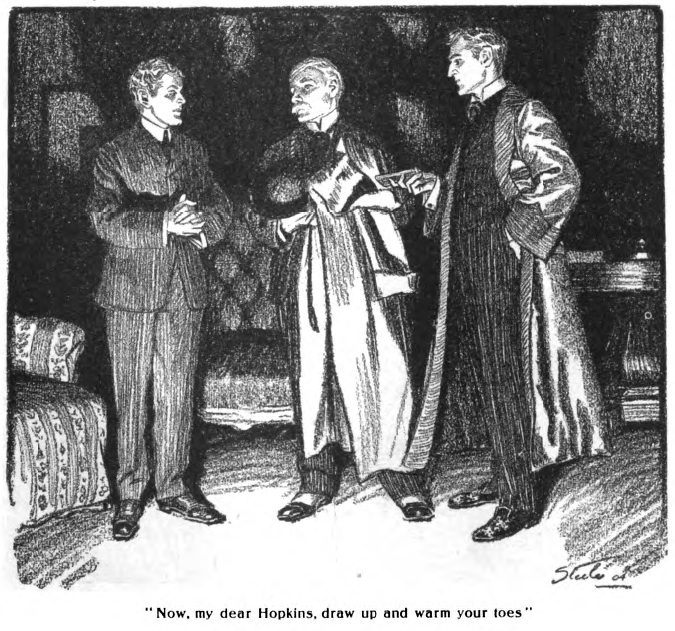
Illustration by Steele of Inspector Hopkins, Dr. Watson, and Sherlock Holmes in "The Adventure of the Golden Pince-Nez" (Collier's, 1904)

For Collier's Weekly in 1903, Steele was invited to do the illustrations for The Return of Sherlock Holmes by Arthur Conan Doyle. He continued to produce drawings for Sherlock Holmes stories for various publishers during the rest of his career. He illustrated 26 of the last 33 Sherlock Holmes stories for their initial American magazine appearances. Steele was the foremost American illustrator of the Holmes stories. His illustrations were largely responsible for popularizing the association of Holmes with a curved pipe and deerstalker hat.

Steele's illustrations for the thirteen stories in The Return of Sherlock Holmes were made in Deerfield, Massachusetts. His model for Sherlock Holmes for these stories was an English model named Robert King, who traveled to Deerfield to work with Steele. For later stories, Steele drew Holmes from other models including Frank B. Wilson and S. B. Doughty.

He based his depiction of Holmes on the portrayal of the character by the American actor William Gillette, who starred in the play Sherlock Holmes in its 1899 premiere and later productions. Steele wrote an essay titled "Sherlock Holmes: A Little History of the World's Most Famous Fictional Character" for a souvenir program for the play dated November 22, 1929. In a part of the essay concerning illustrations, he acknowledged that he based his depiction of Holmes on Gillette, and addressed a misconception that his drawings influenced Gillette's portrayal:

Everybody agreed that Mr. Gillette was the ideal Sherlock Holmes, and it was inevitable that I should copy him. So I made my models look like him, and even in two or three instances used photographs of him in my drawings. But while the actor was seen by thousands, the magazines and books were seen by millions; so after a score of years had gone by, few could remember which "did it first." Even so well informed a historian as Mr. Clayton Hamilton has tried to give me credit which belongs entirely to Mr. Gillette.

He also wrote in the essay that he did not see Gillette's play until 1905, and that he drew Gillette from life for the first time in 1929.

Steele illustrated a Sherlock Holmes parody by Carolyn Wells titled "The Adventure of the Clothes-line", which was published in The Century Magazine in May 1915. Steele was a fan of Holmes, and wrote four short Sherlock Holmes parodies that have been published in various periodicals and collections: "The Adventure of the Missing Hatrack" (1926), "The Adventure of the Missing Artist" (1928), "The Attempted Murder of Malcolm Duncan" (1932), and "The Adventure of the Murdered Art Editor" (1933).

Vincent Starrett dedicated his 1933 book The Private Life of Sherlock Holmes to Steele and two other people including William Gillette. In the book, Starrett praised Steele's illustrations of the Holmes stories, stating that "No happier association of author and artist can be imagined". Starrett also wrote that there was a popular misconception that Gillette was influenced by Steele's drawings rather than the reverse.

An article by Steele titled "Sherlock Holmes in Pictures" appeared in The New Yorker on May 22, 1937. A slightly revised version of this article was included in Starrett's 1940 anthology 221B: Studies in Sherlock Holmes. Steele illustrated the dust jacket of Ellery Queen's 1944 anthology The Misadventures of Sherlock Holmes, which also included other work by Steele.

== Personal life ==
Steele married Mary ("Polly") Thyng in 1898, and for much of the time until 1912 they lived at Nutley, New Jersey, then returning to New York. Their first child, John Frederic Steele, was born in 1899 but died at the age of three. The couple had three more children: Anne Steele Marsh (born Anne Gould Steele), Robert Gilmore Steele, and Zulma Steele Grey (born Zulma Ripley Steele). Steele was a member of The Players and edited the club's publication The Players Bulletin for several years. He and his wife separated in 1936 but never divorced. He spent his later years living in his studio at 717 Greenwich Street.

== Death and legacy ==
In the last years of his life, Steele used medicine for a heart condition. In the spring of 1944, he suffered a breakdown in health and was brought to the Mountainside Hospital in New Jersey, where he was diagnosed with pellagra. He spent two months there, and then stayed for a similar period at the Columbia Presbyterian Medical Center in New York. He died at Bellevue Hospital, New York on 6 July 1944. He was cremated and his ashes were interred in a family plot at the Albany Rural Cemetery.

Between March 26 and April 7, 1945, a memorial exhibition of his work was held at the Morton Galleries in New York. His children donated a large collection of manuscripts, photographs, artwork, and other materials relating to Steele's life and career to the University of Minnesota Libraries in 1986. There are plans to erect a memorial stone at his resting place in his honor.
