= The Adventure of the Three Gables =

Short story by Arthur Conan Doyle

- Short story by Arthur Conan Doyle
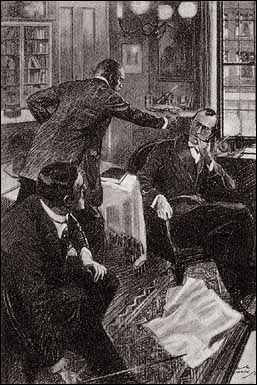
- 1926 illustration by Howard K. Elcock

Text available at Wikisource

Publication
- Publication date: 1926

Chronology
- Series: The Case-Book of Sherlock Holmes
The Illustrious Client	The Blanched Soldier

"The Adventure of the Three Gables" is one of the 56 Sherlock Holmes short stories by British writer Arthur Conan Doyle, collected as one of 12 in The Case-Book of Sherlock Holmes. It was first published in The Strand Magazine in 1926 as a serial.

== Plot ==
The story begins with a visit to 221B Baker Street from Steve Dixie, a black man and a cowardly ruffian who warns Sherlock Holmes to keep away from Harrow. Although Dixie has come to intimidate Holmes, Holmes secures Dixie's future cooperation by threatening to tell what he knows about the suspicious Perkins death involving Dixie. Dixie's boss is Barney Stockdale, and he must be connected with the Harrow Weald case, of which Holmes has just learnt from a message from Mary Maberley, a lady who lives at Three Gables, a house at Harrow Weald.

Mrs Maberley is an elderly woman whose son has recently died in Rome. He was an attaché there. Some peculiar things have happened at Three Gables. Mrs Maberley has lived there nearly two years and in all that time has attracted very little attention from her neighbours. Suddenly, however, a man came to her recently and offered to buy her house and all the furniture in it. She was not really willing to do it, especially after her lawyer, Mr Sutro, told her that the legal agreement drawn up by this prospective buyer would forbid her to remove any possessions from the house when she moved out.

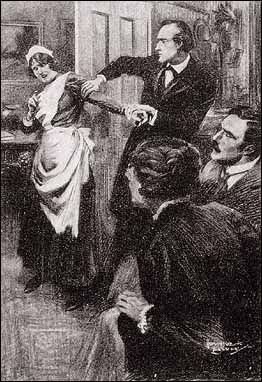
An illustration from Strand Magazine in 1926 by Howard Elcock. It shows Sherlock Holmes suddenly opening a door and catching Susan eavesdropping on his conversation with Mrs Mary Maberley.

As she is telling Holmes this story, he becomes aware that someone is eavesdropping on the conversation. He opens a door and drags in Susan, a wheezing maid. Holmes manages to establish that Susan communicated to Barney Stockdale the fact that her mistress was hiring Sherlock Holmes, and that precipitated Steve Dixie's visit. Holmes also finds out that a rich woman hired Barney Stockdale and his thugs to do her dirty work. Susan is also a member of the gang but will not give up all their secrets. She leaves in a huff.

Obviously, this woman wants something that has come into the house quite recently. Holmes, seeing some trunks with Italian placenames on them, realizes that her late son Douglas's belongings must hold the key. He instructs Mrs Maberley to try to get Mr Sutro to spend a couple of nights at Three Gables, to keep the house guarded.

Holmes finds Dixie outside, keeping the house under surveillance. Dixie is now inclined to help Holmes if he can, to avoid any indiscreet talk about the Perkins lad who met his end so tragically. He swears, however, that he does not know who has hired Barney Stockdale.

The following day, the Three Gables is burgled, and Holmes and Watson go back to investigate. The burglars chloroformed Mrs Maberley and stole a manuscript from her son's belongings. She had managed to grab part of one sheet of paper from it when, coming round, she lunged after one of the thieves.

The police inspector at the scene treats the matter as an ordinary burglary, but Holmes knows better. He examines the bit of manuscript retained by Mrs Maberley, and it appears to be the end of a lurid novel. Holmes is struck by the peculiar wording; the story abruptly changes from third-person narration to first-person narration. It is in Douglas's handwriting; so it would seem that he was putting himself in a story that he was writing.

Holmes and Watson go to see Isadora Klein, a wealthy woman who is used to getting what she wants. The happenings at Three Gables, and the information Holmes obtained from Langdale Pike, "his human book of reference upon all matters of social scandal", have all added up to something. It turns out that Douglas Maberley was involved with Isadora Klein at one time. She broke the relationship off, and he almost wrought his revenge by writing a thinly veiled account of their affair, to be published as a novel. Everyone in London would know who the characters truly were, were the novel ever published. Isadora established that no copy had ever been sent to Douglas's publisher but realized that he must have a copy. She hired Barney Stockdale and his confederates to secure the manuscript. She tried legal means at first, and when that did not work, she resorted to crime. She has burnt the manuscript.

Holmes forces Isadora Klein to write a cheque for £5,000 (equivalent to £264,239 in 2025) to furnish Mrs Maberley with a first-class trip round the world in return for his silence about Isadora's nefarious dealings.

== Commentaries ==
"The Adventure of the Three Gables" has been criticized for its reliance on racist stereotypes in the portrayal of the black boxer, Steve Dixie. This contrasts strikingly with Doyle's earlier sympathetic portrayal of an interracial marriage, in "The Adventure of the Yellow Face" (1893).

D. Martin Dakin wrote that "no admirer of Holmes can read these scenes [with or discussing Steve Dixie] without a blush". Dakin saw Holmes's crude jeers at Dixie as completely out of character for the detective, and this was one reason behind his conclusion that someone other than Doyle had in fact written the story. Others, including Walter Pond, have rejected Dakin's argument and concluded that there is no reason to doubt Doyle's authorship.

== Publication history ==
"The Adventure of the Three Gables" was first published in the US in Liberty in September 1926, and in the UK in The Strand Magazine in October 1926. The story was published with six illustrations by Frederic Dorr Steele in Liberty, and with four illustrations by Howard K. Elcock in the Strand. It was included in the short story collection The Case-Book of Sherlock Holmes, which was published in the UK and the US in June 1927.

== Adaptations ==
=== Radio and audio dramas ===
The story was adapted by Edith Meiser as an episode of the American radio series The Adventures of Sherlock Holmes that aired on 12 November 1931, with Richard Gordon as Sherlock Holmes and Leigh Lovell as Dr. Watson. Another episode adapted from the story aired on 7 April 1935 (with Louis Hector as Holmes and Lovell as Watson).

Meiser also adapted the story as an episode of the American radio series The New Adventures of Sherlock Holmes that aired on 18 January 1942, with Basil Rathbone as Holmes and Nigel Bruce as Watson.

A radio adaptation of the story aired in 1964 on the BBC Light Programme, as part of the 1952–1969 radio series starring Carleton Hobbs as Holmes and Norman Shelley as Watson. It was adapted by Michael Hardwick. The cast included Frank Singuineau as Steve Dixie and Selma Vaz Dias as Isadora Klein.

"The Three Gables" was dramatised for BBC Radio 4 in 1994 by Peter Ling as part of the 1989–1998 radio series starring Clive Merrison as Holmes and Michael Williams as Watson, featuring Susannah Corbett as Susan Stockdale and Mary Wimbush as Mrs Maberly. In this adaptation, it is stated that "Langdale Pike" is a pen name derived from the Langdale Pikes, and that his real name is Clarence Gable.

In 2007, the story was adapted as an episode of The Classic Adventures of Sherlock Holmes, a series on the American radio show Imagination Theatre, with John Patrick Lowrie as Holmes and Lawrence Albert as Watson. Like in the 1994 BBC adaptation, it is stated in the episode that "Langdale Pike" is a pseudonym. In this adaptation, he is a disinherited member of a noble family and his real name is implied to be Lord Peter.

In 2024, the podcast Sherlock & Co. adapted the story in a three-episode adventure called "The Three Gables", starring Harry Attwell as Sherlock Holmes, Paul Waggott as Dr. John Watson and Marta da Silva as Mariana "Mrs. Hudson" Ametxazurra.

=== Television ===
Granada Television's Sherlock Holmes series featuring Jeremy Brett as Holmes and Edward Hardwicke as Dr Watson presented the story with several differences. Douglas Maberley is depicted as Mary Maberley's grandson instead of her son; he dies in his grandmother's house after a month of suffering from a bout of pneumonia caused by a savage beating he received from Mrs Klein's hired boxers; Langdale Pike defines himself as a benevolent counterpart of Charles Augustus Milverton (the eponym of an earlier story about a blackmailer, although his last name is slightly different) and points out that he suppresses more than he exposes; and Steve Dixie retains some enmity towards Holmes and brawls with Watson during the break-in.

In CBS' contemporary Sherlock Holmes adaptation Elementary, the season 2 premiere episode, "Step Nine", features a case very briefly involving a character named Langdale Pike, the owner of a 3D printer manufacturing company that Holmes seeks out via a sign requesting something from him, which he holds up in front of a security camera for an extended period of time.

The episode "The Adventure of the Blue Polar Bear" from the NHK puppet series Sherlock Holmes, is based on "The Adventure of the Three Gables" and "The Adventure of the Blue Carbuncle". It features Isadora Klein as a female juvenile gang leader.

== Sources ==
- Cawthorne, Nigel (2011). A Brief History of Sherlock Holmes. Running Press. ISBN 978-0762444083.
- Dickerson, Ian (2019). Sherlock Holmes and His Adventures on American Radio. BearManor Media. ISBN 978-1629335087.
- Smith, Daniel (2014) [2009]. The Sherlock Holmes Companion: An Elementary Guide (Updated ed.). Aurum Press. ISBN 978-1-78131-404-3.
