= The Adventure of the Illustrious Client =

- Short story by Arthur Conan Doyle
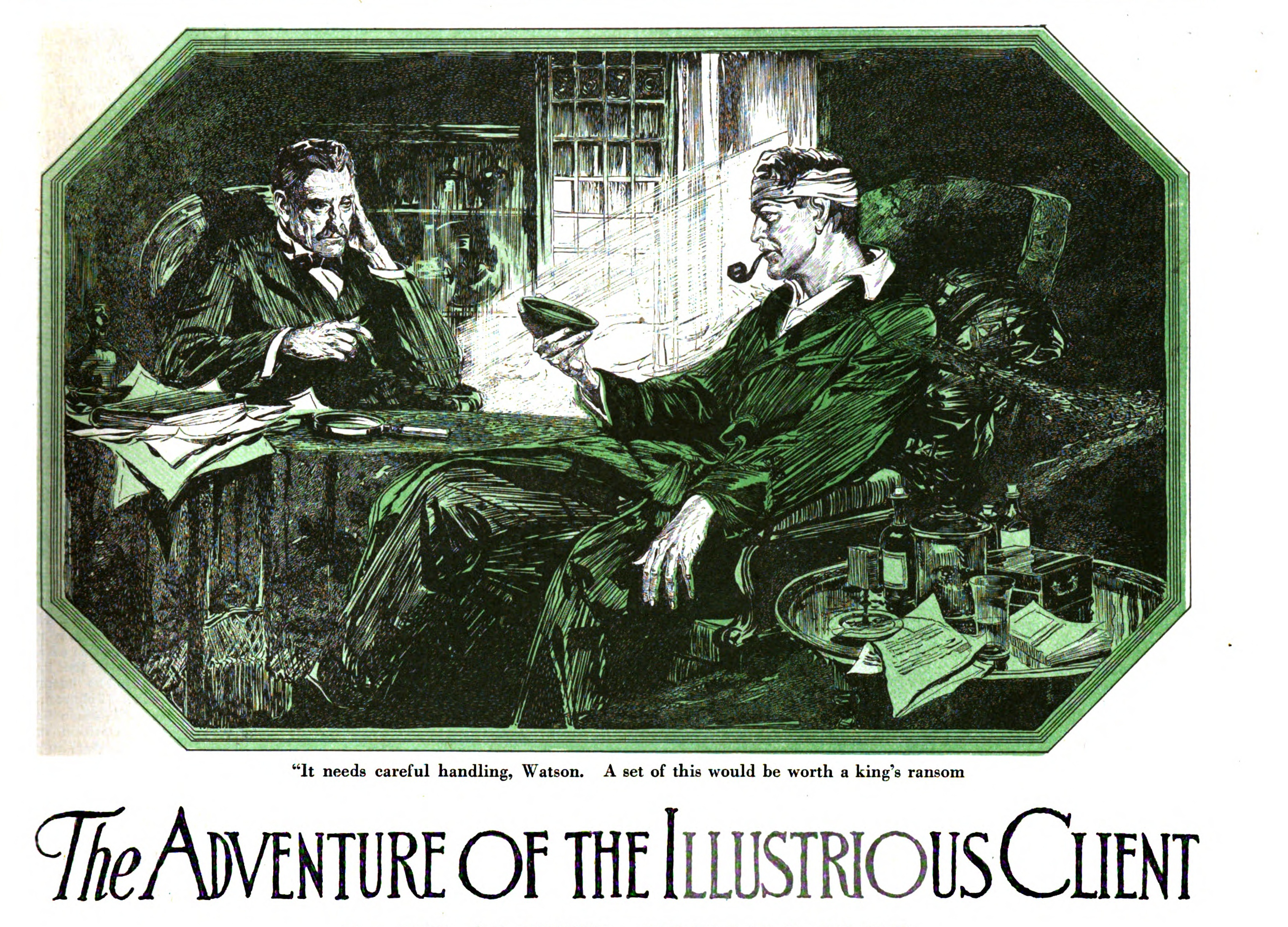
- Title illustration by John Richard Flanagan in Collier's (1924)

Publication
- Publication date: 1924

Chronology
- Series: The Case-Book of Sherlock Holmes
The Three Garridebs	The Three Gables

"The Adventure of the Illustrious Client" (1924) is one of the 56 Sherlock Holmes short stories written by British author Sir Arthur Conan Doyle, and one of the 12 stories collected as The Case-Book of Sherlock Holmes (1927). It was first published in Collier's in the United States in November 1924, and in The Strand Magazine in the United Kingdom in two parts, in February and March 1925.

== Plot ==
Sir James Damery comes to see Holmes and Watson about a problem faced by a client of his, whom he refuses to name and whose connection to the matter at hand must not become public knowledge. General de Merville, a friend of the client, has a young daughter named Violet who has fallen in love with the roguish and sadistic Austrian Baron Adelbert Gruner. Damery and Holmes are convinced that Gruner is a shameless philanderer and a murderer. His victim was his last wife, of whose murder he was acquitted owing to a legal technicality and a witness's untimely death. She met her end in the Splügen Pass. Holmes also finds out that the Baron has expensive tastes and is a collector and a recognised authority on Chinese pottery.

Holmes's first step is to see Gruner, who is amused to see Holmes trying to "play a hand with no cards in it". The Baron will not be moved and claims that his charm is more potent than even a post-hypnotic suggestion in conditioning Violet's mind to reject anything bad that might be said about him. Gruner tells the story of Le Brun, a French agent who was crippled for life after being beaten by thugs after making similar inquiries into the Baron's personal business.

Holmes gets some help with his mission in the form of Shinwell Johnson, a former criminal who now acts as an informer for Holmes in London's underworld. Johnson rakes up Miss Kitty Winter, the Baron's last mistress, who remains bitter at his treatment of her. She is bent on revenge and will do anything to help Holmes. Kitty tells Holmes that the Baron "collects women" and chronicles his conquests in a book. Holmes realises that this book, written in Gruner's own hand, is the key to curing Violet of her devotion to the scoundrel. Kitty tells Holmes that this book is kept in the Baron's study.

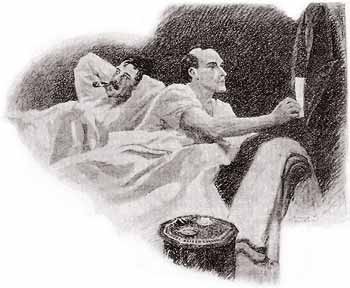
Watson and Holmes at Nevill's Victorian Turkish baths in Northumberland Avenue.

First, Holmes goes to see Violet, bringing Kitty with him, but Violet is proof against Holmes's words. Kitty then makes it clear that Violet might end up ruined, or murdered, by Gruner if she continues. Violet still stands firm, and the meeting ends with Holmes narrowly averting a public scene involving the enraged Kitty.

Later, Holmes is attacked by two of Gruner's men, and the newspapers imply that he is near death. Watson goes to 221B Baker Street, only to discover that Holmes's injuries have been exaggerated to give the impression that he will be out of action for quite a while. Several days later, Holmes is sufficiently recovered to be out of bed. The Baron is planning a trip to the United States just before the wedding, and will be leaving in three days. Holmes knows that Gruner will take his incriminating book with him, never daring to leave it behind in his study.

Holmes orders Watson to learn everything that he can about Chinese pottery in the next 24 hours. The next day, Holmes presents Watson with a fake business card styling him as "Dr. Hill Barton" and an actual piece of Ming pottery, a saucer. He is to go to Baron Gruner's house, pose as a connoisseur of Chinese pottery, and try to sell the saucer. Watson does as Holmes tells him, but cannot fool the Baron for very long, and Gruner soon realises who has sent him.

As Watson faces his murderous captor, a noise from another room alerts the Baron, and he rushes into his study just in time to see Holmes jump out of the window, having stolen the book. The Baron rushes to the window, but Kitty, who has been hiding outside, throws oil of vitriol in his face. Watson applies treatment to his injuries until further assistance comes.

The Baron is now hideously disfigured, but Holmes says even this would not break Violet's attachment. When Violet sees the book of conquests, written in her fiancé's handwriting, she is forced to admit she has been wrong. An announcement in The Morning Post reports the engagement has been called off, and also that vitriol-throwing charges are being pressed against Kitty. Extenuating circumstances reduce her sentence to the lowest possible for such an offence.

Damery's client is never identified by name, but is strongly hinted to be King Edward VII. Watson spots a royal coat of arms on the carriage bearing him away and hurries to tell Holmes, who interrupts by saying that the client is "a loyal friend and a chivalrous gentleman. Let that now and for ever be enough for us."

== Publication history ==
"The Adventure of the Illustrious Client" was first published in the US in Collier's in November 1924, and in the UK in The Strand Magazine in February–March 1925. The story was published in Collier's with four illustrations by John Richard Flanagan, and in the Strand with eight illustrations by Howard K. Elcock. It was included in the short story collection The Case-Book of Sherlock Holmes, which was published in the UK and the US in June 1927.

The original manuscript of the story is now held by the National Library of Scotland, it was formerly in the possession of Jean Conan Doyle.

== Adaptations ==
=== Audio ===
The story was adapted by Edith Meiser as an episode of the American radio series The Adventures of Sherlock Holmes. The episode aired on 23 February 1931, with Richard Gordon as Sherlock Holmes and Leigh Lovell as Dr. Watson. Other dramatisations of the story, likely with the same script or a slightly altered script, also aired in the same series on 8 March 1933 (again with Gordon and Lovell) and 18 April 1936 (with Gordon as Holmes and Harry West as Watson).

Meiser also adapted the story as an episode of the American radio series The New Adventures of Sherlock Holmes that aired on 5 October 1941 (with Basil Rathbone as Holmes and Nigel Bruce as Watson). Another episode adapted from the story aired on 9 May 1948 (with John Stanley as Holmes and Alfred Shirley as Watson).

A radio adaptation aired in 1960 on the BBC Light Programme, as part of the 1952–1969 radio series starring Carleton Hobbs as Holmes and Norman Shelley as Watson. It was adapted by Michael Hardwick.

An audio drama based on the story, starring Robert Hardy as Holmes and Nigel Stock as Watson, was released on LP record in 1971. It was dramatised and produced by Michael Hardwick (who also adapted the 1960 BBC radio version of the same story) and Mollie Hardwick.

"The Illustrious Client" was dramatised for BBC Radio 4 in 1994 by Bert Coules as part of the 1989–1998 radio series starring Clive Merrison as Holmes and Michael Williams as Watson, featuring Michael Feast as Baron Gruner and Ruth Gemmell as Violet de Merville.

In 2010, the story was adapted for radio as part of The Classic Adventures of Sherlock Holmes, a series on the American radio show Imagination Theatre, with John Patrick Lowrie as Holmes and Lawrence Albert as Watson.

In 2023, the podcast Sherlock & Co. adapted the story in a three-episode adventure called "The Illustrious Client", starring Harry Attwell as Sherlock Holmes, Paul Waggott as Dr. John Watson, and Marta da Silva as Mariana "Mrs. Hudson" Ametxazurra.

=== Television ===
In 1965, the story was adapted for an episode of Sherlock Holmes, starring Douglas Wilmer as Holmes, Nigel Stock as Watson, Peter Wyngarde as Baron Grüner and Rosemary Leach as Kitty Winter.

In 1991, the Granada TV version with Jeremy Brett is faithful to the original, except that it shows that Miss Winter's revenge attempt on the Baron was because he had disfigured her neck and chest with oil of vitriol, and in the small detail that Grüner finds Holmes inside the house, and Kitty (played by Kim Thomson) rushes inside and past Holmes to throw the vitriol at Grüner played by Anthony Valentine.

In 2015, Season Three Episode Eleven of the CBS Show, Elementary, Kitty Winter (Ophelia Lovibond) and Adelbert Gruner (Stuart Townsend) are introduced in a mid-season story arc that changes Gruner from a philanderer and a baron to a corporate vice president and serial rapist-murderer. Kitty escaped from his captivity before he was able to kill her. She spends the first half of the season training under Holmes as a detective. When Gruner arrives in New York, she exposes his identity. Violet de Merville is a supporting character, the sister of another suspect who has no connection to Gruner. In this version, Kitty flees the United States to an unstated destination so as to escape arrest after she scarred Gruner's face with a caustic chemical. In a later episode, The View From Olympus, Holmes mentions a previous case about a man who killed his wife on the Splügen Pass and made her murder look like an accident.

In 2025, Gruner is mentioned in the Watson episode "A Variant of Unknown Significance" in which he attempts to buy a sample of the deceased Holmes' DNA from Irene Adler.

== Sources ==
- Cawthorne, Nigel (2011). A Brief History of Sherlock Holmes. Running Press. ISBN 978-0762444083.
- Dickerson, Ian (2019). Sherlock Holmes and His Adventures on American Radio. BearManor Media. ISBN 978-1629335087.
- Smith, Daniel (2014) [2009]. The Sherlock Holmes Companion: An Elementary Guide (Updated ed.). Aurum Press. ISBN 978-1-78131-404-3.
