= The Adventure of the Sussex Vampire =

1924 short story by Arthur Conan Doyle

- Short story by Arthur Conan Doyle
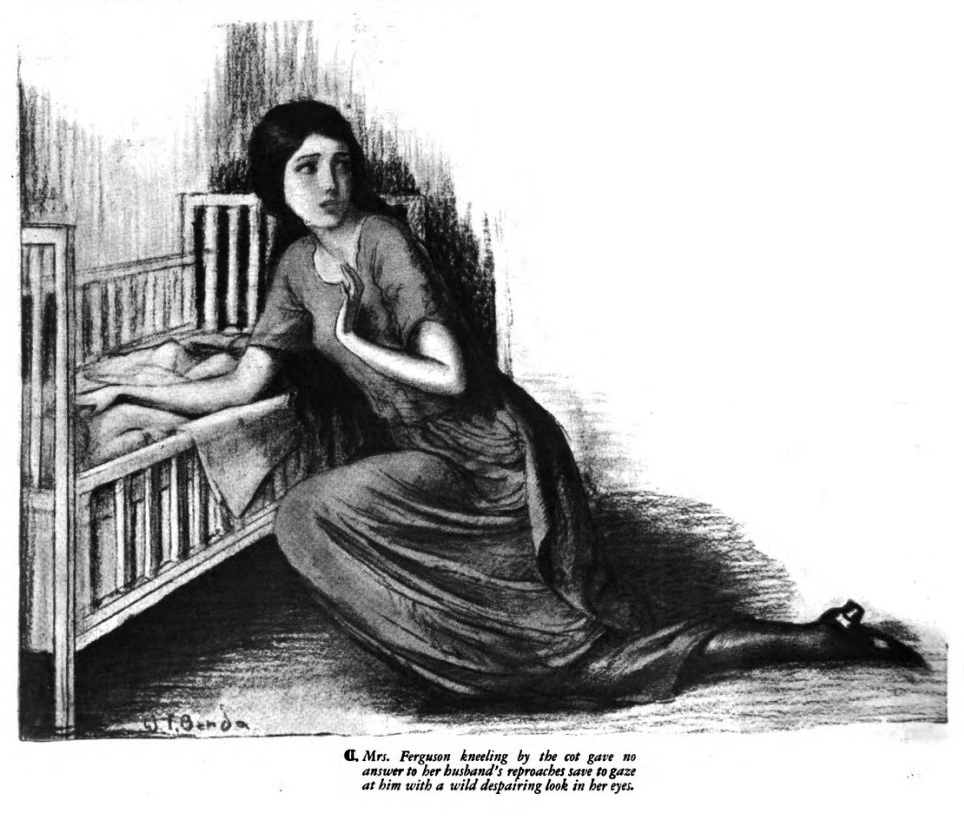
- The alleged "vampire" Mrs. Ferguson, a 1924 illustration by W. T. Benda in Hearst's International.

Publication
- Publication date: 1924

Chronology
- Series: The Case-Book of Sherlock Holmes
The Creeping Man	The Three Garridebs

"The Adventure of the Sussex Vampire", written by British author Arthur Conan Doyle, is one of 12 Sherlock Holmes stories collected between 1921 and 1927 as The Case-Book of Sherlock Holmes. It was first published in the January 1924 issues of The Strand Magazine in London and Hearst's International in New York.

== Plot ==
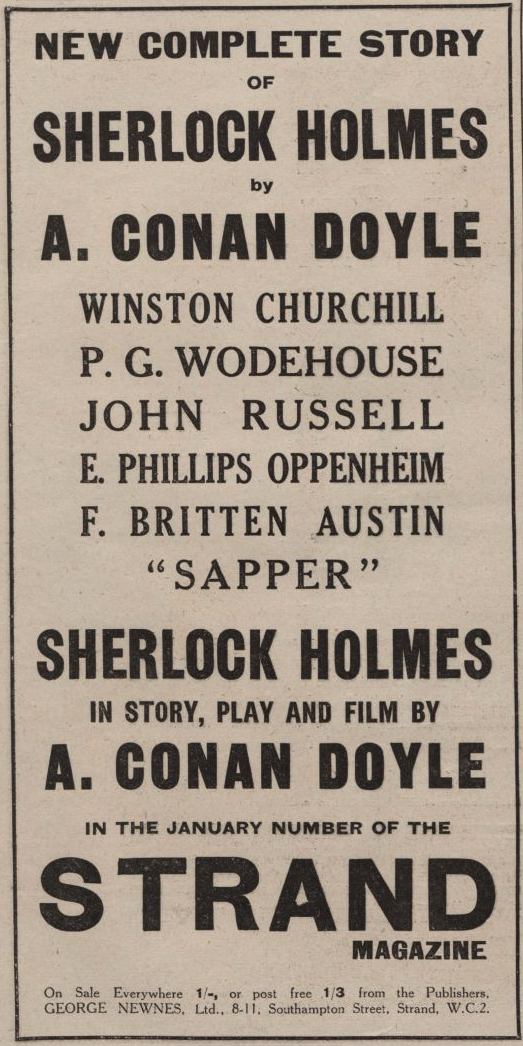
An advert from the 28 December 1923 edition of The Radio Times for the January 1924 edition of The Strand Magazine, leading with the announcement of the "new complete story of Sherlock Holmes by A. Conan Doyle", whose title is not given.

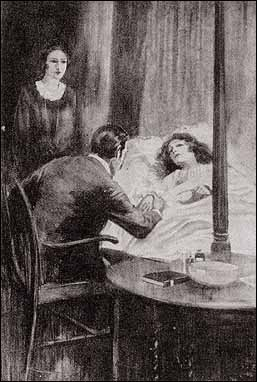
An illustration from Strand Magazine (1924)

Holmes receives an odd letter that makes reference to vampires. Mr. Robert Ferguson, who comes to 221B Baker Street the next morning, has become convinced that his Peruvian second wife has been sucking their baby son's blood. By his first wife, he has a 15-year-old son named Jack, who suffered an unfortunate accident as a child and now, although he can still walk, does not have full use of his legs. Since the start of the bloodsucking, Jack has unaccountably been struck twice by his stepmother, although Mr. Ferguson cannot imagine why. Ever since being found out by her husband, she has locked herself in her room and refused to come out. Only her Peruvian maid, Dolores, is allowed in. She takes Mrs. Ferguson her meals.

Even before Holmes and Watson set off for Mr. Ferguson's house in Sussex, Holmes has worked out what is going on, and it has nothing to do with vampires. Holmes's trip is made simply to observe and confirm what he has already deduced.

Upon their arrival in Sussex, Mrs. Ferguson's maid announces that her mistress is ill, and Dr. Watson offers to help. He finds an agitated woman in the room upstairs – she speaks of all being destroyed, and of sacrificing herself rather than breaking her husband's heart. She also demands her child, who has been with the nurse Mrs. Mason ever since Mr. Ferguson found out about the bloodsucking incidents. Holmes examines the South American weapons displayed in the house and meets the children. While Mr. Ferguson is doting on his younger son, Watson notices that Holmes is gazing at the window. He cannot imagine why his friend is doing this.

Holmes then reveals the truth about what has been happening, much to the relief of Mrs. Ferguson as this is exactly what she has been hoping for: the truth to come from someone else's lips. It turns out that the culprit is Jack, Mr. Ferguson's elder son, who is extremely jealous of his young half-brother. Holmes has confirmed this by looking at Jack's reflection in the window while his father's attention was on the baby. Jack has been attempting to murder his half-brother by shooting poisoned darts at him, and his stepmother's behaviour of sucking the baby's neck is thereby explained: she was sucking the poison out. It also explains why she struck Jack, and why she was sick when Holmes and Watson arrived. The wounds, therefore, were caused by the darts, not by her biting. Mrs. Ferguson had not wanted to be the one to tell her husband what Jack had done.

== Publication history ==
"The Adventure of the Sussex Vampire" was first published in the UK in The Strand Magazine in January 1924, and in the US in Hearst's International (under the title "The Sussex Vampire") in the same month. The story was published with four illustrations by Howard K. Elcock in the Strand, and with four illustrations by W. T. Benda in Hearst's International. It was included in the short story collection The Case-Book of Sherlock Holmes, which was published in the UK and the US in June 1927.

== Adaptations ==
=== Radio and audio dramas ===
The story was adapted by Edith Meiser as an episode of the American radio series The Adventures of Sherlock Holmes. The episode aired on 16 February 1931, with Richard Gordon as Sherlock Holmes and Leigh Lovell as Dr. Watson. The script was used again for an episode that aired on 7 March 1936 (with Gordon as Holmes and Harry West as Watson).

Meiser also adapted the story as an episode of the American radio series The New Adventures of Sherlock Holmes that aired on 2 October 1939 (with Basil Rathbone as Holmes and Nigel Bruce as Watson), and another episode that aired on 14 December 1947 (with John Stanley as Holmes and Alfred Shirley as Watson).

A radio dramatisation of the story adapted by Michael Hardwick aired on the BBC Light Programme in 1964, as part of the 1952–1969 radio series starring Carleton Hobbs as Holmes and Norman Shelley as Watson.

"The Sussex Vampire" was dramatised for BBC Radio 4 in 1994 by Bert Coules as part of the 1989–1998 radio series starring Clive Merrison as Holmes and Michael Williams as Watson. It featured Michael Troughton as Robert Ferguson.

In 2012, the story was adapted for radio as an episode of The Classic Adventures of Sherlock Holmes, a series on the American radio show Imagination Theatre, with John Patrick Lowrie as Holmes and Lawrence Albert as Watson.

=== Television ===
In a 1993 televised adaptation of this case entitled The Last Vampyre, produced by Granada Television and starring Jeremy Brett as Sherlock Holmes, the case was altered. In the televised version, Holmes was called by the town vicar to investigate the death of the Ferguson baby, with the prime suspect being the newly arrived Mr. John Stockton, a man of eccentric behaviour descended from a local family rumoured to be vampires. During this investigation, it is revealed that Jack Ferguson, driven to delusions by the childhood accident which cost him the full use of his legs, has come to believe himself to be a vampire because of the power and fear such a creature inspires. He sees Stockton as a 'mentor' of sorts due to his seemingly vampire-like ability to charm women. The case concludes with Stockton dead in an accident; the villagers digging up Stockton's body and taking it to his family's old, burned-out house; Mrs. Ferguson's sucking blood from her maid's neck to remove poison introduced by Jack; Ferguson attempting to stake Stockton's corpse; and Jack throwing himself from the ruined Stockton house, believing he can fly as part of his delusion. When Holmes and Watson discuss the case as they wait for their train, Holmes suggests that the world may not be prepared for a report of this case.

An episode of the animated television series Sherlock Holmes in the 22nd Century was based on the story. The episode, titled "The Adventure of the Sussex Vampire Lot", first aired in 1999. In this story, Holmes, Watson, Lestrade, and the Baker Street Irregulars investigated a vampire draining data from computers. Also after the vampire is the clone of Professor Moriarty and his creator Fenwick who seek to recruit it to his side. After Moriarty and Fenwick evaded arrest, it is revealed that the vampire is a hacker named Amanda Wheelwright who was interfering with Moriarty's data theft using a vampire holographic avatar and restoring the deleted data when Moriarty wasn't a threat to the data. Holmes persuades Lestrade to have Amanda do community service as Amanda tells Holmes to keep Moriarty out of her life.

The 2018 Japanese television drama Miss Sherlock adapted "The Adventure of the Sussex Vampire" in season 1, episode 4 "The Wakasugi Family", setting it in modern-day Japan. The episode is fairly faithful to the original, but includes a secondary antagonist motivated by revenge.

=== Books ===
It was adapted into one of the books of the Hong Kong children's book series The Great Detective Sherlock Holmes, as "The Mystery of the Vampire" (吸血鬼之謎). It is Book #13 of the original Chinese version, and book #4 of the English version.

The work was adapted a crossover between Young Miss Holmes and Dance in the Vampire Bund.
