= The Adventure of the Lion's Mane =

Sherlock Holmes story told from his fictional retirement

- Short story by Arthur Conan Doyle
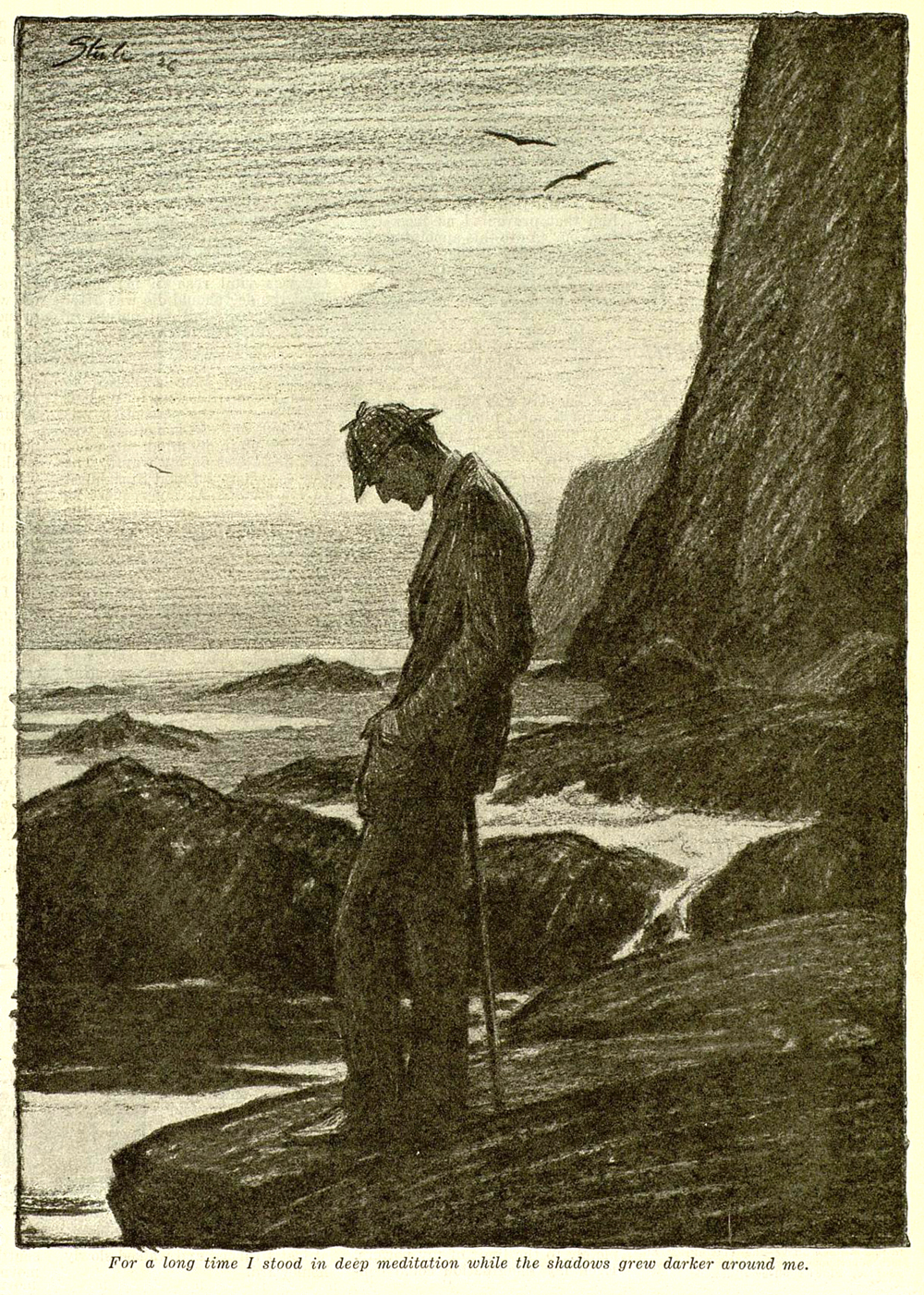
- 1926 illustration by Frederic Dorr Steele in Liberty

Publication
- Publication date: 1926

Chronology
- Series: The Case-Book of Sherlock Holmes
The Blanched Soldier	The Retired Colourman

"The Adventure of the Lion's Mane" (1926), one of the 56 Sherlock Holmes short stories written by British author Sir Arthur Conan Doyle, is one of 12 stories in the cycle collected as The Case-Book of Sherlock Holmes. It is notable for being narrated by Holmes himself, instead of by Dr. Watson (who does not appear in the story).

== Plot ==
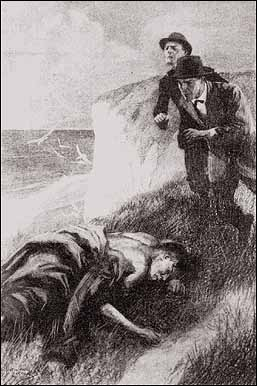
Holmes and Stackhurst find the dying McPherson – 1926 The Strand Magazine illustration by Howard Elcock

In 1907, some time after his retirement to the Sussex Downs, Holmes goes for a walk and meets his friend Harold Stackhurst, headmaster of a local preparatory school called "The Gables". Shortly thereafter, Stackhurst's science teacher, Fitzroy McPherson, staggers up from the nearby beach, dressed in only his overcoat and trousers. He collapses at their feet, and dies shortly thereafter, having managed to scream the words "The Lion's Mane". He has long, narrow welts curving around his body; he appears to have been repeatedly whipped with some sort of thin, flexible scourge, until his weak heart gave out with the pain.

Ian Murdoch, the morose mathematics teacher at the Gables, arrives on the scene, having just finished teaching an algebra class. Holmes sends him to find the police, then examines the nearby bathing pool, which had been created by unusually high tides after a recent series of gales from the south. Holmes finds McPherson's dry, folded towel, and concludes he had not yet been in the water. There are people far down the beach, and some fishing boats out at sea, but none are close enough to have had anything to do with the tragedy. The police arrive, but a search of the surrounding caves reveals no clues.

Ian Murdoch, due to his temper, is a possible suspect; he once threw McPherson's Airedale Terrier through a window. However, Stackhurst insists the two men were friends. A note in McPherson's pocket suggests someone named "Maudie" had an appointment to meet him, so Stackhurst and Holmes go to the house of Maud Bellamy, the daughter of a wealthy sailor-turned-businessman. As they arrive, Murdoch passes them, having just left Maud's house. When Murdoch refuses to tell Stackhurst what he was doing there, the conversation escalates into a sharp argument, and Stackhurst gives Murdoch notice. Inside the house, Maud's unpleasant father and brother reveal that they both disliked McPherson as being below their station. However, Maud explains that she and McPherson were secretly engaged, and often agreed to meet in private. She also admits that Murdoch is a former admirer of hers, causing Holmes and Stackhurst to believe he may have killed McPherson out of jealousy.

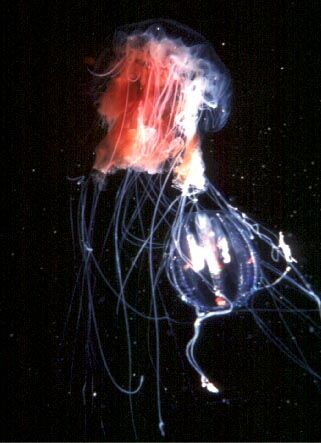
A Lion's Mane jellyfish capturing a sea gooseberry.

Days later, the inquest is adjourned due to lack of evidence. Murdoch's rooms are searched, in vain. Later, McPherson's dog is found dead on the same beach its master died on, a look of extreme pain on its face. This, and the memory of the dying man's last words, triggers Holmes to start a new line of inquiry, and he begins to dig through his old books. Inspector Bardle of the Sussex Constabulary visits, and asks if he should arrest Murdoch, but Holmes points out that Murdoch has an alibi. Suddenly, Murdoch and Stackhurst burst in, the former in great pain and with his torso covered in the same curving welts McPherson had. After treating Murdoch with brandy, and applying salad oil to the wounds, Holmes leads Stackhurst and Bardle back to the bathing pool. After some intense searching, he finds what he was looking for; a Cyanea capillata, or lion's-mane jellyfish, which has been washed into the pool by the recent gales. The three men promptly crush it beneath a boulder, killing it.

Murdoch, once recovered, explains that he was swimming when the creature stung him, though he only felt it and did not see it. Being a man in normal health, he has survived the encounter. Holmes shows the group a book by John George Wood, detailing the author's own painful encounter with a Cyanea. The book's accurate description of the jellyfish stings had put Holmes on the right trail; he had initially failed to consider a sea creature the culprit, because he had mistakenly assumed McPherson never entered the water. In reality, McPherson had simply been in too much pain to towel himself. The dog, pining and looking for its dead master, had entered the pool, and unintentionally shared McPherson's fate.

Murdoch explains that, while he had feelings for Maud, he had never acted on them, out of respect for his friend McPherson. Murdoch was, in fact, the secret deliverer of all the messages between his friend and Maud. Stackhurst and Murdoch make up their quarrel, and leave the cottage arm in arm.

== Commentary ==
This is one of only two stories by Sir Arthur Conan Doyle to be narrated by Sherlock Holmes himself instead of Dr Watson. The other story is "The Adventure of the Blanched Soldier".

According to Owen Dudley Edwards, the original manuscript of the story indicates that Doyle initially planned to have Holmes chronicle his own defeat. The solution to the case given by Holmes in the final version was originally provided by a naturalist called Dr Mordhouse. This aspect was ultimately removed and Dr Mordhouse does not appear in the final version.

== Publication history ==
"The Adventure of the Lion's Mane" was first published in the US in Liberty in November 1926, and in the UK in The Strand Magazine in December 1926. The story was published with seven illustrations by Frederic Dorr Steele in Liberty, and with three illustrations by Howard K. Elcock in the Strand. It was included in the short story collection The Case-Book of Sherlock Holmes, which was published in the UK and the US in June 1927.

A facsimile of the original manuscript was published in 1992 by Westminster Libraries and The Sherlock Holmes Society of London.

== Adaptations ==
=== Radio and audio dramas ===
The story was adapted by Edith Meiser in 1931 as an episode of the American radio series The Adventures of Sherlock Holmes. The episode aired on 23 March 1931, with Richard Gordon as Sherlock Holmes and Leigh Lovell as Dr. Watson. Another dramatisation of the story adapted by Meiser aired on 1 August 1936 (with Gordon as Holmes and Harry West as Watson).

Meiser also adapted the story as episodes of the American radio series The New Adventures of Sherlock Holmes that aired on 13 November 1939 and 25 January 1942 (with Basil Rathbone as Holmes and Nigel Bruce as Watson). In an adaptation of "The Adventure of the Lion's Mane" that aired on 21 April 1947, Tom Conway played Holmes with Bruce as Watson.

A radio adaptation of the story aired in 1969 on BBC Radio 2, as part of the 1952–1969 radio series starring Carleton Hobbs as Sherlock Holmes and Norman Shelley as Dr Watson. It was dramatised by Michael Hardwick.

"The Lion's Mane" was dramatised for BBC Radio 4 in 1994 by Bert Coules as part of the 1989–1998 radio series starring Clive Merrison as Holmes and Michael Williams as Watson.

In 2009, the story was adapted for radio by M.J. Elliott as part of The Classic Adventures of Sherlock Holmes, a series on the American radio show Imagination Theatre, starring John Patrick Lowrie as Holmes and Lawrence Albert as Watson.

In 2024, the podcast Sherlock & Co. adapted the story in a three-episode adventure called "The Lion's Mane", starring Harry Attwell as Holmes and Paul Waggott as Watson. In it, Fitzroy McPherson is instead a scuba diver and employee for Belamy's Barnacles, a seafood supplier that makes up the vast majority of the economy on the island of Fjara. It is eventually discovered that, contrary to their organic farming claims, Belamy's Barancles has been using copious amounts of fertilizer to illegally farm their seafood using a series of pipes which run under Fjara's bay. The leak of one such pipe had caused a toxic algal bloom, leading to the death of much of the marine life in the bay and an explosion in the local population of lion's mane jellyfish, whose sheer numbers, size, and stinging tentacles ultimately led to the death of McPherson when he attempted to fix the broken pipe.

=== Television ===
"The Lion's Mane" was indirectly referenced in the BBC adaptation Sherlock in "The Six Thatchers", where Sherlock and John, while solving cases, jokingly comment on the stupidity of arresting a jellyfish. In the CBS adaptation Elementary, in the introduction of The Geek Interpreter, Sherlock briefly reports solving the 1926 cold case death of Fitzroy McPherson, identifying the Lion's Mane jellyfish as the culprit.

== Sources ==
- Cawthorne, Nigel (2011). A Brief History of Sherlock Holmes. Running Press. ISBN 978-0762444083.
- Dickerson, Ian (2019). Sherlock Holmes and His Adventures on American Radio. BearManor Media. ISBN 978-1629335087.
- Smith, Daniel (2014) [2009]. The Sherlock Holmes Companion: An Elementary Guide (Updated ed.). Aurum Press. ISBN 978-1-78131-404-3.
