= The Problem of Thor Bridge =

- Short story by Arthur Conan Doyle
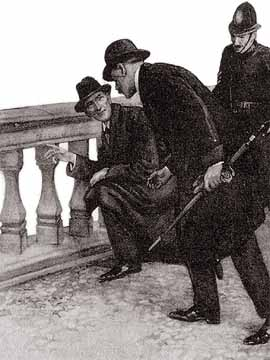
- 1922 illustration by Alfred Gilbert in The Strand Magazine.

Publication
- Publication date: February–March 1922

Chronology
- Series: The Casebook of Sherlock Holmes
The Mazarin Stone	The Creeping Man

"The Problem of Thor Bridge" is a Sherlock Holmes short story by Arthur Conan Doyle collected in The Case-Book of Sherlock Holmes (1927). It was first published in 1922 in The Strand Magazine (UK) and Hearst's International (US).

== Plot ==
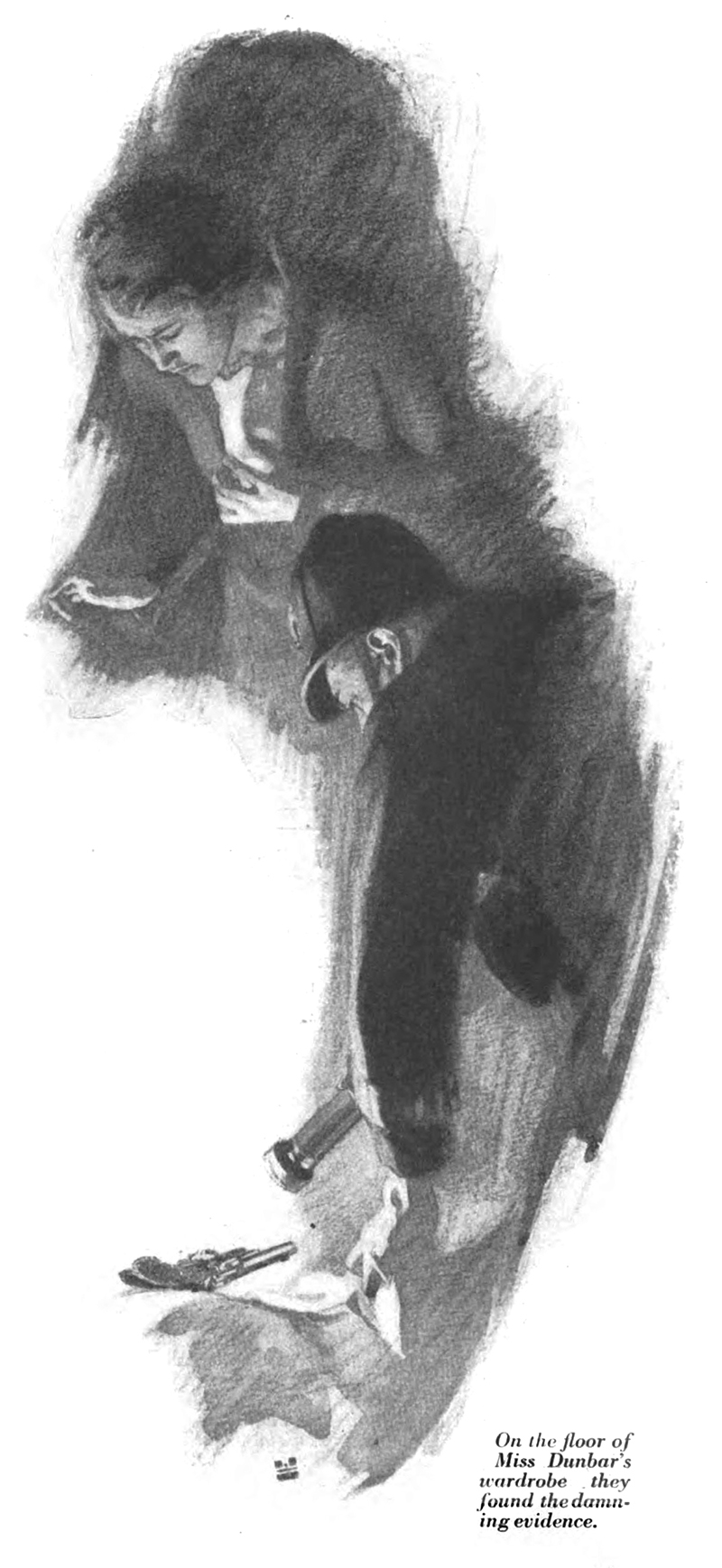
1922 illustration by G. Patrick Nelson in Hearst's International

Neil Gibson, the Gold King and former senator from "some Western state", approaches Sherlock Holmes to investigate the murder of his wife Maria in order to clear his children's governess, Grace Dunbar, of the crime. It soon emerges that Mr Gibson's marriage had been unhappy and he treated his wife very badly. He had fallen in love with her when he met her in Brazil, but soon realised they had nothing in common. He became attracted to Miss Dunbar; since he could not marry her, he had attempted to please her in other ways, such as trying to help people less fortunate than himself.

Maria Gibson was found lying in a pool of blood on Thor Bridge with a bullet through the head and note from the governess, agreeing to a meeting at that location, in her hand. A recently discharged revolver with one shot fired is found in Miss Dunbar's wardrobe. Holmes agrees to look at the situation in spite of the damning evidence.

From the outset, Holmes observes some rather odd things about the case. How could Miss Dunbar so coolly and rationally have planned and carried out the murder and then carelessly tossed the murder weapon into her wardrobe? What was the strange chip on the underside of the bridge's stone balustrade? Why was Mrs Gibson clutching the note from Miss Dunbar when she died? If the murder weapon was one of a matched pair of pistols, why couldn't the other one be found in Mr Gibson's collection?

Holmes uses his powers of deduction to solve the crime, and demonstrates, using Watson's revolver, how it was perpetrated: Mrs Gibson, outraged and jealous of Miss Dunbar's relationship with her husband, resolved to end her own life and frame her rival for the crime. After arranging a meeting with Miss Dunbar, requesting her to leave her response in a note, Mrs Gibson tied a rock on a piece of string to the end of a revolver, and shot herself, the rock pulling the revolver over the side of the bridge; the revolver found in Miss Dunbar's wardrobe was the other pistol of the pair, which had been fired off in the woods earlier, and the chip in the bridge was caused by the pistol hitting the stonework as it was pulled off by the rock. Holmes's reconstruction reproduces the damage to the balustrade of the bridge. He asks the police to drag the lake for the revolvers of Watson and Gibson.

== Commentary ==
The story is notable within the Sherlock Holmes canon for the initial reference to a tin dispatchbox, located within the vaults of the Cox and Co. Bank at Charing Cross in London, where Dr. Watson kept the papers concerning some of Holmes' unsolved or unfinished cases. According to Watson: "Among these unfinished tales is that of Mr. James Phillimore, who, stepping back into his own house to get his umbrella, was never more seen in this world". The unknown fate of Phillimore has been a subject for many subsequent stories including: The Disappearance of Mr. James Phillimore by Ellery Queen; The Adventure of the Highgate Miracle by Adrian Conan Doyle and John Dickson Carr; The Enigma of the Warwickshire Vortex by F. Gwynplaine MacIntyre; The Problem of the Sore Bridge by Philip José Farmer; one episode of the Italian comic book series Storie di Altrove (a spin-off from the more famous Martin Mystère); Bert Coules's BBC Radio adaptation The Singular Inheritance of Miss Gloria Wilson from The Further Adventures of Sherlock Holmes; and two books by Marvin Kaye, The Incredible Umbrella (Doubleday, 1979) and The Amorous Umbrella (Doubleday, 1981). Also mentioned are the case of Isadora Persano, "who was found stark staring mad with a match box in front of him which contained a remarkable worm said to be unknown to science" and that of the cutter Alicia, "which sailed one spring morning into a small patch of mist from where she never again emerged".

== Publication history ==
"The Problem of Thor Bridge" was published in the UK in The Strand Magazine in two parts in February and March 1922, and in the US in Hearst's International in the same months. The story was published with seven illustrations by A. Gilbert in the Strand, and with six illustrations by G. Patrick Nelson in Hearst's International. It was included in the short story collection The Case-Book of Sherlock Holmes, which was published in the UK and the US in June 1927.

== Adaptations ==
=== Film and television ===
"The Problem of Thor Bridge" was adapted as a short silent film titled The Mystery of Thor Bridge in 1923 as part of the Sherlock Holmes film series by Stoll Pictures. It starred Eille Norwood as Sherlock Holmes and Hubert Willis as Dr. Watson.

The story was adapted for the Sherlock Holmes 1968 BBC series with Peter Cushing, but the episode is now lost.

The story was also dramatised in 1991 in Granada TV's series Sherlock Holmes starring Jeremy Brett with Daniel Massey as Neil Gibson, Celia Gregory as Maria Gibson, and Catherine Russell as Grace Dunbar.

A similar framing method is used in Murder, She Wrote, Season 8, Episode 17 (1992) "To the Last Will I Grapple with Thee".

In the 2005 CSI: Crime Scene Investigation episode "Who Shot Sherlock?" (Season 5, Episode 11), the method of killing was mostly similar, with changes including the chip coming off the gun instead of the stonework (of a fireplace). But rather than a suicide staged to frame one of the suspects, it turned out another suspect had staged the death.

The professor in Elementary, Season 1, Episode 9 (2012), has the same motive as Mrs Gibson and a similar framing method. The same cause of death deduced by Holmes in this story is used in the opening sequence of the same series, Season 2, Episode 9 (2013), with the same intent of throwing suspicion on to another party.

=== Audio ===
"The Problem of Thor Bridge" was adapted by Edith Meiser as an episode of the American radio series The Adventures of Sherlock Holmes. The episode aired on 16 March 1931, with Richard Gordon as Sherlock Holmes and Leigh Lovell as Dr. Watson. Another radio dramatisation of the story aired on 13 June 1936 (with Gordon as Holmes and Harry West as Watson).

Meiser also adapted the story for the American radio series The New Adventures of Sherlock Holmes as an episode that aired on 3 November 1940. Another adaptation of the story aired on 1 October 1945. Both episodes starred Basil Rathbone as Holmes and Nigel Bruce as Watson.

A radio adaptation titled "Thor Bridge" aired in 1962 on the BBC Light Programme, as part of the 1952–1969 radio series starring Carleton Hobbs as Holmes and Norman Shelley as Watson. It was dramatised by Michael Hardwick. Robert Ayres played J. Neil Gibson.

"The Problem of Thor Bridge" was dramatised for BBC Radio 4 in 1994 by Bert Coules as part of the 1989–1998 radio series starring Clive Merrison as Holmes and Michael Williams as Watson, featuring William Hootkins as J. Neil Gibson.

In 2012, the story was adapted for radio as part of The Classic Adventures of Sherlock Holmes, a series on the American radio show Imagination Theatre, with John Patrick Lowrie as Holmes and Lawrence Albert as Watson.

In 2023, the podcast Sherlock & Co. adapted the story in a two-episode adventure called "The Problem of Thor Bridge", starring Harry Attwell as Sherlock Holmes, Paul Waggott as Dr. John Watson and Marta da Silva as Mariana "Mrs. Hudson" Ametxazurra.

=== Literature ===
The Problem of Three-Toll Bridge by fantasy author Josh Reynolds, featuring sage-detective Zavant Konniger and his halfling manservant Vido, was published 2012 in issue 25 of Warhammer Fantasy magazine Hammer and Bolter.

== Bibliography ==
- Cawthorne, Nigel (2011). A Brief History of Sherlock Holmes. Running Press. ISBN 978-0762444083.
- Dickerson, Ian (2019). Sherlock Holmes and His Adventures on American Radio. BearManor Media. ISBN 978-1629335087.
- Smith, Daniel (2014) [2009]. The Sherlock Holmes Companion: An Elementary Guide (Updated ed.). Aurum Press. ISBN 978-1-78131-404-3.
