= The Adventure of the Retired Colourman =

- Short story by Arthur Conan Doyle
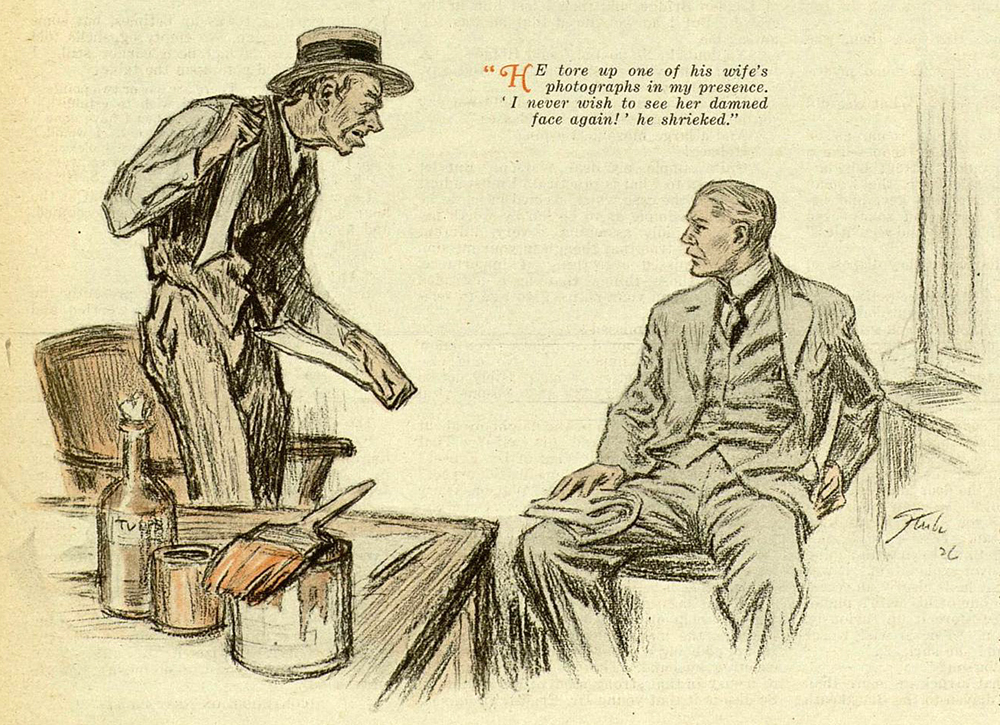
- 1926 illustration by Frederic Dorr Steele

Text available at Wikisource

Publication
- Publication date: 1926

Chronology
- Series: The Case-Book of Sherlock Holmes
The Lion's Mane	The Veiled Lodger

"The Adventure of the Retired Colourman" (1926), one of the 56 Sherlock Holmes short stories written by British author Sir Arthur Conan Doyle, is one of 12 stories in the cycle collected as The Case-Book of Sherlock Holmes.

== Plot ==
Sherlock Holmes is hired by a retired art supply dealer from Lewisham, Josiah Amberley, to look into his young wife's disappearance. She has left with a neighbour, Dr Ray Ernest, taking a sizeable quantity of cash and securities. Amberley wants the two tracked down.

Holmes is too busy with another case at the moment, so he sends Dr Watson to Lewisham to observe what he can, although Watson is keenly aware that this is more Holmes's province. He does his best, observing that Amberley is busy painting his house, which seems a bit odd. He even sees Amberley's wife's unused theatre ticket; she and her young man disappeared while Amberley went to the theatre alone after his wife complained of a headache. Watson notes the seat number.

Watson also sees Amberley's strongroom from which his wife had taken the valuables. She, apparently, had a key of her own. He meets a lounger with a rather military appearance in the street, and later observes him running to catch the train at Blackheath Station as he is returning to 221B Baker Street. Holmes recognises the description; it is his rival in detection, Barker. It later turns out that Ray Ernest's family has hired him to find the missing doctor.

A number of other things about Amberley are obvious. He is a miser, and as such is quite a jealous man. He is an avid chess player (indeed, so is Ernest, which is how they became acquainted), suggesting to Holmes that he also has a scheming mind.

Holmes suspects something, and so sends Watson and Amberley on a fool's errand to the remote village of Little Purlington, near Frinton in Essex, just to keep Amberley out of the way while Holmes breaks into his house to investigate it. He is "caught" by Barker, but they decide to work together.

They reach a conclusion, and later Holmes confronts Amberley with the dramatic question "What did you do with the bodies?" Holmes manhandles Amberley just in time to stop him taking a poison pill. Amberley is obviously guilty.

Holmes explains how he reached his conclusion. Amberley's alibi fell apart when Holmes discovered that his seat at the Haymarket Theatre had not been occupied on the night in question, its number deduced from the ticket that Watson had seen. Also, the painting was a clue. Holmes realised that it was being done to mask a smell, and he soon discovered what that was: gas. He found a gas pipe leading into the strongroom with a tap outside. Amberley had lured his wife and her lover—for so he had believed Dr Ernest to be—into the strongroom, locked them in, and turned the gas on, killing them out of jealousy. He had simply hidden the "stolen" valuables somewhere. In indelible pencil, one of the victims wrote "We we…", perhaps meaning to write "We were murdered." Amberley apparently had not noticed this, and hired Holmes out of "pure swank", believing that no-one would ever find him out.

The bodies are found in a disused well in the garden, hidden under a dog kennel, just where Holmes suggested that the police look. Holmes believes that Amberley will likely end up at Broadmoor rather than on the scaffold, owing to his mental state.

== Publication history ==
"The Adventure of the Retired Colourman" was first published in the US in Liberty in December 1926. It was published in the UK in The Strand Magazine in January 1927. The story was published with four illustrations by Frederic Dorr Steele in Liberty, and with five illustrations by Frank Wiles in the Strand. It was included in The Case-Book of Sherlock Holmes.

== Adaptations ==
=== Radio and audio dramas ===
The story was adapted by Edith Meiser in 1931 as an episode of the American radio series The Adventures of Sherlock Holmes. It aired on 6 April 1931, with Richard Gordon as Sherlock Holmes and Leigh Lovell as Dr Watson.

Meiser was also a writer for the American radio series The New Adventures of Sherlock Holmes, which aired two episodes based on the story, on 11 March 1940 and 3 September 1943 respectively. Basil Rathbone played Holmes and Nigel Bruce played Watson.

A radio adaptation by Michael Hardwick of "The Retired Colourman" aired in 1964 on the BBC Light Programme, as part of the 1952–1969 radio series starring Carleton Hobbs as Sherlock Holmes and Norman Shelley as Dr Watson.

"The Retired Colourman" was dramatised for BBC Radio 4 in 1994 by Bert Coules as part of the 1989–1998 radio series starring Clive Merrison as Holmes and Michael Williams as Watson. It featured Stephen Thorne as Inspector Lestrade, George Cole as Josiah Amberley, and Natasha Pyne as Mrs Amberley. In this version, Holmes is implied to have retired and left Baker Street unceremoniously immediately afterwards, feeling that he has lost a step and that it is "time for the country, and for solitude, and for thought, and for my bees."

In 2009, the story was adapted for radio by M J Elliott as an episode of The Classic Adventures of Sherlock Holmes, a series on the American radio show Imagination Theatre, with John Patrick Lowrie as Holmes and Lawrence Albert as Watson.

In 2024, the podcast Sherlock & Co. adapted the story in a two-episodes adventure called "The retired Colourman", starring Harry Attwell as Holmes and Paul Waggott as Watson.

=== Television ===
The story was adapted as an episode of the 1965 BBC television series Sherlock Holmes starring Douglas Wilmer as Holmes, Nigel Stock as Watson and Maurice Denham as Josiah Amberley. The only difference is that Inspector Mackinnon is replaced by Inspector Lestrade (Peter Madden).

== Bibliography ==
- Cawthorne, Nigel (2011). A Brief History of Sherlock Holmes. Running Press. ISBN 978-0762444083.
- Dickerson, Ian (2019). Sherlock Holmes and His Adventures on American Radio. BearManor Media. ISBN 978-1629335087.
- Smith, Daniel (2014) [2009]. The Sherlock Holmes Companion: An Elementary Guide (Updated ed.). Aurum Press. ISBN 978-1-78131-404-3.
