= The Adventure of the Blue Carbuncle =

1892 short story by Arthur Conan Doyle

- Short story by Sir Arthur Conan Doyle
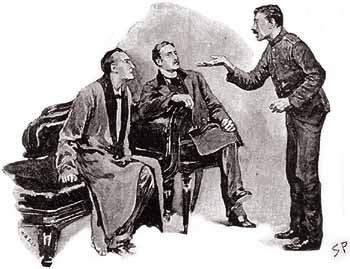
- Peterson shows Holmes and Watson the surprising item found inside the goose, 1892 illustration by Sidney Paget

Text available at Wikisource
- Country: United Kingdom
- Language: English
- Genre: Detective fiction short stories

Publication
- Published in: Strand Magazine
- Publication date: January 1892

Chronology
- Series: The Adventures of Sherlock Holmes
The Man with the Twisted Lip	The Adventure of the Speckled Band

"The Adventure of the Blue Carbuncle" is one of 56 short Sherlock Holmes stories written by Sir Arthur Conan Doyle, the seventh story of twelve in the collection The Adventures of Sherlock Holmes. It was first published in The Strand Magazine in January 1892.

== Plot ==
As London prepares for Christmas, newspapers report the theft of a near-priceless gemstone, the "Blue Carbuncle", from the Countess of Morcar's hotel suite. The police arrest John Horner, a plumber with a criminal record who was in the Countess's room repairing a fireplace grate.

Meanwhile, at 221B Baker Street, Dr Watson finds Sherlock Holmes contemplating a battered old hat brought to him by Peterson, a commissionaire who seeks Holmes's help in returning it and a Christmas goose to their rightful owners after he found them the previous night in the street after a scuffle. A tag on the goose reading "For Mrs Henry Baker" is of little assistance, as the name is a very common one. Ultimately, Peterson takes the goose home for dinner and Holmes keeps the hat to study as an intellectual exercise, deducing Baker's age, social standing, intellect, and domestic status.

An excited Peterson bursts in, having found the stolen gem in the goose's crop. That evening when Baker appears in response to advertisements placed by Holmes in the London newspapers, Holmes returns his hat and offers him a new goose, which he happily accepts. Baker's refusal to take the original bird's entrails leads Holmes to believe that he knew nothing of the theft and that he has been truthful in his claim of having purchased the goose at a pub.

Holmes and Watson visit the pub, whose proprietor states that he bought the goose and several others from a dealer in Covent Garden. However, the dealer refuses to help, complaining that he has been repeatedly pestered by another man about geese he sold to the pub. Realising that he is not the only one aware of the goose's importance, Holmes tricks the dealer into revealing that it was supplied to him by its breeder, a Mrs Oakshott of Brixton. The pestering man visits the stall and identifies himself to Holmes as James Ryder, head attendant at the hotel from which the gem was stolen, who had testified that he found it missing.

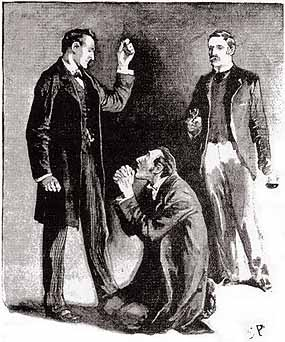
James Ryder imploring Holmes' mercy

Upon being taken to Baker Street and shown the gem, a remorseful Ryder admits that he and his accomplice, the Countess's maid, had contrived to steal it and frame Horner, whose criminal past would make him an easy scapegoat. During a visit to his sister, Mrs Oakshott, Ryder had concealed the gem by feeding it to a goose she had promised him as a gift, but confused the bird with another. By the time he realised his mistake, his goose had already been sold. As it is Christmas, Holmes takes pity on Ryder and allows him to flee the country, concluding that the man is too frightened by what happened to offend again. Holmes is confident that the case against Horner will be dismissed for lack of evidence once Ryder fails to appear in court as a prosecution witness.

== Publication history ==
"The Adventure of the Blue Carbuncle" was first published with eight illustrations by Sidney Paget in The Strand Magazine in January 1892, and in the US edition of the Strand in February 1892. It was also included in the short story collection The Adventures of Sherlock Holmes published in October 1892.

== Adaptations ==
=== Film and television ===
A silent short film based on the story was released in 1923 as part of the Stoll film series starring Eille Norwood as Sherlock Holmes.

Peter Cushing portrayed Sherlock Holmes in the 1968 BBC series. "The Adventure of Blue Carbuncle" is one of only six surviving episodes.

Algimantas Masiulis played Sherlock Holmes in a 1980 television film adaptation of the story by Belarusfilm, directed by Nikolai Lukyanov.

In 1984, the story was adapted by John Hawkesworth and Paul Finney as an episode of the Granada TV series, directed by David Carson and starring Jeremy Brett as Sherlock Holmes and David Burke as Dr. Watson.

The animated television series Sherlock Holmes in the 22nd Century featured an adaptation of the story, replacing the goose with a blue stuffed toy called "Carbuncle" and the stone with a microprocessor.

=== Audio ===
Edith Meiser adapted "The Adventure of the Blue Carbuncle" as an episode of the radio series The Adventures of Sherlock Holmes, which aired on 28 December 1932 (with Richard Gordon as Sherlock Holmes and Leigh Lovell as Dr John Watson). Meiser also adapted the story as an episode for the radio series The New Adventures of Sherlock Holmes that aired on 4 January 1940 (with Basil Rathbone as Holmes and Nigel Bruce as Watson). Another adaptation of the story aired on 25 December 1944 (again starring Rathbone and Bruce, and with Eric Snowden as Peterson). An adaptation written by Howard Merrill aired on 26 December 1948 (with John Stanley as Holmes and Wendell Holmes as Watson).

A radio adaptation by Felix Felton was broadcast on the BBC Home Service on 10 December 1952, as part of the 1952–1969 radio series starring Carleton Hobbs as Holmes and Norman Shelley as Watson. Other adaptations of the story in the same series aired on the BBC Home Service on 25 October 1957 (using the Felton adaptation) and on the BBC Light Programme on 25 December 1961 (adapted by Michael Hardwick) (repeated on the BBC Home Service on 20 December 1962).

A BBC adaptation by John Keir Cross broadcast on the BBC Light Programme on 14 December 1954 starred John Gielgud as Holmes and Ralph Richardson as Watson. The production first aired on the BBC Light Programme on 14 December 1954, and also aired on NBC on 13 March 1955.

On 17 January 1961, "Den Forsvunne Gåsesteken (The Lost Goose)", adapted by Gunnar Lie and directed by Barthold Halle, was broadcast on Norwegian radio with Erling Lindahl as Holmes and Einar Vaage as Watson.

An audio drama based on the story was released in 1970 on LP record, as one of several dramas starring Robert Hardy as Holmes and Nigel Stock as Watson. It was dramatised and produced by Michael Hardwick (who adapted the 1961 radio adaptation) and Mollie Hardwick.

On 26 November 1976, "Błękitny brylant księżnej Morcar (The Blue Carbuncle)", adapted by Robert Dlugoborski & Krzysztof Adamski and directed by Zofia Rakowiecka & Rena Tomaszewska, was broadcast on Polish radio with Piotr Fronczewski as Holmes and Jerzy Tkaczyk as Watson.

"The Adventure of the Blue Carbuncle" was adapted by Murray Burnett as an episode of CBS Radio Mystery Theater featuring Kevin McCarthy as Holmes and Court Benson as Watson. The episode first aired on 25 July 1977.

A radio production adapted by Bill Morrison aired on 23 July 1978, with Barry Foster as Holmes and David Buck as Watson, as the 8th of 13 Holmes stories adapted for BBC Radio 4.

A BBC radio adaptation aired on 2 January 1991, as part of the 1989–1998 radio series starring Clive Merrison as Holmes and Michael Williams as Watson. The episode was adapted by Bert Coules, and featured Peter Blythe as James Ryder, Ben Onwukwe as John Horner, and Christopher Good as Peterson.

An episode of the radio series The Classic Adventures of Sherlock Holmes was adapted from the story by M.J. Elliot. Starring John Patrick Lowrie as Holmes and Lawrence Albert as Watson, the episode aired on 28 December 2008.

In 2023, the podcast Sherlock & Co. adapted the story in a two-episode adventure called "The Blue Carbuncle", starring Harry Attwell as Holmes, Paul Waggott as Watson and Marta da Silva as Mariana "Mrs. Hudson" Ametxazurra.

- In 2025, Paul Waggott from Sherlock & Co. podcast reprised his role as John Watson redoing the story in its original text from 1892's The Adventures of Sherlock Holmes as an Audiobook, from Watson's first person perspective.

=== Books ===
The story was adapted into one of the books of the Hong Kong children's book series The Great Detective Sherlock Holmes, as "The Fat Goose and Blue Carbuncle" (肥鵝與藍寶石). It is Book #3 of the original Chinese version, and book #6 of the English version.

== See also ==
- List of Christmas-themed literature

== Bibliography ==
- Cawthorne, Nigel (2011). A Brief History of Sherlock Holmes. Running Press. ISBN 978-0762444083.
- Dickerson, Ian (2019). Sherlock Holmes and His Adventures on American Radio. BearManor Media. ISBN 978-1629335087.
- Smith, Daniel (2014) [2009]. The Sherlock Holmes Companion: An Elementary Guide (Updated ed.). Aurum Press. ISBN 978-1-78131-404-3.
