= The Adventure of Shoscombe Old Place =

- Short story by Arthur Conan Doyle
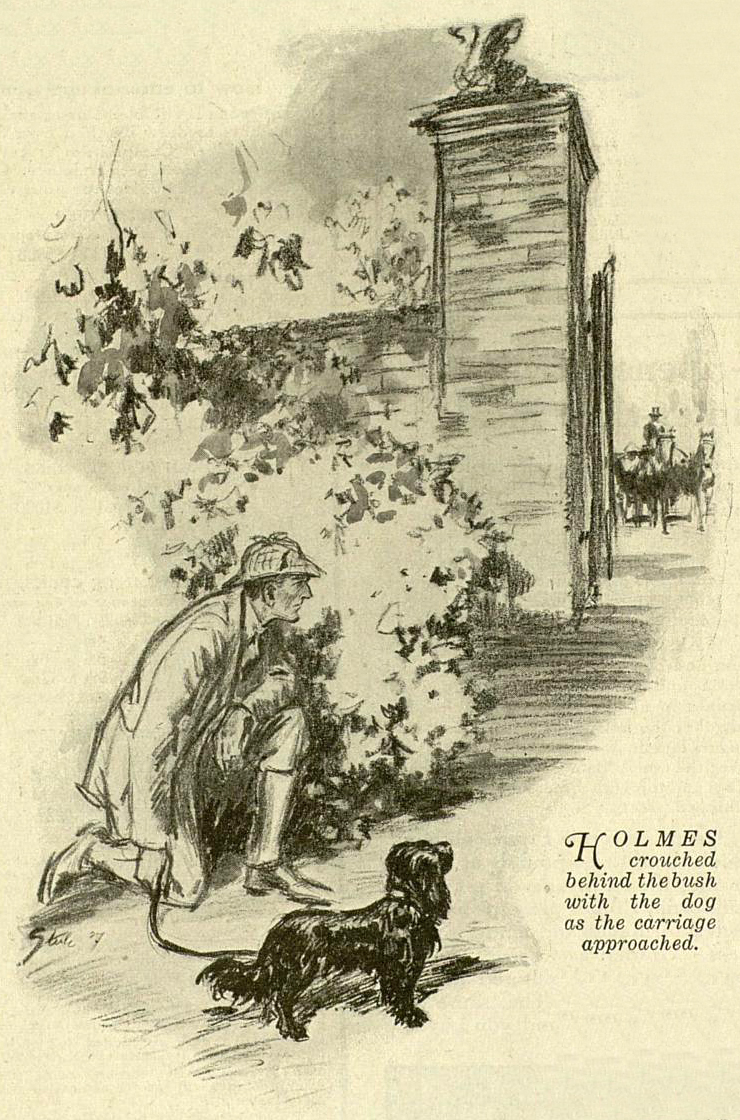
- 1927 illustration by Frederic Dorr Steele

Text available at Wikisource
- Country: United Kingdom
- Language: English
- Genre: Mystery

Publication
- Publication date: March 1927

Chronology
- Series: The Case-Book of Sherlock Holmes
The Veiled Lodger	—

"The Adventure of Shoscombe Old Place" is the last of the 56 Sherlock Holmes short stories by Arthur Conan Doyle. The story is part of the short story collection The Case-Book of Sherlock Holmes. It was first published in the US in Liberty in March 1927. It was published in the UK in The Strand Magazine in April 1927. The original title "The Adventure of the Black Spaniel" was changed before publication.

== Plot ==
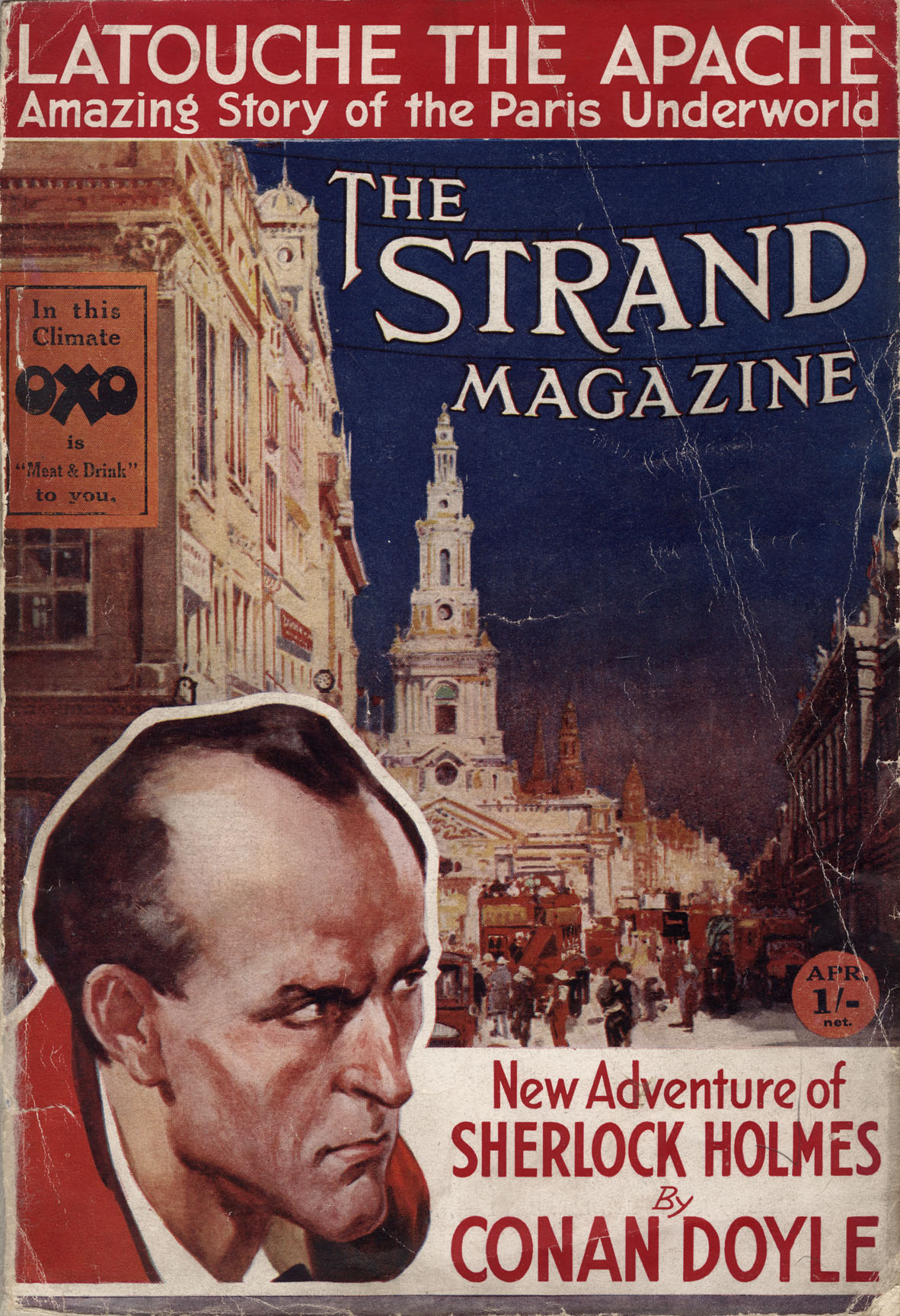
Cover of The Strand Magazine featuring the publication of the last Sherlock Holmes story written by Arthur Conan Doyle: "The Adventure of Shoscombe Old Place".

Head trainer John Mason from Shoscombe Old Place, a racing stable in Berkshire, comes to Sherlock Holmes about his master, Sir Robert Norberton, Baronet. Mason thinks he has gone mad. Sir Robert's sister, Lady Beatrice Falder, owns Shoscombe, but it will revert to her late husband's brother when she dies. The stable has a horse, Shoscombe Prince, who Sir Robert hopes will win the Derby. He would be out of debt if that actually happened.

Mason is not quite sure what he wants Holmes to investigate, but a number of odd changes have happened at the stable:

- Why has Lady Beatrice suddenly forgone her usual habit of stopping to greet her favourite horse? Why does she just ride on by in her carriage?
- Why has Sir Robert become so wild-eyed lately?
- Why has he given his sister's dog away to a neighbourhood innkeeper?
- Why does he go to the old crypt at night, and who is that man whom he meets there?
- Why have burnt human bones been found in the furnace at Shoscombe?

Holmes decides to investigate on the spot. He and Dr. Watson go to Berkshire posing as anglers and learn some interesting things. The keeper of the inn where they are staying is the one who now has Lady Beatrice's dog, and it is quite an expensive breed, one that an innkeeper ordinarily could never afford.

With the innkeeper's permission, Holmes takes the dog for a walk, and goes to Shoscombe, where he releases it as Lady Beatrice's carriage comes out of the gate. The dog dashes forward enthusiastically at first, but then flees in terror. Then, even though a maid and Lady Beatrice are supposedly the only two people in the carriage, it is a male voice that yells "Drive on!"

Then there is the crypt. John Mason observes that a heap of bones there earlier is now gone. Holmes finds a coffin with a fresh, swathed body in it. Just then, Sir Robert arrives, catching Holmes and Watson in the act. After Holmes makes it plain that he has deduced most of the odd goings-on, Sir Robert invites him and Watson back to the house and explains everything.

About a week earlier, Lady Beatrice died of dropsy, and Sir Robert felt compelled to keep the fact secret so that the creditors would not swoop down on Shoscombe before he had a chance to win the Derby and pay off all his debts. Sir Robert and the maid's husband transported his deceased sister to the crypt and hid the body in the coffin, but also found that they had to dispose of the coffin's original body—in the furnace. The maid's husband also dressed up in Lady Beatrice's clothes and took her place in the carriage each day. The dog knew what had happened and might have given the game away if its barking protests had aroused suspicion, which is why Sir Robert had given away the dog to the innkeeper.

Holmes refers the matter to the police, but the story ends happily. Shoscombe Prince wins the Derby, Sir Robert escapes any major judicial penalty for what he did to his sister's body, and he pays off all his debts with a great deal left over.

== Publication history ==
"The Adventure of Shoscombe Old Place" was published in the US in Liberty in March 1927, and in the UK in The Strand Magazine in April 1927. The story was published with seven illustrations by Frederic Dorr Steele in Liberty, and with five illustrations by Frank Wiles in the Strand. It was included in the short story collection The Case-Book of Sherlock Holmes, which was published in the UK and the US in June 1927.

== Adaptations ==
=== Radio and audio dramas ===
The story was dramatised by Edith Meiser in 1931 as part of the American radio series The Adventures of Sherlock Holmes. It aired on 30 March 1931 with Richard Gordon as Sherlock Holmes and Leigh Lovell as Dr. Watson.

Other dramatisations of the story, also adapted by Meiser, aired on the American radio series The New Adventures of Sherlock Holmes on 9 March 1941 (with Basil Rathbone as Holmes and Nigel Bruce as Watson) and 15 February 1948 (with John Stanley as Holmes and Alfred Shirley as Watson).

A radio adaptation of the story aired in 1959 on the BBC Light Programme, as part of the 1952–1969 radio series starring Carleton Hobbs as Sherlock Holmes and Norman Shelley as Dr. Watson. It was adapted by Michael Hardwick, and featured Frederick Treves as John Mason and Ronald Baddiley as Josiah Barnes.

An audio drama based on the story was released on one side of a 1971 LP record in a series of recordings starring Robert Hardy as Holmes and Nigel Stock as Watson. It was dramatised and produced by Michael Hardwick (who adapted the 1959 BBC radio version of the same story) and Mollie Hardwick.

"Shoscombe Old Place" was dramatised for BBC Radio 4 in 1994 by Michael Bakewell as part of the 1989–1998 radio series starring Clive Merrison as Holmes and Michael Williams as Watson. It featured Nicholas Le Prevost as John Mason, Donald Pickering as Sir Robert, and Desmond Llewelyn as Palfreyman.

In 2006, the story was adapted for radio by M. J. Elliott as an episode of The Classic Adventures of Sherlock Holmes, a series on the American radio show Imagination Theatre, with John Patrick Lowrie as Holmes and Lawrence Albert as Watson.

In 2024, the podcast Sherlock & Co. adapted the story in a three-episode adventure called "Shoscombe Old Place", starring Harry Attwell as Holmes and Paul Waggott as Watson.

=== Television ===
The story was adapted for the 1968 BBC series with Peter Cushing. The episode is now lost.

The story was also dramatised in 1991 in Granada TV's Sherlock Holmes, starring Jeremy Brett. Jude Law, who later played Dr. Watson in the 2009 film Sherlock Holmes, plays Joe Barnes, the young man who impersonates Lady Beatrice.
