= The Adventure of the Veiled Lodger =

Short story by Arthur Conan Doyle

- Short story by Arthur Conan Doyle
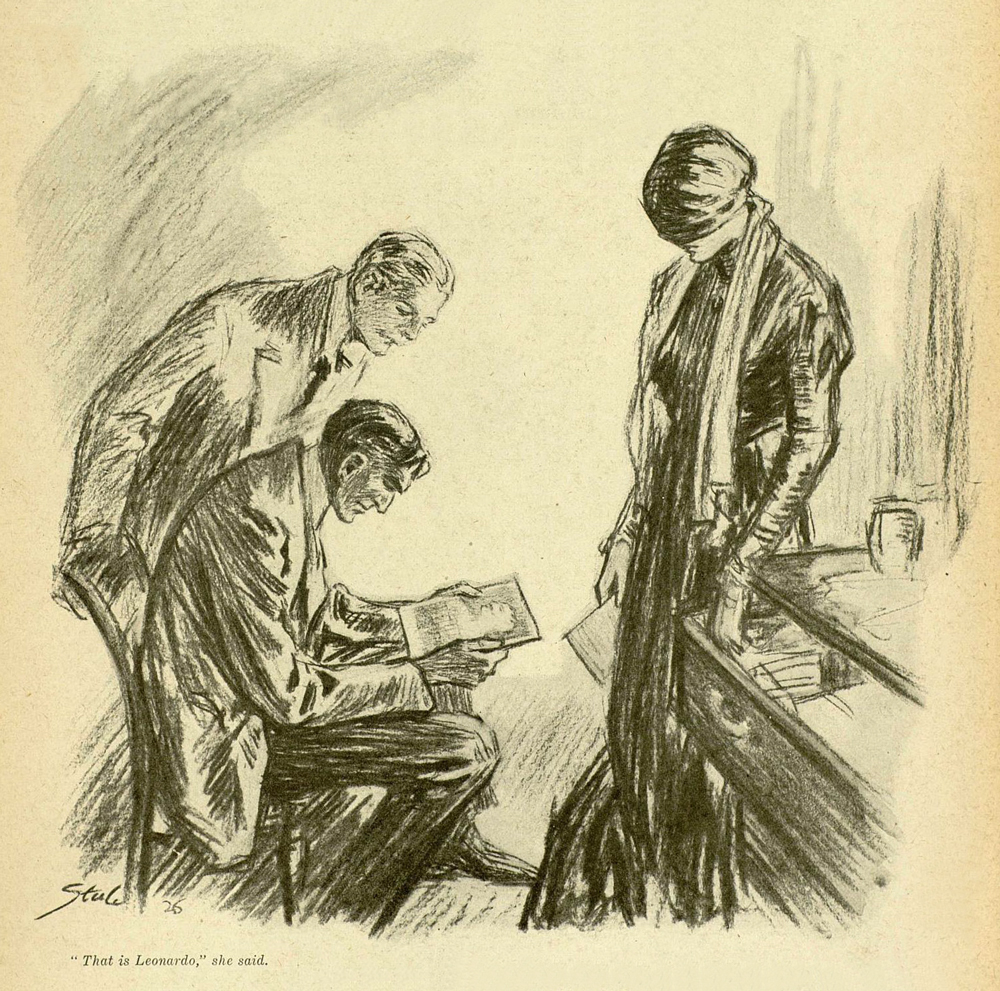
- 1927 illustration by Frederic Dorr Steele

Text available at Wikisource

Publication
- Publication date: 1927

Chronology
- Series: The Case-Book of Sherlock Holmes
The Retired Colourman	Shoscombe Old Place

"The Adventure of the Veiled Lodger" (1927), one of the 56 Sherlock Holmes short stories written by British author Sir Arthur Conan Doyle, is one of 12 stories in the cycle collected as The Case-Book of Sherlock Holmes.

== Plot ==
Holmes is visited by Mrs Merrilow, a landlady from South Brixton who has an unusual lodger who never shows her face. She saw it once accidentally and it was hideously mutilated. This woman, formerly very quiet, has recently taken to cursing in the night, shouting "Murder, murder!" and "You cruel beast! You monster!" Also, her health has taken a turn for the worse, and she is wasting away. Mrs Merrilow has brought this case to Holmes's attention as her tenant, Mrs Ronder, will not involve the clergy or the police in something that she would like to say. She has told her landlady to mention Abbas Parva, knowing that Holmes would understand the reference.

Indeed, he does. It was a most tragic case in which a circus lion somehow got loose and savaged two people, one of whom was killed, and the other badly disfigured. The latter is apparently this lodger – the former was her husband. Holmes could make little of the case at the time, but perhaps if someone had actually hired him, the outcome would have been different. As it was, the inquest ruled that Mr Ronder was the victim of death by misadventure. Still, even the local police were a bit disturbed at the time by some seeming inconsistencies in the accounts. For example, the lion was part of an act which Mr and Mrs Ronder performed right in its cage, and they were the ones who fed it. Why had it suddenly turned on its feeders? Why had it not tried to escape? Who was this man whom several people heard screaming when supposedly Mr Ronder had already been killed?

Upon arriving at Brixton, Holmes and Watson are shown into Mrs Ronder's room, which she seldom leaves. She is wearing her veil. Her purpose, it seems, is to make a clean breast of the matter before she dies. She tells Holmes and Watson that Mr Ronder was a terrible husband, cruel and violent in the extreme, even to the circus animals, but he didn't care, even though he wound up in the dock for it several times. He was very rich and the fines meant nothing.

The circus strongman, Leonardo, was Mrs Ronder's lover. He was always very supportive and encouraging to her, who, in turn, felt that Leonardo was the only man her husband feared. Eventually, Mrs Ronder and Leonardo realized that Mr Ronder was not fit to live, and formed a plan to kill him. As part of the plan, Leonardo made a club with five nails in it, which could deliver wounds that might be mistaken for those of a lion's paw. Then, one night at Abbas Parva, a small village in Berkshire where the circus was camped for the night, Mrs Ronder and Leonardo carried out their plan. When Mrs Ronder and her husband went to the lion's cage to feed it, Leonardo crept up behind them and smashed Mr Ronder's head with the club, and Mrs Ronder released the lion to make it appear that it had broken free and done the deed. But the lion, having been driven into a feeding frenzy by the scent of Mr Ronder's blood, turned and pounced on Mrs Ronder instead, badly chewing her face up in the process. At the sight of this, Leonardo started screaming and ran to get help from the other circus members. He could have saved his lover himself by using the club on the lion, but he was too cowardly.

Mrs Ronder could not bring herself to implicate Leonardo in her husband's murder at the inquest, and is only now telling Holmes and Watson this story because she believes that she will soon die. She never saw or heard of Leonardo again, and later learned that he had drowned. Ever since the night of the incident, she has lived alone and veiled. Holmes can only offer advice in this situation; realizing that Mrs Ronder is contemplating suicide, he reminds her that her life is worth something as an example of patient suffering in an impatient world. She responds to this by lifting her veil, and the sight is ghastly.

Nevertheless, Holmes receives a bottle of prussic acid from Mrs Ronder a day after. She was going to use it to kill herself, but upon considering what Holmes told her, she apparently thought better of it.

== Publication history ==
"The Adventure of the Veiled Lodger" was first published in the US in Liberty in January 1927, and was first published in the UK in The Strand Magazine in February 1927. The story was published with four illustrations by Frederic Dorr Steele in Liberty, and with three illustrations by Frank Wiles in the Strand. It was included in the short story collection The Case-Book of Sherlock Holmes, which was published in the UK and the US in June 1927.

== Adaptations ==
=== Radio and audio dramas ===
In 1932, the story was adapted by Edith Meiser as part of the American radio series The Adventures of Sherlock Holmes. It aired on 26 May 1932, with Richard Gordon as Sherlock Holmes and Leigh Lovell as Dr. Watson. Another dramatisation of the story adapted by Meiser aired on the same series on 31 March 1935 (with Louis Hector as Holmes and Lovell as Watson).

Meiser also adapted the story as episodes of the American radio series The New Adventures of Sherlock Holmes that aired on 15 February 1942 (with Basil Rathbone as Holmes and Nigel Bruce as Watson) and 20 June 1948 (with John Stanley as Holmes and Alfred Shirley as Watson).

"The Veiled Lodger" was dramatised for BBC Radio 4 in 1994 by Roger Danes as part of the 1989–1998 radio series starring Clive Merrison as Holmes and Michael Williams as Watson. It featured Harriet Walter as Eugenia Ronder and Douglas Henshall as Leonardo.

In 2006, the story was adapted for radio as an episode of The Classic Adventures of Sherlock Holmes, a series on the American radio show Imagination Theatre, with John Patrick Lowrie as Holmes and Lawrence Albert as Watson.

In 2025, the podcast Sherlock & Co. adapted the story in a two-episode adventure called "The Veiled Lodger", starring Harry Attwell as Sherlock Holmes, Paul Waggott as Dr. John Watson and Marta da Silva as Mariana "Mrs. Hudson" Ametxazurra.

=== Television ===
The 1993 episode "The Eligible Bachelor" of the Grenada Television Sherlock Holmes series with Jeremy Brett as Holmes integrates the narrative device, borrowed from this story, of Holmes being contacted by a veiled woman mauled by a leopard, but changes the names, characters, and situation to make it a sub-element of a main plot based on "The Adventure of the Noble Bachelor".
