= The Adventure of the Creeping Man =

1923 Sherlock Holmes story

- Short story by Arthur Conan Doyle
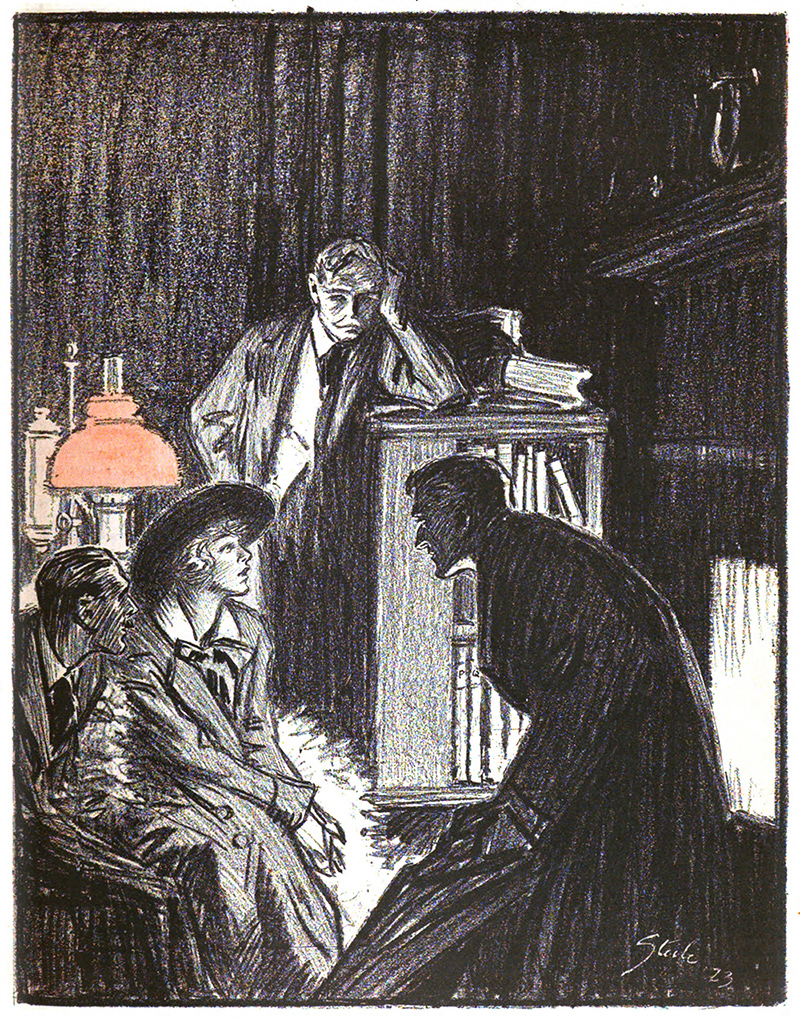
- 1923 illustration by Frederic Dorr Steele in Hearst's International.

Publication
- Publication date: March 1923

Chronology
- Series: The Case-Book of Sherlock Holmes
The Problem of Thor Bridge	The Sussex Vampire

"The Adventure of the Creeping Man" (1923) is one of 12 Sherlock Holmes short stories by Arthur Conan Doyle collected in The Case-Book of Sherlock Holmes (1927). The story was first published in The Strand Magazine in the United Kingdom and Hearst's International in the United States in March 1923. Watson states at the beginning of the story that this case was among the last that Holmes investigated before retiring to Sussex in 1903.

== Plot ==
A man named Trevor Bennett, the personal secretary of Professor Presbury, comes to Holmes with a most unusual problem. He is engaged to the professor's daughter, Edith, and the Professor is himself engaged to a young lady, Alice Morphy, although he himself is already 61 years of age. Their impending marriage has caused no scandal, but the trouble seems to have begun at about the time of the engagement. First, the professor suddenly left home for a fortnight without telling anyone of his destination, with the family later learning that he had been to Prague. Upon returning, Presbury unprecedentedly forbade Bennett from opening certain stamped letters. The professor had also brought a carved wooden box from Prague, and became very angry with Bennett for touching it.

The whole household also observes severe changes in the man's personality: he has become furtive and sly, with changes in his moods and habits, some of which are quite bizarre, though not impeding his functions. Bennett notes particularly strange incidents: one, in which he saw the professor crawling along the hall on his hands and feet and his master swore him off; and another, witnessed by Edith Presbury, who saw her father at two o'clock in the morning at her bedroom window on the second floor.

Further, the professor's usually faithful Irish Wolfhound has started attacking him (Holmes notes this happens at 9 day intervals), and has to be chained up outside.

Holmes and Watson go to the university city of Camford to see the professor. They pretend that they have an appointment, but the professor sees through the ruse and becomes furiously angry at the intrusion. Bennett dissuades the professor from violence. Holmes and Watson leave with Holmes confiding to Watson that the visit has taught him that the professor's mind is clear and functional despite recent behaviour. Bennett tells Holmes that he has found the address of the mysterious letters. The addressee is a man named Dorak, a Central European name, fitting with the professor's secret journey to Prague. Holmes later finds out from Mercer, his "general utility man", that Dorak is indeed an elderly Bohemian who keeps a large general store. Holmes examines Edith's bedroom window, finding that the only way to climb up to it is using the creeper, unusual for a 61-year-old man.

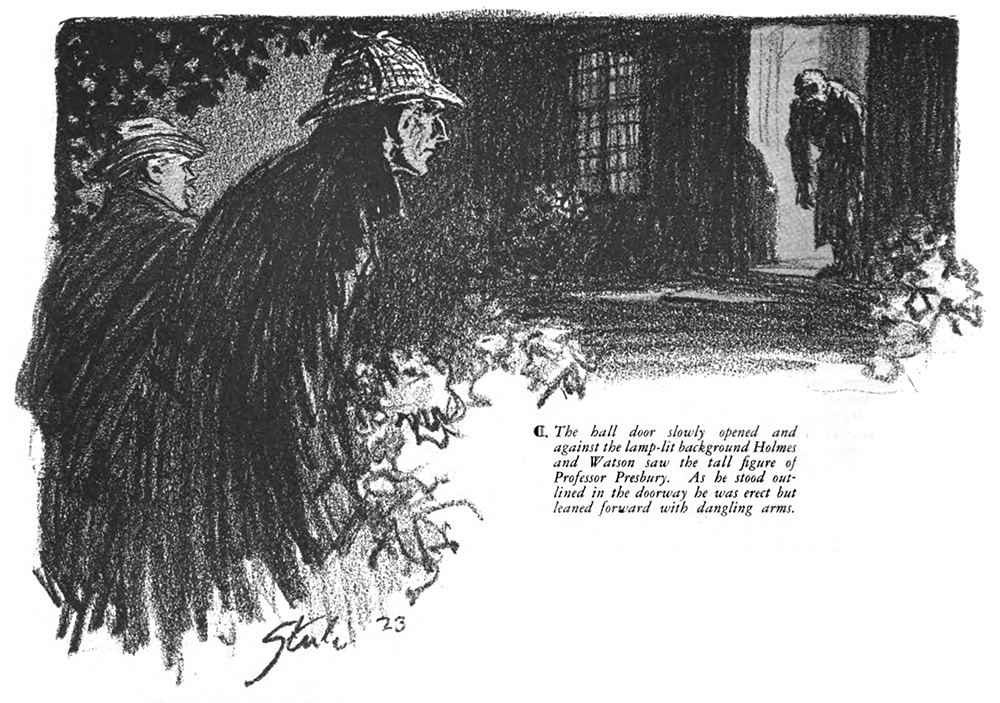
1923 illustration by Frederic Dorr Steele.

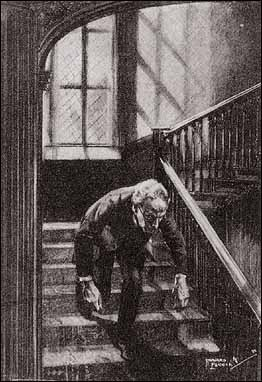
1923 illustration in Strand Magazine by Howard Elcock.

Holmes forms a theory that every 9 days Professor Presbury takes some drug which causes the odd behaviour, having become addicted in Prague, and is supplied by Dorak in London. Holmes also comes to realise, by connecting the professor's thick and horny knuckles, his odd behaviour, the dog's attacks, and the use of the creeper, that the professor is behaving like a monkey.

Shortly after the realisation, Holmes and Watson are treated to a firsthand display of Professor Presbury's odd behaviour. He comes out of the house, scampers about on all fours, climbs on the creeper, and torments the tied-up dog. Unfortunately, the wolfhound gets loose and attacks the professor. The two of them, with Mr. Bennett's help, get the dog off the professor who is wounded badly. Watson and Bennett, also a medical man, tend to the professor's injuries.

Holmes then examines the professor's little wooden box after having obtained the key from the unconscious owner. It contained a drug, as Holmes expected, but also a letter from a man named Lowenstein, whom Watson reveals to be a notorious quack. The professor had sought out Lowenstein's rejuvenation treatments due to his upcoming marriage to a younger woman. The drug's effects are explained as a consequence of being obtained from langurs. Promising to hold Lowenstein responsible, Holmes muses on the consequences of such drugs and departs with Watson.

== Commentaries ==
David Stuart Davies, who has written an afterword for the Case-Book, comments that this story "veers towards risible science fiction". This is one of four stories said to be forged "drivel" in Nicholas Meyer's 1974 novel The Seven-Per-Cent Solution. (The other three are also from The Case-Book of Sherlock Holmes.)

Ancient philosophy scholar Jonathan Barnes writes of encountering the story as a child and finding it "one of the richest and most singular investigations of Holmes's long career – an opinion which I have had no reason to change ... Revisited in adulthood, the story reveals itself as a sour parable about the endurance of lust, a lurid treatment of the question that is put to Falstaff as Doll Tearsheet fidgets on his knee: 'Is it not strange that desire should so many years outlive performance?'. Yet, curiously, the feeling persists that there is something in the narrative – hidden, submerged – which the reader is not permitted to comprehend but which forms the source of its power."

== Publication history ==
"The Adventure of the Creeping Man" was published in the UK in The Strand Magazine in March 1923, and in the US in Hearst's International in the same month. The story was published with five illustrations by Howard K. Elcock in the Strand, and with seven illustrations by Frederic Dorr Steele in Hearst's International. It was included in the short story collection The Case-Book of Sherlock Holmes, which was published in the UK and the US in June 1927.

== Adaptations ==
=== Radio and audio dramas ===
The story was adapted by Edith Meiser as an episode of the American radio series The Adventures of Sherlock Holmes. The episode aired on 2 February 1931, with Richard Gordon as Sherlock Holmes and Leigh Lovell as Dr. Watson.

Meiser also adapted the story for the American radio series The New Adventures of Sherlock Holmes as an episode which aired on 27 November 1939 (as "The Mystery of the Creeping Man"). Another dramatisation of the story aired on 9 July 1943. Both episodes featured Basil Rathbone as Holmes and Nigel Bruce as Watson. An adaptation of the story aired on 10 March 1947 with Tom Conway as Holmes and Bruce as Watson.

"The Creeping Man" was also dramatised for BBC Radio 4 in 1994 by Robert Forrest as part of the 1989–1998 radio series starring Clive Merrison as Holmes and Michael Williams as Watson. It featured Robin Ellis as Professor Presbury and Annabel Mullion as Alice Murphy.

In 2010, the story was adapted for radio as an episode of The Classic Adventures of Sherlock Holmes, a series on the American radio show Imagination Theatre, with John Patrick Lowrie as Holmes and Lawrence Albert as Watson.

In 2024, the podcast Sherlock & Co adapted the story in a three-episode adventure called "The Creeping Man", starring Harry Attwell as Holmes and Paul Waggott as Watson.

=== Television ===
The story was dramatised in 1991 in Granada TV's Sherlock Holmes, starring Jeremy Brett as Holmes and Edward Hardwicke as Watson. The adaptation is relatively faithful to the plot, but includes a subplot involving Inspector Lestrade investigating the thefts of various primates from London's zoos: these are later revealed by Holmes to be the sources from which the serum is obtained.

A 2001 episode of the animated television series Sherlock Holmes in the 22nd Century was adapted from the story. In this story, Professor Presbury was going to be wed to Inspector Lestrade's old friend Alice. Having also been in love with Alice, Presbury's lab assistant Trevor Bennett has him transformed into a primate-like creature. After Presbury is returned to normal, Bennett is arrested by Lestrade.

== Sources ==
Lowenstein's development of a "rejuvenation serum" derived from monkeys parallels actual treatments popularised in the early twentieth century, notably those of the Russian-born surgeon Serge Voronoff, who had experimented with injections of extracts from animal glands; in the 1920s, he popularised the transplantation into humans of tissue from monkey testicles.
