= The Case-Book of Sherlock Holmes =

1927 collection of short stories by Arthur Conan Doyle

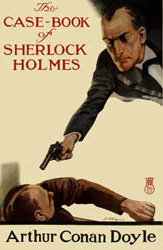
- Dust-jacket illustration of the first edition of The Case-Book of Sherlock Holmes
- Author: Arthur Conan Doyle
- Language: English
- Series: Sherlock Holmes
- Genre: Detective fiction
- Publisher: John Murray
- Publication date: 1927
- Publication place: United Kingdom
- Media type: Print (hardback)
- Pages: 320
- Preceded by: His Last Bow
- Text: The Case-Book of Sherlock Holmes at Wikisource

The Case-Book of Sherlock Holmes is the final set of twelve (out of a total of fifty-six) Sherlock Holmes short stories by British writer Arthur Conan Doyle first published in the Strand Magazine between October 1921 and April 1927.

== Title of collection ==
The first British edition of the collection, published by John Murray, and the first American edition, published by George H. Doran Co., were both published in June 1927. However, in the title of the British collection "Case-Book " was hyphenated. In the American edition it appeared as "Case Book" (two words). Some later publishers released the collection under the title The Casebook of Sherlock Holmes ("Casebook" as a single word).

== Contents ==
The first edition of The Case-Book, published by John Murray in 1927, does not present the stories in the order in which they were published:

First edition (John Murray, 1927)
Chapter	Story	First publication		Refs
Chapter	Story	Date	Magazine(s)	Refs
1	"The Adventure of the Illustrious Client"	8 November 1924	Collier's	
2	"The Adventure of the Blanched Soldier"	16 October 1926	Liberty	
3	"The Adventure of the Mazarin Stone"	October 1921	The Strand Magazine	
4	"The Adventure of the Three Gables"	18 September 1926	Liberty	
5	"The Adventure of the Sussex Vampire"	January 1924	The Strand Magazine; Hearst's International	
6	"The Adventure of the Three Garridebs"	25 October 1924	Collier's	
7	"The Problem of Thor Bridge"	February–March 1922	The Strand Magazine; Hearst's International	
8	"The Adventure of the Creeping Man"	March 1923	The Strand Magazine; Hearst's International	
9	"The Adventure of the Lion's Mane"	27 November 1926	Liberty	
10	"The Adventure of the Veiled Lodger"	22 January 1927	Liberty	
11	"The Adventure of Shoscombe Old Place"	5 March 1927	Liberty	
12	"The Adventure of the Retired Colourman"	18 December 1926	Liberty	

== Copyright history and challenges ==
In the United States, two of the short stories from The Case-Book, "The Adventure of the Veiled Lodger" and "The Adventure of Shoscombe Old Place", were the last two Sherlock Holmes works by Doyle still protected by copyright. They entered the public domain on 1 January 2023, the year after the 95th anniversary of the stories' publication. The copyrights expired on 1 January 1981 in the United Kingdom, Canada and Australia. In the United Kingdom, its copyright was later revived in 1995, expiring again on 1 January 2001.

The Conan Doyle Estate Ltd. claimed they held the American copyrights. The company had a web page setting out its views about other claimants to those rights.

In 2013, the United States District Court for the Northern District of Illinois handed down a ruling about copyright protection, not for the stories themselves, but for the characters of Holmes and Watson. The defendant in the case was Conan Doyle Estate Ltd. The plaintiff was well-known Sherlockian editor, and Los Angeles entertainment lawyer, Leslie S. Klinger. In the case of Klinger v. Conan Doyle Estate, Ltd., the court ruled that the Holmes and Watson characters as described in the "story elements" that stem from most of the stories—those published before 1924—are in the public domain.

== Literary significance and reception ==
Although some of the stories are comparable with Doyle's earlier work, this collection is often considered a lesser entry in the Sherlock Holmes canon. Kyle Freeman, author of the introduction to The Complete Sherlock Holmes, is particularly critical of "The Mazarin Stone" and "The Three Gables", stating that "[a]lmost nothing about either of 'The Mazarin Stone' or 'The Three Gables' has the true ring of Conan Doyle's style about them."

Two authors who have written novels using Sherlock Holmes as a character, British writer David Stuart Davies and American author and director Nicholas Meyer have criticised stories from this collection. Davies has commented that "The Creeping Man" "veers towards risible science fiction". In his 1974 novel The Seven-Per-Cent Solution, Meyer's Watson claims that this entry, as well as three others from the Case-Book ("The Mazarin Stone", "The Three Gables" and "The Lion's Mane"), are forged "drivel".

David Timson noted the new era of the 1920s in an introduction to The Case-Book of Sherlock Holmes: "It seems amazing therefore that a new series of Sherlock Holmes stories should have appeared as late as the 1920s. But despite the 1920s being the age of jazz and the flapper, where such items as telephones, electric light, electric bells, motor cars, and gramophones were becoming commonplace, the Holmes phenomenon showed no signs of diminishing. The stories, despite being set for the most part in the early 1900s, were still as eagerly read as ever. Indeed, modern technology was encouraging Holmes's popularity. By 1921 the developing silent film industry already had 15 Sherlock Holmes adaptations on its shelves, including a full-length Hound of the Baskervilles. Between 1921 and 1927 Conan Doyle once again returned to his great creation for 12 more stories which were first published in The Strand, and then published collectively as The Case-Book of Sherlock Holmes in 1927."

Recognizing that some reviewers have found the short stories in this collection as not like Conan Doyle's style, Timson suggests that "In these stories, Conan Doyle seems to be struggling to find a new narrative style. Nine are related by Watson as the reader would expect, but one is narrated in the third person, and two by Holmes himself. Watson is at pains in the opening narrative to "Thor Bridge" to explain the change: 'In some [cases] I was myself concerned and can speak as an eye-witness, while in others I was either not present or played so small a part that they could only be told as by a third person.' ... Conan Doyle's struggle to ring the changes on what had become for him a tired formula reflected his personal literary journey: he was reluctant to write fiction at all by the 1920s in view of his commitment to spiritualism."

Three stories of the collection are not narrated by Dr Watson, unlike most Sherlock Holmes stories. "The Mazarin Stone" is narrated in the third person, since it was adapted from a stage play in which Watson hardly appeared. "The Blanched Soldier" and "The Lion's Mane" are both narrated by Holmes himself, the latter being set after his retirement.

== Adaptations ==
Some series have featured adaptations of all the stories in The Case-Book of Sherlock Holmes, including the radio series The Adventures of Sherlock Holmes (1930–1936) and the later radio series The New Adventures of Sherlock Holmes (1939–1950). All but two of the stories in the collection were dramatised for radio as part of the BBC Sherlock Holmes 1952–1969 radio series.

The stories in the collection, except "The Blanched Soldier", "The Lion's Mane", and "The Retired Colourman", were adapted into episodes of the Granada television series (1984–1994). "The Mazarin Stone" and "The Three Garridebs" were combined for one episode, and elements of "The Veiled Lodger" were incorporated into the Granada adaptation of "The Noble Bachelor". The Case-Book of Sherlock Holmes was adapted for BBC Radio 4 in 1994–1995 as part of the Sherlock Holmes 1989–1998 radio series. All the stories in the collection were adapted as episodes of the radio series The Classic Adventures of Sherlock Holmes (2005–2016). Other adaptations of stories within the collection have also been produced.

== Sources ==
- Redmond, Christopher (2009). "The Case-Book of Sherlock Holmes". Sherlock Holmes Handbook (Second ed.). Dundurn. pp. 34–36. ISBN 978-1-77070-592-0 – via Google Books.
- Pugh, Brian W (2011). A Chronology of the Life of Arthur Conan Doyle. Andrews UK. ISBN 978-1-78092-199-0 – via Google Books.
