= Sherlock & Co. =

British podcast

- Cover art
- Genre: Mystery; Dramedy
- Language: English

Creative team
- Created by: Joel Emery
- Directed by: Adam Jarrell

Cast and voices
- Starring: Paul Waggott; Harry Attwell; Marta da Silva

Production
- Production: Goalhanger Podcasts

Publication
- No. of episodes: 155
- Original release: 10 October 2023

Related
- Website: sherlockandco.co.uk

Sherlock & Co. is a British audio drama podcast that reimagines Sir Arthur Conan Doyle’s Sherlock Holmes stories in a modern setting, presented through the perspective of Dr. John Watson. The podcast follows Watson, portrayed as a true crime podcaster and former British Army doctor, as he recounts his adventures with the brilliant detective Sherlock Holmes. Sherlock & Co. was created by Joel Emery, directed by Adam Jarrell, and features Paul Waggott as Dr. John Watson, Harry Attwell as Sherlock Holmes, and Marta da Silva as Mariana "Mrs. Hudson" Ametxazurra.

The series was created by Holy Smokes Audio in partnership with Goalhanger Podcasts—who originally commissioned the show—and launched in October 2023, with episodes released weekly. It is the first fictional Goalhanger Podcast.

== Format ==
Each episode is narrated by Dr. John Watson, who edits and narrates the true-crime podcast, echoing his role in the original stories as the chronicler of Holmes’ cases. Watson talks directly to the "listeners", as he takes his audio recorder on missions. The format provides a firsthand account of the mysteries, presenting the stories as lived through experiences, including references to modern politics and events.

Each episode is an adaptation of Doyle's novels and short stories, using the original titles, reimagined to fit a contemporary context and expanded to explore the personal lives of Holmes and his friends. However, the adventures do not occur in the same order as the original canon, with many previously disconnected stories being tied together to form new overarching narratives.

== Cast ==
=== Main ===
- Paul Waggott – John Watson
- Harry Attwell – Sherlock Holmes
- Marta da Silva – Mariana "Mrs. Hudson" Ametxazurra

=== Recurring ===
- Dexter (Adam’s Dog) – Archie
- Leigh McDonald – Carol Watson
- John Brannoch – Wiggins
- Adam Jarrell – Mike "Stammo" Stamford
- Sharon D. Clarke – Dame Gwendolyn "Gwen" Lestrade
- Ant McGinley – Detective Inspector Tom Gregson
- Jasmine Kerr – Lily Lestrade
- Thomas Mitchells – Mycroft Holmes

== Episodes ==
=== Episode list ===
Story #	Episode #	Story Title	Story Length	Episode Title	Release Date¹	Ad-free length (minutes)
1	1	Mr. Sherlock Holmes	1 episode	Mr. Sherlock Holmes²	10 Oct 2023	32m
2	2	The Illustrious Client	3 episodes	The Edelweiss Murder	10 Oct 2023	26m
2	3	The Illustrious Client	3 episodes	The Woman Collector	17 Oct 2023	24m
2	4	The Illustrious Client	3 episodes	Janet Jackson and the Ming Dynasty	24 Oct 2023	44m
3	5	The Noble Bachelor	2 episodes	The Disappearance of Harriet Doran	31 Oct 2023	32m
3	6	The Noble Bachelor	2 episodes	Bloody Mary	7 Nov 2023	23m
4	7	The Problem of Thor Bridge	2 episodes	The Killing of Matheus Gibson	14 Nov 2023	33m
4	8	The Problem of Thor Bridge	2 episodes	Death Do Us Part	21 Nov 2023	29m
5	9	The Golden Pince-Nez	3 episodes	The Lamentable Death of Young Willoughby Smith	28 Nov 2023	26m
5	10	The Golden Pince-Nez	3 episodes	The Dying Preacher	5 Dec 2023	25m
5	11	The Golden Pince-Nez	3 episodes	The Killer is in the House	12 Dec 2023	32m
6	12	The Blue Carbuncle	2 episodes	A Wild Goose Chase	19 Dec 2023	31m
6	13	The Blue Carbuncle	2 episodes	Mad Tidings	26 Dec 2023	32m
7	14	The Cardboard Box	2 episodes	Happy New Ear(s)	2 Jan 2024	26m
7	15	The Cardboard Box	2 episodes	The Bloody Barge	9 Jan 2024	33m
8	16	The Red-Headed League	3 episodes	The Bad Actor and the Red Flags	16 Jan 2024	31m
8	17	The Red-Headed League	3 episodes	The Billionaires at the Opera	23 Jan 2024	27m
8	18	The Red-Headed League	3 episodes	A Gun, A Motorbike and Waterloo Bridge	30 Jan 2024	31m
9	19	The Gloria Scott	2 episodes	He Came From the Land Down Under	6 Feb 2024	34m
9	20	The Gloria Scott	2 episodes	Hunted to the Grave	13 Feb 2024	47m
10	21	The Solitary Cyclist	2 episodes	The Doxxing of Violet Carruthers	20 Feb 2024	38m
10	22	The Solitary Cyclist	2 episodes	The Shotgun Wedding	27 Feb 2024	38m
11	23	The Creeping Man	3 episodes	The White Rat Killer	5 Mar 2024	31m
11	24	The Creeping Man	3 episodes	Live at the Apollo	12 Mar 2024	32m
11	25	The Creeping Man	3 episodes	Me, Myself and AI	19 Mar 2024	23m
12	26	The Retired Colourman	2 episodes	Paint the Town Dead	26 Mar 2024	27m
12	27	The Retired Colourman	2 episodes	Hide and Reek	2 Apr 2024	27m
13	28	Silver Blaze	4 episodes	Missing Like a Racehorse	9 Apr 2024	28m
13	29	Silver Blaze	4 episodes	If the Shoe Fitz	16 Apr 2024	31m
13	30	Silver Blaze	4 episodes	The Curious Incident	23 Apr 2024	27m
13	31	Silver Blaze	4 episodes	Off to the Races	30 Apr 2024	28m
14	32	The Reigate Squire	2 episodes	The Dark Arts	7 May 2024	30m
14	33	The Reigate Squire	2 episodes	Fake It Until You Make It	14 May 2024	30m
15	34	A Case of Identity	2 episodes	Hate the Player, Not the Game	21 May 2024	29m
15	35	A Case of Identity	2 episodes	Fallen Angel	28 May 2024	36m
16	36	The Dancing Men	3 episodes	We’ll Meet Again	4 Jun 2024	34m
16	37	The Dancing Men	3 episodes	Stalk the Stalk	11 Jun 2024	29m
16	38	The Dancing Men	3 episodes	American Lonewolf in London	18 Jun 2024	29m
17	39	Shoscombe Old Place	3 episodes	Gone Girl	25 Jun 2024	31m
17	40	Shoscombe Old Place	3 episodes	You've Got a Fast Car	2 Jul 2024	29m
17	41	Shoscombe Old Place	3 episodes	A Bone to Pick	9 Jul 2024	37m
18	42	The Lion's Mane	3 episodes	The White Whale	16 Jul 2024	34m
18	43	The Lion's Mane	3 episodes	Demon of the Sea	23 Jul 2024	33m
18	44	The Lion's Mane	3 episodes	Death in the Soul	30 Jul 2024	33m
19	45	The Three Students	2 episodes	A University Challenge	6 Aug 2024	33m
19	46	The Three Students	2 episodes	A Culprit on Campus	13 Aug 2024	43m
20	47	The Red Circle	4 episodes	The Best Adventure Ever	20 Aug 2024	22m
20	48	The Red Circle	4 episodes	The Italian Job	27 Aug 2024	26m
20	49	The Red Circle	4 episodes	Manhunt	3 Sep 2024	28m
20	50	The Red Circle	4 episodes	Badfellas	10 Sep 2024	24m
21	51	The Resident Patient	3 episodes	Crisis at the Clinic	16 Sep 2024	34m
21	52	The Resident Patient	3 episodes	Night Terror	23 Sep 2024	21m
21	53	The Resident Patient	3 episodes	Ghosts of the Past	30 Sep 2024	27m
22	54	The Sign of Four	10 episodes	Surakula	7 Oct 2024	46m
22	55	The Sign of Four	10 episodes	There’s Something about Mary	14 Oct 2024	40m
22	56	The Sign of Four	10 episodes	Murder He Note	21 Oct 2024	30m
22	57	The Sign of Four	10 episodes	A Passage to India	29 Oct 2024	37m
22	58	The Sign of Four	10 episodes	Indiana Holmes and the Temple of Pondicherry	4 Nov 2024	43m
22	59	The Sign of Four	10 episodes	London Calling	11 Nov 2024	37m
22	60	The Sign of Four	10 episodes	Aurora	18 Nov 2024	29m
22	61	The Sign of Four	10 episodes	Not to be Sniffed at	25 Nov 2024	37m
22	62	The Sign of Four	10 episodes	All the Small Things	2 Dec 2024	39m
22	63	The Sign of Four	10 episodes	The Andalucia	9 Dec 2024	50m
23	64	The Three Gables	3 episodes	An Unwanted Guest	17 Dec 2024	38m
23	65	The Three Gables	3 episodes	The Gossipmonger and the Solicitor	24 Dec 2024	28m
23	66	The Three Gables	3 episodes	Ghost of Christmas Past	31 Dec 2024	34m
24	67	The Veiled Lodger	2 episodes	Snow Way Out	7 Jan 2025	31m
24	68	The Veiled Lodger	2 episodes	The Predator and its Prey	14 Jan 2025	35m
25	69	Black Peter	3 episodes	Cabin in the Woods	21 Jan 2025	26m
25	70	Black Peter	3 episodes	The Widow’s Tale	28 Jan 2025	29m
25	71	Black Peter	3 episodes	The Soul of the Mountain	4 Feb 2025	27m
26	72	Wisteria Lodge	3 episodes	The Vanishing Host	11 Feb 2025	38m
26	73	Wisteria Lodge	3 episodes	They Fell From the Sky	18 Feb 2025	30m
26	74	Wisteria Lodge	3 episodes	The Tiger of Damascus	25 Feb 2025	29m
27	75	The Norwood Builder	4 episodes	The Killer in the Kitchen	4 Mar 2025	31m
27	76	The Norwood Builder	4 episodes	Siege at the Museum	11 Mar 2025	27m
27	77	The Norwood Builder	4 episodes	Trial by Gunfire	18 Mar 2025	26m
27	78	The Norwood Builder	4 episodes	Mousetrap	25 Mar 2025	31m
28	79	The Disappearance of Lady Frances Carfax	3 episodes	The Lady Doth Vanish	1 Apr 2025	30m
28	80	The Disappearance of Lady Frances Carfax	3 episodes	Penny For Your Thoughts	8 Apr 2025	33m
28	81	The Disappearance of Lady Frances Carfax	3 episodes	Pirates of the Mediterranean	15 Apr 2025	34m
29	82	Charles Augustus Milverton	3 episodes	The Slithering Serpent	22 Apr 2025	36m
29	83	Charles Augustus Milverton	3 episodes	Thieves in the Night	29 Apr 2025	31m
29	84	Charles Augustus Milverton	3 episodes	The Woman	6 May 2025	28m
30	85	A Scandal in Bohemia	5 episodes	By Royal Appointment	13 May 2025	30m
30	86	A Scandal in Bohemia	5 episodes	The Blind Prince	20 May 2025	32m
30	87	A Scandal in Bohemia	5 episodes	Cut the Case	27 May 2025	27m
30	88	A Scandal in Bohemia	5 episodes	The Boy who Would be King	3 Jun 2025	26m
30	89	A Scandal in Bohemia	5 episodes	The Great Game	10 Jun 2025	24m
31	90	The Blanched Soldier	2 episodes	The Face at the Window	17 Jun 2025	31m
31	91	The Blanched Soldier	2 episodes	The Ghost in the Manor	24 Jun 2025	48m
32	92	The Priory School	3 episodes	Into the Darkness	1 Jul 2025	43m
32	93	The Priory School	3 episodes	Hunting the Child Catcher	8 Jul 2025	33m
32	94	The Priory School	3 episodes	What Lies Beneath	15 Jul 2025	35m
33	95	The Abbey Grange	3 episodes	Back to the Future	22 Jul 2025	27m
33	96	The Abbey Grange	3 episodes	Monster of Gravesend	29 Jul 2025	41m
33	97	The Abbey Grange	3 episodes	The Killer Inside	5 Aug 2025	31m
34	98	The Mazarin Stone	3 episodes	The Detective’s Doppelgänger	12 Aug 2025	26m
34	99	The Mazarin Stone	3 episodes	The Source of the Universe	19 Aug 2025	35m
34	100	The Mazarin Stone	3 episodes	Romancing the Stone	26 Aug 2025	39m
35	101	The Missing Three-Quarter	3 episodes	The Game is Afootball	2 Sep 2025	34m
35	102	The Missing Three-Quarter	3 episodes	Looking for Dracula	9 Sep 2025	29m
35	103	The Missing Three-Quarter	3 episodes	There Will be Blood	16 Sep 2025	34m
36	104	The Hound of the Baskervilles	10 episodes	The Curse	23 Sep 2025	43m
36	105	The Hound of the Baskervilles	10 episodes	The Missing Shoe	30 Sep 2025	32m
36	106	The Hound of the Baskervilles	10 episodes	Three Broken Threads	7 Oct 2025	39m
36	107	The Hound of the Baskervilles	10 episodes	Baskerville Hall	14 Oct 2025	34m
36	108	The Hound of the Baskervilles	10 episodes	The Stapletons of Merripit House	21 Oct 2025	36m
36	109	The Hound of the Baskervilles	10 episodes	The Light on the Tor	28 Oct 2025	40m
36	110	The Hound of the Baskervilles	10 episodes	Death on the Moor	4 Nov 2025	23m
36	111	The Hound of the Baskervilles	10 episodes	The Last of the Baskervilles	11 Nov 2025	47m
36	112	The Hound of the Baskervilles	10 episodes	Human Remains	18 Nov 2025	31m
36	113	The Hound of the Baskervilles	10 episodes	The Hound of the Baskervilles	25 Nov 2025	50m
37	114	The Second Stain	2 episodes	Yes Minister	2 Dec 2025	29m
37	115	The Second Stain	2 episodes	Spy Another Day	9 Dec 2025	46m
38	116	The Man with the Twisted Lip	3 episodes	I'll Be Home For Christmas	16 Dec 2025	33m
38	117	The Man with the Twisted Lip	3 episodes	The Most Wonderful Crime of the Year	23 Dec 2025	40m
38	118	The Man with the Twisted Lip	3 episodes	The Little Angelman	30 Dec 2025	35m
39	119	The Musgrave Ritual	4 episodes	Old School	6 Jan 2026	32m
39	120	The Musgrave Ritual	4 episodes	Frozen In Time	13 Jan 2026	39m
39	121	The Musgrave Ritual	4 episodes	Murder on Ice	20 Jan 2026	29m
39	122	The Musgrave Ritual	4 episodes	Kings of The Castle	27 Jan 2026	39m
40	123	The Beryl Coronet	2 episodes	Double Booked	3 Feb 2026	30m
40	124	The Beryl Coronet	2 episodes	Bad Books	10 Feb 2026	41m
41	125	The Stockbroker's Clerk	3 episodes	The Trojan Horse	17 Feb 2026	28m
41	126	The Stockbroker's Clerk	3 episodes	Attack Of The Clones	24 Feb 2026	40m
41	127	The Stockbroker's Clerk	3 episodes	A Pycroft By Any Other Name	3 Mar 2026	35m
42	128	The Six Napoleons	4 episodes	Cops and Robber	10 Mar 2026	28m
42	129	The Six Napoleons	4 episodes	Another One Bites The Bust	17 Mar 2026	29m
42	130	The Six Napoleons	4 episodes	The Storm After The Calm	24 Mar 2026	29m
42	131	The Six Napoleons	4 episodes	The Napoleon Of Crime	31 Mar 2026	33m
43	132	The Three Garridebs	3 episodes	Late Knight	7 Apr 2026	33m
43	133	The Three Garridebs	3 episodes	The Killian is in the House	14 Apr 2026	36m
43	134	The Three Garridebs	3 episodes	Our Friend	21 Apr 2026	36m
44	135	The Empty House	3 episodes	Hawks Come Home To Roost	28 Apr 2026	33m
44	136	The Empty House	3 episodes	The Man In The Mirror	5 May 2026	25m
44	137	The Empty House	3 episodes	To Kill A Goldfinch	12 May 2026	35m
45	138	The Greek Interpreter	5 episodes	Greece Is The Word	19 May 2026	24m
45	139	The Greek Interpreter	5 episodes	Brothers In Arms	26 May 2026	40m
45	140	The Greek Interpreter	5 episodes	What Happens In Mykonos Stays In Mykonos	2 Jun 2026	39m
45	141	The Greek Interpreter	5 episodes	It's All Greek To Me	9 Jun 2026	31m
45	142	The Greek Interpreter	5 episodes	Late To The Early Grave	16 Jun 2026	30m
46	143	The Engineer's Thumb	3 episodes	Nightmare On Baker Street³	23 Jun 2026	34m
46	144	The Engineer's Thumb	3 episodes	The Night That Never Was	30 Jun 2026	36m
46	145	The Engineer's Thumb	3 episodes	The Last Ride	7 Jul 2026	36m
47	146	The Boscombe Valley Mystery	3 episodes	The Killing Of The Immortal Man	14 Jul 2026	30m
47	147	The Boscombe Valley Mystery	3 episodes	The Rat Is Out The Bag	21 Jul 2026	33m
47	148	The Boscombe Valley Mystery	3 episodes	The Third Man	28 Jul 2026	31m
48	149	The Copper Beeches	3 episodes	Bad Hair Day	4 Aug 2026	31m
48	150	The Copper Beeches	3 episodes	Shadow In The Night	11 Aug 2026	32m
48	151	The Copper Beeches	3 episodes	Meeting Mr. Fowler	18 Aug 2026	29m
49	152	The Bruce-Partington Plans	4 episodes	Dead In His Tracks	25 Aug 2026	31m
49	153	The Bruce-Partington Plans	4 episodes	Our Secret Valentine	1 Sep 2026	39m
49	154	The Bruce-Partington Plans	4 episodes	The Spy Who Stole My Podcast	8 Sep 2026	31m
49	155	The Bruce-Partington Plans	4 episodes	Blood Brothers	15 Sep 2026	30m
50	156	The Crooked Man	2 episodes	It's A Kinda Magic	22 Sep 2026	24m
50	157	The Crooked Man	2 episodes	His Tragic Spell	29 Sep 2026	40m
51	158	A Study in Scarlet	10 episodes	Happy Anniversary	06 Oct 2026	35m
51	159	A Study in Scarlet	10 episodes	An American Murder	13 Oct 2026	30m
51	160	A Study in Scarlet	10 episodes	Beware Of The Children	20 Oct 2026	33m
51	161	A Study in Scarlet	10 episodes	Wall Of Silence	27 Oct 2026	34m
51	162	A Study in Scarlet	10 episodes	Detective vs Detective	03 Nov 2026	26m
51	163	A Study in Scarlet	10 episodes	Banished	10 Nov 2026	26m
51	164	A Study in Scarlet	10 episodes	Old School	17 Nov 2026	27m
51	165	A Study in Scarlet	10 episodes	The Fallout	24 Nov 2026	37m
51	166	A Study in Scarlet	10 episodes	Hope Against Hope	01 Dec 2026	34m
51	167	A Study in Scarlet	10 episodes	Our Day In Court	08 Dec 2026	48m
52					15 Dec 2026	

1. Release date on all platforms excluding Patreon, where stories are released in full, excluding the annual ten-episode stories which release in two sets of five.
2. Episode 1 is an adaptation of the first chapter from A Study in Scarlet as the pair's introduction, at the end of the episode Sherlock mentions the mystery is already solved. 3 Years later they would continue the adaptation, focusing on the second half of the original story.
3. Episode 143 is a adaptation of The Case of Colonel Warburton's Madness, an unpublished case mentioned in The Adventure of the Engineer's Thumb

==== Patreon Exclusive Episodes ====
===== Mailbag Episodes =====
Starting in January 2024, as of October 2026, 41 "Mailbag" episodes have been released. These feature the cast in character answering fan mail, and building general world-building.

===== Newsletters =====
Starting in February 2024, as of April 2026, 15 "Newsletters" have been posted. These are written by John Watson, giving updates on adventures, merch, the characters, and the podcast.

===== Casefile Episodes =====
Starting in October 2024, as of March 2026, 5 Casefile episodes have been released. These feature the cast in character assessing previous cases and sometimes have people from the case back on the podcast and get their thoughts and feelings and what's happened since.

Episodes revisited:

- The Illustrious Client (2 episodes)
- The Golden Pince-Nez (2 episodes)
- The Solitary Cyclist (1 episodes)

===== Behind The Fourth Wall =====
Starting in March 2025, as of April 2026, (Creator) Joel and (Director) Adam have discussed the making of 5 different stories.

1. Behind the Fourth Wall - The Making of Sherlock & Co. Episode 01: Mr Sherlock Holmes
2. Behind the Fourth Wall - The Making of Sherlock & Co. Episode 02: The Noble Bachelor
3. Behind the Fourth Wall - The Making of Sherlock & Co. Episode 03: The Red-Headed League (Part 1 of 2)
4. Behind the Fourth Wall - The Making of Sherlock & Co. Episode 04: The Red-Headed League (Part 2 of 2)
5. Behind the Fourth Wall - The Making of Sherlock & Co. Episode 05: Silver Blaze
6. Behind the Fourth Wall - The Making of Sherlock & Co. Episode 06: The Dancing Men

===== Audiobooks =====
Starting in August 2025 (to celebrate their 100th regular episode), as of July 2026, 6 stories* in their original text from 1892's The Adventures of Sherlock Holmes have been recorded in Audiobook format from the first person perspective of John Watson, Paul Waggott retains the role as John. The Stories have not been adapted in order:

1. Mr. Sherlock Holmes*
2. A Scandal in Bohemia
3. The Red-Headed League
4. The Blue Carbuncle
5. A Case of Identity
6. The Man with the Twisted Lip
7. The Beryl Coronet

*As with the podcast, the first chapter of A Study in Scarlet "Mr Sherlock Holmes" is adapted as the pair's introduction, the full story does not continue and is not a part of 12-story collection currently being adapted.

===== Nightcaps =====
Starting in October 2025, as of November 2026, 7 Nightcaps have been posted. These are written "micro mysteries and mini adventures written by John". These stories are originals, not adapting the canon of Sherlock Holmes, currently the production team plan to release these as a book.

===== Live Shows =====
In September 2026, an original adventure called "The Dead Man's Hand", was performed live on stage at the Southbank Centre's Purcell Room, London, for two nights (5th & 6th) as part of "The Rest is Fest". Paul Waggott, Harry Attwell, and Marta da Silva reprise their roles as John, Sherlock, and Mariana respectively. 3 new characters for the adventure are introduced: Jemma Revell as Emily, Michael Lyle as Freddie, Thomas Mitchells as William. On September 15th, a recording of Saturday's (5th) show was released on Patreon.

== Reception ==
The podcast was reviewed by The Times critic Patricia Nicol as a "smash hit in filling the void left by the Benedict Cumberbatch drama".

== Awards ==
Sherlock & Co. won first place in the Pod Bible Listener Polls 2023 in the Audio Drama category. The podcast is also an ARIAS 2024 Silver award winner for "Best Drama" at The Radio Academy. The podcast was shortlisted in the "fiction" and "best new" categories at the British Podcast Awards 2024.

In 2025, the podcast won the People's Voice Webby Award
