= Howard K. Elcock =

British painter

- Born: 5 December 1886; Glasgow, Scotland
- Died: 4 March 1952 (aged 65); Fort Lauderdale, Florida, U.S.
- Occupation: Painter

Howard K. Elcock (5 December 1886 – 4 March 1952) was a British painter. His work was part of the painting event in the art competition at the 1932 Summer Olympics.
