= Ian Dickerson =

British writer, director and producer

Ian Dickerson (born 1969) is a British writer, director and producer. He has written about adaptations of Leslie Charteris's The Saint and Arthur Conan Doyle's Sherlock Holmes.

He directed Randall and Hopkirk (Revisited) for Network in 2007 and the following year acted as producer on the documentaries The Saint Steps In...To Television and The Saint Steps In...To Colour also for release on Network DVDs. He wrote, produced and directed The Saint Steps In...To the 70s for Network and these were subsequently combined and released as a standalone DVD entitled The Saint Steps In...To Television later that year.

His first book, The Saint on TV, was published by Hirst Publishing in 2011. Further books include The Saint on the Radio (Purview Press, May 2015), Who is the Falcon? (Purview Press, December 2016) and "A Saint I Ain't" (Chinbeard, 2019). He lives in Hampshire, England.

Dickerson wrote a book about US radio adaptations of Sherlock Holmes, titled Sherlock Holmes and His Adventures on American Radio (2019). He also published previously unreleased scripts from the 1940s radio series The New Adventures of Sherlock Holmes. Dickerson explained in a 2018 interview that he was given the scripts by the family of Leslie Charteris, the creator of the Saint who also wrote Sherlock Holmes radio scripts.
