= Bert Coules =

English writer

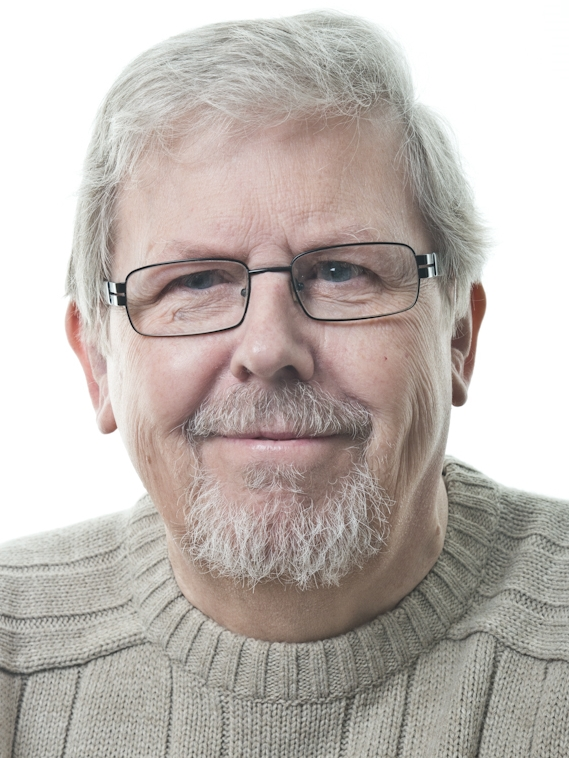
- Born: London, England
- Occupation: Playwright
- Writing career
- Genres: Radio, TV, stage
- Subjects: Science fiction Mystery

Bert Coules is an English writer, mainly for the BBC, who has produced a number of dramatisations and original works. He works mainly in radio drama but also writes for TV and the stage.

== Early years ==
Bert Coules worked in radio drama for ten years, gaining experience as a recording engineer, sound-effects technician, script reader and producer-director before becoming a full-time writer in 1989.

Coules began writing without any previous training, saying that he only heard a bad radio drama and felt he could do better. He wrote his first script in 1977 and had it accepted, a 45-minute docu-drama called "Wagner in Hell".

== Writing career ==
Coules specializes in mystery and science fiction audio and radio drama, and has written a number of dramatisations, most notably as the head writer of the Sherlock Holmes radio series (1989–1998) starring Clive Merrison as Holmes and Michael Williams as Watson (the first time the entire canon had been adapted with the same two lead actors throughout). He also wrote original Sherlock Holmes scripts for the following BBC radio series The Further Adventures of Sherlock Holmes, each based on an unexplained reference from the original stories. These were first broadcast between 2002 and 2010, and starred Andrew Sachs as Watson, following Michael Williams' death in 2001.

He has also written dramatisations of several of Ellis Peters' Brother Cadfael novels, starring Philip Madoc as Cadfael, and of works by Ian Rankin, Val McDermid, Isaac Asimov and other best-selling genre authors. He is an avowed Arthur Conan Doyle and Doctor Who fan.

In 2019, Coules wrote (with actor Tim Marriott) and directed a one-man one-act play, Watson: The Final Problem, which Marriott performed in Eastbourne, Brighton, and Edinburgh and continues to tour with great success around various venues in the UK and abroad. Separately, Coules has written a two act two-hander entitled Watson and Holmes, which consists of staged version of two of his previous radio scripts: "The Lion's Mane" and "The Abergavenny Murder".

Coules has penned a spec script for a 2-hour long television pilot entitled 221B based on the Holmes stories. By 2019, it was under option.

== Works ==
Original pieces include:

- The Further Adventures of Sherlock Holmes (four series) starring Clive Merrison and Andrew Sachs
- Fear on Four (three episodes)
- A Magician Amongst the Spirits (about the life of Harry Houdini)
- Watson: The Final Problem written with Tim Marriott, a one-man play based on stories and characters by Sir Arthur Conan Doyle

Dramatisations include:

- Flowers for Algernon: The Radio Play, starring Tom Courtenay
- A Wizard of Earthsea, starring Michael Maloney and Judi Dench
- Richard Hannay, starring David Robb:
  - "The Thirty-Nine Steps", with Tom Baker
  - "The Three Hostages", with Haydn Gwynne, Michael Malone and Clive Merrison
  - "Mr. Standfast", with Clive Merrison, Struan Rodger, Jasmine Hyde and Jon Glover
- Father Brown: The Secret Garden starring Richard Greenwood as Father Brown
- Mutiny on the Bounty, starring Oliver Reed as William Bligh and Linus Roache as Fletcher Christian
- The BBC's complete Sherlock Holmes - all four novels: A Study in Scarlet, The Sign of the Four, The Valley of Fear and The Hound of the Baskervilles, and twenty-four of the short stories, starring Clive Merrison as Holmes and Michael Williams as Watson.
- Rebus, starring Ron Donachie:
  - "Resurrection Men"
  - "The Falls"
- Brother Cadfael, starring Philip Madoc
  - "Monk's Hood"
  - "The Virgin in the Ice"
  - "Dead Man's Ransom"
- The Guns of Navarone, starring Toby Stephens
- An English Tragedy, an adaptation of the play by Ronald Harwood starring Geoffrey Streatfeild and Derek Jacobi
- Lost Empires adapted for the stage from the novel by J B Priestley
- So Much Blood, a Charles Paris story for The Saturday Play in 1999

== Television appearances ==
In 2008 Coules appeared in a television documentary titled Decoding Cadfael which detailed the process of producing the series.
