= Edith Meiser =

American author and actress (1898–1993)

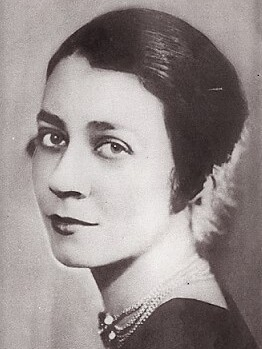
- From a 1930 Radio Digest magazine
- Born: May 9, 1898; Detroit, Michigan, U.S.
- Died: September 26, 1993 (aged 95); Manhattan, New York City, U.S.
- Occupation: Writer
- Writing career
- Language: English
- Genres: Crime, mystery

Edith Meiser (May 9, 1898 – September 26, 1993) was an American author and actress, who wrote mystery novels, stage plays, and numerous radio dramas. She is perhaps best known for bringing adaptations of Sherlock Holmes stories to radio in the 1930s. (Note: Quote - "On this day, Oct. 20, in 1930, Sherlock Holmes premiered on NBC radio, introducing the adventures of The Worlds Greatest Detective into Americas living rooms. Few figures loom larger in old-time radio mystery than Holmes, which featured some of the era's finest actors. The half-hour drama was the inspiration of Edith Meiser, an actress and mystery lover who was convinced the Sir Arthur Conan Doyle classics would make great listening.")

Meiser had been a member of the Actors Equity board of governors as well as the chairwoman of the Equity Library Theater.

== Early life ==
Meiser was born in Detroit. Her father, Edward Meiser, was a business executive at the Detroit Free Press newspaper for 57 years. She studied at the Liggett School, Kox Schule in Dresden, Germany, and the Ecole de la Cour de St. Pierre in Geneva, Switzerland, before eventually attending Vassar College.

== Acting career ==
At Vassar, Meiser began performing with the college drama society appearing in such plays as L'Aiglon, Jezebel, and Punishment, the last of which she authored herself.

After graduating college, Meiser began performing with such groups as the American Shakespeare Festival, The Theater Guild, Edward Albee's vaudeville circuit, and Jessie Bonstelle's Summer Stock Company before making her Broadway debut in 1923 in The New Way. She went on to appear in over 20 Broadway shows, including Fata Morgana, The Guardsman, Garrick Gaieties, Sabrina Fair and the 1960 production of The Unsinkable Molly Brown.

Meiser also appeared in films such as Middle of the Night, It Grows on Trees and Queen for a Day.

== Writing career ==
Meiser authored many radio scripts including Helen Hayes's first radio serial, The New Penny.

=== Sherlock Holmes ===
At age fifteen, Meiser traveled to Europe on the SS Bremen. The ship's purser provided Meiser with a copy of a Sherlock Holmes book which sparked her interest in the character.

Year later, Meiser and then-husband Tom McKnight made the leap from writing for the stage to writing for radio. After forming a company and finding some success in radio, Mesier decided that Sherlock Holmes would make for a very good radio program but she was unable to interest NBC in a series unless she found herself a sponsor. It took more than a year for Meiser to interest a sponsor in the idea. George C. L. Washington, inventor of the first instant coffee, and also a Holmesian, agreed to sponsor the series which became The Adventures of Sherlock Holmes.

The premiere episode featured an adaptation of "The Adventure of the Speckled Band" on October 20, 1930, and starred William Gillette as Sherlock Holmes and Leigh Lovell as Dr Watson. Further episodes featured Richard Gordon in the role of Holmes until 1933 and Louis Hector from 1934 to 1935 with Richard Gordon again taking over for the last season in 1936.

All episodes were adapted or devised by Meiser and at the end of the first season a survey of American radio editors found that 94% said The Adventures of Sherlock Holmes was the best radio program.

In 1935, Meiser authored a radio adaptation of Gillette's play, Sherlock Holmes. Gillette returned to the role opposite Reginald Mason as Dr Watson.

Three years after the end of The Adventures of Sherlock Holmes, the success of the Rathbone/Bruce Sherlock Holmes film series prompted Meiser to begin adapting and authoring stories for The New Adventures of Sherlock Holmes starring Basil Rathbone as Sherlock Holmes and Nigel Bruce as Dr Watson. From 1939 until 1943, all episodes were written by Meiser. Meiser left the show after disagreements with a sponsor over the amount of violence in the program.

Beginning in 1953, Meiser with co-writer Frank Giacoia authored a comic strip series of Sherlock Holmes adventures for the New York Herald Tribune Syndicate.

== Later life ==
In 1987, University of Minnesota Libraries purchased the "Edith Meiser Collection" which consisted of original scripts, tapes, and other material.

In 1991 at age 93, Meiser was invested as a member of The Baker Street Irregulars for her work in maintaining interest in Sherlock Holmes throughout her career.

== Death ==
Meiser died at age 95 in Roosevelt Hospital.

== Sources ==
- Boström, Mattias (2018). From Holmes to Sherlock. Mysterious Press. ISBN 978-0-8021-2789-1.
- Buck, Gertrude (1920). "The Community Theater's First Season". Vassar Quarterly. 5–6. Vassar College: 197.
- Bunson, Matthew (1997). Encyclopedia Sherlockiana. Simon & Schuster. ISBN 0-02-861679-0.
- Civitello, Michael (January 1, 1977). "Edith Meiser McKnight". Vassar Quarterly. LXXIII (2).
- Ellett, Ryan (2017). Radio Drama and Comedy Writers, 1928-1962. McFarland. ISBN 9781476629803.
- Eyles, Allen (1986). Sherlock Holmes: A Centenary Celebration. Harper & Row. ISBN 0-06-015620-1.
- Harrison, Geneva W. (1920). "Second Hall in Retrospect". Vassar Quarterly. 5–6. Vassar College: 199.
- Kitchell, Anna T. (1920). "The First Workshop Plays of 1919–1920". Vassar Quarterly. 5–6. Vassar College: 133–134.
- McCabe, Scott (October 20, 2010). "Crime History: Sherlock Holmes makes radio debut". Washington Examiner. ProQuest 759106946.
- Overmier, Judith A.; Harris Taylor, Rhonda (2014). Managing the Mystery Collection: From Creation to Consumption. Routledge. ISBN 978-1317717805.
- Simanaitis, Dennis (May 26, 2016). "Edith Meiser – Sherlockian Extraordinaire". Simanaitis Says.
- Wien, Gary (March 15, 2018). "Relive The Adventures of Sherlock Holmes With East Lynne Theater's Radio Play". NJ Stage Magazine.
