= Imagination Theatre =

American syndicated radio drama program

- Genre: Radio drama
- Country of origin: United States
- Language: English
- Home station: KIXI (since 2003)
- Created by: Jim French
- Original release: March 17, 1996
- Website: harrynile.com

Imagination Theatre is an American syndicated radio drama program airing on AM and FM radio stations across the United States. It features modern radio dramas. The program first aired in 1996. Originally produced by Jim French Productions, the program is now produced by Aural Vision, LLC.

Multiple radio series have aired as part of Imagination Theatre, the most popular of which are the two long-running mystery series The Adventures of Harry Nile and The Further Adventures of Sherlock Holmes.

== Production ==
The program was originally produced by Jim French and is based in Seattle. Its first show aired on March 17, 1996. In February 2017, Jim French Productions announced that it would be "retiring from production and closing its doors at the end of March." French died in December 2017 at age 89. In 2019, Lawrence "Larry" Albert and John Patrick Lowrie, both actors/producers on Imagination Theatre, launched a successful crowdfunding campaign to produce further episodes under the name "Aural Vision, LLC". An announcement about a new website was released in July 2019, and a longer statement about the return of Imagination Theatre was released in December 2019.

Many voice actors have guest starred on Imagination Theatre, and its regular actors play multiple roles across the program's various series. Several actors on the program have also voiced characters in video games, and some have done work for the same titles. For example, five actors who have performed on Imagination Theatre (Lowrie, Rick May, Dennis Bateman, Gary Schwartz, and Ellen McLain) voiced characters in the video game Team Fortress 2.

Most of the episodes are approximately a half-hour long (with commercials), though some episodes are double-length. The program has aired a few special broadcasts including characters from more than one of its series, for example "The Third Gate", a 2005 episode celebrating the 500th week of Imagination Theatre which featured characters from multiple series. Previously broadcast on Seattle-area stations KIRO (1996–1999) and KNWX (1999–2003), the program has aired on the radio station KIXI since 2003. Additionally, the show is broadcast on other radio stations in different regions of the United States. Broadcasts of the show on KIXI are also streamed online. Some episodes of The Adventures of Harry Nile, The Further Adventures of Sherlock Holmes, and The Classic Adventures of Sherlock Holmes air on SiriusXM's Radio Classics channel. Imagination Theatre is sometimes recorded live in front of an audience at the Kirkland Performance Center.

== Series ==
=== The Adventures of Harry Nile ===
The Adventures of Harry Nile (1976–present) is a radio series that first aired as part of Imagination Theatre in 1996. It features Harry Nile, a fictional American detective in Los Angeles and later Seattle. It has 312 episodes as of December 2020. The series takes place from the 1940s to the 1960s. The character and series were created by Jim French. Harry Nile is a private detective who is not rich or famous but has integrity. He is assisted on his cases by Murphy, an intelligent former librarian. Nile was formerly a cop in Chicago; his real last name was Niletti, but he changed it before he joined the police force to protect his family from potential retaliation from the Mob. Jim French explained the origins of Harry Nile's name: "It's a twisted anagram of 'Harry Lime', a favorite character from the film The Third Man. Originally, I thought I'd make Harry Nile a more mysterious character than he finally came to be."

The first four episodes aired as part of Jim French's anthology radio series Crisis. The first episode of The Adventures of Harry Nile aired in Crisis in 1976 and aired again under the new series title The Adventures of Harry Nile in 1977. The series had a 12-year hiatus from mid-1978 to late 1990. A sub-series titled War Comes to Harry Nile (2007–2016) aired as part of The Adventures of Harry Nile, and follows the title character's adventures during World War II. There are 18 episodes in War Comes to Harry Nile. As of 2019, six episodes of The Adventures of Harry Nile are new productions of previously used scripts. For instance, episode 124, "Little Boy Lost" (2000), is a re-working of episode 34, "The Case of The Midnight Caller" (1992).

Harry Nile was voiced by Phil Harper through episode 156 (which aired in 2004), and has been played by Lawrence Albert since episode 157 (2005). The character Murphy, portrayed by Pat French through episode 230 (2011) and by Mary Anne Dorward from episode 232 (2011), has been played by Mary Kae Irvin since episode 294 (2017). The series has multiple recurring characters, including fictional police officers and detectives in Los Angeles and Seattle, members of Harry Nile's family, and several war-time characters. Pat French played a variety of roles in the early episodes before Murphy became a recurring character. The series announcers have included Jay Green, Terry Rose, Jack Spencer, and Jim French.

There are fifteen double-length episodes in the series as of 2019, including two episodes of War Comes To Harry Nile. Though many episodes of Imagination Theatre have been recorded live, a Harry Nile episode, "The Case of the Blue Leather Chair," was one of only two Jim French shows broadcast live. The episode and a stand-alone show, "Moving Day", were broadcast live on New Year's Eve 1995.

The magazine AudioFile published a review in 2006 of the collection The History of Harry Nile, Volume 11. The reviewer described the series as "new old-time radio" and Harry Nile as "the kinder, gentler private eye of Seattle radio". AudioFile also published a review in 2016 of the five-episode serial You Shouldn't Detour Off Route 66, in which the reviewer commented that the serial reflected "the noir style, pace, and sound effects of old-time radio" and was "easygoing family entertainment". John V. Pavlik wrote in a 2017 book that the series is among shows setting "the standard for contemporary digital audio dramatic quality".

=== The Further Adventures of Sherlock Holmes ===
The Further Adventures of Sherlock Holmes (1998–present) is a radio series featuring the fictional detective Sherlock Holmes, created by Arthur Conan Doyle. The series has 168 episodes as of September 2024 (not including The Classic Adventures of Sherlock Holmes). The episodes are pastiches written by the series creator, Jim French, as well as M. J. Elliott and other writers. Before the start of the series, French obtained permission from the estate of Jean Conan Doyle to use Sherlock Holmes, Dr. Watson, and other characters in radio dramas.

In The Further Adventures of Sherlock Holmes, Sherlock Holmes was portrayed by John Gilbert through episode 18 (which aired in 2000), and has been played by John Patrick Lowrie since episode 21 (2001). Dr. Watson is portrayed by Lawrence Albert. Rick May played Inspector Lestrade from 1998 through 2020; the last two episodes with Rick May were recorded in late 2019 but were first broadcast in May 2020. Leonore "Lee" Paasch played Mrs. Hudson from 1998 through 2013. Ellen McLain has played Mrs. Hudson since episode 137 (2019). Mycroft Holmes has been portrayed by Frank Buxton (in one 1998 episode), Ted D'Arms (2000–2006), and Terry Edward Moore (since 2011). The announcer is mainly Dennis Bateman. Lowrie was the announcer for the early episodes which featured Gilbert as Holmes.

Other characters created by Doyle make multiple appearances in the series, including Inspector Gregson, Inspector Hopkins, Inspector MacDonald, and Mary Morstan Watson. Dr. Watson is married (and widowed) three times in the timeline of the series, Mary Morstan being his second wife. Two brothers of Professor Moriarty, Colonel Moriarty and Mr. Moriarty (a station master), appear as villains. All three brothers are named James Moriarty.

The series has thirteen double-length episodes as of 2019, such as "The Adventure of the Borgia Ring" (2012) and "The Adventure of the Irregular Client" (2013). Some episodes are based on miscellaneous stories by Arthur Conan Doyle. "How Watson Learned the Trick" (2008) was based on "How Watson Learned the Trick", "The Lady Sannox Investigation" (2008) was based on "The Case of Lady Sannox", "The Adventure of the Parisian Assassin" (2011) was based on "The Lost Special", and "The Addleton Tragedy" (2012) was based on "The Man with the Watches".

Eleven scripts for the series The Further Adventures of Sherlock Holmes written by M. J. Elliott were published in the book Sherlock Holmes on the Air in 2012. A different book with a similar title, Sherlock Holmes On the Air!, was published in 2016 with scripts for two episodes of the series by Steven Philip Jones and two by M. J. Elliott. A collection of scripts written by multiple writers for the series was published in 2017 in the book Imagination Theatre's Sherlock Holmes, with all royalties donated for the preservation of Undershaw. All the scripts written by Jim French for the series were published in a three-volume set in 2019, with all royalties again being donated for the preservation of Undershaw.

In a review of the series published in Sherlock Holmes Mystery Magazine in 2009, Carole Buggé praised the performances of the main cast, and wrote that the incidental music in the series by Michael Lynch "is excellent, and serves to highlight the action and drama of the stories". In their 2012 book The Sherlock Holmes Miscellany, Roger Johnson and Jean Upton wrote that Lowrie brings an "incisive authority" to the character of Holmes. In a review written for the publication of the scripts by Jim French, The Sherlock Holmes Society of London wrote, referencing the 1940s radio series The New Adventures of Sherlock Holmes, that The Further Adventures of Sherlock Holmes is "gratifyingly reminiscent of the days when listeners tuned in every week to hear Rathbone and Bruce as Holmes and Watson. The main difference is that IT's Watson, played by Lawrence Albert, is not only brave and loyal, but intelligent."

=== The Classic Adventures of Sherlock Holmes ===
The Classic Adventures of Sherlock Holmes (2005–2016) is a series of radio adaptations of all 60 of Arthur Conan Doyle's Sherlock Holmes stories, and aired on Imagination Theatre in addition to the other series The Further Adventures of Sherlock Holmes. The stories were all adapted by M. J. Elliott. The dramatizations were recorded and aired in a different order than the original stories were published. For instance, the first episode is based on the short story "The Adventure of the Yellow Face".

The series has 64 episodes, including the multi-part adaptations of the novels The Hound of the Baskervilles (3 episodes), The Valley of Fear (2 episodes), and The Sign of Four (3 episodes). A double-length episode, "The Return of Sherlock Holmes", combines Doyle's short stories "The Final Problem" and "The Adventure of the Empty House". The episodes based on A Study in Scarlet and "The Adventure of the Speckled Band" are also double-length, as are the episodes adapted from The Hound of the Baskervilles and The Valley of Fear.

John Patrick Lowrie and Lawrence Albert, who play Holmes and Watson respectively in The Further Adventures of Sherlock Holmes, played the same roles in The Classic Adventures of Sherlock Holmes. Also in the cast were Lee Paasch as Mrs. Hudson, Rick May as Inspector Lestrade, John Murray as Inspector Tobias Gregson, and William Hamer and Jeffrey Hitchin as Inspector Stanley Hopkins. The announcer was Dennis Bateman.

AudioFile published a review of the series in 2016. The reviewer wrote that "John Patrick Lowrie skillfully portrays a humbler and more humorous Holmes while Lawrence Albert's Dr. Watson is wiser and even occasionally gets Holmes out of a jam", and added that "Lee Paasch is fun as the long-suffering Mrs. Hudson, who is more outspoken in these performances".

=== The Hilary Caine Mysteries ===
The Hilary Caine Mysteries (2005–present) is a radio series about the fictional investigator Hilary Caine, an independent young woman who has the ability to investigate cases using a reasoned train of thought. The series has 22 episodes. Imagination Theatre writer M. J. Elliott created the Hilary Caine character. The series takes place in the 1930s. Hilary Caine is employed by the English tabloid Tittle-Tattle Magazine as an investigator. Her cases are published in the magazine under the banner of Hilary Caine, Girl Detective, all rewritten by the magazine staff to remove Hilary's various personality quirks and present her in the most positive light. As a result of living a real and imaginary life, Hilary is apparently confused on occasion about where fact ends and fiction begins. For instance, she sometimes claims to have met famous fictional detectives such as Sherlock Holmes. After the show's 22nd episode, released in 2017, the series went on hiatus until it was announced in 2020 that it will return with a new actress in the lead role.

Hilary Caine was played by Karen Heaven through 2017. It was announced that the character will be played by Mari Nelson in future episodes. The cast also includes Randy Hoffmeyer as Inspector Julius Finn and Lawrence Albert as Sgt. Talmadge. The announcer is Rachel Glass. The series has four double-length episodes: "The Bitter End" (2007), "Seek and Ye Shall Find" (2011), "A Multitude of Sins" (2014), and "Dead to the World" (2015).

=== Raffles, the Gentleman Thief ===
Raffles, the Gentleman Thief (2004–present) is a radio series following the adventures of fictional gentleman thief A. J. Raffles, created by E. W. Hornung in 1898. The series has 20 episodes as of October 2020. It features both dramatisations of some of Hornung's stories, adapted by M. J. Elliott, and new pastiches written by Elliott, Jim French, and John Hall. The first episode, "The Ides of March", was adapted from the first Raffles story, "The Ides of March". Raffles recruits his friend Bunny Manders as his accomplice in the first episode. Their main adversary in the series is police detective Inspector Mackenzie, who is assisted by policeman Sergeant Clyde.

The cast includes John Armstrong as A. J. Raffles, Dennis Bateman as Bunny Manders, Lawrence Albert as Inspector Mackenzie, and Gary Schwartz as Sergeant Clyde. The announcer is Lawrence Albert. Sergeant Clyde is an original creation of the radio series and is implied by references in the first episode, "The Ides of March", to have been named after Jeremy Clyde, who voiced Raffles in the BBC radio series Raffles. Raffles, the Gentleman Thief does not have any double-length episodes.

Raffles and Bunny appear in an episode of The Further Adventures of Sherlock Holmes, "The Singular Affair of the Persian Diadem" (2005), in which Holmes and Watson guard a valuable tiara from Raffles and Bunny. Mycroft Holmes (voiced by Ted D'Arms) coerces Raffles and Bunny to recover a missing document in an episode of Raffles, the Gentleman Thief, "An Affair of State" (2007), with Sherlock Holmes making a cameo appearance.

=== Kincaid, the StrangeSeeker ===
Kincaid, the StrangeSeeker (1996–2014) is a radio series about fictional investigator Michael Kincaid. The series has 47 episodes and was created by Jim French. Originally, Michael Kincaid is employed as a television investigative reporter by a fictional cable news station, The Investigative Channel, and works with Shelly Mars, his videographer. Kincaid's first boss in the series is Fred "Lippy" Lippman, and his second boss is Randall "Biggy" Bigelow. The channel's building is destroyed later in the series in "The Beginning of the Beginning" (2012) and it is revealed by Randolph Carter of Miskatonic University (a fictional institution that first appeared in the stories of H. P. Lovecraft) that the channel was owned by the University. Kincaid, Shelly, and Bigelow are offered jobs with the University, and Kincaid investigates psychic and supernatural phenomena for the institution.

The cast included Terry Rose as Michael Kincaid, Kathryn Shield as Shelly Mars, John Gilbert as Fred "Lippy" Lippman, Richard Sanders as Randall "Biggy" Bigelow, and Terry Edward Moore as Randolph Carter. The announcers were Dean L. Smith and Jim French. The series has four double-length episodes: "The Hollow Men" (2004), "High Stakes" (2008), "Hell On Earth" (2010), and "The Beginning of the Beginning" (2012).

=== Kerides, The Thinker ===
Kerides, The Thinker (2006–2016) is a mystery radio series set in Alexandria, Egypt in approximately 276 BC. The series has 18 episodes. It was created by writers Iain McLaughlin and Claire Bartlett. The central characters of the series are Kerides, a young Greek scholar who uses observation and logical thinking to solve crimes, and Adrea, an outspoken former slave. Kerides's ability to solve crimes earns him the attention and patronage of Pharaoh's Grand Vizier and the commander of the Palace Guard. Recurring characters include Mentep, the Pharaoh's Grand Vizier, General Karnak, the general in charge of Pharaoh's palace security, and Armarna, Adrea's mother.

The cast featured Ulric Dihle as Kerides, Sarah Schenkkan as Adrea, Stephan Weyte as Mentep, David White and Steve Manning as General Karnak, and Mary Anne Dorward as Armarna. The announcers were Jim French and Lawrence Albert. Two episodes of the series are double-length: "Return of the Queen" (2012) and "Until Death Do Us Part" (2014). The character Erimem, who appears in the episode "Return of the Queen", originally appeared in "The Eye of the Scorpion", an audio drama by Big Finish Productions based on the television series Doctor Who.

=== Murder and the Murdochs ===
Murder and the Murdochs is a comedy-mystery radio series that debuted in March 2020. Set in modern New York, the series follows fictional private detectives Maxine Murdoch and her daughter Piper. The series is written by M. J. Elliott. It stars Cynthia Lauren Tewes as Maxine and Andee Albert as Piper.

=== Short series ===
Several short radio series have aired on the program, including Mr. Darnborough Investigates (2005–2015, 3 episodes, starring David Natale as amateur detective Freddie Darnborough and Gary Schwartz as his valet Cecil), Phoenix Rising (2005–2019, 6 episodes, starring Caitlin Frances as police detective Dena Rising), and The Chronicles of Anthony Rathe (2006–2019, 6 episodes, starring Terry Edward Moore as retired criminal lawyer Anthony Rathe). Many stand-alone shows have also aired on Imagination Theatre.
