= Tales of Terror and Mystery =

Collection of stories by Arthur Conan Doyle

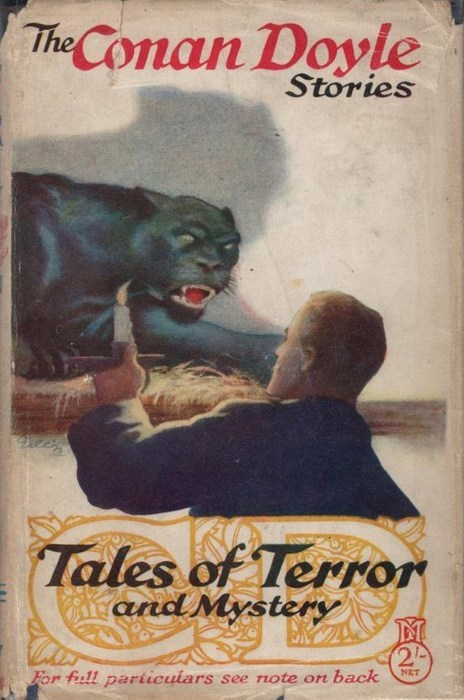
- The first edition cover of Tales of Terror and Mystery, featuring a scene from "The Brazilian Cat".
- Author: Sir Arthur Conan Doyle
- Language: English
- Genre: Short story collection
- Publisher: John Murray
- Publication date: 12 July 1922
- Publication place: United Kingdom

Tales of Terror and Mystery is a short story collection by Arthur Conan Doyle, first published on 12 July 1922. The collection comprises 12 stories: six "tales of terror" and six "tales of mystery". In autumn 1925, it was published in the United States by George H. Doran Company as The Black Doctor and Other Tales of Terror and Mystery.

== Contents ==
- Tales of Terror
  - "The Horror of the Heights" (originally published in The Strand Magazine in 1913)
  - "The Leather Funnel" (originally published in McClure's in 1902)
  - "The New Catacomb" (originally published in The Sunlight Year-Book in 1898 as "Burger's Secret")
  - "The Case of Lady Sannox" (originally published in The Idler in 1893)
  - "The Terror of Blue John Gap" (originally published in The Strand Magazine in 1910)
  - "The Brazilian Cat" (originally published in The Strand Magazine in 1898 as "The Story of the Brazilian Cat")
- Tales of Mystery
  - "The Lost Special" (originally published in The Strand Magazine in 1898 as "The Story of the Lost Special")
  - "The Beetle-Hunter" (originally published in The Strand Magazine in 1898 as "The Story of the Beetle Hunter")
  - "The Man with the Watches" (originally published in The Strand Magazine in 1899 as "The Story of the Man with the Watches")
  - "The Japanned Box" (originally published in The Strand Magazine in 1899 as "The Story of the Japanned Box")
  - "The Black Doctor" (originally published in The Strand Magazine in 1898 as "The Story of the Black Doctor")
  - "The Jew's Breastplate" (originally published in The Strand Magazine in 1899 as "The Story of the Jew's Breast-Plate")

== Reception ==
Writing for The Guardian in 2014, Lynne Truss named Tales of Terror and Mystery, as one of her "top 10 gothic novels", singling out "The Brazilian Cat".
