= 710 ESPN Radio =

710 ESPN may refer to:

- KSPN (AM), licensed to Los Angeles, California, United States
- KIRO (AM), licensed to Seattle, Washington, United States
