= Phil Harper =

American actor

Phillip J. Harper (March 18, 1940 – October 11, 2004) was an American voice actor best known as the eponymous hero in the radio serial The Adventures of Harry Nile for more than 27 years.

Harper grew up in Flossmoor, Illinois. He joined the United States Army in 1962 and was assigned to a radio station in Berlin.

He returned in 1965 and began work as a disc jockey. After being cast in about a dozen radio plays written by Jim French at KIRO (AM), French created the first of 158 episodes of The Adventures of Harry Nile in 1976.
