= Erica C. Barnett =

American journalist

Erica Barnett
- Born: September 15, 1977 (age 49); Texas, U.S.
- Education: University of Texas at Austin (BA)
- Occupation: Journalist
- Years active: 1998–current
- Known for: Crowdsourced investigative and advocacy journalism
- Notable work: Quitter: A Memoir of Drinking, Relapse, and Recovery (2020)
- Website: publicola.com

Erica Christine Barnett (born September 15, 1977) is an American journalist and blogger who covers the city of Seattle. She is known locally within Seattle for her crowdsourced journalism in Seattle.

Viking Press released her book Quitter: A Memoir of Drinking, Relapse, and Recovery on July 7, 2020.

== Early life and education ==
Barnett is from Texas. She admired advocacy journalists Molly Ivins and Hunter S Thompson, and attended the University of Texas at Austin from 1995 through 1999, graduating with a BA in philosophy.

== Career ==
From 1998 to 2001, Barnett was a senior news editor and columnist for The Austin Chronicle, and then spent two years at the Seattle Weekly before moving to The Stranger, where she served as a staff writer until 2009. While there, she received a Civic Award from the Municipal League of King County for best government affairs reporting. The Seattle Post-Intelligencer praised her efforts to document the connection between Washington State House Speaker Frank Chopp and the Building Industry Association of Washington during the 2008 Washington gubernatorial election.

In 2011, Seattle Magazine named her one of Seattle's 'most influential people'. In 2012, Barnett launched the news website PubliCola.com with her co-editor and co-owner Josh Feit. She has also written for Crosscut.com and been featured on Seattle National Public Radio affiliate KUOW. From April 2015 through April 2017 Barnett was Communications Director of NARAL Pro-Choice Washington.

In February 2016 Barnett reported on the proceedings of online meetings held on Nextdoor.com by Seattle's police chief and other officials with Nextdoor.com users, describing an echo-chamber atmosphere, and what Seattle Mayor Ed Murray called "paranoid hysteria" about crime in well-off neighborhoods. The social networking site responded by temporarily suspending Barnett's account, for violating their terms of service to keep user comments private, while Barnett said Washington's open meeting laws took precedence, requiring records of meetings with public officials like the police chief to be accessible to the public. Barnett's reporting caused a wider debate on Nextdoor.com's role and led to city officials reevaluating its relationship with Nextdoor, as well as diminishing Nextdoor's goals of expanding its role with governments nationwide.

While writing for TheAtlantic.com later in 2016, she erroneously accused Seattle radio's Ron & Don Show of encouraging listeners to harass a city council member after a contentious sports vote eliminating the possibility of a new sports arena. The Atlantic retracted the story after it and Barnett were sued for defamation.

In April 2018, Barnett obtained and reported on King County's draft homelessness plan. In June 2019, Barnett broke the news of The Seattle Times reporter Mike Rosenberg's resignation over sexual harassment allegations. In December 2018, Barnett was first to report that Seattle Mayor Jenny Durkan's office had made a $720,000 no-bid consulting contract with a consulting firm to represent the city's interest in Sound Transit 3 negotiations. In July 2019, Barnett was first to report a letter by Seattle's Human Services Director to administrators of programs funded by Seattle's soda tax that their funding could be cut. In October 2019, Barnett was first to report the unexplained blocks of time in Seattle traffic consultant Mike Worden's calendar as City Council members were raising questions as to exactly what the Mayor was paying Worden to do.

Her memoir was published by Viking in 2020. The book analyzes the alcoholism recovery industry, including a critical attitude toward Alcoholics Anonymous, but Barnett partially credits its approach of "cognitive behavioral therapy in a very disorganized manner" for helping her to become sober, an "ex-drinker," in 2015.

== Works ==
- Quitter: A Memoir of Drinking, Relapse, and Recovery (2020)
- Articles at The Stranger
- Articles at Crosscut.com
