= The Empty Hearse =

- Sherlock episode
- Episode no.: Series 3 Episode 1
- Directed by: Jeremy Lovering
- Written by: Mark Gatiss
- Based on: "The Adventure of the Empty House" and "The Lost Special" by Arthur Conan Doyle
- Cinematography by: Steve Lawes
- Editing by: Charlie Phillips
- Original air date: 1 January 2014
- Running time: 86 minutes

Guest appearances
- Andrew Scott as Jim Moriarty; Lars Mikkelsen as Charles Augustus Magnussen; Jonathan Aris as Philip Anderson; Lisa McAllister as Anthea; Timothy Carlton as Sherlock's father; Wanda Ventham as Sherlock's mother; David Fynn as Howard Shilcott; Derren Brown as himself

Episode chronology
← Previous "The Reichenbach Fall"	Next → "The Sign of Three"

"The Empty Hearse" is the first episode of the third series of the BBC television series Sherlock. It was written by Mark Gatiss and stars Benedict Cumberbatch as Sherlock Holmes, Martin Freeman as Dr John Watson, and Mark Gatiss as Mycroft Holmes. It also marks the first appearance of Amanda Abbington as Mary Morstan and Lars Mikkelsen as Charles Augustus Magnussen.

Inspired by "The Adventure of the Empty House" and "The Lost Special" by Sir Arthur Conan Doyle, the episode follows Sherlock Holmes' return to London and reunion with John Watson, along with an underground terrorist network. The episode was first broadcast on BBC One and Channel One on 1 January 2014. It garnered a viewership of 12.7 million people and received positive reviews.

== Plot ==
Two years after his supposed death (depicted in "The Reichenbach Fall"), Sherlock Holmes has been completely absolved of the slanderous accusations against him originated by Jim Moriarty and secretly returns to London to help his brother Mycroft uncover an apparently imminent terrorist attack. An interleaved scene shows a version of how Sherlock might have faked his death: by jumping from the roof with a bungee cable, bouncing back and entering the building through a window, leaving Moriarty's body with a Sherlock mask to mislead John and other onlookers, John himself being hypnotised by Derren Brown to give the time for this to be set up. This version of events is quickly shown to be a conspiracy theory invented by Philip Anderson, who feels responsible for Sherlock's death.

John now has a girlfriend, Mary Morstan, to whom he intends to propose in a restaurant. At this point, Sherlock, disguised as a French waiter, approaches the couple but is not immediately recognised by John. When Sherlock reveals his identity, John attacks him three times in three different locations. When John refuses to accept his explanations, Sherlock enlists Molly to assist him in his next case, that of an underground skeleton behind a desk containing a manuscript: How I Did It by Jack the Ripper, revealed toward the end of the episode to be a fake planted by Anderson to lure Sherlock out of hiding. Later that day, Mary receives a text in a skip code (first and every three words) telling her that John has been kidnapped by unknown assailants and will die if he is not rescued in time, along with a coded location. Sherlock and Mary come to his rescue on a motorcycle and manage to drag him out of a lit bonfire on which a "guy" (Guy Fawkes effigy) was about to be burned.

Sherlock is shown a video by a London Underground employee of the mysterious vanishing of a passenger from a train between two stations near Parliament and later identifies the passenger as a member of the House of Lords, Lord Moran, whom he knows to be a foreign agent and who has been acting unusually. He notices that it is not only Moran who vanished but an entire carriage of the train and deduces that the attack will be on the Houses of Parliament, which will be holding a late-night hearing on a new anti-terrorism bill on Guy Fawkes Night, 5 November. Sherlock and John enter the abandoned station near Parliament, finding the secretly diverted carriage. It is rigged with explosives to make an enormous bomb. Sherlock manages to defuse the bomb by turning the off-switch, but not before making John believe the bomb can't be defused, leading Sherlock to apologize to John for getting him involved and saying that John would have had a future if he hadn't come back. This all had the intended effect of causing John to panic and reveal to Sherlock how much he has missed him, to John's later embarrassment.

Another scene intercut with the above shows Sherlock visiting Anderson. He reveals how he faked his death as part of a scheme to convince Moriarty of his lost credibility and demise. The plan allowed the Holmes brothers to dissolve Moriarty's network successfully. Sherlock tells Anderson that he and Mycroft had anticipated thirteen possible scenarios that could happen on the roof, and that while John's view was obstructed, members of his Homeless Network rolled out an inflatable mattress and took their roles as shocked bystanders and paramedics. With the aid of a squash ball under his arm to temporarily stop his pulse, Sherlock convincingly faked his death. Anderson casts doubt on the integrity of this version of events, arguing it would be nearly impossible to ensure John remained exactly where Sherlock wanted. Anderson points out that he is "the last person" Sherlock would tell, but as he turns around, the room is empty. Anderson then begins tearing his theories from the wall, laughing hysterically, and the intercut scene ends.

Moran is ambushed by the police and arrested after leaving his hotel suite. John asks Sherlock who abducted him and why, questions for which Sherlock has no answers yet. In the final scene, a bespectacled man with blue eyes is seen observing footage of Sherlock and Mary rescuing John from the fire.

== Sources ==
=== The Adventure of the Empty House ===
The most obvious source of this episode, to which its title alludes, is "The Adventure of the Empty House", in which Sherlock Holmes returns from his "Great Hiatus", having allowed everyone to believe him dead to root out the rest of Moriarty's criminal organisation. In both the story and the episode, Mycroft helps Sherlock fake his demise. The villainous Moran in this episode is named after Colonel Sebastian Moran, the villain of the original story. In "The Adventure of the Empty House", Watson first encounters Holmes disguised as a heavily accented and bearded book salesman with a shop on the corner of Church Street, who offers Watson some books. In the episode, John encounters a man as his patient who owns a DVD shop at the same location; the man offers to sell him pornographic DVDs with titles almost identical to the books Watson was offered by the disguised Holmes in the short story ("Tree Worshippers", "British Birds", "Catalysts", and "Holy War"). John falsely assumes it is Sherlock in disguise, with embarrassing results. It is also a reference to a scene from The Spider Woman starring Basil Rathbone and Nigel Bruce. Moffat and Gatiss have cited the film series as another source of inspiration when writing Sherlock. The remainder of the episode's storyline is largely original.

Sherlock Holmes alludes to a "system of Japanese wrestling" as the second of thirteen scenarios that might have allowed him to survive his rooftop encounter with Moriarty. This is a reference to the fictional martial art of "baritsu" which was used by Holmes to defeat Moriarty in the original story.

=== Other Conan Doyle short stories ===
Apart from "The Adventure of the Empty House", the episode contains allusions to many other Conan Doyle short stories:

- Sherlock calls Lord Moran by the code name "giant rat of Sumatra Road" because of his status as a mole for North Korea, a reference to "the giant rat of Sumatra" mentioned in passing in "The Adventure of the Sussex Vampire" and because Moran's planned terrorist attack involves an abandoned section of the London Underground system called "Sumatra Road".
  - In "The Adventure of the Reigate Squire", Watson mentions in passing the case of the "Netherland-Sumatra Company and of the colossal schemes of Baron Maupertuis." The episode references this and the repeated mention of "Sumatra" by similarly featuring a member of the House of Lords, Lord Moran, as the scheming villain. Furthermore, in the beginning of the episode, after Sherlock and Mycroft have returned to London from Serbia, Mycroft mentions Baron Maupertuis by name.
- At one point, John asks the bearded man selling DVDs if his usual GP is named "Dr Verner", who, in "The Adventure of the Norwood Builder", is a cousin of Sherlock Holmes who buys Watson's practice so he can move back into his old rooms on Baker Street upon Holmes' return.
- Sherlock refers to an unseen character called Professor Presbury and "monkey glands", both from the story "The Adventure of the Creeping Man".
- In "The Adventure of the Greek Interpreter", the first story to feature Sherlock's brother Mycroft Holmes, Sherlock mentions that his grandmother was the sister of the French artist Horace Vernet. The fact that Holmes impersonates a French waiter at the beginning of the episode may be a reference to his French heritage. The scene where Sherlock and Mycroft try to out-deduce each other in Sherlock's flat is also a reference to a scene from "The Greek Interpreter" where they engage in a similar competition while sitting in Mycroft's Diogenes Club.
  - Sherlock and Mycroft's competition is over analysing a particular knitted hat, a reference to "The Adventure of the Blue Carbuncle" where Holmes also deduced several facts about a man from his hat. Furthermore, in the episode, when Mycroft determines that the knitted hat belonged to a man, Sherlock asks, "Why, size of the hat?", to which Mycroft reproachingly replies, "Don't be silly. Some women have large heads, too." Sherlock's subsequent look of guilt is a satirical allusion to the controversial and pseudoscientific phrenology involved in the original short story, where Sherlock Holmes deduced that the owner of the hat was intelligent based on the size of his head, remarking "a man with so large a brain must have something in it."
- The episode features John's engagement to Mary Morstan, who appears in the novel The Sign of the Four. Mary is seen reading John's blog, and the passage she reads aloud is an almost verbatim excerpt from chapter six of The Sign of the Four ("[s]o swift, silent, and furtive were his movements, like those of a trained bloodhound picking out a scent...").
- At one point, Mary receives a text message on her mobile phone that starts with the phrase "John or James Watson", a reference to "The Man With the Twisted Lip", in which Mary calls her husband "James" rather than John (prompting the fan theory that his middle initial stands for "Hamish", a variant of James, a theory incorporated into the earlier episode "A Scandal in Belgravia").
- Mary says that the above-mentioned text message is a skip code, a type of code where each word of the secret message is given as every third word of the apparent message, a reference to "The Adventure of the Gloria Scott" where Holmes shows and explains to Watson a message with the same type of code. (That Mary knows it is a skip code contributes to Sherlock later identifying her true identity.)
- In a short scene, Sherlock very quickly solves an adaptation of "A Case of Identity" when a young woman consults him about the disappearance of her online boyfriend, determining that it was in fact her stepfather who had posed as her online boyfriend to break her heart, keep her at home in grief, and maintain control over her finances. Mere moments after first hearing the woman's story, Sherlock promptly tells her stepfather, who has feigned concern and joined her in consulting him, that he is "a complete and utter pisspot", alluding to Holmes's reprimand of the man in the original short story.
- The episode also references the Conan Doyle story "The Lost Special", in which a train goes missing into an unused section of the railway, and which features an unnamed character who might be Sherlock Holmes, referred to simply as "an amateur reasoner of some celebrity".

== Production ==
=== Casting ===
Many of the cast of the previous two series returned, with Benedict Cumberbatch and Martin Freeman playing Sherlock Holmes and Doctor John Watson. Freeman's then real-life partner Amanda Abbington joined the cast as Mary Morstan, Watson's girlfriend. Cumberbatch's parents, Wanda Ventham and Timothy Carlton, had cameos as Sherlock's parents.

=== Writing ===
"The Empty Hearse" was written by the series' co-creator, Mark Gatiss. He was inspired to use the London Underground as a setting by the 1968 Doctor Who serial The Web of Fear, a story which is primarily set in the Underground after London is evacuated due to the spread of a deadly web-like fungus via the Tube network.

=== Filming ===
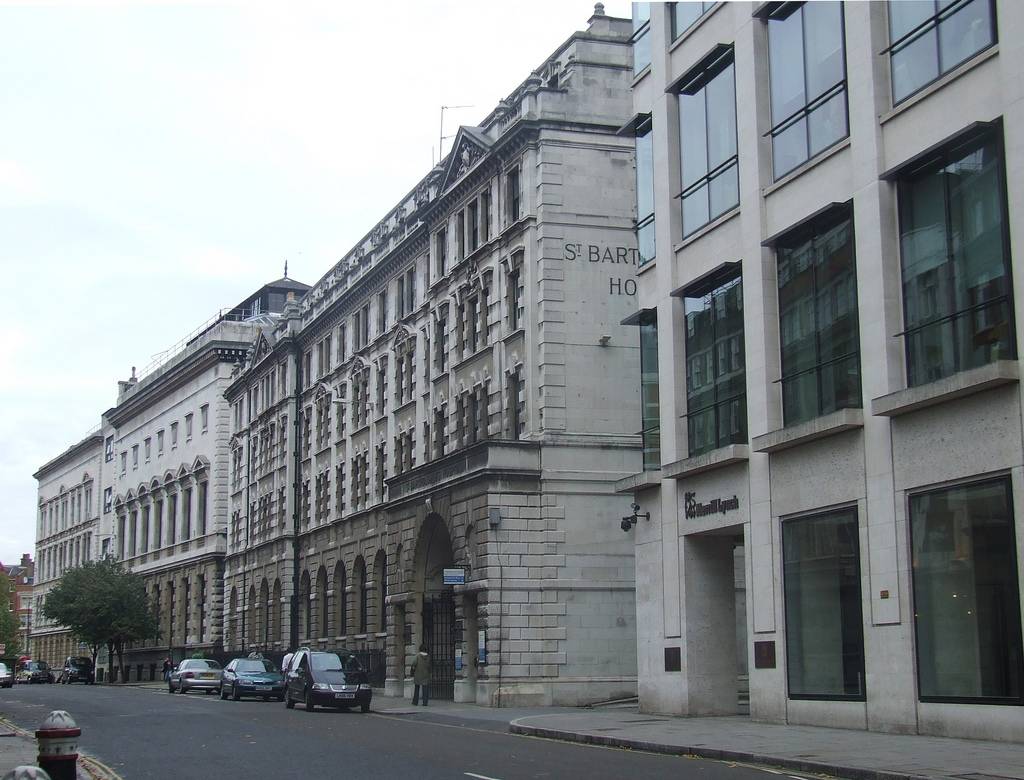
The resolution to how Holmes had faked his death was filmed in April 2013 at St Bart's Hospital

The resolution to how Holmes had faked his death at the end of "The Reichenbach Fall" was filmed in April 2013 at St Bart's Hospital in London. The filming was attended by several hundred fans, whom producer Sue Vertue begged not to leak too much information. Telegraph journalist Sheryl Garratt reported that the filming was deliberately confusing to the watching fans, and the explanation of how Sherlock faked his death was blanked in the script.

The London Underground train used in the episode was built from scratch by the production to look like a District line carriage, as they were unable to acquire a real train. The never completed tube station called Sumatra Road is based on North End tube station. Filming was carried out at Westminster and Charing Cross stations.

== Broadcast and reception ==
"The Empty Hearse" was first publicly exhibited at a special screening at the BFI Southbank in London on 15 December 2013. The screening was followed by a Q&A, hosted by Caitlin Moran, attended by the show's creators and key cast members.

The episode was first broadcast on BBC One on 1 January 2014. According to overnight figures, the episode was viewed by 9.2 million people in the UK on BBC One, with the viewership peaking at 9.7 million in the first 5 minutes. It premiered in the US on PBS as part of Masterpiece Mystery! on 19 January 2014.

"The Empty Hearse" received critical acclaim upon broadcast, with The Guardian's Sam Wollaston proclaiming "...an explosive return for Cumberbatch and Freeman, full of fizz, whizz and wit." Similarly, The Telegraph's Chris Harvey said, "This was the triumphant return of the most charismatic, most fun character on British television."

The Mirror gave the episode a perfect five star review, with the author Josh Wilding's headline being, "Stunning explanation in The Empty Hearse for how Sherlock faked his death won't satisfy everybody, but it works." whilst the author Anne-Marie Senior noted how viewers were left confused by the discontinuity showing different trains on the wrong tube lines, "Sherlock sparks Twitter fury as eagle-eyed viewers notice the lines on London Underground are WRONG."

Metro also awarded the episode four out of five stars, with reviewer Tim Liew stating, "The Empty Hearse is a fast-paced yarn filled with breathtaking audacity and laugh-out-loud moments." The episode also received very positive reviews from American critics, with The Hollywood Reporter's Tim Goodman saying "The acclaimed detective, played by Benedict Cumberbatch, returns for season three as superb (and unscathed) as when he left." Oliver Jia of The Punk Effect stated that the episode was "well worth the [two-year-long hiatus]" and praised it as a "well-acted, well-produced, well-written, and extremely engrossing drama."

David Mather, who ran fan site Sherlockology, told BBC Radio 5 Live's Victoria Derbyshire that he had been inundated with mixed responses from fans.
