= The Brazilian Cat =

- Short story by Arthur Conan Doyle
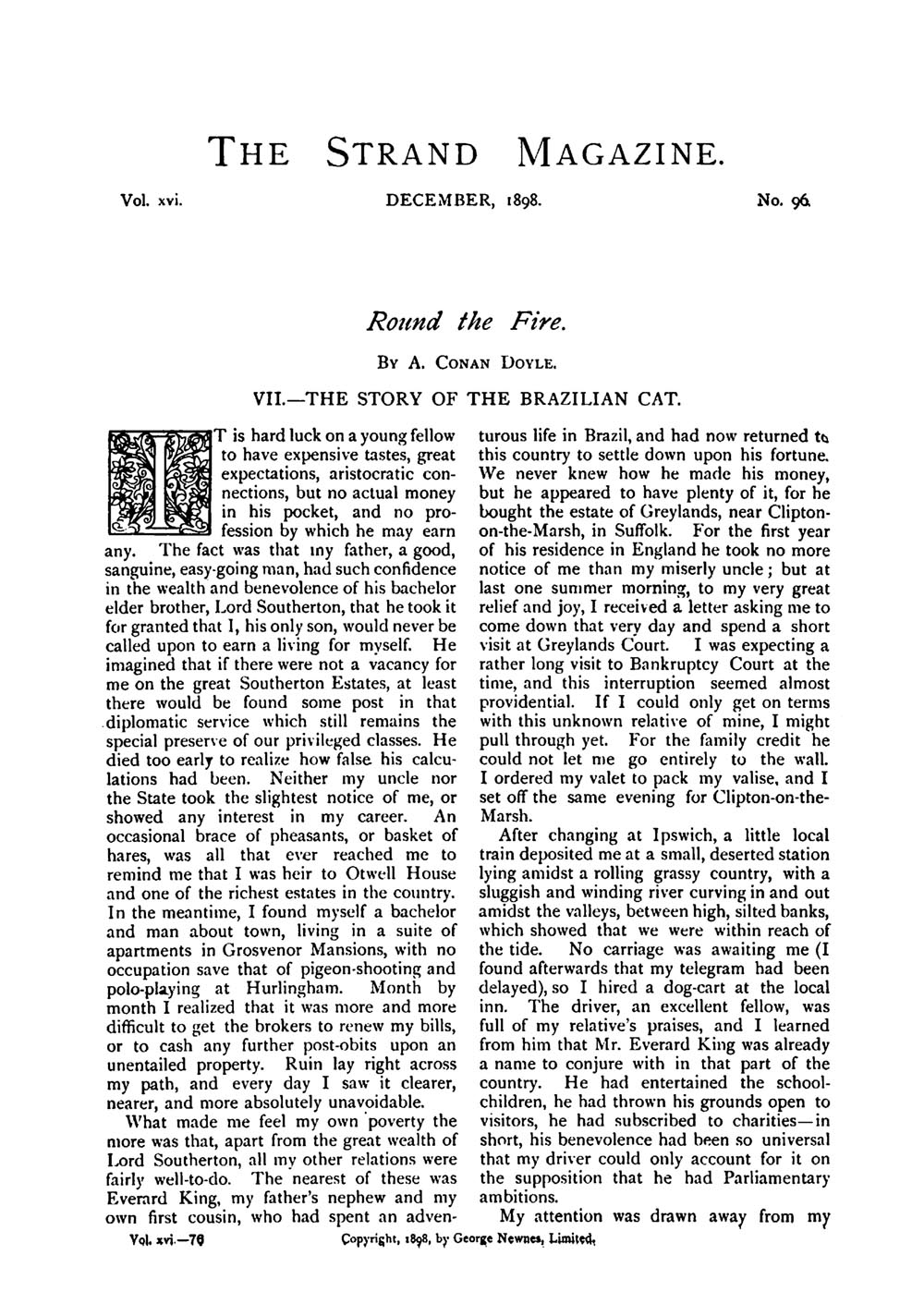

Text available at Wikisource
- Original title: The Story of the Brazilian Cat
- Country: United Kingdom
- Language: English
- Genre: Short story

Publication
- Published in: The Strand Magazine
- Publisher: George Newnes Ltd
- Media type: Print, magazine
- Publication date: December 1898
- Series: Round the Fire

"The Brazilian Cat", also titled "The Story of the Brazilian Cat", is a short story by the British writer Arthur Conan Doyle, first published in The Strand Magazine in December 1898.

== Plot summary ==
Marshall King possesses "expensive tastes, great expectations, aristocratic connections, but no actual money in his pocket, and no profession by which he may earn any". His uncle, Lord Southerton, owns one of England's richest estates but offers no support to his nephew. Facing financial ruin, Marshall is overjoyed to receive a letter from his wealthy cousin Everard King inviting him to Greylands, Everard's estate in Suffolk. Accepting the invitation, the narrator resolves to befriend Everard then ask him for financial support.

Arriving at Greylands, Marshall sees various animals that Everard has brought back to England from Brazil, including an armadillo, oriole, and peccary. He receives a warm welcome from Everard, but a cold reception from Everard's wife, who angers Everard by encouraging Marshall to return to London. Everard explains that his wife is jealous and does not like for Everard to have other companionship.

Everard gives Marshall a tour of his menagerie, which culminates at a wing of the house that has been fitted with a heavy door. Everard explains that the room houses "Tommy", a large "Brazilian cat" from the headwater of the Rio Negro that Everard has raised from a kitten. Everard demonstrates that by turning an iron handle outside the room, he can move bars underneath a wire mesh grating to cage Tommy on one side of the room. Everard remarks that Tommy "has never tasted living blood yet, but when he does he will be a terror".

During his stay, Marshall notes that Everard receives a large number of telegrams. On the final day of his visit, he discusses his financial challenges with Everard, explaining that while he is Lord Southerton's heir, he does not receive any allowance. Everard undertakes to help Marshall. Late that night, Marshall gives Everard a detailed explanation of his debts and creditors; Everard appears disinterested, but asks Marshall to write down the information.

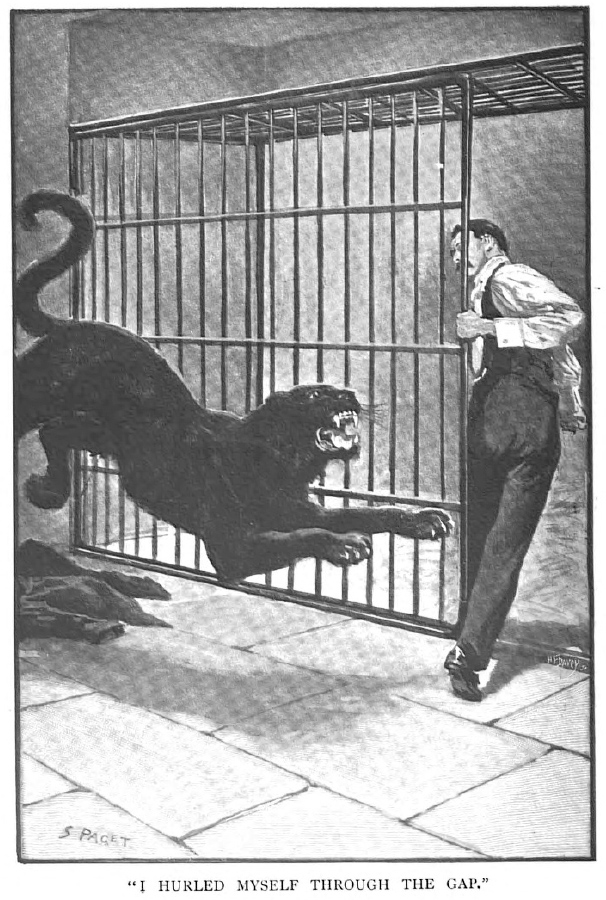
"I hurled myself through the gap". Illustration from The Strand Magazine by Sidney Paget.

Before going to bed, Everard invites Marshall to join him in visiting Tommy, who is agitated by a storm. After Everard asks Marshall to hold his lantern, he suddenly locks Marshall in the room, then begins to withdraw the bars separating Tommy from Marshall. After unsuccessfully attempting to hold the bars in place, Marshall climbs on top of the grating that forms the cage's ceiling. Waiting for daylight, Marshall reflects that "beneath [Everard's] cheerful face there lurked the spirit of a mediaeval assassin".

Upon daybreak, Tommy appears more agitated. Marshall decides to try and move the bars back into position, leaving him safe in the cage. Throwing his coat over Tommy's head, he succeeds in closing the bars with him safe inside the cage, but receives a swipe from Tommy in the process that badly injures his leg. Semi-conscious and unable to move, Marshall hears Everard enter the room to confirm if Marshall is dead. Tommy – excited by the taste of Marshall's blood – attacks and kills Everard.

Marshall is rescued by Everard's servants, who shoot Tommy. While rehabilitating, he is visited by Everard's wife, who tells him that she was too afraid to betray her husband, but that she did all she could to drive Marshall away. Later, he is visited by his lawyer, Summers, who tells him that his uncle has died and he is the new Lord Southerton. Summers notes that the old Lord Southerton died on the very day that Marshall was attacked, that Everard was the next in line, and that Lord Southerton's valet had taken money from Everard to telegram him with updates on Lord Southerton's health.

== Publication ==
"The Brazilian Cat" was first published in volume xvi, number 96 of The Strand Magazine in December 1898. It was collected in Doyle's books Round the Fire Stories (1908) and Tales of Terror and Mystery (1922), as well as several later collections. It has since been anthologised many times.

== Reception and interpretation ==
Rafe McGregor describes "The Brazilian Cat" as an example of "weird fiction" and as a "supernatural thriller", drawing comparisons to Doyle's 1901 novel The Hound of the Baskervilles. Jeffrey Meyers and Valerie Meyers offer "The Brazilian Cat" as an example of how "Doyle's stories are economical in style and structure", describing it as "darkly comic" and "a grisly satire on the hazards of visiting country houses and maniacal hosts". Writing for The Guardian in 2014, Lynne Truss described it as "a quite scary story about a Brazilian cat, in which we find the excellent description: 'One stroke of that huge paw tore off my calf as a shaving of wood curls off before a plane.'"

== Adaptations ==
On 22 October 1981, a reading of "The Brazilian Cat" by John Levitt aired on BBC Radio 4 FM as part of its A Book at Bedtime programme.
