= Ron & Don Show =

- Genre: Variety Talk Show
- Running time: 4 hours
- Country of origin: United States
- Language: English
- Home station: FM 97.3 KIRO: Puget Sound region, Washington
- Hosted by: Ron Upshaw; Don O'Neill
- Created by: Ron Upshaw; Don O'Neill
- Executive producers: Tina Nole; Jen Andrews; Carolyn Branson; Katie Sprenger; Janel Koval; Jason Stein; Libby Denkmann
- Recording studio: 97.3 KIRO-FM Headquarters Seattle, Washington; 47°38′8″N 122°19′29″W
- Original release: May 2006 – January 2019
- Audio format: Monaural Sound (Mono)
- Website: www.mynorthwest.com

The Ron and Don Show was a talk radio show in Seattle, Washington. It aired on 97.3 KIRO FM from 3:00-7:00 pm (Pacific Time) weekdays. The show was hosted by Ron Upshaw and Don O'Neill. The show's cancellation was announced on January 11, 2019.

== Hosts ==
=== Ron Upshaw ===
Ron Upshaw was born in Mount Vernon, Washington, and raised in Albuquerque, New Mexico. He currently lives in Seattle. He enjoys beekeeping and has produced several instructional DVDs for beginning beekeepers.

=== Don O'Neill ===
Don O'Neill was born outside Chicago and raised in New Mexico where he attended high school with Ron Upshaw. He lives in Seattle.

== Program ==
=== History ===
The show began as a weekend sports radio program on KJR-AM in 1995 before moving to San Francisco in 1997 where Upshaw and O'Neill hosted morning drive on KCTC. While on the Flagship Station for the Oakland Raiders, Ron & Don hosted the Joe Bugel Show, The Tim Brown Show, and The Jon Gruden Show.

The show subsequently moved to Phoenix station KZZP-FM and then Dallas' KYNG-FM In Dallas, Don O'Neill hosted the CBS Network shows on the Dallas Cowboy Radio Network with Drew Pearson and Charlie Waters for the 2001-2002 NFL season. Ron Upshaw hosted the pre and post-game shows at the first Dallas Cowboys home game after the 9/11 World Trade Center attacks.

The Ron & Don Show returned to Seattle in 2002 where they broadcast the morning show on former Hot Talk station KQBZ-FM. After a stop at WKLQ in Grand Rapids, Michigan, the Ron & Don Show settled briefly at KKND-FM in New Orleans until Hurricane Katrina destroyed the KKND transmitter. An opportunity to fill-in for KIRO-AM host Dave Ross led to a permanent assignment from 9:00pm to 1:00am in Seattle. In May 2006 their time slot was changed to afternoon drive from 3:00pm to 6:00pm.

The program was live on-air at the time of the Seattle Jewish Federation shooting in 2006; KIRO-AM won a 2007 Edward R. Murrow Award for Spot News for its coverage of this incident. The show also received attention for fundraising efforts in response to Hurricane Katrina, in conjunction with the Seattle Seahawks and the Preservation Resource Center, including a live show from the front porch of a rebuilt New Orleans home.

In 2008, following the cancellation of KIRO's short-lived long-form newscast - "The Big Story with Tony Miner" - the Ron & Don Show was extended by an hour to its current time slot of 3:00pm to 7:00pm. As of winter 2008 the program was designated as the top rated radio show in its time slot in the Seattle-Tacoma market but in summer 2009, Arbitron's introduction of PPM's (Personal People Meters) dropped the now FM-only KIRO along with "Ron and Don" to approximately 15th in the market.

The show was cancelled abruptly by KIRO and Bonneville on January 10, 2019, which came as a surprise to both listeners and station employees.

On May 17, 2019, the return of Ron and Don was announced on various Social media platforms. "As the radio tower dies… we now rise." Ron & Don Radio returned on Radio.com on May 27, 2019.

=== Guests ===
Since returning to Seattle, show guests included Sig Hansen and Keith Colburn of television program "Deadliest Catch". Famous guests have included Jimmy Carter, Arianna Huffington, Colin Hanks and Bill Maher.

=== Topics ===
The program was a variety talk show, dealing with a mixture of sports, entertainment and news topics.

== Awards ==
- The Ron & Don Show was voted Best Local Radio Show by the readers of Seattle Weekly in 2008.
- Presented with the Citizen's Award by the Seattle Police Guild. "The Seattle Police Guild honored the Ron and Don Nation with a citizens award Wednesday for the money raised with Armed Around Our Officers and for the phone tips that helped capture Christopher Monfort."
