= How Watson Learned the Trick =

Sherlock Holmes story

"How Watson Learned the Trick" is a Sherlock Holmes parody written by Arthur Conan Doyle in 1924. It concerns Doctor Watson attempting to demonstrate to Holmes how he has learned the latter's "superficial trick" of logical deduction by giving a summary of Holmes' current state of mind and plans for the day ahead, only for Holmes to then reveal that every single one of Watson's deductions is incorrect.

Conan Doyle was one of several authors commissioned to provide books for the library of Queen Mary's Dolls' House; others included J. M. Barrie, Thomas Hardy, Rudyard Kipling and W. Somerset Maugham. Conan Doyle was provided with a book approximately 1.5 in × 1.25 in (3.8 cm × 3.2 cm) into which he wrote the 503-word story of How Watson Learned the Trick by hand, taking up 34 pages. The original manuscript is still part of the Dolls' House library.

== Publication ==
The story was published in the souvenir book, The Book of the Queen's Dolls' House Library (1924), and in The New York Times on 24 August 1924. It appears in the Penguin collection The Uncollected Sherlock Holmes (ISBN 0-14-006432-X).

A new version, a replica based on the miniature book created for Queen Mary's Doll's House by Conan Doyle, was published in October 2014 by Walker Books in collaboration with Royal Collections Trust (ISBN 978-1-4063-4597-1).

== Adaptations ==
A scene very much in the manner of "How Watson Learned the Trick" is featured in the 1985 television adaptation of "The Adventure of the Resident Patient" in the Sherlock Holmes television series starring Jeremy Brett, with Watson attempting to apply Holmes's methods to uncover his friend's current state but largely failing, although Holmes does admit that "there is an element of truth in what you say".

The story was incorporated into an episode of the Imagination Theatre radio series The Further Adventures of Sherlock Holmes. The episode, also titled "How Watson Learned the Trick", aired on 20 April 2008.

"How Vido Learned the Trick" by fantasy author Josh Reynolds, featuring sage-detective Zavant Konniger and his halfling manservant Vido, was published in the 2018 Warhammer Fantasy anthology Inferno! Volume 1.
