= KIRO-FM =

- Tacoma, Washington; United States
- Broadcast area: Seattle-Tacoma; Puget Sound region
- Frequency: 97.3 MHz (HD Radio)
- Branding: KIRO Newsradio 97.3 FM ("KIRO" pronounced as "Cairo")

Programming
- Format: News/talk
- Subchannels: HD2: Sports (KIRO simulcast); HD3: Conservative talk (KTTH simulcast)
- Network: ABC News Radio
- Affiliations: Compass Media Networks; Premiere Networks; KIRO-TV (news and weather sharing); Seattle Seahawks Radio Network

Ownership
- Owner: Bonneville International; (Bonneville International Corporation)
- Sister stations: KIRO (AM), KTTH

History
- First air date: October 26, 1948
- Former call signs: KTNT-FM (1948–1976); KNBQ (1976–1988); KBSG (1988–1989); KBSG-FM (1989–2008)
- Call sign meaning: See KIRO (AM)

Technical information
- Licensing authority: FCC
- Facility ID: 33682
- Class: C
- ERP: 55,000 watts
- HAAT: 729 meters (2,392 ft)
- Transmitter coordinates: 47°30′14″N 121°58′29″W

Links
- Public license information: Public file; LMS
- Webcast: Listen live
- Website: mynorthwest.com/category/kiro-radio/

KIRO-FM (97.3 MHz) is a commercial radio station licensed to Tacoma, Washington, and serving the Seattle-Tacoma radio market. It airs a news/talk radio format and is owned by Salt Lake City–based Bonneville International, a broadcasting company owned by the Church of Jesus Christ of Latter-day Saints. The studios and offices are located on Eastlake Avenue East in Seattle's Eastlake district.

KIRO-FM starts weekdays with Seattle's Morning News, hosted by Charlie Harger and Manda Factor. The rest of the weekday schedule is made up of local talk hosts. At night, nationally syndicated shows are heard: Coast to Coast AM with George Noory and This Morning, America's First News with Gordon Deal. Weekends feature shows on money, health, food, travel, home repair and veterans, some of which are paid brokered programming. Nights and weekends, an update from ABC News Radio] begins most hours.

KIRO-FM's transmitter is on Tiger Mountain in Issaquah. Its effective radiated power (ERP) is 55,000 watts. KIRO-FM broadcasts in the HD (digital) radio format. The HD-2 digital subchannel simulcasts co-owned KIRO (710 AM)'s sports radio format. The HD-3 signal airs KTTH (770 AM)'s conservative talk format.

== History ==
=== KTNT-FM (1948–1976) ===
The station was founded as KTNT-FM and was owned by The Tacoma News Tribune. It signed on the air on October 26, 1948. The station was powered at 10,000 watts, a fraction of its current output, and exclusively targeted Tacoma and South Puget Sound.

The Tacoma News Tribune added an AM station in 1952, KTNT (1400 kHz, now KITZ); and in 1953, KTNT-TV (channel 11, now KSTW). The call signs for the three stations were derived from the newspaper's initials.

=== KNBQ (1976–1988) ===
In 1976, the call letters were changed to KNBQ. While the AM station carried a personality adult top 40 sound, the FM station switched to an automated adult contemporary format ("Mellow sounds in contemporary music") branded as "97 KNBQ". In early 1977, that format evolved to an automated music-intensive Top 40 format as "Q-97 FM". That automated Top 40 format shifted over time from using syndicated programming tapes (such as from Drake-Chenault's XT-40 format) to a locally programmed approach, and eventually added live DJs. By 1980, the station was live and local with a full DJ staff and a personality intensive approach. (The KNBQ call letters later were found on FM 102.9 and currently on FM 98.5.)

In the 1980s, the Tacoma News Tribune boosted KNBQ's power to 100,000 watts. The Federal Communications Commission granted a construction permit to increase the antenna height to 1,480 feet, moving the transmitter to Tiger Mountain. That greatly increased the station's value, now able to compete in the entire Seattle-Tacoma media market. In 1987, KNBQ was sold to the original iteration of Viacom. Viacom kept the Top 40 format but used a "no talking over the music" policy to differentiate KNBQ from other Seattle Top 40 outlets.

=== KBSG (1988–2008) ===
On February 1, 1988, the station flipped to an oldies format as "K-Best", and picked up the KBSG-FM call letters. "K-Best" initially concentrated on the biggest hits of the 1960s, with some 1970s songs and a few late 1950s hits. As the station moved into the 1990s, the 1970s titles were increased and the 1950s songs were removed.

Entercom bought the station in 1996. For many years, KBSG-FM was simulcast on co-owned KBSG in Auburn (1210 AM, now KMIA). This lasted until 2002, when KBSG flipped to all-news radio (KBSG would later be sold to Bustos Media, which specializes in Spanish language formats). On August 1, 2007, after Entercom traded KBSG, KIRO and KTTH to Bonneville as part of a multi-market station swap, KBSG was rebranded from "KBSG 97.3" to "The New B97.3", and dropped the word "oldies" from the station's title. The station's playlist was moved to more 1970s and 80s music, with fewer 60s titles. The format moved from oldies to classic hits.

Exactly one year later, on August 1, 2008, the station's call letters were switched to KIRO-FM.

=== KIRO-FM (2008–present) ===
Logo for 97.3 KIRO-FM as used from 2008 to 2012.

On August 12, 2008, at 4:23 a.m., the 97.3 frequency began to simulcast co-owned news/talk radio station AM 710 KIRO. The final song on 97.3 as a classic hits station, "Start Me Up" by the Rolling Stones, faded out as the FM station joined KIRO AM's Wall Street Journal This Morning in progress.

On April 1, 2009, KIRO-FM became the primary station as the simulcasting on KIRO (AM) came to an end. It marked the completion of the station's transition to the FM frequency that began in August 2008. KIRO (AM) is now a sports talk station, branded as "710 Seattle Sports".

Also moved from KIRO to KIRO-FM were the NFL broadcasts of the Seattle Seahawks Radio Network (later named the Bing Radio Network and the American Family Insurance Radio Network, currently the Delta Air Lines Seahawks Radio Network). KIRO-FM is now the flagship station for the team's play-by-play and the pre- and post-game shows. The Seahawks had been heard on KIRO (AM) since the NFL franchise was launched in 1976.

Logo for 97.3 KIRO-FM as used from 2012 to 2022.

== KIRO-FM programming ==
=== Sports ===
- Seattle Seahawks Football hosted by Steve Raible and Dave Wyman.
- Seahawks Pre-Game and Seahawks Post Game hosted by Steve Raible and Dave Wyman with Michael Bumpus, Jordan Babineaux, Paul Moyer, and Ray Roberts. The pregame show was hosted by controversial KIRO-FM talk show host Dori Monson until October 2020, when he was suspended indefinitely following accusations of transphobic tweets. After that, Monson was replaced by Dave Wyman, who also hosts the afternoon drive show Wyman and Bob with Bob Stelton on KIRO (AM).

=== Syndicated shows ===
- Coast to Coast AM with George Noory
- This Morning, America's First News with Gordon Deal

=== Past programs ===
- The Ron and Don Show, hosted by Ron Upshaw and Don O'Neill
- The Jason and Burns Show, hosted by Jason Rantz and Zak Burns
- KIRO Morning News, hosted by Bill Radke and Linda Thomas
- Northwest Nights, hosted by Frank Shiers
- Mike Webb Show, hosted by Mike Webb
- John Procaccino, hosted by John Procaccino
- Alan Prell, hosted by Alan Prell
- Northwest Sports, hosted by New York Vinnie
- Horses' Ass Radio, hosted by David Goldstein
- Bryan Styble Show, hosted by Bryan Styble
- My Northwest Weekend, hosted by Larry Rice, later hosted by Josh Kerns
- The John Curley Show, hosted by John Curley. Dan Mitchinson News Anchor
- The Bill Radke Treatment, hosted by Bill Radke
- The News Chick Show, hosted by Linda Thomas
- The Andrew Walsh Show, hosted by Andrew Walsh
- The Dave Ross Show, hosted by Dave Ross
- The Ross and Burbank Show, hosted by Dave Ross and Luke Burbank
- Too Beautiful to Live, hosted by Luke Burbank (continues as a podcast)
- On The Water hosted by Captain Bob McLaughlin.
- Geekwire hosted by Todd Bishop and John Cook.
- Seattle Sounds hosted by Josh Kerns.
- The mixtape hosted by Sean De Tore
- Dori Monson Show airs weekdays from 12:00pm – 3:00pm
- Seattle's Morning News, hosted by Dave Ross and Colleen O'Brien
- Prime Time with John Dickerson
- CBS Eye on the World with John Batchelor

== Locations ==
Towers: 47°30′14″N 121°58′29″W, on Tiger Mountain
Headquarters: 47°38′8″N 122°19′29″W, Seattle, Washington, on the shores of Lake Union
