= The Story of the Lost Special =

- Short story by Arthur Conan Doyle
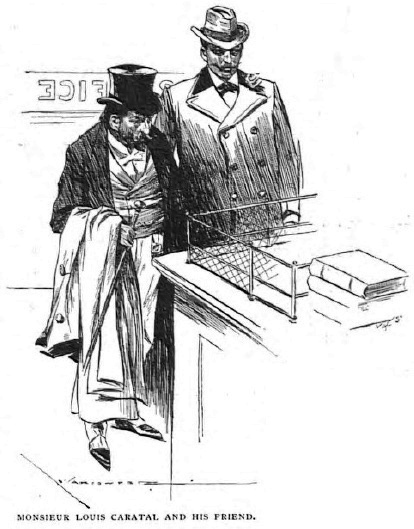
- Caratal and his bodyguard in a railway station office, illustrated by Max Cowper (The Strand Magazine, 1898)
- Country: United Kingdom
- Language: English

Publication
- Publication date: 1898

"The Story of the Lost Special", sometimes abbreviated to "The Lost Special", is a mystery short story by Arthur Conan Doyle first published in The Strand Magazine in August 1898. A minor character in the story is possibly implied to be Doyle's character Sherlock Holmes, though his name is not used and this character does not provide the mystery's solution. The story's narrative mode is third person, subjective, though the narrator is not identified.

== Synopsis ==
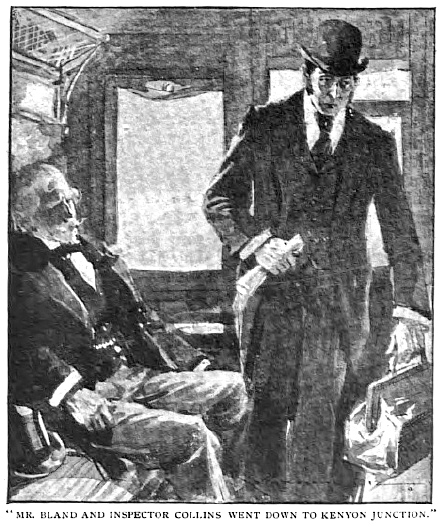
A station official and an inspector going to Kenyon Junction to investigate, illustrated by Max Cowper (The Strand, 1898)

This story concerns the baffling disappearance of a privately hired train (a special) from the London and North Western Railway Company on its journey from Liverpool to London on 3 June 1890; besides the engine driver, fireman, and guard, the only passengers are two South Americans. The train is confirmed to have passed Kenyon Junction but did not pass Barton Moss. The only clues are the dead body of the driver found along the line past Kenyon Junction and a letter from the United States that purports to come from the train guard. Authorities fail to discover any traces of the train. A letter to The Times by "an amateur reasoner of some celebrity at that date" is excerpted at one point:

"It is one of the elementary principles of practical reasoning, that when the impossible has been eliminated the residuum, HOWEVER IMPROBABLE, must contain the truth. It is certain that the train left Kenyon Junction. It is certain that it did not reach Barton Moss. It is in the highest degree unlikely, but still possible, that it may have taken one of the seven available side lines. It is obviously impossible for a train to run where there are no rails, and, therefore, we may reduce our improbables to the three open lines, namely the Carnstock Iron Works, the Big Ben, and the Perseverance. Is there a secret society of colliers, an English Camorra, which is capable of destroying both train and passengers? It is improbable, but it is not impossible. I confess that I am unable to suggest any other solution. I should certainly advise the company to direct all their energies towards the observation of those three lines, and of the workmen at the end of them. A careful supervision of the pawnbrokers' shops of the district might possibly bring some suggestive facts to light."

This proposition from "a recognized authority upon such matters" meets with heated opposition, although the objectors fail to supply any conceivable alternative. Nevertheless, the responsible authorities do not act on the proposal and the public never shows any interest in the matter, as a political scandal has already attracted their attention.

Eight years later, a criminal called Herbert de Lernac, scheduled for execution in Marseille, confesses to the crime. Under his command, a conspiracy of men had temporarily re-connected the side track leading to the abandoned mine Heartsease just long enough for the train to go down to the mine, then pulled the rails back up before they could be discovered. The fireman and guard were involved but not the driver, whose death was caused after he fell from the train when the conspirators tried to overpower him. The objective of this crime was to eliminate the train's passenger, Monsieur Caratal; he carried incriminating documents and intended to present them in an 1890 trial in Paris. Doing so would have endangered several high-ranking officials, who hired Herbert to handle the matter. In his plot, Herbert used the services of an unnamed English ally, whom he describes as "one of the acutest brains in England" and as "a man with a considerable future before him" at the time of Herbert's confession in 1898. Herbert de Lernac also claims to have kept several incriminating papers which Caratal's bodyguard Eduardo Gomez threw out of a window of the train. He suppresses the names of his employers but threatens to reveal their names if he is not granted a pardon. The story does not reveal whether his blackmail succeeded in gaining him that pardon.

== Publication history ==
"The Story of the Lost Special" was first published in The Strand Magazine in August 1898, with illustrations by Max Cowper, as part of Doyle's Round the Fire series. It was the third story in the series, following "The Story of the Beetle-Hunter" (June 1898) and "The Story of the Man with the Watches" (July 1898).

Though the "amateur reasoner of some celebrity" referenced in the story is unnamed, some commentators have speculated that the character is Sherlock Holmes, and have also suggested that Holmes is referenced in "The Story of the Man with the Watches". When these two stories were published in 1898, Doyle had killed off Holmes, who had made his "final" appearance in the 1893 story "The Final Problem". Doyle also wrote a very brief Holmes parody titled "The Field Bazaar" that was published in 1896 but not widely seen. Doyle would return to writing about Holmes in 1901, with the beginning of the serialized version of The Hound of the Baskervilles.

The story was included in Doyle's 1908 short story collection Round the Fire Stories, published by Smith, Elder & Co. in the United Kingdom and by The McClure Company in the United States, under the title "The Lost Special". It was later published in other collections of stories by Doyle, including Tales of Terror and Mystery (published by John Murray in 1922) and The Black Doctor and Other Tales of Terror and Mystery (published by George H. Doran Co. in 1925).

It has been included in anthologies of stories by various authors such as Victorian Tales of Mystery and Detection (1992), edited by Michael Cox, and Miraculous Mysteries (2017), edited by Martin Edwards.

== Adaptations ==
- The story was loosely adapted into the serial The Lost Special (1932) as a western.
- An episode in the radio series The Adventures of Sherlock Holmes was titled "The Case of the Lost Special". Written by Edith Meiser, the episode aired on 18 November 1934. It incorporated elements of the short story "The Final Problem". When the copyright for the script was registered it was titled "The Lost Train".
- The story was adapted as a 1943 episode of the radio program Suspense.
- The story was adapted as an episode of the radio program Escape which aired February 12, 1949. While the episode includes several letters to the Times, the one sometimes attributed to Sherlock Holmes is not among them.
- The Sherlock Holmes pastiche series Solar Pons by August Derleth treated the story as canon with its own version of the story, "The Adventure of the Lost Locomotive" (1951).
- A faithful adaptation was done in 1980 for Radio Mystery Theatre as "The Mysterious Rochdale Special".
- An episode of the Imagination Theatre radio series The Further Adventures of Sherlock Holmes was based on the story. The episode, titled "The Adventure of the Parisian Assassin", aired in 2011.
- The 2014 Sherlock episode "The Empty Hearse" features a car on the London Underground vanishing between two stations.
- A similar scenario appears in the 2014 video game Sherlock Holmes: Crimes & Punishments. The correct solution is changed from the one in the story, but all the relevant elements remain.

== See also ==
- The Great Train Robbery, a 1941 film containing essentially the same method for causing the disappearance of a train between stations
- Night Probe!, a 1981 novel containing a similar scenario of a missing hijacked train
