= KTTH =

- Seattle, Washington; United States
- Broadcast area: Seattle metropolitan area
- Frequency: 770 kHz
- Branding: Seattle Red 770

Programming
- Format: Conservative talk
- Network: Fox News Radio
- Affiliations: Radio America; Salem Radio Network; Westwood One

Ownership
- Owner: Bonneville International; (Bonneville International Corporation)
- Sister stations: KIRO; KIRO-FM

History
- First air date: April 5, 1925; 101 years ago
- Former call signs: KTCL (1925–1926); KOMO (1926); KGFA (1926–1927); KTCL (1927); KXA (1927–1986); KRPM (1986–1991, 1995); KULL (1991–1995); KNWX (1995–2003)
- Call sign meaning: "The Truth"

Technical information
- Licensing authority: FCC
- Facility ID: 27023
- Class: B
- Power: 50,000 watts (day); 5,000 watts (night)
- Transmitter coordinates: 47°23′38″N 122°25′25″W
- Translators: 94.5 K233BU (Seattle); 94.5 K233DT (Eastlake)
- Repeater: (97.3-3) KIRO-HD3 (Tacoma)

Links
- Public license information: Public file; LMS
- Webcast: Listen live
- Website: seattlered.com

KTTH (770 AM) is a commercial radio station in Seattle, Washington. It is owned by Salt Lake City–based Bonneville International, a broadcasting company owned by of The Church of Jesus Christ of Latter-day Saints. It airs a conservative talk radio format. The station's transmitter site is on Vashon Island, while its studios are located in Seattle's Eastlake district.

KTTH broadcasts with 50,000 watts during the day and 5,000 watts at night. Programming is also heard on FM translator K233BU at 94.5 MHz.

== Programming ==
Bonneville owns two talk radio stations in Seattle. KIRO-FM concentrates largely on local shows and news while KTTH airs mostly syndicated programming. On weekdays afternoons, local talk host Jason Rantz is heard. The rest of the schedule includes Armstrong & Getty, The Dana Loesch Show, The Guy Benson Show, The Will Cain Show, Fox Across America with Jimmy Failla, America at Night with Rich Valdes and America's First News with Matt Ray.

On weekends, KTTH features shows on health, money, retirement and real estate, some of which are brokered programming. Weekend syndicated hosts include Brian Kilmeade, Brett Baier and Josh Hammer. Most hours begin with an update from Fox News Radio.

== History ==
The station was first licensed as KTCL, to the American Radio Telephone Company of Seattle. The call letters stood for the slogan "Know The Charmed Land". Much of its facilities were obtained through the purchase of equipment previously used by Roy Olmsted's station, KFQX. KTCL made its debut broadcast on April 5, 1925.

In mid-1926 the call letters were changed from KTCL to KOMO, with the owner now listed as American Radio Telephone Co. (Birt F. Fisher). Late that year the KOMO call letters were transferred to another Seattle station, with the now former KOMO changing to KGFA. This was quickly changed back to the original call sign of KTCL. In the fall of 1927 the call letters became KXA.

In 1932, KXA was authorized to move to 760 kHz. In 1941, as part of the implementation of the North American Regional Broadcasting Agreement, KXA was shifted to 770 kHz. Because of the requirement to protect the nighttime signal of WJZ (later WABC) in New York City, the primary station on these frequencies, during its early history KXA was a daytimer station, and generally required to go off the air at sunset.

=== Classical music ===
During the 1960s and 1970s, KXA had a classical music format. It competed with KING-FM 98.1 and KUOW-FM 94.9, which both aired classical music on the FM dial.

=== Oldies and country ===
As FM became more popular for listening to classical music, on October 1, 1980, the station changed to an oldies format and was known as "Old Gold 77 KXA".

Following a bankruptcy filing, the station switched from oldies to brokered Christian radio programming in 1983. The station's license was transferred to new owners that same year, and on October 8, 1984, a format called "love songs" began, which was essentially a return to oldies.

In 1986, following a sale to Highsmith Broadcasting, the station flipped to a simulcast of country music station KRPM-FM (now KBKS-FM) and changed its call letters to KRPM. In 1991, the station changed call letters to KULL, returning to oldies. Country music returned in January 1995, as did the simulcast with KRPM.

=== Talk programming ===
In November 1995, a format swap was made with AM 1090, with 770 receiving the call letters KNWX and an all-news radio format, using programming from CNN Headline News. That was followed by a switch to business talk programming in 1998.

The station's call letters were changed to KTTH in 2003, along with a flip to conservative talk. KNWX moved to 1210 AM that same year and continued until 2004, when it was renamed KWMG (now KMIA). In August 2025, the station changed its on-air branding to Seattle Red to accompany the launch of a new website under the same name, and efforts to include additional coverage of Idaho and Oregon.

Previous logo

=== Sports ===
KTTH was the last flagship radio station of the Seattle SuperSonics from 2006 to 2008, until their move to Oklahoma City. The station serves as a backup station to KIRO for Seattle Mariners and Washington State Cougars play-by-play when the Seahawks are playing at the same time.
