= John V. Pavlik =

American academic and author

John Vernon Pavlik is an American academic and author who publishes on the impact of technology on journalism, media, and society.

== Biography ==
He is a distinguished professor in the Department of Journalism and Media Studies in the School of Communication and Information at Rutgers, the state university of New Jersey. He is former chair of the Department of Journalism and Media Studies at the School of Communication, Information and Library Studies at Rutgers University. While on leave from Rutgers in 2013 he served as the associate dean for research at Northwestern University in Qatar. He is also former chair of the editorial board for the journal of the National Academy of Television Arts and Sciences' Television Quarterly and a faculty associate at the Columbia Institute for Tele-Information.

Pavlik was a professor and executive director of the Center for New Media at the Columbia University Graduate School of Journalism. He also previously served as the founding director of the School of Communication at San Diego State University.

Pavlik writes about the impact of new technology on journalism, media and society. His most recent book is Converging Media, co-written with Shawn McIntosh (Oxford University Press 2013). Other works include Journalism and New Media (ISBN 0231114834, Columbia University Press, 2001) and New Media Technology: Cultural and Commercial Perspectives (ISBN 020527093X), now in its 2nd edition (Allyn & Bacon, 1998).

Pavlik has written more than a dozen computer software packages for education in journalism and communication. He holds a Ph.D. and M.A. in mass communication from the University of Minnesota and is a graduate of the School of Journalism and Mass Communication at the University of Wisconsin–Madison. He is co-developer with Prof. Steven Feiner of the Situated Documentary, a new form of storytelling using augmented reality.

He is married with two children and lives in New York City.

He developed the idea of the Three Stages of Online News Content, a concept which explains the source of online news content. That model contains three stages:

1. Posting repurposed content taken directly from printed or over-air media. This is currently the most dominating format used.
2. Posting repurposed information augmented with original content.
3. Enhancing the cyberspace community while establishing a willingness to experiment with new forms of storytelling.
