= The Case of Lady Sannox =

Short story by Arthur Conan Doyle

- Short story by Sir Arthur Conan Doyle
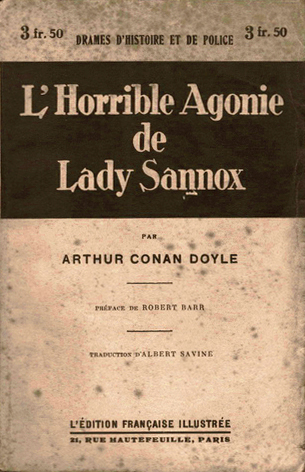

Text available at Wikisource
- Country: United Kingdom
- Language: English
- Genre: Short story

Publication
- Published in: The Idler
- Media type: Print (magazine)
- Publication date: November 1893

"The Case of Lady Sannox" (also published as "The Kiss of Blood") is a short story by the British author Sir Arthur Conan Doyle, first published in The Idler in November 1893.

== Plot summary ==
The story features an arrogant surgeon, Douglas Stone, who is in love with the married Lady Sannox, one of the most beautiful women in London. On his way to a rendezvous with her, the surgeon is asked by a Turkish man to operate on the latter's wife, who has cut her lip with a poisoned scimitar. The doctor is informed the woman will die if the poison is not cut out.

Because of his desire to meet his lover, his need for money, his professional arrogance, and the opinion of the Turk that any delay would kill his wife, the surgeon goes ahead with the operation on the heavily drugged wife, whose face is obscured by a veil. After he has performed the operation, Dr. Stone realizes his patient is Lady Sannox, and the Turk her husband, who believes the disfigurement will be morally good for his wife. The surgeon suffers a breakdown.

== Adaptations ==
"The Case of Lady Sannox" was adapted for television in 1949 as an episode of the American television anthology series Suspense. The episode is one of the surviving episodes of the series. The cast included Stella Adler as Lady Sannox, Henry Brandon as Dr. Douglas Stone, and Berry Kroeger as Lord Sannox.

The story was incorporated into an episode of the Sherlock Holmes radio series The Further Adventures of Sherlock Holmes, on the radio program Imagination Theatre. The episode, titled "The Lady Sannox Investigation", was first broadcast on 28 September 2008. In the episode, which is set after the events of the original short story, Holmes investigates the cause of Dr. Stone's mental breakdown. Lord Sannox was played by Stephan Weyte.
