= Jim French (radio host) =

American radio presenter and producer (1928–2017)

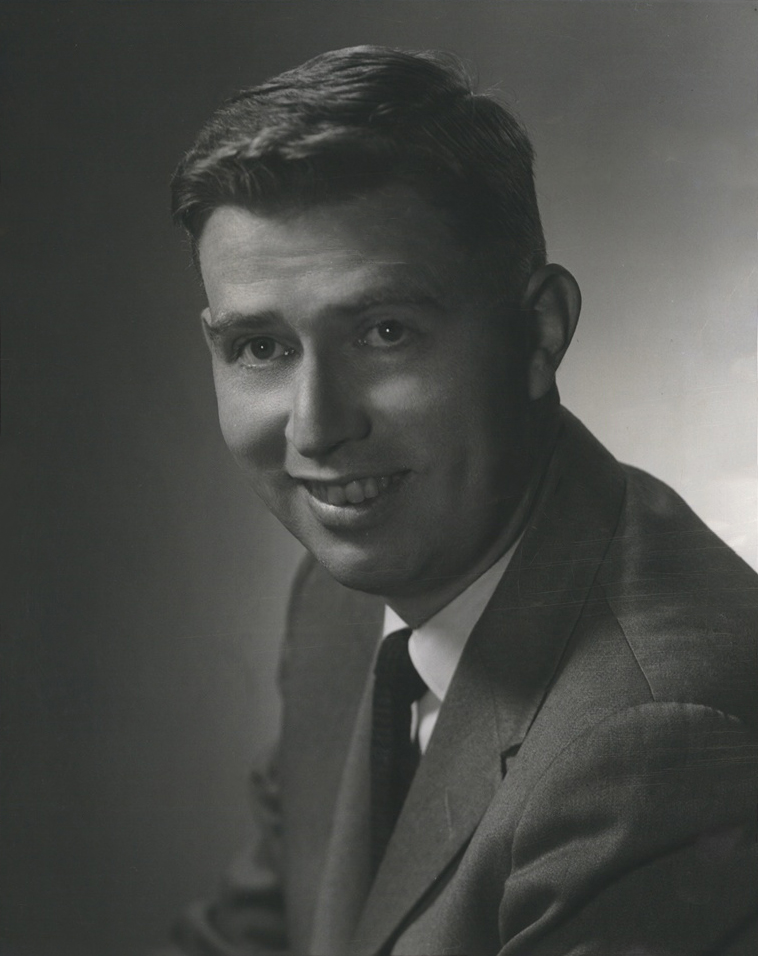
- French in 1959
- Born: September 23, 1928; Pasadena, California
- Died: December 20, 2017 (aged 89); Seattle, Washington
- Education: Pasadena City College
- Occupations: Radio personality, voice actor
- Years active: 1944–2017
- Spouse: Patricia Anne Soule (m. 1950; died 2017)
- Children: 2

James Rowley French (September 23, 1928 – December 20, 2017) was an American radio host, voice actor, writer and producer. French founded Imagination Theatre in 1996 and served as its producer until 2017. He was the morning DJ on the Seattle radio station KIRO from 1959 to 1971, and again from 1980 to 1994.

As a voice actor, French was known for his work in video games by Valve, including Half-Life 2 (2004), Left 4 Dead (2008), and Dota 2 (2013).

== Early life ==
James Rowley French was born on September 23, 1928, in Pasadena, California, to Mabelle (née Rowley) and James Forrest French. French got his first job in radio as a teenager, on the Pasadena AM station KXLA. French enlisted in the U.S. Army in 1945 and was stationed in allied-occupied Japan, where he worked for the Armed Forces Radio. He attended the Pasadena City College following his discharge.

== Career ==
=== Radio ===
Following stints working in radio in Southern California and Honolulu, French became morning DJ on the Seattle radio station KIRO in 1959. He left KIRO in 1971 and moved to KVI, where he produced and wrote radio dramas. French was dismissed from his position at KVI in 1978, and he returned to KIRO in as a host 1980. He stepped down from his position as a host in 1994.

In 1996, French began production of the radio drama program Imagination Theatre, which in 2003 moved to KIXI. His syndicated programs are now broadcast on over 120 stations in the U.S. and Canada and are also broadcast via XM Satellite Radio throughout North America.

In January 2017, it was announced that, due to age and health issues, French and his family would be closing down their production company, Jim French Productions, and discontinuing all broadcasts of Imagination Theatre at the end of March 2017. Imagination Theatre was relaunched in 2019, following a successful crowdfunding campaign headed by actors and producers John Patrick Lowrie and Larry Albert, and is now produced by Aural Vision, LLC.

=== Voice acting ===
As an actor, French appeared on the 1996 NBC miniseries Pandora's Clock as a non-commissioned officer. He was best known for voice acting work in video games by Valve Corporation, most notably Father Grigori in Half-Life 2, Bill in Left 4 Dead and Left 4 Dead 2 and the Elder Titan in Dota 2. He additionally voiced the Scientist in Gunman Chronicles and the Fisherman in the tech demo Half-Life 2: Lost Coast.

== Personal life and death ==
French met Patricia Anne "Pat" Soule while attending Pasadena City College, and the two married in June 1950. They were married for 66 years, until her death in February 2017, and had two children. Pat worked as an acting teacher at Bellevue College and later worked with her husband on Imagination Theatre.

French died in Seattle on December 20, 2017, at age 89.

== Filmography ==
=== Video games ===
Year	Title	Role	Notes
2000	Gunman Chronicles	The Scientist	
2004	Half-Life 2	Father Grigori	
2005	Half-Life 2: Lost Coast	The Fisherman	
2008	Left 4 Dead	William "Bill" Overbeck	
2009	Left 4 Dead 2	William "Bill" Overbeck	
2011	Payday: The Heist	William "Bill" Overbeck	
2013	Dota 2	Elder Titan	

== See also ==
- Imagination Theatre
