= KIRO (AM) =

- Seattle, Washington; United States
- Broadcast area: Seattle-Tacoma; Puget Sound region
- Frequency: 710 kHz
- Branding: Seattle Sports

Programming
- Format: Sports radio
- Affiliations: ESPN Radio; Seattle Mariners Radio Network; Seattle Seahawks; Washington State Cougars football; Washington State Cougars men's basketball

Ownership
- Owner: Bonneville International; (Bonneville International Corporation)
- Sister stations: KIRO-FM; KTTH

History
- First air date: April 27, 1927
- Former call signs: KPCB (1927–1935)
- Former frequencies: 650 kHz (1927–1937)
- Call sign meaning: Sounds like Cairo

Technical information
- Licensing authority: FCC
- Facility ID: 6362
- Class: A
- Power: 50,000 watts
- Transmitter coordinates: 47°23′55″N 122°26′0″W
- Repeater: 97.3 KIRO-FM HD2 (Tacoma)

Links
- Public license information: Public file; LMS
- Webcast: Listen live
- Website: sports.mynorthwest.com

KIRO (710 kHz "Seattle Sports") is a commercial radio station licensed to serve Seattle, Washington, owned by Salt Lake City–based Bonneville International. The station airs a sports radio format and is an ESPN Radio Network affiliate, its studios and offices are located on Eastlake Avenue in Seattle's Eastlake district.

KIRO is a class A clear channel station, it broadcasts at the maximum power for U.S. AM radio stations, 50,000 watts. By day, it uses a non-directional antenna. At night, KIRO must use a directional antenna to protect the other class A station on 710 AM, WOR in New York City, and the previously allocated class B station on 710, KSPN in Los Angeles, from interference. The station's transmitter is off Dockton Road SW on Vashon Island. KIRO is Washington State's primary entry point station in the Emergency Alert System.

== History ==
=== 650 KPCB (1927 to 1937) ===
The station began broadcasting on April 27, 1927, as KPCB on 650 kilocycles. Its founder was Moritz Thomsen of the Pacific Coast Biscuit Company (hence the call sign KPCB) and it was powered at 100 watts. Among its announcers was Chet Huntley, later of television's Huntley-Brinkley Report. In 1935, Saul Haas's Queen City Broadcasting Company took over the station. Queen City increased the power to 500 watts. Haas, who was well connected in liberal politics and the business community, wanted a simple, pronounceable, and recognizable call sign for his new station. He chose KIRO, which is usually pronounced like the capital of Egypt, "Cairo", not like the Illinois city.

=== 710 KIRO (1937 to 1960) ===
In 1937, KIRO was assigned the AM 710 frequency and was granted an increase in power to 1,000 watts. Soon after, KIRO acquired the Seattle CBS Radio Network affiliation rights from KOL. Known as "The Friendly Station," KIRO personalities broke from the formal announcing style that was commonplace during the early days of radio. KIRO carried CBS's dramas, comedies, news, sports, soap operas, game shows and big band broadcasts during the "Golden Age of Radio".

On June 29, 1941, a new, 50,000-watt transmitter on Maury Island became operational. From the 1930s through the 1950s, KIRO recorded countless hours of CBS programming for time-delayed rebroadcast to its Pacific Time Zone listeners. These electrical transcriptions are, in many cases, the only recordings made of World War II-era news coverage over the CBS Network. The discs were donated to the University of Washington in the early 1960s and are now held at the National Archives as the Milo Ryan Phonoarchive Collection.

In 1948, the original KIRO-FM went on the air at 100.7 MHz. It initially simulcast its AM sister's programming but in the 1960s it became a beautiful music outlet. In 1975, it changed its call letters to KSEA and today is KKWF. Preparing for a future television allocation, KIRO moved in 1952 from downtown studios to a larger building on Queen Anne Hill. This peak was already home to the KING-TV transmitter and would soon be the site for KOMO-TV as well. Queen City Broadcasting was awarded Seattle's last remaining VHF TV license in 1958, and signed on as CBS affiliate KIRO-TV on February 8. Aside from a short two-and-a-half-year period from 1995 to 1997 when it served as a UPN station, KIRO-TV has served as Seattle's CBS television affiliate since.

=== 1960 to 1980 ===
Haas sold KIRO to The Deseret News Publishing Company, part of the Church of Jesus Christ of Latter-day Saints, in 1963. He earned a handsome return on his investment 28 years earlier. When the LDS Church reorganized its broadcasting properties as Bonneville International Corporation, Haas joined Bonneville's board. Bonneville executives Lloyd Cooney and Ken Hatch arrived in Seattle to lead KIRO-AM-FM-TV, in 1964. Like many network radio affiliates following the demise of full-time block programming, KIRO spent the 1960s playing middle of the road music in addition to long-form news and interview shows.

Morning host Jim French spent several years broadcasting from the rotating restaurant atop the Space Needle and was live on the air from that perch during a 6.7-magnitude earthquake in April 1965. Bonneville moved its Seattle radio and TV stations to the newly constructed "Broadcast House" at Third and Broad Streets in 1968.

In 1973, KIRO ended a 35-year affiliation with CBS and switched to the Mutual Broadcasting System. Around this time, KIRO also picked up Herb Jepko's "Nitecap," a groundbreaking overnight telephone-talk show from Salt Lake City sister station KSL, a 50,000-watt "flamethrower" like KIRO.

"Newsradio 71 KIRO" debuted on July 15, 1974, with news and talk segments replacing most music programming. In September 1974, KIRO switched affiliations again from Mutual, becoming an NBC Radio Network affiliate, but switched back to CBS in November 1976.

=== 1980 to 2008 ===
In 1980, Lloyd Cooney left KIRO to run for the United States Senate. Ken Hatch became president, CEO and chairman, a position he held until 1995. Under Hatch's leadership, KIRO Inc. acquired KING AM, KING-FM, and Third Avenue Productions. KIRO, Inc. became one of the nation's premier regional broadcast groups, and was led by general manager Joe Abel during this period.

KIRO was a full service adult contemporary radio station by the mid 1970s, playing music during the day, talk in the evenings, and more music intensive on weekends with exception of times when sporting events were broadcast. By 1980, the station played music during the day with talk heard night and overnights. The station added talk middays during the week in 1985. By then amounts of music during drive times were down to about 4 songs an hour and during the day, with weekends playing 12 songs an hour. In 1986, KIRO was reclassified as a news and talk station, adding more news programming and dropping music altogether.

In 1993, Bonneville attempted to merge the staff of KIRO radio with that of then-sister station KIRO-TV in an attempt at synergy (the staffs merged in June 1992, with KIRO radio's general manager and news director Andy Ludlum at the helm). Dubbed the "KIRO News Network", this meant that KIRO-TV anchors and reporters would be heard on the radio, while KIRO radio personalities would be seen during KIRO-TV newscasts; during this period, KIRO's radio programming originated from a massive newsroom especially constructed for what was called "News Outside the Box", sharing space with their TV co-workers. Local independent station KTZZ (currently KZJO) simulcast KIRO radio in the mornings with cameras mounted in-studio showing the KIRO staffers on-screen during this time. The effort was a failure and was scrapped completely by September of that year.

For 25 years, KIRO's morning news, anchored by Bill Yeend, consistently placed at or near the top of the Seattle Arbitron ratings. Gregg Hersholt was the station's morning news anchor for the next 10 years until he left the station on May 28, 2010, ending his 26-year career there. Dave Ross now hosts Seattle's Morning News.

=== Sports broadcasts ===
Sports play-by-play has been a staple of the KIRO schedule throughout its history. Since the team's inception in 1976, KIRO has been the flagship radio station for the NFL Seattle Seahawks. About that same time, it was also the flagship station for the Seattle Sounders of the North American Soccer League. From 1985 to 2002, and again since 2009, the station airs Seattle Mariners games. From 1978 to 1987, KIRO was the flagship station of the Seattle SuperSonics. Additionally, KIRO has carried Washington Huskies and Washington State Cougars college football for stints during the '80s and '90s.

KIRO was also the radio home to popular sportscaster Wayne Cody, who did live sideline reports during Seattle Seahawks football games, Washington Huskies college football play-by-play, NASL Seattle Sounders pro soccer play-by-play, and hosted a sports radio talk show weeknights that was the only one of its kind at the time in Seattle. In January 2020, KIRO announced it would serve as the flagship station for the Seattle Dragons of the XFL; the wording of the press release made it ambiguous as to whether or not they would carry live games.

=== Dave Ross ===
Dave Ross joined KIRO as a reporter from Atlanta station WSB in 1978 and took over as noon to 3 p.m. talk host in 1987. He moved to the 9 a.m. to noon time slot after the retirement of Jim French in 1992. Ross unsuccessfully ran for Washington's eighth Congressional district as a Democratic candidate in 2004. While Ross unofficially announced his candidacy in May, he did not leave his on-air position until just prior to the July filing deadline. In response to complaints from state Republican party officials, Ross claimed that he was contractually bound to continue working for KIRO until he formally filed to become a candidate.

Ross returned to the air immediately following the November election. He was moved to the afternoon drive-time shift in February 2005. Ross moved back to his 9am-noon shift in May 2006. Since January 2012, Ross has hosted Seattle's Morning News from 5-9 a.m. In addition to his KIRO work, Ross does a daily commentary on the CBS Radio Network and is also substituted for Charles Osgood on CBS Radio's "Osgood File" segments.

After selling KIRO-TV to the A.H. Belo Corp. in 1995, Bonneville's Seattle radio stations moved to facilities on Eastlake Avenue. KIRO (AM), KIRO-FM (now KKWF) and KNWX (now KTTH) were sold to Entercom Communications of Bala Cynwyd, Pennsylvania, in 1997. Bonneville reacquired KIRO, KTTH, and KBSG (now KIRO-FM) from Entercom in 2007.

=== Talk on FM, sports on AM ===
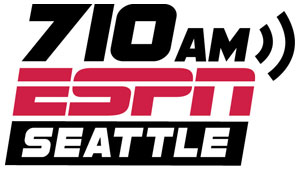
Logo as "710 ESPN Seattle", used from April 1, 2009, to March 7, 2022

On August 12, 2008, KIRO began simulcasting its programming on sister station KBSG-FM, which dropped its long-running classic hits format. This began the transition of KIRO Newsradio from AM to FM. To complete the transition, KIRO AM switched to a sports radio format, as "710 ESPN Seattle," on April 1, 2009. It regained the rights to broadcast Seattle Mariners games, beginning in the 2009 season. KIRO also simulcasts the Seattle Seahawks games with KIRO-FM, and has extensive team-related programming throughout the year. KIRO-FM continues the news/talk format. In addition, 710 ESPN Seattle is the play-by-play home for the Washington State Cougars college football and basketball broadcasts.

Mike Salk was named Program Director of 710 ESPN Seattle on March 13, 2014, returning to the station after a stint in Boston. Before leaving for Boston, Salk had been a co-host on the station.

On March 7, 2022, KIRO rebranded as "Seattle Sports". The rebranding, which coincided with rival KJR moving its programming to FM station KUBE, was not accompanied by any programming changes.
